= Homelessness =

Lacking stable, safe, functional housing

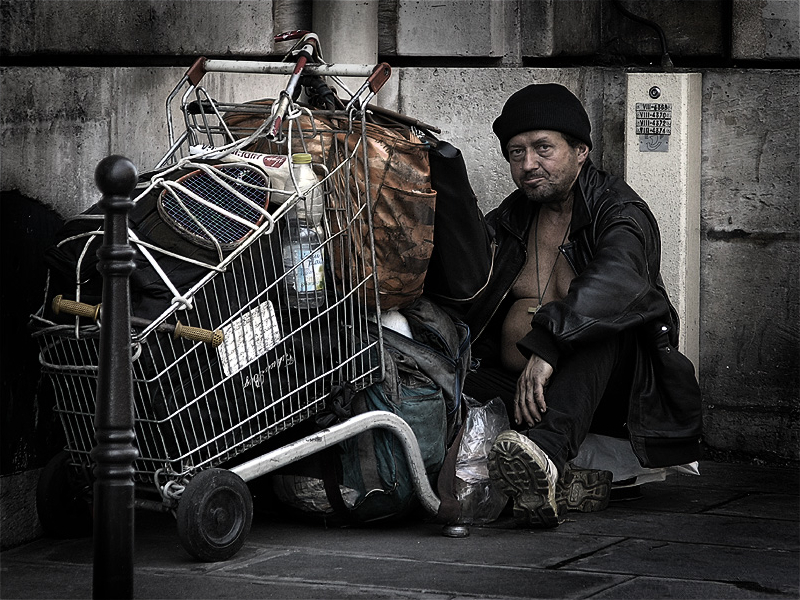
A homeless man in Paris

Homelessness is the condition of lacking stable, safe, and adequate housing. The definition of homelessness differs from country to country, with some countries yet to have any definition in place. People can be categorized as homeless if they:

- are living on the streets (primary homelessness);
- have no permanent house or place to live safely
- are moving between temporary shelters, including houses of friends, family, hotels, and emergency accommodation (secondary homelessness)

The legal status of homeless people changes from place to place. Homeless enumeration studies conducted by the government of the United States also include people who sleep in a public or private place that is not designed for use as a regular sleeping accommodation for human beings. Homelessness and poverty are interrelated. There is no standardized method for counting homeless individuals and identifying their needs; consequently, most cities only have estimated figures for their homeless populations.

In 2025, approximately 330 million people worldwide experienced absolute homelessness, lacking any form of shelter. Other words that have been used to indicate homelessness or homeless persons include vagrancy, hobos, and tramps.

== United Nations definition ==
In 2004, the United Nations Department of Economic and Social Affairs defined a homeless household as those households without a shelter that would fall within the scope of living quarters due to a lack of a steady income. The affected people carry their few possessions with them, sleeping in the streets, in doorways or on piers, or in another space, on a more or less random basis.

In 2009, at the United Nations Economic Commission for Europe Conference of European Statisticians (CES), the Group of Experts on Population and Housing Censuses defined homelessness as:

In its Recommendations for the Censuses of Population and Housing, the CES identifies homeless people under two broad groups:

1. Primary homelessness: this category includes persons living in the streets without a shelter that would fall within the scope of living quarters
2. Secondary homelessness: this category may include persons with no place of usual residence who move frequently between various types of accommodations (including dwellings, shelters, and institutions for the homeless or other living quarters). This category includes persons living in private dwellings but reporting 'no usual address' on their census form.
  The CES acknowledges that the above approach does not provide a full definition of the 'homeless'.

Article 25 of the Universal Declaration of Human Rights, adopted 10 December 1948 by the UN General Assembly, contains this text regarding housing and quality of living:

1. Everyone has the right to a standard of living adequate for the health and well-being of himself and of his family, including food, clothing, housing and medical care and necessary social services, and the right to security in the event of unemployment, sickness, disability, widowhood, old age or other lack of livelihood in circumstances beyond his control. 2. Motherhood and childhood are entitled to special care and assistance. All children, whether born in or out of wedlock, shall enjoy the same social protection.

The ETHOS Typology of Homelessness and Housing Exclusion was developed as a means of improving the understanding and measurement of homelessness in Europe, and to provide a common "language" for transnational exchanges on homelessness. The ETHOS conceptualizes homelessness as a process (rather than a static phenomenon) that affects many vulnerable households at different points in their lives. The typology was launched in 2005 and is used for different purposes: as a framework for debate, for data collection purposes, policy purposes, monitoring purposes, and in the media. This typology is an open exercise that makes abstraction of existing legal definitions in the EU member states. It exists in 25 language versions, the translations being provided mainly by volunteer translators.

Many countries and individuals do not consider housing as a human right. Former U.S. President Jimmy Carter addressed this issue in a 2017 interview, saying, "A lot of people don't look at housing as a human right, but it is". His view contrasts with many Americans who do not believe housing is a basic human right.

== Other terms ==
Many homeless enumeration studies published in the 2010s and onward utilize the term unsheltered homeless. The common colloquial term street people does not fully encompass all unsheltered people, in that many such persons do not spend their time in urban street environments. Many shun such locales, because homeless people in urban environments may face the risk of being robbed or assaulted. Some people convert unoccupied or abandoned buildings ("squatting"), or inhabit mountainous areas or, more often, lowland meadows, creek banks, and beaches.

Many jurisdictions have developed programs to provide short-term emergency shelter during particularly cold spells, often in churches or other institutional properties. These are referred to as warming centers, and are credited by their advocates as lifesaving.

Other common terms include unhoused, urban campers, unsheltered, unhomed, and houseless.

In 2020, an entry on homelessness was added to The Associated Press Stylebook noting how "Homeless is generally acceptable as an adjective to describe people without a fixed residence" and that reporters should use person-first language to "avoid the dehumanizing collective noun the homeless, instead using constructions like homeless people, people without housing or people without homes."

== History ==
=== Early history through the 19th century ===
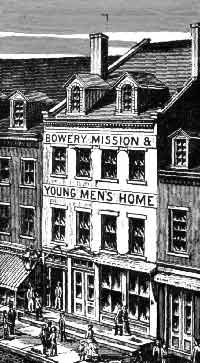
The Bowery Mission in New York City, c. 1800s

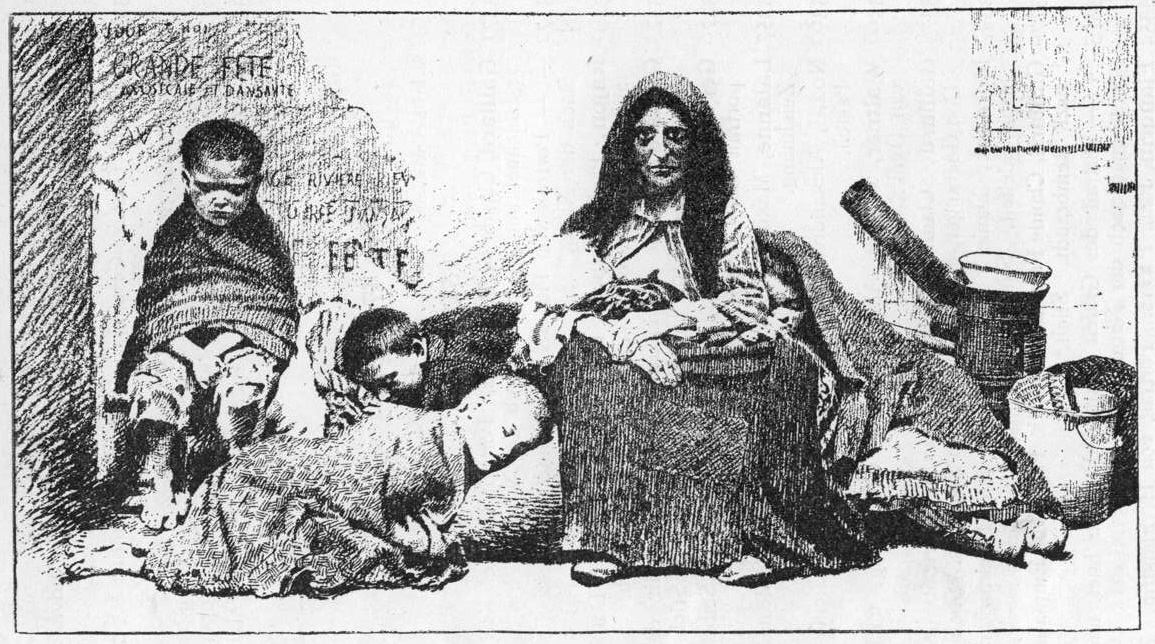
German illustration of a homeless mother and her children in the street, before 1883

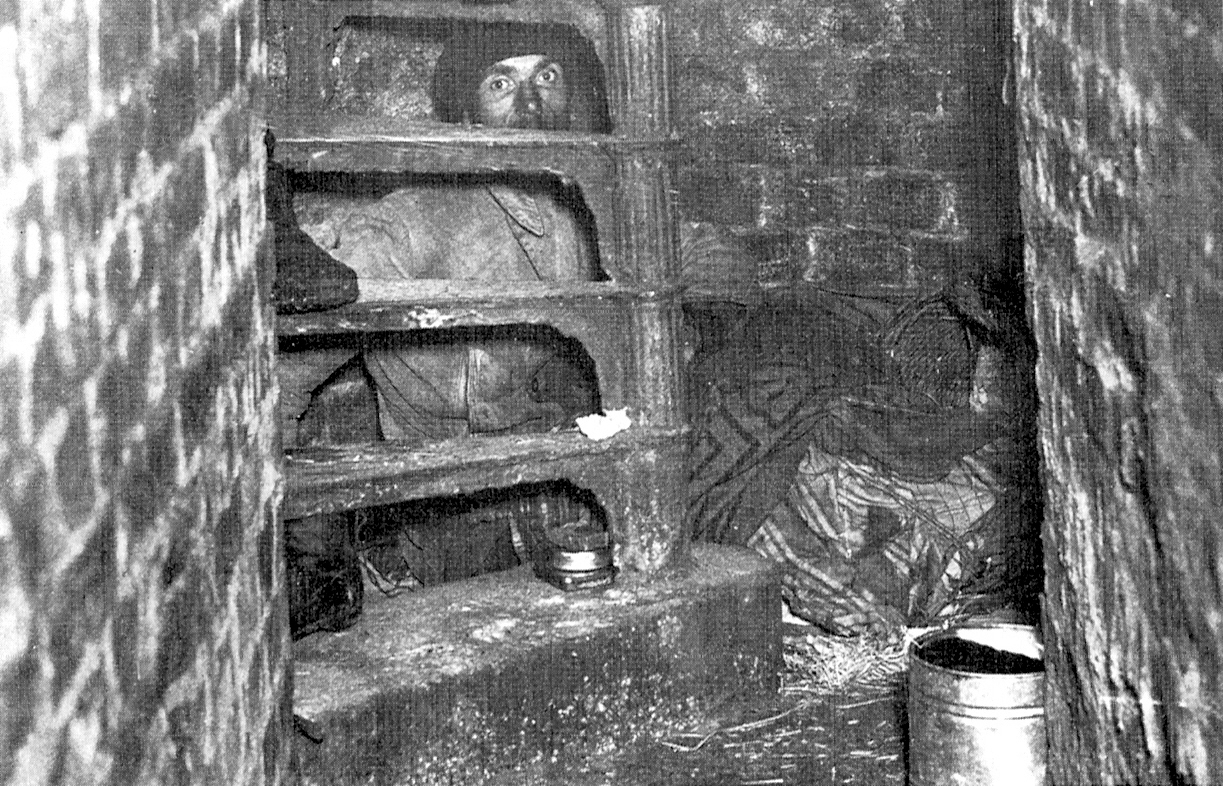
A homeless man living in a sewer, Vienna, Austria, c. 1900

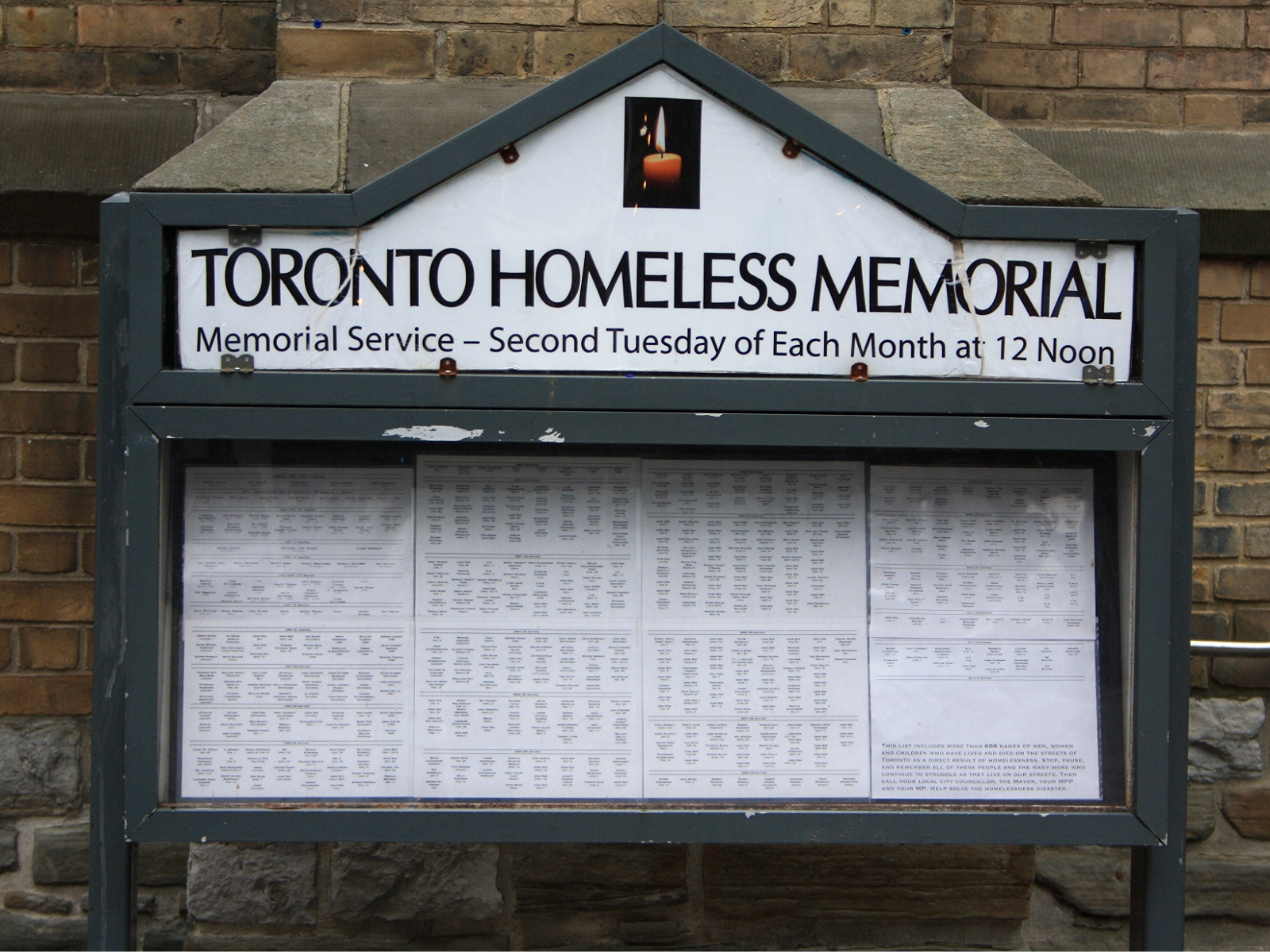
A memorial to homeless people in Toronto, Canada

==== United Kingdom ====
Following the Peasants' Revolt, English constables were authorized under 1383 English Poor Laws to collar vagabonds and force them to show support; if they could not, the penalty was gaol. Vagabonds could be sentenced to the stocks for three days and nights; in 1530, whipping was added. The presumption was that vagabonds were unlicensed beggars. In 1547, a bill was passed that subjected vagrants to more provisions of the criminal law, namely two years servitude and branding with a "V" as the penalty for the first offense and death for the second. Many vagabonds were among the convicts transported to the American colonies in the 18th century.

During the 16th century in England, the state first tried to give housing to vagrants instead of punishing them, by introducing bridewells to take vagrants and train them for a profession. In the 17th and 18th centuries, these were replaced by workhouses but these were intended to discourage too much reliance on state help.

Homeless man in World Trade Center in 1991.

==== United States ====
After 1870 hundreds or thousands of homeless men formed part of a counterculture known as "hobohemia" all over the United States. In smaller towns, hobos temporarily lived near train tracks and hopped onto trains to various destinations.

The first U.S. rescue mission, the New York City Rescue Mission, founded in 1872 by Jerry and Maria McAuley. After 1890 the growing Progressive Era movement toward social concern sparked the development of rescue missions.

=== Modern ===
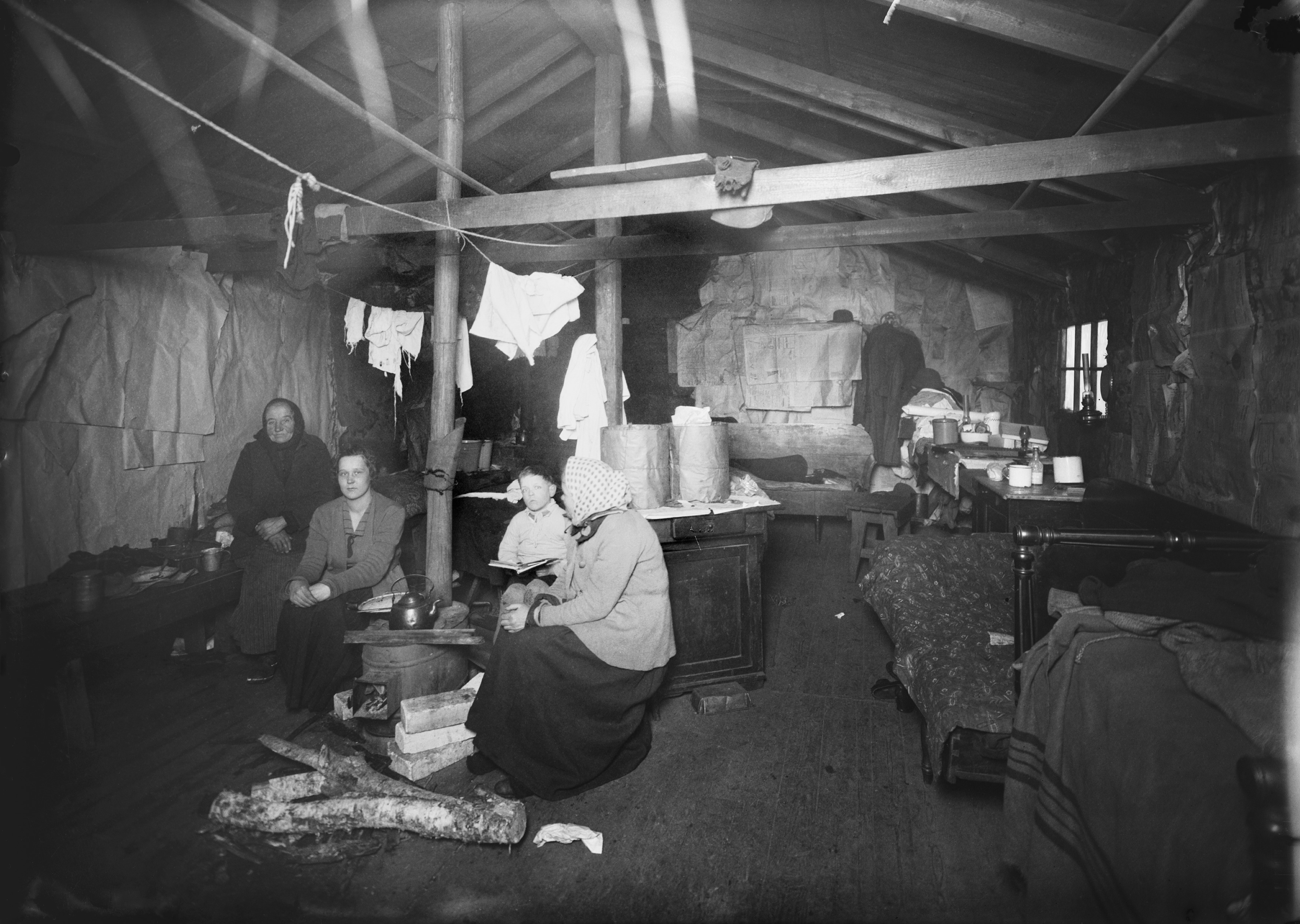
Temporary housing for those evicted from their apartments in Sörnäinen, Helsinki, Finland in 1924

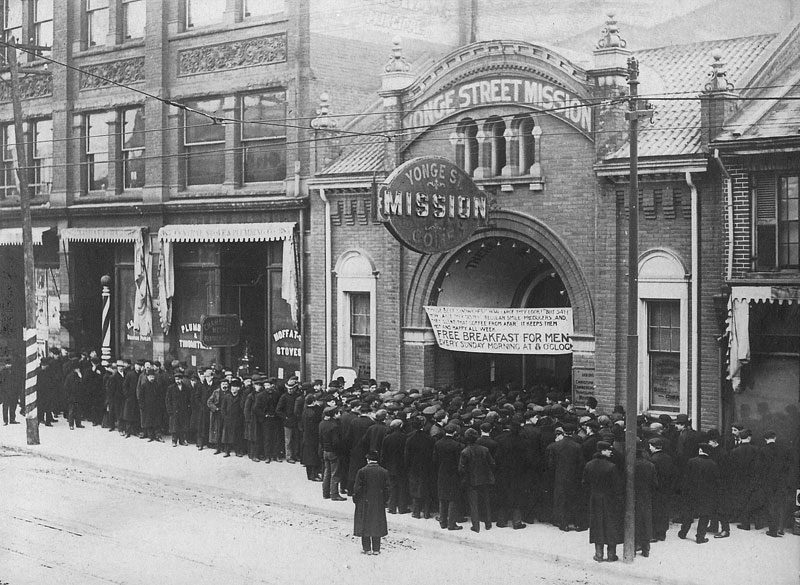
Food line at the Yonge Street Mission, Yonge Street, Toronto, Canada, in the 1930s

==== 20th century ====
The U.S. Great Depression of the 1930s caused an epidemic of poverty, hunger, and homelessness in the United States. When Franklin D. Roosevelt took over the presidency from Herbert Hoover in 1933, he signed the New Deal, which expanded social welfare, including providing funds to build public housing.

How the Other Half Lives and Jack London's The People of the Abyss (1903) discussed homelessness and raised public awareness, which caused some changes in building codes and social conditions. In England, dormitory housing called "spikes" was provided by local boroughs. By the 1930s in England, 30,000 people were living in these facilities. In 1933, George Orwell wrote about poverty in London and Paris, in his book Down and Out in Paris and London. In general, in most countries, many towns and cities had an area that contained the poor, transients, and afflicted, such as a "skid row". In New York City, for example, there was "the Bowery" – traditionally, where people with an alcohol use disorder were to be found sleeping on the streets, bottle in hand.

In the 1960s in the UK, the nature and growing problem of homelessness changed in England as public concern grew. The number of people living "rough" in the streets had increased dramatically. However, beginning with the Conservative administration's Rough Sleeper Initiative in 1990, the number of people sleeping rough in London fell dramatically. This initiative was supported further by the incoming Labour administration from 2009 onwards with the publication of the Coming in from the Cold strategy published by the Rough Sleepers Unit, which proposed and delivered a massive increase in the number of hostel bed spaces in the capital and an increase in funding for street outreach teams, who work with rough sleepers to enable them to access services.

Scotland saw a different picture. The Right to Buy policy in the 1980s and 1990s reduced the amount of social housing available, which contributed to homelessness becoming more prevalent. Scotland ended Right to Buy in 2016, with implementation concluded by mid-2016.

Due to economic crisis and famine in North Korea in the 1990s, many were forced to leave the country in search of employment elsewhere. Many of them became illegal immigrants, seeking asylum in China, South Korea or other nearby countries. Families that made it to China were often separated, in some cases children even fled North Korea on their own. These orphaned North Korean homeless children living in China are called the Kotjebi.

==== 2000s ====
In 2001, the Scottish Parliament came into place. It was agreed by all parties that a ten-year plan to eradicate homelessness by the end of 2012 would be implemented. The Minister for Housing, Iain Gray, met with the third sector and Local Authorities every six weeks, checking on progress, whilst consultations brought about legislative change, alongside work to prevent homelessness. There was a peak in applications around 2005, but from there onwards figures dropped year on year for the next eight years. However, with a focus on the broader numbers of people experiencing homelessness, many people with higher levels of need got caught in the system. Work from 2017 started to address this, with a framework put in place to work towards a day where everyone in Scotland has a home suitable to meet their needs.

In 2002, research showed that children and families were the largest growing segment of the homeless population in the United States, and this has presented new challenges to agencies.

In the U.S., the government asked many major cities to come up with a ten-year plan to end homelessness. One of the results of this was a "Housing First" solution. The Housing First program offers homeless people access to housing without having to undergo tests for sobriety and drug usage. The Housing First program seems to benefit homeless people in every aspect except for substance abuse, for which the program offers little accountability.

An emerging consensus is that the Housing First program still gives clients a higher chance at retaining their housing once they get it. A few critical voices argue that it misuses resources and does more harm than good; they suggest that it encourages rent-seeking and that there is not yet enough evidence-based research on the effects of this program on the homeless population. Some formerly homeless people, who were finally able to obtain housing and other assets which helped to return to a normal lifestyle, have donated money and volunteer services to the organizations that provided aid to them during their homelessness. Alternatively, some social service entities that help homeless people now employ formerly homeless individuals to assist in the care process.

As COVID-era protection programs expired and a cost-of-living crisis hit the U.S., homelessness numbers rose, surpassing 2007 Great Recession levels in 2023.

Homelessness has migrated toward rural and suburban areas. Although the number of homeless people has not changed dramatically, the number of homeless families has increased according to a report by HUD. The United States Congress appropriated $25 million in the McKinney-Vento Homeless Assistance Grants for 2008 to show the effectiveness of Rapid Re-housing programs in reducing family homelessness.

In February 2009, President Barack Obama signed the American Recovery and Reinvestment Act of 2009, part of which addressed homelessness prevention, allocating $1.5 billion for a Homeless Prevention Fund. The Emergency Shelter Grant (ESG) program's name was changed to Emergency Solution Grant (ESG) program, and funds were reallocated to assist with homeless prevention and rapid re-housing for families and individuals.

==== 2020s ====
In January 2024 the United States Supreme Court agreed to make a decision on whether city laws that punish individuals to limit the growth of homeless encampments are in violation of the Constitution's limits for cruel and unusual punishment. In June 2024, the U.S. Supreme Court, in a 6-3 ruling, permitted U.S. cities to criminalize homeless camps, thus making it possible to jail people for sleeping in areas such as public parks. These bans were permitted to be enforced even when no government-provided shelter is made available.

On October 3, 2024, Florida passed the HB 1365 law that prohibits counties from allowing public camping or sleeping on public property without certification of designated public property by DCF according to the Florida Senate.

In the UK, the Ministry of Housing, Communities and Local Government (MHCLG) released a new strategy for England. The National Plan to End Homelessness sets out a long-term vision to end homelessness and rough sleeping, making sure everyone has access to a safe and secure home.

== Causes ==
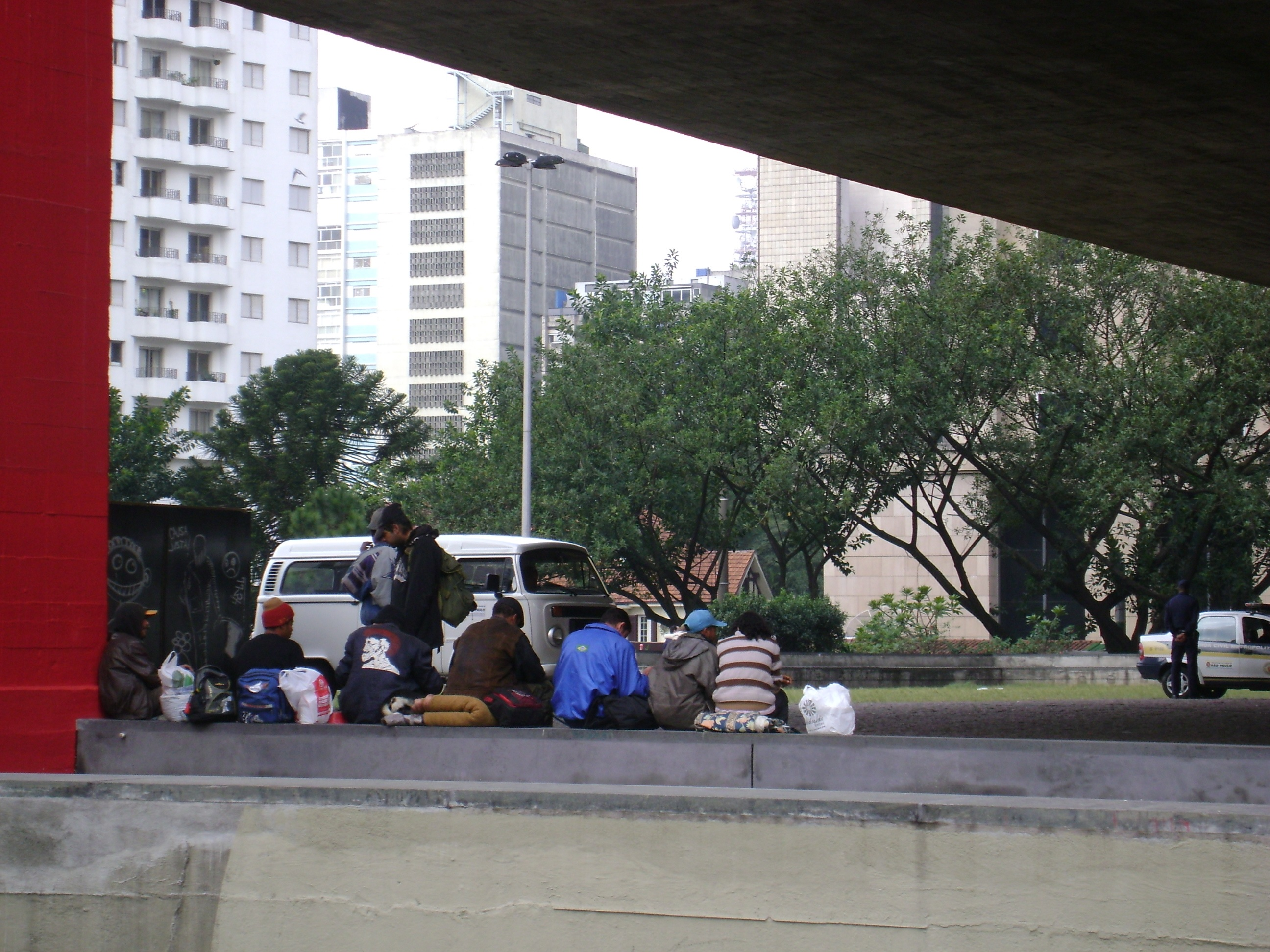
Homeless people in São Paulo, Brazil

Major reasons for homelessness include:

=== Rent and eviction ===
Gentrification is a process in which a formerly inexpensive neighborhood becomes more popular with wealthier people, increasing residential house prices and forcing poorer residents out. Gentrification may cause or influence evictions, foreclosures, and rent regulation.

Increased wealth disparity and income inequality cause distortions in the housing market that push rent burdens higher, making housing unaffordable.

In many countries, people lose their homes by government orders to make way for newer upscale high-rise buildings, roadways, and other governmental needs. The compensation may be minimal, in which case the former occupants cannot find appropriate new housing and become homeless.

Mortgage foreclosures where mortgage holders see the best solution to a loan default is to take and sell the house to pay off the debt can leave people homeless. Foreclosures on landlords often lead to the eviction of their tenants. "The Sarasota, Florida, Herald Tribune noted that, by some estimates, more than 311,000 tenants nationwide have been evicted from homes this year [2009] after lenders took over the properties."

Rent regulation also has a small effect on shelter and street populations. This is largely due to rent control reducing the quality and quantity of housing. For example, a 2019 study found that San Francisco's rent control laws reduced tenant displacement from rent-controlled units in the short-term, but resulted in landlords removing thirty percent of the rent-controlled units from the rental market, (by conversion to condos or TICs) which led to a fifteen percent citywide decrease in total rental units, and a seven percent increase in citywide rents.

=== Economics ===
Lack of jobs that pay living wages, lack of affordable housing, and lack of health and social services can lead to poverty and homelessness. Factors that can lead to economic struggle include neighborhood gentrification (as previously discussed), job loss, debt, loss of money or assets due to divorce, death of breadwinning spouse, being denied jobs due to discrimination, and many others.

Moreover, the absence of accessible healthcare and social services further compounds the economic struggle for many. Inadequate healthcare can lead to untreated illnesses, making it more demanding for certain individuals to maintain employment, perpetuating a continuous cycle of poverty. Social services, including mental health support and addiction treatment, are essential for addressing the root causes of economic hardship. However, limited access to these services leaves vulnerable populations without the necessary support systems, hindering their ability to escape poverty.

=== Physical and mental health ===
Homelessness is closely connected to declines in physical and mental health. Most people who use homeless shelters frequently, face multiple disadvantages, such as the increased prevalence of physical and mental health problems, disabilities, addiction, poverty, and discrimination.

Studies show that preventive and primary care (which homeless people are not receiving) substantially lower overall healthcare costs. In terms of providing adequate treatment to homeless people for their mental illness, the healthcare system's performance has not been promising, either.

Disabilities, especially where disability services are non-existent, inconvenient, or poorly performing can impact a person's ability to support house payments, mortgages, or rent, especially if they are unable to work. Traumatic brain injury is one main disability that can account for homelessness. According to a Canadian survey, traumatic brain injury is widespread among homeless people and, for around 70 percent of respondents, can be attributed to a time "before the onset of homelessness"

Lack of housing serves as a social determinant of mental health. Being afflicted with a mental disorder, including substance use disorders, where mental health services are unavailable or difficult to access can also drive homelessness for the same reasons as disabilities. A United States federal survey in 2005 indicated that at least one-third of homeless men and women had serious psychiatric disorders or problems. Autism spectrum disorders and schizophrenia are the top two common mental disabilities among the U.S. homeless. Personality disorders are also very prevalent, especially Cluster A.

=== Discrimination ===
Men are disproportionately affected by homelessness in the United States, accounting for 70% of all individuals experiencing homelessness in 2018, and as high as 82% in Louisiana and Puerto Rico.

A history of experiencing domestic violence can also attribute to homelessness. Compared to housed women, homeless women were more likely to report childhood histories of abuse, as well as more current physical abuse by male partners.

Gender disparities also influence the demographics of homelessness. The experiences of homeless women and women in poverty are often overlooked, however, they experience specific gender-based victimization. As individuals with little to no physical or material capital, homeless women are particularly targeted by male law enforcement, and men living on the street. It has been found that "street-based homelessness dominates mainstream understanding of homelessness and it is indeed an environment in which males have far greater power (O'Grady and Gaietz, 2004)." Women on the street are often motivated to gain capital through affiliation and relationships with men, rather than facing homelessness alone. Within these relationships, women are still likely to be physically and sexually abused.

Social exclusion related to sexual orientation, gender identity or expression, or sex characteristics can also attribute to homelessness based on discrimination. Relationship breakdown, particularly with young people and their parents, such as disownment due to sexuality or gender identity is one example.

=== Human and natural disasters ===
Natural disasters, including but not limited to earthquakes, hurricanes, tsunamis, tornadoes, and volcanic eruptions can cause homelessness. An example is the 1999 Athens earthquake in Greece, in which many middle-class people became homeless, with some of them living in containers, especially in the Nea Ionia earthquake survivors container city provided by the government; in most cases, their only property that survived the quake was their car. Such people are known in Greece as seismopathis, meaning earthquake-struck.

=== War ===
War and conflict are major drivers of homelessness, displacing millions of people globally. The United Nations High Commissioner for Refugees (UNHCR) estimates that nearly 60 million people are displaced due to war, persecution, and other factors. For example, the Syrian civil war has resulted in over 6.6 million internally displaced persons and 5.6 million refugees. The ongoing Russian invasion of Ukraine has also had a devastating impact, with more than 1.4 million housing units damaged or destroyed, leaving millions in need of housing support. As of early 2024, there are nearly 3.7 million internally displaced people in Ukraine. These individuals often face dire living conditions, with limited access to basic necessities such as shelter, food, and healthcare. The long-term effects of war-induced homelessness include disrupted education, loss of livelihoods, and severe psychological trauma, further complicating efforts to achieve stability and recovery.

=== Foster care ===
Transitions from foster care and other public systems can also impact homelessness; specifically, youth who have been involved in, or are a part of the foster care system, are more likely to become homeless. Most leaving the system have no support and no income, making it nearly impossible to break the cycle, and forcing them to live on the streets. There is also a lack of shelter beds for youth; various shelters have stringent admissions policies.

=== Choice ===
Although exceedingly rare, there do exist some people who decide to be homeless as a personal choice.

=== Childhood predictors ===
In more recent research, scholars have begun to look at the causes of homelessness as a complex accumulation of various triggers throughout an individual's lifetime, rather than simply the experiences of an individual right before they become homeless. Researchers have identified various events that can occur in childhood, which are common experiences among many who experience homelessness. Although not all people who experience these events become homeless, their prevalence among homeless people indicates the nature of the events as potential predictors of homelessness.

One predictor is frequent moving around during childhood, something found to cause emotional stress. Scholars have noted that these experiences at a young age can affect individuals ability to form stable connections in a community. They observed this to be a common trait among homeless people that were surveyed. Another predictor is physical and sexual abuse in childhood, which have been found to stunt development in childhood, relationship building skills, and decision-making skill. All of these factors make individuals much more vulnerable to succumbing to causes of homelessness such as mental health issues.

== Challenges ==
The basic problem of homelessness is the need for personal shelter, warmth, and safety. Other difficulties include:

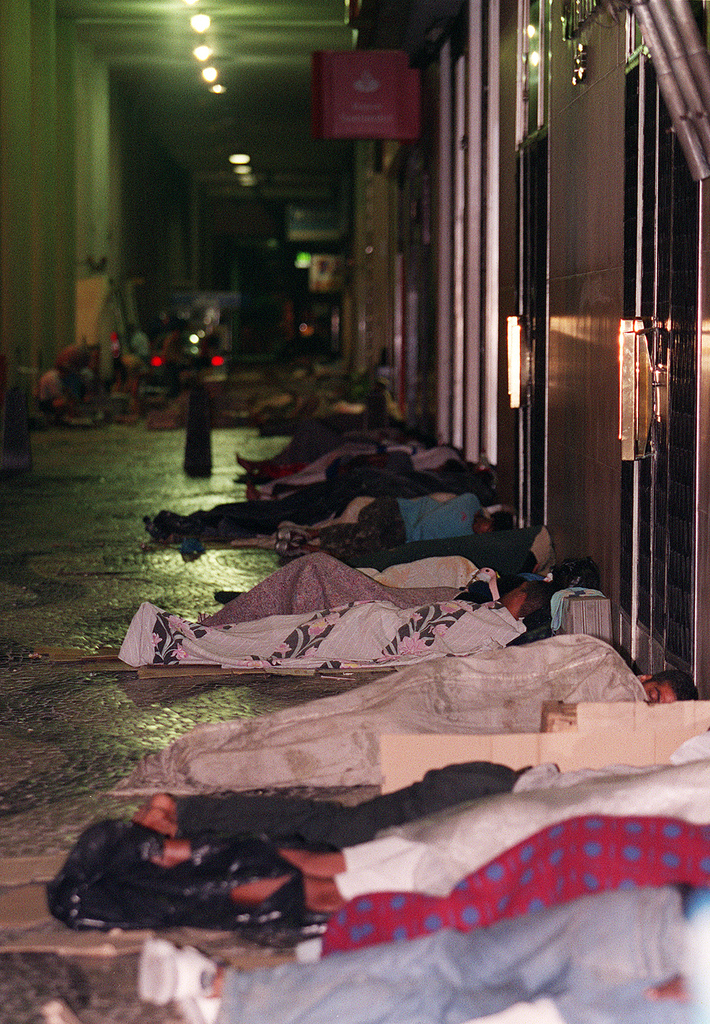
Homeless people in Rio de Janeiro, Brazil

- Hygiene and sanitary facilities
- Hostility from the public and laws against urban vagrancy
- Cleaning and drying of clothes
- Obtaining, preparing, and storing food
- Keeping contact with friends, family, and government service providers without a permanent location or mailing address
- Medical problems, including issues caused by an individual's homeless state (e.g., hypothermia or frostbite from sleeping outside in cold weather), or issues that are exacerbated by homelessness due to lack of access to treatment (e.g., mental health and the individual not having a place to store prescription drugs)
- Personal security, quiet, and privacy, especially for sleeping, bathing, and other hygiene activities
- Safekeeping of bedding, clothing, and possessions, which may have to be carried at all times

People experiencing homelessness face many problems beyond the lack of a safe and suitable home. They are often faced with reduced access to private and public services and vital necessities:

- General rejection or discrimination from other people
- Increased risk of suffering violence and abuse
- Limited access to education
- Loss of usual relationships with the mainstream
- Not being seen as suitable for employment
- Reduced access to banking services
- Reduced access to communications technology
- Reduced access to healthcare and dental services
- Targeting by municipalities to exclude from public space
- Implication of hostile architecture
- Difficulty forming trust with services, systems, and other people; exacerbating pre-existing difficulty accessing aid and escaping homelessness, particularly present in the chronically homeless. Statistics from the past twenty years, in Scotland, demonstrate that the biggest cause of homelessness is varying forms of relationship breakdown.

There is sometimes corruption and theft by the employees of a shelter, as evidenced by a 2011 investigative report by FOX 25 TV in Boston, wherein several Boston public shelter employees were found stealing large amounts of from the shelter's kitchen for their private use and catering over time. Homeless people are often obliged to adopt various strategies of self-presentation to maintain a sense of dignity, which constrains their interaction with passers-by, and leads to suspicion and stigmatization by the mainstream public.

Homelessness is also a risk factor for depression caused by prejudice. When someone is prejudiced against people who are homeless and then becomes homeless themselves, their anti-homelessness prejudice turns inward, causing depression. "Mental disorders, physical disability, homelessness, and having a sexually transmitted infection are all stigmatized statuses someone can gain despite having negative stereotypes about those groups." Difficulties can compound exponentially. A study found that in the city of Hong Kong over half of the homeless people in the city (56%) had some degree of mental illness. Only 13 percent of the 56 percent were receiving treatment for their condition leaving a huge portion of homeless untreated for their mental illness.

The issue of anti-homeless architecture came to light in 2014, after a photo displayed hostile features (spikes on the floor) in London, and took social media by storm. The photo of an anti-homeless structure was a classic example of hostile architecture, in an attempt to discourage people from attempting to access or use public space in irregular ways. However, although this has only recently came to light, hostile architecture has been around for a long time in many places. An example of this is a low overpass that was put in place between New York City and Long Island. Robert Moses, an urban planner, designed it this way in an attempt to prevent public buses from being able to pass through it.

=== Healthcare ===
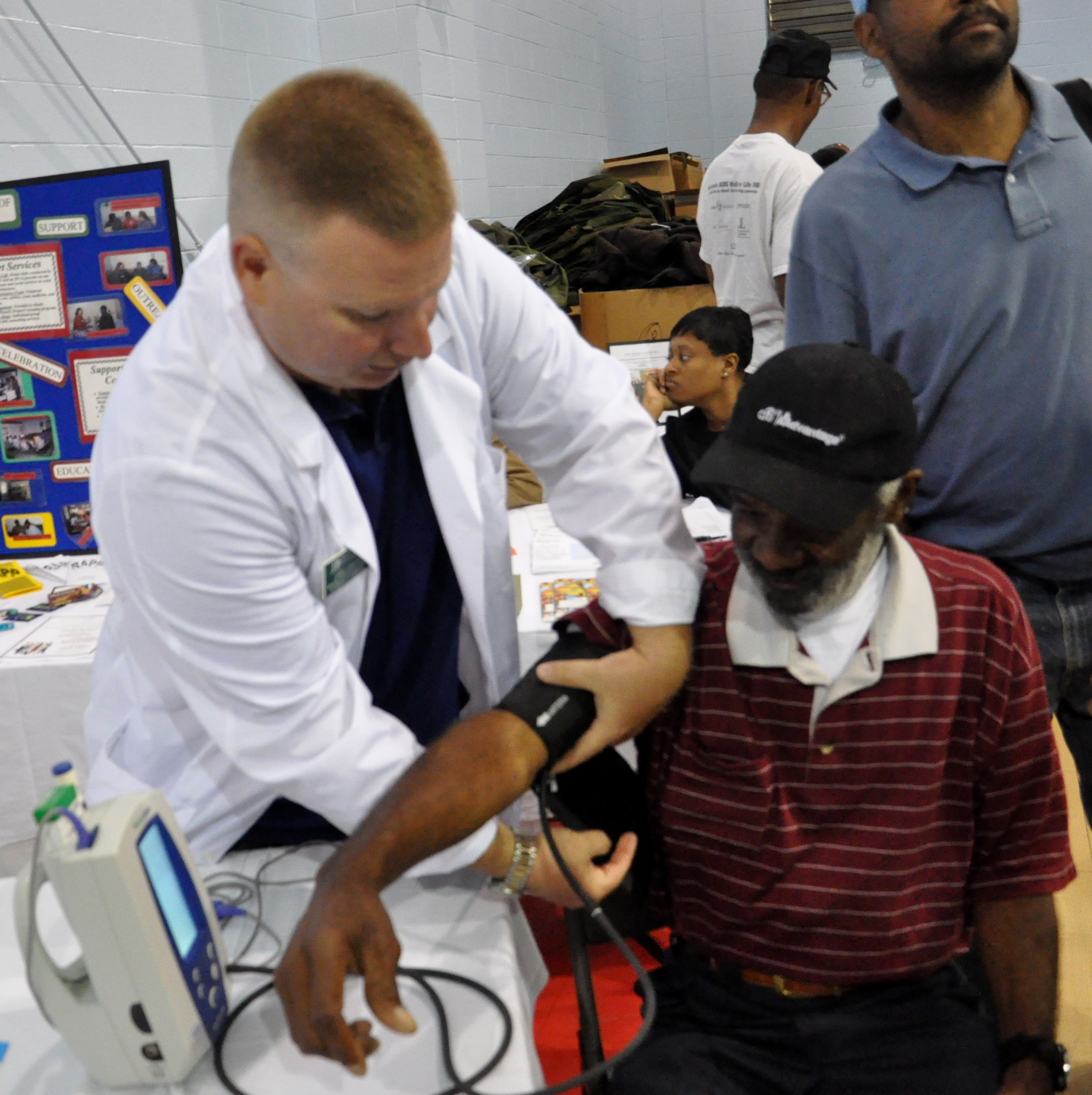
Student nurse at Jacksonville University School of Nursing takes the blood pressure of a homeless veteran during the annual Stand Down for Homelessness activity in Savannah, Georgia.

Health care for homeless people is a major public health challenge. When compared to the general population, people who are homeless experience higher rates of adverse physical and mental health outcomes. Chronic disease severity, respiratory conditions, rates of mental health illnesses, and substance use are all often greater in homeless populations than in the general population. Homelessness is also associated with a high risk of suicide attempts.

Homeless people are more likely to suffer injuries and medical problems from their lifestyle on the street, which includes poor nutrition, exposure to the severe elements of weather, and higher exposure to violence. Yet at the same time, they have reduced access to public medical services or clinics, in part because they often lack identification or registration for public healthcare services. There are significant challenges in treating homeless people who have psychiatric disorders because clinical appointments may not be kept, their continuing whereabouts are unknown, their medicines may not be taken as prescribed, medical and psychiatric histories are not accurate, and other reasons. Because many homeless people have mental illnesses, this has presented a care crisis.

The conditions affecting homeless people are somewhat specialized and have opened a new area of medicine tailored to this population. Skin conditions, including scabies, are common, because homeless people are exposed to extreme cold in the winter, and have little access to bathing facilities. They have problems caring for their feet, and have more severe dental problems than the general population. Diabetes, especially untreated, is widespread in the homeless population. Specialized medical textbooks have been written to address this for providers.

Due to the demand for free medical services by homeless people, it might take months to get a minimal dental appointment in a free-care clinic. Communicable diseases are of great concern, especially tuberculosis, which spreads more easily in crowded homeless shelters in high-density urban settings. There has been ongoing concern and studies about the health and wellness of the older homeless population, typically ages 50 to 64 and older, as to whether they are significantly more sickly than their younger counterparts, and if they are under-served.

A 2011 study led by Dr. Rebecca T. Brown in Boston, conducted by the Institute for Aging Research (an affiliate of Harvard Medical School), Beth Israel Deaconess Medical Center, and the Boston Health Care for the Homeless Program found the elderly homeless population had "higher rates of geriatric syndromes, including functional decline, falls, frailty, and depression than seniors in the general population, and that many of these conditions may be easily treated if detected". The report was published in the Journal of Geriatric Internal Medicine.

There are government avenues which provide resources for the development of healthcare for homeless people. In the United States, the Bureau of Primary Health Care has a program that provides grants to fund the delivery of healthcare to homeless people. According to 2011 UDS, data community health centers were able to provide service to 1,087,431 homeless individuals. Many nonprofit and religious organizations provide healthcare services to homeless people. These organizations help meet the large need which exists for expanding healthcare for homeless people.

There have been significant numbers of unsheltered persons dying of hypothermia, adding impetus to the trend of establishing warming centers, as well as extending enumeration surveys with vulnerability indexes.

==== Effect on life expectancy ====
In 1999, Dr. Susan Barrow of the Columbia University Center for Homelessness Prevention Studies reported in a study that the "age-adjusted death rates of homeless men and women were four times those of the general U.S. population and two to three times those of the general population of New York City". A report commissioned by the homeless charity Crisis in 2011 found that on average, homeless people in the U.K. have a life expectancy of 47 years, 30 years younger than the rest of the population.

==== Health impacts of extreme weather events ====
People experiencing homelessness are at a significantly increased risk of the effects of extreme weather events. Such weather events include extreme heat and cold, floods, storm surges, heavy rain, and droughts. While there are many contributing factors to these events, climate change is driving an increasing frequency and intensity of these events. The homeless population is considerably more vulnerable to these weather events, due to their higher rates of chronic disease, and lower socioeconomic status. Despite having a minimal carbon footprint, homeless people, unfortunately, experience a disproportionate burden of the effects of climate change.

Homeless persons have increased vulnerability to extreme weather events for many reasons. They are disadvantaged in most social determinants of health, including lack of housing and access to adequate food and water, reduced access to health care, and difficulty in maintaining health care. They have significantly higher rates of chronic disease including respiratory disease and infections, gastrointestinal disease, musculoskeletal problems, and mental health disease. In fact, self-reported rates of respiratory diseases (including asthma, chronic bronchitis, and emphysema) are double that of the general population.

The homeless population often lives in higher-risk urban areas, with increased exposure and little protection from the elements. They also have limited access to clean drinking water and other methods of cooling down. The built environment in urban areas also contributes to the "heat island effect", the phenomenon whereby cities experience higher temperatures due to the predominance of dark, paved surfaces, and lack of vegetation. Homeless populations are often excluded from disaster planning efforts, further increasing their vulnerability when these events occur. Without the means to escape extreme temperatures and seek proper shelter, and cooling or warming resources, homeless people are often left to suffer the brunt of the extreme weather.

The health effects that result from extreme weather include exacerbation of chronic diseases and acute illnesses. Pre-existing conditions can be greatly exacerbated by extreme heat and cold, including cardiovascular, respiratory, skin, and renal disease, often resulting in higher morbidity and mortality during extreme weather. Acute conditions such as sunburn, dehydration, heat stroke, and allergic reactions are also common. In addition, a rise in insect bites can lead to vector-borne infections.

Mental health conditions can also be impacted by extreme weather events as a result of lack of sleep, increased alcohol consumption, reduced access to resources, and reduced ability to adjust to environmental changes. Pre-existing psychiatric illness has been shown to triple the risk of death from extreme heat. Overall, extreme weather events appear to have a "magnifying effect" in exacerbating the underlying prevalent mental and physical health conditions of homeless populations.

===== Case study: Hurricane Katrina =====
In 2005, Hurricane Katrina, a category-5 hurricane, made landfall in Florida and Louisiana. It particularly affected the city of New Orleans and the surrounding areas. Hurricane Katrina was the deadliest hurricane in the US in seven decades, with more than 1,600 confirmed deaths, and more than 1,000 people missing. The hurricane disproportionately affected marginalized individuals, and individuals with lower socioeconomic status (i.e., 93% of shelter residents were African–American, 32 percent had household incomes below $10,000/year and 54 percent were uninsured).

The storm nearly doubled the number of homeless people in New Orleans. While in most cities, homeless people account for one percent of the population, in New Orleans', the homeless account for four percent of the population. In addition to its devastating effects on infrastructure and the economy, the estimated prevalence of mental illness and the incidence of West Nile virus more than doubled after Hurricane Katrina in the hurricane-affected regions.

=== Legal documentation ===
Homeless people may find it difficult to document their date of birth or their address. Because homeless people usually have no place to store possessions, they often lose their belongings, including identification and other documents, or find them destroyed by police or others. Without a photo ID, homeless persons cannot get a job or access many social services, including healthcare. They can be denied access to even the most basic assistance: clothing closets, food pantries, certain public benefits, and in some cases, emergency shelters. Obtaining replacement identification is difficult. Without an address, birth certificates cannot be mailed. Fees may be cost-prohibitive for impoverished persons. And some states will not issue birth certificates unless the person has photo identification, creating a catch-22. This problem is far less acute in countries that provide free-at-use healthcare, such as the U.K., where hospitals are open-access day and night and make no charges for treatment. In the U.S., free-care clinics for homeless people and other people do exist in major cities, but often attract more demand than they can meet.

=== Victimization by violent crimes ===
Homeless people are often the victims of violent crime. A 2007 study found that the rate of violent crimes against homeless people in the United States is increasing. A study of women veterans found that homelessness is associated with domestic violence, both directly, as the result of leaving an abusive partner, and indirectly, due to trauma, mental health conditions, and substance abuse.

A 2024 study published in the Annual Review of Criminology confirmed findings in United States and Canada over a 30-year cohort study that homelessness faces the additional challenge of separating its consequences from the factors that lead to it. Homelessness is related to many variables associated with crime, victimization, and criminal legal system contact.

Conditions such as alcoholism and mental illness are often associated with homelessness. Many people fear homeless people, due to the stigma surrounding the homeless community. Surveys have revealed that before spending time with homeless people, most people fear them, but after spending time with homeless people, that fear is lessened or is no longer there. Another effect of this stigma is isolation.

The stigmas of homelessness can thus be divided into three major categories in general:

1. Attributing homelessness to personal incompetency and health conditions (e.g., unemployment, mental health issues, substance abuse, etc.);
2. Seeing homeless people as posing threats to one's safety;
3. De-sanitizing homeless people (i.e., seeing them as pathogens). Past research has shown that those types of stigmas are being reinforced through the fact that one is homeless and have a negative impact on effective public policymaking in terms of reducing homelessness. When a person lives on a street, many aspects of their personal situations, such as mental health issues and alcoholism, are more likely to be exposed to the public as compared to people who are not homeless and have access to resources that will help improve their personal crises. Such lack of privacy inevitably reinforces stigma by increasing observations of stereotypes for the public. Furthermore, the media often attributes those personal crises to the direct cause of crimes, further leading the public to believe that homeless people are a threat to their safety. Many also believe that contacts with homeless people increase their chance of contracting diseases given that they lack access to stable, sanitary living conditions. Those types of stigmas are intertwined with each other when shaping public opinions on policies related to the homeless population, resulting in many ineffective policies that do not reduce homelessness at all. An example of such ineffective but somewhat popular policies is imposing bans on sleeping on the streets.

Relying on the famous contact hypothesis, researchers argue that increasing contact between the homeless population and non-homeless population is likely to change public opinions on this out-group and make the public more well-informed when it comes to policymaking. While some believe that the contact hypothesis is only valid on the condition that the context and type of contact are specified, in the case of reducing discrimination against the homelessness population, some survey data indicate that the context (e.g., the proportion of the homeless population in one's city) and type of contact (e.g., TV shows about the homeless population or interpersonal conversations about homelessness) do not produce many variations as they all increase positive attitudes towards homeless people and public policies that aid this group. Given that the restrictions of contexts and types of contact to reduce stigma are minimal, this finding is informative and significant to the government when it comes to making policies to offer institutional support for reducing discrimination in a country and for gauging public opinions on their proposed policies to reduce homelessness.

== Homelessness by continent ==
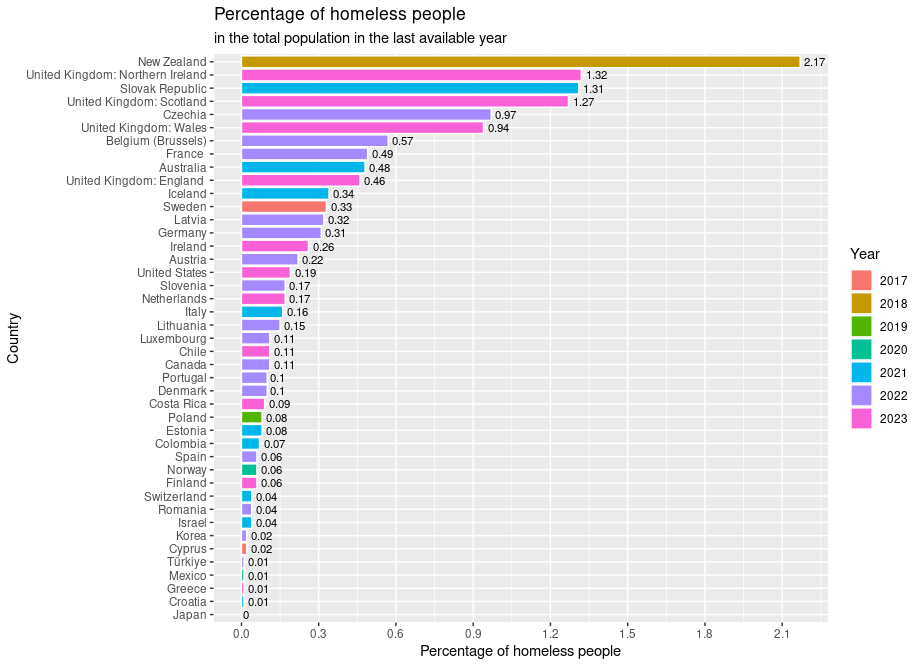
Data:OECD

=== Africa ===
==== Egypt ====
Homelessness in Egypt is a significant social issue affecting some 12 million people in the country. Egypt has over 1,200 areas designated for irregular dwellings that do not conform to standard building laws, allowing homeless people to build shacks and other shelters for themselves.

Reportedly, in Egypt, homelessness is defined to include those living in marginal housing. Some scholars have stated that there is no agreed-upon definition of homelessness in Egypt due to the difficulties government would face if an official definition were accepted.

According to UNICEF, there are one million children living on the streets in Egypt. Other researchers estimate the number to be some three million. Homelessness NGOs assisting street children include those such as Hope Village Society, and NAFAS. Other NGOs, such as Plan International Egypt, work to reintegrate street children back into their families.

==== South Africa ====
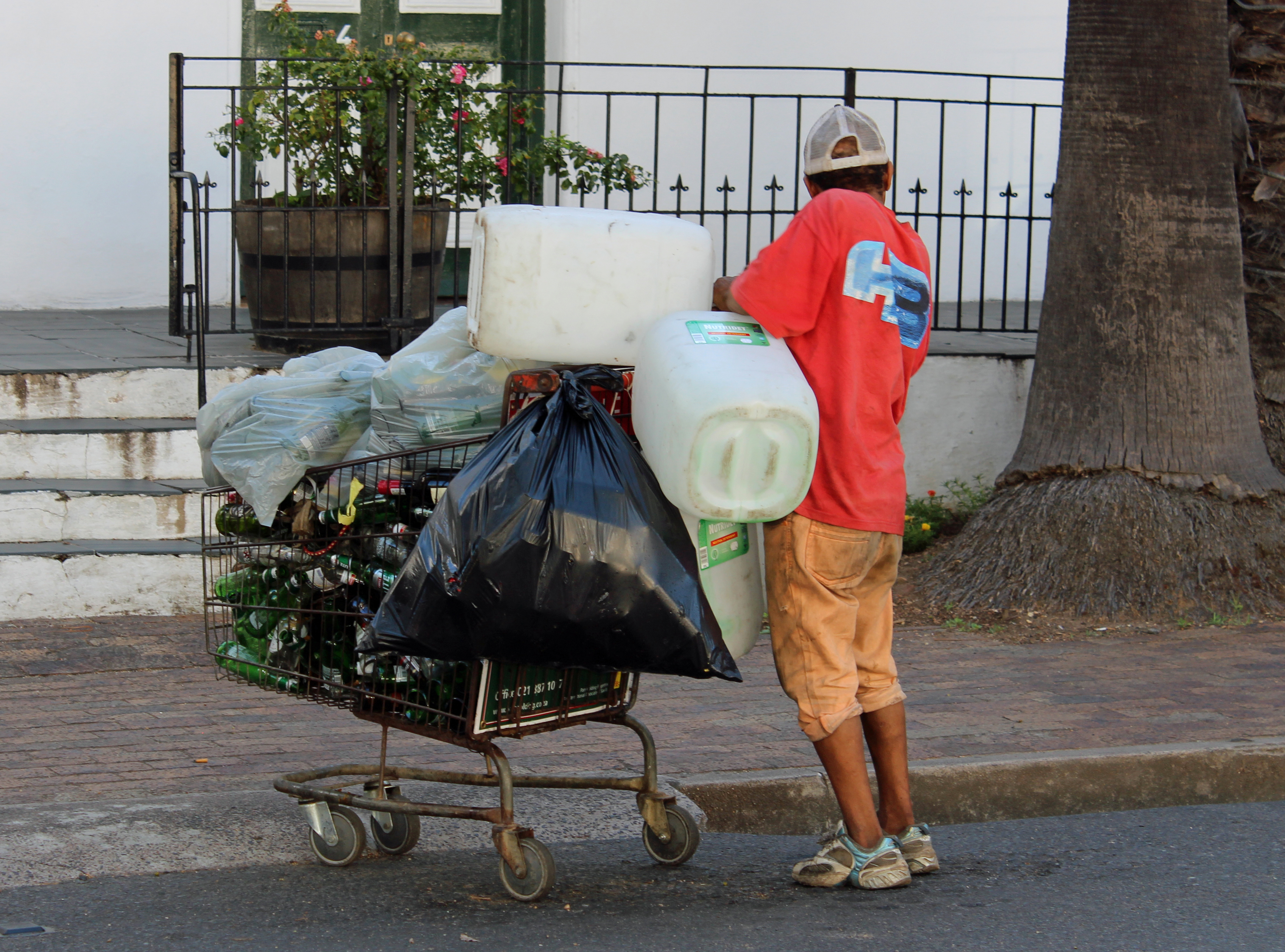
A homeless person collecting recyclable materials in Stellenbosch, South Africa

Homelessness in South Africa dates back to the apartheid period. Increasing unemployment, lack of affordable housing, social disintegration, and social and economic policies have all been identified as contributing factors to the issue. Some scholars argue that solutions to homelessness in South Africa lie more within the private sphere than in the legal and political spheres.

There is no national census on homeless people in South Africa, researchers instead rely on individual studies of homeless persons in particular cities. The South African homeless population has been estimated at 200,000 people from a diverse range of backgrounds. One study found that three out of four South African metropolitan municipalities viewed homelessness primarily as a social dependency issue, responding with social interventions. At the same time, homeless South Africans indicated that the most important thing the municipality could assist them with was employment and well-located affordable housing.

=== Asia ===
==== China ====
In 2011, there were approximately 2.41 million homeless adults and 179,000 homeless children living in the country. However, one publication estimated that there were one million homeless children in China in 2012.

Housing in China is highly regulated by the Hukou system. This gives rise to a large number of migrant workers, numbering 290.77 million in 2019. These migrant workers have rural Hukou, but they move to the cities in order to find better jobs, though due to their rural Hukou they are entitled to fewer privileges than those with urban Hukou. According to Huili et al., these migrant workers "live in overcrowded and unsanitary conditions" and are always at risk of displacement to make way for new real estate developments. In 2017, the government responded to a deadly fire in a crowded building in Beijing by cracking down on dense illegal shared accommodations and evicting the residents, leaving many migrant laborers homeless. This comes in the context of larger attempts by the government to limit the population increase in Beijing, often targeting migrant laborers. However, according to official government statistics, migrant workers in China have an average of 20.4 square metres (220 square feet) of living space per capita, and the vast majority of migrant workers have basic living facilities such as heating, bathing, refrigerators, and washing machines.

Several natural disasters have led to homelessness in China. The 2000 Yunnan earthquake left 92,479 homeless and destroyed over 41,000 homes.

Homelessness among people with mental health problems is 'much less common' in China than in high-income countries, due to stronger family ties, but is increasing due to migration within families and as a result of the one-child policy. A study in Xiangtan found at least 2439 schizophrenic people that have been homeless on a total population of 2.8 million. It was found that "homelessness was more common in individuals from rural communities (where social support services are limited), among those who wander away from their communities (i.e., those not from Xiangtan municipality), and among those with limited education (who are less able to mobilize social supports). Homelessness was also associated with greater age; [the cause] may be that older patients have 'burned their bridges' with relatives and, thus, end up on the streets."

During the Cultural Revolution a large part of child welfare homes were closed down, leaving their inhabitants homeless. By the late 1990s, many new homes were set up to accommodate abandoned children. In 1999, the Ministry of Civil Affairs estimated the number of abandoned children in welfare homes to be 66,000.

According to the Ministry of Civil Affairs, China had approximately 2,000 shelters and 20,000 social workers to aid approximately three million homeless people in 2014.

From 2017 to 2019, the government of Guangdong Province assisted 5,388 homeless people in reuniting with relatives elsewhere in China. The Guangdong government assisted more than 150,000 people over three years.

In 2020, in the wake of the COVID-19 pandemic, the Chinese Ministry of Civil Affairs announced several actions of the Central Committee in response to homelessness, including increasing support services and reuniting homeless people with their families. In Wuhan, the situation for homeless people was particularly bad, as the lockdown made it impossible for homeless migrants to return to other parts of the country. The Wuhan Civil Affairs Bureau set up 69 shelters in the city to house 4,843 people.

==== India ====
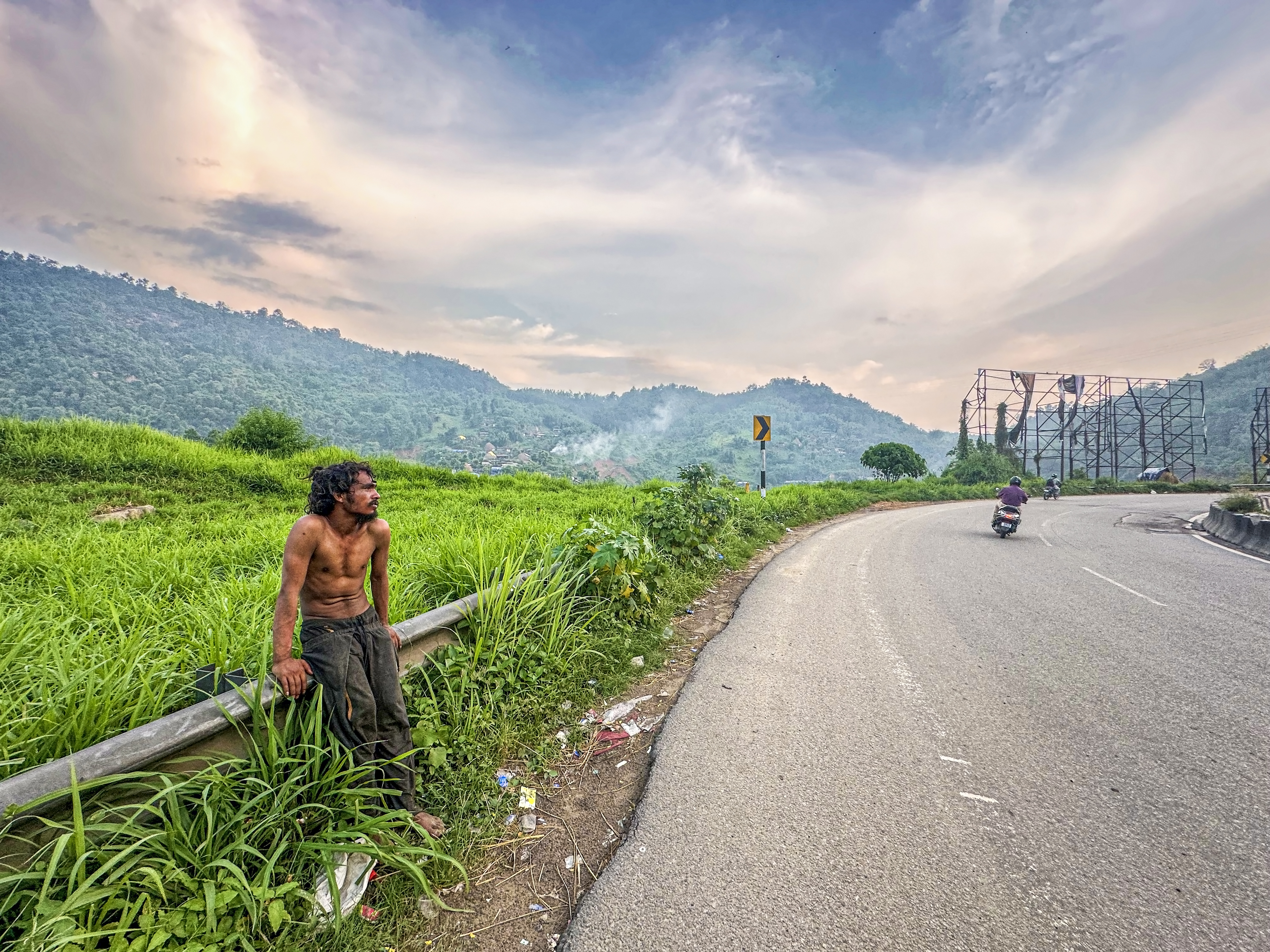
Homeless person on the roadside of National Highway 27 in India

The Universal Declaration of Human Rights defines 'homeless' as those who do not live in a regular residence due to lack of adequate housing, safety, and availability. The United Nations Economic and Social Council Statement has a broader definition for homelessness; it defines homelessness as follows: 'When we are talking about housing, we are not just talking about four walls and a roof. The right to adequate housing is about the security of tenure, affordability, access to services, and cultural adequacy. It is about protection from forced eviction and displacement, fighting homelessness, poverty, and exclusion. India defines 'homeless' as people who do not live in census houses, but rather stay on pavements, roadsides, railway platforms, staircases, temples, streets, in pipes, or other open spaces. There are 1.77 million homeless people in India, or 0.15 percent of the country's total population, according to the 2011 census consisting of single men, women, mothers, the elderly, and the disabled. However, it is argued that the numbers are far greater than accounted by the point in time method. For example, while the Census of 2011 counted 46.724 homeless individuals in Delhi, the Indo-Global Social Service Society counted them to be 88,410, and another organization called the Delhi Development Authority counted them to be 150,000. Furthermore, there is a high proportion of mentally ill and street children in the homeless population. There are 18 million street children in India, the largest number of any country in the world, with 11 million being urban. Finally, more than three million men and women are homeless in India's capital city of New Delhi; the same population in Canada would make up approximately 30 electoral districts. A family of four members has an average of five homeless generations in India.

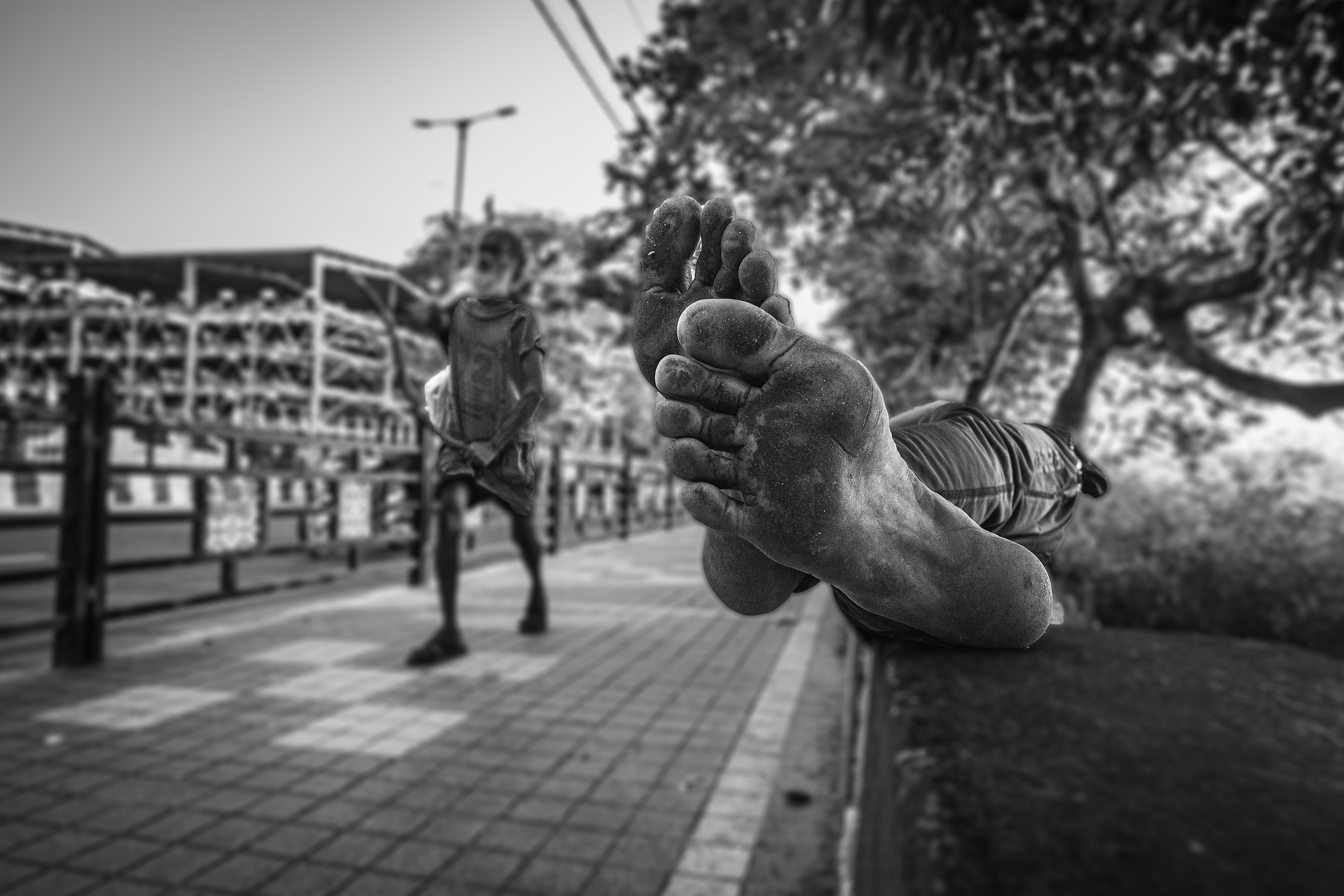
A homeless person resting on the roadside pavement in India.

There is a shortage of 18.78 million houses in the country. The total number of houses has increased from 52.06 million to 78.48 million (as per the 2011 census). However, the country still ranks as the 124th wealthiest country in the world as of 2003. More than 90 million people in India make less than US$1 per day, thus setting them below the global poverty threshold. The ability of the Government of India to tackle urban homelessness and poverty may be affected in the future by both external and internal factors. The number of people living in slums in India has more than doubled in the past two decades and now exceeds the entire population of Britain, the Indian Government has announced. About 78 million people in India live in slums and tenements. Seventeen percent of the world's slum dwellers reside in India. After the release of the feature film Slumdog Millionaire in 2008, Mumbai was a slum tourist destination for slumming where homeless people and slum dwellers alike could be openly viewed by tourists.

==== Indonesia ====
Homelessness in Indonesia refers to the issue of homelessness, a condition wherein people lack a stable and appropriate place of housing. The number of homeless people in Indonesia is estimated to be up to three million people in the country, with over 28,000 in Jakarta alone. Several terms are used to describe homeless people in Indonesia, including tunawisma, which is used by the government, and gelandangan, meaning "tramp".

Squatters and street homeless people are often targeted by police raids who say that homeless people "disturb the attractiveness of the city".

One cause of homelessness in Indonesia is forced evictions. According to researchers, between the years 2000 and 2005 over 92,000 people were forcefully evicted from their homes.

==== Iran ====
According to Governor of Isfahan homeless people are an issue, per revised Article 16 of drug combat law the offenders will be forced detained for three to six months by either IRGC or privately outsourced. Women are kept separate. Iran has a housing crisis with people who sleep in graves called Grave dwellers, buses for 25000 toman per night, rooftops or multiple families renting and sharing one single apartment. Many renters may want to rent living space in shipping containers too.

==== Israel ====
Homelessness in Israel is a phenomenon that mostly developed after the mid-1980s.

Homelessness increased following the wave of Soviet immigration in 1991. As many as 70 percent of homeless people in Tel Aviv are immigrants from the former Soviet Union, nearly all of them men. According to homeless shelter founder Gilad Harish, "when the recession hit Israel in the early 1990s, the principle of 'last in, first out' kicked in, and many Russian immigrants lost their jobs. Being new to the country, they didn't have a strong family support system to fall back on like other Israelis do. Some ended up on the street with nowhere to go."

The number of homeless people in Israel grew in the 2000s, and the Association for Civil Rights in Israel claimed that the authorities were ignoring the issue.

Some 2,000 families in Israel lose their homes every year after defaulting on their mortgage loans. However, a law amendment passed in 2009 protects the rights of mortgage debtors and ensures that they are not evicted after failing to meet mortgage payments. The amendment is part of a wider reform in the law in the wake of a lengthy battle by the Association for Civil Rights in Israel and other human rights groups.

In 2007, the number of homeless youth was on the rise. More than 25 percent of all homeless youth in 2007 were girls, compared to 15 percent in 2004. A report by Elem, a non-profit organization that helps youth at risk, pointed to a five percent rise in the number of youths either homeless or wandering the streets late at night while their parents worked or due to strained relations at home. The organization estimated that in 2007 it provided programs or temporary shelter to roughly 32,000 youths in some 30 locations countrywide.

In 2014, the number of homeless individuals in Israel was estimated at 1,831, about 600 of whom were living on the streets of Tel Aviv. This makes up 0.02 percent of the country's population, a low figure compared to other developed nations. In July 2015, the Welfare Ministry estimated the number of homeless people to be between 800 and 900, including 450 receiving services and treatment from their municipalities but continuing to live on the streets. Elem claimed the true figure was much higher. In December 2015, a large study by the Welfare Ministry found that 2,300 people in Israel were homeless.

Homeless people in Israel are entitled to a monthly government stipend of NIS 1,000. In addition, there are both state-run homeless shelters operated by the Welfare Ministry and privately run shelters.

Adi Nes, an Israeli photographer, has brought public attention to the issue by taking pictures of Israel's homeless.

==== Japan ====
Homelessness in Japan (ホームレス, 浮浪者)) is a social issue primarily affecting middle-aged and elderly males. Homelessness is thought to have peaked in the 1990s as a consequence of the collapse of the Japanese asset price bubble and has largely fallen since then.

According to the "Special Act in regards to Supporting the Autonomy of the Homeless Population" (Japanese: ホームレスの自立の支援等に関する特別措置法)), the term "homeless" is defined as "those [people] who utilize city parks, river banks, roads, train stations, and other facilities as their place of stay to live their daily lives".

Nicknames for homeless people in Japan include hōmuresu (ホームレス, from the English "homeless"), furousha (浮浪者, meaning "wandering person"), kojiki (乞食, meaning beggar), and runpen (ルンペン, from German "Lumpen"). More recently, nojukusha (野宿者, "person who sleeps outside") and nojuku roudousha (野宿労働者, "laborer who sleeps outside") have been used to avoid negative connotations associated with the word "homeless".

==== Philippines ====
There are approximately 4.5 million homeless people in the Philippines, about three million of those are in Manila.

=== Europe ===
At least 895,000 people are estimated to be homeless on any one night, according to the European Federation of National Organisations working with the Homeless (FEANTSA) in research published in September 2023. This was based on the most recent national statistics in 23 European countries, recording 533,054 people as homeless, and applying the average percentage of homeless people in those countries (0.174%) to Europe's total estimated population in 2022 (513 million).

==== Ireland ====
In the Republic of Ireland, the legislative framework addressing homelessness is primarily established by the Housing Act 1988 (Ireland). Under this act, local authorities are mandated to assess individuals who may be homeless and to provide appropriate assistance, which can include offering accommodation or financial support. There is no explicit legal entitlement to housing in Ireland. Local authorities are responsible for offering housing to adults unable to afford it, and Tusla, the Child and Family Agency, is tasked with providing accommodation for homeless children or those requiring care.

As of Census 2022, 10,321 individuals were recorded as homeless in Ireland, with over two-thirds (7,238) located in the Dublin region. This represents a significant increase compared to previous years. In March 2021, for instance, 5,894 adults were utilizing homeless services, including 913 families with 2,166 dependents.

The Irish government has taken steps to address homelessness through initiatives such as Housing for All, a national plan aimed at increasing the supply of social and affordable housing. The plan includes commitments to reducing reliance on emergency accommodation and increasing long-term housing solutions. However, despite these efforts, homelessness continues to rise, with advocacy groups calling for additional measures such as rent controls and eviction bans to prevent further displacement.

==== Switzerland ====
Homelessness in Switzerland is a known social issue, however, there are few estimates as to the number of Swiss people affected. Homelessness is less visible in Switzerland than in many other Western countries. The majority of homeless people in Geneva are Swiss or French, with a minority from other countries.

One Swiss study found that 1.6 percent of all patients admitted to psychiatric wards were homeless. The study reported that social factors and psychopathology are independently contributing to the risk of homelessness.

In 2014, Swiss authorities reportedly began allowing homeless people to sleep in fallout shelters built during the Cold War.

There are many centers for providing food for homeless people, including the Suneboge community center.

==== United Kingdom ====
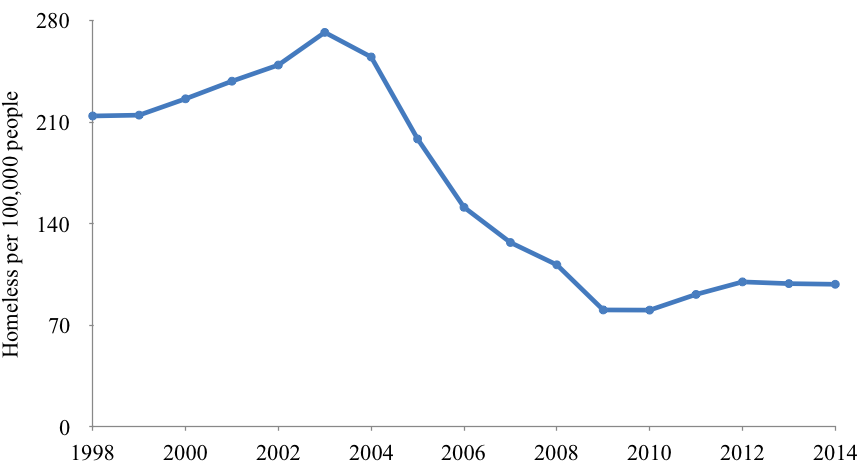
Number of homeless in England per 100,000 people, 1998–2014

Homelessness across the UK is a devolved matter, resulting in different legislation, frameworks, and even definitions, from country to country. Since the late 1990s, housing policy has been a devolved matter, and state support for homeless people, together with legal rights in housing, have therefore diverged to a certain degree.

===== England =====
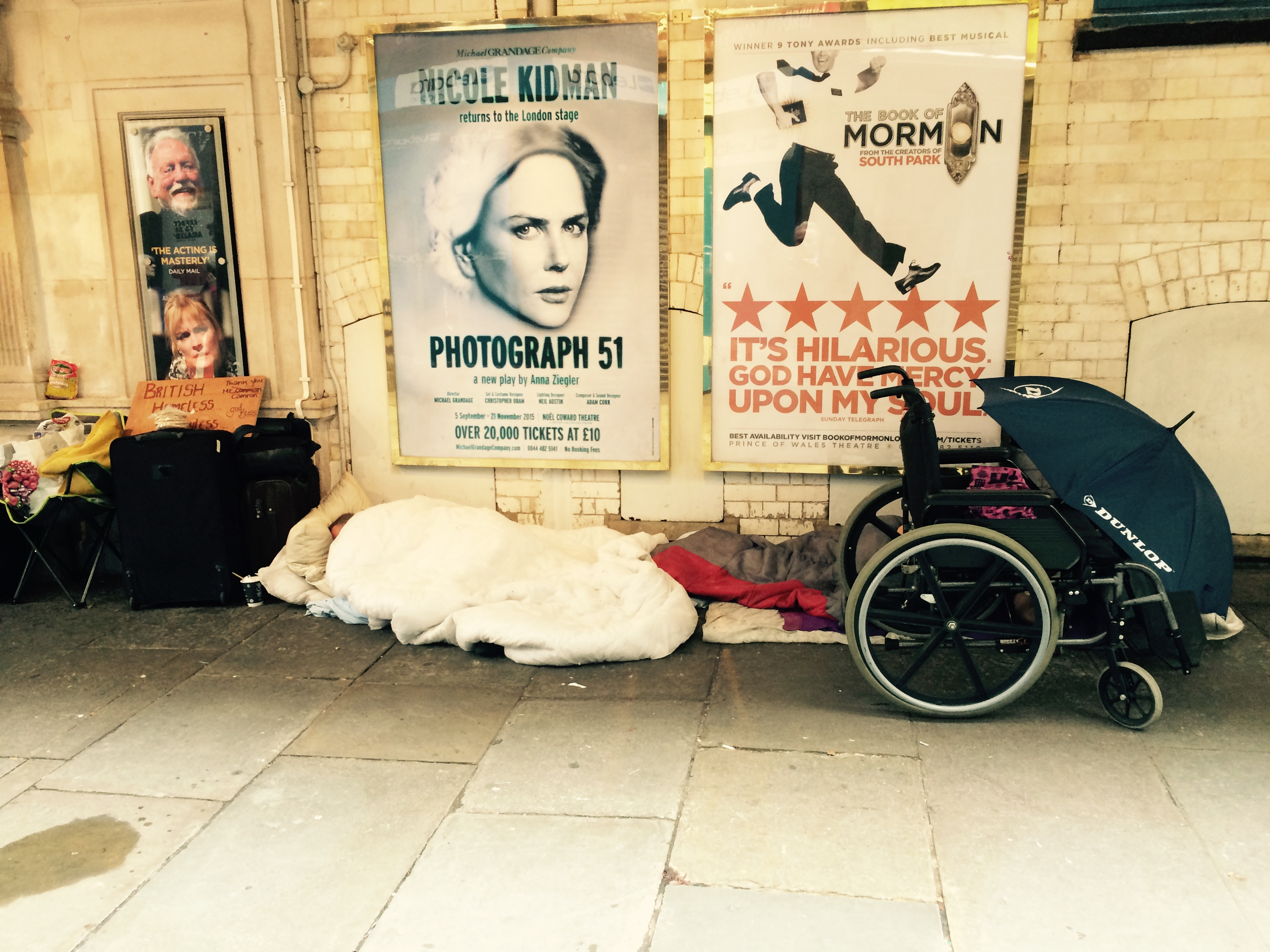
Homeless persons sleeping in London, 2015

A national service, called Streetlink, was established in 2012 to help members of the public obtain near-immediate assistance for specific rough sleepers, with the support of the Government (as housing is a devolved matter, the service currently only extends to England).

The annual number of homeless households in England peaked in 2003–04 at 135,420 before falling to a low of 40,020 in 2009–10. In 2017–18, there were 56,600 homeless households, which was 60 percent below the 2003–04 peak, and 40 percent higher than the 2009–10 low. The UK has more than 120,000 children in temporary accommodation, a number which has increased from 69,050 children in 2010.

In 2007 the official figures for England were that an average of 498 people slept rough each night, with 248 of those in London.

Homelessness in England since 2010 has been rising. By 2016 it is estimated the number sleeping rough had more than doubled since 2010. The National Audit Office said about homelessness in England 2010–17 there has been a 60 percent rise in households living in temporary accommodation and a rise of 134 percent in rough sleepers. It is estimated 4,751 people bedded down outside overnight in England in 2017, up 15 percent over the previous year. The housing charity Shelter used data from four sets of official 2016 statistics and calculated 254,514 people in England were homeless.

The Homelessness Reduction Bill 2016–17 places a new duty on local authorities in England to assist people threatened with homelessness within 56 days and to assess, prevent and relieve homelessness for all eligible applicants including single homeless people from April 2018. Before the 2017 HRA, homeless households were defined and measured as those who were owed a 'main homelessness duty' by local authorities. But since 2018, the definition of homeless households has broadened as households are owed a new relief duty and a prevention duty. The main homelessness duty definition has not been changed by the 2017 HRA. However, these households are now only owed a main duty if their homelessness has not been successfully prevented or relieved. In 2019–20, 288,470 households were owed the new prevention or relief duties, which is four times the number of households owed the 'main duty' in 2017–18 before implementation of the Homelessness Reduction Act.

Research into Women's Homelessness in London has found that the situations people face may vary based on their background and/or experience. This is known as multiple disadvantage, released in March 2023 found over 154 women sleeping rough in just one week. This project was made in collaboration with SHP, St Mungo's, the Women's Development Unit (Solace Women's Aid and The Connection at St Martin's London Councils and the GLA alongside researchers from PraxisCollab.

===== Scotland =====
The picture in Scotland is considerably different, with laws that entitle everyone to a roof over their head if they are homeless. This accommodation is often in the form of somewhere temporary until something permanent becomes available. Though across the course of 2022, this will change, reducing the use of temporary accommodation, in line with the Homeless and Rough Sleeping Action Group (HARSAG) recommendations. Currently people are spending an average of 199 days (April 2020 to March 2021) in temporary accommodation before being housed in somewhere permanent.

Most recently updated in October 2020, Scotland is working to eradicate homelessness through the 'Ending Homelessness Together' action plan. It is anticipated that with this, alongside a focus on prevention, and Local Authorities working with the third sector on plans known as Rapid Rehousing Transition Plans, that people will no longer be homeless for any length of time.

In terms of figures, in 2020–21, there were 42,149 people in homeless households – 30,345 adults and 11,804 children in Scotland. This was a drop of nine percent from the previous year, though it is unclear if this was partly due to statistics being collected differently during the start of the pandemic.

=== Americas ===
==== Canada ====
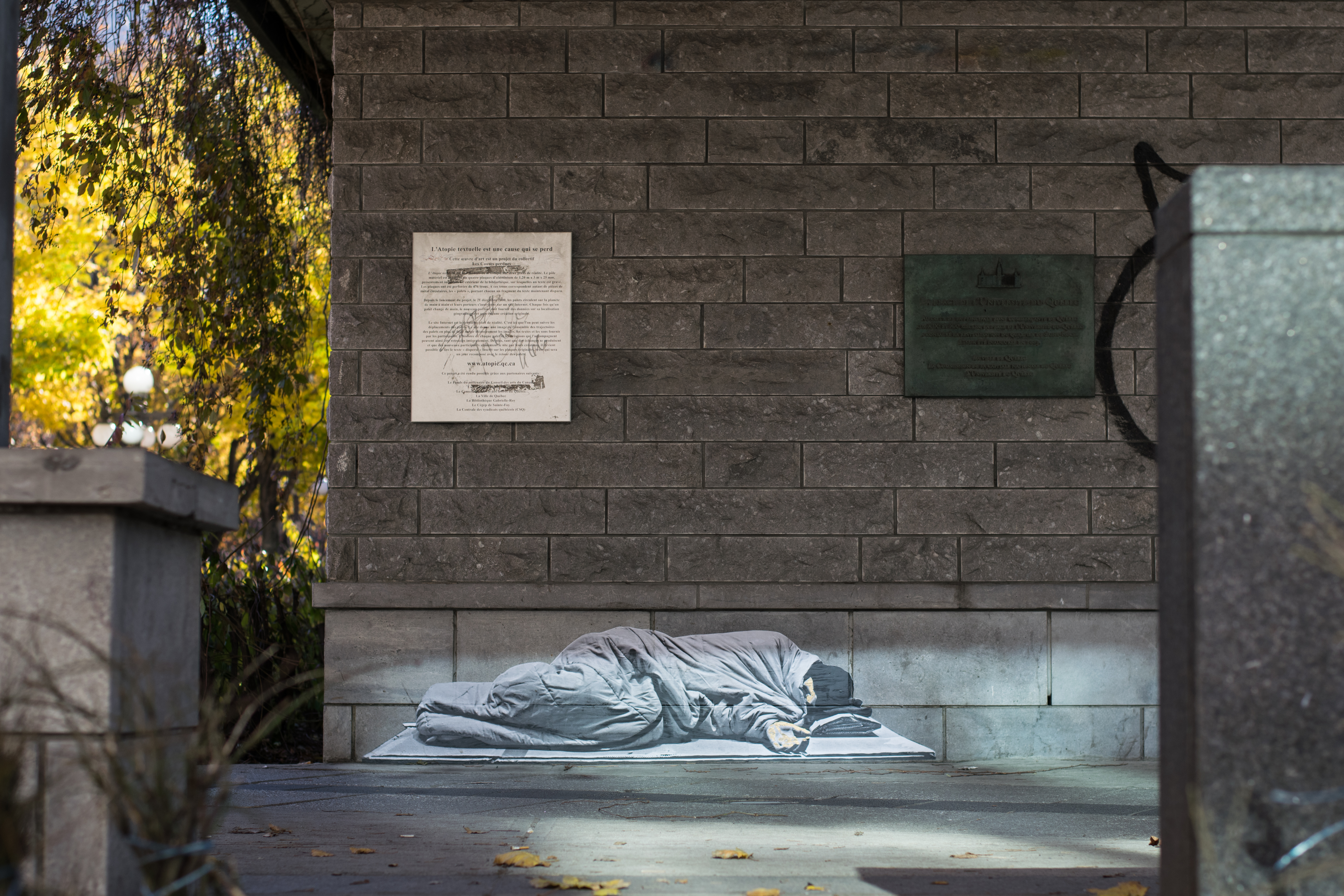
Graffiti of homeless in Quebec City

Homelessness in Canada refers to the condition of individuals and families lacking stable, permanent, and adequate housing, and includes both visible forms of homelessness (such as living in shelters or public spaces) and less visible forms such as crisis accommodation, couch surfing, or living in unsafe or overcrowded conditions.

The Canadian government housing policies and programs in place throughout the 1970s were based on a concept of shelter as a basic need or requirement for survival and of the obligation of government and society to provide adequate housing for everyone.

==== United States ====
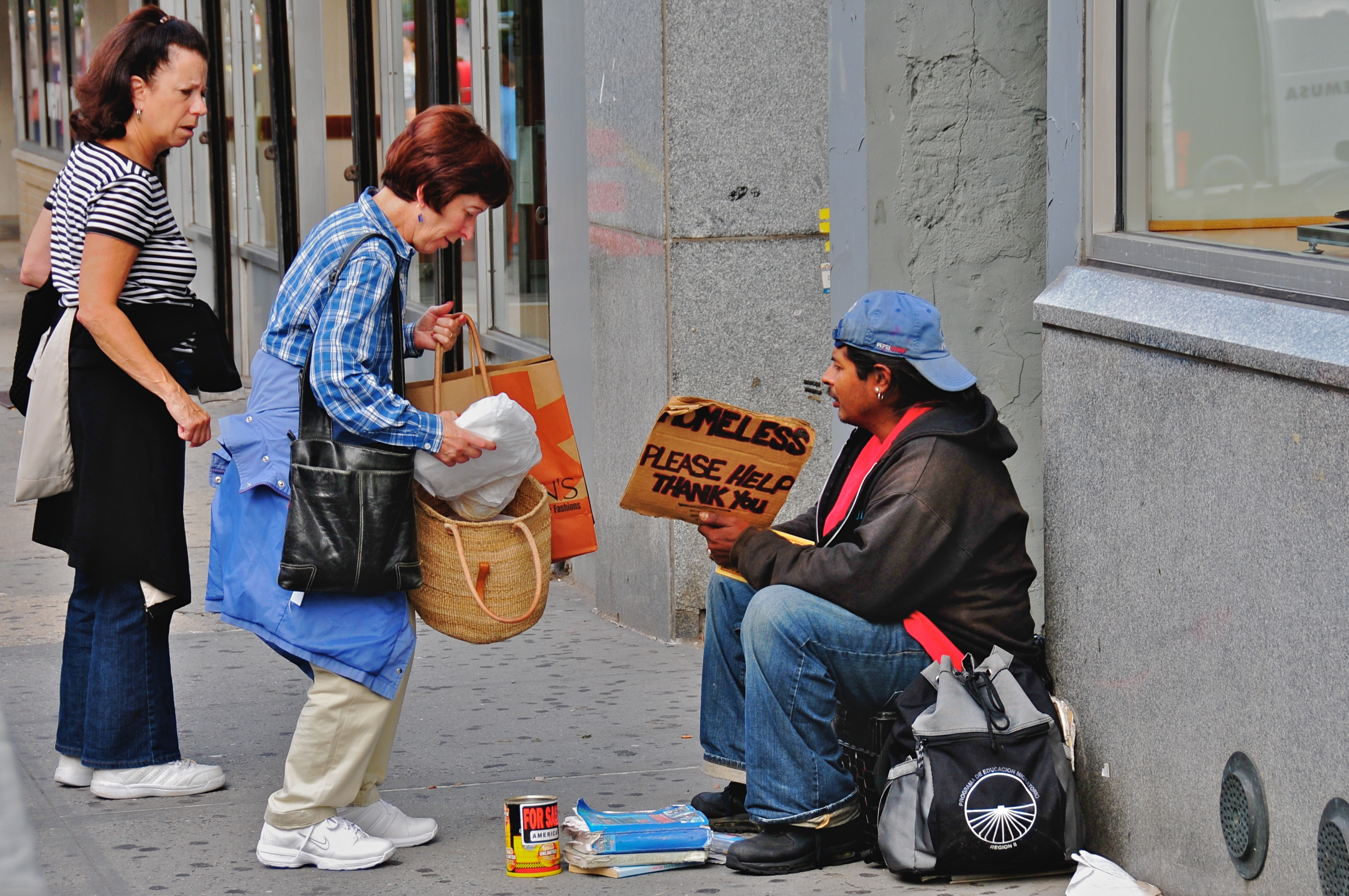
A woman giving a homeless man food in New York City, United States (2008)

After Franklin D. Roosevelt took over the presidency from Herbert Hoover in 1933, he oversaw the passage of the New Deal, which greatly expanded social welfare, including providing funds to build public housing. This marked the end of the Great Depression. However, the number of homeless people grew in the 1980s, when Ronald Reagan decimated the public housing budget in the 1980s, including the federally funded affordable housing production put in place by the New Deal. By the mid-1980s, there was a dramatic increase in family homelessness. Tied into this was an increasing number of impoverished and runaway children, teenagers, and young adults, which created a new substratum of the homeless population (street children or street youth).

In 2015, the United States reported that there were 564,708 homeless people within its borders, one of the higher reported figures worldwide.

Housing First is an initiative to help homeless people reintegrate into society, and out of homeless shelters. It was initiated by the federal government's Interagency Council on Homelessness. It asks cities to come up with a plan to end chronic homelessness. In this direction, there is the belief that if homeless people are given independent housing to start, with some proper social support, then there would be no need for emergency homeless shelters, which it considers a good outcome. However, this is a controversial position.

There is evidence that the Housing First program works more efficiently than Treatment First programs. Studies show that having the stability of housing through the Housing First program will encourage homeless people to focus on other struggles they are facing, such as substance abuse. Meanwhile, Treatment First programs promote an "all or nothing" approach which requires clients to participate in programs applicable to their struggles as a condition for housing assistance. Treatment First utilizes a less individualistic approach than Housing First and solutions are created under one standard rather than fit each client's specific needs.

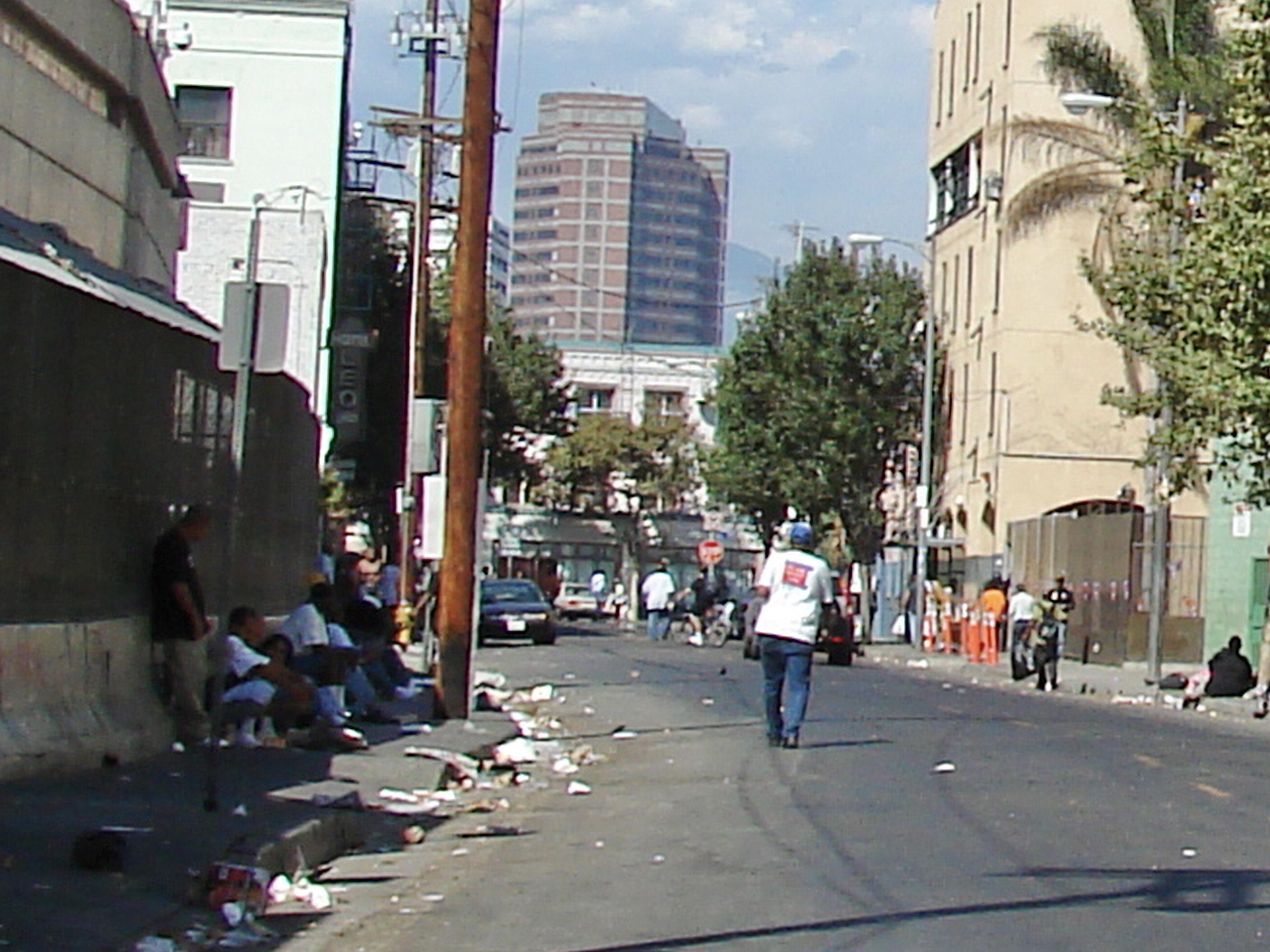
Skid Row, Los Angeles contains one of the largest stable populations, between 5,000 and 8,000, of homeless people in the United States.

In 2009 it was estimated that one out of 50 children or 1.5 million children in the United States would experience some form of homelessness each year.

In 2010 in New York City, where there were over 36,000 homeless people in 2009, there was a mobile video exhibit in the streets showing a homeless person on a screen and asking onlookers and passersby to text with their cellphones a message for him, and they also could donate money by cellphones to the organization Pathways to Housing. In September 2010, it was reported that the Housing First Initiative had significantly reduced the chronic homeless single person population in Boston, Massachusetts, although homeless families were still increasing in number. Some shelters were reducing the number of beds due to lowered numbers of homeless, and some emergency shelter facilities were closing, especially the emergency Boston Night Center. In 2011, the Department of Veterans Affairs Supportive Services for Veterans Families Initiative, SSVF, began funding private non-profit organizations and consumer cooperatives to provide supportive services to very low-income veteran families living in or transitioning to permanent housing.

In 2019, in an interview with CBS News, scholar Sara Goldrick-Rab said that her study on college student homelessness found that "[n]early one in ten college students said they were homeless in the last year, meaning they had at least one night where they did not know where they were going to sleep."

With an increase of 118,300 the number of homeless individuals rose to approximately 771,400 in 2024. From 2022 homelessness has increased 30 percent in 2024 from 1.75 per 1,000 people in 2022 to 2.3 per 1,000 people. Between 2023 and 2024 the number of homeless children under the age of 18 grew as well by around 33 percent.

==== Puerto Rico ====
According to the count by the Puerto Rico Department of Family, in January 2017 there were 3,501 homeless persons in the territory. The study shows that 26 percent of this population lives in the capital, San Juan. Other municipality's percentage of this population was Ponce at 6.3 percent, Arecibo at six percent, Caguas at 5.3 percent, and Mayagüez at 4.7 percent. Results from the study determined that 76 percent of the homeless population were men, and 24 percent were women and that both men and women populations, were on average age, 40 years old. This steadily increasing population might have increased more drastically as a result of Hurricane María which caused over 90 billion dollars in damage to the island of Puerto Rico.

Data provided by the Department of Community Social Development of San Juan indicates that in 1988 the number of homeless people in the municipality was 368, while in 2017 there were about 877 persons without a home. While the average age for the overall homeless population is 40 years old for both women and men, in San Juan the median is 48 years for men and 43 years for women. Other data obtained showed that more than 50 percent have university-level education. Also, it revealed that 35 percent of men and 25 percent of women have relapsed more than four times after unsuccessful attempts to reinsert themselves socially. Reasons given for wandering are varied with the most common causes being drug abuse (30.6%), family problems (22.4%), financial or economic problems (15.0%), and others such as unemployment, mental health problems, domestic violence, evictions, or lack of support when released from prison.

=== Oceania ===
==== Australia ====
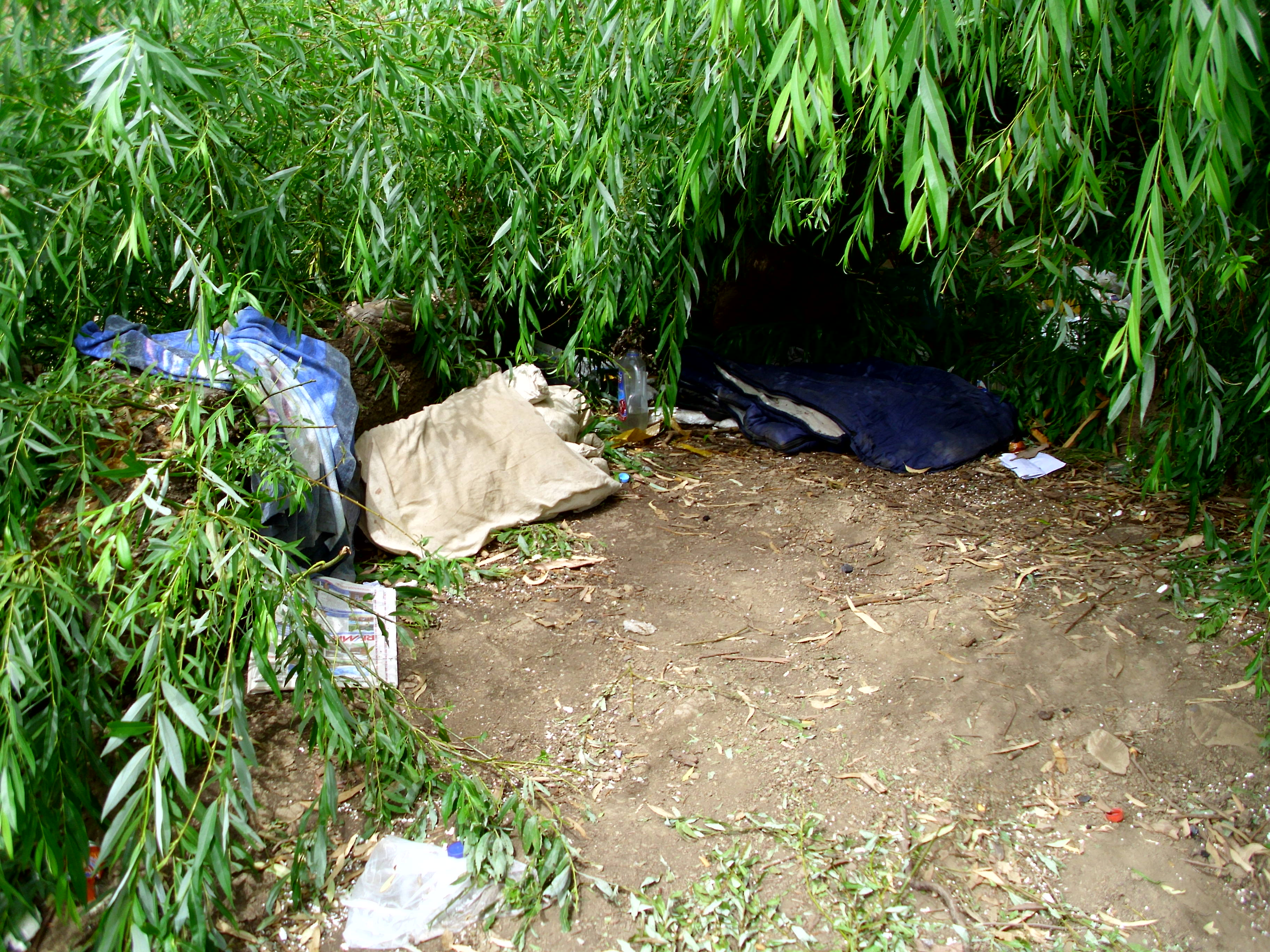
A homeless person's shelter under a fallen willow tree in Australia

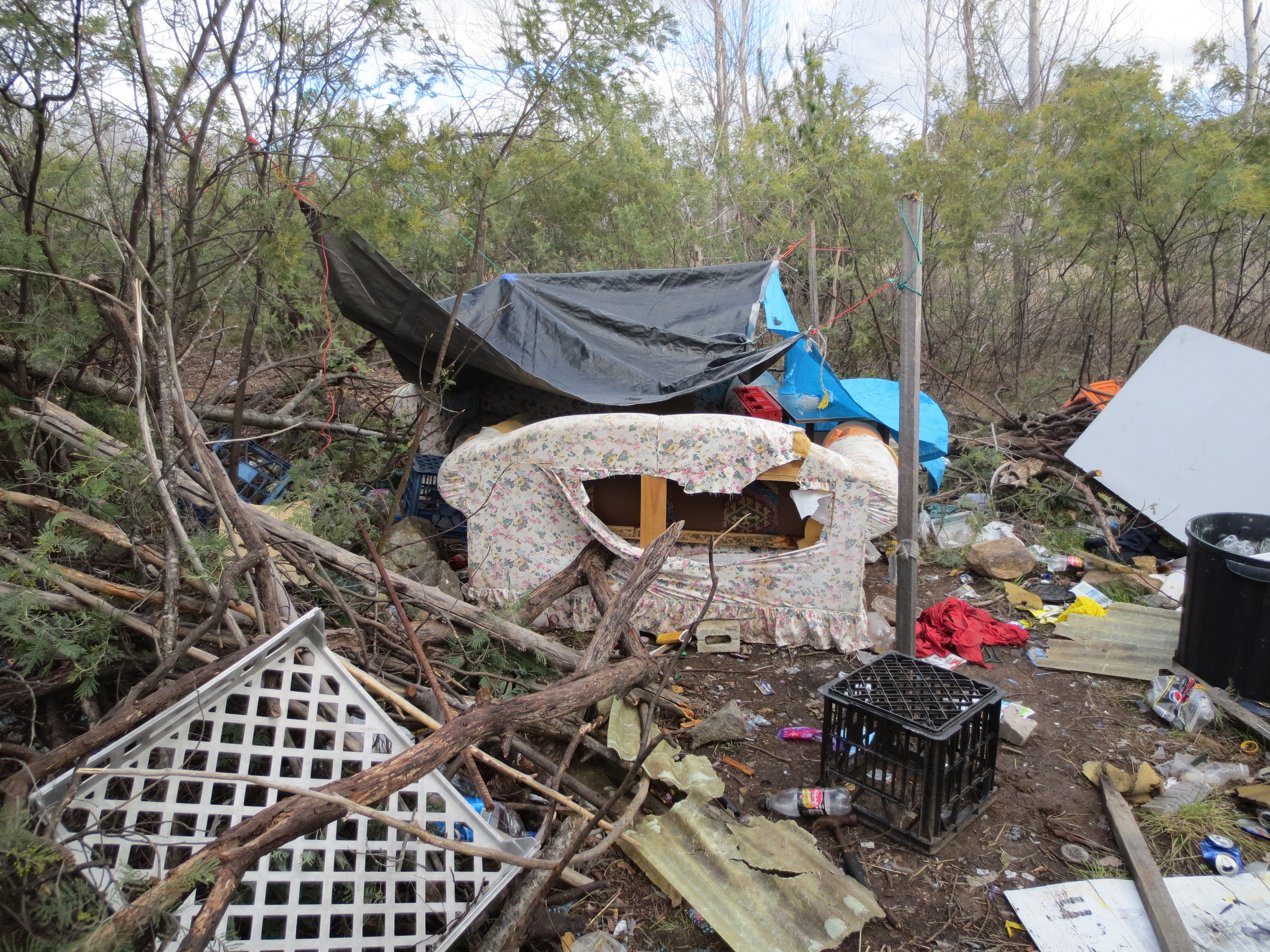
Abandoned transient encampment in Mawson, ACT

In Australia, the Supported Accommodation Assistance Program (SAAP) is a joint Commonwealth and state government program which provides funding for more than 1,200 organizations that are aimed to assist homeless people or those in danger of becoming homeless, as well as women and children escaping domestic violence. They provide accommodation such as refuges, shelters, and half-way houses, and offer a range of supported services.

The Commonwealth assigned over $800 million between 2000 and 2005 for the continuation of SAAP. The current program, governed by the Supported Assistance Act 1994, specifies that "the overall aim of SAAP is to provide transitional supported accommodation and related support services, to help people who are homeless to achieve the maximum possible degree of self-reliance and independence. This legislation has been established to help the homeless people of the nation and help rebuild the lives of those in need. The cooperation of the states also helps enhance the meaning of the legislation and demonstrates their desire to improve the nation as best they can." In 2011, the Specialist Homelessness Services (SHS) program replaced the SAAP program.

Somewhere between 100,000 and 150,000 people are estimated to be experiencing the effects homelessness in Australia – 56% were male, 21% were aged 25–34 and 20% were Aboriginal and Torres Strait Islander (First Nations) people (ABS 2023). The highest rate of homelessness was in the Northern Territory (564 people per 10,000 population), while the lowest was in Western Australia (37 people per 10,000).

==== New Zealand ====
Homelessness in New Zealand has been linked to the general issue of lack of suitable housing. The population of homeless people is generally measured through the country's census and by universities and other academic centres. In 2009, urban homelessness (rough sleepers or improvised dwellings) were estimated at less than 300, while rural homelessness (improvised dwellings) was estimated at between 500 and 1000. An additional 8,000–20,000 people live in "temporary accommodation unsuited for long-term habitation (caravans, campgrounds, substandard housing, and boarding houses)." Homelessness in New Zealand has traditionally been reduced by the provision of state housing, similar to Germany and other developed countries.

Statistical authorities in New Zealand have expanded their definition of homelessness to include 'people living in improvised shelters', 'people staying in camping grounds/motor camps', and 'people sharing accommodation with someone else's household'.

The issue is believed to have become increasingly visible in recent years. Media in New Zealand have published an accusatory account of the presence of homeless people in public spaces, positioning homeless men as disruptive threats. Though community members have shown support by writing opinion pieces.

In January 2019, The New York Times reported rising housing prices to be a major factor in the increasing homelessness in New Zealand so that "smaller markets like Tauranga, a coastal city on the North Island with a population of 128,000, had seen an influx of people who had left Auckland in search of more affordable housing. Average property values in Tauranga had risen to $497,000 from $304,000 in the last five years, and Demographia now rated it among the 10 least affordable cities in the world – along with famously expensive locales such as Hong Kong, San Francisco, Sydney and Vancouver, British Columbia."

In August 2019, the Associate Housing Minister Kris Faafoi and Social Development Minister Carmel Sepuloni announced that the Government would be launching an NZ$54 million program to tackle homelessness in New Zealand. This includes investing $31 million over the next four years for 67 intensive case managers and navigators to work with homeless people and a further $16 million for the Sustaining Tenancies Programme. This funding complements the Government's Housing First programme.

=== Russia and the USSR ===
After the abolition of serfdom in Russia in 1861, major cities experienced a large influx of former peasants who sought jobs as industrial workers in rapidly developing Russian industry. These people often lived in harsh conditions, sometimes renting a room shared between several families. There also was a large number of shelterless homeless people. Immediately after the October Revolution a special program of "compression" (уплотнение) was enabled: people who had no shelter were settled in flats of those who had large (4, 5, or 6-room) flats with only one room left to previous owners. The flat was declared state property. This led to a large number of shared flats where several families lived simultaneously. Nevertheless, the problem of complete homelessness was mostly solved as anybody could apply for a room or a place in a dormitory (the number of shared flats steadily decreased after the large-scale residential building program was implemented starting in the 1960s).

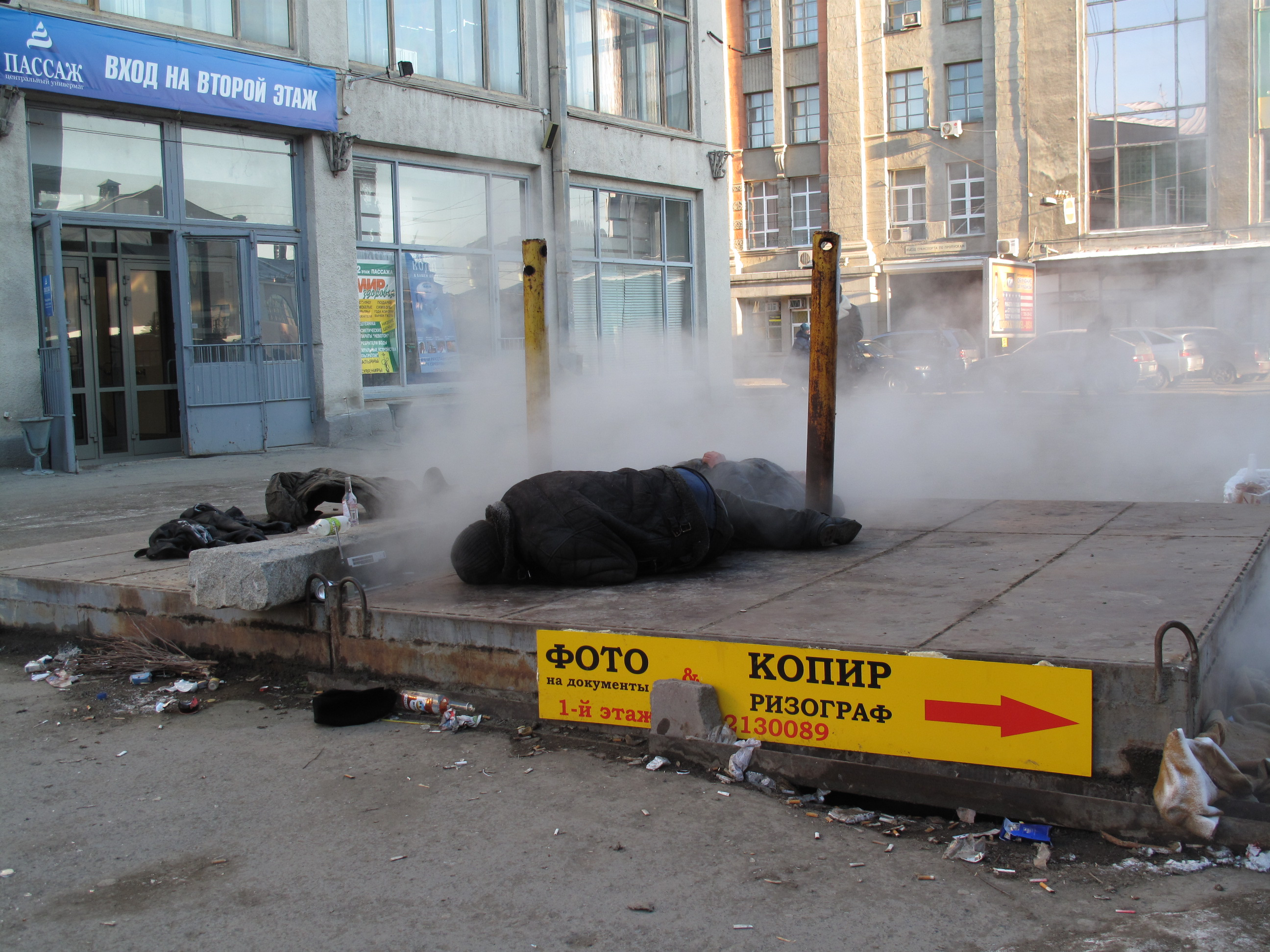
Homeless people sleeping outside in winter in Yekaterinburg, Russia

By 1922 there were at least seven million homeless children in Russia as a result of nearly a decade of devastation from World War I and the Russian Civil War. This led to the creation of a large number of orphanages. By the 1930s the USSR declared the abolition of homelessness and any citizen was obliged to have a propiska – a place of permanent residency. Nobody could be stripped of propiska without substitution or refuse it without a confirmed permission (called "order") to register in another place. If someone wanted to move to another city or expand their living area, he had to find a partner who wanted to mutually exchange the flats. The right to shelter was secured in the Soviet constitution. Not having permanent residency was considered a crime.

After the breakup of the USSR, the problem of homelessness sharpened dramatically, partially because of the legal vacuum of the early 1990s with some laws contradicting each other, and partially because of a high rate of fraud in the realty market. In 1991 articles 198 and 209 of the Russian criminal code which instituted a criminal penalty for not having permanent residence were abolished. In Moscow, the first overnight shelter for homeless people was opened in 1992. In the late 1990s, certain amendments in law were implemented to reduce the rise in homelessness, such as the prohibition of selling last flats with registered children. In 2002, there were 300,000 homeless people in Moscow.

Nevertheless, the state is still obliged to give permanent shelter for free to anybody who needs better living conditions or has no permanent registration, because the right to shelter is still included in the constitution. Several projects of special cheap 'social' flats for those who failed to repay mortgages were proposed to facilitate the mortgage market.

In 2022, it was reported that Russian authorities were targeting homeless people to conscript them into the war in Ukraine.

== Developed and developing countries ==
In western countries such as the United States, the typical homeless person is male and single, with the Netherlands reporting 80 percent of homeless people aged 18–65 to be men. Some cities have particularly high percentages of males in homeless populations, with men comprising 85 percent of the homeless in Dublin, Ireland. Non-white people are also overrepresented in homeless populations, with such groups two and one-half times more likely to be homeless in the U.S. The median age of homeless people is approximately 35.

=== Developed countries ===
In 2005, an estimated 100 million people worldwide were homeless. The following statistics indicate the approximate average number of homeless people at any one time. Each country has a different approach to counting homeless people, and estimates of homelessness made by different organizations vary wildly, so comparisons should be made with caution.

European Union: 3,000,000 (UN-HABITAT 2004)
England: 11,580 single households were assessed as rough sleeping at the point of approach in 2021, up 39 percent from 2019–20, with 119,400 households owed a prevention duty in 2020–21
Scotland: 27,571 households were assessed as homeless in 2020 – 21, a decrease of 13 percent compared to 2019/20
Canada: 150,000
Australia: On census night in 2006 there were 105,000 people homeless across Australia, an increase from the 99,900 Australians who were counted as homeless in the 2001 census

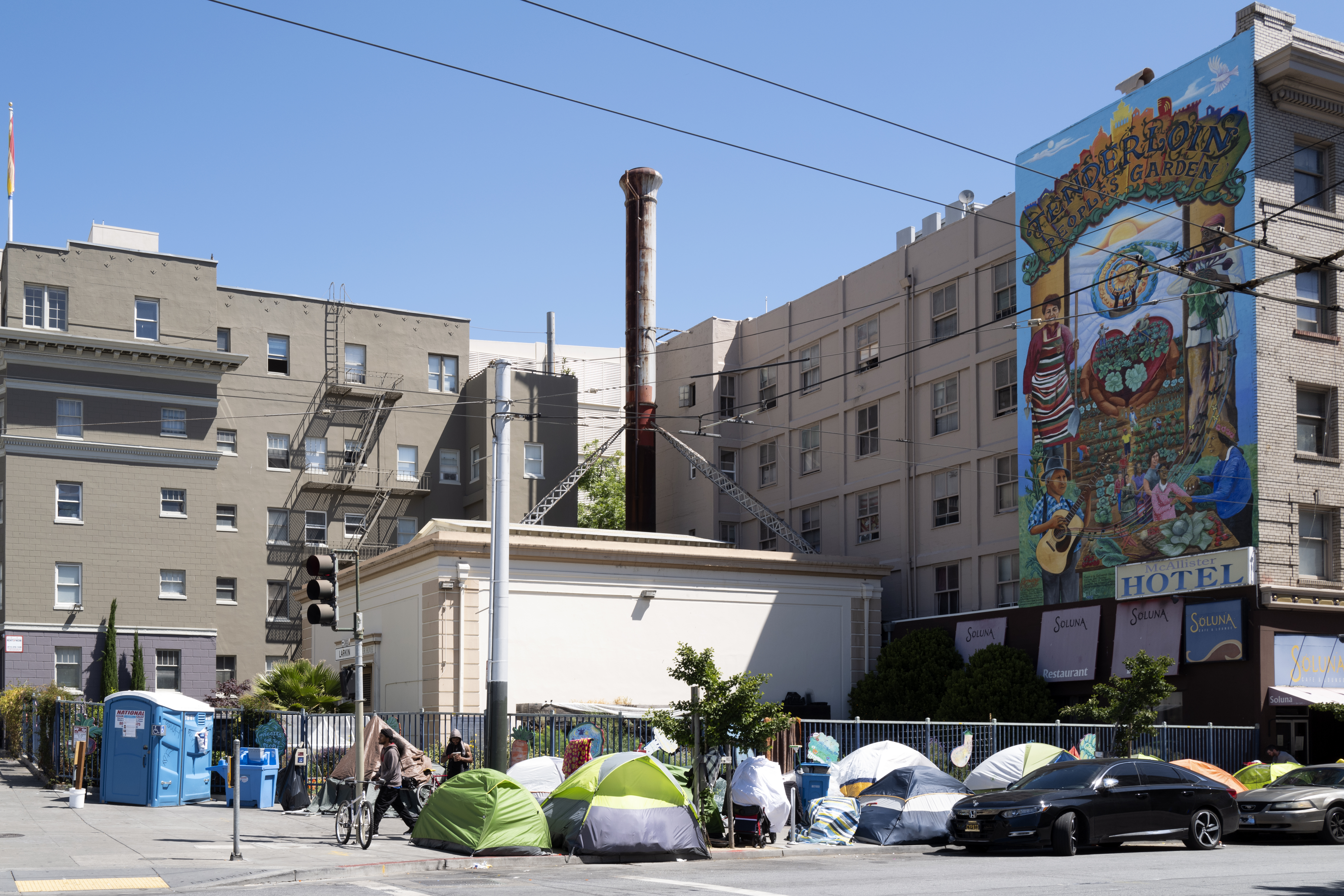
Tents of homeless people in San Francisco, California, May 2020

United States: The HUD 2018 Annual Homeless Assessment Report (AHAR) to Congress reports that in a single night, roughly 553,000 people were experiencing homelessness in the United States. According to HUD's July 2010 fifth Homeless Assessment Report to Congress, in a single night in January 2010, the single-point analysis reported to HUD showed 649,917 people experiencing homelessness. This number had increased from January 2009's 643,067. The unsheltered count increased by 2.8 percent while the sheltered count remained the same. Also, HUD reported the number of chronically homeless people (persons with severe disabilities and long homeless histories) decreased by one percent between 2009 and 2010, from 110,917 to 109,812. Since 2007 this number had decreased by 11 percent. This was mostly due to the expansion of permanent supportive housing programs.

The change in numbers has occurred due to the prevalence of homelessness in local communities rather than other changes. According to HUD's July 2010 Homeless Assessment Report to Congress, more than 1.59 million people spent at least one night in an emergency shelter or transitional housing program during the 2010 reporting period, a 2.2 percent increase from 2009. Most users of homeless shelters used only an emergency shelter, while 17 percent used only transitional housing, and less than 5 percent used both during the reporting period. Since 2007, the annual number of those using homeless shelters in cities has decreased from 1.22 million to 1.02 million, a 17 percent decrease. The number of persons using homeless shelters in suburban and rural areas increased by 57 percent, from 367,000 to 576,000. In the U.S., the federal government's HUD agency has required federally-funded organizations to use a computer tracking system for homeless people and their statistics, called HMIS (Homeless Management Information System). There has been some opposition to this kind of tracking by privacy advocacy groups, such as EPIC.

However, HUD considers its reporting techniques to be reasonably accurate for homeless in shelters and programs in its Annual Homeless Assessment Report to Congress. Determining and counting the number of homeless is very difficult in general due to their lifestyle habits. There are so-called "hidden homeless" (A form of homeless a form of homelessness where people lack stable, long-term housing but don't fit the typical public image of being on the street) out of sight of the normal population and perhaps staying on private property. Various countries, states, and cities have come up with different means and techniques to calculate an approximate count. For example, a one-night "homeless census count", called a point-in-time (PIT) count, usually held in early winter for the year, is a technique used by several American cities, such as Boston. Los Angeles uses a mixed set of techniques for counting, including the PIT street count.

In 2003, The United States Department of Housing and Urban Development (HUD) had begun requiring a PIT count in all "Continuum of Care" communities which required them to report a count of people, housing status, and geographic locations of individuals counted. Some communities provide sub-population information to the PIT, such as information on veterans, youth, and elderly individuals, as done in Boston.

Japan: 20,000–100,000 (some figures put it at 200,000–400,000). Reports show that homelessness is on the rise in Japan since the mid-1990s. There are more homeless men than homeless women in Japan because it is usually easier for women to get a job and they are less isolated than men. Also, Japanese families usually provide more support for women than they do for men.

=== Developing countries ===
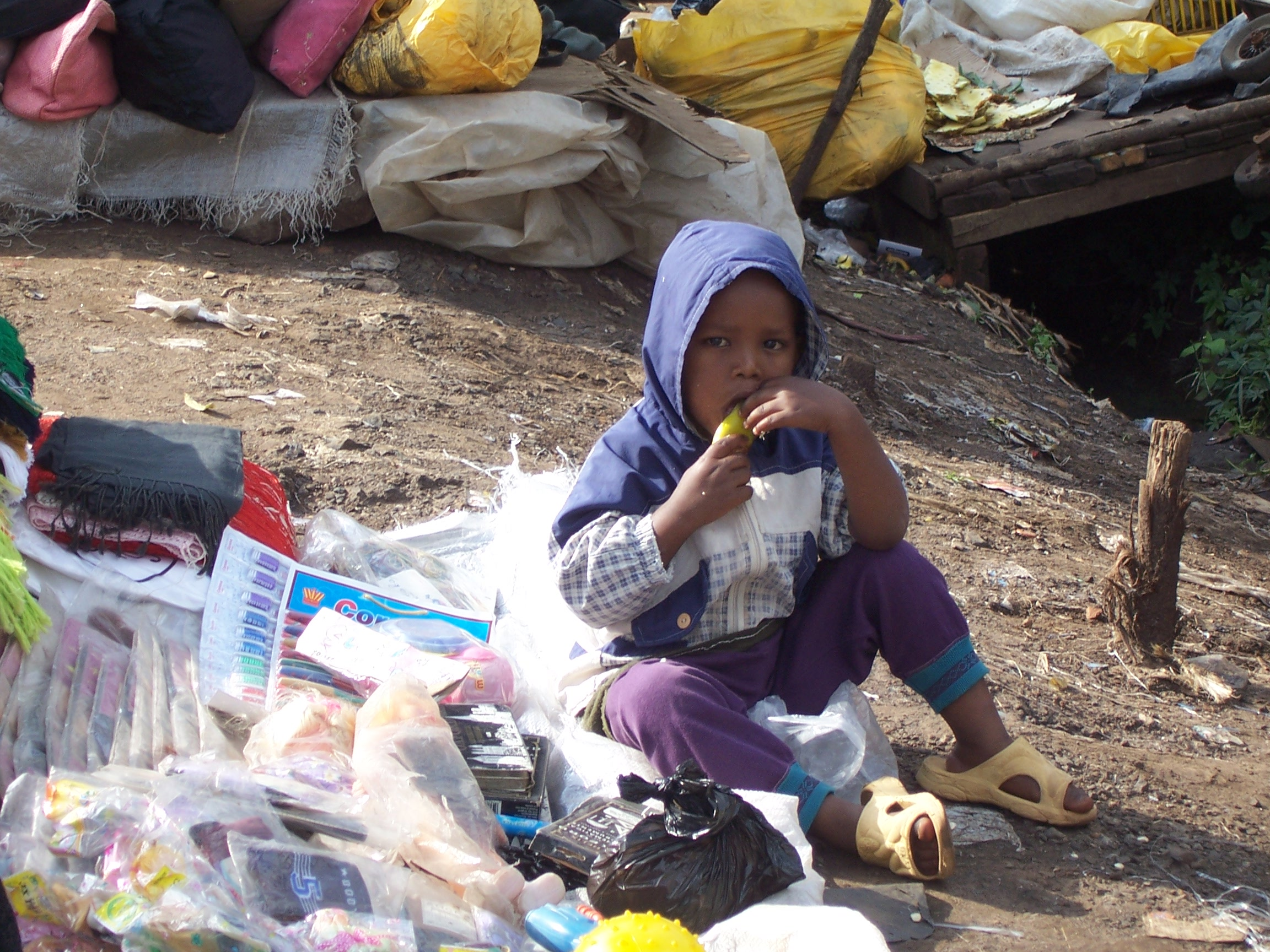
Street child in Kenya

The number of homeless people worldwide grew steadily in 2005. In some developing countries such as Nigeria and South Africa, homelessness is rampant, with millions of children living and working on the streets. Homelessness has become a problem in the countries of China, India, Thailand, Indonesia, and the Philippines despite their growing prosperity, partly due to migrant workers who have trouble finding permanent homes.

Determining the true number of homeless people worldwide varies between 100 million and one billion people based on the exact definition used. Refugees, asylum-seekers, and internally displaced persons can also be considered homeless in that they, too, experience "marginalization, minority status, socioeconomic disadvantage, poor physical health, the collapse of social supports, psychological distress, and difficulty adapting to host cultures" such as the domestic homeless.

In the past twenty years, scholars such as Tipple and Speak have begun to refer to homelessness as the "antithesis or absence of home" rather than rooflessness or the "lack of physical shelter." This complication in the homelessness debate further delineates the idea that home consists of an adequate shelter, an experienced and dynamic place that serves as a "base" for nurturing human relationships and the "free development of individuals" and their identity. Thus, the home is perceived to be an extension of one's self and identity. In contrast, the homeless experience, according to Moore, constitutes more as a "lack of belonging" and a loss of identity that leads to individuals or communities feeling "out of place" once they can no longer call a place of their own home.

This new perspective on homelessness sheds light on the plight of refugees, a population of stateless people who are not normally included in the mainstream definition of homelessness. It has also created problems for researchers because the nature of "counting" homeless people across the globe relies heavily on who is considered a homeless person. Homeless individuals, and by extension refugees, can be seen as lacking lack the "crucible of our modern society" and lacking a way of actively belonging to and engaging with their respective communities or cultures. As Casavant demonstrates, a spectrum of definitions for homelessness, called the "continuum of homelessness", should refer to refugees as homeless individuals because they not only lose their homes, but are also afflicted with a myriad of problems that parallel those affecting the domestic homeless, such as "[a lack of] stable, safe and healthy housing, an extremely low income, adverse discrimination in access to services, with problems of mental health, alcohol, and drug abuse or social disorganization". Refugees, like domestic homeless people, lose their source of identity and way of connecting with their culture for an indefinite period.

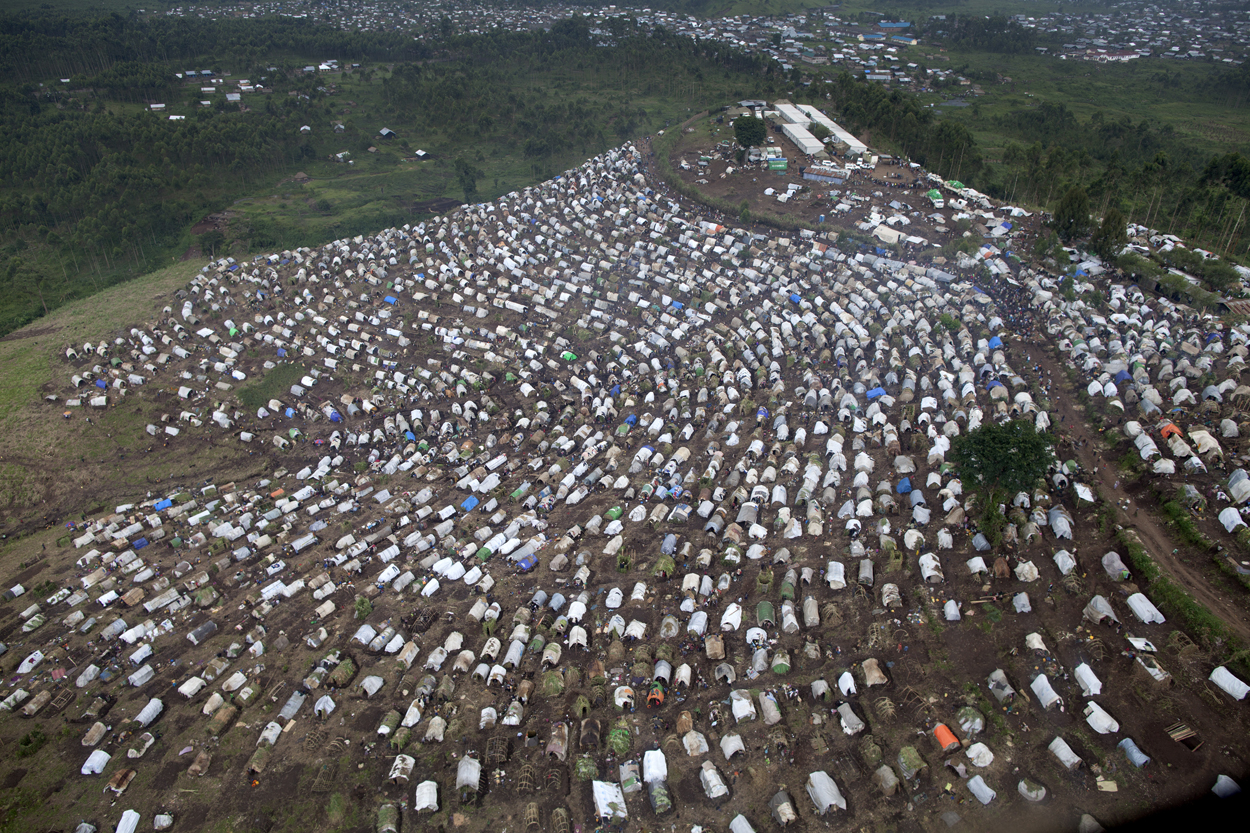
Refugee camp in the Democratic Republic of Congo, 2013

Thus, the current definition of homelessness allows people to simplistically assume that homeless people, including refugees, are merely "without a place to live" when that is not the case. As numerous studies show, forced migration and displacement bring with it another host of problems including socioeconomic instability, "increased stress, isolation, and new responsibilities" in a completely new environment.

For people in Russia, especially the youth, alcohol, and substance use is a major cause and reason for becoming and continuing to be homeless. The United Nations Centre for Human Settlements (UN-Habitat) wrote in its Global Report on Human Settlements in 1995: "Homelessness is a problem in developed as well as in developing countries. In London, for example, life expectancy among homeless people is more than 25 years lower than the national average."

Poor urban housing conditions are a global problem, but conditions are worst in developing countries. Habitat says that today 600 million people live in life- and health-threatening homes in Africa, Asia, and Latin America. For example, more than three in four young people had insufficient means of shelter and sanitation in some African countries like Malawi. The report further states, "The threat of mass homelessness is greatest in those regions because that is where the population is growing fastest. By 2015, the 10 largest cities in the world will be in Asia, Latin America, and Africa. Nine of them will be in developing countries: Mumbai, India – 27.4 million; Lagos, Nigeria – 24.4; Shanghai, China – 23.4; Jakarta, Indonesia – 21.2; São Paulo, Brazil – 20.8; Karachi, Pakistan – 20.6; Beijing, China – 19.4; Dhaka, Bangladesh – 19; Mexico City, Mexico – 18.8. The only city in a developed country that will be in the top ten is Tokyo, Japan – 28.7 million."

In 2008, Dr. Anna Tibaijuka, executive director of UN-HABITAT, referring to the recent report "State of the World's Cities Report 2008/2009", said that the world economic crisis we are in should be viewed as a "housing finance crisis" in which the poorest of the poor were left to fend for themselves.

== Refuges and alternative accommodation ==
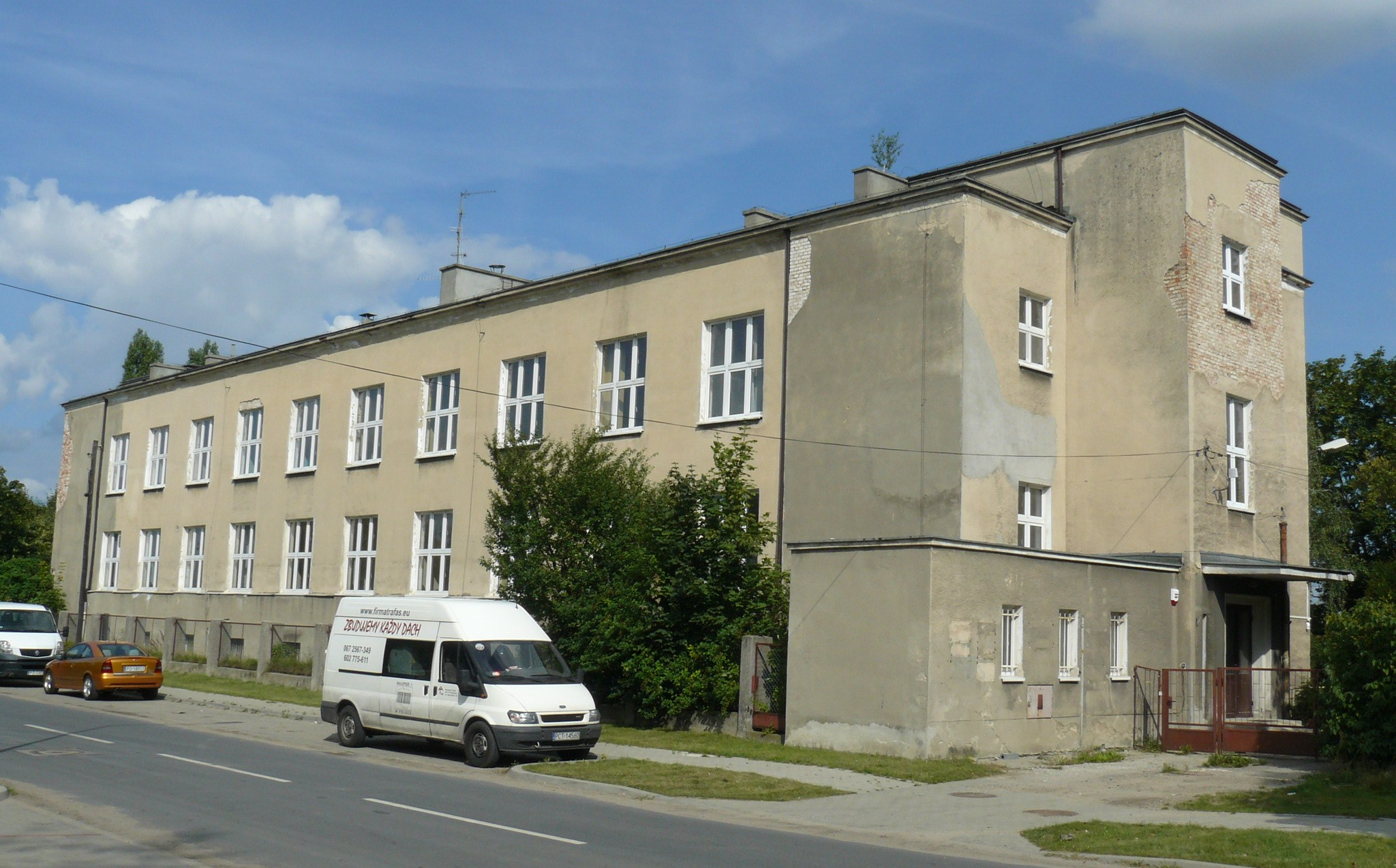
Shelter for homeless people in Poznan, Poland

There are various places where a homeless person might seek refuge. Homeless shelters in one common option for homeless people. These shelters are sometimes emergency cold-weather shelters opened by churches or community agencies or temporary Christmas Shelters, which may consist of cots in a heated warehouse. More elaborate homeless shelters such as Pinellas Hope in Florida provide residents with a recreation tent, a dining tent, laundry facilities, outdoor tents, casitas, and shuttle services that help inhabitants get to their jobs each day.

Public places are another option, including parks, bus or train stations, public libraries, airports, public transportation vehicles (by continual riding where unlimited passes are available), hospital lobbies or waiting areas, college campuses, and 24-hour businesses such as coffee shops. Many public places use security guards or police to prevent people from loitering or sleeping at these locations for a variety of reasons, including image, safety, and comfort of patrons. Finding refuge outdoors, on the ground or in a sleeping bag, tent, or improvised shelter, such as a large cardboard box, under a bridge, in an urban doorway, in a park, or in a vacant lot, is also common. Tunnels such as abandoned subway, maintenance, or train tunnels are popular among long-term or permanent homeless people. The inhabitants of such refuges are called in some places, like New York City, "Mole People". Natural caves beneath urban centers allow for places where people can congregate. Leaking water pipes, electric wires, and steam pipes allow for some of the essentials of living.

Couch surfing is a temporary sleeping arrangement in dwellings of friends or family members ("couch surfing"). This can also include housing in exchange for labor or sex. Couch surfers may be harder to recognize than street homeless people and are often omitted from housing counts.

Vehicles like cars or trucks are used as temporary or sometimes long-term living quarters, for example by those recently evicted from a home. Some people live in recreational vehicles (RVs), school buses, vans, sport utility vehicles, covered pickup trucks, station wagons, sedans, or hatchbacks. The vehicular homeless, according to homeless advocates and researchers, comprise the fastest-growing segment of the homeless population. Many cities have safe parking programs in which lawful sites are permitted at churches or in other out-of-the-way locations. For example, because it is illegal to park on the street in Santa Barbara, California, the New Beginnings Counseling Center worked with the city to make designated parking lots available to homeless people.

Single room occupancy (more commonly abbreviated to SRO) is a form of housing that is typically aimed at residents with low or minimal incomes who rent small, furnished single rooms with a bed, chair, and sometimes a small desk. SRO units may be rented out as a permanent or primary residence to individuals, within a multi-tenant building where tenants share a kitchen, toilets or bathrooms. In the 2010s, some SRO units may have a small refrigerator, microwave, and sink.(also called a "residential hotel").

24-hour Internet cafes are now used by over 5,000 Japanese "Net cafe refugees". An estimated 75 percent of Japan's 3,200 all-night internet cafes cater to regular overnight guests, who in some cases have become their main source of income. 24-hour McDonald's restaurants are also used by "McRefugees" in Japan, China, and Hong Kong. There are about 250 McRefugees in Hong Kong.

Tent cities are ad hoc campsites of tents and improvised shelters consisting of tarpaulins and blankets, often near industrial and institutionally zoned real estate such as rail yards, highways and high transportation veins. A few more elaborate tent cities, such as Dignity Village, are hybrids of tent cities and shantytowns. Tent cities frequently consist only of tents and fabric-improvised structures, with no semi-permanent structures at all.

Inexpensive boarding houses, which have also been called flophouses, offer cheap, low-quality temporary lodging. Inexpensive motels also offer cheap, low-quality temporary lodging. However, some who can afford housing live in a motel by choice. For example, David and Jean Davidson spent 22 years at various U.K. Travelodges.

Shantytowns are ad hoc dwelling sites of improvised shelters and shacks, usually near rail yards, interstates and high transportation veins. Some shantytowns have interstitial tenting areas, but the predominant feature consists of hard structures. Each pad or site tends to accumulate roofing, sheathing, plywood, and nailed two-by-fours.

Squatting is living in an unoccupied structure where a homeless person may live without payment and the owner's knowledge or permission. Often these buildings are long abandoned and not safe to occupy.

=== Other housing options ===
Transitional housing provides temporary housing for certain segments of the homeless population, including the working homeless, and is meant to transition residents into permanent, affordable housing. This is usually a room or apartment in a residence with support services. The transitional time can be relatively short, for example, one or two years, and in that time the person must file for and obtain permanent housing along with gainful employment or income, even if Social Security or assistance. Sometimes transitional housing programs charge a room and board fee, maybe 30 percent of an individual's income, which is sometimes partially or fully refunded after the person procures a permanent residence. In the U.S., federal funding for transitional housing programs was originally allocated in the McKinney–Vento Homeless Assistance Act of 1986.

Foyers are a specific type of transitional housing designed for homeless or at-risk teens. Foyers are generally institutions that provide affordable accommodation as well as support and training services for residents. They were pioneered in the 1990s in the United Kingdom, but have been adopted in areas in Australia and the United States as well.

Supportive housing is a combination of housing and services intended as a cost-effective way to help people live more stable, productive lives. Supportive housing works well for those who face the most complex challenges – individuals and families confronted with homelessness who also have very low incomes or serious, persistent issues such as substance use disorder, addictions, alcohol use disorder, mental illness, HIV/AIDS, or other serious challenges. A 2021 systematic review of 28 interventions, mostly in North America, showed that interventions with the highest levels of support led to improved outcomes for both housing stability, and health outcomes.

Government initiatives: In South Australia, the state government of Premier Mike Rann (2002–2011) committed substantial funding to a series of initiatives designed to combat homelessness. Advised by Social Inclusion Commissioner David Cappo and the founder of New York's Common Ground program, Rosanne Haggerty, the Rann government established Common Ground Adelaide, building high-quality inner city apartments (combined with intensive support) for "rough sleeping" homeless people. The government also funded the Street to Home program and a hospital liaison service designed to assist homeless people admitted to the emergency departments of Adelaide's major public hospitals. Rather than being released back into homelessness, patients identified as rough sleepers were found accommodation backed by professional support. Common Ground and Street to Home now operate across Australia in other States.

== Assistance and resources ==
Most countries provide a variety of services to assist homeless people. Provisions of food, shelter, and clothing may be organized and run by community organizations, often with the help of volunteers, or by government departments. Assistance programs may be supported by the government, charities, churches, and individual donors. However, not all homeless people can access these resources. In 1998, a study by Koegel and Schoeni of a homeless population in Los Angeles, California, found that a significant minority of homeless did not participate in government assistance programs, with high transaction costs being a likely contributing factor.

=== Social supports ===
While some homeless people are known to have a community with one another, providing each other various types of support, people who are not homeless also may provide them friendship, relational care, and other forms of assistance. Such social support may occur through a formal process, such as under the auspices of a non-governmental organization, religious organization, or homeless ministry, or may be done on an individual basis.

=== Income ===
==== Employment ====
The United States Department of Labor has sought to address one of the main causes of homelessness, a lack of meaningful and sustainable employment, through targeted training programs and increased access to employment opportunities that can help homeless people develop sustainable lifestyles. This has included the development of the United States Interagency Council on Homelessness, which addresses homelessness on the federal level in addition to connecting homeless individuals to resources at the state level. All individuals who are in need of assistance are able, in theory, to access employment and training services under the Workforce Investment Act (WIA), although this is contingent upon funding and program support by the government.

==== Income sources outside of regular employment ====
Homeless people can also use waste management services to earn money. Some homeless people find returnable bottles and cans and bring them to recycling centers to earn money. They can sort out organic trash from other trash or separate out trash made of the same material (for example, different types of plastics, and different types of metal). In addition, rather than picking waste at landfills, they can also collect litter found on/beside the road to earn an income.

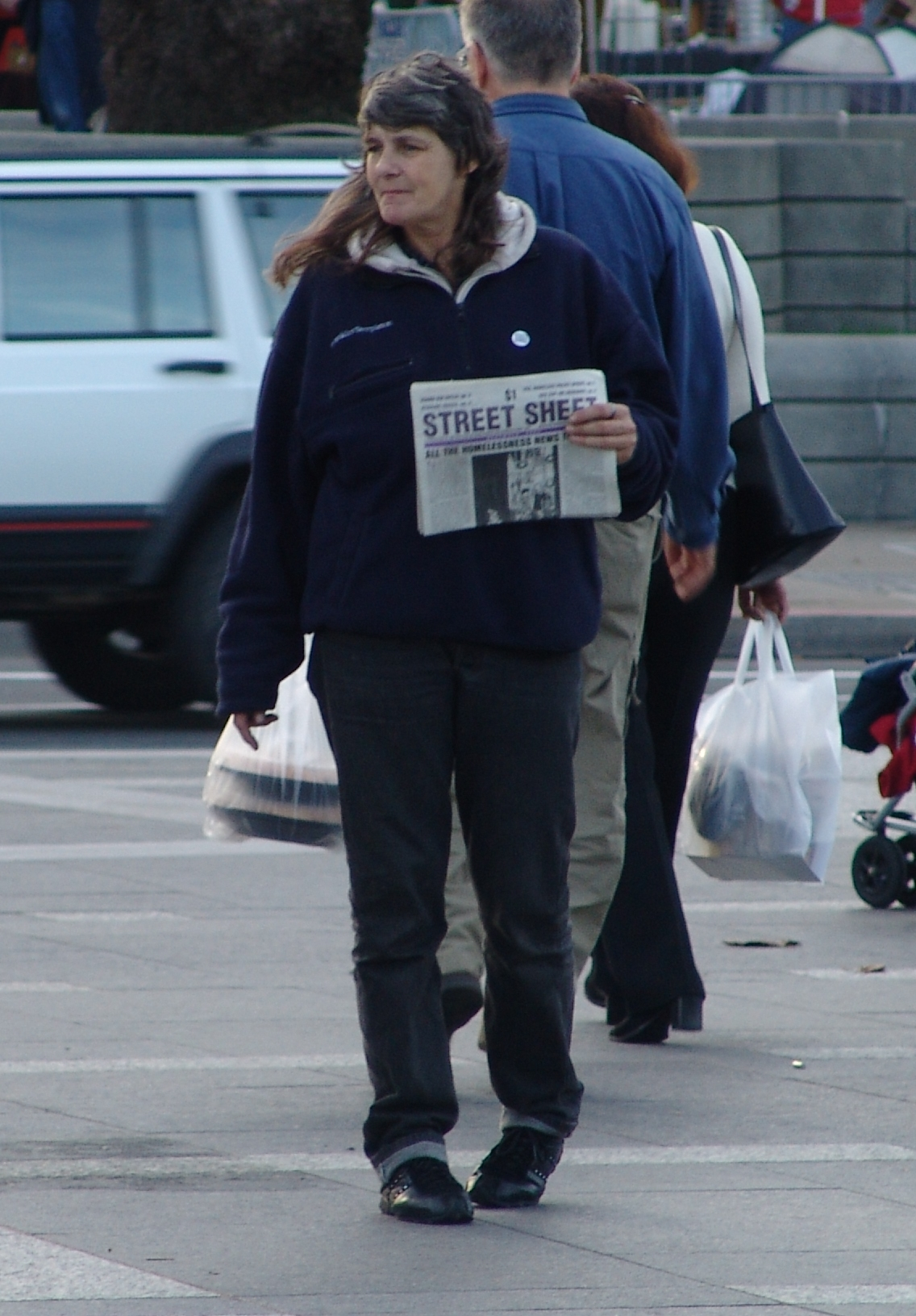
A street newspaper vendor, selling Street Sheet, in San Francisco, United States

Street newspapers are newspapers or magazines sold by homeless or poor individuals and produced mainly to support these populations. Most such newspapers primarily provide coverage of homelessness and poverty-related issues and seek to strengthen social networks within homeless communities, making them a tool for allowing homeless individuals to work.

=== Medicine ===
The 2010 passage of the Patient Protection and Affordable Care Act could provide new healthcare options for homeless people in the United States, particularly through the optional expansion of Medicaid. A 2013 Yale study indicated that a substantial proportion of the chronically homeless population in America would be able to obtain Medicaid coverage if states expanded Medicaid under the Affordable Care Act.

In 1985, the Boston Health Care for the Homeless Program was founded to assist the growing numbers of homeless people living on the streets and in shelters in Boston who were suffering from a lack of effective medical services. In 2004, Boston Health Care for the Homeless in conjunction with the National Health Care for the Homeless Council published a medical manual called The Health Care of Homeless Persons, edited by James J. O'Connell, M.D., specifically for the treatment of the homeless population. In June 2008 in Boston, the Jean Yawkey Place, a four-story, 7,214.2-square-metre (77,653 sq ft) building, was opened by the Boston Health Care for the Homeless Program. It is an entire full-service building on the Boston Medical Center campus dedicated to providing healthcare for homeless people. It also contains a long-term care facility, the Barbara McInnis House, which expanded to 104 beds and is the first and largest medical respite program for homeless people in the United States.

In Los Angeles, a collaboration between the Ostrow School of Dentistry of the University of Southern California and the Union Rescue Mission shelter offers homeless people in the Skid Row area free dental services.

Studies on the effects of intensive mental health interventions have demonstrated some improvements in housing stability and to be economically beneficial on cost-analysis.

=== Housing ===
Permanent supportive housing (PSH) interventions appear to have improvements in housing stability for people living with homelessness even in the long term.

==== Savings from housing homeless in the United States ====
In 2013, a Central Florida Commission on Homelessness study indicated that the region spends $31,000 a year per homeless person to cover "salaries of law enforcement officers to arrest and transport homeless individuals – largely for nonviolent offenses such as trespassing, public intoxication or sleeping in parks – as well as the cost of jail stays, emergency room visits and hospitalization for medical and psychiatric issues. This did not include "money spent by nonprofit agencies to feed, clothe and sometimes shelter these individuals". In contrast, the report estimated the cost of permanent supportive housing at "$10,051 per person per year" and concluded that "[h]ousing even half of the region's chronically homeless population would save taxpayers $149 million over the next decade – even allowing for ten percent to end up back on the streets again." This particular study followed 107 long-term-homeless residents living in Orange, Osceola, and Seminole Counties. Similar studies are showing large financial savings in Charlotte, North Carolina, and southeastern Colorado from focusing on simply housing homeless people.

In general, housing interventions had mixed economic results in cost-analysis studies.

==== Innovative solutions ====
Los Angeles, California conducted a competition promoted by Mayor Eric Garcetti soliciting ideas from developers to use bond money more efficiently in building housing for the city's homeless population. The top five winners were announced on 1 February 2019 and the concepts included using assembly-ready molded polymer panels that can be put together with basic tools, prefabricated 5-story stack-able houses, erecting privately financed modular buildings on properties that do not require City Council approval, using bond money to convert residential garages into small apartments which are then dedicated to homeless rentals, and the redeveloping of Bungalow-court units, the small low-income iconic buildings that housed seven percent of the city's population in the 1920s.

In the neighborhood of Westlake, Los Angeles, the city is funding the first transitionally homeless housing building using "Cargotecture", or "architecture built from repurposed shipping containers." The Hope on Alvarado micro-apartment building will consist of four stories of 84 containers stacked together like Lego bricks on top of a traditionally constructed ground floor. Completion is anticipated by the end of 2019.

=== Political action ===
Voting for elected officials is important for the population of homeless people to have a voice in the democratic process.

There are also many community organizations and social movements around the world which are taking action to reduce homelessness. They have sought to counteract the causes and reduce the consequences by starting initiatives that help homeless people transition to self-sufficiency. Social movements and initiatives tend to follow a grassroots, community-based model of organization – generally characterized by a loose, informal, and decentralized structure, with an emphasis on radical protest politics. By contrast, an interest group aims to influence government policies by relying on more of a formal organizational structure. These groups share a common element: they are both made up of and run by a mix of allies of the homeless population and former or current members of the homeless population. Both grassroots groups and interest groups aim to break stereotyped images of homeless people as being weak and hapless, or defiant criminals and drug addicts, and to ensure that the voice of homeless people and their representatives are heard by policymakers.

==== Organizing in homeless shelters ====
Homeless shelters can become grounds for community organization and the recruitment of homeless individuals into social movements for their cause. Cooperation between the shelter and an elected representative from the homeless community at each shelter can serve as the backbone of this type of initiative. The representative presents and forwards problems raises concerns and provides new ideas to the director and staff of the shelters. Examples of possible problems are ways to deal with substance use disorders by certain shelter users, and the resolution of interpersonal conflicts. SAND, the Danish National Organization for Homeless People, is one example of an organization that uses this empowerment approach. Issues reported at the homeless shelters are then addressed by SAND at the regional or national level. To open further dialogue, SAND organizes regional discussion forums where staff and leaders from the shelters, homeless representatives, and local authorities meet to discuss issues and good practices at the shelters.

=== Veteran specific ===
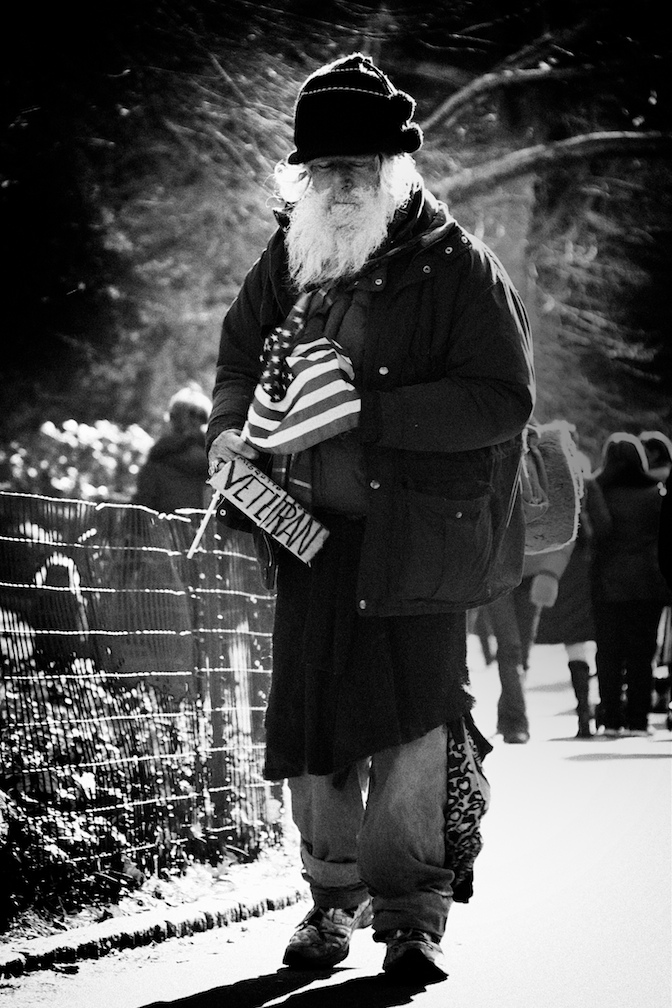
Homeless veteran man in New York City

Many homeless organizations support homeless veterans, an issue most commonly seen in the United States.

Non-governmental organizations house or redirect homeless veterans to care facilities. Social Security Income/Social Security Disability Income, Access, Outreach, Recovery Program (SOAR) is a national project funded by the Substance Abuse and Mental Health Services Administration. It is designed to increase access to SSI/SSDI for eligible adults who are homeless or at risk of becoming homeless and have a mental illness or a co-occurring substance use disorder. Using a three-pronged approach of Strategic Planning, Training, and Technical Assistance (TA), the SOAR TA Center coordinates this effort at the state and community level.

The United States Department of Housing and Urban Development and Veterans Administration have a special Section 8 housing voucher program called VASH (Veterans Administration Supported Housing), or HUD-VASH, which gives out a certain number of Section 8 subsidized housing vouchers to eligible homeless and otherwise vulnerable US armed forces veterans. The HUD-VASH program has shown success in housing many homeless veterans. The support available to homeless veterans varies internationally, however. For example, in England, where there is a national right to housing, veterans are only prioritized by local authority homelessness teams if they are found to be vulnerable due to having served in the Armed Forces.

Under the Department of Labor, the Veterans' Employment and Training Service (VETS) offers a variety of programs targeted at ending homelessness among veterans. The Homeless Veterans Reintegration Program (HVRP) is the only national program that is exclusively focused on assisting veterans as they reenter the workforce. The VETS program also has an Incarcerated Veterans' Transition Program, as well as services that are unique to female Veterans. Mainstream programs initiated by the Department of Labor have included the Workforce Investment Act, One-Stop Career Centers, and a Community Voice Mail system that helps to connect homeless individuals around the United States with local resources. Targeted labor programs have included the Homeless Veterans Reintegration Project, the Disability Program Navigator Initiative, efforts to end chronic homelessness through providing employment and housing projects, Job Corps, and the Veterans Workforce Investment Program (VWIP).

== In popular culture ==
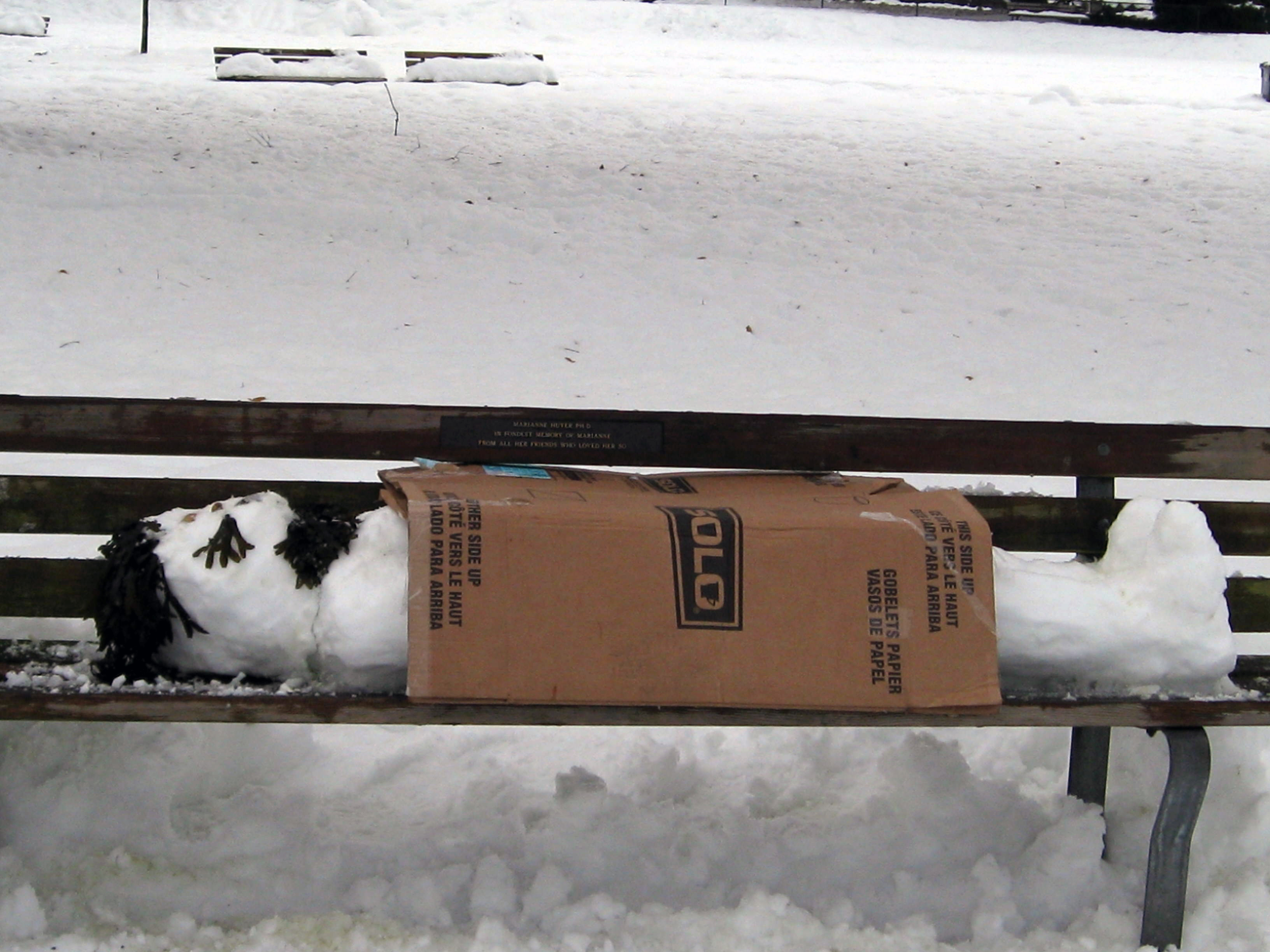
A street bench in Kitsilano, British Columbia, Canada, with a snowman depicting a homeless person

Homelessness has frequently been described as an invisible problem, despite its prevalence. Writers and other artists play a role in bringing the issue to public attention. Homelessness is the central theme of many works; in other works homelessness is secondary, added to advance the story or contribute to dramatic effect. Homelessness is the central subject in most of the works of art listed here.

=== Films ===
- On the Nickel (1980), a drama in which a recovering alcoholic, who feels dissatisfied with his life of sobriety, goes back in search of the good times he enjoyed with his old friends living on Los Angeles' skid row.
- Stone Pillow (1985), a made-for-television drama film starring Lucille Ball as Flora, a streetwise "bag lady" who mentors a young girl whom she believes has recently become homeless herself; unbeknownst to Flora, the young woman is secretly carrying out an immersive personal investigation into the lives of the homeless, in an effort to be a part of the solution.
- Ironweed (1987), an adaptation of the novel, concerning the relationship of a homeless couple during the years following the Great Depression in Albany, New York.
- God Bless the Child (1988), a made-for-TV movie about a single mother living on the streets of New York City with her young daughter.
- The Saint of Fort Washington (1993), a drama where a homeless disabled man gets guidance from a friendly veteran as they cope with the realities of living on the streets.
- Homeless to Harvard: The Liz Murray Story (2003), a film about a homeless girl, Liz Murray, who works her way up to admission to Harvard University.
- Tokyo Godfathers (2003), an anime comedy-drama where three homeless people from varied backgrounds living in Tokyo adopt an abandoned baby to search for her mother.
- The Pursuit of Happyness (2006), a biographical film where a father and son get a job and end up homeless after eviction and later tax garnishment. After a week living from place to place in 1981 San Francisco, he lands a permanent position in a brokerage firm after completing an unpaid internship.

=== Documentaries ===
- 1978. The Agony of Jimmy Quinlan, a National Film Board documentary about homeless alcoholics in Montreal (video online in full).
- 1984. Streetwise, follows homeless Seattle youth.
- 1993. It Was a Wonderful Life, chronicles the lives of six articulate, educated, hidden homeless women as they struggle from day to day; narrated by Jodie Foster.
- 1997. The Street: A Film with the Homeless, about the Canadian homeless in Montreal.
- 2000. Dark Days, a documentary by Marc Singer, who followed the lives of people living in the Freedom Tunnel, an Amtrak tunnel in New York City.
- 2001. Children Underground, Following the lives of homeless children in Bucharest, Romania.
- 2003. À Margem da Imagem, about the homeless in São Paulo, Brazil. Its English title is "On the Fringes of São Paulo: Homeless".
- 2004. Homeless in America, documentary by Tommy Wiseau.
- 2005. The Children of Leningradsky, about homeless children in Moscow.
- 2008. The Oasis, an observational documentary about homeless youths in Sydney, Australia, filmed over two years.
- 2008. Carts of Darkness, a documentary by Murray Siple about extreme shopping cart racing by homeless men.
- 2011. 66 Months, a British documentary film about a homeless man who makes it on his own for six years without any government programs helping him.

=== Music ===
- 1987. Day-In Day-Out, song by David Bowie. It was written about the treatment of the homeless in the US, and the video was shot in Los Angeles, was nominated for a1987 MTV Video Music award in the category of "Best Male Video".
- 2007. Give US Your Poor, benefit album raising awareness of homelessness. It has 17 recordings with artists such as Jon Bon Jovi, Natalie Merchant, Pete Seeger, Bruce Springsteen, Sonya Kitchell, Bonnie Raitt, and actors Danny Glover and Tim Robbins.

=== Literature & theater ===
- 1902. The Lower Depths, a play by Maxim Gorky, inspired by the residents of a Nizhny Novgorod homeless shelter.
- 1905. The Cop and the Anthem, short story by O. Henry.
- 1907. Tramping with Tramps, book by Josiah Flynt.
- 1933. Down and Out in Paris and London, book by George Orwell.
- 1977. Underneath the Arches, a documentary produced by Owen Spencer-Thomas on BBC Radio London in which London's homeless people were enabled to tell their own stories.
- 1983. Ironweed, book by William Kennedy.
- 1993. Stone Cold, book by Robert Swindells.
- 2005. Without a Net: Middle Class and Homeless (With Kids) in America, memoir by Michelle Kennedy.

=== Visual arts ===
- 2013. Homeless Jesus, a bronze sculpture by Canadian sculptor Timothy Schmalz depicting Jesus as a homeless person sleeping on a park bench, which since 2013 has been installed in many places across the world.

== See also ==
- Ghost town repopulation – Abandoned settlement with intact features
- Grave dwellers – Subgroup of homeless people particular to Iran
- Hunter-gatherers – Peoples who forage or hunt for most or all of their food
- Internally displaced person – Person forced to leave their home who remains within their country
- Nomads – Person without fixed habitat
- Right to housing – Economic, social and cultural right
