= List of Iranian actresses =

The following is a list of Iranian actresses in alphabetical order.

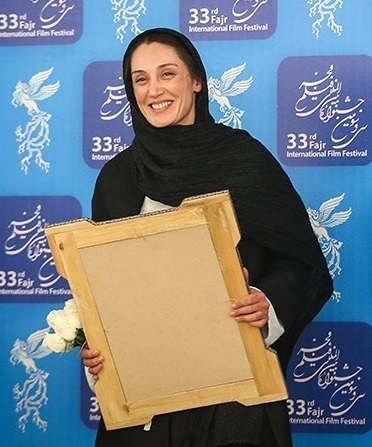
Hedieh Tehrani

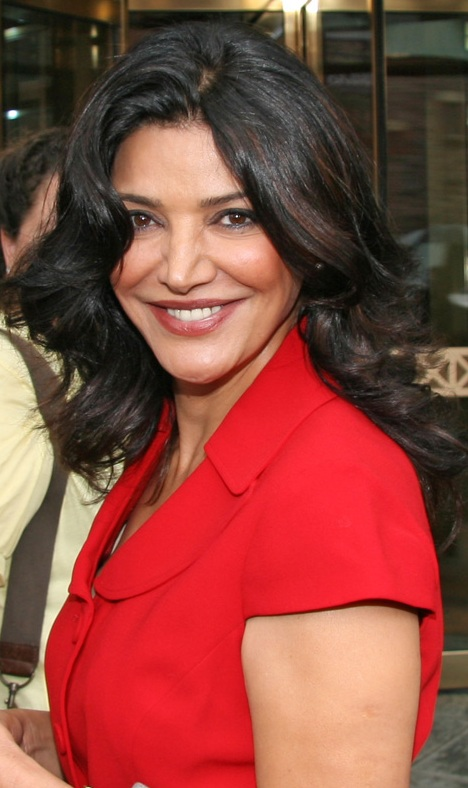
Shohreh Aghdashloo

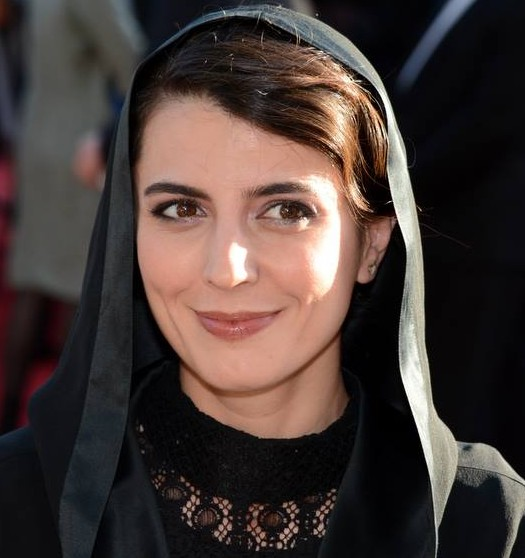
Leila Hatami

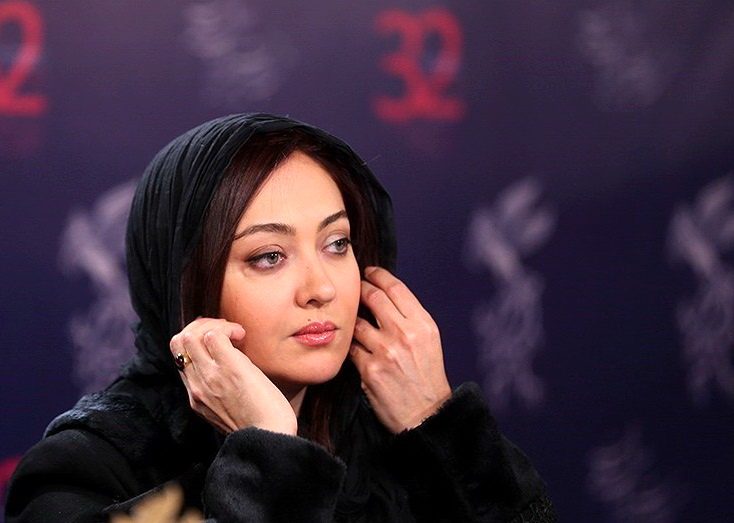
Niki Karimi

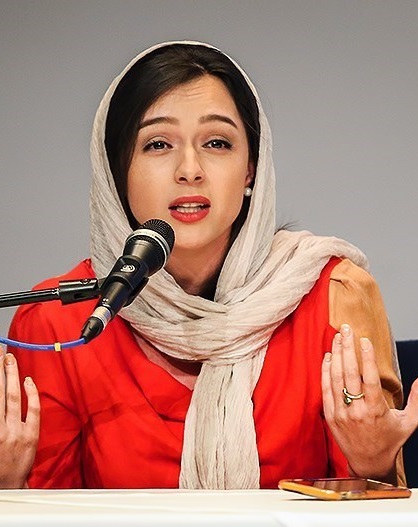
Taraneh Alidoosti

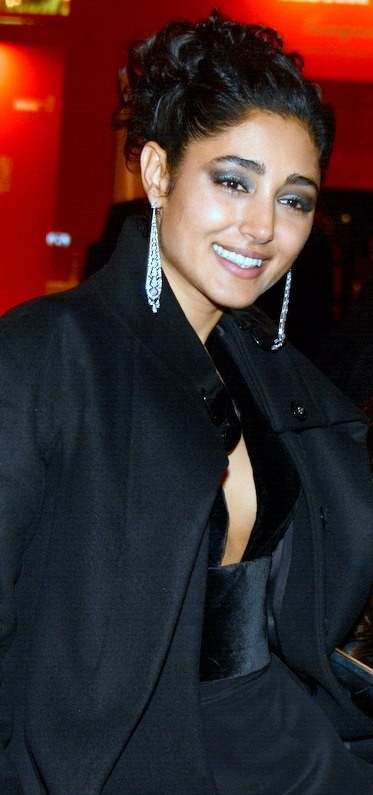
Golshifteh Farahani

== A ==
- Aram
- Bahareh Afshari
- Golab Adineh
- Anahita Afshar
- Mahnaz Afshar
- Shohreh Aghdashloo
- Pegah Ahangarani
- Pardis Ahmadieh
- Taraneh Alidoosti
- Zar Amir Ebrahimi
- Mary Apick
- Afsar Asadi
- Vishka Asayesh
- Sadaf Asgari
- Tala Ashe
- Rana Azadivar
- Nasim Adabi
- Khatereh Asadi
- Elika Abdolrazzaghi

== B ==
- Asal Badiee
- Nazanin Bayati
- Pantea Bahram
- Maral Baniadam
- Behnoosh Bakhtyari
- Pouri Banayi
- Afsaneh Bayegan
- Soudabeh Beizaee
- Shiva Boloorian
- Nazanin Boniadi
- Nikohl Boosheri
- Anna Borkowska
- Sareh Bayat
- Sara Bahrami

== D ==
- Shaghayegh Dehghan
- Sahar Dolatshahi
- Anahita Dargahi

== E ==
- Setare Eskandari

== F ==
- Ateneh Faghih Nasiri
- Golshifteh Farahani
- Shaghayegh Farahani
- Lily Farhadpour
- Farimah Farjami
- Bita Farrahi
- Shamsi Fazlollahi
- Hadis Fooladvand
- Negar Foroozandeh
- Jewell Farshad
- Leila Forouhar

== G ==
- Vida Ghahremani
- Soraya Ghasemi
- Sahar Goldoost
- Shabnam Gholikhani
- Parastoo Golestani
- Googoosh
- Shabnam Ghorbani
- Sahar Ghoreyshi
- Fatemeh Gudarzi
- Hengame Ghaziani
- Soraya Ghasemi

== H ==
- Azita Hajian
- Mitra Hajjar
- Elham Hamidi
- Fatemeh Hashemi
- Leila Hatami
- Sara Hatami
- Mahsa Hejazi
- Anahita Hemmati
- Elahe Hesari
- Fereshteh Hosseini
- Farrokhlagha Houshmand

== I ==
- Parinaz Izadyar

== J ==
- Behnaz Jafari
- Maryam Amir Jalali
- Negar Javaherian
- Neda Jebraeili
- Fereshteh Jenabi
- Falamak Joneidi
- Mandana Jones

== K ==
- Saba Kamali
- Niki Karimi
- Mina Kavani
- Mahtab Keramati
- Anahita Khalatbari
- Sheida Khaligh
- Sogol Khaligh
- Hamideh Kheirabadi
- Gohar Kheirandish
- Shila Khodadad
- Sara Khoeniha
- Negin Kianfar
- Baran Kosari

== L ==
Samiyeh Lak

== M ==
- Setareh Maleki
- Laleh Marzban
- Hengameh Mofid
- Shabnam Moghaddamy
- Akram Mohammadi
- Aida Mohammadkhani
- Zohreh Mojabi
- Ladan Mostofi
- Fatemeh Motamed-Arya
- Roya Mirelmi

== N ==
- Fariba Naderi
- Yekta Naser
- Azade Namdari
- Ana Nemati
- Roya Nonahali
- Nooshafarin

== O ==
- Leila Otadi

== P ==
- Maryam Palizban
- Pantea Panahiha
- Setareh Pesyani
- Mahaya Petrosian
- Pardis Pourabedini
- Laleh Pourkarim

== R ==
- Bahare Rahnama
- Leili Rashidi
- Fahimeh Rastkar
- Atefeh Razavi
- Katayoun Riahi
- Shahla Riahi
- Shiva Rose
- Homa Rousta

== S ==
- Mina Sadati
- Golchehreh Sajadiye
- Azadeh Samadi
- Zhaleh Sameti
- Roohangiz Saminejad
- Mahtab Servati
- Annik Shefrazian
- Sarah Shahi
- Elnaz Shakerdoust
- Ghazal Shakeri
- Mehraveh Sharifinia
- Jamileh Sheykhi
- Parvin Soleimani
- Parvaneh Soltani
- Bahar Soomekh
- Jamile Sheykhi

== T ==
- Behnoosh Tabatabaei
- Jasmin Tabatabai
- Sadaf Taherian
- Farzaneh Taidi
- Susan Taslimi
- Hanieh Tavassoli
- Hedyeh Tehrani
- Roya Teymourian
- Shabnam Tolouei

== V ==
- Sahar Valadbeigi
- Marzieh Vafamehr

== Z ==
- Sahar Zakaria
- Laya Zanganeh
- Merila Zarei
- Irene Zazians
- Newsha Zeighami
- Hoda Zeinolabedin
- Leyla Zareh
