= Amir Tataloo discography =

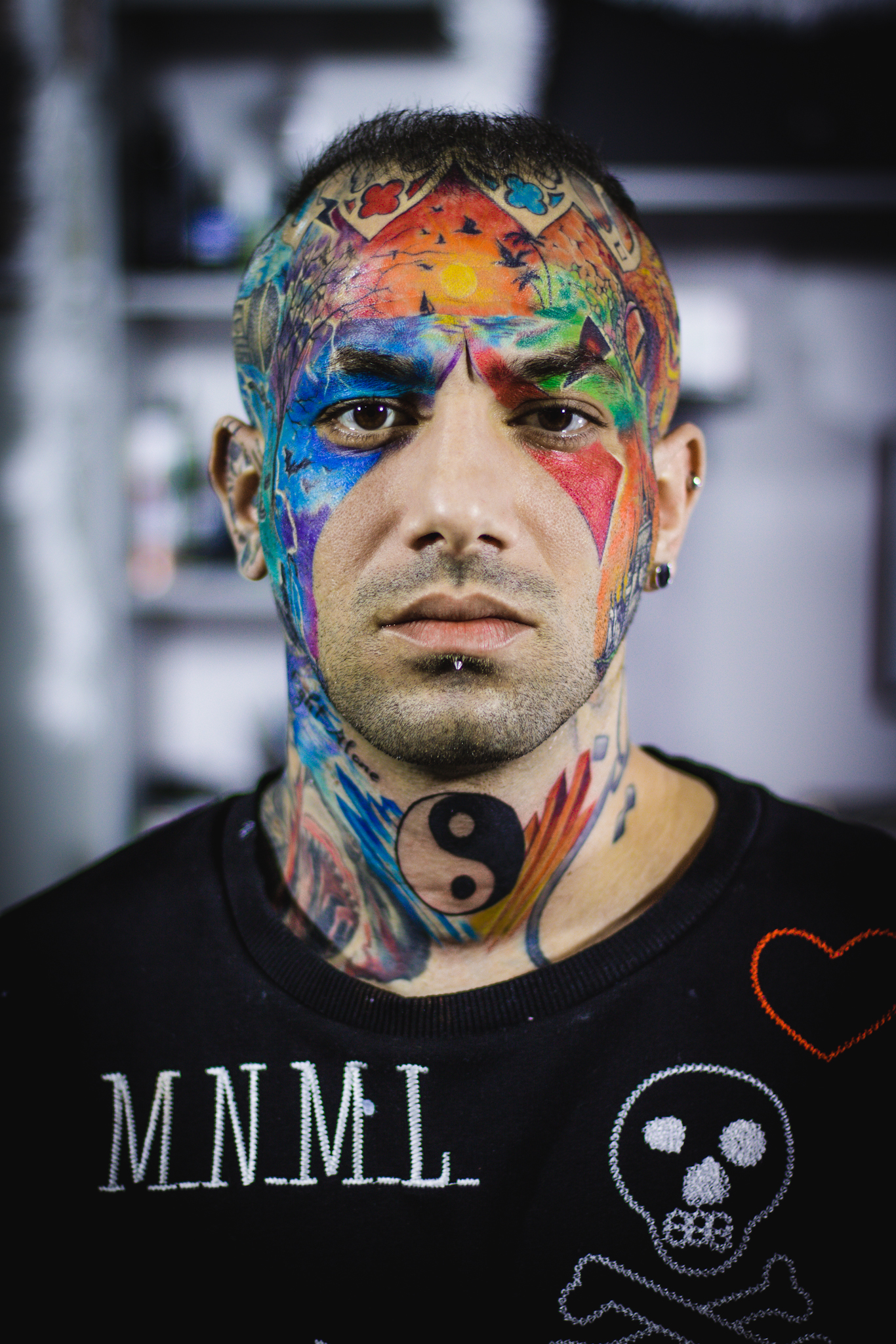
- Studio albums: 20
- Live albums: 1
- Singles: 126
- Music videos: 50

The discography of Amir Tataloo, a singer and songwriter. So far, he has released 19 studio albums, 1 live album, 50 music videos and 126 official singles. He started his professional activity in 2005.

== Studio albums ==
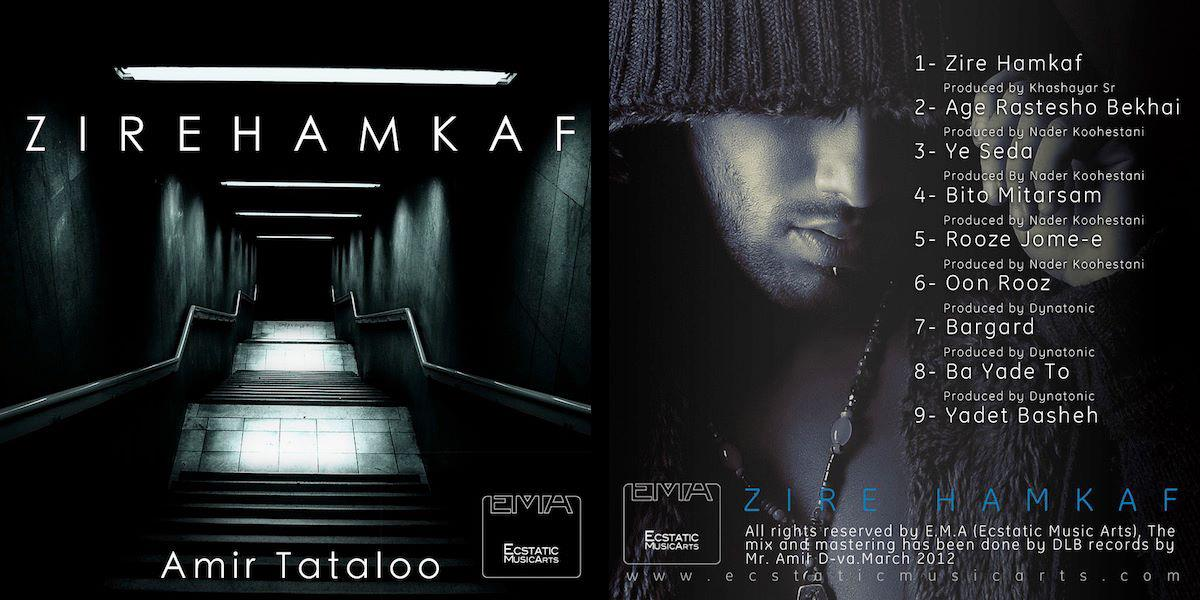
Zire Hamkaf (2012)
| # | Persian Title | Featuring Artists | Producer | Time |
|---|---|---|---|---|
| 1 | Zire Hamkaf | - | Khashayar SR | 3:14 |
| 2 | Age Rastesho Bekhai | - | Nader Koohestani | 3:24 |
| 3 | Ye Seda | - | Nader Koohestani | 3:27 |
| 4 | Bito Mitarsam | - | Nader Koohestani | 3:34 |
| 5 | Rooze Jome-e | - | Nader Koohestani | 4:15 |
| 6 | Oon Rooz | - | Pooya Dynatonic | 4:04 |
| 7 | Bargard | - | Pooya Dynatonic | 2:53 |
| 8 | Ba Yade To | - | Pooya Dynatonic | 3:29 |
| 9 | Yadet Basheh | - | Nader Koohestani | 3:19 |

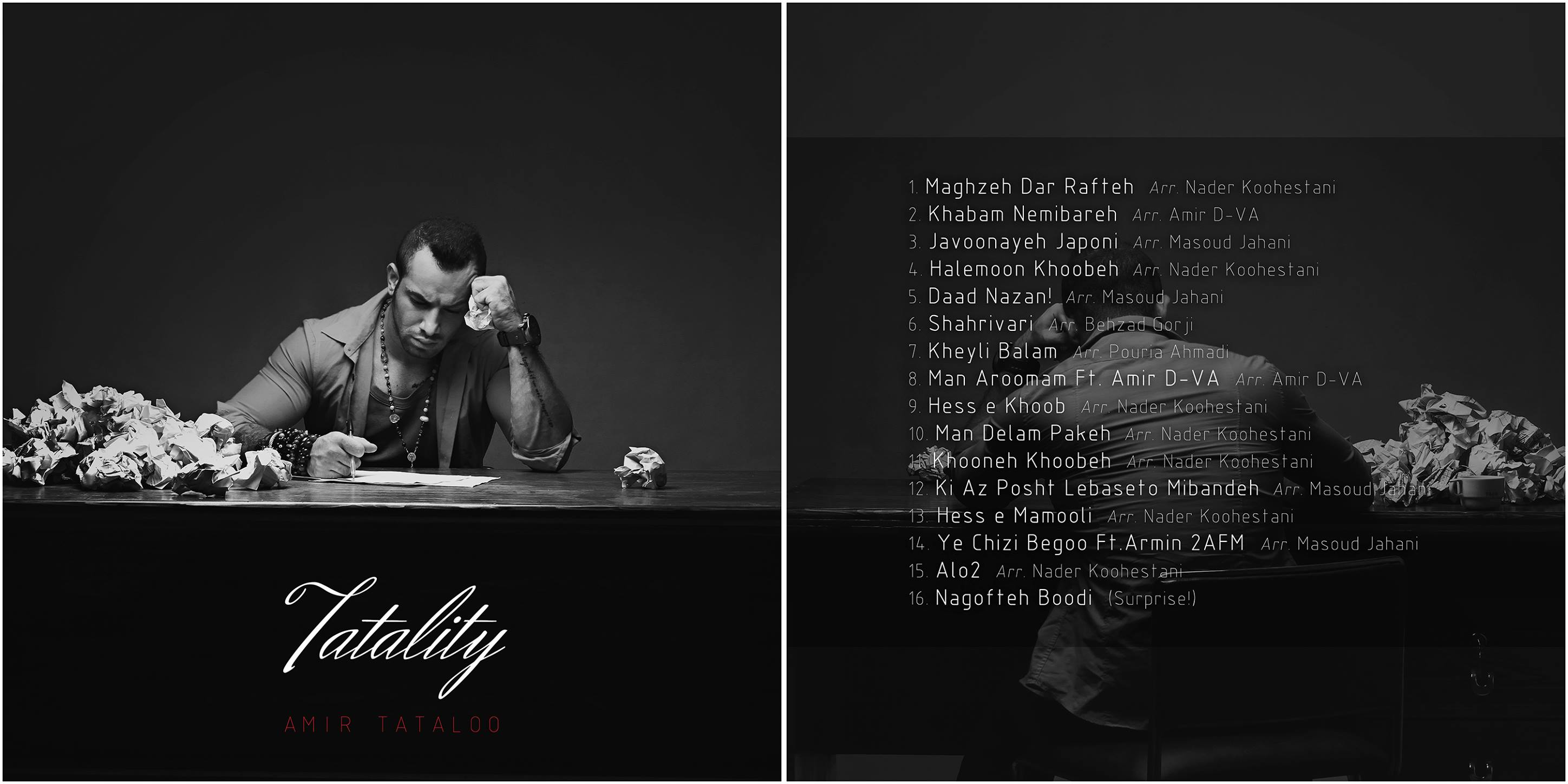
Tatality (2013)
| # | Persian Title | Featuring Artists | Producer | Time |
|---|---|---|---|---|
| 1 | Maghzeh Dar Rafteh | - | Nader Koohestani | 4:50 |
| 2 | Khabam Nemibareh | - | Amir D-VA | 3:47 |
| 3 | Javoonayeh Japoni | - | Masoud Jahani | 3:08 |
| 4 | Halemoon Khoobeh | - | Nader Koohestani | 4:03 |
| 5 | Daad Nazan ! | - | Masoud Jahani | 3:55 |
| 6 | Shahrivari | - | Behzad Gorji | 3:33 |
| 7 | Kheyli Balam | - | Pouria Ahmadi | 3:55 |
| 8 | Man Aroomam | Amir D-VA | Amir D-VA | 4:31 |
| 9 | Hess e Khoob | - | Nader Koohestani | 3:15 |
| 10 | Man Delam Pakeh | - | Nader Koohestani | 3:41 |
| 11 | Khooneh Khoobeh | - | Nader Koohestani | 5:01 |
| 12 | Ki Az Posht Lebaseto Mibandeh | - | Masoud Jahani | 4:11 |
| 13 | Hess e Mamooli | - | Nader Koohestani | 3:40 |
| 14 | Ye Chizi Begoo | Armin 2afm | Masoud Jahani | 3:58 |
| 15 | Alo 2 | - | Nader Koohestani | 3:35 |
| 16 | Nagofteh Boodi | - | Nader Koohestani | 3:39 |

Man (2014)
| # | Persian Title | Featuring Artists | Producer | Time |
|---|---|---|---|---|
| 1 | Mard | - | Nader Koohestani | 4:30 |
| 2 | Zamin Male Ma Nist | - | Nader Koohestani | 3:56 |
| 3 | Az Shabe Aval | - | Amir D-VA | 3:17 |
| 4 | Etminan | - | Amir D-VA | 3:44 |
| 5 | Karikator | - | Amir D-VA | 3:38 |
| 6 | Oon Alan Halesh Khoobe | - | Amir D-VA | 3:11 |
| 7 | To Too Dide Man Nisti | - | Nader Koohestani | 3:38 |
| 8 | Ma Beham Bimar Boodim | - | Nader Koohestani | 3:21 |
| 9 | Tamoom Shod | - | Nader Koohestani | 3:29 |
| 10 | Vase To Hamishe Mikhandidam | - | Nader Koohestani | 3:49 |
| 11 | Man | - | Nader Koohestani | 4:37 |
| 12 | Ye Khahesh | - | Nader Koohestani | 4:01 |
| 13 | Nemitooni Messe Man Bashi | - | Nader Koohestani | 3:30 |
| 14 | Ba To | - | Nader Koohestani | 3:30 |
| 15 | Bezar Too Hale Khodam Basham | - | Nader Koohestani | 4:02 |
| 16 | Merci | - | Nader Koohestani | 4:32 |

Shomare 6 (2015)
| # | Persian Title | Featuring Artists | Producer | Time |
|---|---|---|---|---|
| 1 | Taadol | - | Nader Koohestani & Amir D-VA | 4:37 |
| 2 | Bade Zemestoon | - | Nader Koohestani | 3:22 |
| 3 | Hessesh Kon | - | Amir D-VA | 3:29 |
| 4 | Zendegi Koo | - | Nader Koohestani | 3:14 |
| 5 | Joft 6 | - | Nader Koohestani | 3:46 |
| 6 | Asoode Bekhab | - | Nader Koohestani | 3:35 |
| 7 | Faze Khoone | - | Amir D-VA | 4:02 |
| 8 | Ooni Ke Fekre Fardashe | - | Amir D-VA | 3:52 |
| 9 | Taadol (Guitar Version) - Release 2016 | - | Amir D-VA | 3:53 |

Mamnoo (2015)
| # | Persian Title | Featuring Artists | Producer | Time |
|---|---|---|---|---|
| 1 | Mamane To | - | Nader Koohestani | 3:36 |
| 2 | Dooset Nadaram | - | Amir D-VA | 3:48 |
| 3 | To Nemifahmi | - | Amir D-VA | 4:08 |
| 4 | Mamnoo | - | Nader Koohestani | 3:46 |
| 5 | Too Koocheye Ma Ham Aroosi Mishe | - | Nader Koohestani | 3:40 |
| 6 | Age Halit Bood | - | Amir Tataloo | 4:10 |
| 7 | Be Man Che Han ? | - | Masoud Jahani | 3:42 |

Shomare 7 (2016)
| # | Persian Title | Featuring Artists | Producer | Time |
|---|---|---|---|---|
| 1 | To Hameja Boodi | - | Amir D-VA | 4:15 |
| 2 | Baghalam Kon | - | Amir D-VA | 4:16 |
| 3 | Donya | - | Masoud Jahani | 4:24 |
| 4 | Dari Be Chi Fekr Mikoni | - | Masoud Jahani | 3:28 |
| 5 | Alkol Inja Mamnooe | - | Masoud Jahani | 3:41 |
| 6 | Senario | - | Pooya Dynatonic | 4:18 |
| 7 | Moshkele Man Nist | - | Amir D-VA | 3:45 |
| 8 | Kargardan | - | Amir D-VA | 3:51 |
| 9 | Mage Mishe | - | Amir D-VA | 3:51 |

Gahreman (2017)
| # | Persian Title | Featuring Artists | Producer | Time |
|---|---|---|---|---|
| 1 | Ghahreman | - | Amir D-VA | 5:12 |
| 2 | Pantomime | Hossein Duzakh | Amir D-VA | 4:25 |
| 3 | Navazesh | - | Masoud Jahani | 4:03 |
| 4 | Etiyad | - | Amir D-VA | 3:48 |
| 5 | Timar | - | Masoud Jahani | 3:58 |
| 6 | Chera | Reza Pishro | Amir D-VA | 4:13 |
| 7 | Tah Sigar o Masghati | - | Amir D-VA | 4:53 |
| 8 | Be Eshghe Khodet | Hossein Duzakh | Hosein Duzakh | 3:43 |
| 9 | Gir Kardam Roo To | - | Masoud Jahani | 4:02 |
| 10 | Taghir | - | Amir D-VA | 3:50 |
| 11 | Eyde Emsal | - | Amir D-VA | 4:30 |
| 12 | Pile | - | Amir D-VA | 3:20 |
| 13 | Mesle Shir | - | Masoud Jahani | 4:42 |
| 14 | Iran | - | Amir D-VA | 4:05 |
| 15 | Rooz Be Rooz | - | Nader Koohestani | 3:30 |
| 16 | Boro Mercy | - | Pooya Dynatonic | 3:53 |

Amir (2017)
| # | Persian Title | Featuring Artists | Producer | Time |
|---|---|---|---|---|
| 1 | Kooze | - | Nader Koohestani | 4:43 |
| 2 | Mano Davat Karde Mehmoonishoon | - | Amir D-VA | 4:05 |
| 3 | In Niz Bogzarad | - | Nader Koohestani | 3:50 |
| 4 | Manam Ba Nadarim | - | Nader Koohestani | 3:41 |
| 5 | Cheshm Cheshm Do Abroo | - | Amir D-VA | 4:31 |
| 6 | Khoreshte Gardan | Hosein Duzakh | Hosein Duzakh | 3:50 |
| 7 | Free Delivery | - | Nader Koohestani | 3:08 |
| 8 | Ye Kari Kon Nisham Vashe | Hosein Duzakh | Hosein Duzakh | 3:31 |
| 9 | Too Rah | Hosein Duzakh | Hosein Duzakh | 3:58 |

Sayeh (2018)
| # | Persian Title | Featuring Artists | Producer | Time |
|---|---|---|---|---|
| 1 | Az Panjere Bebin Biroono | - | Nader Koohestani | 4:10 |
| 2 | Rafttanet | - | Amir D-VA | 4:08 |
| 3 | Beres | - | Nader Koohestani | 4:07 |
| 4 | Goolehaye Barf | - | Nader Koohestani | 3:37 |
| 5 | Harki Be Ma Resid | Hosein Duzakh | Hosein Duzakh | 4:16 |
| 6 | Man Az In Eshgh | - | Amir D-VA | 3:46 |
| 7 | Bi Risheha | Amir D-VA | Amir D-VA | 4:20 |
| 8 | Sayeh | - | Amir D-VA | 4:38 |
| 9 | Farghi Nadare | - | Amir D-VA | 4:25 |

Jahanam (2019)
| # | Persian Title | Featuring Artists | Producer | Time |
|---|---|---|---|---|
| 1 | Beshmar | - | Amir D-VA | 4:25 |
| 2 | He | - | Mehdi Moazam | 5:04 |
| 3 | Dele Divoone | - | Mehdi Moazam | 4:20 |
| 4 | Sadi Chand | - | Mehdi Moazam | 5:29 |
| 5 | Sahebe Ghalbam Bash | - | Mehdi Moazam | 3:41 |
| 6 | Miram | Merzhak | Pedram Azad | 4:33 |
| 7 | Mehmooni | - | Saeed Ansar | 4:32 |
| 8 | Shabe Tire | - | Hasan Baba | 6:13 |
| 9 | Jahanam | - | Ahmad Solo | 7:37 |
| 10 | Bachehaye Kar | - | Ahmad Solo | 5:46 |
| 11 | Maskhare Bazi | - | Hasan Baba | 5:53 |
| 12 | Man 2 | - | Hasan Baba | 14:35 |
| 13 | Dele Man Havato Karde | - | Saeed Ansar | 6:35 |
| 14 | Shab Ke Mishe | - | Hasan Baba | 5:47 |
| 15 | Shabe Yalda | Dejavu Band | Mehdi Moazam | 6:43 |
| 16 | Ghilivili | - | Mearaj Tabasi | 10:28 |

Barzakh (2019)
| # | Persian Title | Featuring Artists | Producer | Time |
|---|---|---|---|---|
| 1 | Barzakh | - | Ahmad Solo | 10:20 |
| 2 | Hanoozam | Dejavu Band | Ali Zare | 8:42 |
| 3 | Treadmill | - | Mearaj Tabasi | 5:16 |
| 4 | Navazesh 2 | - | Mehdi Moazam | 5:43 |
| 5 | Nang Be Neyrange To | - | Hasan Baba | 5:08 |
| 6 | Mimiri Ko3 Nagi ? | - | Mearaj Tabasi | 7:01 |
| 7 | Begoo Key ?! | - | Ahmad Solo | 5:55 |
| 8 | Delam Mikhad | - | Saeed Ansar | 7:05 |
| 9 | Dobare Lash | - | Lenzas | 5:20 |
| 10 | Harvaght Ke Boodi | - | Hasan Baba | 7:35 |
| 11 | Khaar | - | Hasan Baba | 7:05 |
| 12 | Ajab...!! | - | Mehdi Moazam | 8:33 |
| 13 | Fargh Daram Az Dam Ba Ina | - | Soheil Khodabandeh | 8:09 |
| 14 | Tanasokh | - | Mearaj Tabasi | 8:09 |
| 15 | Bi Manam Mishe | - | Ahmad Solo | 8:08 |
| 16 | Ki Fekresho Mikard | - | Mehdi Moazam | 6:06 |

78 (2020)
| # | Persian Title | Featuring Artists | Producer | Time |
|---|---|---|---|---|
| 1 | Parishab | - | Hasan Baba | 7:07 |
| 2 | Khalse | - | Soheil Khodabandeh | 8:07 |
| 3 | Taziyane | - | Saeed Ansar | 7:24 |
| 4 | Ghasam | - | Mearaj Tabasi | 10:00 |
| 5 | Mamehaye Golshifteh | - | Ahmad Solo | 6:06 |
| 6 | Gorg 2 | - | Saeed Ansar | 8:30 |
| 7 | Ki Mesle To | - | Soheil Khodabandeh | 6:29 |
| 8 | Velesh Kon | - | Mearaj Tabasi | 8:48 |
| 9 | Bezanam Naft Dar Biad | - | Hasan Baba | 6:48 |
| 10 | Jome Ha | - | - | 7:52 |
| 11 | Gardane Man Nandaz | - | Saeed Ansar | 8:56 |
| 12 | Darvaghe | - | Mearaj Tabasi | 9:09 |
| 13 | Haramsara | - | - | 12:01 |
| 14 | Khayeye Bagher | - | Mearaj Tabasi | 5:55 |
| 15 | Male Man Bash | Sohrab MJ, Orchid | Saeed Ansar | 10:19 |
| 16 | Man 3 | - | Mearaj Tabasi | 20:10 |
| 17 | Man Be Kam Razi Nistam | - | Mearaj Tabasi | 10:20 |
| 18 | Afee | - | Mearaj Tabasi | 13:31 |
| 19 | Shab 2 | - | Mearaj Tabasi | 8:08 |
| 20 | Mr. Lodeh | Sohrab MJ, Sepehr Khalse | Hasan Baba | 9:09 |
| 21 | Ehteram | - | Saeed Ansar | 9:00 |
| 22 | Ki Mesle Man | Hosein Duzakh | Mehdi Moazam | 8:08 |
| 23 | Oon Dige Nemitoone | - | Mearaj Tabasi | 10:20 |
| 24 | Khanoome Vaziri | - | Mearaj Tabasi | 7:27 |
| 25 | Amir Tataloo | - | Mearaj Tabasi | 7:09 |

Sheytan (2021)
| # | Persian Title | Featuring Artists | Producer | Time |
|---|---|---|---|---|
| 1 | Ajab 2 | - | Hasan Baba | 8:17 |
| 2 | Ye Saram Be Ma Bezan | - | Hasan Baba | 10:33 |
| 3 | Ba To 2 | - | Mearaj Tabasi | 7:48 |
| 4 | Bezar Too Hale Khodam Basham 2 | - | Saeed Ansar | 6:24 |
| 5 | Allah | - | Mearaj Tabasi | 5:55 |
| 6 | Dele Man Havato Karde 2 | - | Saeed Ansar | 7:07 |
| 8 | Man Bahat Ghahram | - | Mehdi Moazam | 7:08 |
| 7 | Mikham | - | Hasan Baba | 10:19 |
| 9 | Man Avali Naboodam Vali Akharisham - Release 2022 | - | Hasan Baba | 6:39 |

Fereshte (2021)
| # | Persian Title | Featuring Artists | Producer | Time |
|---|---|---|---|---|
| 1 | To Bezar Boro Mano | - | Amir D-VA | 4:31 |
| 2 | Man Yadet Naram | - | Lenzas | 4:43 |
| 3 | Heyf Didid Raft ! | - | Paix | 5:27 |
| 4 | To Ke Bekhay Mitooni | - | Ahmad Solo | 5:24 |
| 5 | Mano Bebakhsh | - | Saeed Ansar | 5:49 |
| 6 | Dobare Lash (New Version) | - | Lenzas | 8:05 |
| 7 | Didi !? | - | Amir D-VA | 5:12 |
| 8 | Fargh Daram Az Dam Ba Ina 2 | - | Soheil Khodabandeh | 5:50 |
| 9 | Gedaei | - | Niavash | 7:39 |
| 10 | Nagoo Na | - | Soheil Khodabandeh | 5:30 |
| 11 | Nesfe Shab | - | Hasan Baba | 5:53 |
| 12 | Dorost ! | - | Niavash | 7:35 |

Sahm (2022)
| # | Persian Title | Featuring Artists | Producer | Time |
|---|---|---|---|---|
| 1 | Sahm | - | Amir D-VA | 4:30 |
| 2 | Jang Setiz | - | Hasan Baba | 4:30 |
| 3 | Gham Gerefte Hame Kooche Haye Maro | - | Mehdi Moazam | 7:26 |
| 4 | Entezar | - | Amir D-VA | 7:20 |
| 5 | Parvaz | - | Niavash | 6:32 |
| 6 | Khooneye Amn | - | Ahmad Solo | 7:16 |
| 7 | Toam Fereshteh Am Naboodi | - | Soheil Khodabandeh | 6:15 |
| 8 | Harki Be Ma Resid 2 | - | Hasan Baba | 6:32 |
| 9 | Ghafas | - | Hasan Baba | 6:58 |

Boht (2022)
| # | Persian Title | Featuring Artists | Producer | Time |
|---|---|---|---|---|
| 1 | Boht | - | Amir D-VA | 7:20 |
| 2 | Hagh | - | Hasan Baba | 7:11 |
| 3 | Sheytan | - | Lenzas | 7:37 |
| 4 | Behesht | - | Hasan Baba | 6:24 |
| 5 | Ye Dafe Dige Mikham | - | Farivar Tabatabaee | 5:42 |
| 6 | Mano Besaz Az Aval | - | Saeed Ansar | 5:55 |
| 7 | Jangale Tarik | Reza Pishro, Ho3ein Eblis | Hasan Baba | 5:53 |
| 8 | Merci Amir Tataloo | - | Amir D-VA | 4:31 |
| 9 | Gorg 3 | Gandom (021G) | Rad Pro | 6:21 |

Cosmos (2023)
| # | Persian Title | Featuring Artists | Producer | Time |
|---|---|---|---|---|
| 1 | Marg (New Version) | - | Amir D-VA & Mojtaba Taghipour | 7:01 |
| 2 | Chetori Mishe ? (New Version) | - | Soheil Khodabandeh | 7:24 |
| 3 | Mahe Kamel | - | Hasan Baba | 6:06 |
| 4 | Kojaei ! Chi Pooshidi ? | - | Amir D-VA | 4:40 |
| 5 | Man 4 | - | Amir D-VA | 9:40 |
| 6 | Dishab | - | Hasan Baba | 6:56 |
| 7 | Cheshmato Az Hame Bedozd | - | Hasan Baba | 8:14 |
| 8 | Alo 3 | - | Amir D-VA | 6:09 |
| 9 | Tabassom Dard | - | Amir D-VA | 6:32 |
| 10 | Sarbar | - | Mehdi Moazam | 6:16 |
| 11 | Asheghi Nagaeidam | - | Soheil Khodabandeh | 7:38 |
| 12 | Puzzle | - | Mearaj Tabasi | 5:56 |

Yin Yang (2023–2026)
| # | Persian Title | Featuring Artists | Producer | Time |
|---|---|---|---|---|
| 1 | Aghrab | - | Mearaj Tabasi | 7:26 |
| 2 | Lidocaine | - | Mearaj Tabasi | 8:08 |
| 3 | To Tanha Rahe Gom Shodani | - | Mearaj Tabasi | 5:05 |
| 4 | Ye joori Ok Konidam | Merzhak | Pedram Azad | 5:40 |
| 5 | Shoolooghi | - | Mearaj Tabasi | 7:27 |
| 6 | Cheshmam Faghat Zoome Roo To | - | Amir D-VA | 6:06 |
| 7 | Be Kiram | - | Mearaj Tabasi | 7:07 |
| 8 | KhaarKosse | - | Mearaj Tabasi | 6:30 |
| 9 | Boland Boland | - | Mearaj Tabasi | 5:54 |
| 10 | Yin Yang | - | Mearaj Tabasi | 7:07 |
| 11 | Kosse Nanash | - | Mearaj Tabasi | 5:15 |
| 12 | Madar Jende | - | Mearaj Tabasi | 5:05 |
| 13 | Delam Mikhad 2 | - | Mearaj Tabasi | 6:38 |
| 14 | Hamoon Behtar Ke Beri | - | Mearaj Tabasi | 6:58 |
| 15 | Sakooye Partab | - | Mearaj Tabasi | 7:08 |
| 16 | Raftam Ke Raftam | - | Hasan Baba | 8:22 |

Behesht (Completing)
| # | Persian Title | Featuring Artists | Producer | Time |
|---|---|---|---|---|
| 1 | Boring | - | Hasan Baba | 3:46 |
| 2 | Az In Be Bad | - | Amir D-VA | 4:44 |
| 3 | Darya | Orchid | Hasan Baba | 9:07 |
| 4 | | | | |
| 5 | | | | |
| 6 | | | | |
| 7 | | | | |
| 8 | | | | |
| 9 | | | | |

== Singles ==
| # | Persian Title | Featuring Artists | Producer | Year |
|---|---|---|---|---|
| 1 | Vagheiyat | Reza Pishro, Ho3ein Eblis, Ali King | - | 2005 |
| 2 | Boro Az Pishe Man | Reza Pishro, Hossein Tohi, Rouzbeh Qaem | - | 2005 |
| 3 | Gorbe Sefat | Reza Pishro, Babak Tighe | - | 2006 |
| 4 | Dirooz Ta Emrooz | Reza Pishro, Ho3ein Eblis, Babak Tighe | - | 2006 |
| 5 | Too Chesham Bekhoon | - | Mohsen Sadeghi | 2006 |
| 6 | Cheshmaye Gorbeh | Reza Pishro | - | - |
| 7 | Nemikhamet | Ardalan Tomeh, Farshid, Masoud | - | - |
| 8 | Cheshmam Nadid | Reza Pishro, Shahin Felakat | Mahmoud Safari | - |
| 9 | Shanse Akhar | Babak Tighe | - | - |
| 10 | Mano To | Peyman | - | - |
| 11 | Aroosake Bi Cheshmoroo | Ho3ein Eblis | - | - |
| 12 | Ba Man Bash | Hossein Tohi | - | - |
| 13 | Ghalbam | Hossein Tohi | - | - |
| 14 | Donya Naya | Ardalan Tomeh, Shahin Felakat, Babak Tighe | - | - |
| 15 | Miram Az Pishet | Arshia, Emi | - | - |
| 16 | Eshghe No | Navid, Kia, SB | - | - |
| 17 | Emshab Bemoon | Reza Pishro | - | - |
| 18 | Baghe Vahsh | Reza Pishro, Hossein Tohi, Ardalan Tomeh, Shahin Felakat | - | - |
| 19 | Ghavitar Az Hamishe | Sina Nergal | - | - |
| 20 | Ghere Kamar | Reza Pishro | - | - |
| 21 | Rytme Sharghi | Reza Pishro, SB | - | - |
| 22 | Faghr | Reza Pishro, Amin Deep | - | - |
| 23 | Faryade Ma | Reza Pishro, Bahar Atish | - | - |
| 24 | Tarkam Nakon | Slim, Mad Metal | - | - |
| 25 | Tamas Karish Nakon | Reza Pishro, Hichkas, Ali Quf, Masoud Saeedi | Mahdyar Aghajani | - |
| 26 | Khanoom Khanooma | Iman | Mohsen Sadeghi | - |
| 27 | Boshghab | Hossein Tohi, Babak Tighe | - | - |
| 28 | Tavalood | Armin 2afm, Nima Nato | - | - |
| 29 | Che Kareyi | - | - | - |
| 30 | Benz Ghermez | Ardalan Tomeh, Milad Delta | - | - |
| 31 | Fati | Ardalan Tomeh | Nader Koohestani | - |
| 32 | 1001 Shab | Hossein Tohi, Ho3ein Eblis, Enzo | Mahdyar Aghajani | 2007 |
| 33 | Gorbeh Nareh | Hossein Tohi, Ardalan Tomeh | - | 2007 |
| 34 | Raze Amir | Reza Pishro, Ardalan Tomeh | - | 2007 |
| 35 | Valentine | Ardalan Tomeh | - | 2007 |
| 36 | Tanham Gozasht | Arash AP | - | 2007 |
| 37 | Goodbye | - | Mohsen Sadeghi | 2007 |
| 38 | Owje Eshgh | Ardalan Tomeh, Sina Nergal | - | 2007/Mar/21 |
| 39 | Beshin Kenaram | Hossein Tohi, Shahkar | - | 2007/Mar/21 |
| 40 | Begoo Chera | - | DJ Ashkan | 2007/Mar/25 |
| 41 | Alo Manam | Hossein Tohi, Kayot, Fajee | - | 2007/Apr/25 |
| 42 | Bavaram Nemishe | Sina Nergal | - | 2007/May/19 |
| 43 | Pedar | Reza Pishro | - | 2007/Jun/5 |
| 44 | Baraye Rap | Reza Pishro | - | 2007/Jun/8 |
| 45 | Bia Ashti Kon | Shervin, Masoud Mass | - | 2007/Jun/21 |
| 46 | Ghafas | Zakhmi | 7Khat | 2007/Jun/23 |
| 47 | Banooye Avaz | Shervin | - | 2007/Jul/8 |
| 48 | Mano Bebakhsh | Shervin | - | 2007/Jul/25 |
| 49 | Boro Az Pishe Man 2 | Hossein Tohi, Ardalan Tomeh, Rezaya, Armin 2afm, Sharpin | Mohsen Sadeghi | 2007/Aug/23 |
| 50 | Mano Oon | Hossein Tohi | Mohsen Sadeghi | 2007/Sep/8 |
| 51 | Age Roozi | Mehran Masti, P.O.M | Mohsen Sadeghi | 2007/Sep/26 |
| 52 | Zanjir | Hossein Tohi | - | 2007/Oct/28 |
| 53 | Gheyre Mostaghim | Hossein Tohi, Ardalan Tomeh, Rezaya, Armin 2afm | Nader Koohestani | 2007/Dec/1 |
| 54 | Mishnavam Migi | Hossein Tohi, P.O.M | - | 2007/Dec/11 |
| 55 | Intro T&T | Hossein Tohi | - | 2008/Jan/1 |
| 56 | Ghosaro Bikhial | Mehran Masti | - | 2008/Jan/11 |
| 57 | Hal Giri | Ardalan Tomeh, Rezaya, Armin 2afm | Nader Koohestani | 2008/Feb/28 |
| 58 | Gir Midadi | Hossein Tohi, Afshin, Amir Ali | Alex Abedi & K.O. | 2008/Mar/12 |
| 59 | Bimarefat | Ardalan Tomeh, Arash Sharifi, Esbat | - | 2008/Apr/10 |
| 60 | Pishi | Hossein Tohi | - | 2008/Apr/29 |
| 61 | Delbar | Ardalan Tomeh, Rezaya, Armin 2afm | Nader Koohestani | 2008/Aug/1 |
| 62 | Rafti Amma To Bedoon | Ardalan Tomeh, Armin 2afm | Nader Koohestani | 2008/Oct/7 |
| 63 | Jigili | Ardalan Tomeh | Nader Koohestani | 2008/Nov/3 |
| 64 | Vay Ke Che Halie | Ardalan Tomeh | Nader Koohestani | 2009/Jul/26 |
| 65 | Irane Sabz | - | Nader Koohestani | 2009 |
| 66 | Vaghti Ke Baroon Migire | Ardalan Tomeh, Armin 2afm, Saeid SJ | Shahin Khosro Abadi | 2010/Jan/2 |
| 67 | Dokhtare Rashti | Ardalan Tomeh, Armin 2afm | Nader Koohestani | 2010/Jan/31 |
| 68 | Mary Joon | Ardalan Tomeh, Armin 2afm | Alborz Mousapour | 2010/Feb/14 |
| 69 | Na Dorooghe | - | Alvand Majzoob | 2010/Feb/18 |
| 70 | Faaze Bad | Hossein Tohi | A.B.Z | 2010/Feb/26 |
| 71 | Yek Behesh Zang Bezane | Ardalan Tomeh | Ashkan Abron | 2010/May/3 |
| 72 | Begoo Binam Nadidish | - | DJ Dario | 2010/May/21 |
| 73 | Eyval | Ardalan Tomeh, Rezaya, Armin 2afm | - | 2010 |
| 74 | Alo | - | Shahin Khosro Abadi | 2010 |
| 75 | Begoo To Chi Mikhai ? | Hossein Tohi | - | 2011 |
| 76 | Parastoo | - | - | 2011 |
| 77 | Zire Saghfe Tehroon | Ardalan Tomeh | - | 2011 |
| 78 | Hoghe Baz | Saeid SJ | - | 2011 |
| 79 | Bonbast | - | Pooya Dynatonic | 2011 |
| 80 | Pishesh Nimishinam | - | Nader Koohestani | 2011 |
| 81 | Mano Dari | Ardalan Tomeh | Shahin Khosro Abadi | 2011 |
| 82 | To Be Harfe Man Goosh Kon | Ardalan Tomeh | Shahin Khosro Abadi | 2011 |
| 83 | Stay With Me | Fariman | Fariman | 2011 |
| 84 | Migi Doosam Nadari | Ardalan Tomeh, Saeid SJ | Shahin Khosro Abadi | 2011 |
| 85 | Ino Midoonam Ke Midooni | - | Amir D-VA | 2011 |
| 86 | Lalaei | - | Shahin Khosro Abadi | 2012 |
| 87 | Cheshaye Vahshi | - | Khashayar SR | 2012 |
| 88 | Shab | Ardalan Tomeh | Khashayar SR | 2012 |
| 89 | Chera Vaysadi ? | - | Saeid Shams | 2012 |
| 90 | Bande Topet | Ardalan Tomeh | Fariman | 2012 |
| 91 | Baba Oon Balast | Reza Pishro | Khashayar SR | 2012 |
| 92 | Zendegimo Vasat Midam | - | Fariman | 2012 |
| 93 | Ye Taraf Dard | Reza Pishro | Reza Pishro | 2012 |
| 94 | Komak Kon | - | Amir D-VA | 2012 |
| 95 | Badtar Shod | - | Amir D-VA | 2012 |
| 96 | Nemishe Bahat Harf Zad | Reza Pishro | Hamid Panahi | 2012 |
| 97 | Dobare Padesham | Reza Pishro | Reza Pishro | 2012 |
| 98 | Dokhtare Too Por | - | Nader Koohestani | 2013 |
| 99 | Sana Heyran | - | Nader Koohestani | 2013 |
| 100 | Arike Iran O Milad | - | Nader Koohestani | 2013 |
| 101 | Bikhiyal | - | Nader Koohestani | 2014 |
| 102 | Manam Yeki Az Oun Yazdahtam | - | Nader Koohestani | 2014 |
| 103 | Agha Komak Kon | - | Amir D-VA | 2014 |
| 104 | Mardomane Bi Eshgh | Reza Pishro | Amir D-VA | 2014 |
| 105 | Tatale Bichare | Ardalan Tomeh | Nader Koohestani | 2015 |
| 106 | Saheb | - | Nader Koohestani | 2015 |
| 107 | Energy Hasteei | - | Nader Koohestani | 2015 |
| 108 | Gorg | Reza Pishro, Ho3ein Eblis | Reza Pishro | 2015 |
| 109 | Shohada | - | Nader Koohestani | 2015 |
| 110 | Nobate Mane | Reza Pishro, Hosein Duzakh | Hosein Duzakh | 2015 |
| 111 | Etefaghe Taze | - | Nader Koohestani | 2016 |
| 112 | Emam Reza | - | Amir D-VA | 2016 |
| 113 | Goal | - | Amir D-VA | 2018 |
| 114 | Baazi | - | - | 2020 |
| 115 | Jooje Honari | - | Mearaj Tabasi | 2020 |
| 116 | Holesh | Hossein Tohi | - | 2020 |
| 117 | Nardeboon | Sohrab MJ | Tazad | 2021 |
| 118 | Amanat | - | - | 2021 |
| 119 | Hale | Reza Pishro, Ho3ein Eblis, Hossein Tohi | OHBENTO | 2022 |
| 120 | Shokret | Reza Pishro, Hossein Tohi | Nariman | 2022 |
| 121 | Baby Oonam Dooste Mane | Reza Pishro, Hossein Tohi | Hasan Baba | 2022 |
| 122 | Baby Gorg | Reza Pishro | Niavash | 2022 |
| 123 | Marg | Reza Pishro | Amir D-VA & Mojtaba Taghipour | 2022 |
| 124 | Enghelabe Solh | Reza Pishro, Pooria Putak, Bahar Atish | - | 2022 |
| 125 | Chetori Mishe ? | Reza Pishro, Ardalan Tomeh, Bahar Atish | Soheil Khodabandeh | 2022 |
| 126 | Hanooz | Sohrab MJ | Hasan Baba | 2023 |
| 127 | Raftam keh raftam(رفتم که رفتم) | - | Hassan baba(حسن بابا) | 2026(1404) |

Unofficial Song
| # | Persian Title | Featuring Artists |
|---|---|---|
| 1 | Boro | - |
| 2 | Sokoote Shahr | Paya |
| 3 | Salam | Ardalan Tomeh |
| 4 | Vastam Roo Paam | Reza Pishro |
| 5 | 100 Melyooon Rahne Kamel | Reza Pishro |
| 6 | Ghahr Nakon Na | - |

Back Vocal
| # | Persian Title | Lead Artist | Year |
|---|---|---|---|
| 1 | Khodahafez | Reza Pishro | 2006 |
| 2 | Nemikham Toro | Babak Tighe, Kayot | 2007 |
| 3 | Jahaname Saket | Reza Pishro | 2007 |
| 4 | Hanooz Yadesh Hast | Ardalan Tomeh, Mehrzad, Miloboy | 2008/Oct/21 |
| 5 | Boro | Amir D-VA | 2016 |

== Music videos ==
| Year | Persian Title | Director | Ref |
|---|---|---|---|
| 2005 | Boro Az Pishe Man | Mohammad Seyhooni | |
| 2006 | Khanoom Khanooma | Ru Clip | |
| 2007 | Too Chesham Bekhoon | Mohammad Seyhooni | |
| 2007 | Mano Oon | Sepehr V. | |
| 2008 | Gheyre Mostaghim | Mohammad Seyhooni | |
| 2008 | Gir Midadi | Sepehr V. | |
| 2008 | Hal Giri | Amir Shojaei | |
| 2009 | Vay Ke Che Halie | Boushehri Brothers | |
| 2010 | Vaghti Ke Baroon Migire | Boushehri Brothers | |
| 2010 | Yek Behesh Zang Bezane | Sepehr V. | |
| 2010 | Begoo Binam Nadidish | Hamed Rasouli | |
| 2011 | Age Rastesho Bekhay | Mohsen Baghi | |
| 2011 | Ba Yade To | Farzad EN. | |
| 2011 | Bi To Mitarsam | Mohsen Baghi | |
| 2011 | Mano Dari | Saeid SJ | |
| 2011 | Stay With Me | Mirror Art Studio | |
| 2011 | To Be Harfe Man Goosh Kon | Saeid SJ | |
| 2011 | Bonbast | Saeid SJ | |
| 2011 | Migi Doosam Nadari | Saeid SJ | |
| 2012 | Shab | Mohsen Baghi | |
| 2012 | Alo 2 | Kasra Shojaei | |
| 2012 | Hess e Mamooli | Hesam Delband | |
| 2013 | Badtar Shod | Amir Taherian | |
| 2013 | Ye Chizi Begoo | Mahan Zed & Amir Mirbagheri | |
| 2013 | Yadet Bashe | Amir Taherian | |
| 2013 | Ki Az Posht Lebaseto Mibande | Sam Zed | |
| 2013 | Khoone Khoobe | Omid Mirbagheri | |
| 2013 | Ino Midoonam Ke Midooni | Abtin. H | |
| 2013 | Nagofte Boodi | Ardeshir Ahmadi | |
| 2013 | Khabam Nmibareh | Farid Soudi | |
| 2014 | Bezar Too Hale Khodam Basham | Sepehr V. | |
| 2014 | Manam Yeki Az Oun Yazdahtam | Sepehr V. | |
| 2014 | Ba To | Ardeshir Ahmadi | |
| 2014 | To Too Dide Man Nisti | Ardeshir Ahmadi | |
| 2015 | Saheb | Tina Akhoondtabar | |
| 2015 | Energy Hasteei | Ardeshir Ahmadi | |
| 2015 | Shohada | Ardeshir Ahmadi | |
| 2015 | Agha Komak Kon | – | |
| 2016 | Taadol | Sepehr V. | |
| 2016 | Mamnoo | Ardeshir Ahmadi | |
| 2016 | To Hameja Boodi | +1 Team | |
| 2016 | Baghalam Kon | Sepehr V. | |
| 2017 | Dari Be Chi Fekr Mikoni | Zigurat Pictures | |
| 2017 | Donya | Amin Hosseinpoor | |
| 2017 | Pile | Hesam Delband | |
| 2018 | Eyde Emsal | Amin Hosseinpoor | |
| 2018 | Goal | Naghmeh Maghsoudlou | |
| 2018 | Maskhare Bazi | Emad Khiabanian | |
| 2020 | Jahanam | Cyrus Azimzadeh | |
| 2021 | Heyf Didid Raft | HM Hemo | |
| 2021 | Gedaei | HM Hemo | |
