= Samiyeh Lak =

Iranian actress (born 1980)

- سامیه لک
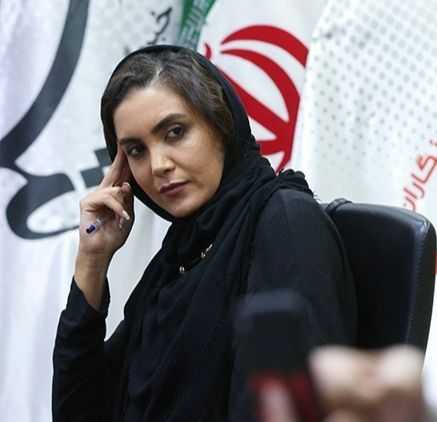
- Lak in September 2019
- Born: 30 May 1980 (age 45); Tehran, Iran
- Occupation: Actress
- Years active: 2006–present

Samiyeh Lak (Persian: سامیه لک; born 30 May 1980) is an Iranian film and television actress. She rose to prominence at the age of 26 for her performance in the television series The Gradual Death of a Dream, directed by Fereydoun Jeyrani. Lak received an Honorary Diploma for Best Actress at the 14th International Sport Movies Festival for her role in the feature film Knockout.

== Early life and career ==
Lak was born in 1980 in Tehran, Iran. She studied architecture at the Technical and Vocational University, earning an associate degree.

In 2003, she moved to the United Arab Emirates to continue her studies in architecture. Lak returned to Iran in 2006 to appear in the television series The Gradual Death of a Dream, and subsequently got married in Iran. In addition to her acting career, she is also a practicing architect.

== Filmography ==
=== Film ===
Year	Title	Role	Director	Ref(s)
2023	Gharib	Fatemeh, wife of Mohammad Boroujerdi	Mohammad Hosein Latifi	
2019	Knockout		Farnaz Amini	
2018	Under The Supervision	Mina	Majid Salehi	
2018	Sapphire	addicted girl	Ahmad Tajari	

=== Web ===
Year	Title	Role	Director	Platform	Ref(s)
2021	Island	Shakiba	Siroos Moghaddam	Filimo	
2018	Aghazadeh	Sahar	Behrang Tofighi	Filimo	
2010	Ghalbe Yakhi (season1)	Bahar	Mohammad Hossein Latifi	Video CD	
2011	Ghalbe Yakhi (season2)	Bahar	Mohammad Hossein Latifi	Video CD	

=== Television ===
Year	Title	Role	Director	Notes	Network	Ref(s)
2019	silent terror	Elaheh	Ahmad Moazemi	TV series	IRIB TV1	
2017	Anam	Aynaz	Javad Afshar	TV series	IRIB TV3	
2010	A house without birds	Ziba	Kazem Ma'asoumi	TV series	IRIB TV5	
2008	Singing in the rain		Sadreddin Shajareh	TV series	IRIB TV4	
2006	The Gradual Death of a Dream	Maral Azimi	Fereydoun Jeyrani	TV series	IRIB TV2	

== Awards and nominations ==
Award	Year	Category	Ref(s)
International Sport Movies Festival	2024	Best Actress in a Leading Role	

== See also ==
- List of Iranian women
- Iranian cinema
- List of Iranian actresses
