= Aghazadeh (TV series) =

Iranian television series

- Persian: آقازاده
- Genre: Drama; Crime
- Written by: Hamed Angha
- Directed by: Behrang Tofighi
- Starring: Pardis Pourabedini; Sina Mehrad; Amir Aghaei; Amin Tarokh; Mehdi Soltani; Amin Hayai; Niki Karimi; Kambiz Dirbaz; Jamshid Hashempour; Laya Zanganeh; Soraya Ghasemi; Diba Zahedi; Mohammad Hossein Latifi
- Composers: Sattar Oraki; Yahya Sepehri Shakib
- Country of origin: Iran
- Original language: Persian
- No. of seasons: 1
- No. of episodes: 29

Production
- Producer: Hamed Angha (Product of Owj Arts and Media Organization)
- Production locations: Tehran; Mashhad
- Cinematography: Majid Golsefidi
- Editors: Elham Badie; Amir Sheiban Khani
- Running time: 55 minutes

Original release
- Network: Filimo
- Release: 27 June 2020 – 9 January 2021

Aghazadeh (Persian: آقازاده) is an Iranian television series of drama and crime genre. The series is produced and written by Hamed Angha and directed by Behrang Tofighi in 29 episodes.

== Storyline ==
"Aghazadeh" is a social and political drama and the story of an Aghazadeh named Nima Bahri (Amir Aghaei), who has committed economic violations. An agent named Hamed Tehrani (Sina Mehrad), who is also an Aghazadeh, but with completely opposite characteristics, tries to expose Nima.

== Cast ==
- Pardis Pourabedini
- Sina Mehrad
- Amir Aghaei
- Amin Tarokh
- Mehdi Soltani
- Amin Hayai
- Niki Karimi
- Kambiz Dirbaz
- Jamshid Hashempour
- Laya Zanganeh
- Soraya Ghasemi
- Diba Zahedi
- Mohammad Hossein Latifi
- Mehdi Koushki
- Alireza vatan parast
- Kaveh Khodashenas
- Saeed Dakh
- Masoud Forotan
- Samieh Lak
- Rozbeh Moeini
- Ehsan Amanai
- Akbar Rahmati
- Majid Esmaeili

== Reception ==
=== Awards and nominations ===
| Year | Award | Category | Recipient | Result | Ref. |
|---|---|---|---|---|---|
| 2021 | 21st Hafez Awards | Best Television Series | Aghazadeh | Nominated | |
| 2021 | 21st Hafez Awards | Best Director – Television Series | Behrang Tofighi | Nominated | |
| 2021 | 21st Hafez Awards | Best Screenplay – Television Series | Hamed Angha | Nominated | |
| 2021 | 21st Hafez Awards | Best Actor – Television Series Drama | Amir Aghaei | Won | |
| 2021 | 21st Hafez Awards | Best Actress – Television Series Drama | Pardis Pourabedini | Nominated | |
| 2021 | 21st Hafez Awards | Best Original Song | ''Mask'' (Ali Zandvakili, Hossein Ghyasi, Alireza Afkari) | Nominated | |
