= Owraki =

Owraki or Oraki (Persian: اورکی) is an Iranian last name and may refer to:

- Sattar Oraki
- Nima Owraki
- Nezi Owraki
