= Hossein Abedini =

Iranian actor

Hossein Abedini (Persian: حسین عابدینی) is an Iranian actor. His debut film was Pedar (Father), which was released in 1996 and directed by Majid Majidi. He received critical acclaim after portraying Lateef, a 17-year-old native Iranian boy in the 2001 film Baran, which was also directed by Majid Majidi. His other films include Rasm-e ashegh-koshi (Tradition of lover killing) in 2004, Wind Blows in the Meadow (2009) and Rouyidan Dar Bad (Growing in the wind) in 2012.

== Early life ==
Abedini was born in Zanjan, Iran. From the beginning, Abedini was not a professional actor. Despite entering acting by chance, he won the Crystal Symorgh for Best Actor in a leading role for Baran at the 19th Fajr International Film Festival.

Majid Majidi once told in an interview to Gerald Peary in December 2002 that, "When I found him, he was twelve years old, had quit school, and worked in a fruit market. When Pedar (Father) was screened, he was very happy, and said, 'I'm going to get famous, and when a truck of watermelons arrives, everyone will buy from me!' We encouraged Hossein to go to school, but it's now his tenth year still in the fruit market."

== Career ==
His debut film was Pedar directed by Majid Majidi in which he played the major role of a young boy Latif, who was the friend of Mehrollah whose father has recently died. After the success of Pedar, Majidi again cast Hossein in his Baran, which was major critical success. Hossein played the role of Lateef, a 17-year-old Iranian worker who falls in love with Rahmat, an Afghan worker for which he earned critical acclaim worldwide.

Abedini has also acted in Rasm-e ashegh-koshi (Tradition of lover killing) in 2004, Wind Blows in the Meadow (2009), Rouyidan Dar Bad (Growing in the wind) (2012) and Taboo in 2015.

== Awards and nominations ==
Year	Event	Award	Category	Movie	Result
1998	16th Ale Kino! International; Young Audience Film Festival	Poznań Goats	Best Foreign Child Actor or Actress	The Father	Won
2001	Fajr Film Festival	Crystal Simorgh	Best Actor in a Leading Role	Rain	Won
