= Aamir Bashir =

Indian actor and producer (born 1970)

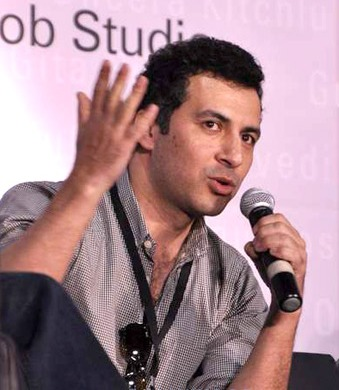
- Bashir in 2013
- Born: Jammu and Kashmir, India
- Occupations: Actor; film producer; director
- Years active: 1998–present

Aamir Bashir is an Indian actor, film producer, and director who works in Hindi films. He is best known for his role in the thriller film, A Wednesday, which earned him a Screen Award nomination for Best Actor in a Supporting Role. For his directorial debut film Harud, he won the National Film Award for Best Urdu Feature Film at the 60th National Film Awards. He is also known for his work in several other film productions.

== Early life and education ==
Bashir was born and raised in Kashmir, the son of the retired Chief Justice of Jammu and Kashmir High Court. He is a graduate of St. Stephen's College, University of Delhi.

== Career ==
His acting career began with a small role in the Bhanwar TV series, and several TV advertisements, leading to his film debut Split Wide Open (1999) and the telefilm Doordarshan Srinagar. He appeared in the 2003 film Armaan. Acclaim came his way in 2008, with the thriller A Wednesday, where he played the role of a police inspector; the film also won him a Screen Awards nomination for Best Actor in a Supporting Role.

Bashir was set to play Shahrukh Khan's younger brother in the film My Name is Khan, but was denied a visa to the United States in December 2008, where the film was being shot. He was eventually replaced by Jimmy Sheirgill.

In 2010, Bashir's directorial debut Harud premiered at the 2010 Toronto International Film Festival. The film stars Reza Naji and Shahnawaz Bhat and takes place in Kashmir. It won the National Award for Best Urdu Feature Film at the 60th National Film Awards.

He had a recurring role in Netflix's first Indian original series Sacred Games. In 2019, he reprised his role in the second season of Sacred Games and appeared in another Amazon Prime series Inside Edge. Later that year, he joined the cast of Mira Nair's A Suitable Boy.

Public stances and advocacy

In November 2012, Bashir joined more than 200 Indian artists, writers and civil society members in appealing to President of India Pranab Mukherjee to commute the death sentence of Ajmal Kasab, the convicted terrorist involved in the 2008 Mumbai attacks who was convicted in connection with the 2008 Mumbai attacks, to life imprisonment. The appeal reflected the signatories opposition to capital punishment..

== Filmography ==
=== As actor ===
==== Films ====
Year	Title	Role	Notes	Ref.
1999	Split Wide Open	The Husband	English film	
2003	Armaan	Dr. Sanjay		
2004	Isse Kehte Hai Golmaal Ghar		Telefilm	
2005	Sankaal: The Latch	Rahul	Short film	
2006	Pyaar Ke Side Effects	Kapil Sharma		
2007	Frozen	Col. Sham Kaushal		
2007	The Great Indian Butterfly	Krish Kumar		
2008	Mumbai Cutting			
2008	A Wednesday!	Inspector Jai Pratap Singh		
2009	Raat Gayi, Baat Gayi?	Prasad		
2010	Peepli Live	Vivek		
2012	Future To Bright Hai Ji	Ajay Kumar		
2014	Haider	Liyaqat Lone		
2015	Jai Ho Democracy	Bashir Baig		
2017	Gurgaon	Bhoopi Hooda		
2018	Hope Aur Hum	Neeraj		
2019	Dolly Kitty Aur Woh Chamakte Sitare	Amit Yadav		
2019	Laal Kaptaan	Adham Khan		
2019	72 Hoorain	Bilal Ahmed	Delayed release	
2023	Rocky Aur Rani Kii Prem Kahaani	Tijori Randhawa		
2023	Tiger 3	Rehan Nazar		

==== Television ====
Year	Title	Role	Notes	Ref.
1998	Alpviram	Rohit Bakshi		
2001	Sarhadein	Aman		
2006	Rishtey			

==== Web series ====
Year	Title	Role	Platform	Notes	Ref.
2018	Sacred Games	Majid Khan	Netflix		
2019–2021	Inside Edge	Yashwardhan Patil / Bhaisahab	Amazon Prime Video		
2020	A Suitable Boy	Nawab Sahib	BBC One (Netflix in India)		
2023	School of Lies	Samuel "Sam" Singh	Amazon Prime Video		
2026	Raakh	Ashok Arora	Amazon Prime Video		

==== Theatre ====
Year	Title	Role	Venue	Ref.
2024	Dastan-e-Partition	Dastango	India Habitat Centre	
2024	Dastan-e-Partition	Dastango	Prithvi Theatre	

=== As director ===
- Harud (2010)
- The Winter Within (2022)

== Awards ==
- 2012: National Film Award for Best Feature Film in Urdu: Harud
