= Baduk =

Baduk may refer to:

- Baduk (game), Korean name for the board game Go
- Baduk (film), 1992 Iranian film by director Majid Majidi
