= Motherless (film) =

- Film poster
- Directed by: Morteza Fatemi
- Written by: Morteza Fatemi
- Produced by: Mohammad Reza Mesbah; Ali Oji
- Starring: Amir Aghaei; Mitra Hajjar; Pardis Pourabedini; Pejman Jamshidi
- Cinematography: Masoud Salami
- Edited by: Mohammad Najarian
- Production company: Nasim Film Center
- Release date: February 1, 2022 (FIFF)
- Country: Iran
- Language: Persian

Motherless (Persian: بی مادر, romanized: Bi Madar) is a 2022 Iranian drama film directed and written by Morteza Fatemi. The film screened for the first time at the 40th Fajr Film Festival.

== Premise ==
The quiet life of Amirali (Amir Aghaee) and his wife (Mitra Hajjar), by one of them insisting on a decision, inadvertently enters into complex trials, dilemmas, and moral hazards. Man gains nothing unless he loses things, and every decision has a price to be paid.

== Cast ==
- Amir Aghaei as Amirali
- Mitra Hajjar as Marjan
- Pardis Pourabedini as Mahrouz
- Pejman Jamshidi as Mahmoud
- Ali Oji
- Bita Azizoghli
- Sara Mohammadi
- Fatemeh Mirzaei
