= Towards Freedom (film) =

- Film poster
- در بست آزادی
- Directed by: Mehrshad Karkhani
- Written by: Mehrshad Karkhani
- Produced by: Mohammad Ghazi; Production Manager: Reza Salami
- Starring: Omid Olomi; Mani Heidari; Sahar Ghoreishi; Soroush Sehhat; Reza Naji; Shohreh Ghamar
- Cinematography: Dariush Ayari
- Edited by: Faramarz Hootham
- Music by: Sattar Oraki
- Release date: 1 October 2014
- Running time: 90 minutes
- Country: Iran
- Language: Persian

Towards Freedom (Persian: در بست آزادی) is a 2014 Iranian drama film written and directed by Mehrshad Karkhani.

== Plot ==
Two young people (Mani Heidari & Omid Olomi) live in an old and closed cinema, one day they decide to go inside the city to get their money.

== Cast ==
- Omid Olomi
- Mani Heidari
- Sahar Ghoreishi
- Soroush Sehhat
- Reza Naji
- Shohreh Ghamar
- Ramin Rastad
- Ladan Parvin
- Hesam Shojaei
- Keramat Roudsaz
- Zabi Afshar
- Iman Mahmoodi
- Faranak Koshafar
