= Reza Naji =

Iranian actor

- رضا ناجی
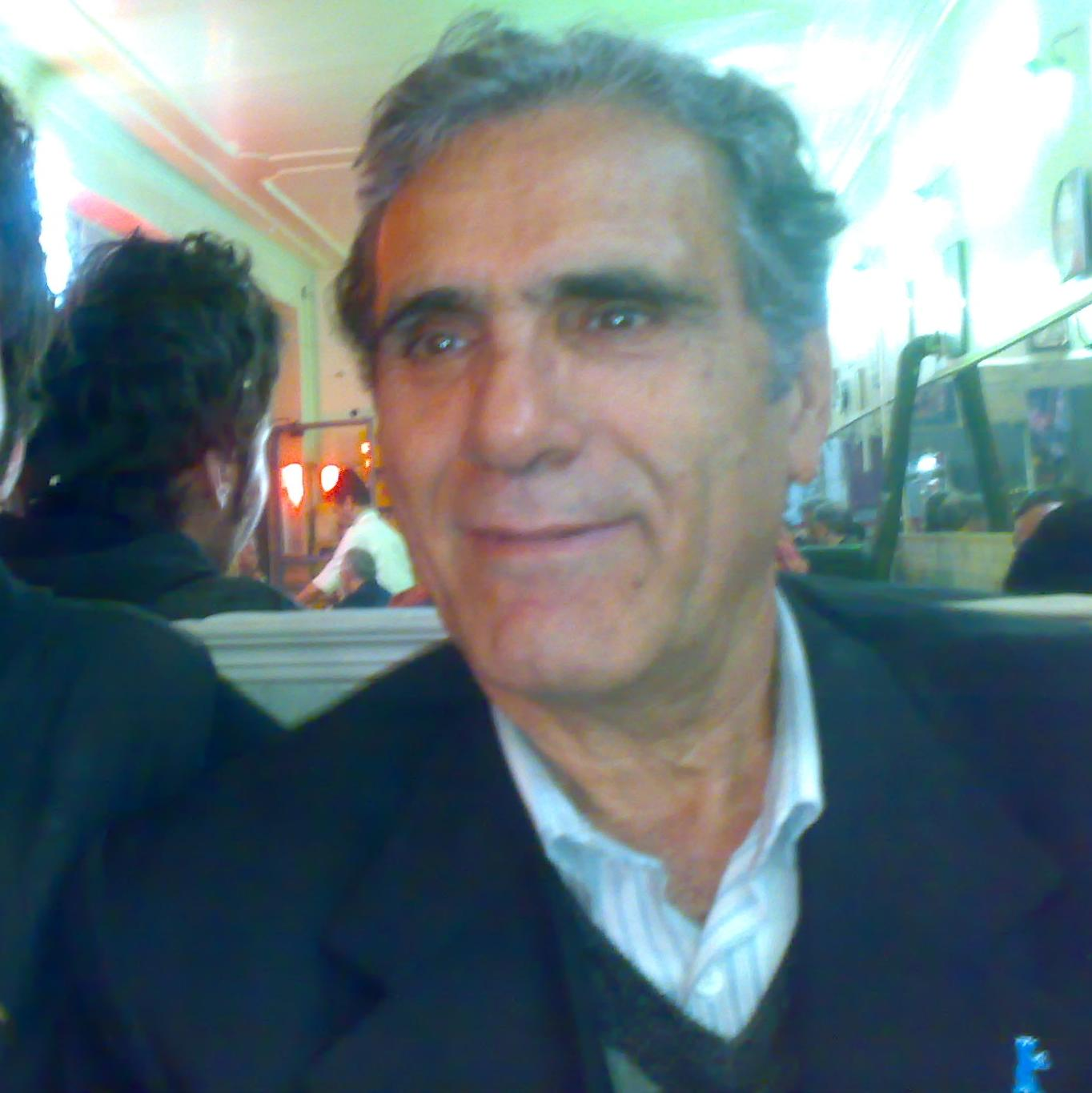
- Naji in 2008, after Berlin International Film Festival
- Born: 26 December 1942 (age 83); Tabriz, Iran

Mohamad Reza Amir Naji is an Iranian theatre, film and TV actor and an iconic figure of Iranian cinema.

== Career ==
Naji started his career in theater as a teenager. While serving in the Iranian army, he continued to perform. His first film role was Children of Heaven (1997), which proved to be a breakthrough. For the role of Ali's father, director Majid Majidi sought an actor with an Azeri accent, and Naji was carefully selected from a group of 2,500 actors tested for the role.

Since then, he has played various roles in Iranian cinema. Among his most notable performances is Majidi's The Song of Sparrows, for which Naji won the Silver Bear at the Berlin International Film Festival, and Best Performance by an Actor at the 2008 Asia Pacific Screen Awards.

== Filmography ==
Year	Title	Role	Notes
1997	Children of Heaven	Ali's Father	
1998	Birth of a Butterfly		
2001	Baran	Memar	
2002	Parandeh baz-e kouchak		
2005	The Willow Tree	Morteza	
2007	Sargije		
2008	The Song of Sparrows	Karim	Silver Bear, Berlin Film Festival
2014	Harud	Yusuf	Kashmiri film
2014	Towards Freedom		
2014	Teacher		
2014	Love is not Closed		
2018	We Are All Together		
2020	After the Incident		
2023	The Crab	Eghbal	

== Awards ==
- 2008: Berlin International Film Festival: Silver Bear for Best Actor: The Song of Sparrows
- 2008: Best Performance by an Actor at the Asia Pacific Screen Awards.
