= Gharib (film) =

Iranian 2023 film

- غریب
- Directed by: Mohammad Hossein Latifi
- Produced by: Hamed Angha (Production of Owj Arts and Media Organization)
- Starring: Babak Hamidian; Pardis Pourabedini; Mehran Ahmadi; Farhad Ghaemian
- Release date: 2023
- Country: Iran
- Language: Persian

Gharib (Unknown) (Persian: غریب) is a 2023 Iranian biographical war film directed by Mohammad Hosein Latifi. Gharib portrays the story of an Iranian hero, Mohammad Boroujerdi, in Kurdistan in 1981–1982.

Gharib won six awards and earned 10 nominations at the 41st Fajr Film Festival.

== Synopsis ==
"The Stranger" is a depiction of the events in Kurdistan that began a path to transform Mohammad Boroujerdi into the Messiah of Kurdistan. The film "The Stranger" depicts a part of Commander Mohammad Boroujerdi's era in the western region, and Hamed Angha wrote the screenplay based on the book "Mohammad; Messiah of Kurdistan" by Nosratollah Mahmoudzadeh. "The Stranger" will mark the return of Mohammad Hossein Latifi to the cinema of the Sacred Defense, and Babak Hamidian, who plays Boroujerdi, will once again experience playing the role of a martyr through this film.

== Cast ==
- Babak Hamidian
- Pardis Pourabedini
- Hazhirsam Ahmadi
- Rahim Norouzi
- Hesam Mahmoudi
- Samiyeh Lak
- Mehran Ahmadi
- Farhad Ghaemian

== Awards ==
=== 41st Fajr Film Festival ===
Year	Award	Category	recipient	Result
2023	Fajr International Film Festival	Special Jury Prize	Mohammad Hosein Latifi	Won
2023	Fajr International Film Festival	Best Director	Mohammad Hosein Latifi	Nominated
2023	Fajr International Film Festival	Best National Film	Mohammad Hosein Latifi	Won
2023	Fajr International Film Festival	Best Actress	Pardis Pourabedini	Won
2023	Fajr International Film Festival	Best Supporting Actor	Farhad Ghaemian	Honorary diploma
2023	Fajr International Film Festival	Best Supporting Actor	Mehran Ahmadi	Nominated
2023	Fajr International Film Festival	Best Special Effects	Hamid Rasoulian	Won
2023	Fajr International Film Festival	Best Makeup	Shahram Khalaj	Won
2023	Fajr International Film Festival	Best Costume Design	Mohammadreza Shojaei	Nominated
2023	Fajr International Film Festival	Best Production Design	Mohammadreza Shojaei	Won
