= Barefoot to Herat =

2002 film by Majid Majidi

- Directed by: Majid Majidi
- Written by: Majid Majidi
- Produced by: Majid Majidi, Fouad Nahas
- Distributed by: 2t3mtv Television Inc. (Canada)
- Release date: 2002
- Running time: 70 min.
- Country: Iran
- Language: Persian

Barefoot to Herat (Persian: پابرهنه تا هرات, Pa Berahneh ta Herat) is a 2002 Iranian film by Majid Majidi. It is a documentary about the plight of Afghan refugees just after the 2001 military offensive against the Taliban.

== Background ==
The film was shot primarily at two refugee camps in Western Afghanistan, one called Makaki in a territory controlled by the Northern Alliance. The rest of the film was shot at another camp called Maslakh, in the city of Herat. The camps were makeshift and the conditions inhumane, making them ill-suited for families whose lives had been torn apart by war. Through interviews with peasants, soldiers, children, and the elderly, Majidi finds the human spirit intact, and still in need of joy and memories and dreams.

== Awards ==
- 2004 FIPRESCI Prize, Greece

== Sources ==
- Synopsis from Cinemajidi.com
