= The Color of Paradise =

The Color of Paradise (Rang-e Khoda)
- Theatrical release poster
- Directed by: Majid Majidi
- Written by: Majid Majidi
- Starring: Hossein Mahjoub; Mohsen Ramezani; Salameh Feyzi; Farahnaz Safari
- Cinematography: Mohammad Davudi
- Edited by: Hassan Hassandoost
- Music by: Alireza Kohandairy
- Production company: Varahonar Company
- Distributed by: Varahonar Company
- Release date: February 9, 1999
- Running time: 90 minutes
- Country: Iran
- Language: Persian

The Color of Paradise (Persian: رنگ خدا, Rang-e Khodā, literally The Color of God) is a 1999 Iranian film directed by Majid Majidi.

== Plot ==
A blind boy named Mohammad is released from his special school in Tehran for summer vacation. His father, Hashem, shamed and burdened by Mohammad's blindness, arrives late to pick him up and then tries to convince the headmaster to keep Mohammad over the summer. The headmaster refuses, so Hashem eventually takes Mohammad home.

Hashem, who is a widower, wants to marry a local woman and prepares for the wedding. He approaches the woman's parents with gifts, and they give him their blessing. He attempts to hide the fact that his son is blind because he fears that the woman's family will see it as a bad omen.

Meanwhile, Mohammad happily roams around the hills of his village with his sisters. He touches and feels the nature around him, displaying a unique attitude toward it and seeming to understand its rhythms and textures as a language. He goes to the local school with his sisters and reads the lessons from the textbook in Braille, which amazes the other students and the teacher.

Fearing his bride-to-be's family will learn of Mohammad, Hashem takes him away and leaves him with a blind carpenter who agrees to make him an apprentice. The carpenter begins to mentor him, but Mohammad cries and states that he wants to see God. He says that God must not love him for making him blind, and says that his teacher taught that God loves the blind children more for their blindness. Mohammad then questions why God should make him blind if he truly loves him more. He also says that he wanted to be able to see God, and that his teacher said that God is everywhere and that one can also feel God. The carpenter simply remarks that he agrees and walks away, possibly affected by the boy's words as he himself is blind.

Mohammad's grandmother is heartbroken when she learns that Hashem sent Mohammad away and, in her distress, falls ill. She leaves the family home, but Hashem tries to convince her to stay, questioning his destiny and lamenting his deceased wife and blind son. As she leaves, she drops a hairpin from Mohammad into a pond and faints, falling into the water. Hashem carries her back home. Eventually, Mohammad's grandmother dies. The bride's family sees this as a bad omen, and the wedding is called off.

His hopes destroyed, Hashem decides to bring Mohammad back home. The film shows glimpses of shame and pity that Hashem felt for himself and Mohammad all along. He returns to the blind carpenter and retrieves Mohammad. They head for home through the woods. As they cross a small wooden bridge over a rushing river, the bridge collapses and Mohammad falls into the water, carried away by the strong current. For a moment, Hashem stands petrified at the sight of Mohammad being carried away; he appears to be torn between rescuing him or not rescuing him and freeing himself of his "burden." Moments later, he decides to rescue Mohammad and dashes into the river, where he is also carried away by the current.

Sometime later, Hashem wakes up on the shore of the Caspian Sea and sees Mohammad lying motionless a short distance away. He stumbles toward Mohammad's body and takes him in his arms. He weeps over Mohammad's body and looks to the sky. A woodpecker is heard, and the sun comes out. Mohammad's fingers slowly start to move. Perhaps he is "reading" the sound with his fingers as if they are Braille dots, or maybe, in his death, he has finally touched God.

== Cast ==
- Hossein Mahjoub as Hashem (Mohammad's father)
- Mohsen Ramezani as Mohammad (blind boy)
- Salameh Feyzi as Mohammad's grandmother

== Reception ==
On the review aggregator website Rotten Tomatoes, 87% of 31 critics' reviews are positive, with an average rating of 7.6/10. Metacritic, which uses a weighted average, assigned the film a score of 80 out of 100, based on 25 critics, indicating "generally favorable" reviews.
