= Baran (film) =

2001 film by Majid Majidi

- DVD cover
- Directed by: Majid Majidi
- Written by: Majid Majidi
- Produced by: Majid Majidi; Fouad Nahas
- Starring: Hossein Abedini; Zahra Bahrami; Mohammad Amir Naji; Abbas Rahimi; Gholam Ali Bakhshi
- Music by: Ahmad Pejman
- Distributed by: Miramax Films
- Release date: 31 January 2001 (Fajr)
- Running time: 94 minutes
- Country: Iran
- Languages: Persian; Azeri

Baran (Persian: باران; literally: Rain) is a 2001 Iranian film directed by Majid Majidi, based on an original script by Majid Majidi. The movie is set during recent times in which there are many Afghan refugees living on the outskirts of Tehran. Baran won a number of awards both nationally and internationally for the director and writer Majid Majidi.

== Synopsis ==
It is winter in Tehran. Lateef is 17. He works at a construction site managed by Memar. Lateef prepares and serve tea and food for the workers with whom he frequently quarrels. They come from throughout Iran, but particularly Iranian Azerbaijan. Some are refugees from Afghanistan. They have no identity cards and are employed illegally. When labour inspectors arrive, they must hide. An Afghan worker, Najaf, falls, breaks his leg and is taken to hospital. Soltan, another Afghan, brings in Rahmat, Najaf's son, who is around 14 years old, to replace him. Memar soon realizes that Rahmat is too young and switches the jobs of Rahmat and Lateef. Lateef is furious, threatens Rahmat, tries to sabotage his work and spies on him.

One day, he is shocked to discover that Rahmat is a girl. As he watches her comb her hair, he becomes disoriented and hears strange sounds. His attitude changes; he becomes protective, helpful and desperately in love. While Rahmat does not express herself, over time she seems to respond. During a surprise visit of the inspectors, they encounter Rahmat. She panics and flees, and they pursue her. Lateef restrains the inspectors, allowing Rahmat to escape. Lateef is beaten and arrested. Memar must pay a fine, comply with the law, and lay off all illegals.

Lateef can't bear Rahmat's absence, and seeks Soltan for news. He goes to where the Afghans live, walks around, meets an enigmatic cobbler, and ends up in the courtyard of a shrine near a graveyard where Afghans are gathered for a milk ceremony. He inquires about Soltan, but gets no clues. Among the Afghans stands Rahmat in female clothing. She sees Lateef, stares at him, then leaves. Lateef is not aware of her. The next day, he finds Soltan, and learns that Rahmat works near the river. Lateef rushes there to find Rahmat working unhappily with other women carrying heavy stones. He is distressed, and wants to find a way to help her. He obtains his wages and hands them to Soltan to pass them to Najaf. They agree to meet the next day at the shrine. Instead of Soltan, Najaf shows up to inform Lateef that Soltan has gone to Afghanistan. He tells Lateef that Soltan came to him and offered him money he'd borrowed from someone but he refused it and advised Soltan to use it to leave for Afghanistan where he had a serious family issue.

The next day, Lateef overhears that Najaf is also faced with family problems in Afghanistan, as his brother has been killed. He hears Rahmat's real name is Baran. Lateef goes to find an exhausted Baran carrying logs. The next morning, Najaf is at the construction site begging Memar unsuccessfully for a loan. Lateef sells the only valuable thing he has, his identity card. When he brings the money, Lateef learns that Najaf and his family will use it to return to Afghanistan. Lateef is overwhelmed and finds refuge in the shrine. There, he hears the same sounds he heard when he first saw Baran. He accepts his fate.

The next day, while helping Najaf to load a truck with household effects, Lateef is finally face-to-face with Baran. Through eye contact and proximity, they exchange their feelings of love. As Baran covers herself and walks to the truck, her shoe gets stuck. Lateef takes her shoe out of the mud, and hands it to her. The truck takes Baran away. Alone, Lateef stares at the footstep in the mud, and smiles while the rain covers it.

== Release ==
Miramax released the film for viewing in New York and Los Angeles on 7 December 2001.

== Cast ==
- Hossein Abedini as Lateef, worker
- Zahra Bahrami as Baran/Rahmat
- Mohammad Amir Naji as Memar, employer
- Abbas Rahimi as Soltan, another worker
- Gholam Ali Bakhshi as Najaf, a worker, Rahmat/Baran's father

== Awards ==
- 2001 Grand Prix of the Americas Award for Best Film at the Montreal World Film Festival
- 2001 Best Screenplay & Best Director at the Gijón International Film Festival
- 2001 Oecumenical Special Award for Best Film at the Montreal World Film Festival
- 2001 Nominated Best Foreign Film Satellite Awards
- 2001 Best Film & Best Director Awards at the 19th Fajr International Film Festival

== See also ==
- Majid Majidi
- Cross-dressing in film and television
- Osama (film)
