= Ekbatan (film) =

- Film poster
- Directed by: Mehrshad Karkhani
- Written by: Mehrshad Karkhani
- Produced by: Mohsen Jahed and Roya Sharif
- Starring: Sahar Ghoreishi; Mani Heidari; Shahed Ahmadloo; Mazdak Mirabedini; Soroush Sehhat; Davoud Rashidi
- Cinematography: Mohsen Jahed
- Music by: Sattar Oraki
- Release date: February 2012
- Running time: 90 minutes
- Country: Iran
- Language: Persian

Ekbatan (Persian: اکباتان) is a 2012 Iranian Drama written and directed by Mehrshad Karkhani.

== Plot ==
Alborz, who has been recently freed from the prison, plans a robbery to pay his sister's debts.

== Cast ==
- Sahar Ghoreishi
- Mani Heidari
- Shahed Ahmadloo
- Mazdak Mirabedini
- Soroush Sehhat
- Davoud Rashidi
- Pourandokht Mahiman
