= Harud =

2010 Indian film

- Directed by: Aamir Bashir
- Screenplay by: Aamir Bashir; Mahmood Farooqui; Shanker Raman
- Produced by: Aamir Bashir; Shanker Raman
- Starring: Reza Naji; Shahnawaz Bhat; Shamim Basharat; Salma Ashai; Mudessir Ahmed Khan; Rayes Mohiuddin
- Cinematography: Shanker Raman
- Edited by: Shan Mohammed
- Music by: Suhaas Ahuja; Naren Chandavarkar; Benedict Taylor
- Production company: Chasingtales
- Release date: 2010
- Running time: 96 minutes
- Country: India
- Language: Kashmiri

Harud (lit. 'Autumn') is a 2010 Indian Kashmiri-language film directed by Aamir Bashir in his feature-film directorial debut. It is an independent, art house drama. Harud premiered at the 2010 Toronto International Film Festival. The film stars Reza Naji and Shahnawaz Bhat and takes place in Srinagar. It tells the story of a family who lives in the conflict-ridden region of Kashmir.

== Cast ==
- Reza Naji as Yusuf
- Shahnawaz Bhat as Rafiq
- Shamim Basharat as Fatima
- Salma Ashai as Shaheen
- Mudessir Ahmed Khan as Ishaq
- Rayes Mohiuddin as Aslam
- Ruhool Ahmad Kawa
