= The Father (1996 film) =

1996 film by Majid Majidi

- Directed by: Majid Majidi
- Written by: Majid Majidi, Seyed Mehdi Shojai
- Produced by: Ardashir Iran-Nezhad Center of Documentary & Experimental Cinema
- Starring: Hassan Sadeghi, Mohammad Kasebi, Hossein Abedini, Parivash Nazarieh
- Distributed by: Panorama Entertainment (Hong Kong)
- Release date: 1996
- Running time: 96 min.
- Language: Persian

The Father (Persian:پدر , pedar) is a 1996 Iranian film by director Majid Majidi. It won a number of awards at film festivals both within Iran and internationally. The word pedar means father in Persian.

== Synopsis ==
Fourteen-year-old Mehrollah's father is killed while a passenger on the motorcycle that Mehrollah is learning to ride. To support his family, Mehrollah takes a job in the city. Upon returning for a visit, he learns from his friend Latif that his mother has remarried to a policeman and moved to a larger house. This deeply angers Mehrollah, who refuses to accept his new step father; he also becomes bitter towards his mother.

Taking up residence in the family's former home, Mehrollah kidnaps his young sisters, only to have his friend Latif betray their location. Latif acts as the go between for Mehrollah and his estranged family. When Mehrollah is injured, Latif summons his step father, who takes Mehrollah home to recover. As he gets better, he steals his stepfather's service revolver, and flees to the city with Latif. The step father heads to the city on motorcycle and arrests both of the boys. Placing Latif on a bus, he takes Mehrollah back home on his motorcycle, but on the way the motorcycle breaks down and they become stranded in the desert. Through the extreme hardship that follows, Mehrollah slowly softens, comes to accept his stepfather.

== Awards ==
- 1996, Crystal Simorgh Fajr Film Festival
- 1996 Prize of the Jury San Sebastián International Film Festival
- 1996 C.I.C.A.E. Award, Holden Award for the Best Script, Jury Special Prize Torino International Festival of Young Cinema
- 1997, Golden Dolphin Festróia - Tróia International Film Festival
- 1998, 16th Ale Kino! Festival
  - Marcinek - Special Mention by Children Jury
  - Special Mention by Professional Jury
  - Best Foreign Child Actor or Actress - Hossein Abedini

== Sources ==
- All Movie synopsis
- IMDB Awards section
- Italian synopsis
