= Abedini =

Abedini (Persian: عابدینی) is an Iranian surname. Notable people with the surname include:

- Amir Abedini (born 1949), Iranian football club chairman
- Fardin Abedini (born 1991), Iranian footballer
- Hossein Abedini, Iranian actor
- Mojtaba Abedini (born 1984), Iranian Olympic fencer
- Reza Abedini (born 1967), Iranian graphic designer
- Saeed Abedini (born 1980), Iranian-American Christian pastor
