= Sahar Ghoreishi =

Iranian actress (born 1987)

- سحر قریشی
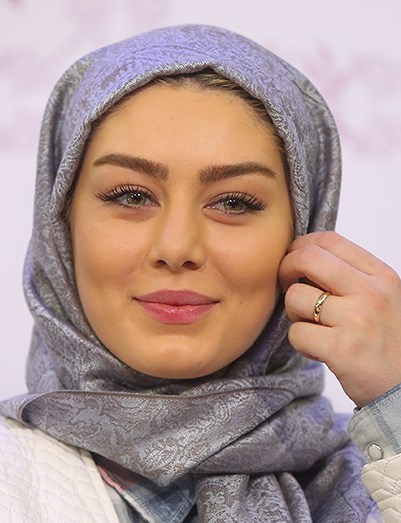
- Ghoreishi in 2016
- Born: 27 December 1987 (age 38); Tehran, Iran
- Occupation: Actress
- Years active: 2009–2021
- Spouse: Mehran Akhavan Zakeri (m. 2004–2009)

Sahar Ghoreishi (Persian: سحر قریشی; born 27 December 1987) is an Iranian actress. She began her acting career in 2009 with a role in the film Laj-o-Laj Bazi and gained prominence that same year for her performance in the television series Delnavazan.

== Personal life ==
Sahar Ghoreishi was born in Tehran. She married Mehran Akhavan Zakeri in 2004; they divorced in 2009. She had short-term relationships with Iranian footballer Mehdi Taremi and singer Amir Tataloo.

== Career ==
Ghoreishi began her career performing a role in the television show Laj-o-Laj Bazi (English: Pertinacity) (2009), and she rose to fame among Iranians by starring in the TV series Delnavazan. She is also active in brand endorsement and modelling.

== Controversies ==
=== Photo Controversy ===
In 2019, images circulated on social media suggesting a close relationship between Sahar Ghoreishi and Mehdi Taremi. Amid growing speculation and reactions, both parties expressed regret over the release of the images and described their relationship as friendly.

=== Views on Women Attending Sports Stadiums ===
In December 2017, Ghoreishi stated in an interview that she opposed women attending sports stadiums, saying she felt “disturbed” by the presence of men around her. Previously, she had attended a Persepolis vs. Al-Hilal match at the Zayed Sports City Stadium in Abu Dhabi, with photos of her at the event shared online. Her remarks sparked widespread criticism, particularly on social media. Public figures such as Mahnaz Afshar, Masih Alinejad, and Salome Seyednia responded to her comments. In a subsequent interview, Ghoreishi clarified that her stance on women attending stadiums was a personal opinion shared with her fans, citing “lack of safety for women in stadiums” as her reason.

=== Instagram Account Hack ===
In late October 2016, Ghoreishi’s Instagram account, with 4.4 million followers, was hacked. For several hours, an image of the Saudi Arabian king and the country’s flag was posted on her page.

=== Mistreatment of a Street Cleaner ===
On April 22, 2020, a video surfaced showing Ghoreishi laughing near a municipal street cleaner, telling her friends, "I matched my outfit with him." After the worker reacted by saying, "Go, lady," Ghoreishi remarked to her friends, "All I needed was for him to tell me to go."

The footage quickly went viral, triggering widespread public backlash. Majid Farahani, a member of the Tehran City Council, publicly demanded an apology, stating that if none was offered, he would pursue a formal legal complaint against Ghoreishi through the municipality's legal department.

Actor Sam Derakhshani criticized Ghoreishi’s actions on Instagram, labeling her among “pseudo-artists” who rose in Iran’s cinema through connections. He wrote, “The story starts with pseudo-artists who, through their deals, rise to fame and develop a delusion of being true artists… Half the insults the artistic community receives are due to the ignorance of people like you.”

In response to the criticism, Ghoreishi posted on Instagram, “I proudly say I was born into a family from this very class, and I will never forget my past.” She added:

“For a while now, I’ve been sensitive to the word ‘go’! It’s that simple, because for a long time, my friends and those around me have been advising me to leave Iran. When that honorable street cleaner told me ‘go,’ it felt like a message from nature itself telling me to leave. That dear street cleaner didn’t recognize me at all, and I swear I never intended to insult him. This was nothing but a small misunderstanding. In the end, what could be more wonderful than me wearing the honorable uniform of a street cleaner one day and experiencing the thrilling feeling of standing beside this hardworking and dignified group? Wearing a street cleaner’s uniform isn’t a punishment or a court ruling; to me, it’s a great honor and a symbol of nobility and integrity.”

=== Relationship with Amir Tataloo ===
In 2021, images shared on social media suggesting Ghoreishi’s migration to Turkey and an emotional relationship with Amir Tataloo fueled further controversies. Both Ghoreishi and Tataloo confirmed their relationship in various ways. Analysts have linked this relationship to the promotion of overseas betting networks, suggesting that the controversy was orchestrated to increase traffic and profits for gambling websites.

== Filmography ==
Title	Persian title	Year	Network	Director
Women Are Angels 2	Zanha Fereshtehand 2	2020	Movie	Arash Moayerian
Dancing on the glass	Raghs Rooi é Shisheh	2019	TV series	Mahdi Golestaneh
Let Mitra sleep	Begozarid Mitra Bekhabad	2017	Movie	Arash Sanjabi
Frivolous	As-O-Pas	2016	Movie	Arash Moayerian
Lovebulance	Eshqulans	2016	Movie	Mohsen Mahini
Unskilled Laborer Wanted	Kargar-e Sade Niaz Mandim	2016	Movie	Manouchehr Hadi
Lolipop	Abnabat Choubi	2016	Movie	Mohammad Hossein Farah Bakhsh
Disgrace / Infamy	Rosvaei 2	2016	Movie	Masoud Deh Namaki
Sharmin and Me	Man-o Sharmin	2015	Movie	‌Bijan Shir Marz
Hail and Sun	Tagarg va Aftab	2014	Movie	Reza Karimi
Darya Kenar	Darya Kenar	2014	Movie	Arash Moayerian
Towards Freedom	Towards Freedom	2014	Movie	Mehrshad Karkhani
Two Friends	Do Doust	2013	Movie	Mohammad Banki
Chance, Love, Accident	Shans, Eshgh, Tasadof	2013	Movie	Arash Moayerian
Night Shift	Shift-e Shab	2013	Movie	Niki Karimi
Three Strangers in the Unknown Land	Se Bigane Dar Sarzamine Nashenakhte	2013	Movie	Mahdi Mazloumi
Fireworks	Atish Bazi	2012	Movie	Bahman Goudarzi
What Men Do not Know About Women	Anche Mardan Darbareye Zanan Nemidanand	2012	Movie	Ghorban Mohammadpoor
Five Star	Panj Setare	2012	Movie	Mahshid Afsharzadeh
A Life of Both Love and Disloyalty	Roozegare Eshgh va Khianat	2012	Movie	Rouhollah Shamghadri
Nazain	Nazanin	2011	Movie	Mahdi Golestaneh
Woman, Man, Life	Zan, Mard, Zendegi	2011	Movie	Mahdi Vadadi
Ekbatan	Ekbatan	2011	Movie	Mehrshad Karkhani
Together Again	Dobare Baham	2010	Movie	Roozbeh Heydari
Rush Hour	Saat Sholoughi	2010	Movie	Arash Moayerian
Guidance Patrol	Gasht-e Ershad	2010	Movie	Saeed Soheili
Private – Tehran	Mahramane Tehran	2009	Movie	Mahdi Fiouzi
It's calm and Quiet	Hamechi Aroome	2009	Movie	Mostafa Mansouryar
Pertinacity	Laj-o-Laj Bazi	2008	Movie	Sayyed Mahdi Borgheyi
Aspirin	Aspirin	2016	TV series	Farhad Najafi
A Wolf-Like Man	Mardi Shabihe Gorg	2014	TV series	Ashkan Shapouri
Heads or Tails	Shir ya Khat	2013	TV series	Farshad Arj
Lavasan Guys	Bache Haye Lavasan	2012	TV series	Ahmad Tavakoli
Three Parallel Lines	Se Khate Movazi	2011	TV series	Mohsen Afshani
Wood Ladder	Nardeban Choubi	2011	TV series	Farshad Arj
Narmak	Narmak, Tehran Pars	2011	TV series	Saleh Deldam
I feel Good	Hale Man Khoub Ast	2010	TV series	Behrouz Khalaj
The Sicilians	Sisili Ha	2010	TV series	Rouhollah Hosseini
Maybe it happens to you	Shayad Baraye Shoma Ham Etefagh Bioftad (1)	2011	National TV show	Mahmoud Moazami
Maybe it happens to you	Shayad Baraye Shoma Ham Etefagh Bioftad (2)	2010	National TV show	Ahmad Moazami
The Orphic	Delnavazan	2009	National TV show	Hossein Soheilizadeh
