= Pardis Pourabedini =

Iranian actress (born 2000)

- پردیس پورعابدینی
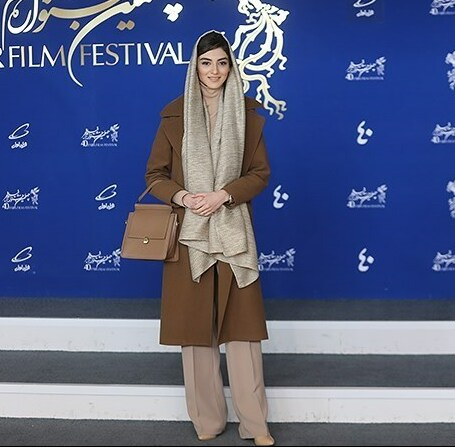
- Pourabedini at the 2022 Fajr Film Festival
- Born: 10 April 2000 (age 26); Tehran, Iran
- Occupation: Actress
- Years active: 2019–present
- Spouse: Amir Hossein Mousavi (m.)

Pardis Pourabedini (Persian: پردیس پورعابدینی; born April 10, 2000) is an Iranian actress. She is best known for her leading roles as Razieh Moghaddam in Blue Blood (2020–2021) and as Fereshteh Khadem in Fereshteh's Sin (2023–2024) for which she earned two Hafez Award nominations.

Pourabedini won the Crystal Simorgh for Best Actress at the 41st Fajr International Film Festival for her performance in the 2023 war film Unknown.

== Early life ==
Pardis Pourabedini was born on April 10, 2000, in Tehran, Iran. She has two sisters and is the middle child. Her elder sister is a doctor. Her mother is a hairdresser and her father, Babak Pourabedini, is the CEO of Sofar Company.

== Personal life ==
Pourabedini married actor Amir Hossein Mousavi on an unknown date. They appeared together for the first time after their marriage on July 25, 2024, at the premier of the 6 in the Morning film.

== Filmography ==
=== Film ===
Year	Title	Role	Director	Notes	Ref.
2022	Killing a Traitor	Today's West's reporter	Masoud Kimiai	Cameo	
2022	Motherless	Mahrouz	Morteza Fatemi		
2023	Unknown	Kazhal	Mohammad Hossein Latifi		
2023	In the Form of Love		Siavash As'adi		
2026	Black Wine		Ebrahim Ebrahimian		

=== Web ===
Year	Title	Role	Director	Platform	Notes	Ref.
2020–2021	Blue Blood	Razieh Moghaddam / Maneli	Behrang Tofighi	Filimo, Namava	Main role; 29 episodes	
2020–2021	The Smell of Blood	Herself	Vahid Saeedi	Filimo, Namava	Documentary; 11 episodes	
2021	The Restless Heart	Narrator	Amir Hossein Arsin	Filimo	Special; 10 episodes	
2023–2024	Fereshteh's Sin	Fereshteh Khadem	Hamed Angha	Filimo	Main role; 18 episodes	
2026	The Red and the Black		Ida Panahandeh	Filimo	Main role	
TBA	Leily and Majnun		Hamid Reza Ghorbani		Main role	

=== Television ===
Year	Title	Role	Director	Network	Notes	Ref(s)
2022	Seven	Herself	Mojtaba Amini	IRIB TV3	Episode: "6.17"	

== Theatre ==
Year	Title	Role	Playwright	Director	Stage	Ref.
2019	It Might Happen to You Too		Saeed Naeemipour	Maryam Barzegar	Nofel Loshato Theater	
2019	Friday Noon Story	Azadeh	Mohammad Mosavat	Nasim Adabi	Sepand Theater, Nofel Loshato Theater	

== Awards and nominations ==
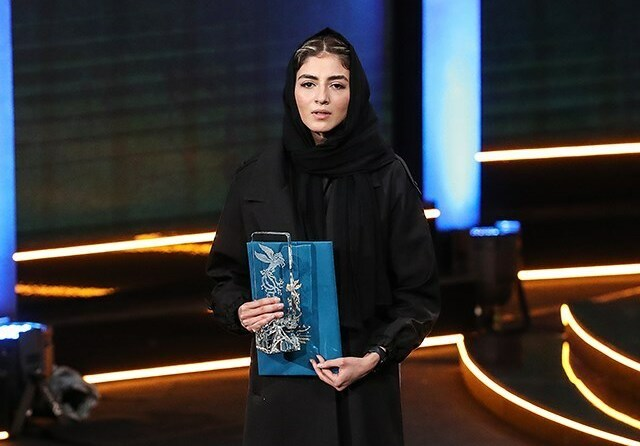
Pourabedini holding the Crystal Simorgh for Best Actress which she won for her role in Unknown at the 41st Fajr International Film Festival, on February 11, 2023.

Name of the award ceremony, year presented, category, nominee of the award, and the result of the nomination
Award	Year	Category	Nominated work	Result	Ref.
Fajr International Film Festival	2023	Best Actress in a Leading Role	Unknown	Won	
Hafez Awards	2021	Best Actress – Television Series Drama	Blue Blood	Nominated	
Hafez Awards	2024	Best Actress – Television Series Drama	Fereshteh's Sin	Nominated	
Resistance International Film Festival	2023	Best Actress	Unknown	Nominated	

== See also ==
- Iranian women
- Iranian cinema
