= Parvaneh Soltani =

Iranian playwright and actress

- Born: 12 October 1961; Tehran, Iran
- Education: London College of Printing
- Occupations: Playwright; Theatre director Actress

Parvaneh Soltani (born October 12, 1961) is an Iranian playwright, theatre director, and actress.

== Background ==
Soltani's father was an activist, and her mother was a poet and homemaker. She grew up in a poetry and political household that adored the left-wing of Iran, its ideologies and poetry. Through her father's acceptance of left-wing ideologies came an acceptance of liberal feminism. Her father encouraged his daughters to "be a free woman".

She obtained a Bachelor of Arts in theatre at Dramatic University in Tehran.

=== Life and work in the West ===
Soltani left Iran in 1985 because of the political situation: it was around this time that the Iranian Revolution occurred. As an effect of the political restructuring after the revolution, she came to London and began studying Media. Eventually, she attended the London College of Printing to study MA in Film. In London, she contributed to radio and magazines in Europe to find her voice. In 1990, she began to work with Iraj Janatie Ataie, a playwright and theatre director, in an epic story called another Roastam, another Esfandiyar with Behrooz Vosooghi, the Iranian co-star. They have performed that play in numerous countries, including England, most European cities, Canada and the United States. In 2000, she formed the Nina Theatre Company in London. Since then, she has written, directed, and performed many plays which been performed in London, Canada, and several European cities. In 2000, she also joined the Artists in Exile company based in London.

The first mature play she adapted, performed, and directed herself was A Woman Alone. She then wrote a successful play based on true stories of political prisoners in Iran following the revolution. Her work refers to Islamic society's social, cultural, and religious codes and the complexity of certain oppositions, such as man and woman. The plight of Iranian women is the subject she usually focuses on. She has also made more narrative one-woman shows in the theatre, such as her work, Forugh Farokhzad in the garden of memories.

The work of Soltani addresses the social, political, and psychological dimensions of women's experience in contemporary societies. Although Parvaneh actively resists stereotypical representations of Islam, her artistic objectives are not explicitly polemical. Rather, her work recognizes the complex intellectual and religious forces shaping the identity of Muslim women throughout the world. She also directed and acted in short films like Stoning, A passion for life, and Land legs. While she lives in London, she addresses a global audience with her work; for example, Fear of Separation was symbolic of the grief, anxiety, and pain of those women who are scared of the separation. As time progressed and the Islamic regime of Iran became more intrusive and oppressive, her work became boldly political and subversively critical against it; for example, Once upon a time in my country, Iran, and Mr, Bin Laden Journeys and Women.

She seeks to, according to an article in New Left Review and Iran Bulitan Journal, women are a lost link in Iranian cinema. Her current theatre work continues to express the philosophical and complex levels of intellectual abstraction.

Soltani was profiled on her website Art and Heart expression in March 2005. In July 2009, she created her dance theatre Nada's Story to protest the 2009 Iranian presidential election.

== Theatre ==
- 1979 Joan Dark - actor
- 1980 Exception and Rules - actor
- 1981 Round Heads and Sharp Heads - actor
- 1982 Can't Pay, Don't Pay - assistant director
- 1987 Terror and Misery of the Third Reich - director
- 1991 Rostam and Esfandiar at Lyric Studio - actor
- 1994 Arabian Nights - actor
- 1995 Artists Wives - director
- 1996 Butterfly in Fist - actor
- 1997 Guilty for Loving - writer, director
- 1999 An Interview with “Eva” - director, actor
- 2000 Islamic Fashion Show at Paris 2000 Theatre - writer, director, actor
- 2000 A Woman Alone - director, actor
- 2001 Waiting - actor
- 2001 A Modern Woman at 2000 Dance Theatre - writer, director, actor
- 2002 Once Upon a Time in My Country - writer, director, actor
- 2003 Artists in Exile - actor
- 2003 A Molah at a Secret Place - writer, director, actor
- 2004 Nikoo's Story - director, actor
- 2004 Secret Love Written - director, actor
- 2005 Forough in the Garden's of Memories - actor
- 2006 The Donkey and a Couple - writer, director, actor
- 2008 Mr Bin's Journey - writer, director, actor
- 2009 Neda's Story - writer, director, actor
- 2010 Zeal in Exile - actor
- 2011 City of Stories - writer, director
- 2012 Nzaly Theater - writer, director
- 2014 Miss Butterfly - writer, director

== Film ==
- 1999 A Passion for Life - writer, director
- 2003 Land Legs - actor
