= Sattar Oraki =

Iranian composer

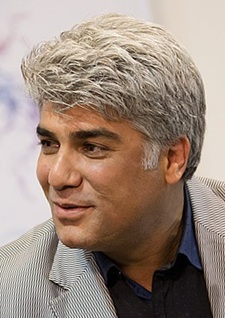
- Oraki at the Fajr International Film Festival 2018
- Born: 5 May 1969 (age 57); Ahvaz, Khuzestan, Iran
- Occupation: Composer
- Years active: 2007–present
- Known for: A Separation; The Salesman

Sattar Oraki (Persian: ستار اورکی), (born 5 May 1969 in Ahvaz) is an Iranian composer. He has scored Academy Award-winning movies such as A Separation and The Salesman. Oraki is a member of the Academy of Motion Picture Arts and Sciences.

== Filmography ==
- Tooba, 2024
- The Strait 2023
- Killing a Traitor 2022
- Aghazadeh (TV series) 2020
- Privacy 2017
- Ghahreman-e akhar (Documentary) 2017
- The Elephant King 2017
- I Motherhood 2017
- Fasl-e Narges 2017
- Vilaieha 2017
- Mermaid 2016
- The Salesman 2016
- Ferris wheel 2016
- A House on 41st Street 2016
- Se Mahi (TV Movie) 2015
- Dorane Asheghi 2015
- Panj Setareh 2014
- Towards Freedom 2014
- A House Beside Clouds 2014
- Cherknevis (Video) 2014
- Az Iran, yek jodaee (Documentary) 2013
- Trapped (2013 film) 2013
- Maybe There 2013
- Esterdad 2013
- Ekbatan 2012
- Yek satr vagheiat 2012
- Shabake 2012
- Kooche melli 2011
- Nadarha 2011
- A Separation 2011
- Empty Paper Bag (Short) 2010
- Nasepas 2010
- Whatever God Wants 2010
- The Strangers 2009
- Rismaneh baz 2008
- Sang, kaghaz, gheichi 2007

== Composing for singers ==
- Salar Aghili For the Constitutional Days
- Salar Aghili For the song of the mother
- Salar Aghili as For the song endless way
- Reza Yazdani For your wife song

== Awards ==
- honorary diploma (Celebration of critics and authors 2017)
- Statue of the best music video (Iranian Cinema Celebration 2013)
- Simorgh Candidate for Fajr Film Festival 2016
- Simorgh Candidate for Fajr Film Festival 2014
- Simorgh Candidate for Fajr Film Festival 2013
