= Ali Zand Vakili =

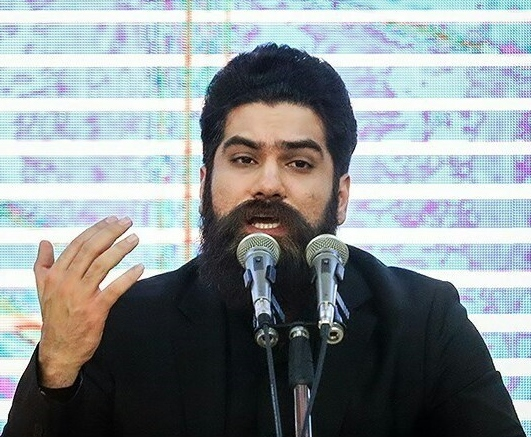
- Occupation: Singer
- Musical career
- Genres: Persian pop; Jazz fusion
- Instruments: Vocals; guitar; piano; keyboard
- Years active: 2003–present

Ali Zand Vakili (Persian: علی زند وکیلی) is an Iranian singer, composer, and music teacher. He began his artistic career in music as a child by singing and playing the tombak. In 1998, after the establishment of Shiraz Music Conservatory, he was one of its first entrants. After studying at Shiraz Music Conservatory for three years and learning santur, piano and tombak in 2002, he entered Tehran Conservatory of Music and graduated from there. He went on to read the piece and a few years later became famous with the release of the lullaby piece. Zand Vakili is currently a music expert.

== Discography ==
=== Albums ===
- In the Middle of Darkness – 2012 (with Babak Ghasali)
- Crossing May – 2013 (with artist Arash Pourrahimian)
- Companion of Pain – 2014
- Remembering the Color of Today – 2015
- Watch Saba – 2015
- Because Water Dance – 2016
- Unrepeatable Dream – 2016
- Neffe Beehnood Zandvakili

=== Singles ===
- "Lullaby" composed by Alireza Afkari
- "Yellow Season" composed by Alireza Afkari
- "April Tour"
- "Sattarkhan" kamancheh Sina Alam and Sahab Alam
- "Bahar Shiraz"
- "Jealous City"
- "The Name of the Lions"
- "The Cruel World"
- "Blue Scarf"
- "Red Flower"
- "Padre"
- "Night Road"
- "Gone with the Wind"
- "The Dude"
- "Geranium Flowers"
- "Believe Me"
- "Last Dream" with Sina Alam and Sahab Alam
- "The Last Song" for the Aghazadeh series, composed by Alireza Afkari
- "Season of Distress" for Aghazadeh series, composed by Alireza Afkari
- "Mask" for Aghazadeh series, composed by Alireza Afkari
- "My Appointment" composed by Mohammad Zandukili and written by Hossein Ghiasi
- "Sanam"

== Awards ==
- Winner of the Golden Statue for the best composite and experimental piece of music outside the album, selected by the people from the third annual celebration of our music for the piece "Tarshro" composed by Darkoob and sung by Ali Zand Vakili.
- Winner of the Golden Statue of the best piece of fusion and experimental music chosen by the people for the piece "Lullaby" from our fourth annual music festival

Zand Vakili said after receiving his award: "I am happy that this piece was able to receive the award for the best piece with the efforts of Alireza Afkari, Afshin Moghadam, Mahmoud Shobiri, Sepehr Sahebi and Saeed Zamani."

- Winner of the Golden Statue of the best piece of fusion and experimental music from the people's point of view for the piece "Believe Me" from fifth annual music festival

"Thank you to the composer, songwriter and arranger," Zand Vakili said after receiving the award. In memory of my father, be the child of art, not the child of the father.
