= Negin Kianfar =

Iranian film director and actor (born 1969)

- نگین کیانفر
- Born: 1969 (age 56–57); Tehran, Iran
- Occupations: Film director, voice artist

Negin Kianfar (Persian: نگین کیانفر, born 1969) is an Iranian director, painter and dubbing voice actress. She does voice-over for foreign films, Hollywood productions and television series in Persian.

== Filmography ==
- The Birthday (Documentary film) (co-Director)
- 1 Hour- 99 Years (Documentary film) (co-director)
- Eve & Adam (Documentary film) (director)
- A New Day (Documentary film) (director)
- The Deep Dark Blue (Documentary film) (director)

=== Samples of dubbing ===
- The Deer Hunter - Linda (Meryl Streep)
- Kramer vs. Kramer - Joanna Kramer (Meryl Streep)
- Pulp Fiction - Mia Wallace (Uma Thurman)
- Spider-Man - Mary Jane Watson (Kirsten Dunst)
- Bad Boys - (Téa Leoni)
- The Devil's Advocate - (Charlize Theron)
- The Astronaut's Wife - (Charlize Theron)
- Prometheus - (Charlize Theron)
- All Saints - (Georgie Parker) TV Series
