= Aghazadeh =

Iranian term for children of elite families

Aghazadeh (Persian: آقازاده, lit. 'born to Agha or noble-born') (Kurdish: آقازاده) is a term that entered the colloquialism in Iran and Kurdistan region in the 1990s to describe the children of elite who emerge as the men of means and influence, usually in a way that resembles familial nepotism and corruption. This includes utilization of the positions within the hierarchy to gain inside information and preferential status which results in replication of wealth and power across generations and means "fewer top positions are available to talented people without family connections".

The phenomenon is exemplified with family members of high-ranking officials in Iran such as Hashemi Rafsanjani, Nategh Nouri and Vaez Tabasi. In the Kurdistan Region its children of high-ranking Kurdish government, KDP and PUK officials.

In 2017, Zhen-e Khoob (Persian: ژن خوب meaning good genes), a new term was coined and became synonymous with Aghazadehs and "the privileges they enjoy". The word Aghazadeh, which is used as a surname in Iran and Azerbaijan, is made up of two words Agha and Zadeh, where Agha is an Azerbaijani word meaning sir and the suffix zadeh means child. Respected people, usually merchants, were labeled Agha by people and as such their children became the bearers of Aghazadeh as their surname in order to point out that they were the children of the Agha.

== See also ==
- Nepotism
- Nepo baby
- Political families
- Ingroup bias
- Hereditary politicians
