= Baduk (film) =

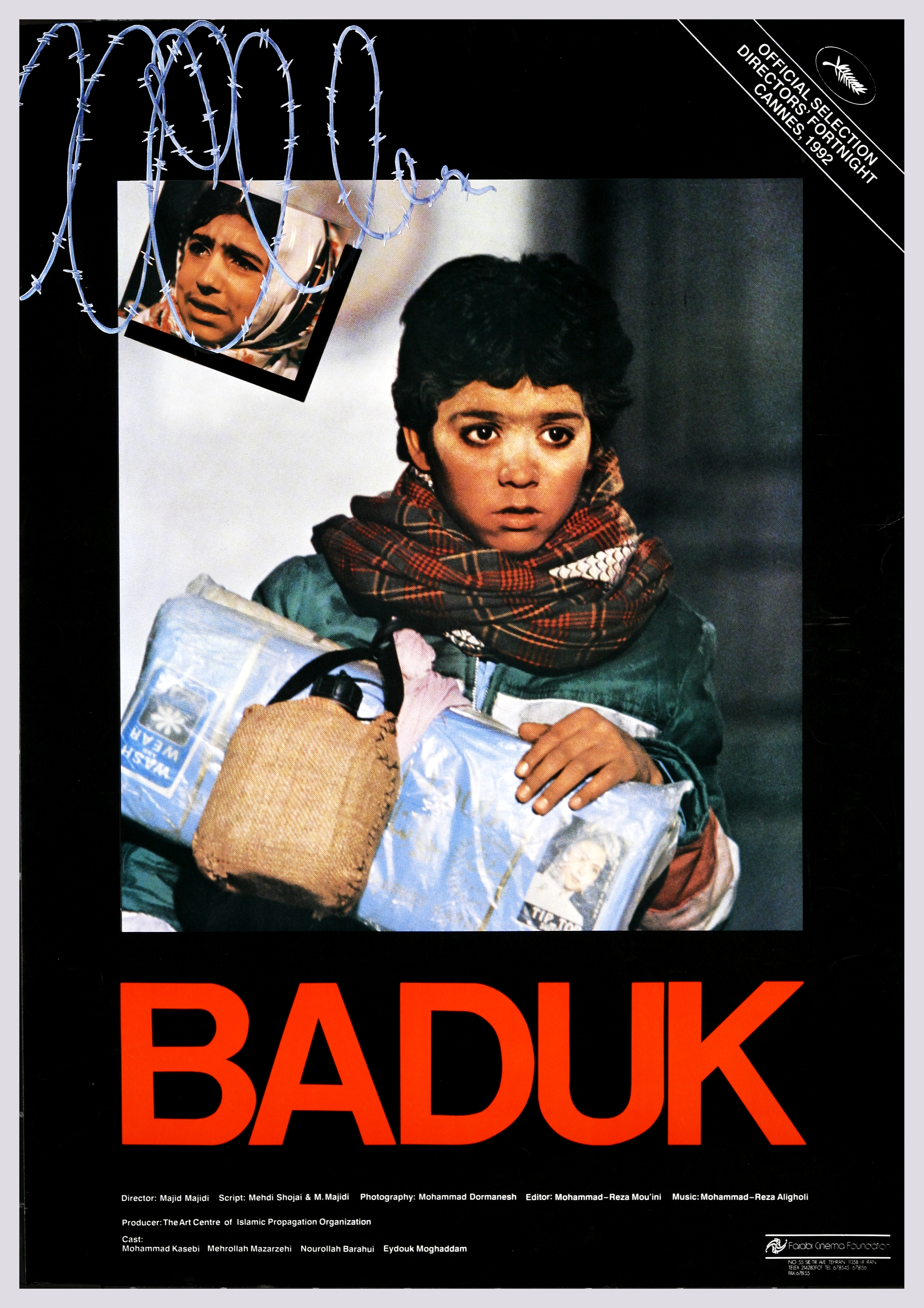
- English-language theatrical poster
- Directed by: Majid Majidi
- Written by: Seyed Mehdi Shojai
- Produced by: Ardashir Iran-Nezhad Islamic Propagation Organization
- Starring: Mohammad Kasebi, Mehrolah Mararzehi, Norahmad Barahoi, Hossein Haijar
- Distributed by: Ace Deuce Entertainment (Japan)
- Release date: January 1, 1992 (Iran)
- Running time: 90 min.
- Languages: Persian, Dari

Baduk (Persian: بدوک) is a 1992 Iranian film. It was the debut feature of director Majid Majidi. The film deals with child slavery. The Persian term "baduk" refers to people, often children hired against their will, who carry smuggled merchandise from the border on foot.

== Synopsis ==
Jafar and his sister Jamal are separated from their mother after their father is killed in a well cave-in. While walking along the road, the siblings are kidnapped and sold into slavery. Jamal is dressed in fancy silks, destined to be the playmate of a Saudi prince. Jafar is drafted into a band of child baduki, bringing goods across the Pakistan-Iran border. Jafar escapes his captors, and engages the help of Noredin, a Pakistani baduk he has befriended. Together they work to free Jafar's sister, Jamal. The movie ends with a doomed act of bravery on the part of Jafar.

== Background and critical response ==
The film was shot in Sistan and Baluchestan, an arid province in southeast Iran. Baduk premiered in January 1992, and was shown that February at the Tehran Fajr Film Festival. It was screened at the Director's Fortnight at Cannes in 1992, where it was considered a bold film from the Islamic Republic of Iran. Director Majidi ran into censorship problems after making this film.

== Awards ==
- Best New Film, 10th Annual Fajr Film Festival
- Best Screen Play, 10th Annual Fajr Film Festival

== Sources ==
- Sons Against Fathers. Article by Massoud Mehrabi
- Synopsis from Allmovie, New York Times
- Synopsis, Associação Brasileira Mostra Internacional de Cinema
- International Festival of Films for Children and Young Adults, Iran
