= Energy Hastei =

Single by Amir Tataloo
- Written: Amir Tataloo
- Released: 24 February 2015
- Genre: Rap Farsi, R&B
- Length: 3:19
- Label: Owj Arts and Media Organization
- Songwriter(s): Amir Tataloo
- Producer(s): Ardeshir Ahmadi

"Energy Hastei" (Persian: انرژی هسته‌ای) is a song by Iranian singer and songwriter Amir Tataloo, which was released in July 2015, at the same time as the Iran nuclear talks with the 5+1. The video clip "Nuclear Energy" is directed by Ardeshir Ahmadi and made with the support of the police of the Islamic Republic of Iran, the Navy of the Army of the Islamic Republic of Iran and the Delsada Cultural and Artistic Group and the Nasr Internet Network.

This video was released after a comprehensive agreement between Iran and the 5+1 group. The United States has repeatedly threatened Iran with destroying its nuclear program. The Israeli threats continued after the agreement between Iran and the P5 + 1, which caused more attention to this video in the domestic and foreign media. This video had the cooperation of the Navy of the Army of the Islamic Republic of Iran in its production. This music video received a lot of attention and in a short time became the top of Google searches and was reflected in domestic and foreign media. To the extent that reputable publications such as Time and Christian Science Monitor covered it. Israeli television station I24news and the Asian media are also covering the video.

This video was filmed in Manjil and other parts on the Damavand destroyer in the fourth district of Najaf, Bandar Anzali, and was presented with English subtitles, in which Iran's right to access nuclear energy as well as the name of the Persian Gulf were mentioned.

According to The Guardian, Amir Hossein Maghsoudloo, nicknamed Amir Tataloo, has created a storm with this clip. After this clip, he received a gift from the Navy of the Army of the Islamic Republic of Iran, which he posted a picture of on his Instagram.

Ministry of Guidance spokesman Hussein Noshabadi said his ministry was completely unaware of the matter: "The Ministry of Guidance is unaware of this issue and it was done without coordination, because Maghsoudloo does not have a license not only to publish this news, but also to do business. I do not know that the Navy has entrusted him with such a matter or even ordered him to build it. "But it may be for a force within which cultural and ideological officials must respond, and military officials must address the issue, because if a permit was to be issued, they would have had to coordinate with the Ministry of Guidance".

According to Ardeshir Ahmadi, Owj Arts and Media Organization was the producer of this video.
