= Laya Zanganeh =

Iranian actress

Laya Zangeneh
- لعیا زنگنه
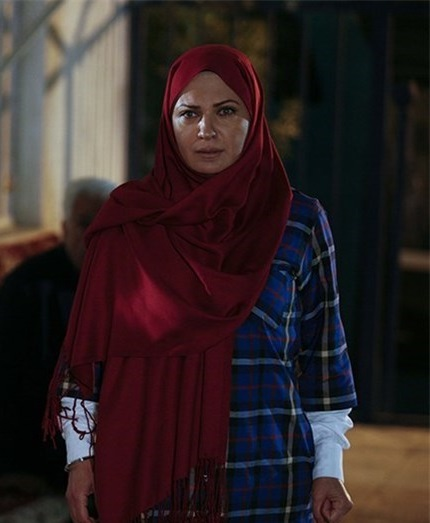
- Born: 23 September 1965 (age 60); Tehran, Iran
- Education: Tehran University of Art - Theatre
- Occupation: Actress
- Years active: 1992–present

Laya Zanganeh (Persian: لعیا زنگنه; born 23 September 1965) is an Iranian theater and film actress. She got her Bachelor of Arts from college of Dramatic Arts in Tehran. She became famous after playing in the Under Your Protection series at 1994–1995.

== Career ==
In 1992, she began professional theatre acting. The actor Amin Tarokh discovered her acting talent. Mohammad-Ali Keshavarz and Sorayya Qasemi guided her to act in cinema and television. Her debut movie was 'The Secret of Mina' (1996), directed by Abbas Rafei.

Zanganeh has appeared in several movies such as:

- 'Lean on the Wind' (1999)
- 'Seven Songs' (2001)
- 'Fever' (2003)
- 'The Boss' (2006)
- 'Quiet Streets' (2010)
- 'Self-Harm' (2011)
- 'Private Life' (2011)
- 'Lovers Die Standing' (2013)

She has also taken parts in various TV series, including:

- 'Under Your Protection' (1994-1995)
- 'In My Heart' (1997-1998)
- 'Born Again' (1999)
- 'Zero Degree Turn' (2007)
- 'Coma' (2007)
- 'Tell the Truth' (2012)
- 'Like a Mother' (2013)
- 'Aghazadeh (TV series)' (2020)

== Filmography ==
=== Series ===
Year	Title	Role	Network
1994-95	Under Your Protection	Maryam Afshar	IRIB TV2
1997-98	In My Heart		IRIB TV3
1999	Born Again	Daryoush Farhang	IRIB TV5
2001	Love Rain		IRIB TV5
2007	Zero Degree Turn	Zinatol-Molouk Jahanbani	IRIB TV1
2007	Coma		IRIB TV1
2012	Tell the Truth		IRIB TV1
2013	Like a Mother	Rana	IRIB TV3
2013	Long sleep	Saba	IRIB TV3
2015	Tehran rooftop	Anousheh	IRIB TV1
2016	We relaxed	Mahan	IRIB TV2
2018	Father	Sharifeh	IRIB TV2

=== Film ===
Year	Title	Role
1995	Secret Mina	
1998	Relying on the Wind	
1999	Color of Night	Zohre
1999	Intrigued	
2000	Seven songs	
2000	Intruder	
2002	Fever	
2006	President	Fereshteh
2008	Shirin	
2010	Quiet streets	
2010	Mass	Aba jan
2011	Self-mutilation	
2012	Private life	
2012	Standing love die	
2015	This woman deserves wants	
2016	Farm killer	
2017	Women Who Run With Wolves	

== TV movie ==
- Another name for love (A. Nvrvzpvr, 2011-2012)
- Black Scales (M. Ranger, 2012)
- Risen Love (J. Afshar, 2012)
- Whisper (M Water Prevert, 2011)
- Road Crime (J unbelief, 2007
