= Majid Majidi =

Iranian film director

- مجید مجیدی
- Majidi in 2026
- Born: Talesh, Iran
- Occupations: Director, producer, screenwriter
- Years active: 1981–present
- Notable work: Children of Heaven; The Color of Paradise; Baran; The Song of Sparrows; Muhammad: The Messenger of God
- Children: 2
- Website: www.cinemajidi.com

Majid Majidi (Persian: مجید مجیدی, romanized: Majīd Majīdī; born 17 April 1959) is an Iranian filmmaker and producer. His films often feature child or adolescent protagonists; explore themes such as childhood innocence, family bonds, poverty, social issues, and solidarity; and are characterized by a humanistic sensibility. His important films include Children of Heaven (1997), The Color of Paradise (1999), Baran (2001) and The Song of Sparrows (2008). Children of Heaven was nominated for the Academy Award for Best International Feature Film. More recently, Majidi directed Muhammad: The Messenger of God (2015), an epic film dealing with the childhood of the Islamic prophet Muhammad, whose face is obscured and never shown onscreen.

== Biography ==
Born in a Persian middle-class family, he grew up in Tehran and at the age of 14 he started acting in amateur theater groups. He then studied at the Institute of Dramatic Arts in Tehran.

After the Iranian Revolution in 1979, his interest in cinema brought him to act in various films, most notably Mohsen Makhmalbaf's Boycott in 1985.

In 1997, Majidi directed Children of Heaven, which was nominated to receive the Academy Award for Best Foreign Language Film. Though it lost to the Italian film Life Is Beautiful by Roberto Benigni, Children of Heaven is the first Iranian film to have been nominated by the academy.

Majidi has directed several other feature films since Children of Heaven: The Color of Paradise in 2000, Baran in 2001, and The Willow Tree in 2005 (alternative English title One Life More). He also directed a feature-length documentary titled Barefoot to Herat which chronicles life in refugee camps and the city of Herat during and after the anti-Taliban offensive of 2001.

In 2008, Majidi's acclaimed film The Song of Sparrows was the opening film of the Visakhapatnam International Film Festival in India.

Majidi was one of five international film directors invited by the Beijing government to create a documentary short film to introduce the city of Beijing, in preparation for the 2008 Summer Olympics which was held in the Chinese capital; the project was titled "Vision Beijing".

Majidi pulled out of a Danish film festival in protest against the publication in Denmark of cartoons satirizing the Islamic prophet, Muhammad. He stated that he was withdrawing "to protest against insulting any religious belief or icon".

Majidi condemned the 2026 Israeli-American war of aggression against Iran and described it as "a battle between Good and Evil", where Israel "kills children" and Iran stands and resists "on behalf of all the oppressed and suffering people of the world", insisting that this war necessitates "the awakening and rising of free consciences around the world".

== Filmography ==
=== Feature films ===
Year	English Title	Original Title	Notes
1992	Baduk	بدوک	Debut feature
1996	The Father	پدر	
1997	Children of Heaven	بچه‌های آسمان	
1999	The Color of Paradise	رنگ خدا	
2001	Baran	باران	
2005	The Willow Tree	بید مجنون	
2008	The Song of Sparrows	آواز گنجشک‌ها	
2015	Muhammad: The Messenger of God	محمد رسول‌الله	
2017	Beyond the Clouds		Hindi-language debut
2020	Sun Children	خورشید	
2026	Midday Meal	غذای نیمروز	

=== Shorts/documentaries ===
1. Explosion (Enfejar) (1981) - documentary short
2. Hoodaj (1984) - short
3. Examination Day (Rooz-e Emtehan) (1988) - short
4. A Day with POWs (Yek Rooz Ba Asiran) (1989) - documentary short
5. The Last Village (Akhareen Abadi) (1993) - short
6. God Will Come (Khoda Miayad) (1996) - short
7. Barefoot to Herat (Pa berahneh ta Herat) (2002) - documentary
8. Olympics in the Camp (Olympik Tu Urdugah) (2003) - documentary short
9. Peace, Love, and Friendship (2007) - documentary short
10. Vision of Beijing (2008) - short
11. Rezae Rezvan (2007) - documentary
12. Najva ashorai (2008) - documentary

== Awards ==
- Grand Prix Des Amériques, 21st Montreal Film Festival, 1997
- Ecumenical Jury award, 21st Montreal Film Festival, 1997
- Nominated for Academy Awards for Best Foreign Film, 1998
- Grand Prix Des Amériques, 23rd Montreal Film Festival, 1999
- Grand Prix Des Amériques, 25th Montreal Film Festival, 2001
