= Amir Tataloo =

Iranian singer (born 1987)

- امیر تتلو
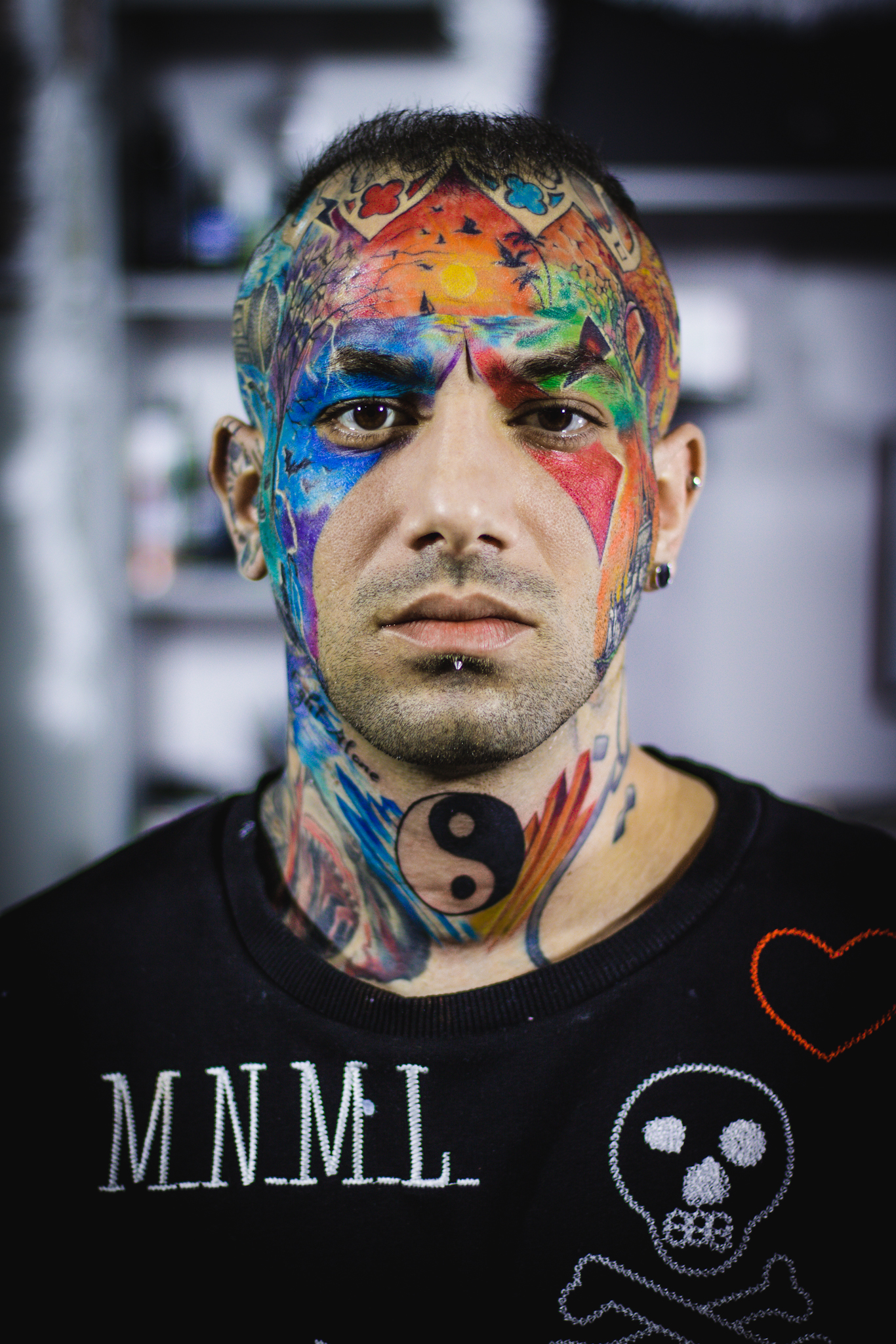
- Amir Tataloo in 2018
- Born: Amir Hossein Maghsoudloo; 21 September 1987 (age 39); Tehran, Iran
- Occupations: Singer; rapper; songwriter
- Known for: Singer,Rapper, songwriter,blogger
- Criminal status: Imprisoned in Iran
- Musical career
- Genres: Hip hop; R&B; Pop
- Instruments: Vocals; guitar; piano; keyboard
- Years active: 2003–2023
- Labels: TATALOO; Avang Music; Rap Farsi; Universal Music

Amir Hossein Maghsoudloo (Persian: امیرحسین مقصودلو; born 21 September 1987), known professionally as Amir Tataloo (Persian: امیر تتلو), is an Iranian singer, rapper and songwriter. He is one of Iran's most famous and controversial artists known for his full body tattoo and his frequent open dialogue toward politics and social aspects of Iran's younger generations. He is part of the first generation of the Iranian underground hip hop scene and also one of the first R&B singers in Persian.

His debut album, Zire Hamkaf, was released in 2011. Since then, he has released 21 albums. In 2021, Amir Tataloo released the album Fereshteh.

Tataloo was arrested several times when living in Iran by the Islamic Republic's authorities in 2016 and 2018 and spent months in prison. In 2018, he moved to Turkey and continued to further establish his successful career creating albums and big concerts in Turkey that otherwise were not allowed in Iran until 2023. Frustrated from living in exile, and after the expiry of his Iranian passport, he tried to leave Turkey to return to Tehran. In 2023, Turkish authorities first rejected his departure from Istanbul airport with an expired Iranian passport and later arrested him and handed over Tataloo to the Islamic Republic's police where he was immediately arrested with pending serious charges. On 19 January 2025, he was sentenced to death for blasphemy, which was upheld by the Supreme Court of Iran in May 2025.

== Early life ==
Amir Hossein Maghsoudloo was born in Majidieh, Tehran, Iran. His family is of Iranian Azerbaijani background, and he has four siblings.

Because of his father's occupation, Maghsoudloo spent part of his childhood in Rasht before returning to Tehran. During his teenage years, he worked while continuing his education due to his family's financial circumstances. Between the ages of 14 and 16, he worked in a carpentry workshop, and from 16 to 18, he worked in a grocery store.

After completing high school, Maghsoudloo began pursuing a career in music. His early activities developed during the growth of the Persian underground music scene, alongside several other emerging artists of that period.

== Music career ==
Maghsoudloo began his music career in 2003 by releasing songs through his personal blog, at a time when Persian hip hop and underground music in Iran were developing outside the country's official music industry. He initially worked as an underground musician, as he did not receive authorization from the Ministry of Culture and Islamic Guidance to officially release music in Iran.

Over the following years, Tataloo gained popularity through online platforms and social media, becoming one of the most recognized figures in the Iranian underground music scene. His work attracted a large following, particularly among younger audiences in Iran. Time described him as "a rapper with so many fans", while Radio Free Europe/Radio Liberty referred to him as an artist with a "strong fan base" among Iranian youth.

His musical style incorporates elements of pop, hip hop, rap, and contemporary R&B, creating a style that has been described as a combination of these genres.

He released a single, "Manam Yeki az un Yazdahtam" (I'm Also One of Those Eleven Players), for the Iranian National Football Team during the 2014 FIFA World Cup.

During the Iran/5+1 nuclear talks in Vienna in July 2015, he released Energy Hastei (Persian: انرژی هسته ای), a song supporting the Iranian nuclear program. The music video was produced on the Iranian navy ship Damavand. The song was the top trending Google search in Persian. This song became an instant controversy in Iran, mostly for the Iranian Reformists, who compared the song to Mohammadreza Shajarian's songs in support of Iranian protests in 2009.

In 2015 he attended the Tehran Peace Museum and was praised by the Iran-Iraq war veterans for his music video, Shohada (The Martyrs). He was introduced as the peace ambassador of the museum.

In 2018, after several arrests by the Iranian authorities and failing to get a music activity license from the Ministry of Culture and Islamic Guidance, Tataloo left Iran and immigrated to Turkey.

=== Tatality ===
Tatality was the name of Tataloo's 2012 album, which also is the name of his fan base. "Tatalities" mostly consist of Iranian youth who are dedicated to Tataloo. His fans may follow a lifestyle inspired by Tataloo's, including meditation, spiritual routines and vegan diet.

In 2016, after Iranian police arrested Tataloo, his fans protested before the Justice Court and demanded that authorities release him from prison. After his arrest, an online protest began against arresting artists due to their lyrics and lifestyle choices. They used various hashtags to pressure Iranian authorities to release him.

== Social media ==
Tataloo is one of the most popular yet controversial Iranian celebrities. He has a large fan base, as well as critics.

In 2019, Tataloo asked fans to break the record of the most commented post on Instagram, which was at the time 10 million comments. Fans broke the record with 18 million comments. After this, various political critics discussed the phenomenon and its impact on society. Academics such as Sadegh Zibakalam and Emaddedin Baghi wrote papers on this event.

Another record was broken in 2020, when Tataloo hosted a live broadcast with 626,000 viewers.

Among other Iranian singers, he has the most views on Spotify and YouTube.

== Personal life and arrest ==
Tataloo is vegan, and advocates vegan philosophy and lifestyle, asking his fans not to kill and eat animals. One of his many nicknames is Nature's Son.

On January 28, 2020, Tataloo was detained by Turkish police in Istanbul, with an Interpol red notice for him in effect. He was released on February 3, with Turkish police citing his detention as being for visa violations; in that time, an online petition had reached almost half a million signatures, aiming for his release.

In May 2020, Tataloo stirred controversy after he advocated for minors below the age of 16 to be able to get married and invited fans, minors at the time, to join his harem. On December 2, 2023, he claimed that he intended to return to Iran. He was finally handed over to the Iranian government on December 6, 2023 at the land border of Iran and Turkey, and was immediately arrested due to accusations and complaints such as corruption.

In January 2025, it was reported he had been sentenced to death in Iran for blasphemy, for insulting Islamic prophet Muhammad while Iran's Judiciary denied such claims. Tataloo's initial jail term of five years was increased after prosecutors raised objections to the sentence.

On 17 May 2025, the Supreme Court overturned the five-year sentence and instead imposed a sentence of death.

== Discography ==
=== Albums ===
Year	Album
2011	Zire Hamkaf
2013	Tatality
2014	Man
2015	Shomareh 6
2015	Mamnoo
2016	Shomareh 7
2017	Ghahreman
2017	Amir
2018	Sayeh
2018–2019	Jahanam
2018–2019	Barzakh
2019–2020	78
2020–2022	Sheytan
2021	Fereshteh
2022	Boht
2021–2022	Sahm
2022–2023	Cosmos
2023–2026	Yin Yang
2023–completing	Behesht
2026–completing	Full Moon

== See also ==
- Iranian hip hop
- Music of Iran
- Iranian underground music
- Freedom of expression in Iran
- Human rights in Iran
