= Kimiya Hosseini =

Iranian actress (born 2003)

Kimia Hosseini
- کیمیا حسینی
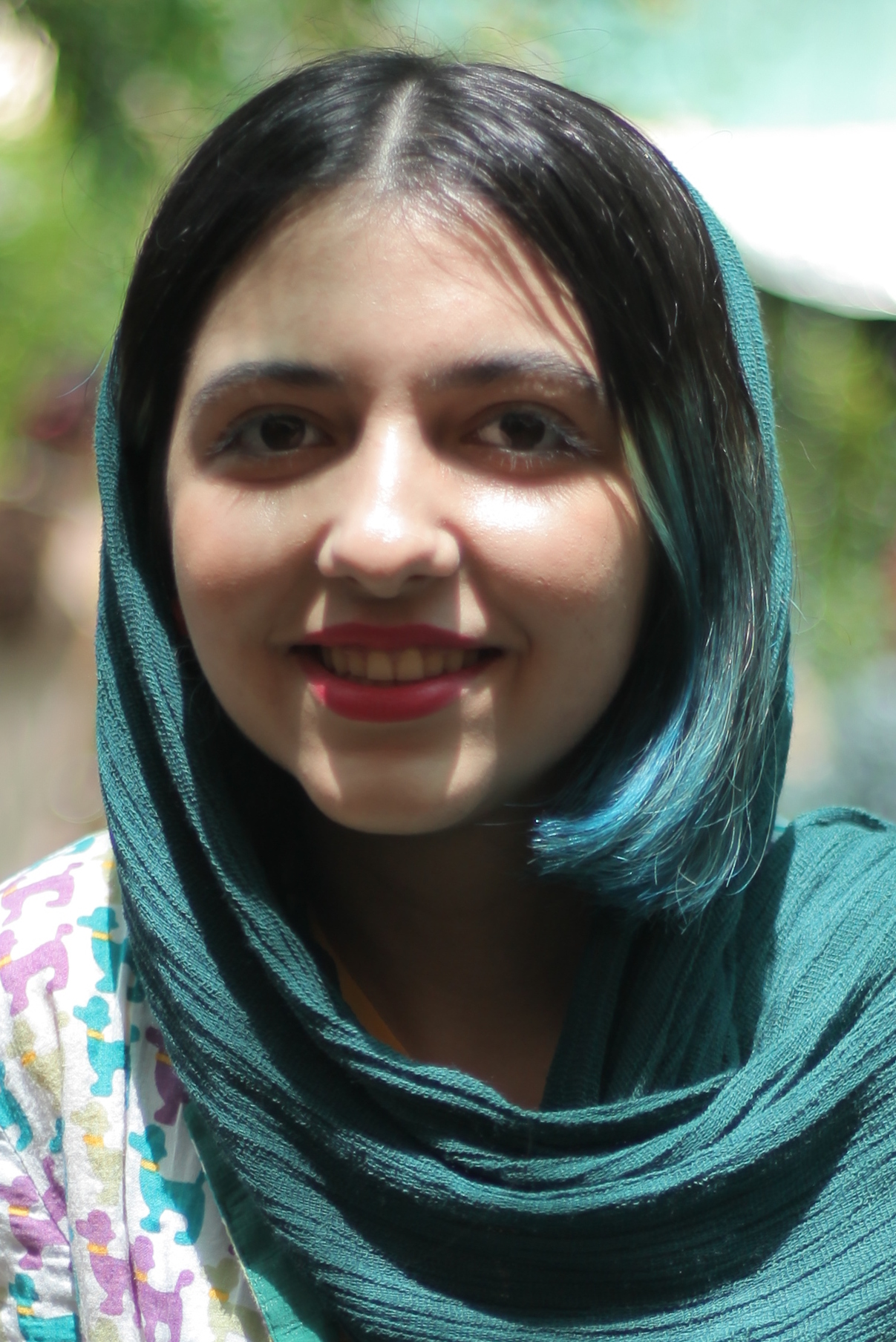
- Born: 29 July 2003 (age 23); Tehran, Iran
- Occupation: Iranian actress
- Years active: 2011–present
- Website: https://kimiyahosseini.com/

Kimia Hosseini (born August 7, 2003 in Tehran, Iran) is an Iranian actress. She is known for her roles in A Separation (2011) and Bodyguard (2016) among others.

Hosseini made her acting debut in 2010 at the age of seven. In this experience, she starred as daughter of main characters in Asghar Farhadi's Oscar-winning film A Separation (2011). She won the Silver Bear for Best Actress at the 61st Berlin International Film Festival jointly with Leila Hatami, Sareh Bayat, Sarina Farhadi and Shirin Yazdanbakhsh as part of ensemble of A Separation.

== Selected filmography ==
- A Separation (2011)
- Amaliyate Mahde Koodak (2012)
- Foster Kid (Farzand Khandeh) (2012)
- Hello Angels (Salam Bar Fereshtegan) (2012)
- Sakene Khane ye Choobi (2012)
- The Little Sparrows (Gonjeshkak -e Ashimashi) (2013)
- Bodyguard (2016)
- Aaadat Nemikonim (2016)
- The Last Monday (short, 2017)

== Awards ==
- Silver Bear for Best Actress in 61st Berlin Film Festival, Shared with other actresses of A Separation
