= 2011 National Society of Film Critics Awards =

Annual US film awards ceremony

The 46th National Society of Film Critics Awards, given on 7 January 2012, honored the best in film for 2011.

46th NSFC Awards

January 7, 2012

Best Film:
Melancholia

== Winners ==
Film titles are listed, following the number of votes each received:

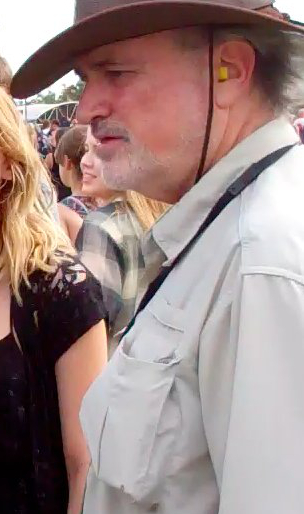
Terrence Malick, Best Director winner

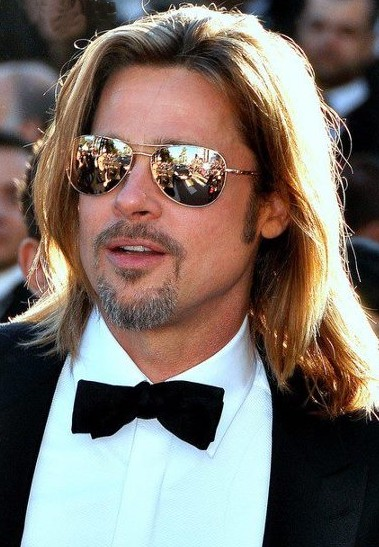
Brad Pitt, Best Actor winner

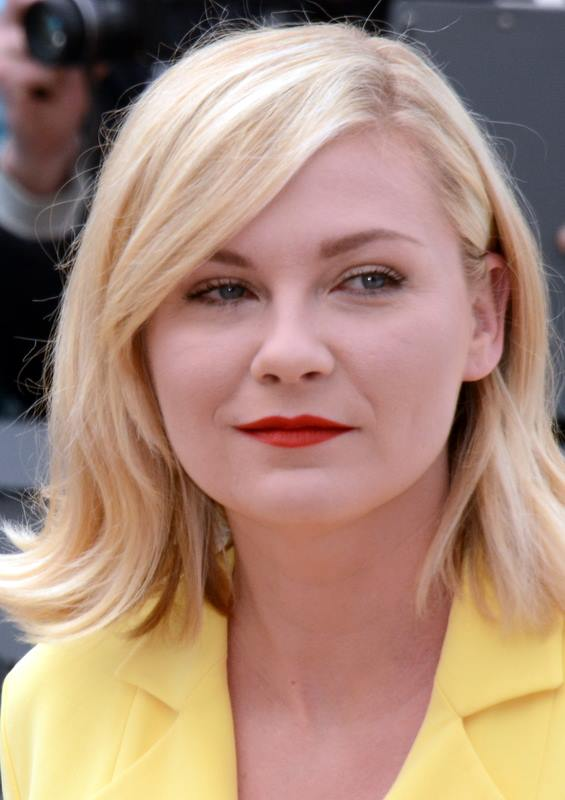
Kirsten Dunst, Best Actress winner

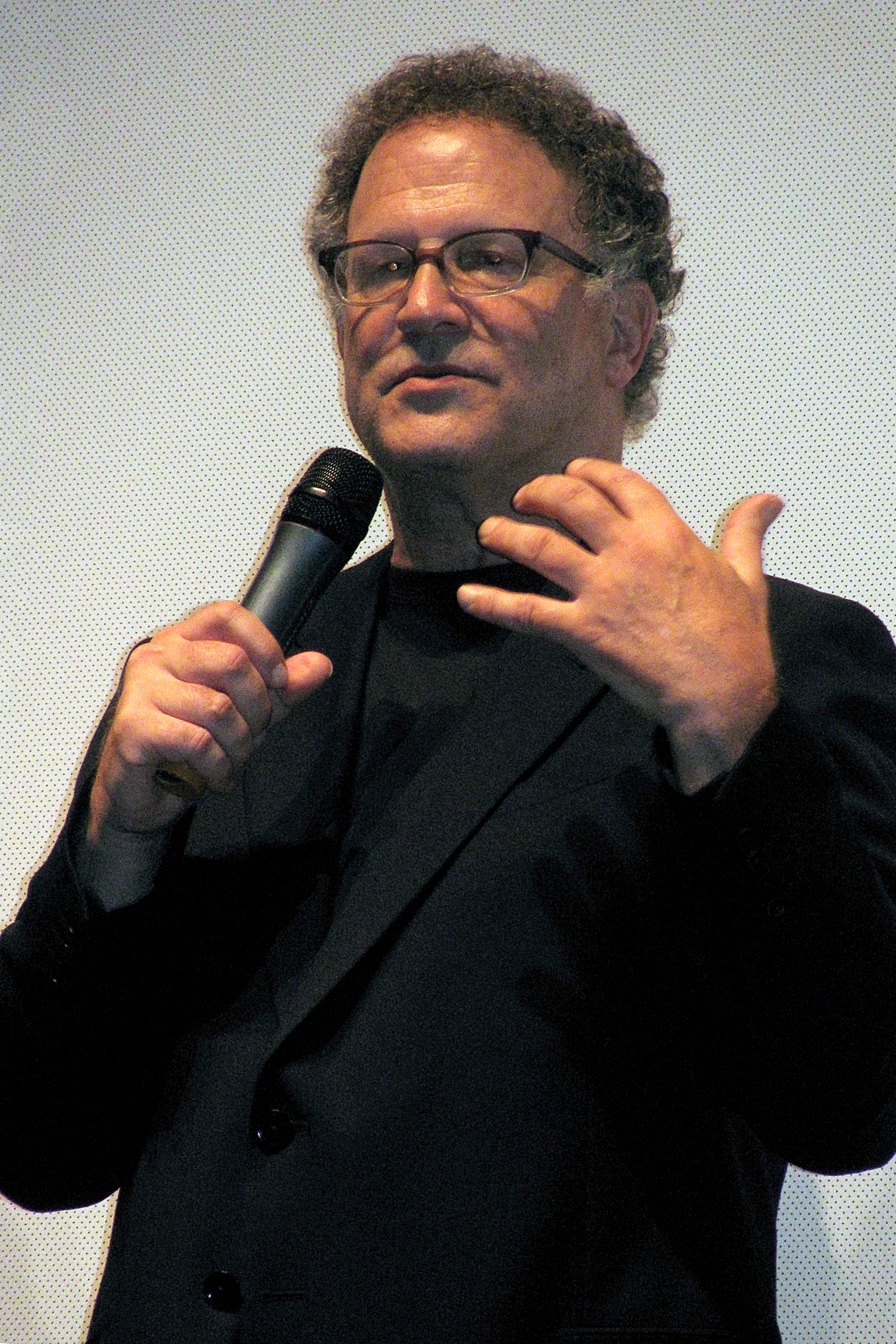
Albert Brooks, Best Supporting Actor winner

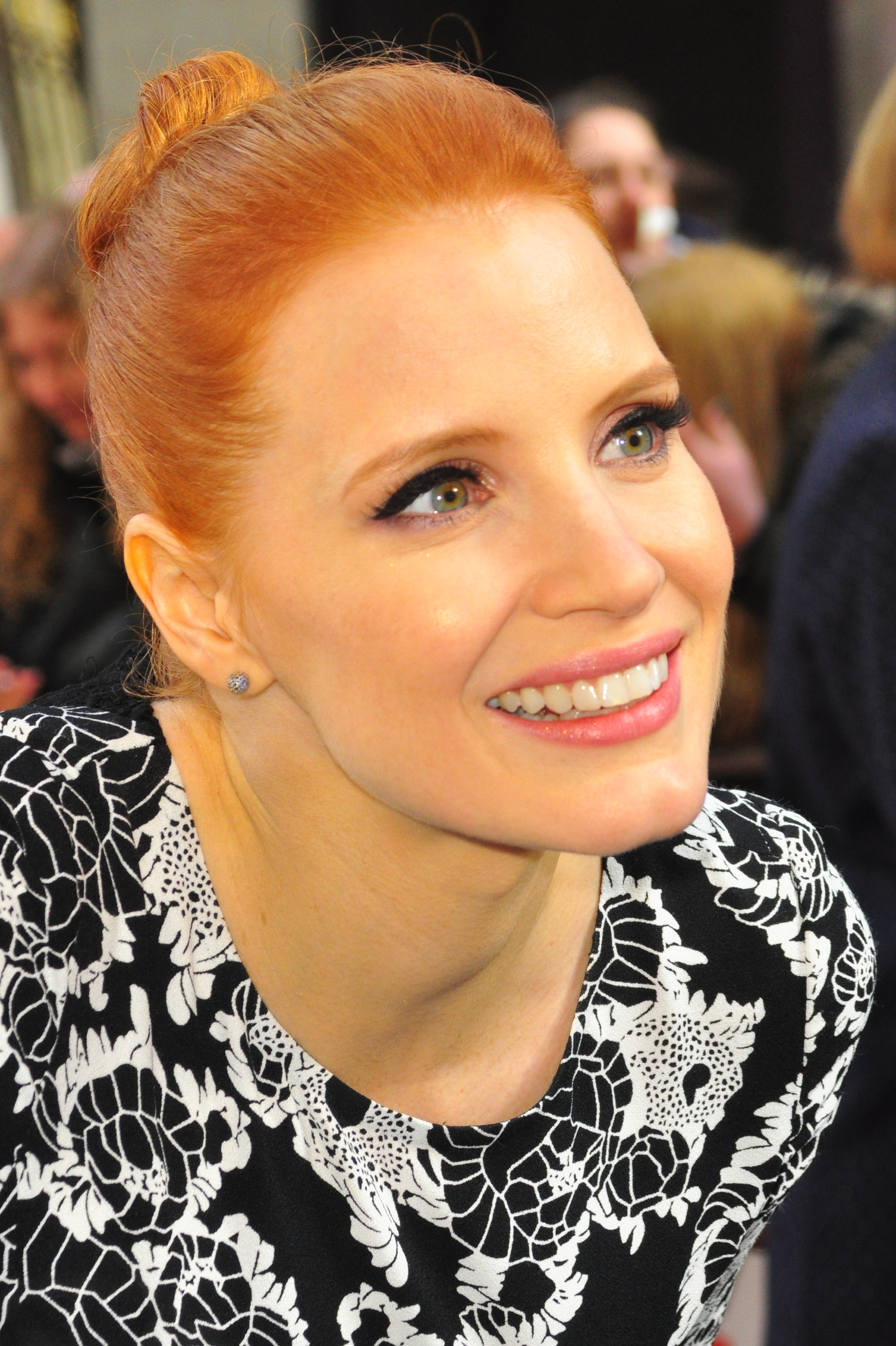
Jessica Chastain, Best Supporting Actress winner

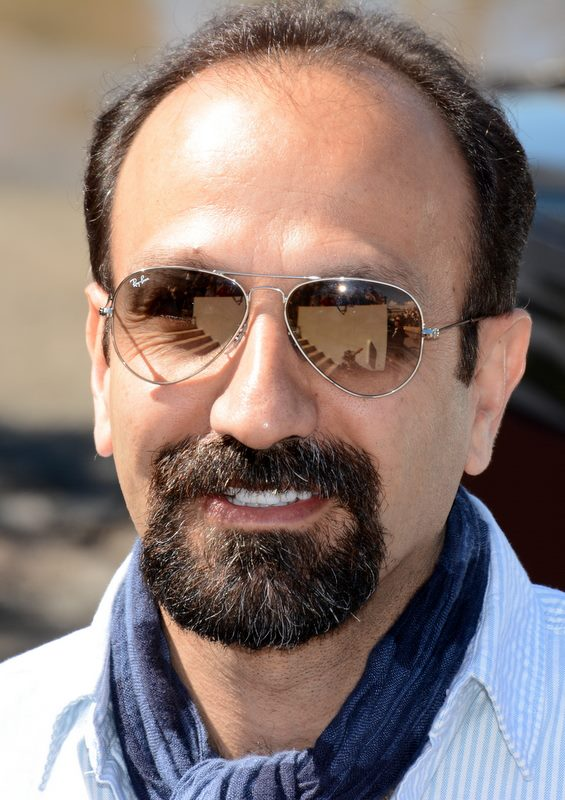
Asghar Farhadi, Best Screenplay winner

=== Best Picture ===
1. Melancholia (29)
2. The Tree of Life (28)
3. A Separation (20)

=== Best Director ===
1. Terrence Malick – The Tree of Life (31)
2. Martin Scorsese – Hugo (29)
3. Lars von Trier – Melancholia (23)

=== Best Actor ===
1. Brad Pitt – Moneyball and The Tree of Life (35)
2. Gary Oldman – Tinker Tailor Soldier Spy (22)
3. Jean Dujardin – The Artist (19)

=== Best Actress ===
1. Kirsten Dunst – Melancholia (39)
2. Yoon Jeong-hee – Poetry (25)
3. Meryl Streep – The Iron Lady (20)

=== Best Supporting Actor ===
1. Albert Brooks – Drive (38)
2. Christopher Plummer – Beginners (24)
3. Patton Oswalt – Young Adult (19)

=== Best Supporting Actress ===
1. Jessica Chastain – The Help, Take Shelter, and The Tree of Life (30)
2. Jeannie Berlin – Margaret (19)
3. Shailene Woodley – The Descendants (17)

=== Best Screenplay ===
1. Asghar Farhadi – A Separation (39)
2. Steven Zaillian and Aaron Sorkin – Moneyball (22)
3. Woody Allen – Midnight in Paris (16)

=== Best Cinematography ===
1. Emmanuel Lubezki – The Tree of Life (76)
2. Manuel Alberto Claro – Melancholia (41)
3. Robert Richardson – Hugo (33)

=== Best Foreign Language Film ===
1. A Separation (67)
2. Mysteries of Lisbon (28)
3. Le Havre (22)

=== Best Non-Fiction Film ===
1. Cave of Forgotten Dreams (35)
2. The Interrupters (26)
3. Into the Abyss (18)

=== Best Experimental Film ===
Seeking the Monkey King

=== Film Heritage Awards ===
1. BAMcinématek for its complete Vincente Minnelli retrospective with all titles shown on 16 mm or 35 mm film.
2. Lobster Films, Groupama Gan Foundation for Cinema, and Technicolor Foundation for Cinema Heritage for the restoration of the color version of Georges Méliès' A Trip to the Moon.
3. Museum of Modern Art for its extensive retrospective of Weimar Cinema.
4. Flicker Alley for their box set Landmarks of Early Soviet Film.
5. The Criterion Collection for its 2-disc DVD package of The Complete Jean Vigo.
