= Ali-Asghar Shahbazi =

Iranian actor (1922–2020)

- علی‌اصغر شهبازی
- Born: November 1922; Tehran, Iran
- Died: 29 November 2020 (aged 98); Tehran, Iran
- Occupation: Actor
- Years active: 2007–2013

Ali-Asghar Shahbazi (Persian: علی‌اصغر شهبازی; November 1922 – 29 November 2020) was an Iranian actor.

Shahbazi died on 29 November 2020 from cardiopulmonary arrest at the age of 98.

== Career ==
Before starting his acting career, Shahbazi was a bank employee who was not interested in cinema. Shahbazi's debut was in the film Under the Peach Tree by Iraj Tahmasb. He was cast as Nader's father after Asghar Farhadi saw that picture. For his role in A Separation, he won the Silver Bear for Best Actor (as part of ensemble) at 61st Berlin International Film Festival in 2011.

== Filmography ==
- Under the Peach Tree (2007)
- A Separation (2011)
- Five to Five (2013)
