= Grave dwellers =

Subgroup of homeless people particular to Iran

Grave Dwellers is a term for a particular form of homelessness in Iran, where homeless people avoid cold weather by sleeping in unused graves rather than cardboard boxes in public areas. The phenomenon was first noted in 2016 in a report by the Shahrvand newspaper, which mentioned about 50 grave dwellers in the cemetery of Nasirabad Shahriar, Tehran, and caused many reactions in social networks and among social celebrities.

Some sources claim that, after the report's publication, the homeless people were violently cleared from the cemetery.

In a letter to President Rouhani, the Oscar-winning Iranian director Asghar Farhadi expressed "shame" and "regret" about the condition of the "men, women, and children who spend their cold nights in a graveyard."

== Shahrvand newspaper report ==
In December 2016, the Shahrvand newspaper reported that homeless people were sleeping in open graves. 50 sleepers, who had formerly slept in cardboard boxes, were found around and inside Nasirabad's largest cemetery in Baghestan, on the outskirts of Shahriyar, occupying at least 20 graves. According to the report, some graves were occupied by up to four people.
