= Sareh Bayat =

Iranian actress

- ساره بیات
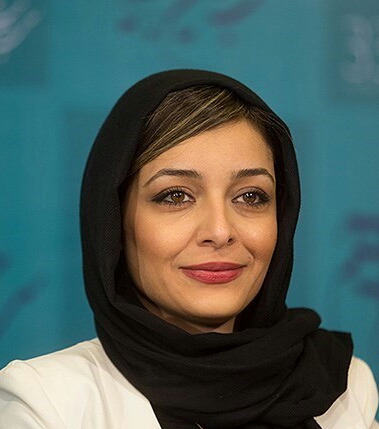
- Bayat at the 2015 Fajr International Film Festival
- Born: 6 October 1979 (age 46); Tehran, Iran
- Occupation: Actress
- Years active: 2001–present
- Known for: A Separation; Muhammad: The Messenger of God; Nahid
- Spouse: Alireza Afkari (m. 2021)

Sareh Bayat (Persian: ساره بیات; born 6 October 1979) is an Iranian actress. She began her career in theatre in 2001 and, after studying acting, appeared in the television series A Fistful of Eagle Feathers in 2007. Her first cinematic role was in the film Imitator of Satan.

Bayat received critical acclaim for her supporting role in the award-winning film A Separation (2011), for which she, along with the female ensemble, won the Silver Bear for Best Actress at the Berlin International Film Festival. She was also nominated for the Crystal Simorgh for Best Actress at the Fajr Film Festival for her leading roles in Oblivion Season (2013), We Won't Get Used to It (2015), and Almond Eyes (2024).

== Early life ==
Sareh Bayat was born on 6 October 1979 in Tehran, Iran. She graduated with a degree in carpet design and trained in acting at the Karnameh Institute. Bayat began performing in theatre at age 22 and made her television debut in 2007 with A Fistful of Eagle Feathers. Her parents initially opposed her pursuit of acting, leading her to secretly study art at university to enter the profession.

== Personal life ==
Bayat grew up in a family of four and has a younger sister named Sarvin, who is married to Reza Ghoochannejhad, an Iranian footballer.

She is married to Alireza Afkari, an Iranian composer and music arranger.

== Career ==
Bayat holds a degree in carpet design and is an ambassador for Iranian handicrafts. She began her acting career in 2001, performing in theatre, television, and film, having trained at the Karnameh Institute. In addition to acting, she engages in costume design and painting. Her cinematic debut was in Imitator of Satan (2006).

In 2011, she was cast in A Separation, earning the London Film Critics' Circle Award for Best Supporting Actress and, alongside Leila Hatami, Sarina Farhadi, and Kimia Hosseini, the Silver Bear for Best Actress at the Berlin International Film Festival. In 2017, she won the Best Actress award at the Hafez Awards for her role in the series Asheghaneh.

== Filmography ==
=== Film ===
Year	Title	Role	Director
2020	Killer Spider		Ebrahim Irajzad
2019	Labyrinth	Negar	Amir Hossein Torabi
2019	Symphony No. 9	Rahil	Mohammad Reza Honarmand
2019	Rahman 1400	Nazila	Manouchehr Hadi
2018	The Dark Room	Haleh	Rouhollah Hejazi
2017	Yellow	Nahal	Mostafa Taghizadeh
2017	Twenty One Days Later	Mother	Mohamad Reza Kheradmandan
2017	Lobby		Mohamad Parvizi
2015	We Will Not Get Used To	Mahtab	Ebrahim Ebrahimian
2015	Muhammad: The Messenger of God	Halimah	Majid Majidi
2015	Nahid	Nahid	Ida Panahandeh
2014	The Long Farewell	Mahroo	Farzad Motamen
2014	The Sleepy Ones	Nazgol	Fereydoun Jeyrani
2014	Resident of the Middle Floor		Shahab Hosseini
2014	Oblivion Season	Fariba	Abbas Rafei
2014	Lamp 100		Saeed Aghakhani
2011	A Separation	Razieh	Asghar Farhadi
2007	Imitator of the Devil		Afshin Sadeghi

=== Web ===
Year	Title	Role	Director	Platform
2016	The Romance	Pegah Dadgar	Manouchehr Hadi	Filimo
2019–2020	Heart	Rasta Pazhoheshi	Manouchehr Hadi	Filimo, Namava
2021	Gisoo (Romance 2)	Pegah Dadgar	Manouchehr Hadi	Namava

=== Television ===
Year	Title	Role	Director	Network
2007	One Fist of Eagle Feather	Mahshid	Asghar Hashemi	IRIB TV2
2008	Innocents	Nooshin Entezam	Ahmad Amini	IRIB TV3
2009	The Lady	Saharnaz	Farid Sajjadi Hosseini	IRIB TV3

== Awards and nominations ==
- SilverBear for Best Actress in 61st Berlin Film Festival, Shared with other actresses of A Separation
- Best actress in a supporting role in 29th Fajr International Film Festival for A Separation
- Supporting Actress of the Year in 32nd London Critics Circle Film Awards for A Separation
- Best Actress in Palm Springs International Film Festival, 2011 for A Separation - Shared with Leila Hatami and Sarina Farhadi

== Awards and nominations ==
Year	Award	Category	Work	Result	Ref.
2011	Iran Critics and Writers Association	Best Actress	A Separation	Won	
2011	29th Fajr Film Festival	Honorary Diploma for Best Supporting Actress	A Separation	Won	
2011	61st Berlin International Film Festival	Silver Bear for Best Actress (shared with female cast)	A Separation	Won	
2011	Jaipur International Film Festival	Best Actress	A Separation	Nominated	
2012	London Film Critics' Circle	Best Supporting Actress	A Separation	Won	
2012	Palm Springs International Film Festival	Best Actress (shared with female cast)	A Separation	Won	
2014	Fajr International Film Festival	Best Actress	Oblivion Season	Nominated	
2014	Iran Cinema Celebration	Best Actress	Nahid	Nominated	
2014	8th Iran Film Critics and Writers Celebration	Best Actress	—	Nominated	
2015	Ravi International Film Festival	Best Actress	Oblivion Season	Won	
2015	Tiburon International Film Festival	Best Actress	Oblivion Season	Won	
2016	34th Fajr Film Festival	Best Actress	We Won't Get Used to It	Nominated	
2015	Universal Film Festival	Best Actress	Oblivion Season	Nominated	
2015	New Jersey Film Festival	Best Actress	Oblivion Season	Nominated	
2015	Irvine International Film Festival	Best Actress	Oblivion Season	Won	
2016	Queens World Film Festival	Best Actress	Oblivion Season	Won	
2016	Chetcheragh Festival	Acting Award	—	Won	
2016	Love International Film Festival	Best Actress	Oblivion Season	Won	
2017	17th Hafez Awards	Best Actress in a Drama	Asheghaneh	Won	
2017	Shanghai International Film Festival	Best Actress	Yellow	Won	
2018	18th Hafez Awards	Best Actress	Yellow	Nominated	
