= London Film Critics Circle Awards 2011 =

British film awards ceremony

32nd London Film Critics Circle Awards

19 January 2012

Film of the Year:
The Artist

British Film of the Year:
We Need to
Talk About Kevin

The 32nd London Film Critics Circle Awards, honouring the best in film for 2011, were announced by the London Film Critics Circle on 19 January 2012.

== Winners and nominees ==
=== Film of the Year ===
The Artist

- Drive
- A Separation
- Tinker Tailor Soldier Spy
- The Tree of Life

=== British Film of the Year ===
We Need to Talk About Kevin

- The Guard
- Kill List
- Shame
- Tinker Tailor Soldier Spy

=== Foreign Language Film of the Year ===
A Separation • Iran

- Mysteries of Lisbon • Portugal
- Poetry • South Korea
- Le Quattro Volte • Italy
- The Skin I Live In • Spain

=== Documentary of the Year ===
Senna

- Cave of Forgotten Dreams
- Dreams of a Life
- Pina
- Project Nim

=== Director of the Year ===
Michel Hazanavicius – The Artist

- Asghar Farhadi – A Separation
- Terrence Malick – The Tree of Life
- Lynne Ramsay – We Need to Talk About Kevin
- Nicolas Winding Refn – Drive

=== Screenwriter of the Year ===
Asghar Farhadi – A Separation

- Michel Hazanavicius – The Artist
- Kenneth Lonergan – Margaret
- Alexander Payne, Nat Faxon, and Jim Rash – The Descendants
- Bridget O'Connor and Peter Straughan – Tinker Tailor Soldier Spy

=== Breakthrough British Filmmaker ===
Andrew Haigh – Weekend

- Richard Ayoade – Submarine
- Paddy Considine – Tyrannosaur
- Joe Cornish – Attack the Block
- John Michael McDonagh – The Guard

=== Actor of the Year ===
Jean Dujardin – The Artist

- George Clooney – The Descendants
- Michael Fassbender – Shame
- Ryan Gosling – Drive
- Gary Oldman – Tinker Tailor Soldier Spy

=== Actress of the Year ===
Anna Paquin – Margaret
Meryl Streep – The Iron Lady

- Kirsten Dunst – Melancholia
- Tilda Swinton – We Need to Talk About Kevin
- Michelle Williams – My Week with Marilyn

=== Supporting Actor of the Year ===
Kenneth Branagh – My Week with Marilyn

- Simon Russell Beale – The Deep Blue Sea
- Albert Brooks – Drive
- Christopher Plummer – Beginners
- Michael Smiley – Kill List

=== Supporting Actress of the Year ===
Sareh Bayat – A Separation

- Jessica Chastain – The Help
- Vanessa Redgrave – Coriolanus
- Octavia Spencer – The Help
- Jacki Weaver – Animal Kingdom

=== British Actor of the Year ===
Michael Fassbender – A Dangerous Method and Shame

- Tom Cullen – Weekend
- Brendan Gleeson – The Guard
- Peter Mullan – Tyrannosaur and War Horse
- Gary Oldman – Tinker Tailor Soldier Spy

=== British Actress of the Year ===
Olivia Colman – The Iron Lady and Tyrannosaur

- Carey Mulligan – Drive and Shame
- Vanessa Redgrave – Anonymous and Coriolanus
- Tilda Swinton – We Need to Talk About Kevin
- Rachel Weisz – The Deep Blue Sea

=== Young British Performer of the Year ===
Craig Roberts – Submarine

- John Boyega – Attack the Block
- Jeremy Irvine – War Horse
- Yasmin Paige – Submarine
- Saoirse Ronan – Hanna

=== Technical Achievement ===
Maria Djurkovic, production design – Tinker Tailor Soldier Spy

- Manuel Alberto Claro, cinematography – Melancholia
- Paul Davies, sound design – We Need to Talk About Kevin
- Dante Ferretti, production design – Hugo
- Alberto Iglesias, original score – The Skin I Live In
- Chris King and Gregers Sall, editing – Senna
- Joe Letteri, visual effects – Rise of the Planet of the Apes
- Cliff Martinez, original score – Drive
- Robert Richardson, cinematography – Hugo
- Robbie Ryan, cinematography – Wuthering Heights

=== Dilys Powell Award ===
- Nicolas Roeg
