= A Separation =

2011 Iranian drama film

- Theatrical release poster
- Directed by: Asghar Farhadi
- Written by: Asghar Farhadi
- Produced by: Asghar Farhadi
- Starring: Peyman Moaadi; Leila Hatami; Shahab Hosseini; Sareh Bayat; Sarina Farhadi; Babak Karimi; Merila Zarei
- Cinematography: Mahmoud Kalari
- Edited by: Hayedeh Safiyari
- Music by: Sattar Oraki
- Distributed by: Filmiran
- Release dates: 15 February 2011 (Berlin); 16 March 2011 (Iran)
- Running time: 123 minutes
- Country: Iran
- Language: Persian
- Budget: $800,000
- Box office: $24.4 million

A Separation (Persian: جدایی نادر از سیمین, romanized: Jodāi-e Nāder az Simin; lit. 'The Separation of Nader from Simin'; also titled Nader and Simin, A Separation) is a 2011 Iranian drama film written and directed by Asghar Farhadi, starring Leila Hatami, Peyman Moaadi, Shahab Hosseini, Sareh Bayat, and Sarina Farhadi. It focuses on an Iranian middle-class couple who separate, the disappointment and desperation suffered by their daughter due to the egotistical disputes and separation of her parents, and the conflicts that arise when the husband hires a lower-class caregiver for his elderly father, who has Alzheimer's disease.

A Separation won the Academy Award for Best Foreign Language Film in 2012, becoming the first Iranian film to win the award. It received the Golden Bear for Best Film and the Silver Bears for Best Actress and Best Actor at the 61st Berlin International Film Festival, becoming the first Iranian film to win the Golden Bear. It also won the Golden Globe for Best Foreign Language Film and the Asia Pacific Screen Award for Best Feature Film. The film was nominated for the Academy Award for Best Original Screenplay, making it the first non-English film in five years to achieve this. It has been considered one of the best films of the 21st century.

== Plot ==
Nader, Simin, and their 10-year-old daughter, Termeh, are an upper-middle-class family living in a flat in Tehran. Simin wants the whole family to leave Iran and has prepared the visas, but Nader wishes to stay to care for his father, who lives with them and has Alzheimer's disease. Simin therefore files for divorce, but the family court considers the grounds to be insufficient and rejects the application. Simin moves back to her parents’ home and Termeh stays with her father.

Nader hires Razieh, a deeply religious woman from a poor and distant suburb, to take care of his father during the day. She comes each day with her young daughter, Somayeh. She soon finds that she cannot cope, in particular because the old man has become incontinent. One day, when Razieh and Somayeh are busy, he slips out and wanders in the street. Razieh hastens out and dodges through the traffic to get to him.

The next day, Nader and Termeh come home early and discover the old man lying unconscious on the floor in his bedroom, tied to the bed. Razieh and Somayeh are out. When they return, Razieh says she had some urgent personal business; Nader accuses her of neglecting his father and stealing some money (which Simin had in fact used to pay some movers). When Razieh refuses to leave until he pays her, he pushes her out of the flat. She apparently falls down some steps. Nader and Simin later learn that Razieh has suffered a miscarriage.

If Nader knew of Razieh's pregnancy and caused the miscarriage, he could be guilty of murder. There is now a series of claims and counter-claims before a criminal judge: on one side, Nader, with Simin and Termeh; on the other, Razieh and her husband, Hodjat. He is a hot-tempered man, embittered and humiliated by the loss of his long-time job as a cobbler, and harassed by creditors. More than once, he attempts to assault Nader.

Razieh says that Nader knew of her pregnancy because he heard a conversation in the flat between her and Termeh's tutor, in which the tutor recommended a doctor to her. Nader denies this, and the tutor gives evidence in his support. Termeh finds reasons to believe this is not true, and Nader at last admits to her that he has lied for her sake and his father's: he cannot go to prison. The tutor withdraws her evidence. To protect her father, Termeh tells the judge that her father did not know of the pregnancy until she told him.

Nader claims that when he pushed Razieh out of the flat, she could not have fallen down the steps, but would have been protected by the railing. Razieh confesses to Simin that when she went out to bring back the old man, she was hit by a car and was in pain that night; this was the day before Nader pushed her, and she had gone out that day to see a doctor.

Hodjat is violent, and Simin fears for Termeh's safety. Simin persuades Nader to make a payment to Hodjat, but Nader first asks Razieh to swear on the Qur'an that he is the cause of her miscarriage. She cannot do so. Hodjat cannot force her, and begins hitting himself in a rage.

Later, at the family court, Nader and Simin are granted a divorce. As the film ends, they wait separately outside the court while Termeh tells the judge which parent she chooses to live with.

== Cast ==
- Leila Hatami as Simin, a teacher and mother in Tehran
- Peyman Moaadi as Nader, Simin's husband of 14 years
- Sarina Farhadi as Termeh, Simin and Nader's teenaged daughter
- Sareh Bayat as Razieh, devout wife and mother employed as a caregiver for Nader's father
- Shahab Hosseini as Hodjat, Razieh's troubled and unemployed husband
- Kimia Hosseini as Somayeh, Razieh and Hodjat's young daughter
- Merila Zarei as Mrs Ghahraei, Termeh's teacher
- Babak Karimi as Judge
- Shirin Yazdanbakhsh as Simin's mother and Nader's mother-in-law
- Ali-Asghar Shahbazi as Nader's elderly father, suffering from severe Alzheimer's

== Production ==
The concept came from a number of personal experiences and abstract pictures which had been in Asghar Farhadi's mind for some time. Once he decided to make the film, about a year before it premiered, it was quickly written and financed. Farhadi described the film as the "logical development" from his previous film, About Elly. Like Farhadi's last three films, A Separation was made without any government support. The financing went without trouble much thanks to the success of About Elly. The production was granted US$25,000 in support from the Motion Picture Association's APSA Academy Film Fund.

In September 2010, Farhadi was banned from making the film by the Iranian Ministry of Culture and Islamic Guidance, because of an acceptance speech held during an award ceremony where he expressed support for several Iranian film personalities. Notably he had wished to see the return to Iranian cinema of Mohsen Makhmalbaf, an exiled filmmaker and Iranian opposition profile, and of the imprisoned political filmmaker Jafar Panahi, both of whom had been connected to the Iranian Green Movement. The ban was lifted in the beginning of October after Farhadi claimed to have been misperceived and apologized for his remarks.

== Release and reception ==
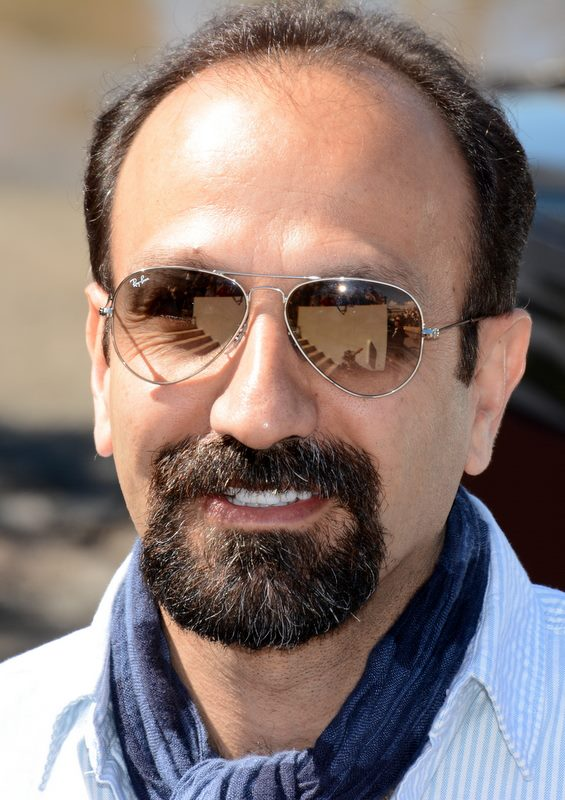
Asghar Farhadi, winner of the Golden Bear at the Berlin Film Festival for A Separation

The film premiered on 9 February 2011 at the 29th Fajr International Film Festival in Tehran. Six days later it played in Competition at the 61st Berlin International Film Festival. Farhadi had previously competed at the festival's 2009 edition with About Elly, for which he had received the Silver Bear for Best Director. A Separation was distributed in Iran through Filmiran. Distribution rights for the United Kingdom were acquired by Artificial Eye.

=== Box office ===
As of 17 April 2014, A Separation has grossed worldwide over $24 million on an estimated budget of just $800,000, making it a huge box-office success.

=== Critical reception ===
The film has been met with universal acclaim from film critics. It currently holds a 99% "fresh" rating on Rotten Tomatoes, based on 176 reviews with an average rating of 8.90/10. The website's critical consensus states, "Morally complex, suspenseful, and consistently involving, A Separation captures the messiness of a dissolving relationship with keen insight and searing intensity." The site ranked it 24th on their "300 Best Movies of All Time" list in 2025. It has a score of 95 on Metacritic based on 41 reviews, making it the best-reviewed film of 2011.

Deborah Young of The Hollywood Reporter wrote from the Berlinale:

Just when it seemed impossible for Iranian filmmakers to express themselves meaningfully outside the bounds of censorship, Asghar Farhadi's Nader and Simin, A Separation comes along to prove the contrary. Apparently simple on a narrative level yet morally, psychologically and socially complex, it succeeds in bringing Iranian society into focus for in a way few other films have done.

Young noted how Farhadi portrayed Iran's social and religious divisions, and complimented the film's craft:

As in all the director's work, the cast is given top consideration and their realistic acting results in unusual depth of characterization. All five main actors stand out sharply in Mahmood Kalari's intimate cinematography. Though the film lasts over two hours, Hayedeh Safiyari's fast-moving editing keeps the action tensely involving from start to finish.

In a strongly positive review from Screen Daily, Lee Marshall wrote:

Showing a control of investigative pacing that recalls classic Hitchcock and a feel for ethical nuance that is all his own, Farhadi has hit upon a story that is not only about men and women, children and parents, justice and religion in today's Iran, but that raises complex and globally relevant questions of responsibility, of the subjectivity and contingency of "telling the truth", and of how thin the line can be between inflexibility and pride – especially of the male variety – and selfishness and tyranny.

Alissa Simon from Variety called it Farhadi's strongest work yet and described it:

Tense and narratively complex, formally dense and morally challenging... The provocative plot casts a revealing light on contempo Iranian society, taking on issues of gender, class, justice and honor as a secular middle-class family in the midst of upheaval winds up in conflict with an impoverished religious one.

David Thomson for The New Republic wrote:

You cannot watch the film without feeling kinship with the characters and admitting their decency as well as their mistakes. The American films made this year that deal with the internal detail and difficulty of family life – like The Descendants — are airy, pretty and affluent compared with A Separation. With the best will in the world, George Clooney cannot discard his aura of stardom, yet the actors in the Iranian film seem caught in their characters' traps.

The film won the Fajr Film Festival's Crystal Simorghs for Best Director, Best Screenplay, Best Cinematographer and Best Sound Recorder. It also received the Audience Favourite Film award. It won the top award, the Golden Bear for Best Film, at the 61st Berlin International Film Festival. The actress ensemble received the Silver Bear for Best Actress, and the actor ensemble the Silver Bear for Best Actor. In addition it received the Competition Prize of the Ecumenical Jury and the Berliner Morgenpost Readers' Prize. Isabella Rossellini, the Jury president of the Berlin International Film Festival, said that the choice of Farhadi's film for the Golden Bear was "pretty unanimous". Farhadi commented that he never would have thought he would win the Golden Bear, and that the film's victory offered "a very good opportunity to think of the people of my country, the country I grew up in, the country where I learned my stories – a great people". Ahmad Miralaii, the director of Iran's Farabi Cinematic Foundation, said that "Iranian cinema is proud of the awards", as he welcomed Farhadi at the airport upon the director's return from Berlin.

A Separation was voted the second best film of 2011 in the annual Sight & Sound critic poll, as well as in the LA Weekly Film Poll 2011. The film was also voted No. 3 in the annual indieWire critic survey for 2011, No. 4 in the 2011 poll by Film Comment, and was ranked No. 5 on Paste magazine's 50 Best Movies of 2011. Roger Ebert ranked the film No. 1 on his The Best Films of 2011 list and wrote: "A Separation will become one of those enduring masterpieces watched decades from now". In 2024, Looper ranked it number 7 on its list of the "50 Best PG-13 Movies of All Time," writing "While you can't go wrong with any Farhadi movie, A Separation is an especially strong and thoughtful achievement from this artist."

Iranian critic Massoud Farasati, whose views are close to those of the Islamic regime, said "The image of our society that A Separation depicts is the dirty picture westerners are wishing for".

=== Industry reaction ===
Steven Spielberg stated he believed the film to be the best of that year by a wide margin. Other admirers of the film included Woody Allen who called Farhadi to congratulate him on the film. David Fincher, Meryl Streep, Brad Pitt, and Angelina Jolie spoke to Farhadi during the awards season each offering their praise for him and the film.

=== Top ten lists ===
The film has appeared on numerous critics' top ten lists for 2011, some notable of which are the following:

- 1st: Roger Ebert, Chicago Sun-Times
- 1st: Joe Morgenstern, The Wall Street Journal
- 1st: Peter Rainer, The Christian Science Monitor
- 1st: Mike D'Angelo, Freelance
- 1st: Nathaniel Rogers, The Film Experience
- 1st: Kristy Puchko, The Film Stage
- 1st: A. A. Dowd, Time Out Chicago
- 2nd: Alison Willmore, The A.V. Club
- 2nd: Andrea Gronvall, Chicago Reader
- 2nd: Oliver Lyttelton, The Playlist
- 2nd: Chuck Bowen, Slant
- 2nd: David Fear, Time Out New York
- 2nd: Peter Martin, Twitch
- 2nd: Tom Hall, Sarasota Film Festival
- 3rd: Marjorie Baumgarten, Austin Chronicle
- 3rd: Noel Murray, The A.V. Club
- 3rd: Scott Tobias, The A.V. Club
- 3rd: Peter Bradshaw, The Guardian
- 3rd: Rene Rodriguez, Miami Herald
- 3rd: Dave McCoy, MSN Movies
- 3rd: Nick Schager, Slant
- 3rd: Peter Howell, Toronto Star
- 4th: Ray Greene, Boxoffice Magazine
- 4th: Owen Gleiberman, Entertainment Weekly

Sight & Sound magazine included the film in its list of "30 great films of the 2000s". A Separation was later named the ninth-greatest film of the 21st century in a 2016 BBC critics' poll. In 2018, the film was ranked 21st in the BBC's list of The 100 greatest foreign language films of all time. In 2019, The Guardian ranked the film 36th in its 100 best films of the 21st century list. In 2021, members of Writers Guild of America West (WGAW) and Writers Guild of America, East (WGAE) voted its screenplay 66th in WGA’s 101 Greatest Screenplays of the 21st Century (So Far). In 2022, Sight and Sound ranked the film 72nd in its Directors' 100 Greatest Films of All Time list In 2025, the film ranked number 33 on The New York Times' list of "The 100 Best Movies of the 21st Century" and was one of the films voted for the "Readers' Choice" edition of the list, finishing at number 145. In July 2025, it ranked number 12 on Rolling Stone's list of "The 100 Best Movies of the 21st Century."

== Awards and nominations ==
Award	Date of ceremony	Category	Recipient(s)	Result	Ref(s)
Academy Awards	26 February 2012	Best Original Screenplay	Asghar Farhadi	Nominated	
Academy Awards	26 February 2012	Best Foreign Language Film	A Separation	Won	
Asia Pacific Screen Awards	24 November 2011	Best Feature Film	A Separation	Won	
Asia Pacific Screen Awards	24 November 2011	Achievement in Directing	Asghar Farhadi	Nominated	
Asia Pacific Screen Awards	24 November 2011	Best Performance by an Actor	Peyman Moaadi	Nominated	
Asia Pacific Screen Awards	24 November 2011	Best Screenplay	Asghar Farhadi	Nominated	
Asian Film Awards	19 March 2012	Best Film	A Separation	Won	
Asian Film Awards	19 March 2012	Best Director	Asghar Farhadi	Won	
Asian Film Awards	19 March 2012	Best Actress	Leila Hatami	Nominated	
Asian Film Awards	19 March 2012	Favorite Actress	Leila Hatami	Nominated	
Asian Film Awards	19 March 2012	Best Screenwriter	Asghar Farhadi	Won	
Asian Film Awards	19 March 2012	Best Editor	Hayedeh Safiyari	Won	
BBC Four World Cinema Awards	20 November 2011	BBC Four World Cinema Award	Asghar Farhadi	Won	
Berlin International Film Festival	20 February 2011	Golden Bear	Asghar Farhadi	Won	
Berlin International Film Festival	20 February 2011	Best Actress	Leila Hatami, Sareh Bayat, Sarina Farhadi and Kimia Hosseini	Won	
Berlin International Film Festival	20 February 2011	Best Actor	Peyman Moaadi, Shahab Hosseini, Ali-Asghar Shahbazi and Babak Karimi	Won	
Berlin International Film Festival	20 February 2011	Prize of the Ecumenical Jury	Asghar Farhadi	Won	
Bodil Awards	3 March 2012	Best Non-American Film	A Separation	Won	
Boston Society of Film Critics	11 December 2011	Best Foreign Language Film	A Separation	Runner-up	
British Academy Film Awards	12 February 2012	Best Film Not in the English Language	A Separation	Nominated	
British Independent Film Awards	4 December 2011	Best Foreign Film	A Separation	Won	
Broadcast Film Critics Association	12 January 2012	Best Foreign Language Film	A Separation	Won	
Camerimage	5 December 2011	Silver Frog	Mahmoud Kalari	Won	
Chicago Film Critics Association	19 December 2011	Best Foreign Language Film	A Separation	Won	
César Awards	24 February 2012	Best Foreign Film	A Separation	Won	
Dallas-Fort Worth Film Critics Association	16 December 2011	Best Foreign Language Film	A Separation	Won	
David di Donatello Awards	4 May 2012	Best Foreign Film	A Separation	Won	
Durban International Film Festival	29 July 2012	Best Foreign Language Film	A Separation	Won	
Fajr International Film Festival	19 February 2011	Audience Award – Best Film	A Separation	Won	
Fajr International Film Festival	19 February 2011	Crystal Simorgh Award – Best Director	Asghar Farhadi	Won	
Fajr International Film Festival	19 February 2011	Crystal Simorgh Award – Best Cinematography	Mahmoud Kalari	Won	
Fajr International Film Festival	19 February 2011	Crystal Simorgh Award – Best Screenplay	Asghar Farhadi	Won	
Fajr International Film Festival	19 February 2011	Crystal Simorgh Award – Best Sound Recording	Mahmoud Samakbashi	Won	
Fajr International Film Festival	19 February 2011	Diploma of Honor – Best Actor in a Supporting Role	Shahab Hosseini	Won	
Fajr International Film Festival	19 February 2011	Diploma of Honor – Best Actress in a Supporting Role	Sareh Bayat	Won	
Golden Globe Awards	13 January 2012	Best Foreign Language Film	A Separation	Won	
Guldbagge Awards	23 January 2012	Best Foreign Film	A Separation	Won	
Independent Spirit Awards	25 February 2012	Best Foreign Film	A Separation	Won	
International Film Festival of India	3 December 2011	Best Director	Asghar Farhadi	Won	
London Film Critics' Circle	19 January 2012	Foreign Language Film of the Year	A Separation	Won	
London Film Critics' Circle	19 January 2012	Film of the Year	A Separation	Nominated	
London Film Critics' Circle	19 January 2012	Director of the Year	Asghar Farhadi	Nominated	
London Film Critics' Circle	19 January 2012	Screenwriter of the Year	Asghar Farhadi	Won	
London Film Critics' Circle	19 January 2012	Supporting Actress of the Year	Sareh Bayat	Won	
Los Angeles Film Critics Association	11 December 2011	Best Foreign Language Film	A Separation	Runner-up	
Los Angeles Film Critics Association	11 December 2011	Best Screenplay	Asghar Farhadi	Won	
Melbourne International Film Festival	24 August 2011	Most Popular Feature Film	A Separation	Won	
National Board of Review	1 December 2011	Best Foreign Language Film	A Separation	Won	
National Society of Film Critics	7 January 2012	Best Film	A Separation	3rd Place	
National Society of Film Critics	7 January 2012	Best Screenplay	Asghar Farhadi	Won	
National Society of Film Critics	7 January 2012	Best Foreign Language Film	A Separation	Won	
New York Film Critics Circle	29 November 2011	Best Foreign Language Film	A Separation	Won	
Online Film Critics Society	2 January 2012	Best Foreign Language Film	A Separation	Won	
Palm Springs International Film Festival	15 January 2012	FIPRESCI award for best actress	Leila Hatami, Sareh Bayat and Sarina Farhadi	Won	
Satellite Awards	18 December 2011	Best Foreign Language Film	A Separation	Nominated	
Sydney Film Festival	20 June 2011	Best Film	Asghar Farhadi	Won	
Toronto Film Critics Association	14 December 2011	Best Foreign Language Film	A Separation	Runner-up	
Toronto International Film Festival	18 September 2011	People's Choice Award	Asghar Farhadi	Runner-up	
Vancouver International Film Festival	16 October 2011	Roger's People's Choice Award	Asghar Farhadi	Won	
Yerevan International Film Festival	18 July 2011	Grand Prix – Golden Apricot for Best Feature Film	Asghar Farhadi	Won	

^{^[I]} Each date is linked to the article about the awards held that year wherever possible.
