= Dancing in the Dust (2003 film) =

- Directed by: Asghar Farhadi
- Written by: Asghar Farhadi; Alireza Bazrafshan; Mohammad Reza Fazeli
- Produced by: Iraj Taghipoor
- Starring: Faramarz Gharibian; Baran Kosari; Yousef Khodaparast
- Cinematography: Hassan Karimi
- Edited by: Saeed Shahsavari
- Music by: Hamidreza Sadri
- Release date: 2003
- Running time: 95 minutes
- Country: Iran
- Language: Persian

Dancing in the Dust (Persian: رقص در غبار) is a 2003 Iranian drama film directed by Asghar Farhadi.

== Plot ==
Nazar is a young man who one day meets Reyhaneh on a minibus, and they marry. However, derogatory rumors about Reyhaneh's mother and pressure from his family lead Nazar to divorce her. Reyhaneh accepts his decision, but Nazar feels obligated before the court to pay Reyhaneh her marriage settlement by installment while he also owes the bank the money he borrowed as a loan to fund his wedding.

Nazar's job is to look after horses that are used to produce antivenom by injecting them with snake venom. One day, the police arrive to arrest Nazar because he has failed to pay the bank loan.

Nazar secretly enters a car belonging to an reclusive grim snake catcher. They drive into the middle of a desert where the snake catcher looks for snakes. When the man notices Nazar, he drives him away without even saying a word to him. Despite the man's hostile treatment, Nazar decides to stay there to help him and catch snakes to make money and pay Reyhaneh's marriage settlement whom he says he still loves.

After some effort, Nazar succeeds in catching a snake, but he grabs it by the tail. The snake bites the ring finger of his left hand, and the snake catcher is forced to amputate the finger. He places the finger in a iced container and takes Nazar to the hospital to have the finger surgically reattached.

On the way, the man tells Nazar about his life. He says that he strangled a man who had been interested in his wife and was subsequently sent to prison. But after escaping from prison, he discovered that his wife had remarried. He asks Nazar why he still cares about Reyhaneh and how he would feel if he finds she has remarried. Nazar says that he still loves her and he wishes she can find happiness by remarrying.

At the hospital, they demand money for the operation. The snake catcher, who now seems like a changed man, obtains the money. Nazar, however, takes the money and flees the hospital. Later, he goes to Reyhaneh's house and gives all the money to her.

Later, Nazar sees the snake catcher's car and equipment at a roadside stall. He realizes that the snake catcher sold his car to obtain the money for Nazar's surgery.

== Cast ==
- Faramarz Gharibian as The Old Man
- Baran Kosari as Rayhaneh
- Yousef Khodaparast as Nazar

== Awards and nominations ==
Year	Group	Award	Recipients and nominees	Result
2003	Asia-Pacific Film Festival	Best Director	Asghar Farhadi	Won
2003	Asia-Pacific Film Festival	Best Screenplay	Asghar Farhadi, Reza Fazeli, Alireza Bazrafshan	Won
2003	Asia-Pacific Film Festival	Best Supporting Actor	Faramarz Gharibian	Won
2003	25th Moscow International Film Festival	Silver St. George – Best Actor	Faramarz Gharibian	Won
2003	25th Moscow International Film Festival	Golden St. George	Asghar Farhadi	Nominated
2003	Fajr Film Festival	Special Jury Award – International Competition - Best Film	Asghar Farhadi	Won
2003	Pusan International Film Festival	New Currents Award	Asghar Farhadi	Nominated
