= Mysteries of Lisbon =

2010 Portuguese epic period melodrama film

Mysteries Of Lisbon
- American poster
- Directed by: Raúl Ruiz
- Written by: Carlos Saboga
- Based on: Os Mistérios de Lisboa by Camilo Castelo Branco
- Produced by: Paulo Branco
- Starring: Maria João Bastos; Clotilde Hesme
- Cinematography: André Szankowski
- Edited by: Carlos Madaleno; Valeria Sarmiento
- Music by: Jorge Arriagada; Luís de Freitas Branco
- Distributed by: Clap - Produção de Filmes (Portugal); Alfama Films (France)
- Release dates: 12 September 2010 (Toronto); 21 October 2010 (Portugal)
- Running time: 272 minutes
- Countries: Portugal; France
- Languages: Portuguese; French; English
- Budget: €2.5 million

Mysteries Of Lisbon (Portuguese: Mistérios De Lisboa) is a 2010 Portuguese epic period melodrama film directed by Chilean filmmaker Raúl Ruiz based on an 1854 novel of the same name by Camilo Castelo Branco. The movie's running time is 272 minutes. It played as a miniseries in 60-minute installments in some countries. The film has won nine awards and been nominated for eight more.

The plot of Mysteries Of Lisbon is rich with coincidences, plot twists, multiple narrators, disguises, and flashbacks-within-flashbacks. Every major character possesses at least two identities, and the story—which hopscotches around Europe in the late 18th and early 19th centuries—is set against the Napoleonic Wars and includes pirates, a woman hellbent on avenging the death of her twin brother, and at least four different love triangles. Above all, Mysteries Of Lisbon is about the mechanics of storytelling and imagination.

Since its release the movie has been described by some as one of the finest movies from 2010s, one of the best historical, melodrama and epic movies of all time, as well as one of the best Portuguese movies ever made.

== Plot ==
The film initially focuses on João (João Arrais), an orphan boy at a school run by the priest Father Dinis (Adriano Luz) during Portugal's Revolução Liberal. João becomes ill after being bullied by another boy who tells him he is a criminal's child. He awakens in a delirium to find a lovely woman watching over his bed. After João recovers, Dinis takes him to see the woman who is indeed his mother, Countess Ângela de Lima (Maria João Bastos). For João's entire life, she has been imprisoned in her own home by her husband, the Count of Santa Bárbara (Albano Jerónimo). Dinis helps Ângela flee from her husband's house when he's away fighting the revolutionaries.

We finally learn João is the love child of Ângela and Pedro da Silva (João Baptista), a young nobleman without a fortune. Ângela's own father, the Marquis of Montezelos (Rui Morrison), rejects da Silva's offer of marriage, and even hires the assassin "Knife Eater" (Ricardo Pereira) to kill the impoverished young nobleman. Before dying, da Silva manages to find refuge with Dinis, and tells him his story. Dinis dons the guise of a gypsy and follows Ângela into the country where she gives birth to João. Dinis also intercepts and buys off Knife Eater, who has orders from Ângela's father to abduct and kill the baby. Dinis sees to the baby João's upbringing, and Ângela is summarily married off to the Count of Santa Bárbara by her father.

In the present, the Count of Santa Bárbara spreads rumors that Ângela is Dinis's lover. When Dinis tracks him down to make him recant, he finds the Count on his deathbed, tended by his maid and lover Eugénia (Joana de Verona). Dinis also encounters Knife Eater again, who has returned from Brazil after using Dinis's money to seek an ill-gotten fortune there. Knife Eater now goes by the name Alberto de Magalhães, and mocks the Count's slander. When the Count finally dies, Ângela, who never believed she was the Count's proper wife, refuses the inheritance. She leaves João with Dinis, and goes to live in a convent.

Dinis is himself the son of an illicit aristocratic affair. He finds this out when Friar Baltasar da Encarnação (José Manuel Mendes), the priest who gave the Count his last rites, recounts his own story. In his past, Friar Baltasar was Álvaro de Albuquerque (Carloto Cotta), who seduced and fell for the Countess de Vizo (Maria João Pinho), the wife of an acquaintance. They ran off together to Italy where she died while giving birth to Dinis. Álvaro then gave young Dinis to a friend to raise, who then gave Dinis to someone else, and so on, until finally Dinis is being raised by a French nobleman. The young Dinis fights for Napoleon's army in Spain under the name of Sebastião de Melo.

De Magalhães (the former Knife Eater) is now happily married to Eugénia, the former mistress of the Count of Santa Bárbara. However, in the past, he once paid a widowed French duchess, Elisa de Montfort (Clotilde Hesme) for sex, and Elisa tries to disrupt his marriage by returning his money. When Dinis tells Elisa the story of her mother's death, de Magalhães bursts in. He nearly strangles Elisa to death after she threatens to shoot him, but Dinis talks him out of the murder. Elisa is the daughter of Dinis's own tragic love, Blanche de Montfort (Léa Seydoux), who married Dinis's comrade-in-arms Benoît (Julien Alluguette), but took a lover, Lacroze (Melvil Poupaud). Lacroze was a man who was saved by Benoît and Dinis from a roadside firing squad during the war. Overcome with jealousy, Benoît sabotages Blanche's relationship with Lacroze, causing him to commit suicide, and ultimately kills Blanche in a fire.

João grows into a young poet (José Afonso Pimentel) and encounters Elisa, who vaguely resembles his mother. When he falls for her, Elisa enlists his aid to avenge her honor by challenging de Magalhães to a duel. De Magalhães complies but gets João to call it off by revealing the role he played in his past, including the accidental death of Elisa's twin brother, Arthur, after being sent by Elisa to kill de Magalhães. João leaves Portugal for a far-off colony, falls ill, and dictates his memoirs from his own supposed deathbed. His final vision is his memory of his mother looking over him when he lay sick as a child.

== Cast ==
- Adriano Luz as Father Dinis & Sabino Cabra & Sebastião de Melo
- Maria João Bastos as Ângela de Lima
- Ricardo Pereira as Alberto de Magalhães & Knife-Eater (Come-Facas)
- Clotilde Hesme as Elisa de Montfort
- Afonso Pimentel as Pedro da Silva
- João Luís Arrais as Pedro da Silva – Child
- João Villas-Boas as Craido
- Albano Jerónimo as Count of Santa Bárbara
- João Baptista as D. Pedro da Silva
- Martin Loizillon as Sebastião de Melo
- Julien Alluguette as Benoît de Montfort
- Rui Morisson as Marquis of Montezelos
- Joana de Verona as Eugénia
- Carloto Cotta as D. Álvaro de Albuquerque
- Maria João Pinho as Countess of Viso
- José Manuel Mendes as Friar Baltasar da Encarnação
- Léa Seydoux as Blanche de Montfort
- Melvil Poupaud as Ernest Lacroze
- Malik Zidi as Armagnac

== Episode guide ==
Mysteries of Lisbon was a series of six episodes that aired on television in several countries before being compiled into a feature film in 2010.

Episode 1: At a boys' college run by Father Dinis, young orphan Joao obsesses about his parentage. When he suddenly falls ill, his mother visits him by his bedside and gives him a miniature theatre diorama as a gift. It soon becomes clear that she is a noblewoman, who has managed to sneak out of the house where she is kept locked up by her tempestuous husband the Count of Santa Barbara.

Episode 2: The strange former life of Father Dinis is revealed, as well as how he saved Joao from death at the hands of the same man who shot his father. Meanwhile, as the Count of Santa Barbara spreads the lie that Angela left him heartbroken for another man, a mysterious merchant steps forward to defend her honour and halt the gossip spreading through the salons of Lisbon's high society.

Episode 3: A monk sheds light on the mysterious past of Father Dinis, who is shocked by the true identity of merchant Alberto de Magalhaes.

Episode 4: Having discovered that Antonia is not the real sister of Father Dinis, Angela searches for the truth behind her relationship with the priest. As the past unravels, the dark history of her mother comes to light, and the string of misfortunes that plagued her for the rest of her life.

Episode 5: Father Dinis's complicated history is further unravelled as Elisa de Montfort, a woman with an unknown connection to Magalhaes, arrives at the merchant's home to repay a mystery debt. Recognising her as she waits to speak to Alberto's new wife, the priest beckons of her to talk. Flashbacks reveals his extraordinary link to the young visitor, his own story of jealousy and lost love, and the fate that befell Elisa's mother at the hands of one of his closest friends.

Episode 6: Now a student and known as Pedro da Silva, Joao falls into the destructive path of Elisa de Montfort, the daughter of Father Dinis's former lover. She convinces him that the only obstacle to their future together is Alberto de Magalhaes, so he challenges the merchant to a duel.

== Reception ==
Rottentomatoes.com reports 86% approval among 57 film critics of Mysteries of Lisbon. The film holds an 82/100 on Metacritic.

== Accolades ==
=== Won ===
- São Paulo International Film Festival 2010:
  - Critics Award - Best Film
- San Sebastián International Film Festival 2010:
  - Silver Seashell - Best Director: Raúl Ruiz
- Louis Delluc Prize 2010:
  - Louis Delluc Prize for Best Film
- Portuguese Golden Globes 2011:
  - Golden Globe - Best Film
  - Golden Globe - Best Actor: Adriano Luz
  - Golden Globe - Best Actress: Maria João Bastos
- Satellite Awards 2011:
  - Satellite Award for Best Foreign Language Film
- Toronto Film Critics Association Awards 2011:
  - Best Foreign Language Film
- Athens Panorama of European Cinema 2011:
  - Best Film

=== Nominated ===
- San Sebastián International Film Festival 2010:
  - Golden Seashell - Best Film
- Portuguese Golden Globes 2011:
  - Golden Globe - Best Actor: Ricardo Pereira (actor)
  - Golden Globe - Best Actress: Joana de Verona
- London Film Critics Circle Awards 2011:
  - Foreign Language Film of the Year
- National Society of Film Critics Awards 2011:
  - Best Foreign Language Film (2nd place)
- Satellite Awards 2011:
  - Satellite Award for Best Art Direction and Production Design: Isabel Branco
  - Satellite Award for Best Costume Design: Isabel Branco
- Fotogramas de Plata 2012:
  - Best Foreign Film
