= Parisa Bakhtavar =

Iranian film and television director

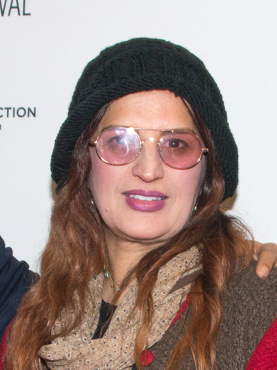
- Bakhtavar in 2018
- Born: 2 February 1972 (age 53); Tehran, Iran
- Occupation: Film director
- Years active: 1992–present
- Spouse: Asghar Farhadi (m. 1990)
- Children: Sarina; Saghar

Parisa Bakhtavar (Persian: پریسا بخت‌آور) is an Iranian film and television director born on August 16, 1972, in Tehran, Iran.

== Biography ==
She is best known for her television series Poshte Konkooriha, which follows the lives of high school seniors studying for their college entrance exams. In 2008, Bakhtavar directed Tambourine, which is her debut film that features an ensemble cast. She is married to Iranian film director Asghar Farhadi.

== Filmography ==
=== Film ===
- Tambourine (2008)

=== Television ===
- Auntie Sara (1992)
- Childhood Notes (2001)
- Poshte Konkooriha (2002)
- I'm A Tenant (2004)
