= Silver Bear for Best Actress =

Discontinued award presented by the Berlin International Film Festival

- Silberner Bär/Beste Darstellerin (German)
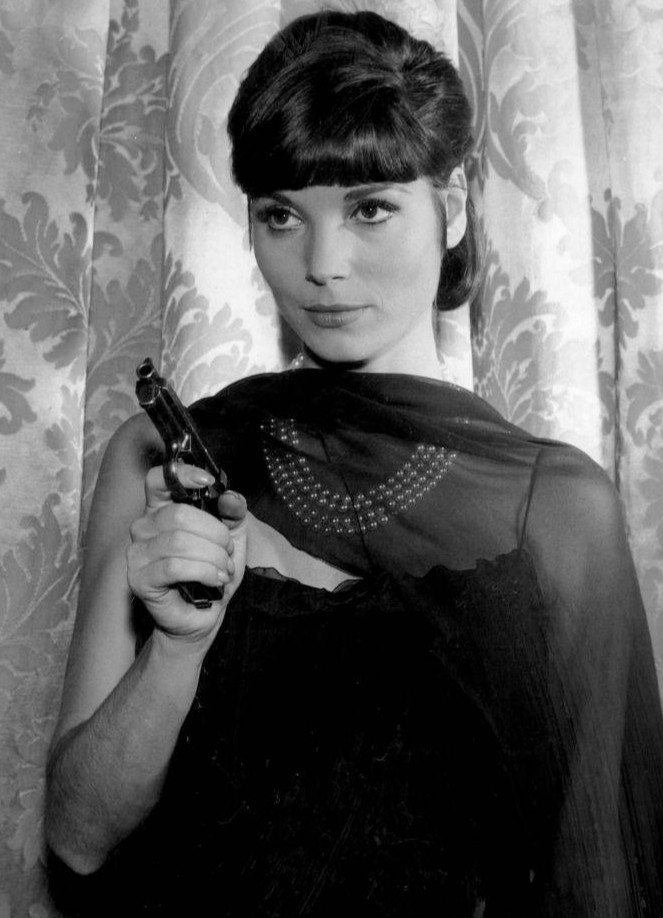
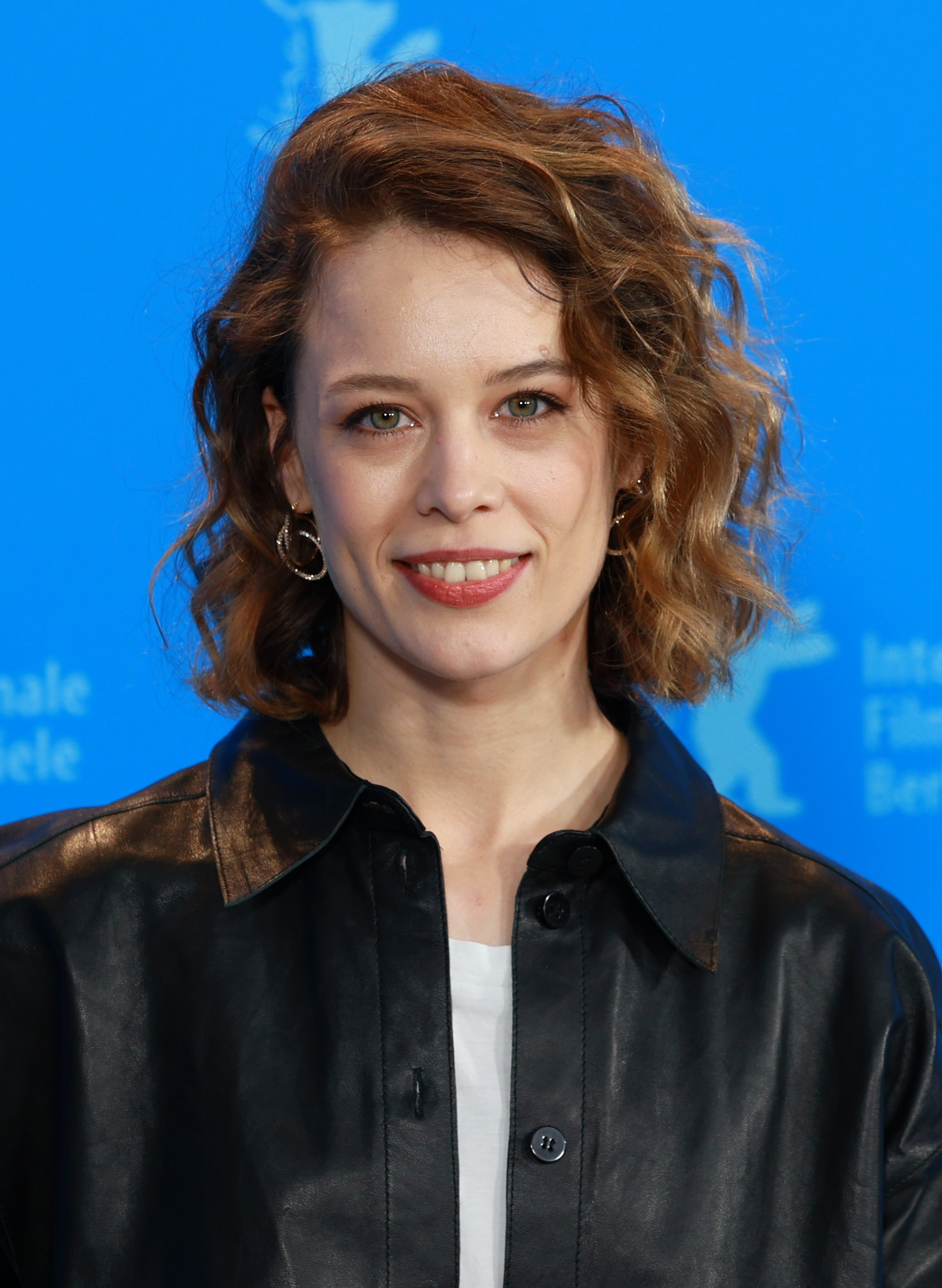
- The first and the last Silver Bear for Best Actress winner: Elsa Martinelli (1956) and Paula Beer (2020)
- Awarded for: Best Performance by an Actress
- Country: Germany
- Presented by: Berlin International Film Festival
- First award: 1956
- Final award: 2020
- Currently held by: Paula Beer; Undine (2020)
- Website: www.berlinale.de

The Silver Bear for Best Actress (German: Silberner Bär/Beste Darstellerin) was an award presented at the Berlin International Film Festival from 1956 to 2020. It was given to an actress who has delivered an outstanding performance and was chosen by the International Jury from the films in the Competition slate at the festival. Beginning with the 71st Berlin International Film Festival, the award was replaced with two gender-neutral categories, Silver Bear for Best Leading Performance and Silver Bear for Best Supporting Performance.

At the 6th Berlin International Film Festival held in 1956, Elsa Martinelli was the first winner of this award for her performance in Donatella, and Paula Beer was the last winner in this category for her role in Undine at the 70th Berlin International Film Festival in 2020. Shirley MacLaine is the only actress to win the award twice, in 1959 for Ask Any Girl and in 1971 for Desperate Characters. Sandra Hüller, the 2006 winner for Requiem, had won Silver Bear for Best Leading Performance in 2026 for Rose.

== History ==
The award was first presented in 1956 and could be for lead or supporting roles. The prize was not awarded on four occasions (1969, 1973–74, and 1990). In 1970, no awards were given as the festival was called off mid-way due to the controversy over the official selection film, o.k. by Michael Verhoeven, which led to the resignation of the international jury. In 2011, the entire female cast of A Separation received the award. Shirley MacLaine has won the most awards in this category, with two.

Sachiko Hidari is the only actress to win a joint award for her roles in two different films in the same competition; she won in 1964 for her performances in The Insect Woman and She and He.

The last of this award was given out in 2020, after which it was replaced with gender-neutral categories, Best Leading Performance and Best Supporting Performance, the following year.

== Winners ==
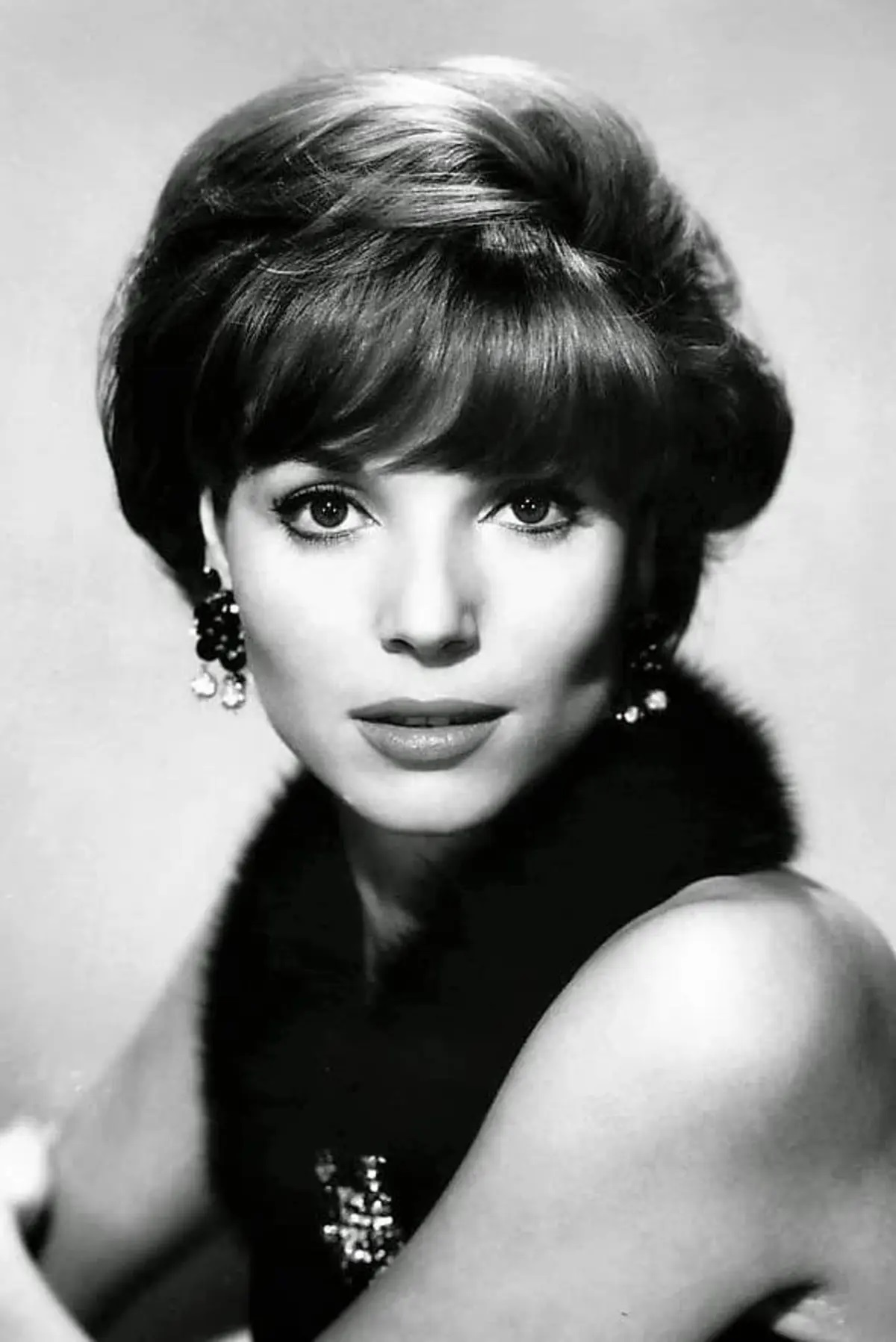
Elsa Martinelli, the first recipient of this award for Donatella (1956)

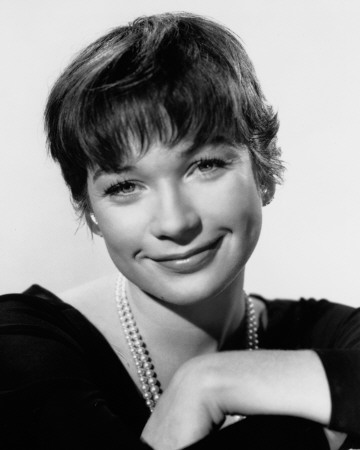
Shirley McLaine won twice for Ask Any Girl (1959), and Desperate Characters (1971)

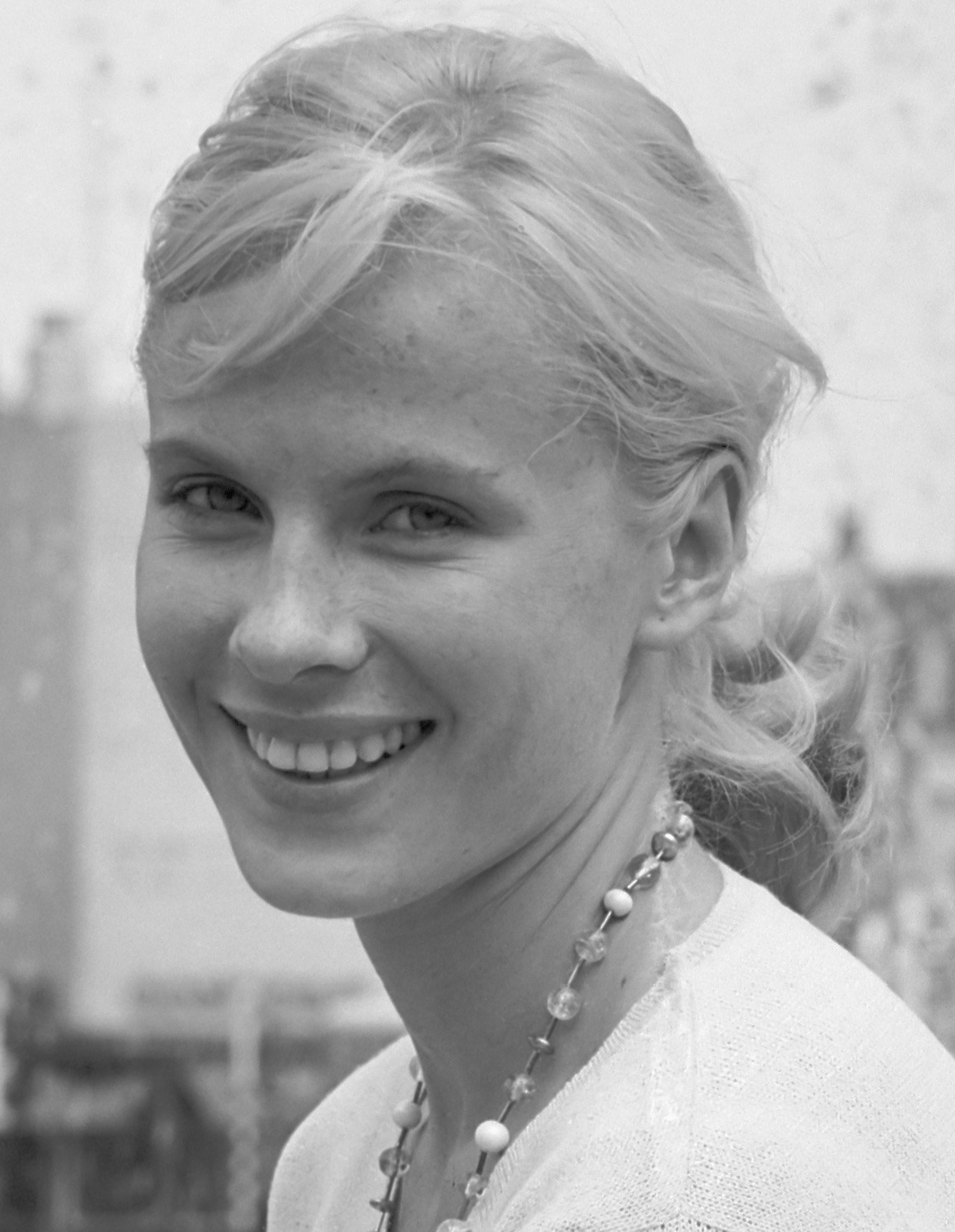
Bibi Andersson won for The Mistress (1962)

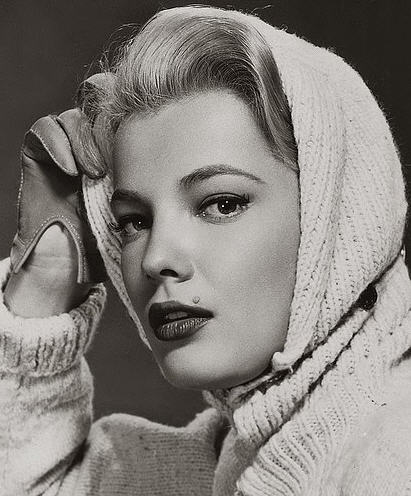
Gena Rowlands won for Opening Night (1977)

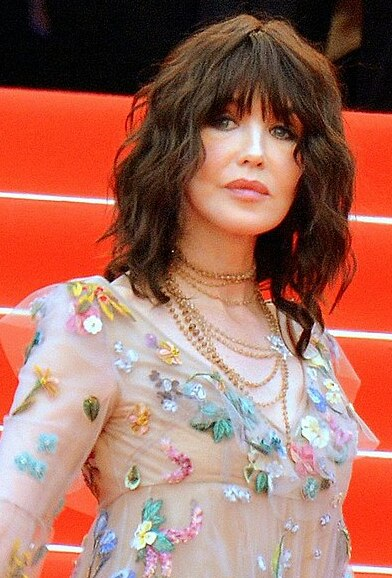
Isabelle Adjani won for Camille Claudel (1988)

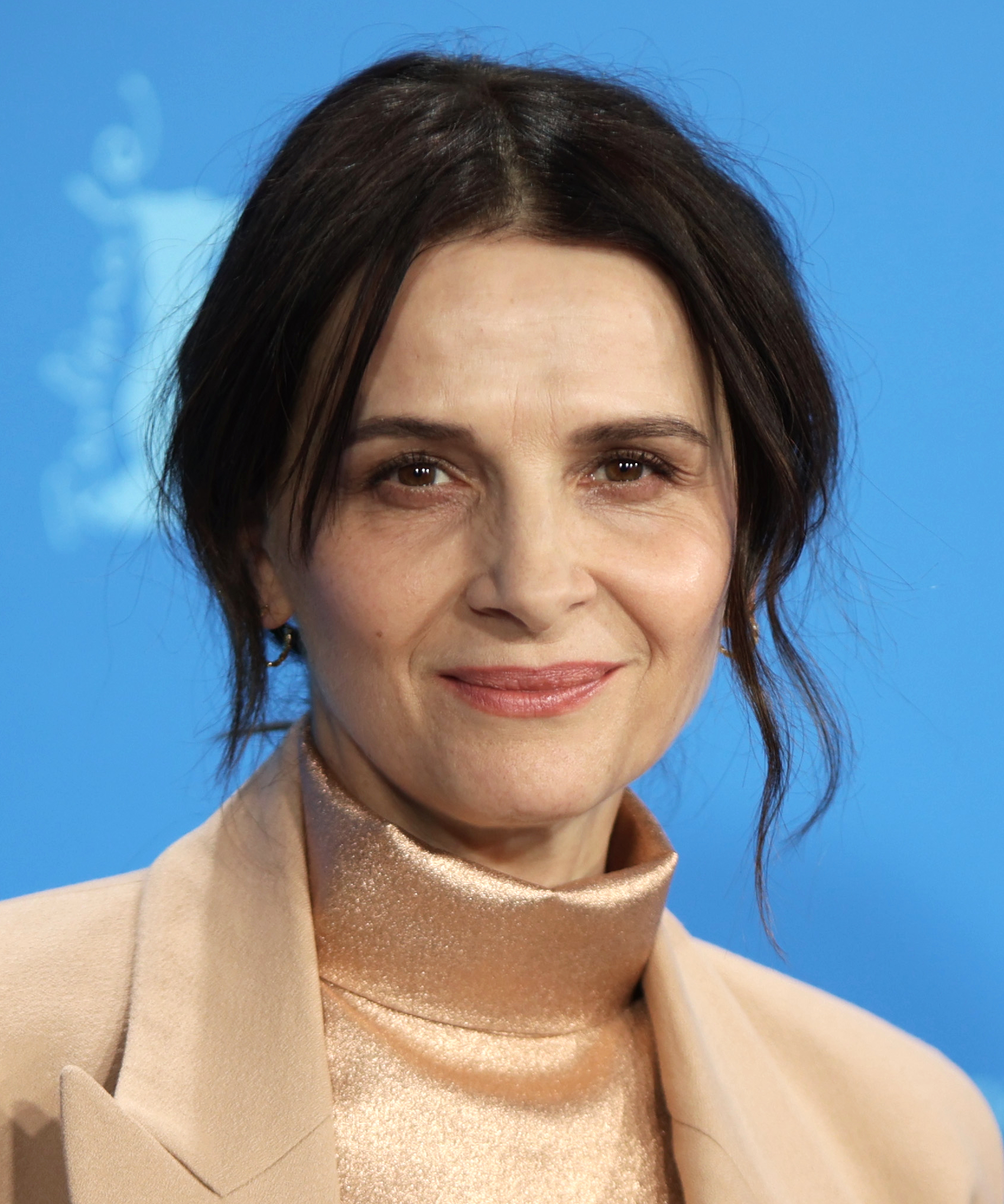
Juliette Binoche won for The English Patient (1996)

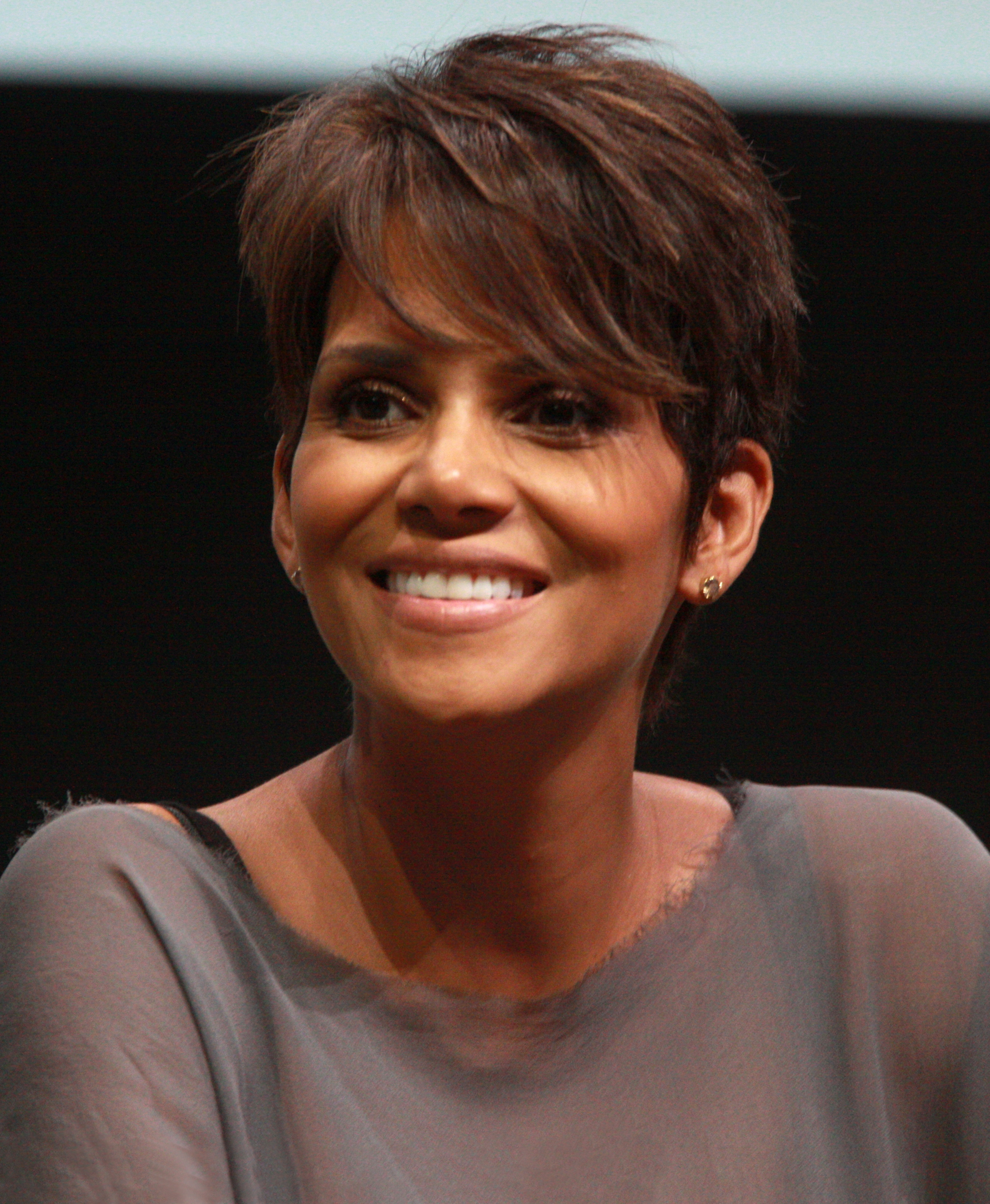
Halle Berry won for Monsters Ball (2001)

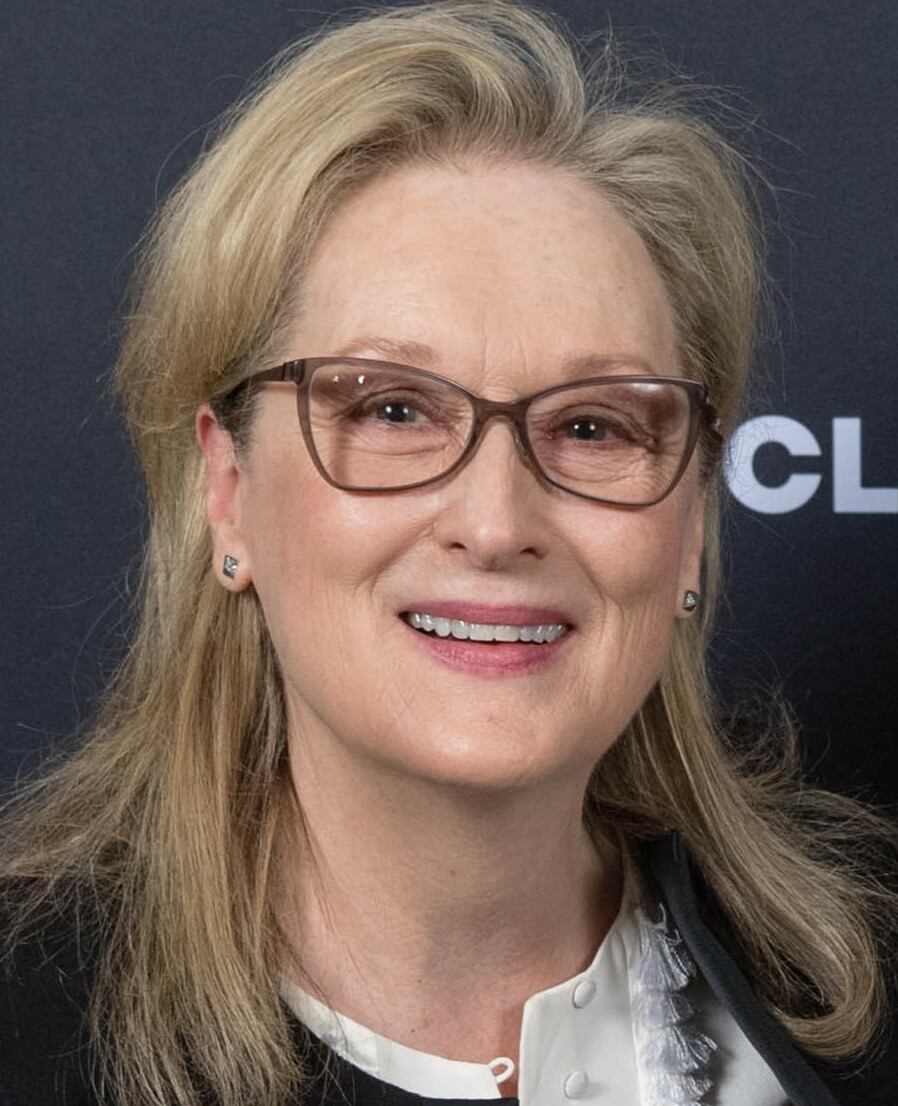
Meryl Streep won with her co-stars Nicole Kidman and Julianne Moore for The Hours (2002)

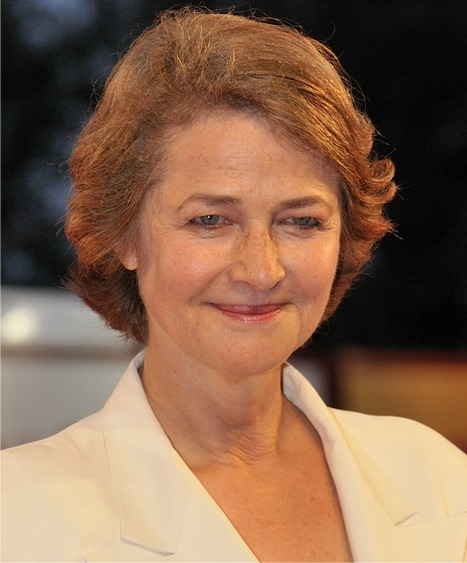
Charlotte Rampling won for 45 Years (2015)

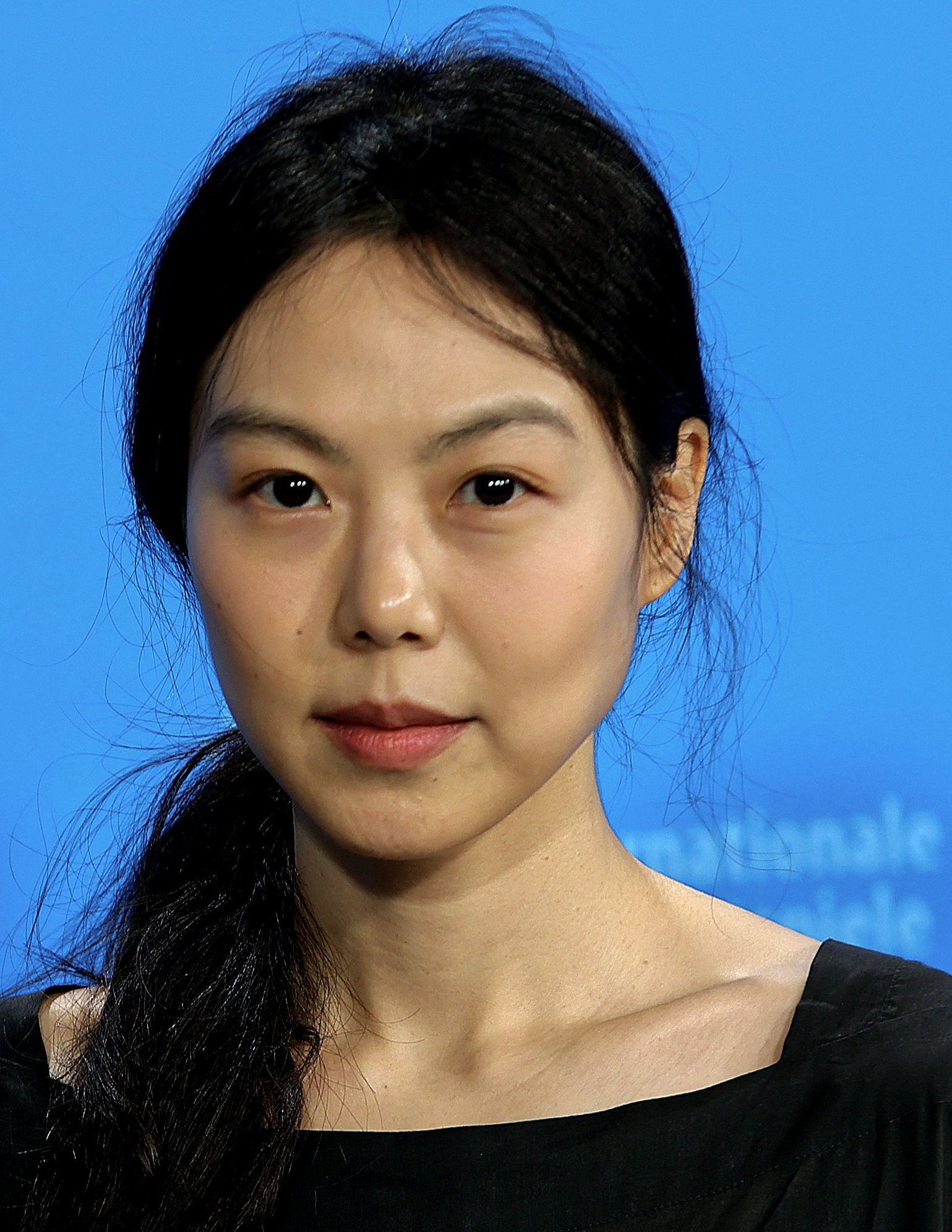
Kim Min-hee won for On the Beach at Night Alone (2017)

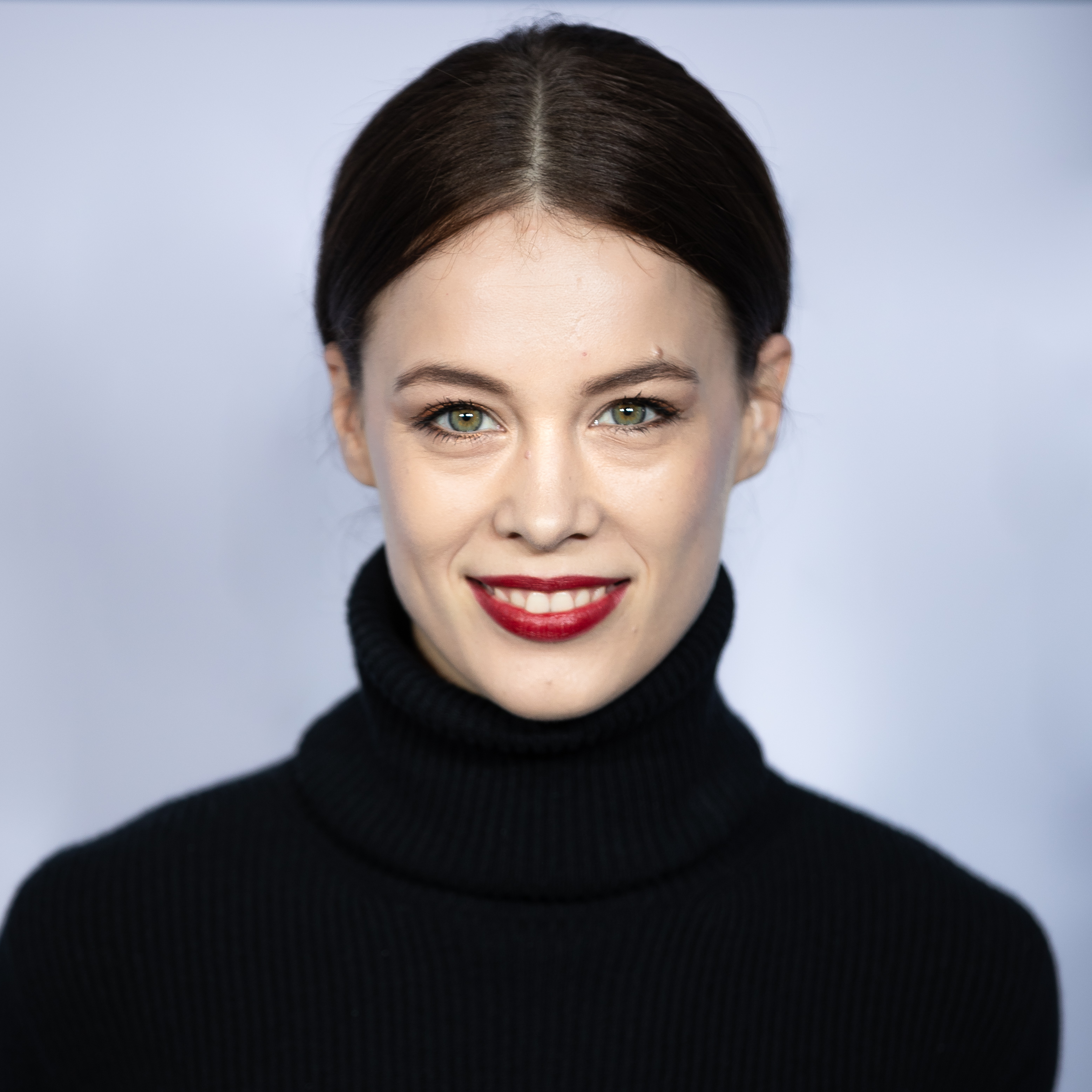
Paula Beer, the last winner of the Berlin Film Festival Award for Best Actress in 2020

=== 1950s ===
Year	Actress	Role(s)	English Title	Ref.
1956	Elsa Martinelli	Donatella	Donatella	
1957	Yvonne Mitchell	Amy Preston	Woman in a Dressing Gown	
1958	Anna Magnani	Gioia	Wild Is the Wind	
1959	Shirley MacLaine	Meg Wheeler	Ask Any Girl	

=== 1960s ===
Year	Actress	Role(s)	English Title	Ref.
1960	Juliette Mayniel	Annette	The Fair	
1961	Anna Karina	Angela Récamier	A Woman Is a Woman	
1962	Rita Gam	Estelle Rigault	No Exit	
1962	Viveca Lindfors	Inès Serrano	No Exit	
1963	Bibi Andersson	The Girl	The Mistress	
1964	Sachiko Hidari ^{[A]}	Tome Matsuki	The Insect Woman	
1964	Sachiko Hidari ^{[A]}	Naoko Ishikawa	She and He	
1965	Madhur Jaffrey	Manjula	Shakespeare Wallah	
1966	Lola Albright	Marie Greene	Lord Love a Duck	
1967	Edith Evans	Maggie Ross	The Whisperers	
1968	Stéphane Audran	Frédérique	Les Biches	

=== 1970s ===
Year	Actress	Role(s)	English Title	Ref.
1971	Shirley MacLaine	Sophie Bentwood	Desperate Characters	
1971	Simone Signoret	Clémence Bouin	Le Chat	
1972	Elizabeth Taylor	Jimmie Jean Jackson	Hammersmith Is Out	
1975	Kinuyo Tanaka	Osaki Yamakawa	Sandakan No. 8	
1976	Jadwiga Barańska	Barbara Niechcic	Nights and Days	
1977	Lily Tomlin	Margo Sperling	The Late Show	
1978	Gena Rowlands	Myrtle Gordon	Opening Night	
1979	Hanna Schygulla	Maria Braun	The Marriage of Maria Braun	

=== 1980s ===
Year	Actress	Role(s)	English Title	Ref.
1980	Renate Krößner	Ingrid “Sunny” Sommer	Solo Sunny	
1981	Barbara Grabowska	Kama	Fever	
1982	Katrin Sass	Nina Kern	Bürgschaft für ein Jahr	
1983	Yevgeniya Glushenko	Vera Silkova	Love by Request	
1984	Inna Churikova	Vera Nikolaevna	Wartime Romance	
1985	Jo Kennedy	Mary	Wrong World	
1986	Marcélia Cartaxo	Macabéa	Hour of the Star	
1986	Charlotte Valandrey	Nadia	Red Kiss	
1987	Ana Beatriz Nogueira	Vera Bauer	Vera	
1988	Holly Hunter	Jane Craig	Broadcast News	
1989	Isabelle Adjani	Camille Claudel	Camille Claudel	

=== 1990s ===
Year	Actress	Role(s)	English Title	Ref.
1991	Victoria Abril	Luisa	Lovers	
1992	Maggie Cheung	Ruan Lingyu	Center Stage	
1993	Michelle Pfeiffer	Lurene Hallett	Love Field	
1994	Crissy Rock	Maggie Conlan	Ladybird, Ladybird	
1995	Josephine Siao	May Sun	Summer Snow	
1996	Anouk Grinberg	Marie Abarth	My Man	
1997	Juliette Binoche	Hana	The English Patient	
1998	Fernanda Montenegro	Isadora Teixeira	Central Station	
1999	Juliane Köhler	Lilly Wust (Aimée)	Aimée & Jaguar	
1999	Maria Schrader	Felice Schragenheim (Jaguar)	Aimée & Jaguar	

=== 2000s ===
Year	Actress	Role(s)	English Title	Ref.
2000	Bibiana Beglau	Rita Vogt	The Legend of Rita	
2000	Nadja Uhl	Tatjana	The Legend of Rita	
2001	Kerry Fox	Claire	Intimacy	
2002	Halle Berry	Leticia Musgrove	Monster's Ball	
2003	Nicole Kidman	Virginia Woolf	The Hours	
2003	Julianne Moore	Laura Brown	The Hours	
2003	Meryl Streep	Clarissa Vaughan	The Hours	
2004	Catalina Sandino Moreno	María Álvarez	Maria Full of Grace	
2004	Charlize Theron	Aileen Wuornos	Monster	
2005	Julia Jentsch	Sophie Scholl	Sophie Scholl – The Final Days	
2006	Sandra Hüller	Michaela Klingler	Requiem	
2007	Nina Hoss	Yella Fichte	Yella	
2008	Sally Hawkins	Pauline "Poppy" Cross	Happy-Go-Lucky	
2009	Birgit Minichmayr	Gitti	Everyone Else	

=== 2010s ===
Year	Actress	Role(s)	English Title	Ref.
2010	Shinobu Terajima	Shigeko Kurokawa	Caterpillar	
2011	Leila Hatami ^{[B]}	Simin	A Separation	
2011	Sareh Bayat ^{[B]}	Razieh	A Separation	
2011	Sarina Farhadi ^{[B]}	Termeh	A Separation	
2011	Kimia Hosseini ^{[B]}	Somayeh	A Separation	
2012	Rachel Mwanza	Komona	War Witch	
2013	Paulina García	Gloria Cumplido	Gloria	
2014	Haru Kuroki	Taki Nunomiya	The Little House	
2015	Charlotte Rampling	Kate Mercer	45 Years	
2016	Trine Dyrholm	Anna	The Commune	
2017	Kim Min-hee	Young-hee	On the Beach at Night Alone	
2018	Ana Brun	Chela	The Heiresses	
2019	Yong Mei	Wang Liyun	So Long, My Son	

=== 2020s ===
Year	Actress	Role(s)	English Title	Ref.
2020	Paula Beer	Undine Wibeau	Undine	

== Multiple winners ==
The following actress is the only person to have received multiple Best Actress awards:

Wins	Actress	Nationality	Films
2	Shirley MacLaine	United States	Ask Any Girl (1959), Desperate Characters (1971)

== See also ==
- Cannes Film Festival Award for Best Actress
- Volpi Cup for Best Actress
- Academy Award for Best Actress
- Academy Award for Best Supporting Actress

== Notes ==
A: Performer to receive a joint award which honor the outstanding work in multiple different films in the same official competition slate.
B: The entire male and female cast of A Separation (جدایی نادر از سیمین) was recipient of this award.
