= Dayere Zangi =

Dayere Zangi دایره‌زنگی
- Directed by: Parisa Bakhtavar
- Written by: Asghar Farhadi
- Produced by: Jamal Sadatian
- Starring: Baran Kowsari; Saber Abar; Mehran Modiri; Mohammad Reza Sharifinia; Hamed Behdad; Amin Hayai; Bahareh Rahnama; Omid Rohani; Gohar Kheirandish; Nima Shahrokh Shahi
- Cinematography: Morteza Poursamadi
- Edited by: Hayedeh Safiyari
- Music by: Amir Tavassoli
- Distributed by: Boshra Film
- Release date: 19 March 2008
- Running time: 110 minutes
- Country: Iran
- Language: Persian
- Budget: Boshra Film
- Box office: Rial5,233,183,000

Dayere Zangi (transl. Tambourine) (Persian: دایره‌زنگی, romanized: Dayereh-ye Zangi) is a 2008 Iranian comedy drama film directed by Parisa Bakhtavar and written by Asghar Farhadi. It was released in Iran during the Nowrooz holidays and was an average gross.

== Story ==
Shirin (Baran Kowsari), is a young woman, who has only one day to make a lot of money fast, in order to repair her father's car she has damaged in an accident. She befriends a naive young man named Mohammad (Saber Abar) who tries to help her raise the money by entering an apartment building and installing illegal satellite dishes for the diverse residents with diverging views on media. That is when they get into further trouble.

== Cast ==
- Baran Kowsari
- Saber Abar
- Mehran Modiri
- Mohammad Reza Sharifinia
- Hamed BehdadAmin Hayai
- Bahareh Rahnama
- Omid Rohani
- Gohar Kheirandish
- Nima Shahrokh Shahi
- NiloofarKhoshkholgh
- Negar Foroozandeh
- Akram Mohammadi
- Amir Noori
- Mahdi Pakdel
- Afarin Chitsaz
- Sarina Farhadi
- Soroosh Goodarzi
- Kianoosh Gerami
- Mohsen Ghazi Moradi
- Melika Sharifinia
