= Sarina Farhadi =

Iranian actress

- سارینا فرهادی
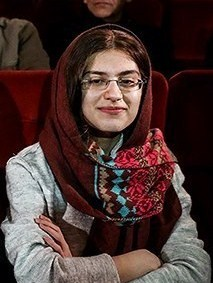
- Farhadi in 2017
- Born: 27 April 1998 (age 28); Isfahan, Iran
- Occupation: Actress
- Years active: 2002–present
- Parent(s): Asghar Farhadi (father); Parisa Bakhtavar (mother)

Sarina Farhadi (Persian: سارینا فرهادی; born 27 April 1998) is an Iranian actress. Born to filmmakers Asghar Farhadi and Parisa Bakhtavar, she is best known for her performance as Termeh in the acclaimed drama film A Separation (2011), which earned her a Silver Bear for Best Actress jointly with the female cast.

== Career ==
In 2011, she won Silver Bear for Best Actress at Berlin International Film Festival for her role in her father's film A Separation, as Termeh. She also won the FIPRESCI Award for best actress along with Leila Hatami and Sareh Bayat at the Palm Springs International Film Festival for her role as Termeh.

== Filmography ==
=== Film ===
| Year | Title | Role | Director |
|---|---|---|---|
| 2008 | Tambourine | Razaghi's Daughter | Parisa Bakhtavar |
| 2011 | A Separation | Termeh | Asghar Farhadi |
| 2021 | A Hero | Nazanin | Asghar Farhadi |

=== Television ===
| Year | Title | Role | Director | Network |
|---|---|---|---|---|
| 2002 | Poshte Konkooriha | Ramin's Daughter | Parisa Bakhtavar | IRIB TV5 |

== Awards and nominations ==
| Award | Year | Category | Nominated work | Result |
|---|---|---|---|---|
| Berlin International Film Festival | 2011 | Best Actress | A Separation | Won |
| Fajr Film Festival | 2011 | Best Actress in a Supporting Role | A Separation | Nominated |
| Palm Springs International Film Festival | 2012 | FIPRESCI Award - Best Actress | A Separation | Won |
