= Asghar Farhadi =

Iranian film director and screenwriter (born 1972)

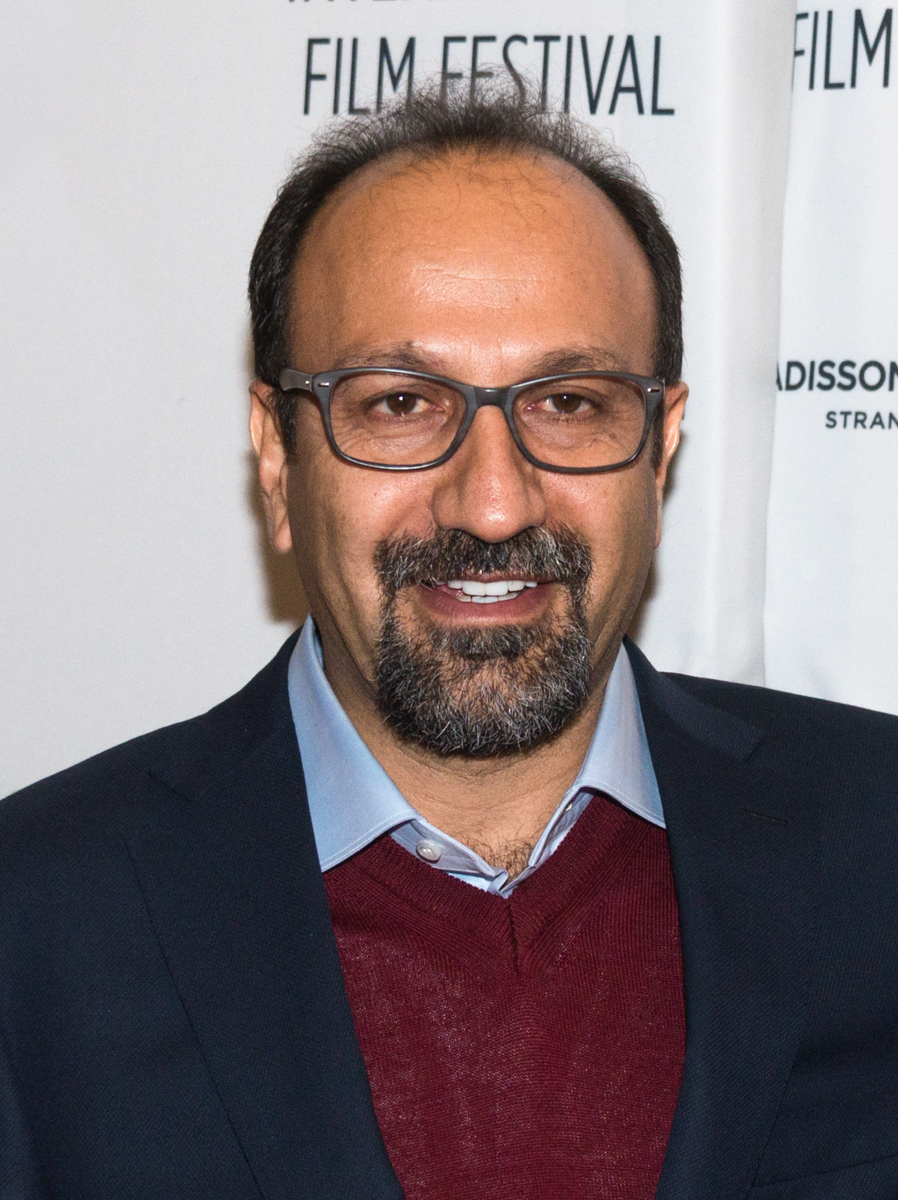
- Farhadi at the 2018 Stockholm International Film Festival
- Born: 7 May 1972 (age 54); Homayoon Shahr, Iran (now Khomeyni Shahr, Iran)
- Education: University of Tehran; Tarbiat Modares University
- Occupations: Film director; screenwriter; film producer
- Years active: 1997–present
- Notable work: About Elly (2009); A Separation (2011); The Past (2013); The Salesman (2016); Everybody Knows (2018); A Hero (2021)
- Spouse: Parisa Bakhtavar (m. 1990)
- Children: 2, including Sarina Farhadi

Asghar Farhadi (Note: Persian: اصغر فرهادی [æsˈɢæɾ ɛ fæɾhɑːˈdiː]) (born 7 May 1972) is an Iranian film director and screenwriter. He is considered one of the most prominent filmmakers of Iranian cinema as well as world cinema in the 21st century. His films have gained recognition for their focus on the human condition, and portrayals of intimate and challenging stories of internal family conflicts for which he has received many international accolades including two Academy Awards, a Golden Bear, and a Prix du scénario among others. In 2012, he was included on the annual Time 100 list of the most influential people in the world. That same year, he also received the Legion of Honour from France.

Farhadi made his directorial film debut with the drama Dancing in the Dust (2003), followed by The Beautiful City (2004) and Fireworks Wednesday (2006). He gained acclaim for his film About Elly (2009) earning a Silver Bear for Best Director. He became one of the few directors worldwide to have won the Academy Award for Best International Feature Film twice, for the family drama A Separation (2011) and the moral drama The Salesman (2016), the latter of which also received the Cannes Film Festival Award for Best Screenplay.

He also earned acclaim for his films The Past (2013), which was filmed in France, and Everybody Knows (2018), which was filmed in Spain. Farhadi returned to Iran with A Hero (2021), which earned him the Cannes Film Festival's Grand Prix.

== Early life and education ==
Farhadi was born in Homayoon Shahr, a city located in the Isfahan province near the city of Isfahan. At the age of 15, in 1987, he joined the Isfahan branch office of the Iranian Youth Cinema Society, which had been established 4 years earlier and he made several short films. He is also a graduate of theatre, with a BA in dramatic arts and MA in stage direction from University of Tehran and Tarbiat Modares University, respectively.

== Career ==
=== 2003–2009: Rise to prominence ===
At the start of his career, Farhadi made numerous short 8 mm and 16 mm films in the Isfahan branch of the Iranian Young Cinema Society before moving on to writing plays and screenplays for IRIB. He also directed such TV series as A Tale of a City and co-wrote the screenplay for Ebrahim Hatamikia's Low Heights. In 2003, Farhadi made his feature film debut with Dancing in the Dust about a man having trouble raising money for his marriage dowry installements. Deborah Young of Variety praised Farhadi as an emerging filmmaker writing, "Dispensing with heavyhanded symbolism, Farhadi tells the tale engrossingly and with a lot of physicality through the two main actors". The film earned Farhadi a nomination at the 25th Moscow International Film Festival and three awards at the Asia-Pacific Film Festival including Best Director, Best Screenplay and Best Supporting Actor for Faramarz Gharibian.

Farhadi's sophomore effort was The Beautiful City about a man celebrating his 18th birthday in a detention center while being in prison for murder.

The film won praise for Farhadi's intricate commentary on Iran's Islamic judicial system. Ronnie Scheib of Variety wrote, "Farhadi launches a simple-seeming quest through all manner of obstacles and complications, each detour greatly altering the nature of the journey". Farhadi won the Grand Prix at the Warsaw Film Festival. With his third film, Fireworks Wednesday, Farhadi won the Gold Hugo at the 2006 Chicago International Film Festival. Set amongst the days before the Persian New Year, people set off fireworks following an ancient Zoroastrian tradition. A domestic dispute ensues. Geoff Andrew of Time Out declared, "What distinguishes the film is the way Farhadi keeps us guessing from as to what exactly is happening and why; repeatedly shifting our point of view, he forces us to question our assumptions about characters and their reliability. This compelling, corrosive account of male-female relationships in today's Tehran is tempered by genuine compassion for the individuals concerned; wisely, Farhadi never serves judgement on them in their troubled pursuit of truth, love and happiness. Intelligent, illuminating and directed with unflashy expertise."

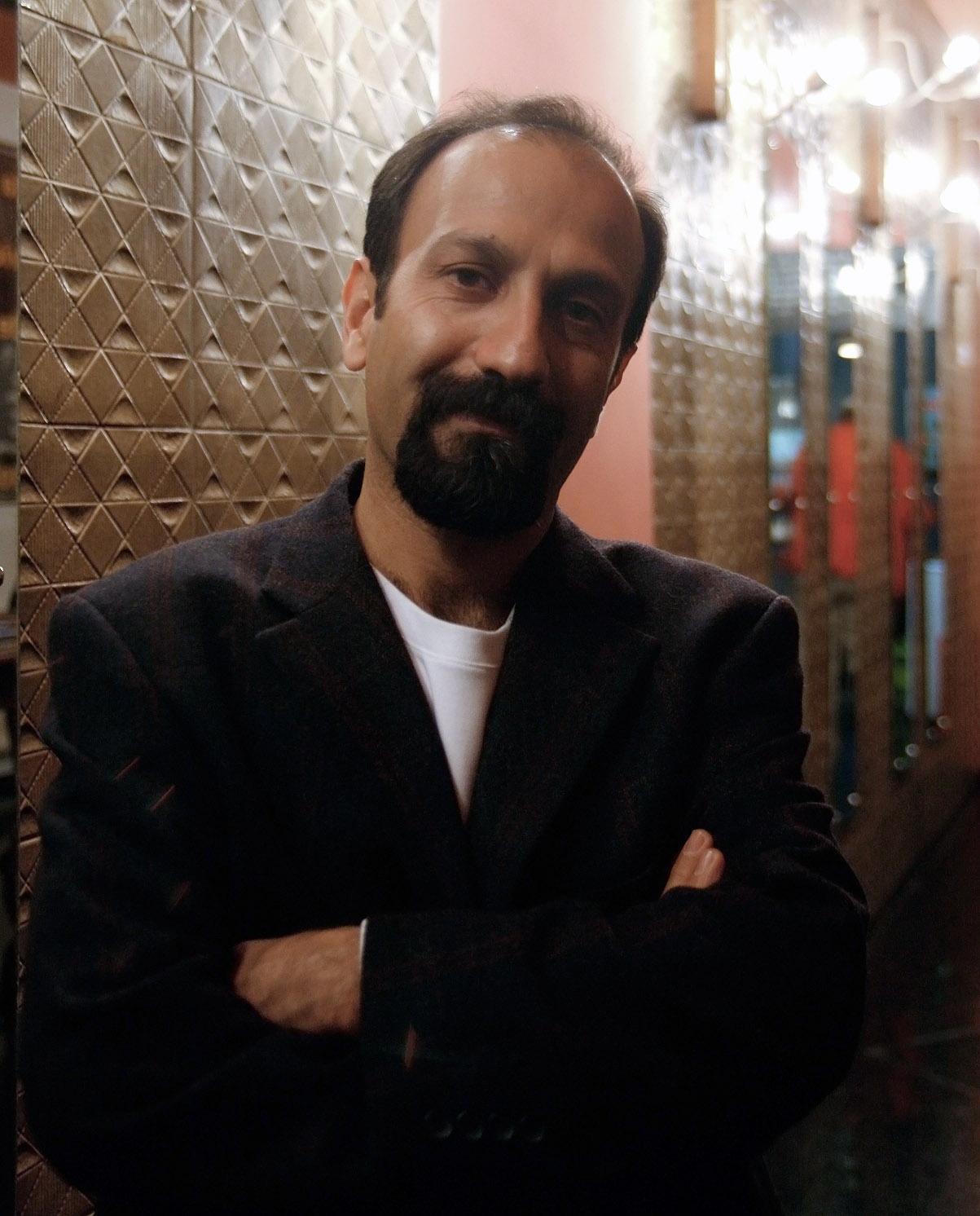
Farhadi in 2009

In 2009, Farhadi directed his fourth film, About Elly which tackles middle-class families in Iran. The film earned critical acclaim with Peter Bradshaw of The Guardian describing it as "an absorbing picture, powerfully acted, disturbing and suspenseful". He also compared the film to Roman Polanski's Knife in the Water (1962) and Michaelangelo Antonioni's L'Avventura (1960) adding, "Farhadi also has Michael Haneke's beady eye for the dynamics and symptoms of group guilt." The film won Farhadi the Silver Bear for Best Director at the 59th International Berlin Film Festival and also Best Picture at the Tribeca Film Festival. The latter film is about a group of Iranians who take a trip to the Iranian beaches of Caspian Sea that turns tragic. Film theorist and critic David Bordwell has called About Elly a masterpiece.

=== 2011–2016: Breakthrough and acclaim ===
His film A Separation premiered on 9 February 2011 at the 29th Fajr International Film Festival in Tehran and received critical acclaim from the Iran Society of Film Critics. It earned Farhadi four awards, including Best Director (for the third time after Fireworks Wednesday and About Elly). On 15 February 2011, it also played in competition at the 61st Berlin International Film Festival, which received a Golden Bear for best film, becoming the first Iranian film to win that award. In June 2011, A Separation won the Sydney Film Prize in competition with The Tree of Life, directed by Terrence Malick. It also won the Best Film award at the 2011 Asia Pacific Screen Awards. Roger Ebert praised the Farhadi's on his nuanced depiction of Iranian culture writing, "[He] provides a useful portrait of Iran today. Some inflamed American political rhetoric has portrayed it as a rogue nation eager to start nuclear war...this film portrays a more nuanced nation, and its decent characters are trying to do the right thing. To untangle right and wrong in this fascinating story is a moral challenge." Bob Mondello of NPR also praised Farhadi writing, "Consider[ing] how heavily censored filmmakers are in Iran, director Asghar Farhadi's accomplishment starts to seem downright astonishing". Mondello described the film as "a beautifully crafted [and] fascinating film".

On 19 December 2011, Farhadi was announced as being a jury member for the 62nd Berlin International Film Festival, which was held in February 2012. On 15 January 2012, A Separation won the Golden Globe for the Best Foreign Language Film. The film was also the official Iranian submission for the Best Foreign Language Film at the 2012 Academy Awards where, in addition to being nominated in this category, it was also nominated in the Best Original Screenplay category. On 26 February 2012, A Separation became the first Iranian movie to win the Academy Award for Best International Feature Film, at the 84th Academy Awards. This marked Farhadi as the first Iranian to have won an Academy Award in any competitive category. Farhadi also received praised for his film from Steven Spielberg, David Fincher, Meryl Streep and Woody Allen. He was invited to join the Academy of Motion Picture Arts and Sciences in June 2012, along with 175 other members. A Separation also won the César Award for Best Foreign Film and the Independent Spirit Award for Best International Film in 2012.

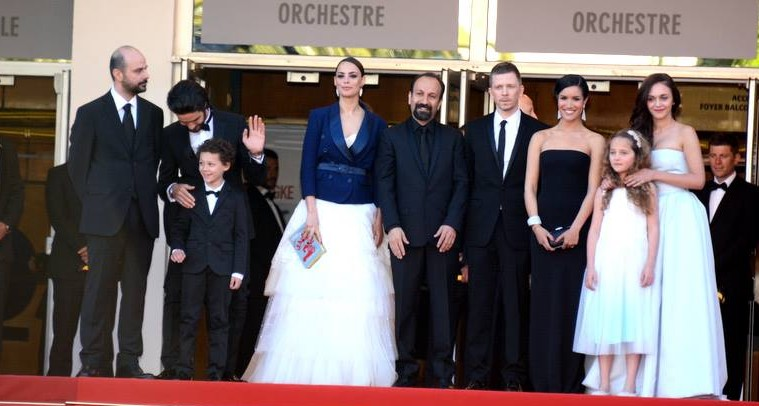
Farhadi, Berenice Bejo and the cast of The Past at the 2013 Cannes Film Festival

In 2013, Farhadi's film The Past starring Bérénice Bejo and Tahar Rahim was released. This would be Farhadi's first film in the French language. The film competed for the Palme d'Or at the 2013 Cannes Film Festival. Bejo won the Best Actress Award at Cannes for her performance in the film. The film received critical acclaim. It holds a 93% rating on review aggregator website Rotten Tomatoes, based on 144 reviews with a weighted average score of 8.2/10 and the site's consensus: "Beautifully written, sensitively directed, and powerfully acted, The Past serves as another compelling testament to Asghar Farhadi's gift for finely layered drama." On Metacritic, the film has a score of 85 out of 100 based on 41 reviews. The film received a Golden Globe Award for Best Foreign Language Film and was selected as the Iranian entry for the Best Foreign Language Film at the 86th Academy Awards, but it was not nominated.

His 2016 film The Salesman, starring Shahab Hosseini and Taraneh Alidoosti, competed for the Palme d'Or at the 2016 Cannes Film Festival, where it won two awards: Best Actor for Shahab Hosseini and Best Screenplay for Farhadi. The film revolves around a married couple whose life is upended after the wife is assaulted. The husband attempted to find the attacker while she struggles to cope with post-traumatic stress. During this the husband attempts to perform Arthur Miller's 1949 play Death of a Salesman on stage. Farhadi chose Miller's play as his story within a story based on shared themes. He also compared the film to the George Stevens film A Place in the Sun (1951). The film was a co-production between Iran and France, the film was shot in Tehran, beginning in 2015. David Sims of The Atlantic praised Farhadi writing, "Rather, he wants to explore the terrifying speed with which conflict can disrupt our mundane lives, and the unconscious need we possess to slip into more outsized roles." Sims added "The Salesman is a typically wrenching film one that morphs from a quiet family drama to a low-key tale of revenge, and is all the more impressive for how seamlessly it executes that shift."

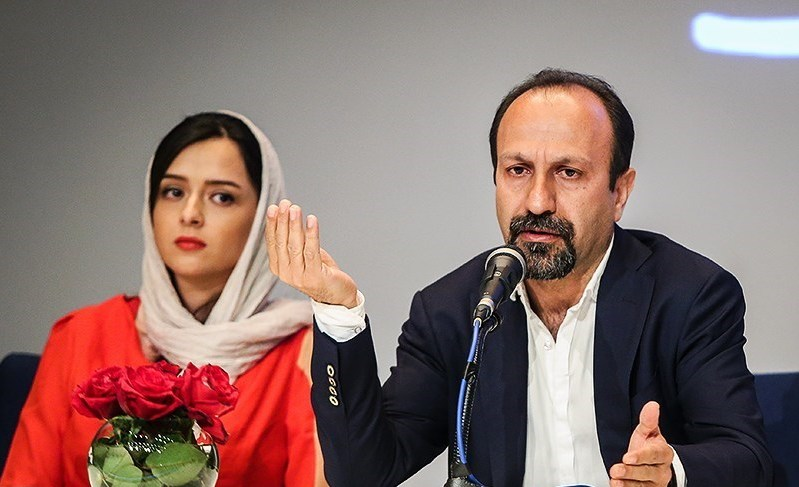
Farhadi at a press conference for The Salesman (2016)

On 26 February 2017, Farhadi won his second Oscar for Academy Award for Best International Feature Film for The Salesman at the 89th Academy Awards. The Salesman had already won the award for the Best Screenplay at the Cannes Film Festival. Following the then President of the United States of America Donald Trump's executive order barring Iranians from entering the country, Farhadi said he would not attend the 2017 Academy Awards, despite being nominated and winning for the best foreign-language film. He announced that two prominent Iranian Americans, Anousheh Ansari and Firouz Naderi would represent him in the ceremony. Anousheh Ansari is famed for being the first female space tourist and first Iranian in space, and Naderi as director of Solar Systems Exploration at NASA. A few hours before the ceremony, he addressed a group of protesters in London via a video link from Iran. The Mayor of London, Sadiq Khan, screened the movie publicly in Trafalgar Square as a celebration of the city's diversity. "This solidarity is off to a great start", he told them. "I hope this movement will continue and spread, for it has within itself the power to stand up to fascism, be victorious in the face of extremism and say no to oppressive political powers everywhere."

After winning the Academy Award for the second time, Farhadi had a prepared statement read by Anousheh Ansari. "I'm sorry I'm not with you tonight", Farhadi's statement read. "My absence is out of respect for the people of my country and those of the other six nations who have been disrespected by the inhumane law that bans entry of immigrants to the U.S. Dividing the world into us and our enemies categories creates fear, a deceitful justification for aggression and war. These wars prevent democracy and human rights in countries that have been victims of aggression. Filmmakers can turn their cameras to capture shared human qualities and break stereotypes of various nationalities and religions. They create empathy between us and others -- an empathy that we need today more than ever." Before the ceremony, all five directors nominated for foreign language film issued a joint statement, obtained by USA Today, that condemned "the climate of fanaticism and nationalism" in the United States, among other countries. The directors – Farhadi, Maren Ade (Toni Erdmann), Hannes Holm (A Man Called Ove), Martin Zandvliet (Land of Mine) and Bentley Dean and Martin Butler (Tanna) – said that no matter which film wins, the Oscar is dedicated to "all the people, artists, journalists and activists who are working to foster unity and understanding, and who uphold freedom of expression and human dignity – values whose protection is now more important than ever."

=== 2018–present ===
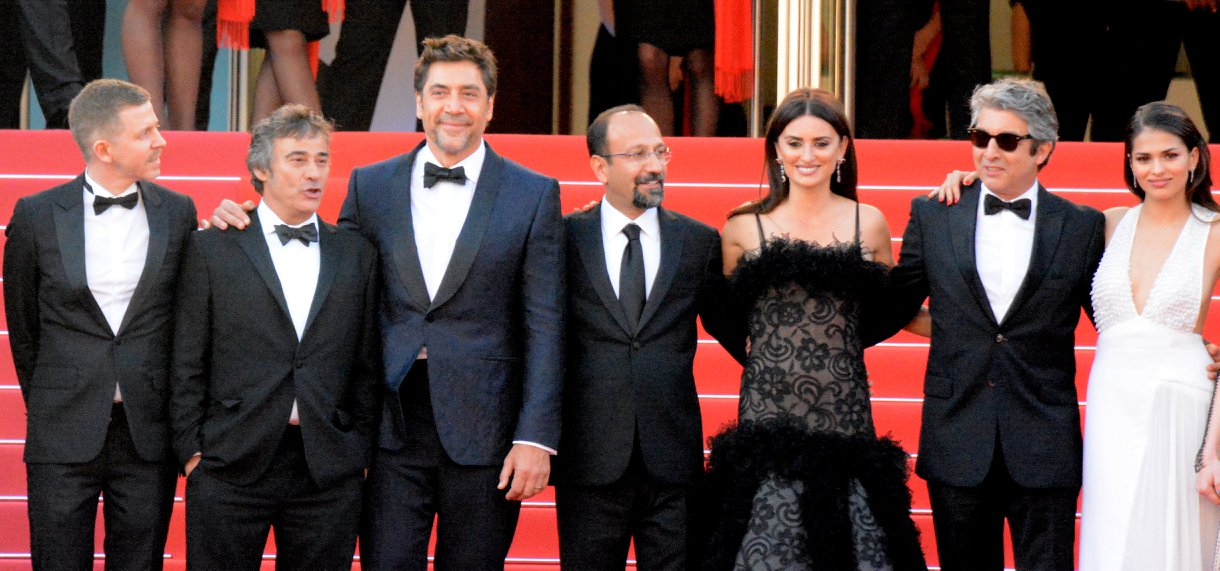
Javier Bardem, Penélope Cruz, Farhadi, and the cast of Everybody Knows at the 2018 Cannes Film Festival

In 2018, Farhadi directed his eighth feature film titled, Everybody Knows starring Javier Bardem, Penélope Cruz and Ricardo Darin. The film, a Spanish psychological thriller, debuted at the 71st Cannes Film Festival where it played in the competition for the Palme d'Or. At the Toronto premiere of Everybody Knows, the director shared with Ikon London Magazine his plans to "Come to London West End with his play". He said "I know there is a lot of great plays every day. And I wish one day I do a play there. It is not far. It is our plan." The film has earned critical acclaim earning a 78% on Rotten Tomatoes, with critics praising the two leads but adding that the film is below Farhadi's usually high standards.

A Hero is Farhadi's 9th feature film. Alexandre Mallet-Guy co-produced the work. This film was shot in Marvdasht, Iran, and narrates a social theme. In this film, Amir Jadidi, Mohsen Tanabandeh, Fereshteh Sadre Orafaee, Sarina Farhadi and Sahar Goldoust play roles. The film was introduced as the representative of Iranian cinema on 20 October 2021, to compete in the 94th Academy Awards.

In April 2022, The Hollywood Reporter mistakenly reported that Farhadi had been found guilty, when in fact he was indicted by an Iranian court on charges of plagiarism for allegedly stealing the premise for A Hero from an earlier documentary made by Azadeh Masihzadeh, a former film student of Farhadi. In October 2022, The New Yorker published an article, which included more information about the case and exclusive interviews with those who had previously worked with Farhadi. The case came before the criminal court; if he had been convicted, Farhadi could have faced up to three years in prison. In March 2024, an Iranian court issued a verdict acquitting Farhadi of the plagiarism allegations, based on the review by several University of Tehran copyright law experts and other experts.

On 3 February 2026, Farhadi was among several figures in the Iranian film industry who signed a statement supporting the 2025–2026 Iranian protests and condemning the government's response to them.

Farhadi presented his new film Parallel Tales in competition at the 2026 Cannes Film Festival.

During the festival, he condemned both the bombing of civilians in Iran and the repression of demonstrators, describing these events as “extremely cruel and tragic.

== Themes ==
=== Social and class structures ===
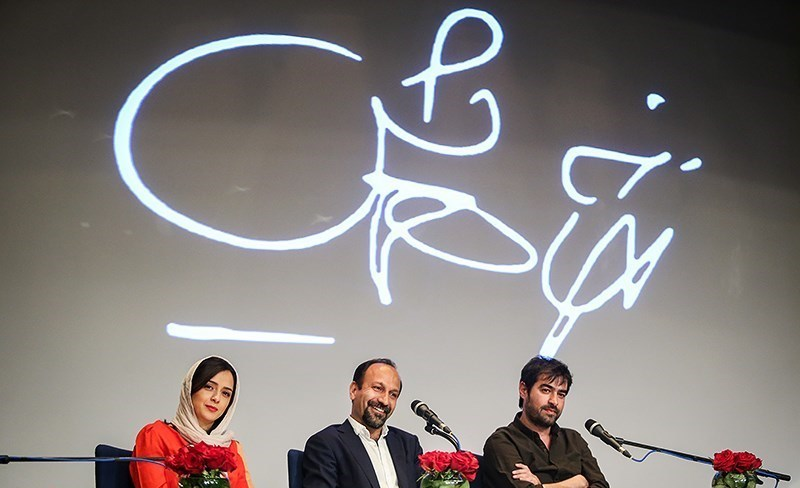
Farhadi in a The Salesman's press conference. Taraneh Alidoosti on his right and Shahab Hosseini on his left.

Farhadi's films present a microcosm of modern Iran and explore the inevitable complications that arise via class, gender, and religious differences. For example, his 2011 film A Separation portrays various intractable conflicts and arguments that force the characters to reflect on the moral grounds of their own decisions.

In her article, "Through the Looking Glass: Reflexive Cinema and Society in Post-Revolution Iran", Norma Claire Moruzzi writes:

In contrast, Farhadi's A Separation treats the life-as-elsewhere dream as one strand of a complex and multi-layered story. Farhadi's films are nuanced portraits of the cross-cutting relations among classes, genders, and social groups. They are ambivalent explorations of small personal choices' implications on the delicate web of individual connections that make up any social network, carefully crafted and beautifully acted.

The film critic Roger Ebert in his Movie Yearbook 2013, writes this about Farhadi's craft depicting social relations:

"The writer-director, Asghar Farhadi, tells his story with a fair and even hand. His only agenda seems to be to express empathy. A Separation provides a good portrait of Iran today . . . [T]his film portrays a more nuanced nation, and its decent characters are trying to do the right thing" (532). "The intriguing thing about his screenplay is that it gets us deeply involved, yet never tells us who it thinks is right or wrong" (703).

In the introduction to her 2014 book Asghar Farhadi: Life and Cinema, film critic Tina Hassannia writes:

[Farhadi's] social realism—observations on the culture at large driven through a documentary-like lens—is skilfully effaced by a highly refined version of the melodrama. Yet his social commentary—though bleak, sometimes damning—never feels didactic or punishing.

In Farhadi's films, Iran is depicted as having a rigid class system that endures across the history of pre- and post-revolutionary Iran. Farhadi films the complexities of everyday life in contemporary Iran, focusing on how diverse perspectives are embedded within social structures such as class and gender. Farhadi has his style like "open ending movies", being realistic and "narrative gaps".

=== Cultural norms ===
Farhadi's films frequently criticize divisions in Iranian society along class, gender and religious lines. However, they are notable for their subtlety of treatment. Farhadi himself has never rejected Iran, most of his films are deeply rooted in urban Iranian society, and he has frequently expressed his commitment to the country and its people, most notably on the two occasions he won the Academy Award. When he picked up the award for A Separation, he dedicated the win to the Iranian nation. When The Salesman won the prize a few years later, Farhadi declined to attend the event in protest of the Trump travel ban.

What is less noticed is his veiled criticism of religious standards in Iran. His debut feature Dancing in the Dust opens with the Islamic invocation Bismillahir Rahmanir Rahim (In the name of Allah, the most benevolent, the most merciful) just as a hand cleans a car window to reveal a large statue of a man, situated on a pedestal in the street. Idolatry is forbidden in Islam, and the construction of human statues is likewise discouraged in strict interpretations. For his second film, Beautiful City, Farhadi repeated a similar cinematic trick; as a prison loudspeaker blares out the Bismillah phrase, it is revealed that a young man is carving human figurines. Neither film has been released in the West, and they have not been seen as widely as his latter films.

== Influences ==
In 2012, Farhadi participated in that year's Sight & Sound film polls. Held every ten years to select the greatest films of all time, contemporary directors were asked to select ten films. Farhadi's choices are listed below:

- Rashomon (Japan, 1950)
- The Big Road (China, 1935)
- The Godfather (US, 1972)
- Tokyo Story (Japan, 1953)
- The Apartment (US, 1960)
- Three Colors: Red (France, 1994)
- Take the Money and Run (US, 1969)
- Persona (Sweden, 1966)
- Taxi Driver (US, 1976)
- Modern Times (US, 1936)

== Accusation of plagiarism ==
In 2022, The New Yorker reported allegations of Farhadi plagiarizing many of his films' ideas, and stealing from students of a workshop he mentored decades earlier. Farhadi denied the allegations addressing them at the 2022 Cannes Film Festival when he served as a juror.

In March 2024, an Iranian court issued a verdict acquitting Farhadi of the plagiarism allegations, based on the review by several University of Tehran copyright law experts and other experts.

== Filmography ==
=== Feature films ===
Year	English Title	Original Title	Director	Writer	Producer	Notes
2003	Dancing in the Dust	رقص در غبار	Yes	Yes	No	
2004	The Beautiful City	شهر زیبا	Yes	Yes	No	
2006	Fireworks Wednesday	چهارشنبه‌ سوری	Yes	Yes	No	
2009	About Elly	درباره الی	Yes	Yes	Yes	
2011	A Separation	جدایی نادر از سیمین	Yes	Yes	Yes	
2013	The Past	Le passé / گذشته	Yes	Yes	No	French language debut
2016	The Salesman	فروشنده	Yes	Yes	Yes	
2018	Everybody Knows	Todos lo saben	Yes	Yes	No	Spanish language debut
2021	A Hero	قهرمان	Yes	Yes	Yes	
2026	Parallel Tales	Histoires Parallèles	Yes	Yes	Yes	

=== Other credits ===
Year	English Title	Original Title	Notes
2002	Low Heights	ارتفاع پست	Only writer, co-written with Ebrahim Hatamikia
2007	Canaan		Only writer, co-written with Mani Haghighi
2008	Tambourine	دایره زنگی	Only writer
2009	Trial on the Street	محاکمه در خیابان	Only writer, co-written with Masoud Kimiai

=== Television ===
Year	Title	Director	Writer	Producer	Broadcast
1998	The Waiter	Yes	Yes	Yes	IRIB TV5
1998	Doctors	No	No	Yes	IRIB TV3
1998	Farrokh & Faraj Residential Complex	Yes	No	No	IRIB TV2
1999	Youthful Days	No	No	Yes	IRIB TV5
1999	A Tale of a City	Yes	Yes	Yes	IRIB TV5
2001	A Tale of a City II	Yes	Yes	Yes	IRIB TV5

== Awards and honors ==
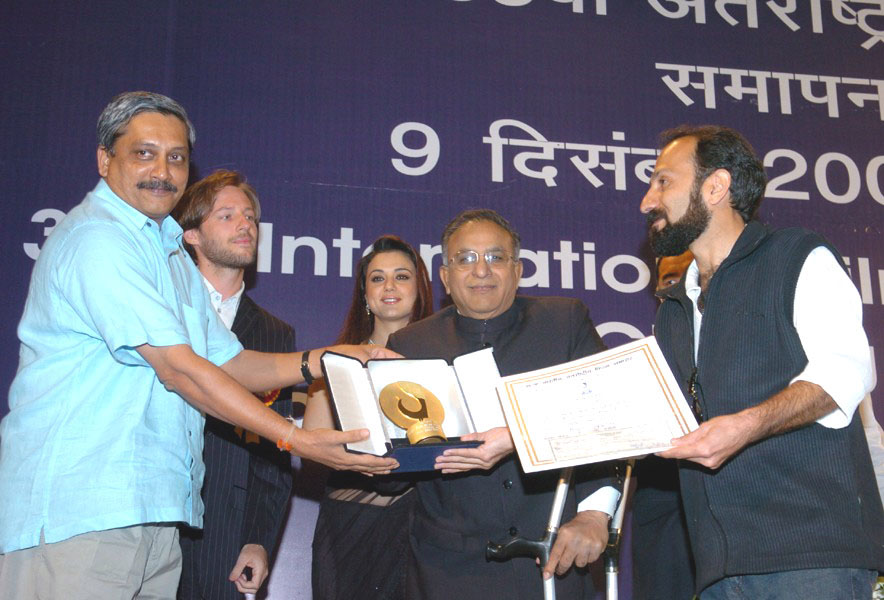
Farhadi receiving Golden Peacock Award for his film Beautiful City, at IFFI (2004)

Farhadi is one of a select list of directors who have won the Best Foreign Film Oscar more than once. The others are Vittorio de Sica and Federico Fellini (four times each), Ingmar Bergman (three times), and René Clément and Akira Kurosawa (twice each). The following is a selection of his major awards. A Separation won the Academy Award for Best Foreign Language Film in 2012, becoming the first Iranian film to win the award. The film was nominated for the Academy Award for Best Original Screenplay. The Salesman won the Academy Award for Best Foreign Language Film in 2017. However, Farhadi did not attend the 89th Academy Awards ceremony in protest of the U.S. Executive Order 13769. A Hero won the Hafez Award for Best Director – Motion Picture and Best Screenplay – Motion Picture (both original and adapted) in 2021.

Honors

- Legion of Honour French (2012)
- Listed at #75 in Foreign Policy's Top 100 Global Thinkers (2012)

== Critical reception ==
Year	Title	Rotten Tomatoes	Metacritic
2003	Dancing in the Dust	N/A	N/A
2004	The Beautiful City	92% (12 reviews)	69% (8 reviews)
2006	Fireworks Wednesday	100% (45 reviews)	84% (18 reviews)
2009	About Elly	99% (72 reviews)	87% (29 reviews)
2011	A Separation	99% (177 reviews)	95% (41 reviews)
2013	The Past	92% (156 reviews)	85% (41 reviews)
2016	The Salesman	96% (196 reviews)	85% (36 reviews)
2018	Everybody Knows	78% (180 reviews)	68% (38 reviews)
2021	A Hero	97% (187 reviews)	82% (39 reviews)

== See also ==
- Massoud Farasati
- Cinema of Iran
- Persian cinema
