= List of Iranian films of the 2010s =

A list of films produced in Iran ordered by year of release in the 2010s. For an alphabetical list of Iranian films see Category:Iranian films

Year	Title	Director	Producer	Actors	Genre	Notes
2010	Certified Copy	Abbas Kiarostami				
2010	Farewell Baghdad	Mehdi Naderi	DEFC		Anti-war	Selected as the Iranian entry for the Best Foreign Language Film at the 83rd Academy Awards.
2011	Alzheimer	Ahmad Reza Motamedi	Saeed Sa'di	Faramarz Gharibian	Drama	
2011	A Separation	Asghar Farhadi	Asghar Farhadi	Leila Hatami, Peyman Moaadi, Shahab Hosseini	Drama	official Iranian candidate for the Best Foreign Language Film at the Academy Awards and became the first Iranian film to win the award. first Iranian film won the Golden Bear (at the 61st Berlin International Film Festival)
2011	Salve	Alireza Davoudnejad			Drama	
2011	Persian Gulf	Orod Attarpour (fa)				Documentary first broadcast on National Persian Gulf Day on Channel One of the Islamic Republic of Iran Broadcasting (IRIB).
2012	Dizzy Hits The Bar	Attila Shaaran		Daniel Moorehead	Sports	Daniel Moorehead in one of his foreign language forays (shown at the 30th Fajr International Film Festival.
2012	Iranian horse	Hojjat Baqaee			Real Documentary	Awarded by Ministry of Culture and Guidance of Iran - Equestrian Federation / Guilan Board - Documentary Film Festival on Iranian Horse - Ministry of Agriculture of Iran.
2013	All Alone	Ehsan Abdipour	Edris Abdipour			
2013	The Corridor	Behrouz Shoeibi	Mahmoud Razavi		Qisas	Reza Attaran and Hanieh Tavassoli star in this film that deals in the Islamic concept of Qisas. Hanieh Tavassoli won the crystal simorgh for best actress in a leading role in 31st Fajr International Film Festival.
2014	The Upside-down Triangle	Hossein Rajabian			Drama	
2016	The Salesman	Asghar Farhadi	Alexandre Mallet-Guy, Asghar Farhadi	Shahab Hosseini, Taraneh Alidoosti	Drama	Won Academy Award for Best Foreign Language Film at the 89th Academy Awards
2017	Kupal	Kazem Mollaie		Levon Haftvan, Nazanin Farahani	Drama	Won Jury Award at the "23rd Kolkata International Film Festival 2017", and Best Film at the "34th Bogota Film Festival 2017"
2017	Disappearance	Ali Asgari				
2017	Ava	Sadaf Foroughi				
2017	Lerd	Mohammad rasulof	Reza akhlaghirad-sudabe beyzaei-nasim adabi-bagher yekta		drama	Winner of a kind of look at the Cannes Film Festival - Excellent presence at the Belgian Film Festival-Iranian film festival
2018	Wound of Sepidroud	hojjat baqaee	hojjat baqaee		Social Documentary	Social Documentary Festival]] (2018)
2018	Lord of Water (or King of Water)	Mojtaba Amini				Animation
2019	Skin	Bahman Ark	Mohammad Reza Mesbah		Horror, Drama	Award, Best Film (Art and experience) 38th Fajr Film Festival (2019) Nominated, Best Film (New vision) 38th Fajr Film Festival (2019)
2019	Yalda, a Night for Forgiveness	Massoud Bakhshi	Jacques Bidou, Marianne Dumoulin		Drama	Grand Jury Prize for the World Cinema Dramatic Competition 2020 Sundance Film Festival. Nominations at Berlin and other festivals.
