= List of awards and nominations received by Asghar Farhadi =

Asghar Farhadi awards and nominations
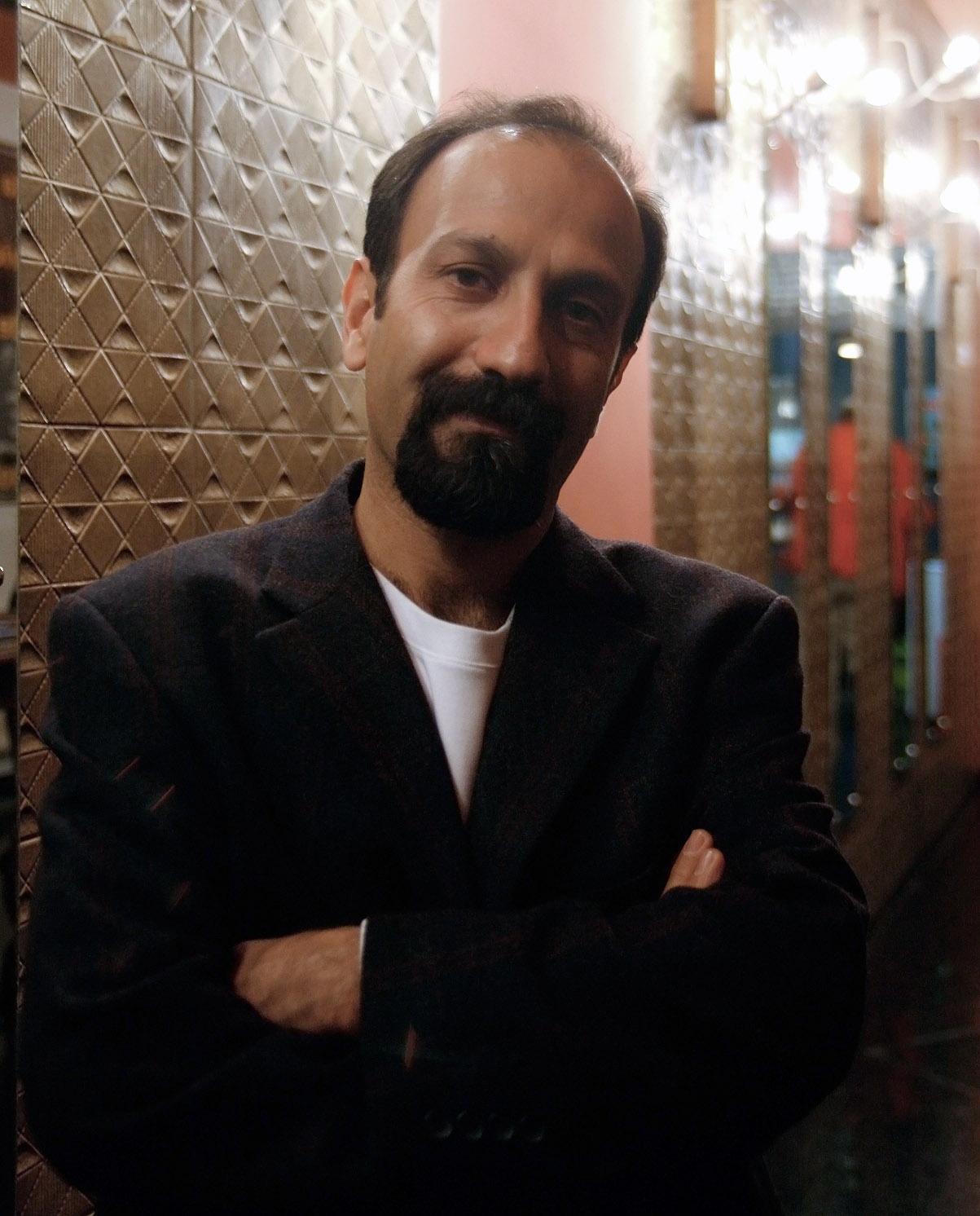
- Farhadi in 2009
Awards and nominations
Award	Wins	Nominations
Academy Awards	0	1
Golden Globes	1	4

Totals (Note: Certain award groups do not simply award one winner. They acknowledge several different recipients, have runners-up, and have third place. Since this is a specific recognition and is different from losing an award, runner-up mentions are considered wins in this award tally. For simplification and to avoid errors, each award in this list has been presumed to have had a prior nomination.)
- Wins: 9
- Nominations: 28

This article is a list of awards and nominations received by Asghar Farhadi.

Asghar Farhadi is an Iranian film director and screenwriter. He has received various accolades including a César Award, a Critics' Choice Movie Award, a Golden Globe Award, and an Independent Spirit Award as well as nominations for an Academy Award and two British Academy Film Awards. Farhadi has won prizes at the Berlin International Film Festival, the Cannes Film Festival, and the Tribeca Film Festival.

In addition to these awards, Farhadi has received awards and nominations from film festivals and organizations all around the world. Farhadi started his career his directorial debut Dancing in the Dust (2003) followed by The Beautiful City (2004) and Fireworks Wednesday (2006). He received acclaim for the drama About Elly (2009) earning the Silver Bear for Best Director at the 59th Berlin International Film Festival. The film was also Iran's official submission for the competition in the Foreign Film section at the 82nd Academy Awards.

Farhadi received widespread acclaim with the family drama-mystery thriller A Separation (2011) for which he was nominated for the Academy Award for Best Original Screenplay. The film earned the Academy Award for Best International Feature Film as well as the César Award, the Critics' Choice Movie Award, the Golden Globe Award, and the Independent Spirit Award for Best International Feature Film as well as a nomination for the BAFTA Award. The film also won two prizes at the 61st Berlin International Film Festival, the Golden Bear and the Prize of the Ecumenical Jury. He then directed the French-Iranian film The Past (2013), which was nominated for the Golden Globe Award for Best Foreign Language Film and was selected as the Iranian entry for the Best Foreign Language Film at the 86th Academy Awards, but it was not nominated.

With the Iranian drama The Salesman (2016), he directed his second film to win the Academy Award for Best International Feature Film. He also earned the Cannes Film Festival Award for Best Screenplay at the 2016 Cannes Film Festival. He directed the Spanish-language crime drama Everybody Knows (2018) which competed for the Palme d'Or at the 2018 Cannes Film Festival. His most recent film, A Hero (2021) won the Grand Prix at the 2021 Cannes Film Festival and was shortlisted for the Academy Award for Best International Feature Film at the 94th Academy Awards and was nominated for the Golden Globe Award and the Critics' Choice Movie Award for Best Foreign Language Film.

== Major associations ==
=== Academy Awards ===
Year	Category	Nominated work	Result	Ref.
2011	Best Original Screenplay	A Separation	Nominated	
2011	Best Foreign Language Film	A Separation	Accepted	
2016	Best Foreign Language Film	The Salesman	Accepted (Note: Farhadi boycotted the ceremony in protest of Executive Order 13769, with engineer Anousheh Ansari accepting the award on Iran's behalf.)	

=== Critics' Choice Awards ===
Year	Category	Nominated work	Result	Ref.
Critics' Choice Movie Awards
2011	Best Foreign Language Film	A Separation	Won	
2013	Best Foreign Language Film	The Past	Nominated	
2016	Best Foreign Language Film	The Salesman	Nominated	
2021	Best Foreign Language Film	A Hero	Nominated	

=== Golden Globe Awards ===
Year	Category	Nominated work	Result	Ref.
2011	Best Foreign Language Film	A Separation	Won	
2013	Best Foreign Language Film	The Past	Nominated	
2016	Best Foreign Language Film	The Salesman	Nominated	
2022	Best Foreign Language Film	A Hero	Nominated	

== Miscellaneous awards ==
Organizations	Year	Category	Work	Result	Ref.
Berlin International Film Festival	2009	Golden Bear	About Elly	Nominated	
Berlin International Film Festival	2009	Silver Bear for Best Director	About Elly	Won	
Berlin International Film Festival	2011	Golden Bear	A Separation	Won	
Berlin International Film Festival	2011	Prize of the Ecumenical Jury	A Separation	Won	
Cannes Film Festival	2013	Palme d'Or	The Past	Nominated	
Cannes Film Festival	2013	Prize of the Ecumenical Jury	The Past	Won	
Cannes Film Festival	2016	Palme d'Or	The Salesman	Nominated	
Cannes Film Festival	2016	Best Screenplay	The Salesman	Won	
Cannes Film Festival	2018	Palme d'Or	Everybody Knows	Nominated	
Cannes Film Festival	2021	Palme d'Or	A Hero	Nominated	
Cannes Film Festival	2021	Grand Prix	A Hero	Won	
César Awards	2012	Best Foreign Film	A Separation	Won	
César Awards	2014	Best Film	The Past	Nominated	
César Awards	2014	Best Director	The Past	Nominated	
César Awards	2014	Best Original Screenplay	The Past	Nominated	
Goya Awards	2019	Best Film	Everybody Knows	Nominated	
Goya Awards	2019	Best Director	Everybody Knows	Nominated	
Goya Awards	2019	Best Original Screenplay	Everybody Knows	Nominated	
Independent Spirit Awards	2012	Best International Film	A Separation	Won	
Toronto International Film Festival	2011	People's Choice Awards	A Separation	Nominated	
Tribeca Film Festival	2009	Best Narrative Feature	About Elly	Won	

== Honorary awards ==
Organizations	Year	Award	Result	Ref.
Sarajevo Film Festival	2026	Honorary Heart of Sarajevo Award	Honoured	
