= Farewell Baghdad =

Farewell Baghdad can refer to:

- Farewell Baghdad (2010 film), a 2010 Iranian film
- Farewell Baghdad (2013 film), a 2013 Israeli film
