= List of Iranian Academy Award winners and nominees =

This is a list of Iranian Academy Award winners and nominees. This list details the performances of Iranian filmmakers, actors, actresses and films that have been nominated or have won an Academy Award.

== Nominations and Winners ==
No. of wins	No. of nominations
4	29

== Best Supporting Actress ==
Actress in a Supporting Role
Year	Name	Film	Status	Milestone / Notes
2003	Shohreh Aghdashloo	House of Sand and Fog	Nominated	First Iranian to be nominated for an acting award.

== Best Original Screenplay ==
Original Screenplay
Year	Name	Film	Status	Milestone / Notes
2012	Asghar Farhadi	A Separation	Nominated	First time that a screenplay entirely written in an Asian language (Persian) is nominated for Original Screenplay.
2026	Jafar Panahi; Shadmehr Rastin; Nader Saïvar; Mehdi Mahmoudian	It Was Just an Accident	Nominated	

== Best Adapted Screenplay ==
Adapted Screenplay
Year	Name	Film	Adapted From	Status	Milestone / Notes
1998	Hossein Amini	The Wings of the Dove	The Wings of the Dove by Henry James	Nominated	First Asian nominated in this category.
2021	Ramin Bahrani	The White Tiger	The White Tiger by Aravind Adiga	Nominated	

== Best Cinematography ==
Cinematography
Year	Name	Film	Status	Milestone / Notes
1997	Darius Khondji	Evita	Nominated	
2022	Darius Khondji	Bardo, False Chronicle of a Handful of Truths	Nominated	
2025	Darius Khondji	Marty Supreme	Nominated	

== Best Costume Design ==
Costume Design
Year	Name	Film	Status	Milestone / Notes
1970	Ray Aghayan	Gaily, Gaily	Nominated	First Iranian to nominate for an Academy Award.
1973	Ray Aghayan	Lady Sings the Blues	Nominated	First Iranian to nominate for an Academy Award twice.
1976	Ray Aghayan	Funny Lady	Nominated	First Iranian to nominate for an Academy Award thrice.

== Best Film Editing ==
Costume Design
Year	Name	Film	Status	Milestone / Notes
2009	John Refoua	Avatar	Nominated	Refoua was born in Iran. Shared with James Cameron and Stephen E. Rivkin.

== Best Sound Editing ==
Sound Editing
Year	Name	Film	Status	Milestone / Notes
2007	Kami Asgar	Apocalypto	Nominated	First and only Middle Eastern person nominated for Sound Editing.

== Best Visual Effects ==
Visual Effects
Year	Name	Film	Status	Milestone / Notes
1997	Habib Zargarpour	Twister	Nominated	Nominated with Stefan Fangmeier, John Frazier and Henry LaBounta.
2001	Habib Zargarpour	The Perfect Storm	Nominated	Nominated with Stefan Fangmeier, John Frazier, Walt Conti.

== Best Animated Feature ==
Animated Feature
Year	Name	Film	Status	Milestone / Notes
2008	Marjane Satrapi	Persepolis	Nominated	Shared nomination with Vincent Paronnaud

== Best International Feature Film ==
Best International Feature Film
Year	Film	Director	Status	Milestone / Notes
1999	Children of Heaven (بچه های آسمان)	Majid Majidi	Nominated	
2012	A Separation (جدایی نادر از سیمین)	Asghar Farhadi	Won	First Iranian movie to win an Oscar.
2017	The Salesman (فروشنده)	Asghar Farhadi	Won	
2025	The Seed of the Sacred Fig (دانه‌ی انجیر معابد)	Mohammad Rasoulof	Nominated	The film was submitted by Germany.
2026	It Was Just an Accident (یک تصادف ساده)	Jafar Panahi	Nominated	The film was submitted by France.

== Best Documentary ==
Academy Award for Best Documentary Feature Film
Year	Name	Film	Status	Milestone / Notes
2026	Sara Khaki and Mohammadreza Eyni	Cutting Through Rocks	Nominated	

== Best Documentary Short Subject ==
Academy Award for Best Documentary (Short Subject)
Year	Name	Film	Status	Milestone / Notes
2019	Rayka Zehtabchi	Period. End of Sentence.	Won	Iranian-American; Shared with Melissa Berton.

== Best Short Film Live Action ==
Live Action Short Film
Year	Name	Film	Status	Milestone / Notes
2000	Mehdi Norowzian	Killing Joe	Nominated	Nominated as Director; Shares nomination with producer, Steve Wax
2015	Talkhon Hamzavi	Parvaneh	Nominated	Nominated as Director; Shares nomination with producer, Stefan Eichenberger
2022	Cyrus Neshvad	The Red Suitcase	Nominated	

== Best Short Film Animated ==
Animated Short Film
Year	Name	Film	Status	Milestone / Notes
2009	Emud Mokhberi	Oktapodi	Nominated	Nominated as Director; Shares nomination with co-director Thierry Marchand,
2023	Yegane Moghaddam	Our Uniform	Nominated	
2024	Shirin Sohani; Hossein Molayemi	In the Shadow of the Cypress	Won	

== See also ==
- List of Iranian submissions for the Academy Award for Best Foreign Language Film
- Cinema of Iran
- List of Asian Academy Award winners and nominees
