= Javad Jalali =

Iranian photographer (born 1977)

جواد جلالی Javad Jalali
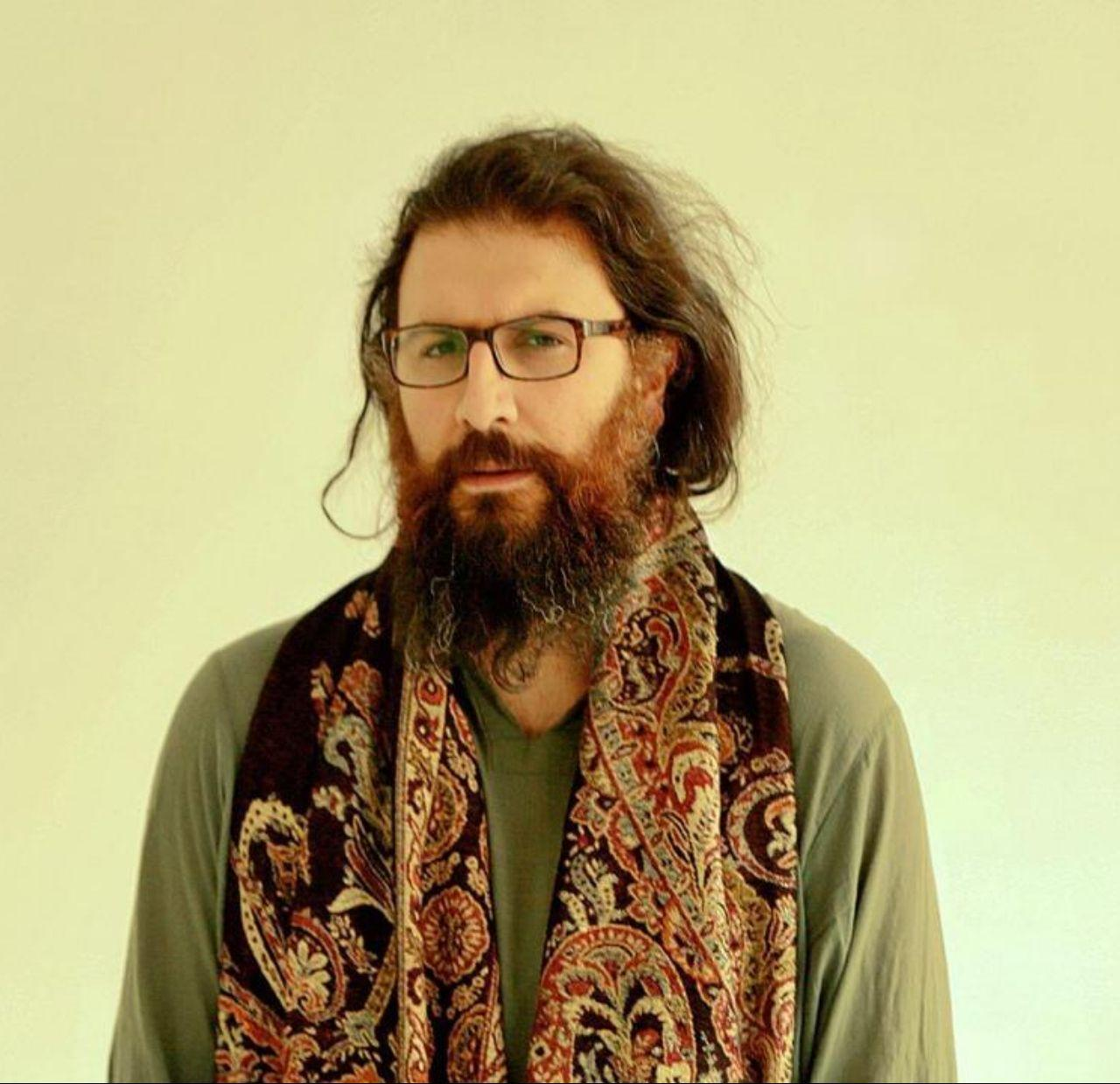
- Born: Javad Jalali; 30 May 1977 (age 49); Mashhad, Iran
- Occupations: Photographer, cinematographer
- Awards: Golden butterfly
- Website: www.javadjalali.com

Javad Jalali (Persian: جواد جلالی) (born 30 May 1977 in Mashhad) is a photographer and a member of the Iranian Alliance of Motion Picture Guilds. His photograph of the movie Farewell Baghdad is now kept in the Iranian Artists Forum in Tehran, Iran. He also holds the record for a photograph sold for the highest amount at a photography expo in Iran (800,000,000 rials).

== Career ==
Jalali is known for his photography of refugees and immigrants of Afghanistan and Kurdistan in Iraq (2008, 2011), mysticism in Iranian architecture (2001), traditional Iranian kilns (2004, 2008, 2011), mentally and physically ill patients (2003, 2004), abstract photography of horses and trees and still photography of films. His photographs have been published in Variety (2012), Real Time Arts (Australia) (2011), L'Uomo Vogue (2011), D Photo Journal (Australia) (2010, 2011), Vogue (Italy) (2010), MyFDB (Italy) (2010), Paradise Magazine (2010), Film International (2010), "World of Cinema" (2008, 2010), Cinema Weekly (2007–2011), Cinema Industry (2008–2011), Film Magazine (2008, 2009, 2010), Picture World (2009, 2010), Ideal Life (2009), Screen Cannes (France) (2009) and Cinemotion (France) (2009).

He was the cameraman for the movie Boghz, which was filmed in Turkey, and directed by Reza Darmishian. Touraj Aslani, the movie's cinematographer, explains that he chose Javad Jalali because of his knowledge and understanding of colors, motions and photography. He added that the movie was filmed using two cameras, either narrating its own look or jump cuts of the movie. This form of filming is a new experience in Iranian cinema. He was also nominated for an award at the Fajr Film Festival for the movie and the behind-the-scenes photography of Aal and Endless Dreams. He was recognized by the jury of the 29th Fajr International Film Festival for Endless Dreams.

For the first time in the history of film photography, one of his photos is kept in the National Museum of the Iranian artist's forum. His collection of picture stories from the movie Farewell Baghdad went on to be displayed in Melat Multiplex. In this exhibition, photographs of the movie and the behind the scene of Farewell Baghdad were shown in photo art format. It was a combination of photographs and the soundtrack of the movie. The photographs alongside the soundtrack were a conceptual event for the audience.

At the 25th Isfahan International Festival of Films for Children & Young Adults, he received a Golden Butterfly for the best photograph of the movie. Javad Jalali received the Crystal Simorgh at 30th Fajr International Film Festival for the best photography of the movie Farewell Baghdad. He received his second Crystal Simorgh at the 32nd Fajr International Film Festival for the best photography of the movie Berlin Minus Seven.

== Awards and honors ==
- Crystal Trophy Award, and diploma best short film story for the film highway 2000
- Nominated for the Academy of Fine Arts Boston
- Nominated for the Academy of Fine Arts France
- Actual Photo Expo theater and Iranian 2011
- Nominated Crystal Phoenix best scene twenty-ninth Fajr Film Festival for the movie Sleep Comet
- Winner, Crystal Simorgh, Best Photo, 30th Fajr International Film Festival for Farewell Baghdad
- Winner, Golden Butterfly, Best Photo, 25th Isfahan International Festival of Films for Children & Young Adults
- Nominee, Crystal Simorgh, Best Photo the scene, 29th Fajr International Film Festival, for Aal
- Nominee, Crystal Simorgh, Best Photo the scene, 29th Fajr International Film Festival, for Endless Dreams
- Nominee, Crystal Simorgh, Best Photo behind the scene, 29th Fajr International Film Festival, for Aal
- Nominee, Best Photo, 15th Iran Cinema Celebration Awards, for Farewell Baghdad
- Winner, Crystal Simorgh, Best Photo, 32nd Fajr International Film Festival for Berlin Minus Seven
- Jury member of 35th Fajr International Film Festival
- Winner, Crystal Simorgh, Best Photo, 36th Fajr International Film Festival for Parinaz
- Jury member of 5th still photographer Khanehcinema festival
