= Maral Baniadam =

Iranian actress (born 1981)

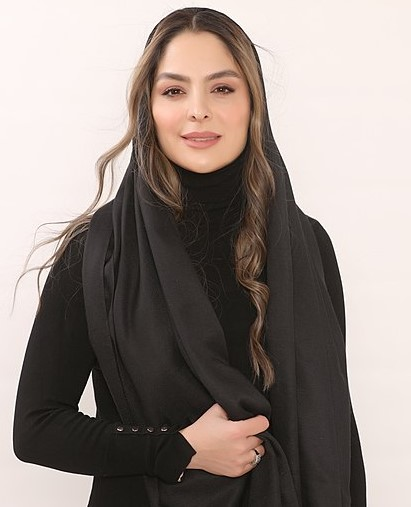
- Baniadam in 2022
- Born: September 20, 1981 (age 44); Tehran, Iran
- Occupation: Actress
- Years active: 2010–present
- Spouse: Ali Sarabi
- Children: 2 (Iliya, Asal)
- Website: Official website

Maral Baniadam (Persian: مارال بنی‌آدم; born September 20, 1981) is an Iranian actress. In 2024, she won the Crystal Simorgh for Best Actress at the 42nd Fajr International Film Festival for her performance as Parvin E'tesami in the biographical film Parvin.

== Early life ==
Maral Baniadam was born on September 20, 1981, in Tehran. She completed an undergraduate course in the field of acting She has a daughter and a son, named Asal and Iliya respectively.

== Career ==
As an actress, she started her career in theatre and completed acting training courses held under supervision of Mahtab Nasirpour in Canada. In early stage of her career, she played in “Drought and Lies” (directed by Pedram Alizadeh) and Oscar winner film, The Salesman (directed by Asghar Farhadi) Among other films she played as an actress is “Gisum” and In the Arms of the Tree screened in 38th Fajr Film Festival As a theatre actress, Maral Baniadam has also performed in plays such as “The Other Side of the Mirror”, “Bernard Died” and “God of Carnage” directed by Ali Sarabi.

She has also played in the short film The Small Panda, the Big Panda directed by Sahar Khoshnam. She also played the role of “Sara”, one of the influencing roles, in The Accomplice with actors Hedyeh Tehrani and Parviz Parastui.

She was selected as a player and played in Asghar Farhadi's The Salesman following a 2-minute video sent to Farhadi. Then she played “Delbar” in Gisum film produced by Saeed Sadi and directed by Navid Behtooei in 2020. She played the first female role in “In the Arms of the Tree” film. The latter film is preparing for submission to 41st Fajr International Film Festival

She won the Best Actress award at the Within the Family International Festival- in Moscow (July 2025) for her role in the film In the Embrace of the Tree. This festival is dedicated to works focusing on family and children.

== Filmography ==
=== Film ===
Year	Title	Role	Director	Notes	Ref(s)
2016	The Salesman	Kati	Asghar Farhadi		
2016	Drought and Lies	Giti	Pedram Alizadeh		
2019	Small Panda, Big Panda		Sahar Khoshnam	Short film	
2021	Gisoum	Delbar	Navid Behtooee		
2023	In the Arms of the Tree	Kimia	Babak KhajehPasha		
2024	Parvin	Parvin E'tesami	Mohammad Reza Varzi	Won – Crystal Simorgh Fajr Film Festival Award for Best Actress	
2025	Sayed	Efat Shoja'	Javad Afshar		

=== Web ===
Year	Title	Role	Director	Platform	Notes	Ref(s)
2020	The Accomplice	Sara	Mostafa Kiaei	Filimo, Namava	Main role	
2023	The Translator	Parisa	Bahram Tavakoli	Namava	Supporting role	

== Theatre ==
She has played in roles in “Shaparak Khanom” and “The Local Songs”, directed by Mohammad Rahmanian, a fame play writer and theatre director. She has also played in “Arash Sad” play written by Bahram Beizaei which took stage in McMaster Hall, in West Vancouver, Canada and 32nd Fajr International Theatre Festival. In “Bernard Died” play, written by Mashhud Hosseinian and directed by Ali Sarabi, staged in Iranshahr Theatre, Maral Baniadam played with Behnaz Jafari, Ali Sarabi and Atefeh Razavi which warmly welcomed by the audiences. In “The Lord of Massacre” directed by Ali Sarabi, staged in Sharzad Theatre Complex in 2016, she played with Setareh Pesiani and Navid Mohammadzadeh which highly influenced the audiences. Ali Sarabi said: “The Lord of Massacre has had more than fourteen thousand audiences”.

Baniadam performs in “God of Carnage”. The unique moment of the play, hence its peak, is the vomiting scene of “Ant” in which Maral Baniadam vomits several times in the stage.

The Other Side of the Mirror” staged in Vahdat Theatre Hall, Tehran on 6 April 2002 and Maral Baniadam played with fame figures like Rima Raminfar, Elnaz Habibi and Pejman Jamshidi. Maral Baniadam and Elnaz Habibi alternatively play the unique role. The ticket-selling site of “The Other Side of the Mirror” was filtered following an order issued by Center for Theatre Arts the governmental authority supervising over the theatre. Dragan Skočić, the Coach of Iran national football team, was among the audiences in 5th night of the play. “The Other Side of the Mirror” is a play written by French play writer Florian Zeller.

Year	Title	Director	Role
2012	Shaparak Khanom	Mohammad Rahmanian	
2013	Arash Sad	Mohammad Rahmanian	
2014	The Local Songs	Mohammad Rahmanian	
2015	Bernard Died	Ali Sarabi	
2016 – 2018	God of Carnage	Ali Sarabi	Ant
2017	The Other Side of Mirror	Ali Sarabi	

== Awards and nominations ==
Award	Year	Category	Nominated Work	Result	Ref.
Fajr Film Festival	2023	Best Actress in a Leading Role	In the Arms of the Tree	Nominated	
Fajr Film Festival	2024	Best Actress in a Leading Role	Parvin	Won	
Hafez Awards	2024	Best Actress – Motion Picture	In the Arms of the Tree	Nominated	
Within the Family International Festival	2025	Best Actress in a Leading Role	In the Arms of the Tree	Won	
