= Land of Angels (2026 film) =

- Persian: سرزمین فرشته ها
- Directed by: Babak Khajehpasha
- Written by: Babak Khajehpasha
- Produced by: Manouchehr Mohammadi
- Starring: Sulaf Fawakherji; Fatima Al-Masouma Zariq; Ahura Lotfi; Muhammad Asad
- Music by: Massoud Sakhawat Dost
- Release date: 3 February 2026 (FIFF)
- Running time: 121 minutes
- Country: Iran
- Language: Arabic

Land of Angels (Persian: سرزمین فرشته ها, romanized: Sarzamin farshteh cpeha, Arabic: أرض الملائكة, romanized: Arḍ al-Malāʼikah) is a 2026 Iranian drama film written and directed by Babak Khajehpasha, and starring Syrian actress Sulaf Fawakherji. It focuses on the lives and dreams of children in Gaza amidst the ongoing Gaza war.

The film premiered at the 44th Fajr International Film Festival on 3 February 2026, where it won the Crystal Simorgh for Best Film. It was also selected as the Iranian submission for the Academy Award for Best International Feature Film at the 98th Academy Awards.

== Cast ==
- Sulaf Fawakherji
- Fatima Al-Masouma Zariq
- Ahura Lotfi
- Muhammad Asad

== Production ==
Produced by Manouchehr Mohammadi, the film was produced by the Tasvir-e Shahr Institute and the Soureh Cinema Center. Featuring Arab actors, it was filmed in Tehran, Iran.

It marks Khajehpasha second feature film selected to represent Iran for the Academy Award for Best International Feature Film category, following In the Arms of the Tree (2023)

== Release ==
The film premiered at the 44th Fajr International Film Festival, where it won the Crystal Simorgh for Best Film, Crystal Simorgh for Best Director, and three other technical prizes. It also won the Grand Prix for Best Feature Film at the 22nd Altyn Minbar Kazan International Film Festival, in Russia.

== See also ==
- List of submissions to the 99th Academy Awards for Best International Feature Film
- List of Iranian submissions for the Academy Award for Best International Feature Film
