= In the Arms of the Tree =

- Theatrical release poster
- در آغوش درخت
- Directed by: Babak Khajehpasha
- Written by: Babak Khajehpasha
- Produced by: Mohammad Reza Mesbah; Sajjad Nasrollahi Nasab
- Starring: Javad Ghamati; Maral Bani Adam; Ruhollah Zamani; Ahoora Lotfi; Rayan Lotfi
- Release date: 2023
- Country: Iran
- Language: Persian

In the Arms of the Tree (Persian: در آغوش درخت) is a 2023 Iranian drama film written and directed by Babak Khajehpasha, and produced by Mohammad Reza Mesbah and Sajjad Nasrollahi Nasab. It premiered in February 2023 at the 41st Fajr International Film Festival. It was selected as the Iranian submission for the Best International Feature Film at the 97th Academy Awards, but was not nominated.

== Plot ==
The complex crisis in the lives of Kimia and Farid, who have been married for twelve years, disrupts the beautiful world of their children - children who know nothing but simplicity and kindness in life.

== Cast ==
- Maral Baniadam
- Javad Ghamati
- Rouhollah Zamani
- Ahoora Lotfi
- Rayan Lotfi

== Accolades ==
Award	Date	Category	Nominee	Ref.	Ref
41st Fajr International Film Festival	February 11, 2023	Best Film	Mohammad Reza Mesbah	Nominated	
41st Fajr International Film Festival	February 11, 2023	Best First Film	Babak Khajehpasha	Won	
41st Fajr International Film Festival	February 11, 2023	Best Director	Babak Khajehpasha	Won	
41st Fajr International Film Festival	February 11, 2023	Best Actor in a Supporting Role	Ruhollah Zamani	Nominated	
41st Fajr International Film Festival	February 11, 2023	Best Actress in a Leading Role	Maral Bani Adam	Nominated	
41st Fajr International Film Festival	February 11, 2023	Best Screenplay	Babak Khajehpasha	Won	
41st Fajr International Film Festival	February 11, 2023	Best Production Design		Nominated	
41st Fajr International Film Festival	February 11, 2023	Best Sound/Best Sound Recording	Mehdi Javaherzadeh (Sound Design);Masih Hadpour Seraj (Sound Recording)	Nominated	

== See also ==
- List of submissions to the 97th Academy Awards for Best International Feature Film
- List of Iranian submissions for the Academy Award for Best International Feature Film
- Land of Angels
