= Sahra Asadollahi =

Iranian actress

- صحرا اسداللهی
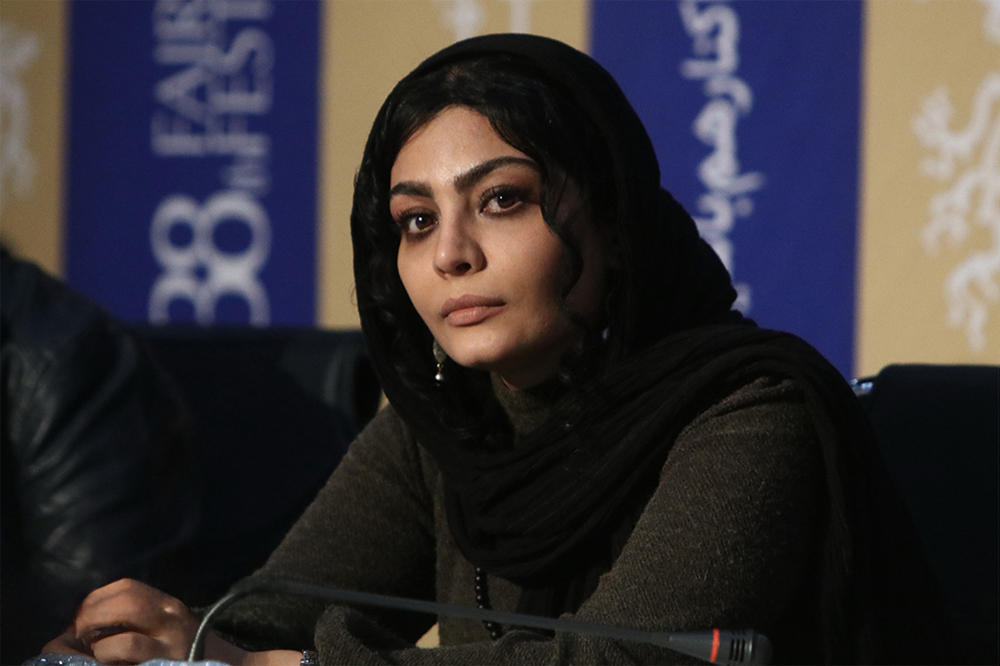
- Asadollahi at the 38th Fajr Film Festival in February 2020
- Born: August 18, 1992 (age 33); Karaj, Iran
- Education: Bachelor's degree in film directing from Soore University
- Occupation: Actress
- Years active: 2013–present

Sahra Asadollahi (Persian: صحرا اسدالهی; born August 18, 1992) is an Iranian actress, short film director, and documentary filmmaker. She began her professional career with a role in the feature film The Salesman (2016), directed by Asghar Farhadi.

In 2024, Asadollahi won the "Best Actress" award at the 7th Beirut International Women’s Film Festival for her performance in the short film Spasm. In the same year, she received the Golden Horse Award for "Most Impactful Actress" at the Sorocaba Film Festival in Brazil for her role in the feature film Parisan.

== Early life and career ==
Sahra Asadollahi was born on August 18, 1992, in the village of Kandar, Karaj, Alborz Province. She holds a degree in architecture and a bachelor’s degree in film directing from Soore University in Tehran. She began her acting career in theater under the guidance of Hamid Samandarian. Asadollahi made her television debut with the series Gahi Be Posht-e Sar Negah Kon (2014), directed by Maziar Miri. Her first on-screen appearance was as a reporter on the program Good Morning Iran.

Asadollahi launched her professional acting career with a role in Asghar Farhadi’s The Salesman (2016). Other notable acting credits include the web series Shabhaye Mafia and Pedarkhandeh, as well as the feature films Pesarkoshi, Parisa, Aradatmane; Nazanin Bahareh Tina, Tabaghe Yek o Nim, Bi-Aban, and Biro. In Biro, she portrayed the mother of Alireza Biranvand, and the film was screened at the 40th Fajr Film Festival.

== Filmography ==
=== Cinema ===
Year	Title	Director	Producer
2015	The Salesman	Asghar Farhadi	Alexandre Mallet-Guy, Asghar Farhadi
2015	Aradatmane; Nazanin Bahareh Tina	Abdolreza Kahani	Abdolreza Kahani, Saeed Khani
2017	Appendix	Hossein Namazi	Maghsoud Jabbari
2017	Mah-e Darya	Maryam Doosti	Saeed Saadi
2019	Molaqat Ba Jadugar	Hamid Bahramian	Hamid Etebarian
2020	Pesarkoshi	Mohammad Hadi Karimi	Sadegh Yari
2020	Aghaye Sansour	Ali Jabarzadeh	Gholamreza Gomrokki
2020	Joojeh Tighi	Mastaneh Mohajer	
2020	Parisa	Mohammadreza Rahmani	Saeed Saadi
2020	Yeghe Sefidha	Shahramm Meslekhi	
2021	Homa va Khaharan	Homa Bazrafshan	Nima Hassani-Nasab
2021	Parisan	Kambiz Babaei	
2021	Biro	Morteza-Ali Abbas Mirzaei	Majid Barzegar
2022	Tabaghe Yek o Nim	Navid Esmaeili	Gholamreza Azadi
2022	Bi-Aban	Mehrdad Kouroshnia	Ali Mohammad Ghasemi
2022	Shomareh 10	Hamid Zargarnezhad	Ebrahim Asghari
2025	Anja Kasi Divaneh Nist	Nima Hashemi	

=== Television ===
Year	Title	Director	Producer
2015	Gahi Be Posht-e Sar Negah Kon	Maziar Miri	Reza Ansarian
2017	Dar Jostejouye Aramesh	Saeed Soltani	Ali Ashtianipour
2017	Bia Az Gozashteh Harf Bezanim	Hamid Nematollah	Mohammadreza Shafiei, Hamid Nematollah
2018	Bache Mohandes 2	Ali Ghaffari	Saeed Saadi
2019	Az Yadha Rafteh	Bahram Bahramian	Akbar Tahvilian
2019	Sharayet-e Khas	Vahid Amirkhani	Seyed Morteza Fatemi
2019	Deldar	Jamshid Mahmoudi, Navid Mahmoudi	
2020	Bache Mohandes 3	Ali Ghaffari	Saeed Saadi
2021	Zendegi Zibast	Qasem Jafari	Ali Hajazimehr
2022	Dastan-e Yek Shahr	Mohammadreza Ahang	Farshid Mahmoudi
2024	Salmane Farsi	Davood Mirbagheri	Hossein Taheri

=== Web ===
Year	Title	Director	Producer
2020	Shabhaye Mafia	Saeed Aboutaleb	Saeed Aboutaleb
2022	Jadugar	Masoud Atyabi	Iraj Mohammadi
2022	Anten	Seyed Ebrahim Amerian	
2022	Pedarkhandeh	Saeed Aboutaleb	
2022	Maarekeh	Behnam Tashakkor	Yousef Bachari
2023	TNT	Hamed Ahangi	Mohammadreza Rezaeian
2023	Chidmaneh	Iraj Tayefeh	Seyed Javad Hashemi
2024	Sham-e Irani 4	Saeed Aboutaleb	

=== Directing ===
- Short film Tari (2024)
- Feature documentary Camera Test (2016)
- Feature documentary Abbas Dariush (2017)
- Documentary Empty (2019)
- Short film If Only (2019)
- Short film Massage Room (2021)
- Documentary Saru (2021)
- Short film Masseur (2021)
- Short film Spasm (2022)
- Documentary Goluni (2022)
- Documentary Groups Create Stories (2022)

== Awards and nominations ==
- Winner of the "Best Actress" award at the 7th Beirut International Women’s Film Festival for the short film Spasm (2024)
- Winner of the Golden Horse Award for "Most Impactful Actress" at the Sorocaba Film Festival in Brazil for the feature film Parisan (2024)
- Nominated for Best Actress at the 15th World Music and Independent Film Festival in the USA for the short film Spasm (2024)
- Nominated for Best Director at the Black Moons Festival in London for the feature documentary Camera Test (2017)
- Winner of the Best Actress award at the Los Angeles Asian Film Festival for the feature film Homa and Sisters (2020)
- Winner of the Festival Trophy and Audience Award for Best Film for the feature documentary Camera Test at the 11th Tehran Shadow Film Festival (2017)
- Nominated for Best Feature Documentary at the Wind International Film Festival in the USA for the feature documentary Camera Test (2016)
- Nominated for Best Feature Documentary at the Black Star International Film Festival in Ghana for the feature documentary Camera Test (2016)
- Nominated for Best Feature Documentary at the Peloponnisos International Film Festival in Greece for the feature documentary Camera Test (2017)
- Nominated for Best Feature Documentary at the San Mauro Torinese International Film Festival in Italy for the feature documentary Camera Test (2017)
- Nominated for Best Feature Documentary at the Noida International Film Festival in India for the feature documentary Camera Test (2017)
