= Atom Heart Mother (film) =

- Directed by: Ali Ahmadzadeh
- Written by: Ali Ahmadzadeh, Mani Baghbani
- Produced by: Amir Seyedzadeh
- Starring: Taraneh Alidoosti; Pegah Ahangarani; Mehrdad Sedighiyan; Mohammad Reza Golzar
- Cinematography: Ashkan Ashkani
- Edited by: Ali Ahmadzadeh, Ehsan Vaseghi
- Music by: Sahand Mehdizadeh
- Release date: February 9, 2015 (Berlinale)
- Running time: 97 minutes
- Country: Iran
- Language: Persian

Atom Heart Mother (Persian: مادر قلب‌اتمی, translit. Madar-e ghalb atomi) is a 2013 produced Iranian film that has been released at the Berlin Film Festival 2015. It was a nominee at the 17th Buenos Aires International Festival of Independent Cinema, the LA Film Festival and the 2015 Odesa International Film Festival, and screened at the 65th Berlin International Film Festival, the 16th San Diego Asian Film Festival and the Zurich Film Festival, but was only permitted for screening in Iran in 2017, after some modifications required by the Ministry of Culture and Islamic Guidance.

== Title ==
The title of the film is a reference to a song by Pink Floyd.

== Plot ==
The plot is set at the beginning days of Mahmoud Ahmadinejad's "Subsidy Reform Plan", and spans one single night. Two friends, Arineh and Nobahar, cruise the streets of Tehran after leaving a party at Midnight. After meeting their friend, Kami, who is planning to immigrate from Iran, they cause a road accident. A mysterious stranger, Toofan, tells them he has settled the accident issue by paying off the other driver. Here the plot shifts from realistic to spooky and metaphysical, when Toofan keeps on re-appearing, talking about dead dictators, weapons of mass destruction and parallel worlds.

The director said about the movie, after its screening at the Berlin Festival:

The first part is reality and the second is dream. When the actor Mohammed Reza Golzar appears, the film changes from the real to the surreal. The concept of this division into real and surreal is that in the first part, the main topic is peace. For me it is important to show a part of Iran and a part of the youth, that is different from the reception from the outside of the country. It was my intention to show also this part of society. It was to introduce the iranian society as it is today, and to end up the first part with the peace song of Michael Jackson... Then the topics change, to war themes and those of a dictatorship.

== Cast ==
- Pegah Ahangarani as Nobahar
- Taraneh Alidoosti as Arineh
- Mohammad Reza Golzar as Toofan and the narrator
- Mehrdad Sedighiyan as Kami
- Ehsan Amani
