= Sulaf Fawakherji =

Syrian actress

- سلاف فواخرجي
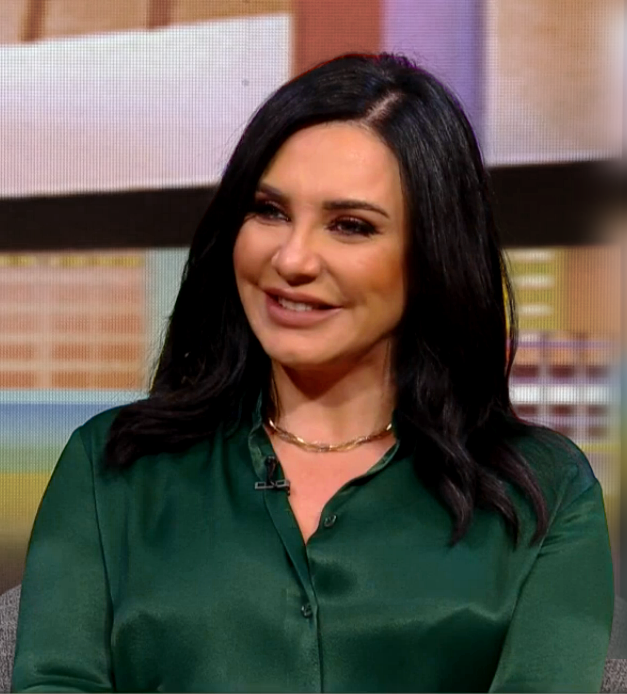
- Born: 27 July 1977 (age 48); Latakia, Syria
- Occupation: Actress
- Years active: 1998–present
- Spouse: Wael Ramadan (m. 1999; div. 2022)
- Children: 2

Sulaf Fawakherji (Arabic: سلاف فواخرجي; born 27 July 1977) is a Syrian film, TV actress and director.

== Career ==
She has played many roles on Syrian soap operas. Fawakherji studied art and sculpture at Adham Ismail Fine Arts Institute before starring on stage in plays including Al-Sawt (The Voice) and Hekayat al-Shetaa (Winter's Tales). She was one of the torchbearer during the leg of the 2008 Summer Olympics torch relay.

She appeared on Syrian television in May 2011 in defense of Bashar al-Assad and the Syrian government during the civil war. She left her country and settled in Egypt following the fall of the Assad regime.

== Personal life ==
Fawakherji was born on 27 July 1977 in Latakia to Mohammed Fawakherji, a film critic, and Ebtsam Adib, an author. She graduated from the Department of Archaeology of the Faculty of Arts at the University of Damascus in 1998.

She was married to the actor Wael Ramadan from 1999 until April 2022, with whom she had two sons.

== Political stance and views on the Syrian Revolution ==
Since the beginning of the Syrian uprising in 2011, Sulaf Fawakherji adopted a pro-government stance, consistently rejecting the term "revolution" and referring to the events as "acts of sabotage." She echoed narratives promoted by Syrian state media and aligned herself with the regime's discourse. In a televised interview with Wafaa El Kilani on Qasr al-Kalam, Fawakherji stated that Bashar al-Assad was not a dictator but a "cultured and understanding man." She also expressed her full support for the Syrian army, describing its members as "the most honorable people."

She continued to maintain this position even after the fall of Assad's regime in late 2024. In several controversial interviews, she dismissed documented massacres such as the 2013 Ghouta chemical attack, calling them "media exaggerations," and questioned human rights reports on abuses in Sednaya Prison, claiming that some scenes were "fabricated." These statements sparked widespread criticism, with activists accusing her of being complicit in political and media propaganda.

=== Visits to regime military sites and destroyed areas ===
Fawakherji made multiple publicized visits to military outposts and conflict zones. She was photographed kissing the regime's flag and embracing soldiers on the frontlines. She also visited areas like Darayya and Zabadani after their populations had been forcibly displaced, describing the scenes as "the return of safety." Her appearances were timed with a surge in official media campaigns aimed at sanitizing the regime's image while denying the scale of destruction inflicted during the military offensives and sieges.

=== Condemnation of the Syrian opposition ===
Fawakherji did not shy away from publicly attacking the opposition, both political and armed. In 2017, she stated: "Anyone who stands against the army is a traitor, and those who work with foreign powers against their homeland have lost their identity." She added that "everyone who took a stance against the state is part of the conspiracy." According to independent Syrian documentation centers, her statements placed her among the artists involved in "media and political incitement against the popular movement."

=== Post-Assad ===
==== Continued defense of Assad after his fall ====
Even after the downfall of Assad's government, Fawakherji continued to praise him, referring to him as a "noble man" and "a symbol of Syria's unity." In multiple interviews, she denied well-documented atrocities, claiming that "the images broadcast by human rights organizations were fabricated" and accusing the media of distorting the truth to serve foreign agendas. Her stance sparked further backlash, particularly in light of newly uncovered evidence of mass graves in Palmyra and Sednaya. Various Syrian cultural and civil groups called on her to apologize for her vocal support of the regime, especially regarding crimes against detainees. Her response was: "I was never part of a killing machine. I supported the state, not the crimes."

==== Public backlash ====
Following the collapse of Assad's regime, Fawakherji faced widespread criticism on social media. Many described her as a "symbol of regime-aligned art" and accused her of "whitewashing atrocities." Activists launched a campaign titled "No Return for Those Who Justified the Killings," demanding that she be barred from appearing in the media in what they called the "new Syria." On April 16, 2025, the Syrian Artists Syndicate issued a decision to expel Fawakherji from the syndicate, explaining in a statement that this was done because of her "insistence on denying the Assad regime's crimes and her disregard for the suffering of the Syrian people."

==== Iranian film controversy ====
In February 2026, Fawakhrji sparked renewed controversy after announcing her participation in an Iranian film, Land of the Angels, a move that provoked widespread anger among many Syrians because of Iran's political and military role in the Syrian conflict, leading to sharp criticism on social media and in Syrian media outlets. Sulaf Fawakherji received the jury's special prize for her role in Land of Angels at 44th Fajr International Film Festival. The movie focused on the lives and dreams of children in Gaza amidst the backdrop of war.

== Selected filmography ==
- Al-Tirhal (1997)
- Nassim al-Roh (1998)
- Halim (2006)
- Bukra Ahla (2005)
- Hassiba (2008)
- The BabyDoll Night (2008)
- Another Rainy Day (2008)
- Asmahan (2008)
- Cleopatra (2010)
- Chicago Street (2020)
- Al Kandoush (2021)
- Mal Al Kabel (2024)
- Land of the Angels (2026)
