= I'm Taraneh, 15 =

- Directed by: Rasul Sadrameli
- Written by: Rasul Sadrameli; Kambuzia Partovi
- Produced by: Mohammad Reza Takhtkeshian
- Starring: Taraneh Alidoosti; Hossein Mahjoub; Mahtab Nasirpour; Milad Sadrameli
- Cinematography: Bahram Badakshani
- Edited by: Mohammad Reza Mouyini
- Music by: Madjid Entezami
- Release date: February 1, 2002 (FIFF)
- Running time: 100 minutes
- Country: Iran
- Language: persian

I'm Taraneh, 15 (Persian: من ترانه، ۱۵ سال دارم) is a 2002 Iranian film directed by Rasul Sadr Ameli. The film was selected as the Iranian entry for the Best Foreign Language Film at the 75th Academy Awards, but it did not make the final shortlist.

== Plot ==
Fifteen-year-old Taraneh, whose widowed father is in jail, refuses the unwanted attentions of carpet salesman Amir - until Amir's mother, at the insistence of his son, talks Taraneh into accepting Amir's marriage proposal. However, instead of a typical marriage, the union is in form of a temporary religious ceremony or "sigheh." Within four months the couple realize that they are incompatible, they divorce and Amir returns to Germany. When Taraneh discovers that she is pregnant she decides against all advice and intense social pressure, to keep the baby.

== Cast ==
- Taraneh Alidoosti as Taraneh
- Hossein Mahjoub as Father
- Mahtab Nasirpour as Mrs. Kishmili
- Milad Sadrameli as Amir

== Awards and nominations ==
Year	Group	Award	Recipients and nominees	Result	Ref.
2002	Fajr Film Festival	Crystal Simorgh Award – Best Directing	Rasul Sadrameli	Won	
2002	Fajr Film Festival	Crystal Simorgh Award – Best Makeup	Ali Abedini	Won	
2002	Fajr Film Festival	Crystal Simorgh Award – Best Screenplay	Kambuzia Partovi, Rasul Sadrameli	Won	
2002	Fajr Film Festival	Crystal Simorgh Award – Best Actress	Taraneh Alidoosti	Won	
2002	Fajr Film Festival	Diploma of Honor – Best Actress in Supporting Role	Mahtab Nasirpour	Won	
2002	Locarno International Film Festival	Bronze Leopard – Best Actress	Taraneh Alidoosti	Won	
2002	Locarno International Film Festival	Special Prize of the Jury	Rasul Sadrameli	Won	
2002	Locarno International Film Festival	Youth Jury Award: Environment is Quality of Life	Rasul Sadrameli	Won	
2002	Locarno International Film Festival	Golden Leopard	Rasul Sadrameli	Nominated	
2002	Thessaloniki International Film Festival	FIPRESCI Prize	Rasul Sadrameli	Won	
2003	Brisbane International Film Festival	Interfaith Award	Rasul Sadrameli	Won	

== See also ==
- List of submissions to the 75th Academy Awards for Best Foreign Language Film
