= List of Iranian submissions for the Academy Award for Best International Feature Film =

Best International Feature Film submissions from Iran

Highlights
- Debut: 1977
- Submissions: 33
- Nominations: 3
- Oscar winners: 2

Iran has submitted films for the Academy Award for Best International Feature Film (Note: The category was previously named the Academy Award for Best Foreign Language Film, but this was changed to the Academy Award for Best International Feature Film in April 2019, after the Academy deemed the word "Foreign" to be outdated.) regularly since 1994. Prior to the Iranian Revolution of 1979, the Imperial State of Iran sent a single film in 1977.

As of 2026, Iran has been nominated three times, winning twice for A Separation (2011) and The Salesman (2016), both directed by Asghar Farhadi. It's the only country in West Asia to have won the award.

== History ==
=== Controversies ===
On 24 September 2012, the film A Cube of Sugar was selected as the Iranian entry for the Best Foreign Language Oscar at the 85th Academy Awards. However, on the same day the head of Iran's government controlled cinema agency called for a boycott of the Oscars due to the Innocence of Muslims video on YouTube that originated in the United States. Reuters reported that Iran's Culture and Islamic Guidance Minister Mohammad Hosseini had confirmed that Iran would boycott.

=== Persecution of filmmakers ===
Since its Revolution, Iran has only submitted films considered adequate with the regime's Islamic law, banning several productions, arresting filmmakers and actors, and thus making impossible for them to participate in the category selection process. Despite being persecuted, many filmmakers have been shooting illegally in Iran in partnership with international production companies and international crew members (producers, editors, cinematographers), allowing other countries to selected their films as its official entry.

In 2024, Germany submitted for the first time a film not in the German language, the Iranian co-produced The Seed of the Sacred Fig by Mohammad Rasoulof, which follows the anti-regime 2022–2023 protests in Iran. Rasoulof was incarcerated several times for filming numerous political films without a permit, until 2024 when he successfully escaped to Germany alongside other cast and crew members. The film was ultimately nominated in the category.

In 2025, France (known for the protection of its local cinema industry) submitted It Was Just an Accident by Jafar Panahi, an Iranian co-production shot in Persian. The film follows the political repression in Iran and the social paranoia created by it. Panahi, also persecuted and incarcerated several times, made the film without an official filming permission. Although the filmmaker was allowed for the first time in more than twenty years to leave Iran, attending the film world premiere at 2025 Cannes Film Festival where it won the Palme d'Or, the production didn't receive a governmental approval to be screened in Iranian cinemas. The film was ultimately nominated in the category and was also nominated for Best Original Screenplay.

In at least twelve occasions films made by Iranian directors represented other countries: I Love Vienna (Austria), Persepolis (France), For a Moment, Freedom (Austria), Baba Joon (Israel), Utopia (Afghanistan), Under the Shadow (United Kingdom), Parting (Afghanistan), Yeva (Armenia), Border (Sweden), Holy Spider (Denmark), Winners and Rehearsals for a Revolution (both for the United Kingdom); but were not nominated.

== Submissions ==
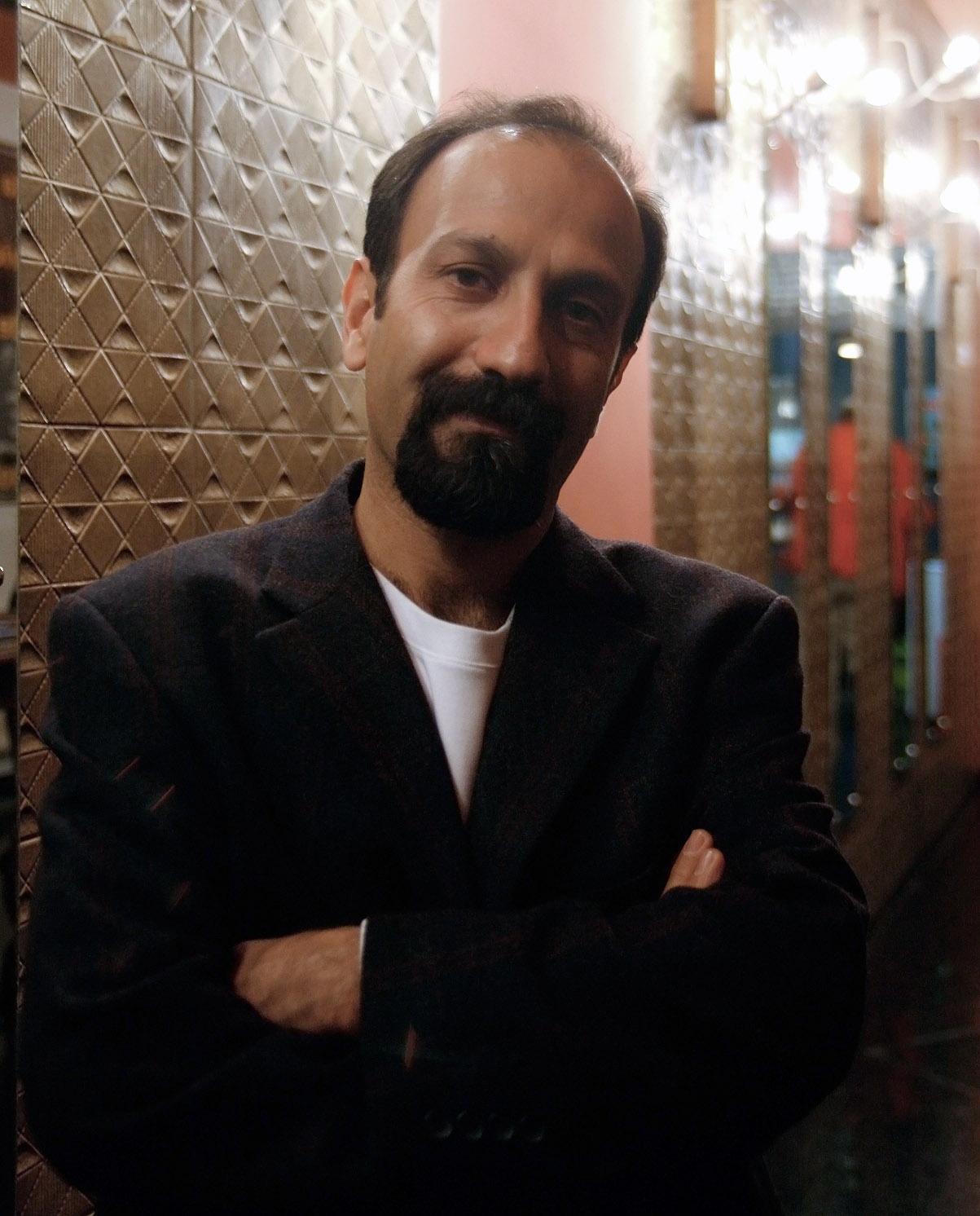
Asghar Farhadi won the award twice for director of A Separation (2011) and The Salesman (2013).

The Academy of Motion Picture Arts and Sciences has invited the film industries of various countries to submit their best film for the Academy Award for Best International Feature Film since 1956. The International Feature Film Committee oversees the process and reviews all the submitted films. Following this, they vote via secret ballot to determine the five nominees for the award.

The Iranian nominee is selected each fall by a committee appointed by the Farabi Cinematic Foundation. Despite poor relations with the United States, Iran has participated in the US-based competition since 1994, missing only one year. They attempted to withdraw their 1995 submission The White Balloon after sending it to Hollywood, but AMPAS refused to accept the withdrawal.

The most submitted filmmaker is Majid Majidi, with six entries and one nomination for Children of Heaven (1998), followed by Asghar Farhadi, with five entries and two wins for A Separation (2011) and The Salesman (2016).

Sun Children (2020) and A Hero (2021) advanced to the December shortlists, but were not nominated.

Most of the films selected were primarily in Persian, with the exception of Ghobadi's two Kurdish language films and Farhadi's The Past which is mostly in French. Below is a list of the films that have been submitted by Iran for review by the Academy for the award by year and the respective Academy Awards ceremony.

Year (Ceremony)	Film title used in nomination	Original Title	Director(s)	Result
1977 (50th)	The Cycle	دايره مينا	Dariush Mehrjui	Not nominated
1994 (67th)	Through the Olive Trees	زیر درختان زیتون	Abbas Kiarostami	Not nominated
1995 (68th)	The White Balloon	بادکنک سفید	Jafar Panahi	Not nominated
1997 (70th)	Gabbeh	گبه	Mohsen Makhmalbaf	Not nominated
1998 (71st)	Children of Heaven	بچه‌های آسمان	Majid Majidi	Nominated
1999 (72nd)	The Color of Paradise	رنگ خدا	Majid Majidi	Not nominated
2000 (73rd)	A Time for Drunken Horses	زمانی برای مستی اسب‌ها	Bahman Ghobadi	Not nominated
2001 (74th)	Baran	باران	Majid Majidi	Not nominated
2002 (75th)	I'm Taraneh, 15	من ترانه، ۱۵ سال دارم	Rasul Sadrameli	Not nominated
2003 (76th)	Deep Breath	نفس عمیق	Parviz Shahbazi	Not nominated
2004 (77th)	Turtles Can Fly	لاک‌پشت‌ها هم پرواز می‌کنند	Bahman Ghobadi	Not nominated
2005 (78th)	So Close, So Far	خیلی دور، خیلی نزدیک	Reza Mirkarimi	Not nominated
2006 (79th)	Café Transit	کافه ترانزیت	Kambuzia Partovi	Not nominated
2007 (80th)	M for Mother	میم مثل مادر	Rasul Mollagholipour	Not nominated
2008 (81st)	The Song of Sparrows	آواز گنجشک‌ها	Majid Majidi	Not nominated
2009 (82nd)	About Elly...	...درباره الی	Asghar Farhadi	Not nominated
2010 (83rd)	Farewell Baghdad	بدرود بغداد	Mehdi Naderi	Not nominated
2011 (84th)	A Separation	جدایی نادر از سیمین	Asghar Farhadi	Won Academy Award
2013 (86th)	The Past	گذشته	Asghar Farhadi	Not nominated
2014 (87th)	Today	امروز	Reza Mirkarimi	Not nominated
2015 (88th)	Muhammad: The Messenger of God	محمد رسول‌الله	Majid Majidi	Not nominated
2016 (89th)	The Salesman	فروشنده	Asghar Farhadi	Won Academy Award
2017 (90th)	Breath	نفس	Narges Abyar	Not nominated
2018 (91st)	No Date, No Signature	بدون تاریخ، بدون امضاء	Vahid Jalilvand	Not nominated
2019 (92nd)	Finding Farideh	در جستجوی فریده	Kourosh Ataee, Azadeh Moussavi	Not nominated
2020 (93rd)	Sun Children	خورشید	Majid Majidi	Made shortlist
2021 (94th)	A Hero	قهرمان	Asghar Farhadi	Made shortlist
2022 (95th)	World War III	جنگ جهانی سوم	Houman Seyyedi	Not nominated
2023 (96th)	The Night Guardian	نگهبان شب	Reza Mirkarimi	Not nominated
2024 (97th)	In the Arms of the Tree	در آغوش درخت	Babak Lotfi Khajepasha	Not nominated
2025 (98th)	Cause of Death: Unknown	علت مرگ: نامعلوم	Ali Zarnegar	Not nominated
2026 (99th)	Land of Angels	سرزمین فرشته ها	Babak Khajehpasha	Pending

== Shortlisted films ==
In 2025, the Iranian selection committee created for the first time a shortlist of eligible films, from which a finalist would be chosen. The movement came after numerous controversies regarding the country unclear submission process, raised online by industry members and local filmmakers.

Even though the new formal process was established, the Iranian submission committee continued to snub political films released without permission in international film festivals during 2025, such as: It Was Just an Accident by Jafar Panahi, Put Your Soul on Your Hand and Walk by Sepideh Farsi, Cutting Through Rocks by Sara Khaki and Mohammadreza Eyni, Between Dreams and Hope by Farnoosh Samadi, Divine Comedy by Ali Asgari, Inside Amir by Amir Azizi and Past Future Continuous by Morteza Ahmadvand and Firouzeh Khosrovani.

Saeed Roustayi, once arrested for premiering Leila's Brothers (2022) at Cannes without permission, had his new film Woman and Child (which also premiered at Cannes) shortlisted, but was ultimately snubbed.

Year	Films
2025	Call Me Ziba · The Old Bachelor · Raha · Woman and Child

== See also ==
- List of Iranian Academy Award winners and nominees
- List of Academy Award winners and nominees for Best International Feature Film
- List of Academy Award-winning foreign language films
- Cinema of Iran
