= Abi-e Roshan =

- Directed by: Babak Khajehpasha
- Produced by: Seyyed Mohammad Hossein Miri
- Production company: Owj Arts and Media Organization And Farabi Cinema Foundation
- Distributed by: Owj Arts and Media Organization
- Release date: 12 June 2024
- Running time: 105 minutes
- Country: Iran
- Language: Persian

Abi-e Roshan (i.e. Light Blue) (Persian language:آبی روشن) is an Iranian film directed by Babak Khajehpasha, written by Amir Abili and Davud Ganjavi, and produced by Seyyed Mohammad Hossein Miri. The film is a joint production of Owj Arts and Media Organization and Farabi Cinema Foundation, and was first screened at the 42nd Fajr Film Festival in 2024. The film was accepted into the competitive section of the 14th Zuma Film Festival in Nigeria.

== Synopsis ==
Abi-e Roshan is a social film set in the city of Tabriz. The film is a dramatic narrative of the problems of a man centered on Mehran Ahmadi as Younes, a mine owner, confidant, and city magnate who embarks on a new path with the discovery of a rare turquoise.

== Cast ==
Among the cast of "Abi-e Roshan" are as follows:

- Mehran Ahmadi
- Mehran Ghafourian
- Sara Hatami
- Morteza Amini-Tabar
- Rouhollah Zamani
- Ali Akbar Asanlou
- Kazem HajirAzad

== Other involved individuals ==
Project manager: Vahid Manani, director of photography: Peyman Abbaszadeh, editor: Hossein Jamshidi-Gohari, sound design and mixing: Arash Ghasemi, music: Farid Saadatmand, set designer: Amir Zaghari, production manager: Seyed Maghsoud Mirhashemi, makeup designer: Kamran Khalaj, sound director: Ashkan Portaji, costume designer: Elham Turkman, planning manager: Omid Hemmatifaraz, casting director: Kiomars Moradi, first assistant director: Amir Ronaghi, field special effects designer: Iman Karmian, visual effects designer: Amin Pahlavanzadeh, set secretary: Arezo Ghorbani, set photographer: Samad Ghorbanzadeh, advertising: Shahrfarang Studio, badge designer: Ehsan Hosseini, public relations: Ali Salmanzadeh.

== Gallery ==
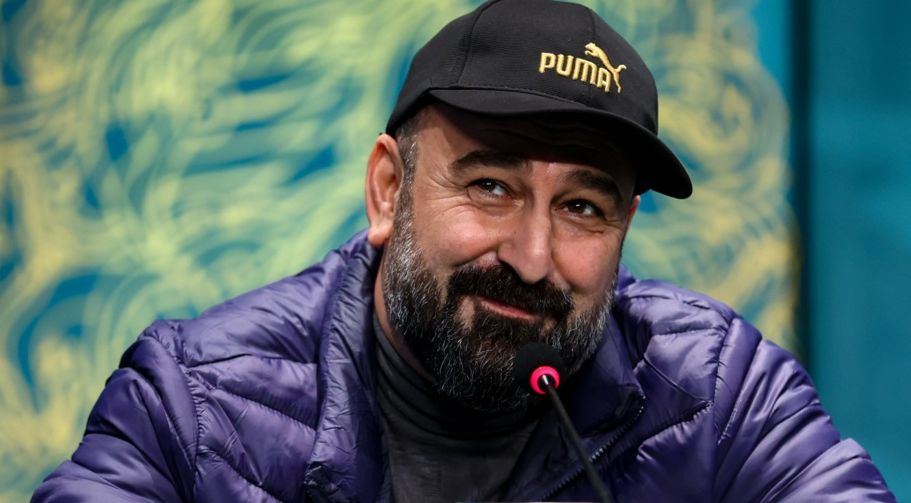
Mehran Ahmadi

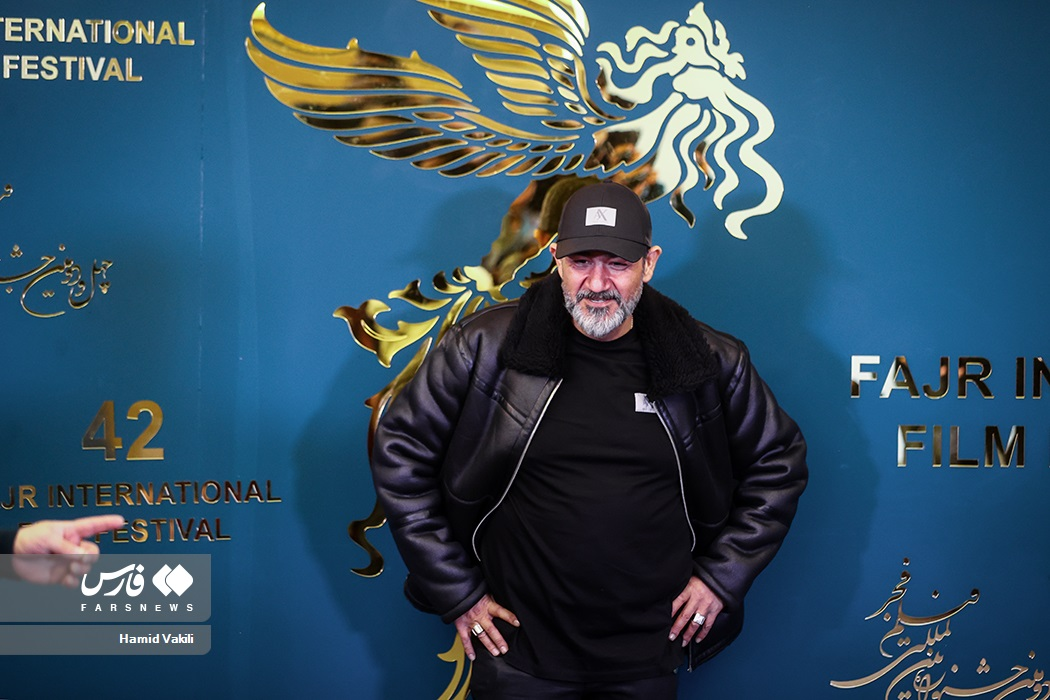
Mehran Ghafourian in the photocall of Abhi Roshan film on the eighth day of the Fajr 42 film festival

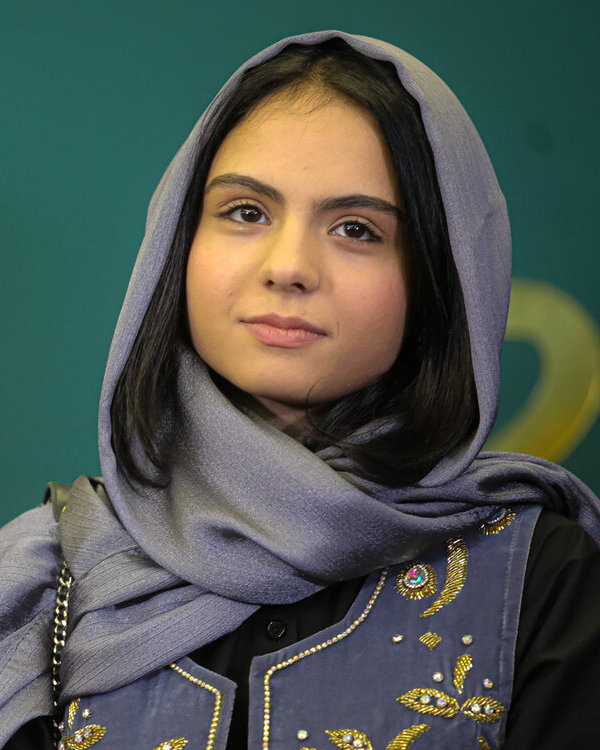
Sara Hatami at 42nd Fajr Film Festival

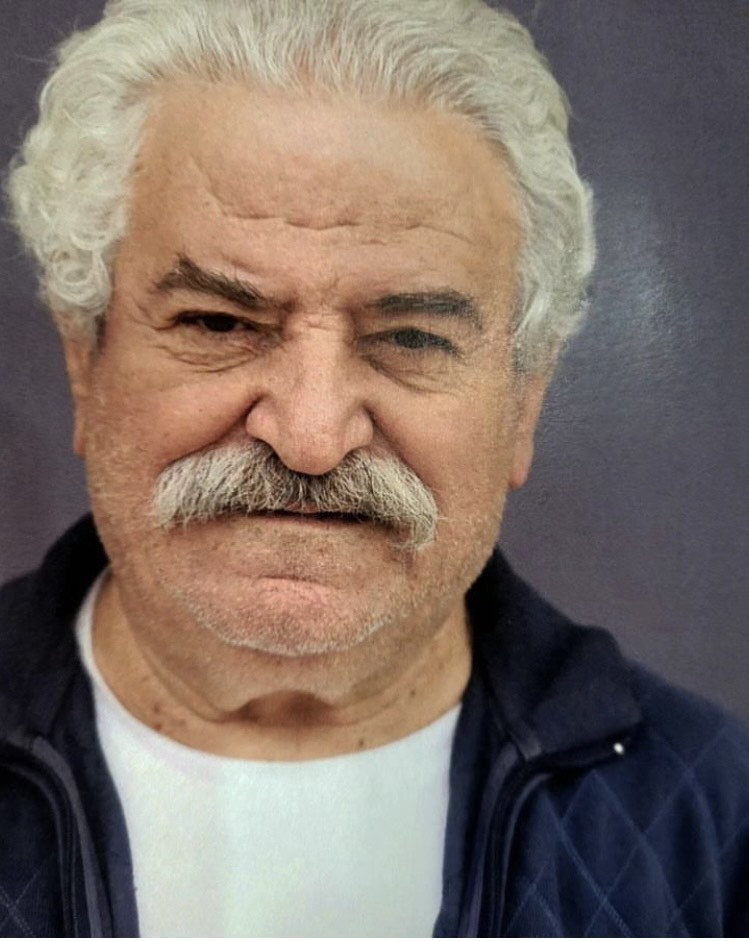
KazemHajirAzad

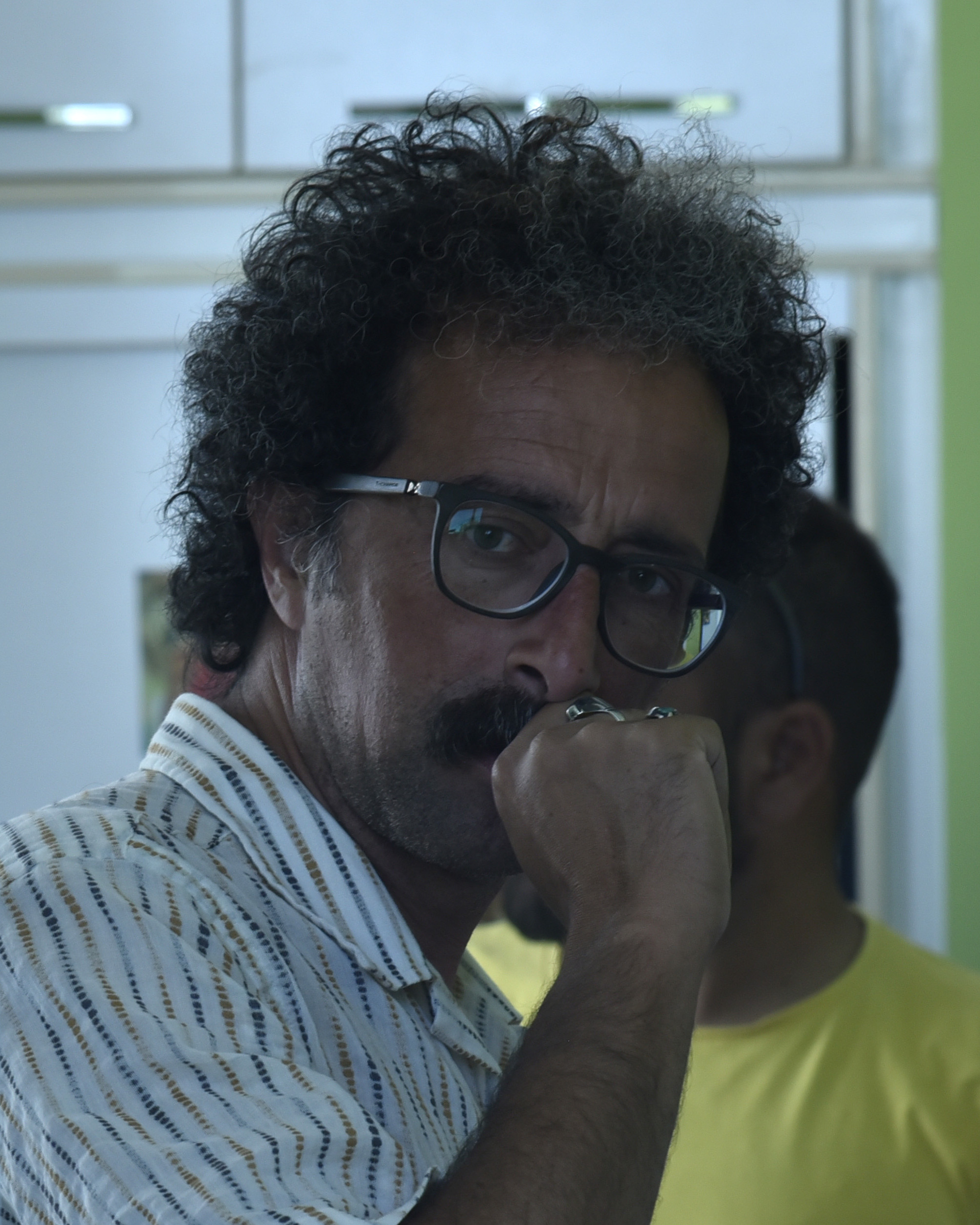
Babak lotfi khaje pasha (directed)
