= Mehdi Naderi =

Iranian film director (born 1973)

مهدی نادری Mehdī Nāderī
- Born: April 17, 1973; Rey, Iran
- Occupations: Director, scriptwriter, editor, producer
- Years active: Since 1988
- Notable work: Farewell Baghdad; Dokhtarān-e Aftāb

Mehdī Nāderī (Persian: مهدی نادری; born 17 April 1973 in Ray, Tehran) is an Iranian film director. He started directing theater in 1988. He has directed documentaries and fiction films. He is also a producer, scriptwriter, advisor and editor.

His debut feature film Farewell Baghdad was Iran's entry to the 83rd Academy Awards for Best Foreign Language Film, but it didn't make the final shortlist.

== Filmography ==
=== As a director and scriptwriter ===
Year	Original (Persian) title	English title	Length	Notes
2010	Bedrūd Bāghdād	Farewell Baghdad	90'	Fiction
2008	Royaha-ye faramūsh shode	Forgotten Dreams. Memories of a Polish immigrant	28'	Documentary
2008	Ghadam be ghadam	Step by Step. Short portrait of Shirin Ebadi	6'	Documentary (trailer)
2007	Next stop	Next stop	10'	Experimental, unreleased
2005	-	Image of the Words. Portrait of Kambuzia Partovi	45'	Documentary
2005	-	Worshippers of the Darkness	52'	Documentary, unreleased
2004	Sūti tāriki	Whistle in the Dark	13'	Docu-fiction
2003	Gozāresh zir-e khāk	Buried Treasures. An Underground Report	40'	Documentary
2002	Dokhtarān-e Aftāb	The Daughters of Sunshine	21'	Documentary
2000	-	Sewed Lips	12'	Fiction
1998	Festival	Festival	20'	Experimental fiction
1996	Mādar	Mother	12'	Fiction
1996	Zang-e panjom	Fifth Ring	5'	Fiction
1995	Hedie-ye Bāba	Fathers gift	18'	Experimental

=== As Writer ===
Year	Original title	English title	Director	Length	Notes	
2009	ABC-Policy	ABC-Policy	Hamid Akbari	65'	Political comedy	script & advisor
2008	Qasr Chaplin	Chaplins Palace	Amir Seyedzadeh	360'	TV-Serial (not screened) comedy drama	script
2008	Bedune sharh	No comment	Mohsen Amiryosefi	80'	fiction	script
2007	Ghalb-e Simorgh	Simorgh's Heart	Wahid Nassirian	90'	animation	dialogues

=== As Editor ===
Year	Original title	English title	Director	Length	Notes
2009	Shekār	Hunt	Beirūz Ghobādi	5'	experimental
2009	To khorshīd man māh	You're the Sun, I'm the Moon	Moharram Zeīnalzādēh	85'	Fiction
2008	Khāb-e tārīk	Dark dream	Rezā Sobhāni	15'	Fiction
2007	Farāri	Run away	Hamīd Ghawāmi	50'	Experimental fiction
2007	Rahman	Rahman: Four Stories	Ālireza Nāderi	92'	Film theater
2006	Asb	Horse	Madi Omid	85'	Fiction
2005	Gorīz	Escape	Hīwā Zabihi	20'	Fiction
2001	Tavāllod-e yek shekārchi	Birth of a Hunter	Hamīd Ghawāmi	5'	Experimental

== Awards ==
Farewell Baghdad

- 2010 Best film - Baghdad Film Festival (Iraq)
- 2010 elected Iran's Official Submission to the 2011 Best Foreign Language Film Oscar of the Academy of Motion Picture Arts and Sciences (AMPAS)

Rahman: Four Stories (by Alīrezā Nāderī)

- 2009 Best film-theater editing - FAJR Theater Festival (Iran)

Forgotten Dreams

- 2008 Best cinema student Film award - Haqiqat Film Festival (Iran)

Farāri (by hamid ghavami )

- 2008 Best Experimental Editing - IYCS-Film Festival (Iran)

Dokhterān-e Āftāb

- 2006 - ... - National Women Film Festival (Iran)
- 2003 Paulig Baltic's Prize - Parnu Film Festival (Estonia)
- 2003 Best Documentary - Tampere Film Festival (Finland)
- 2003 Recognition - International FAJR Film Festival (Iran)

Gozāresh zir-e zamīn

- 2004 Best research - Documentary Film Tehran University (Iran)
- 2004 Special Jury Award - International Short Film Festival (Iran)
- 2003 Best Documentary Directing - Khaneh Cinema Board (Iran)
- 2003 Best fiction documentary film - Heritage Film Festival (Iran)

Festival

- 2000 Urkunde - Festival der Nationen. Ebensee (Austria)

Fifth Ring

- 1997 Best National Shortfilm - International Short Film Festival (Iran)
