= Babak Khajehpasha =

Iranian filmmaker, screenwriter, and actor

Babak Lotfi Khajeh-Pasha
- بابک خواجه‌پاشا
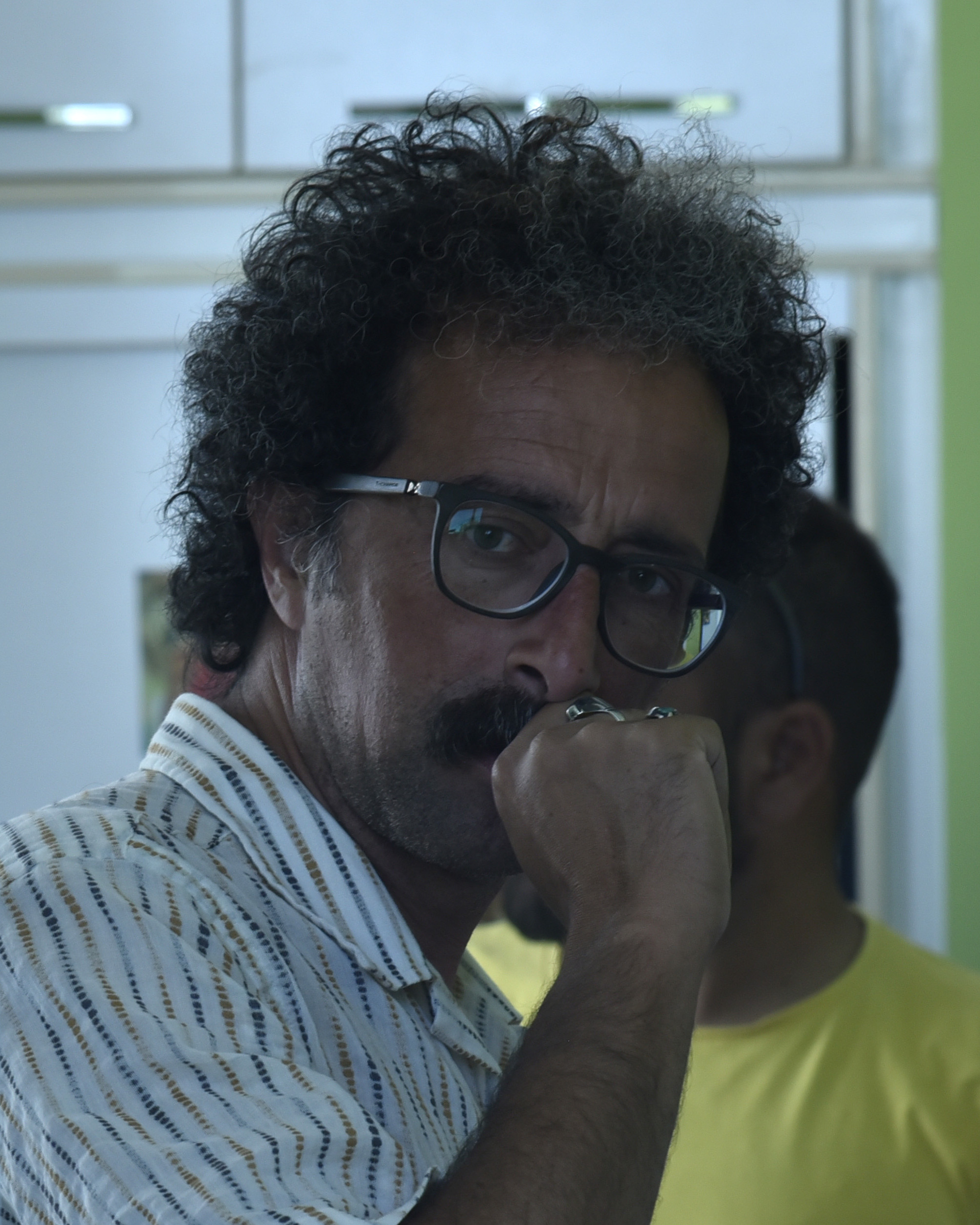
- Born: 20 April 1981 (age 45)
- Occupations: screenwriter; film director

Babak Lotfi Khajeh-Pasha (born April 20, 1981) is an Iranian filmmaker, screenwriter, and actor. He won the Crystal Simorgh for Best Screenplay at the 41st Fajr Film Festival for writing the screenplay for In the Arms of the Tree (2022).

== Filmography ==
- 2022 : In the Arms of the Tree
- 2024 : Abi-e Roshan
- 2026 : Land of Angels
