= The Past (2013 film) =

- Theatrical release poster
- Directed by: Asghar Farhadi
- Written by: Asghar Farhadi
- Produced by: Alexandre Mallet-Guy
- Starring: Bérénice Bejo; Tahar Rahim; Ali Mosaffa
- Cinematography: Mahmoud Kalari
- Edited by: Juliette Welfling
- Music by: Youli Galperine; Evgueni Galperine
- Production companies: Memento Films Production; France 3 Cinéma; BIM Distribuzione; Canal+ Ciné+ France Télévisions
- Distributed by: Memento Films (France); BIM Distribuzione (Italy); Filmiran (Iran)
- Release dates: 17 May 2013 (Cannes); 19 June 2013 (Iran); 21 November 2013 (Italy)
- Running time: 130 minutes
- Countries: France; Italy; Iran
- Languages: French; Persian; Italian
- Budget: $8 million
- Box office: $10.6 million

The Past (French: Le passé, Persian: گذشته Gozashte) is a 2013 drama film, written and directed by Iranian director Asghar Farhadi and starring Bérénice Bejo, Tahar Rahim and Ali Mosaffa. It is a co-production between France, Italy and Iran.

The film was nominated for the Palme d'Or award at the 2013 Cannes Film Festival and won the festival's Prize of the Ecumenical Jury. Bejo also won the festival's Best Actress Award. It was shown at the 2013 Toronto International Film Festival.

The film was selected as the Iranian entry for the Best Foreign Language Film at the 86th Academy Awards, but it was not nominated. The film was nominated for Best Foreign Language Film at the 71st Golden Globe Awards.

== Plot ==
Ahmad, an Iranian man, returns to France after four years to finalise his divorce with his wife Marie. On the way to her home, he learns that she has begun a relationship with Samir, the owner of a dry cleaning service and he is to share a room with Samir's son Fouad. At Marie's request, he speaks to her daughter from a previous marriage, Lucie, regarding her recent troubled behavior. Lucie disapproves of Marie's new relationship.

Ahmad and Marie attend court to complete their divorce. Just before the meeting with the officials, she tells him that she is pregnant with Samir's child. Ahmad continues to counsel Lucie, hoping to reconcile her to the situation. She reveals that Samir is still married and his wife is in a coma after a suicide attempt, caused by the revelation that Samir and Marie were having an affair. Samir tells Ahmad that his wife suffered from depression and the suicide attempt was in fact caused by an incident with a customer in his shop. His wife was unaware of his affair and he arranges for Naïma, his employee, who witnessed both the suicide attempt and the incident in the shop, to meet with Lucie.

After hearing Naïma's story, Lucie becomes distressed and confesses that she forwarded Marie and Samir's email correspondence to Samir's wife the day before she tried to kill herself, after calling her at the dry cleaning shop. Lucie disappears, and Ahmad and Samir search for her. Ahmad finds Lucie, who has been staying with a friend, and tries to convince her to tell Marie what she did, saying that Marie has a right to know, now that she is carrying Samir's child. Lucie does so and Marie becomes enraged, telling Lucie to leave, which she does. Ahmad calms the situation and Marie goes after Lucie, asking her to come back, which she does.

After questioning what feelings he may still hold for his wife, Marie tells Samir what Lucie did. Samir finds this hard to accept and questions Naïma about the events leading up to his wife's suicide attempt. Naïma states his wife wasn't even in the shop the day that Lucie said she called. After Marie accuses Lucie of lying, Lucie maintains her version of events saying that she spoke to a woman with an accent on the phone. Samir realizes that she actually spoke to Naïma, who then gave Lucie his wife's email address. He confronts Naïma, who confesses and explains that his wife had always been jealous of her and had been trying to get her either sacked or deported from France and had initiated the confrontation with the customer. However, Naïma believes that his wife never read the emails, because she came into the shop and chose to drink bleach in front of her, instead of in front of Samir or Marie.

Samir and Marie discuss the events and their relationship. Samir decides that they should focus on their future, while Marie appears conflicted. Ahmad prepares to return to Iran. He says farewell to the children and attempts to talk to Marie about the end of their marriage, but Marie does not let him, stating that she doesn't need to know such things now. Meanwhile, Samir visits his wife in the hospital with a selection of perfumes, which the doctors have recommended in order to possibly initiate a response. He sprays onto his neck some of his cologne and leans over her lying comatose in her hospital bed. With his face close to his wife's he whispers to her to squeeze his hand if she can smell it. A tear rolls down her cheek but she remains comatose, and he looks down at her hand, which may or may not be holding his. It is unclear in the final scene whether she is responsive or not.

== Cast ==
- Bérénice Bejo as Marie Brisson
- Tahar Rahim as Samir
- Ali Mosaffa as Ahmad
- Pauline Burlet as Lucie
- Elyes Aguis as Fouad
- Jeanne Jestin as Léa
- Sabrina Ouazani as Naïma
- Babak Karimi as Shahryar
- Valeria Cavalli as Valeria
- Eleonora Marino as Marie's colleague
- Hossein Rahmani Manesh as Pooya

== Reception ==
The film received critical acclaim. It holds a 93% rating on review aggregator website Rotten Tomatoes, based on 144 reviews with a weighted average score of 8.2/10 and the site's consensus: "Beautifully written, sensitively directed, and powerfully acted, The Past serves as another compelling testament to Asghar Farhadi's gift for finely layered drama." On Metacritic, the film has a normalized score of 85% based on 41 reviews.

The German-English website KinoCritics.com wrote the three main actors Bejo, Rahim and Mosaffa were convincing in their roles and added "a natural liveliness" to their scenes.

=== Accolades ===
Year	Group	Award	Result
2013	Alliance of Women Film Journalists	Best Foreign Language Film	Nominated
2013	Asia Pacific Screen Awards	Best Feature Film	Nominated
2013	Asia Pacific Screen Awards	Best Screenplay	Nominated
2014	Broadcast Film Critics Association	Best Foreign Language Film	Nominated
2013	Cannes Film Festival	Best Actress Award	Won
2013	Cannes Film Festival	Prize of the Ecumenical Jury	Won
2013	Cannes Film Festival	Palme d'Or	Nominated
2014	39th César Awards	Best Film	Nominated
2014	39th César Awards	Best Director	Nominated
2014	39th César Awards	Best Original Screenplay	Nominated
2014	39th César Awards	Best Editing	Nominated
2014	39th César Awards	Best Actress	Nominated
2014	Broadcast Film Critics Association	Best Foreign Language Film	Nominated
2013	Durban International Film Festival	Best Screenplay	Won
2013	Films from the South	Best Feature Film	Nominated
2013	Films from the South	Audience Award	Won
2014	Georgia Film Critics Association	Best Foreign Film	Nominated
2014	Golden Globes	Best Foreign Language Film	Nominated
2013	Louis Delluc Prize	Best Film	Nominated
2014	Lumière Awards	Best Screenplay	Nominated
2014	4th Magritte Awards	Most Promising Actress	Won
2014	Motion Picture Sound Editors Golden Reel Awards	Best Sound Editing in a Foreign Feature Film	Won
2013	National Board of Review	Best Foreign Language Film	Won
2013	New York Film Critics Circle	Best Foreign Language Film	Runner-up
2014	Palm Springs International Film Festival	FIPRESCI Prize for Best Actress	Won
2014	Prix Jacques Prévert du Scénario	Best Original Screenplay	Won
2013	San Francisco Film Critics Circle	Best Foreign Language Film	Nominated
2014	Satellite Awards	Best Foreign Language Film	Nominated
2013	Tallinn Black Nights Film Festival	Audience Award	Nominated
2013	Toronto Film Critics Association	Best Foreign Language Film	Nominated
2013	Utah Film Critics Association	Best Foreign Language Film	Runner-up
2013	Washington D.C. Area Film Critics Association	Best Foreign Language Film	Nominated

== See also ==
- 2013 in film
- List of French films of 2013
- List of Iranian films of the 2010s
- List of Iranian submissions for the Academy Award for Best Foreign Language Film
- List of Italian films of the 2010s
- List of submissions to the 86th Academy Awards for Best Foreign Language Film
