= Taraneh Alidoosti =

Iranian actress (born 1984)

- ترانه عليدوستی
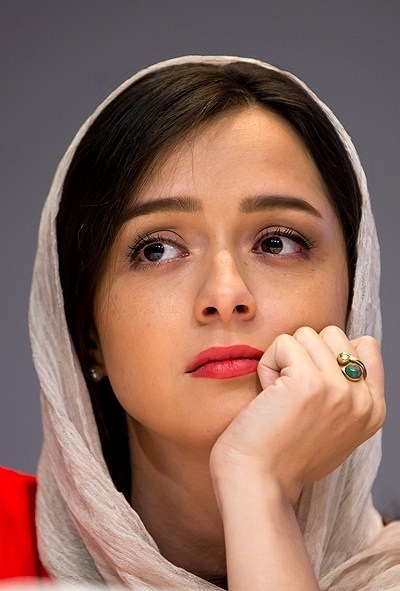
- Alidoosti in 2016
- Born: 12 January 1984 (age 42); Tehran, Iran
- Occupation: Actress
- Years active: 2002–present
- Spouse: Ali Mansour (m. 2011)
- Children: 1
- Father: Hamid Alidoosti

Taraneh Alidoosti (Persian: ترانه عليدوستی, Persian pronunciation: [tæɾɒːˈne æliːduːsˈtiː]; born 12 January 1984) is an Iranian actress. She is best known internationally for her role in The Salesman (2016), which won the Best Foreign Language Film Award at the 89th Academy Awards. In a poll conducted among 130 film critics by Sanate Cinema magazine, she was voted the best Iranian movie actress of the decade. In 2012, a similar poll by the Film magazine also chose her as the best actress of the decade.

== Career ==
After having attended the acting school of Amin Tarokh since 2000, she had a leading role in I'm Taraneh, 15 (Rasul Sadr Ameli, 2002). Critics praised her performance as a 15-year-old girl who after a failed relationship is determined to rear a child on her own while struggling with poverty and disapproval. She won the Bronze Leopard for Best Actress at the Locarno International Film Festival in 2002, as well as the Crystal Simorgh for Best Actress at the 20th Fajr Film Festival, becoming the youngest person ever to do so. Shortly after she set another record, getting nominated three consecutive times for the best actress award at the Fajr Film Festival for her first three films. Since then she has maintained a steady but selective workflow in both theatre and cinema. She was the lead actress for Ashgar Farhadi's Fireworks Wednesday in 2006, which was also screened at the Locarno Film Festival.

Alidoosti is mostly known for her selectiveness in accepting dramatic roles, as exemplified by her long collaboration with Oscar winner Asghar Farhadi, making her one of the most acclaimed actresses of her generation. She acted as the lead actress in The Salesman which won an Oscar in 2017. A prominent actress in Iran, she has bagged many awards and accolades.

Alidoosti played the title role during the three seasons of the hit Iranian VOD series Shahrzad.

Daily Kos has recognized Alidoosti as one of several historically trailblazing women born between 9 through 16 January, along with three other Iranians, Kimia Alizadeh, Christiane Amanpour, and Nadia Maftouni.

== Personal life ==
Alidoosti's father, Hamid, played football for Iran’s national team and was the first Iranian to play for a foreign team (FSV Salmrohr, German 2. Bundesliga). Afterward, he became a professional football coach. Alidoosti's mother, Nadereh Hakim-Elahi, is a sculptor and art tutor. Her only brother, Poyan, died in an accident during the annual Iranian Fire Festival (Chaharshanbe Suri), in March 2005 at the age of 16.

Alidoosti married Ali Mansour in 2011 and has a daughter named Hannah born in 2013.

== Activism and arrest ==
=== Academy Awards boycott ===
On 26 January 2017, Alidoosti announced she would be boycotting the 89th Academy Awards where The Salesman had been nominated for Best Foreign Language Film to protest against upcoming stringent visa travel restrictions that the Trump administration planned to impose on Iranians.

=== Arrest ===
On 17 December 2022, Iranian authorities detained Alidoosti for an Instagram post criticizing the execution of Mohsen Shekari, which was the first known execution carried out by the Islamic Republic of Iran as a direct result of the Mahsa Amini protests. The Instagram post reads, "Your silence means the support of the oppression and the oppressor. His name was Mohsen Shekari. Every international organization who is watching this bloodshed and not taking action is a disgrace to humanity."

==== Reactions ====
About 600 members of the international arts community from 30 different countries signed an open letter demanding Alidoosti's release. Signatories include Olivia Colman, Jessica Chastain, Cillian Murphy, Kristen Stewart, Dame Emma Thompson, Kate Winslet, Marion Cotillard, Isabelle Huppert, Juliette Binoche, Ken Loach, Alfonso Cuarón, Zahra Amir Ebrahimi, Golshifteh Farahani, Nazanin Boniadi, Penélope Cruz, Brian Eno, John Oliver, Mark Ruffalo, Ian McKellen, Lily James and Julie Christie.

Robert De Niro released a statement with the Tribeca Festival demanding Alidoosti's immediate release. Statements demanding her release were also issued by the Cannes Film Festival, the Berlinale, IFFR, IDFA and the European Film Academy.

==== Release ====
On 4 January 2023, Alidoosti was released after posting bail, reported to be around £20,000.

On 24 December 2025, in a short TV documentary for BBC Persian made by Pegah Ahangarani called Taraneh, Alidoosti spoke for the first time since the 2022 protests about her ban, illness with DRESS syndrome, views on cinema and her future.

== Filmography ==
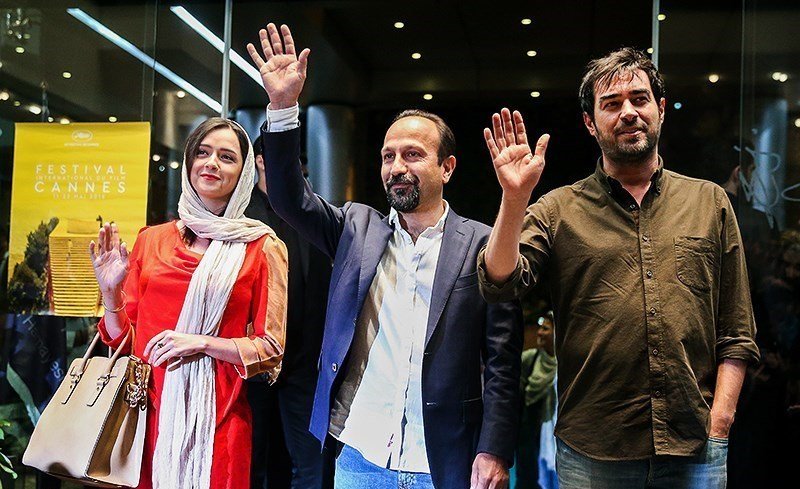
Alidoosti with Asghar Farhadi and Shahab Hosseini at The Salesman's press conference, May 2016

=== Film ===
Year	Title	Role	Director	Notes
2002	I'm Taraneh, 15	Taraneh Parnian	Rasoul Sadrameli	
2004	The Beautiful City	Firoozeh	Asghar Farhadi	
2005	Jamshid and Khorshid	Khorshid	Behrouz Yaghmaian	Animation; voice role
2006	Fireworks Wednesday	Rouhi	Asghar Farhadi	
2008	Canaan	Mina	Mani Haghighi	
2008	Shirin	Woman in audience	Abbas Kiarostami	
2009	About Elly	Elly	Asghar Farhadi	
2009	The Secret of Taran Plain	Nurse	Hatef Alimardani	
2009	Doubt	Mahtab	Varuzh Karim Masihi	
2010	Whatever God Wants	Parmida	Navid Mihandoost	
2010	Life with Closed Eyes	Parastoo	Rasul Sadrameli	
2011	At the End of 8th Street	Niloofar	Alireza Amini	
2012	Modest Reception	Leila	Mani Haghighi	
2013	The Shallow Yellow Sky	Ghazal	Bahram Tavakoli	
2014	The Wedlock	Sanaz	Rouhollah Hejazi	
2015	Atom Heart Mother	Arineh	Ali Ahmadzadeh	
2015	Absolute Rest	Samira	Abdolreza Kahani	
2016	The Salesman	Rana	Asghar Farhadi	
2019	Echo	Woman	Mahin Sadri	Short film
2021	Orca	Elham Asghari	Sahar Mosayebi	
2022	Hamid's Symphony	Herself	Jafar Sadeghi	Documentary
2022	Leila's Brothers	Leila Jourablou	Saeed Roustaee	
2022	Subtraction	Farzaneh / Bita Jabbari	Mani Haghighi	

=== Web ===
Year	Title	Role	Director	Platform
2015–2018	Shahrzad	Shahrzad Sa'adat	Hassan Fathi	Lotus Play

== Awards and nominations ==
Name of the award ceremony, year presented, category, nominee of the award, and the result of the nomination
Award	Year	Category	Nominated work	Result	Ref(s)
Cinefan Festival of Asian and Arab Cinema	2012	Best Actress	Modest Reception	Won	
Fajr Film Festival	2002	Best Actress in a Leading Role	I'm Taraneh 15	Won	
Fajr Film Festival	2004	Best Actress in a Leading Role	The Beautiful City	Nominated	
Fajr Film Festival	2006	Best Actress in a Supporting Role	Fireworks Wednesday	Honorary Diploma	
Fajr Film Festival	2009	Best Actress in a Leading Role	Doubt	Nominated	
Fajr Film Festival	2012	Best Actress in a Leading Role	Modest Reception	Nominated	
Fajr Film Festival	2013	Best Actress in a Leading Role	The Shallow Yellow Sky	Nominated	
Hafez Awards	2002	Best Actress – Motion Picture	I'm Taraneh 15	Nominated	
Hafez Awards	2005	Best Actress – Motion Picture	The Beautiful City	Nominated	
Hafez Awards	2011	Best Actress – Motion Picture	About Elly	Nominated	
Hafez Awards	2014	Best Actress – Motion Picture	Modest Reception	Nominated	
Hafez Awards	2015	Best Actress – Motion Picture	Absolute Rest	Nominated	
Hafez Awards	2016	Best Actress – Television Series Drama	Shahrzad	Nominated	
Hafez Awards	2017	Best Actress – Motion Picture	The Salesman	Nominated	
Hafez Awards	2018	Best Actress – Television Series Drama	Shahrzad	Nominated	
Hafez Awards	2024	Best Actress – Motion Picture	Subtraction	Nominated	
Iran Cinema Celebration	2004	Best Actress in a Leading Role	The Beautiful City	Nominated	
Iran Cinema Celebration	2006	Best Actress in a Supporting Role	Fireworks Wednesday	Won	
Iran Cinema Celebration	2014	Best Actress in a Leading Role	Life with Closed Eyes	Nominated	
Iran Cinema Celebration	2015	Best Actress in a Leading Role	Absolute Rest	Nominated	
Iran Cinema Celebration	2017	Best Actress in a Leading Role	The Salesman	Nominated	
Iran's Film Critics and Writers Association	2008	Best Actress in a Leading Role	Canaan	Nominated	
Iran's Film Critics and Writers Association	2009	Best Actress in a Leading Role	Doubt	Nominated	
Iran's Film Critics and Writers Association	2012	Best Actress in a Leading Role	Modest Reception	Nominated	
Iran's Film Critics and Writers Association	2013	Best Actress in a Leading Role	The Shallow Yellow Sky	Nominated	
Iran's Film Critics and Writers Association	2014	Best Actress in a Supporting Role	The Wedlock	Won	
Locarno International Film Festival	2002	Best Actress	I'm Taraneh 15	Won	
Vesoul International Film Festival	2013	Special Mention of the International Jury	Modest Reception	Won	

== See also ==
- Iranian cinema
- Detainees of the Mahsa Amini protests
- List of Iranian actresses
