= The Salesman (2016 film) =

2016 film

- theatrical release poster in Iran
- Directed by: Asghar Farhadi
- Written by: Asghar Farhadi
- Produced by: Alexandre Mallet-Guy; Asghar Farhadi
- Starring: Shahab Hosseini; Taraneh Alidoosti
- Cinematography: Hossein Jafarian
- Edited by: Hayedeh Safiyari
- Music by: Sattar Oraki
- Production companies: Memento Films Production; Asghar Farhadi Production; Arte France Cinéma
- Distributed by: Filmiran (Iran); Memento Films Distribution (France)
- Release dates: May 21, 2016 (Cannes); August 31, 2016 (Iran); November 2, 2016 (France)
- Running time: 125 minutes
- Countries: Iran; France
- Language: Persian
- Box office: 16.1 billion toman (Iran)

The Salesman (Persian: فروشنده, romanized: Forušande, released in France as Le Client) is a 2016 drama film written and directed by Asghar Farhadi and starring Taraneh Alidoosti and Shahab Hosseini. It is about a married couple who perform Arthur Miller's 1949 play Death of a Salesman on stage. When the wife is assaulted, her husband attempts to track down the attacker, while she struggles to cope with post-traumatic stress. Farhadi chose Miller's play as his story within a story based on shared themes. A co-production between Iran and France, the film was shot in Tehran, beginning in 2015.

The film premiered in competition in the 2016 Cannes Film Festival, where it won two awards—Best Screenplay for Farhadi and Best Actor for Hosseini. The Salesman was very well-received by film critics, who mainly praised Farhadi's direction and writing, and won the Academy Award for Best Foreign Language Film, being his second win after A Separation (2011). However, Farhadi did not attend the 89th Academy Awards ceremony in protest of the U.S. Executive Order 13769.

== Plot ==
Emad and Rana are a married couple who both work in the theatre, currently starring in a production of Death of a Salesman by Arthur Miller, with Emad portraying Willy Loman and Rana playing Linda. Emad is also a popular instructor at a local school, where the youth joke about him being a "salesman." One night, their apartment begins to collapse and they flee the building with the other residents. Knowing they need another place to live, their fellow actor Babak secures another apartment for them, where a woman has recently moved out, although she left in a hurry abandoning numerous belongings. The couple moves into the apartment and places the previous owner's belongings outside. One night, Rana is home alone and begins bathing. When Emad returns, he finds she is missing and the bathroom is covered with blood. He rushes to the hospital, where he is informed by his neighbours about his wife's condition and is told to change the apartment's locks. It becomes apparent that Rana has not had an accident, but has been assaulted by an intruder, to whom she opened the door using the intercom, thinking it was Emad returning home. Emad also learns from neighbours that the previous tenant was a prostitute who had conflicts with her clients.

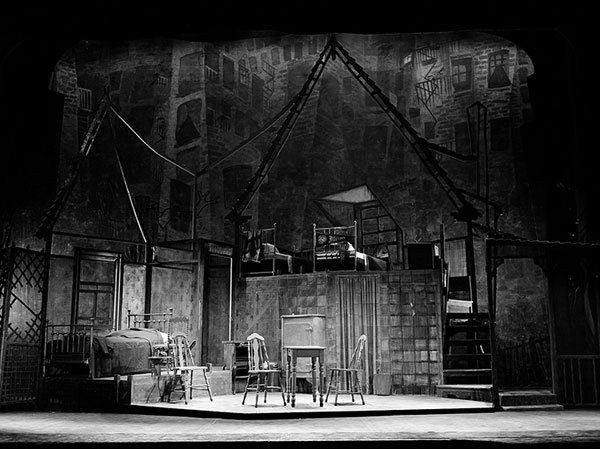
An empty set of Death of a Salesman

Rana returns home, but suffers from trauma and is reluctant to go to the police. She does not bathe, fearing to go into the bathroom again, and in the middle of a performance, breaks down in tears and leaves the stage. Although she does not remember the face of her attacker, Emad finds the culprit left his car keys, which he matches to a pick-up parked outside. The attacker also left behind a mobile phone and some money which Rana purchased groceries with, thinking Emad had left it for her. Emad increasingly blames Babak for hiding the truth about the former tenant. After he hears a loving message from Babak on the previous tenant's answering machine, he calls Babak's character Charley a degenerate in the midst of a performance, although this is not in Miller's script.

Finally, Emad turns to one of his students, whose father used to work for the police. He is able to trace the truck to a man named Majid. He pretends to need a mover to lure Majid to their now empty old apartment, but Majid's prospective father-in-law arrives instead. Gradually, it becomes apparent the older man was himself the intruder, though he denies attacking Rana, implying he simply startled her. Emad calls the old man's family to the apartment, and locks him in a small room to wait, intending to reveal his true character to them all. When he opens the room the old man appears to be having heart trouble and Emad calls Rana in a panic. When Rana learns what Emad intends, she says it will be over between them if he pursues his revenge.

When the family arrives they believe they have been called to a medical emergency, thanking Emad for saving his life. Just before they leave, Emad insists on settling his account with the old man in private, returning the money he had left after Rana's assault. Unseen by the family, Emad slaps the old man, who then collapses as he is leaving with his family, and they call an ambulance. Rana and Emad return to the theatre together.

== Cast ==
- Shahab Hosseini as Emad
- Taraneh Alidoosti as Rana
- Babak Karimi as Babak
- Farid Sajjad Hosseini as Piremard (The Old Man)
- Mina Sadati as Sanam
- Maral Baniadam as Kati
- Mehdi Koushki as Siavash
- Emad Emami as Ali
- Kian Rostami as Reza
- Alireza Rofougaran as Mr. Alimoradi
- Shirin Aghakashi as Esmat
- Mojtaba Pirzadeh as Majid
- Sahra Asadollahi as Mojgan
- Ehteram Boroumand as Mrs. Shahnazari
- Sam Valipour as Sadra

== Production ==
=== Development ===
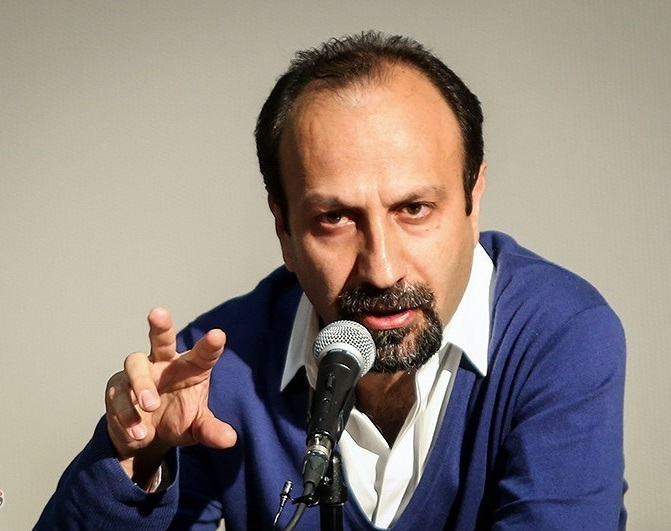
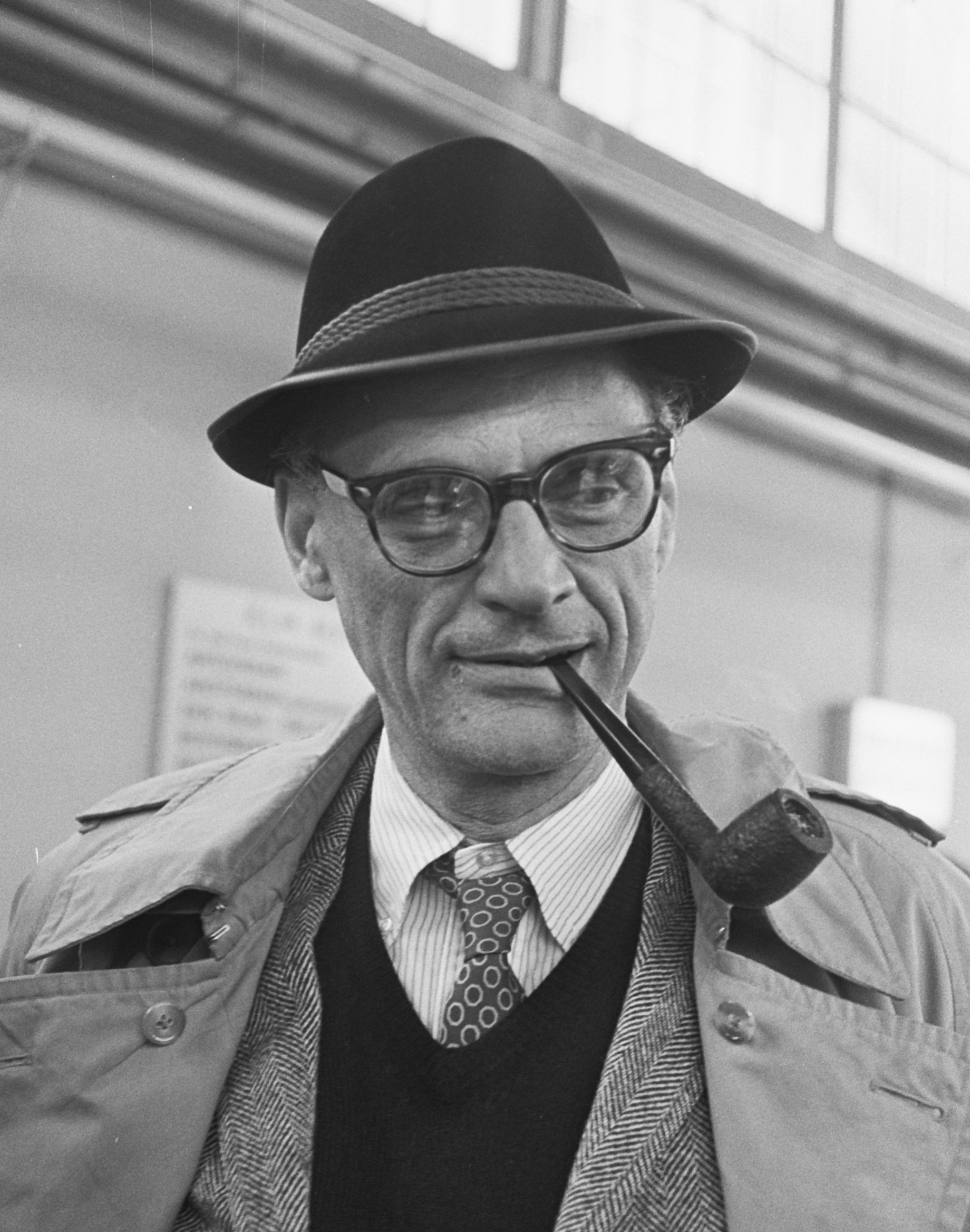
Director Asghar Farhadi believed his screenplay explored similar themes to Arthur Miller's play Death of a Salesman.

Iranian director Asghar Farhadi said he had conceived of much of the story for The Salesman years before production, but did not feel there was enough to make a film until he decided his protagonists should be stage actors. Part of this decision owed to Farhadi's own background in the theatre, and his desire to re-immerse himself in that atmosphere. He also felt actors had to think of themselves as other people and create empathy, and his male protagonist would be forced to feel empathy for another man.

Looking for a play within the film, Farhadi researched the work of Jean-Paul Sartre and Henrik Ibsen before finding Arthur Miller's Death of a Salesman, which he described as "a gift for me". In Miller's play and his script, Farhadi said he found parallel themes of "humiliation", and also compared the relationship between his characters Rana and Emad to that of Linda and Willy Loman. More symbolism was added with the crumbling buildings, which Farhadi said represented crumbling relationships.

=== Filming ===
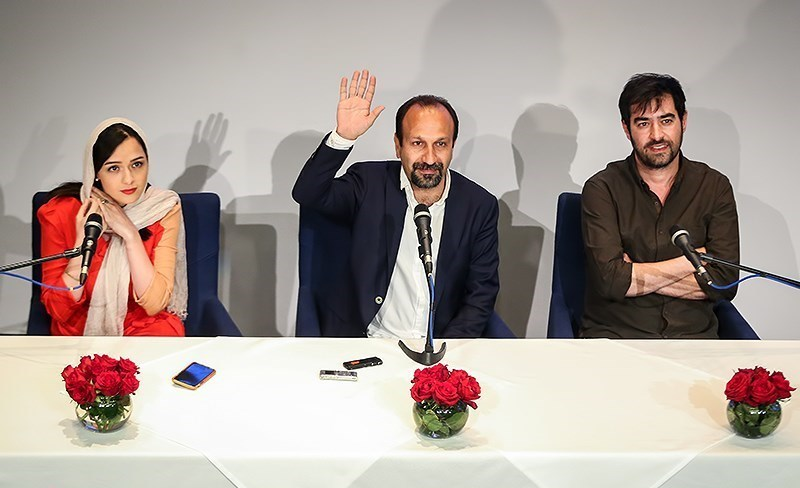
Farhadi, centre, with his stars Taraneh Alidoosti and Shahab Hosseini.

Although he was planning to film a Spanish language-project abroad, Farhadi opted to delay it to return to Tehran to make The Salesman in 2015. He cast Shahab Hosseini in the lead role, marking the third collaboration between the actor and director. Farhadi praised Hosseini for crafting diverse characters.

Other actors from Farhadi's 2011 film A Separation are featured, and he explained the connection was because his films are about young couples. The final scene was shot to appear very theatrical, with lighting from lamps.

== Release ==
The film premiered at the 2016 Cannes Film Festival, included in the Competition section. The film opened in Iran on 31 August, beginning in Tehran at an unconventionally early time of 6:45 am. It was also selected to play at the Toronto International Film Festival in September 2016, marking its first screening in North America. By 3 December, it grossed $4.2 million in Iran, the highest of any Iranian film to date.

The film premiered in London on 26 February 2017, with a free screening hosted by Mayor Sadiq Khan at Trafalgar Square. A general U.K. release followed on 17 March. Abramorama and Seattle's Northwest Film Forum made plans for a film series called The Seventh Art Stand, with screenings across the U.S. for May 2017, featuring The Salesman and other films from countries affected by the White House's second attempted travel ban, Executive Order 13780.

== Reception ==
=== Critical response ===
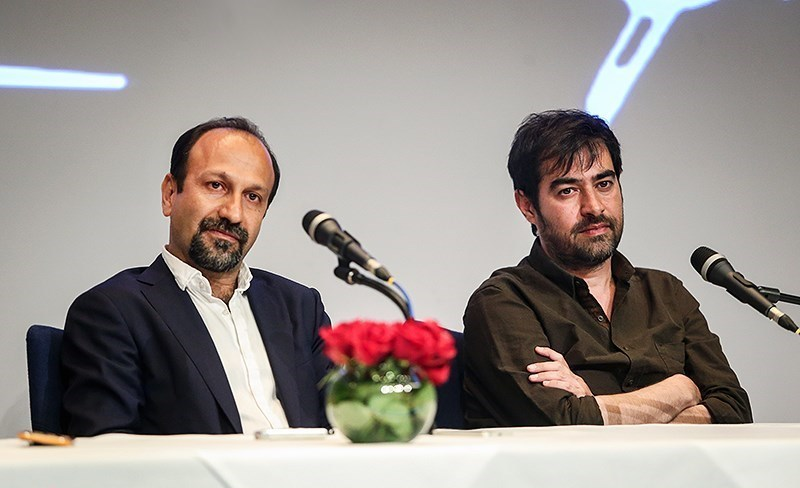
Farhadi's direction and Shahab Hosseini's performance received positive reviews.

The film received critical universal acclaim. On the review aggregator website Rotten Tomatoes, 96% of 199 critics' reviews are positive, with an average rating of 7.9/10. The website's consensus reads: "The Salesman takes an ambitiously complex look at thought-provoking themes, and the well-acted results prove another consistently absorbing entry in writer-director Asghar Farhadi's distinguished filmography." Metacritic, which uses a weighted average, assigned the film a score of 85 out of 100, based on 36 critics, indicating "universal acclaim".

After its Cannes screening, Owen Gleiberman wrote in Variety that, following Farhadi's A Separation and The Past, The Salesman "is another finely cut gem of neorealist suspense." Donald Clarke's review from The Irish Times stated that "The latest from Asghar Farhadi sees another family put under stress after a violent attack." Deborah Young in The Hollywood Reporter summarized the film as "Masterful particularly in the finale, but not so readily engaging." Time Out critic Dave Calhoun gave the film three of five stars, dissatisfied with the ending.

The film was supported by Iranian social media users, and after its screening and two awards at Cannes, some government officials and politicians congratulated Farhadi. However, conservatives accused the film of "portraying a dark image of Iranian society".

In The New York Times, A.O. Scott wrote it was not initially clear why Death of a Salesman was selected, but Willy Loman's presence soon became felt, and favourably compared the use of the play to All About My Mother's use of A Streetcar Named Desire. Peter Travers gave the film three and a half stars in Rolling Stone, praising it as "a dazzling, darkly funny, quietly devastating human drama." Entertainment Weekly gave it an A, with Joe McGovern writing the end had great impact. In The Globe and Mail, Kate Taylor gave it four stars, assessing the film as a subtle work with multiple dimensions. Jonathan Rosenbaum wrote in the Chicago Reader that the film was intense, comparing Farhadi to Elia Kazan. Conversely, Bilge Ebiri of LA Weekly wrote that, while Farhadi was talented in intensity and drama, this effort was artificial. The Guardian critic Peter Bradshaw gave it three stars out of five, assessing it as one of Farhadi's lesser films, "potent" but derivative. For The Independent, Geoffrey Macnab gave it four stars, praising Hosseini and Alidoosti's performances. Charlotte O'Sullivan gave it three stars out of five in the London Evening Standard, faulting the screenplay for lack of subtlety.

=== Accolades ===
At Cannes, Shahab Hosseini won the award for Best Actor and Asghar Farhadi won the award for Best Screenplay. It also won the unofficial "Palme de Whiskers" in recognition of a featured cat, "Mrow, the Tehran street cat". The film was the Iranian submission for Best Foreign Language Film, winning the Oscar at the 89th Academy Awards, marking Farhadi's second win after A Separation. The Persian playwright and filmmaker, Bahram Beyzai congratulated Farhadi on his Academy Award in a voice message played in public by Hayedeh Safiyari, the editor of the film.

Award	Date of ceremony	Category	Recipient(s)	Result	Ref.
Academy Awards	26 February 2017	Best Foreign Language Film	Iran	Won	
Asian Film Awards	21 March 2017	Best Screenplay	Asghar Farhadi	Won	
British Academy Film Awards	18 February 2018	Best Film Not in the English Language	Iran	Nominated	
Cannes Film Festival	11 – 22 May 2016	Asghar Farhadi	Best Screenplay	Won	
Cannes Film Festival	11 – 22 May 2016	Best Actor	Shahab Hosseini	Won	
Chicago International Film Festival	21 October 2016	Silver Hugo Special Jury Prize	Asghar Farhadi	Won	
Critics' Choice Movie Awards	11 December 2016	Best Foreign Language Film	Asghar Farhadi	Nominated	
Dallas–Fort Worth Film Critics Association	13 December 2016	Best Foreign Language Film	Asghar Farhadi	5th place	
Florida Film Critics Circle	23 December 2016	Best Foreign Language Film	Asghar Farhadi	Nominated	
Golden Globe Awards	8 January 2017	Best Foreign Language Film	Iran	Nominated	
Guldbagge Awards	22 January 2018	Best Foreign Film	Asghar Farhadi	Won	
Mumbai Film Festival	October 2016	Audience Choice Award	Asghar Farhadi	Won	
Munich Film Festival	23 June – 2 July 2016	Best International Film	Asghar Farhadi	Won	
National Board of Review	29 November 2016	Best Foreign Language Film	Asghar Farhadi	Won	
Online Film Critics Society	27 December 2016	Best Foreign Language Film	Asghar Farhadi	Nominated	
San Francisco Film Critics Circle	11 December 2016	Best Foreign Language Film	Asghar Farhadi	Nominated	
Satellite Awards	18 February 2017	Best Foreign Language Film	Asghar Farhadi	Won	
Valladolid International Film Festival	October 2016	Best Film	Asghar Farhadi	Won	
Vancouver International Film Festival	October 2016	Most Popular International Feature	Asghar Farhadi	Runner-up	
Washington D.C. Area Film Critics Association	4 December 2016	Best Foreign Language Film	Asghar Farhadi	Nominated	

== Academy Awards boycott ==
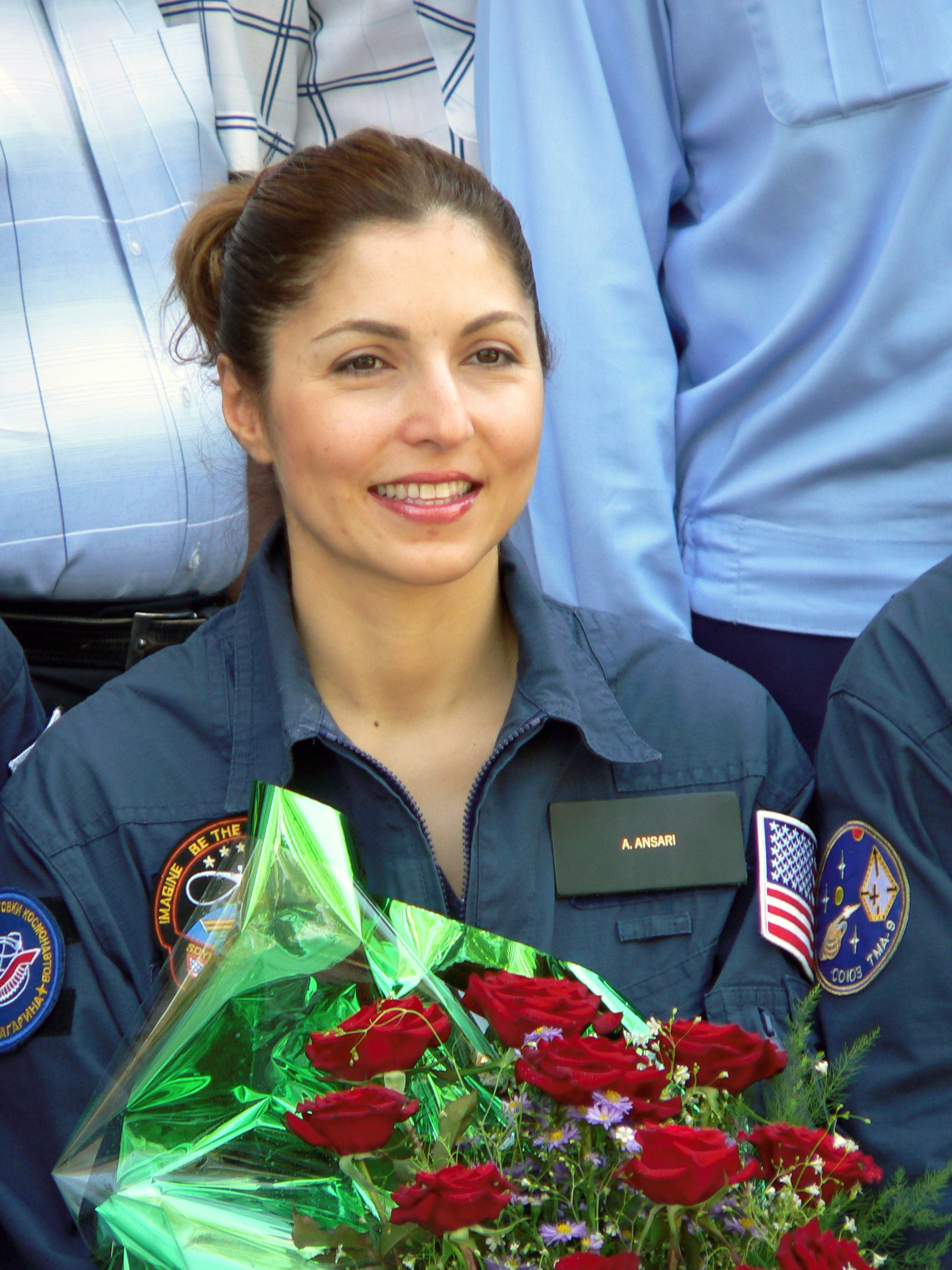
Anousheh Ansari represented Farhadi at the Academy Awards ceremony.

Following United States President Donald Trump's order which blocked entry of citizens from Iran and six other Muslim-majority countries to the U.S., on 26 January 2017 Alidoosti tweeted that she would boycott the Academy Awards in protest of the "racist" ban.

On 29 January, Farhadi wrote to The New York Times that he originally planned to attend the ceremony and draw the media's attention to "the unjust circumstances", believing the Academy of Motion Picture Arts and Sciences would share his moderate position. He also compared the ban to the rhetoric of hardliners in Iran. On 30 January, Australian director George Miller supported Asghar Farhadi's decision, saying that "irrational craziness" is "affecting the United States and the rest of the world," and some of Britain's filmmakers wrote a letter organized by Mark Donne to Hugh Grosvenor, 7th Duke of Westminster, for permission to hold an outdoor screening of The Salesman in London's Grosvenor Square "directly opposite the United States embassy building" on the night of the Academy Awards ceremony. When that plan floundered, Lily Cole, who was another signatory, brought in Sadiq Khan, the Mayor of London. Khan offered Trafalgar Square for a free screening.

On 3 February, La La Land director Damien Chazelle backed and praised Asghar Farhadi when he gave an acceptance speech for winning the top prize of Directors Guild of America Awards. Chazelle said that excluding filmmakers was "anti-art". On 19 February, United Talent Agency's head, Jeremy Zimmer, announced that UTA's annual Oscars party was cancelled and a protest rally would be held instead.

On 24 February, Farhadi announced that Anousheh Ansari, known as the first female space tourist, and Firouz Naderi, a former director of Solar System Exploration at NASA – would represent him at the Oscars ceremony. The night of the Oscar ceremony, 26 February, as the film won the Oscar for Best Foreign Language Film, Anousheh Ansari took to the stage to read from a prepared statement Farhadi had written which said in part "My absence is out of respect for the people of my country and those of the other six nations who have been disrespected by the inhumane law that bans entry of immigrants to the US."

== See also ==
- List of submissions to the 89th Academy Awards for Best Foreign Language Film
- List of Iranian submissions for the Academy Award for Best Foreign Language Film
