= Farewell Baghdad (2010 film) =

2010 film

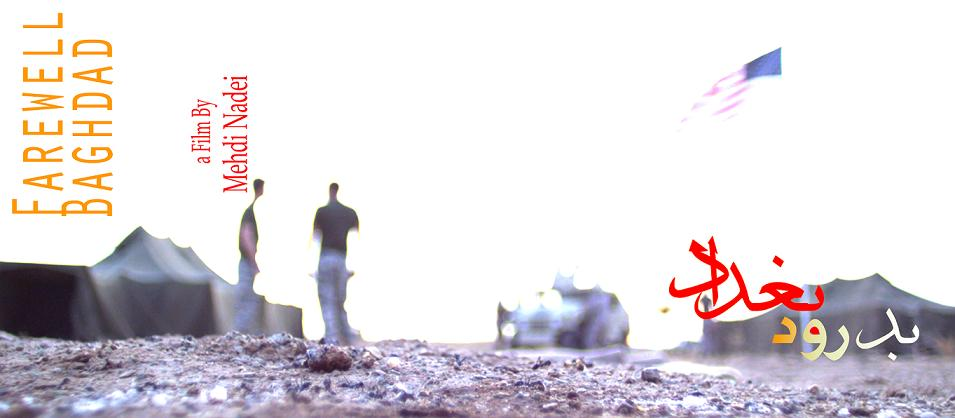
- Promotional poster
- Directed by: Mehdi Naderi
- Written by: Mehdi Naderi
- Produced by: DEFC
- Starring: Mazdak Mirabedini; Mostafa Zamani; Pantea Bahram
- Cinematography: Touraj Aslani
- Edited by: Mehdi Naderi; Hamid Najafirad
- Music by: Masoud Sekhavatdoost
- Release date: February 2010 (Fajr Film Festival)
- Running time: 97 minutes
- Country: Iran
- Languages: English; Arabic

Farewell Baghdad (Persian: بدرود بغداد) is a 2010 Iranian drama film directed by Mehdi Naderi. The film was selected as the Iranian entry for the Best Foreign Language Film at the 83rd Academy Awards, but did not make the final shortlist.

== Plot ==
The Polish-American boxer Daniel Dalca escapes his problems by enlisting in the army. After four years, when his mission is over, he is sent back home, where he would have to face his past problems. So he decides to desert the army. In the middle of a desert, he gets bitten by a scorpion.

On the very day of her marriage, 29 March 2003, Rebecca lost her husband during the British-American attack on Iraq. Today she is managing a little restaurant on the Iraqi borderline where she hosts Iraqi and American soldiers. She goes to the landmines to clear mines in order to plant trees and palms at the very same places.

Saleh Al Marzouk is an Iraqi math teacher who lost his family in the 29 March Baghdad bombings. Meanwhile, he is detained and later imprisoned at the infamous Abu Ghraib prison for three years. Disguised as a woman, he plans to blow himself up at a restaurant on Christmas Day in 2009. There, he suddenly discovers a picture of himself on the wall when Rebecca enters the restaurant. Shocked, Saleh runs away.

== Cast ==
- Mazdak Mirabedini as Daniel Dalca
- Pantea Bahram as Rebecca
- Mostafa Zamani as Saleh Al Marzouk
- Cyrus Saidi Mosanen as Lt. Sean Miller
- Reza Mohammady as Cpl. Nick Wilson
- Majid Bahrami
- Arya Shakeri
- Adnan Shahtalai

== See also ==
- List of submissions to the 83rd Academy Awards for Best Foreign Language Film
