= Makhmalbaf Film House =

Makhmalbaf Film House is a film production company started by Mohsen Makhmalbaf and his family in Iran. The production company, which comprises all his family members, continues to produce films from the United Kingdom. Their latest production was Marghe and Her Mother, released in 2019.

A number of books have been written about this production company and their importance in world cinema. The production house has produced more than 20 films in the past few decades.

== Members ==
- Mohsen Makhmalbaf
- Samira Makhmalbaf
- Maysam Makhmalbaf
- Hana Makhmalbaf
- Marziyeh Meshkiny

== Films ==
Year	English title	Original title	Length	Notes
1983	Pure Repentance	Tawba Nasuh	100 minutes	
1984	Two Blind Eyes	Do Cheshme Bisoo	102 minutes	
1984	Seeking Refuge	Isti'azah	89 minutes	
1986	Boycott	Boycott	95 minutes	
1987	The Peddler	Dastforoush	90 minutes	
1989	The Cyclist	Bicycleran	83 minutes	
1989	Marriage of the Blessed	Arousi-ye Khouban	70 minutes	
1990	The Nights of Zayande-rood	Shabhaye Zayandeh-rood	100 minutes/63 minutes (censored)	
1991	Time of Love	Nobat e Asheghi	70 minutes	
1992	Once Upon a Time, Cinema	Nasseroddin Shah Actor-e Cinema	92 minutes	
1993	Images from the Qajar Period	Tasvir Dar Doran-e Ghajar	18 minutes	Short documentary
1993	The Artist	Honarpisheh	86 minutes	
1993	Stone and Glass	Sang-o-Shisheh	20 minutes	Short documentary
1995	Hello Cinema	Salaam Cinema	81 minutes	Documentary
1996	A Moment of Innocence	Nun va Goldoon	78 minutes	
1996	Gabbeh		72 minutes	
1997	The School the Wind Blew Away	Madrese-i ke bad bord	8 minutes	Short
1998	The Silence	Sokout	74 minutes	
1999	Tales of Kish	Ghessé hayé kish	72 minutes	Segment The Door
2000	Tales of an Island	Dastanhaye Jazireh	76 minutes	Segment Testing Democracy
2001	Kandahar	Safar-e Ghandehar	85 minutes	
2001	The Afghan Alphabet	Alefbay-e afghan	46 minutes	Documentary
2005	Sex & Philosophy	Sex o phalsapheh	102 minutes	
2006	Scream of the Ants	Faryad moorcheha	85 minutes	
2006	The Chair	Sandali	8 minutes	Short
2009	The Man Who Came with the Snow		75 minutes	Co-directed with Marzieh Meshkini
2012	The Gardener	Bagheban	87 minutes	Documentary
2013	The Endless Smile	Labkhande-bi-payan	52 minutes	Documentary
2014	The President		118 minutes	
2015	The Tenant		18 minutes	Short
