= List of Iranian films of the 1990s =

A list of films produced in Iran ordered by year of release in the 1990s. For an alphabetical list of Iranian films see Category:Iranian films

== 1990s ==
Year	Title	Director	Actors	Genre	Notability
1990	Close-Up	Abbas Kiarostami		Documentary	
1990	Hamoun	Dariush Mehrjui	Khosro Shakibai, Bita Farrahi, Ezzatollah Entezami	Psychological drama	
1990	Time of Love	Mohsen Makhmalbaf		Drama	Shot in Turkey, banned in Iran. Screened at the 1995 Cannes Film Festival
1990	Snake Fang	Masoud Kimiai			Entered into the 41st Berlin International Film Festival
1991	Life and Nothing More...	Abbas Kiarostami		Drama	The second part of Kiarostami's Earthquake trilogy, screened at Cannes
1991	In the Alleys of Love	Khosrow Sinai			Screened at the 1991 Cannes Film Festival
1992	Baduk	Majid Majidi			Addresses child slavery
1992	Nargess	Rakhshan Bani-Etemad	Farimah Farjami, Atefeh Razavi	Drama	
1992	Naser-ed-din Shah	Mohsen Makhmalbaf	Ezzatollah Entezami	Comedic	
1992	Sara	Dariush Mehrjui	Niki Karimi	Drama	
1993	Actor	Mohsen Makhmalbaf	Akbar Abdi, Fatemeh Motamed-Aria	Drama	
1993	From Karkheh to Rhein	Ebrahim Hatamikia		Drama	
1994	Hello Cinema	Mohsen Makhmalbaf			Screened at the 1995 Cannes Film Festival
1994	Through the Olive Trees	Abbas Kiarostami		Drama	The third part of Kiarostami's Earthquake trilogy, entered at Cannes
1995	White Balloon	Jafar Panahi			
1995	The Fateful Day	Shahram Asadi	Ezzatolah Entezami, Mohammad-Ali Keshavarz, Jamshid Mashayekhi, Zhaleh Olov, Mehdi Fat'hi, Hossein Panahi	Historical	an adaptation of Bahram Beyzai's book of the same title, produced eventually ten years after writing
1995	Hello Cinema	Mohsen Makhmalbaf			
1995	Pari	Dariush Mehrjui	Niki Karimi		An adaptation of J. D. Salinger's Franny and Zooey
1996	Gabbeh	Mohsen Makhmalbaf			Title derived from a Persian rug Won Silver Screen Award at Singapore, screened at Cannes
1996	A Moment of Innocence	Mohsen Makhmalbaf			
1996	Leila	Dariush Mehrjui	Leila Hatami	Drama	
1996	Pedar	Majid Majidi		Drama	Won the Prize of the Jury at San Sebastián International Film Festival
1997	Children of Heaven	Majid Majidi	Majid Majidi		Nominated for Academy Award for Best Foreign Language Film
1997	Taste of Cherry	Abbas Kiarostami	Homayon Ershadi		Awarded the Palme d'Or at the 1997 Cannes Film Festival
1997	street kids	hojjat baqaee- Reza kabiri		Documentary film	at the 1996 social Film Festival - Appreciation by the Iranian police - Appreciation from the General Directorate of Guidance of Tehran Province - Appreciation at the Social Documentary Film Festival - Appreciation from Iran Welfare Organization
1997	The Silence	Mohsen Makhmalbaf		Drama	Received CinemAvvenire Award, Sergio Trasatti Award, nominated for Golden Lion at Venice Film Festival
1998	The Apple	Samira Makhmalbaf		Drama	Screened at the 1998 Cannes Film Festival
1998	Son of Maryam	Hamid Jebeli	Mohsen Falsafin; Rafik Dergabrilian; Hadi Nainizadeh	Drama	
1999	The Color of Paradise	Majid Majidi	Hossein Mahjoub, Mohsen Ramezani	Drama	
1999	Tales of Kish	Abolfazl Jalili, Mohsen Makhmalbaf, Nasser Taghvai			Entered into the 1999 Cannes Film Festival
1999	Two Women	Tahmineh Milani	Niki Karimi	Drama	
1999	The Wind Will Carry Us	Abbas Kiarostami			Silver Lion Award
