= Majid Entezami =

Majid Entezami مجید انتظامی
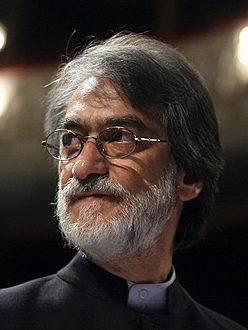

Background information
- Born: 9 March 1948 (age 78); Tehran, Iran
- Occupations: Composer, Conductor, Musician
- Instrument: oboe
- Years active: 1969-present
- Website: www.majidentezami.com

Majid Entezami (Persian: مجید انتظامی; born 9 March 1948) is an Iranian composer, conductor, musician and oboist.

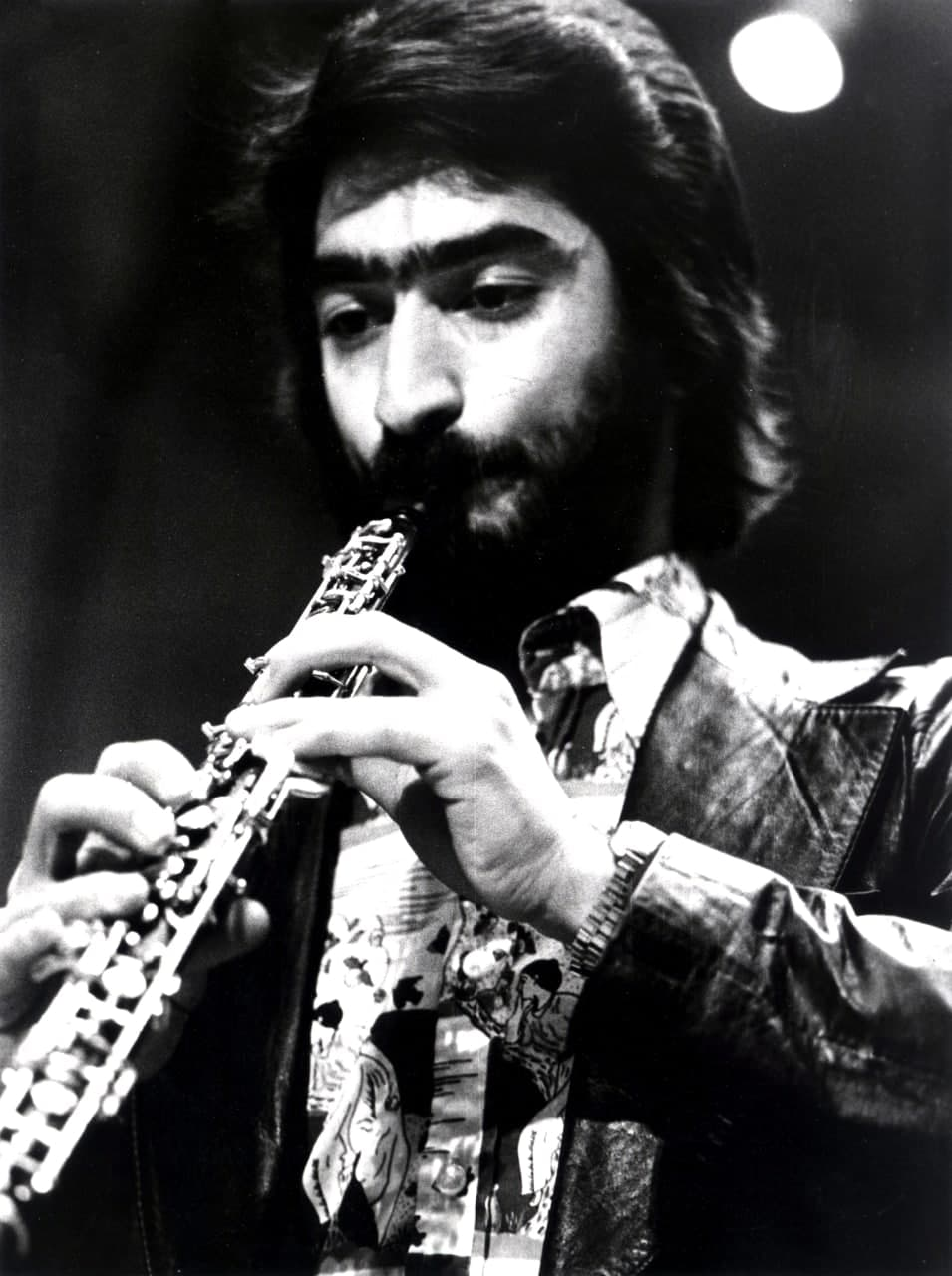
Entezami in the 1970s

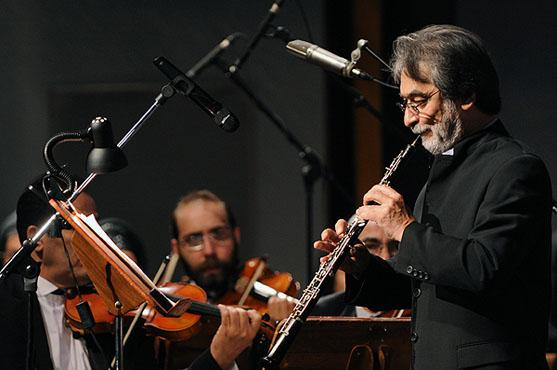
Entezami playing oboe concerto (Marcello) on 28 September 2010 in Roudaki Hall

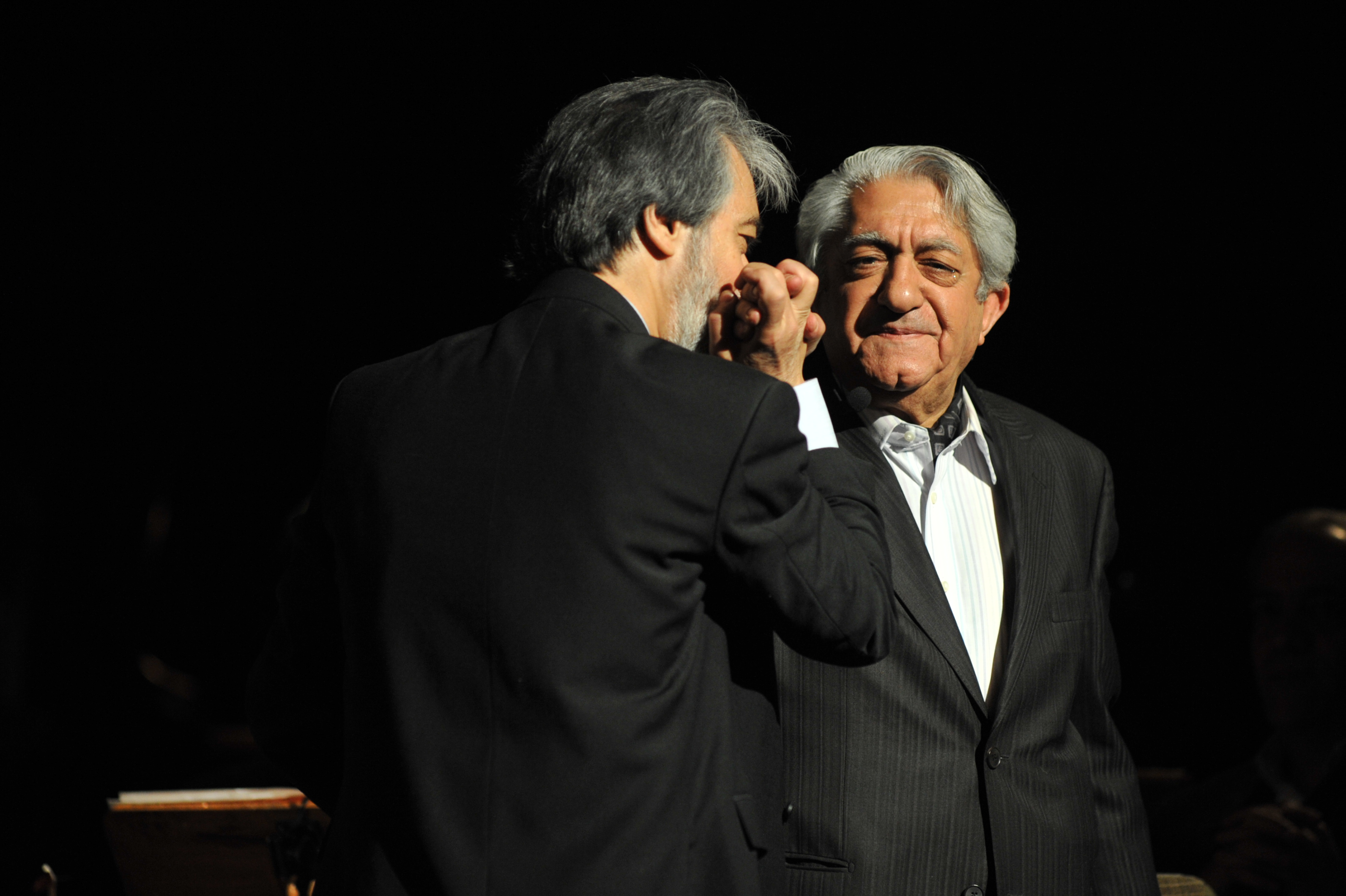
Majid Entezami with his father Ezzatollah Entezami

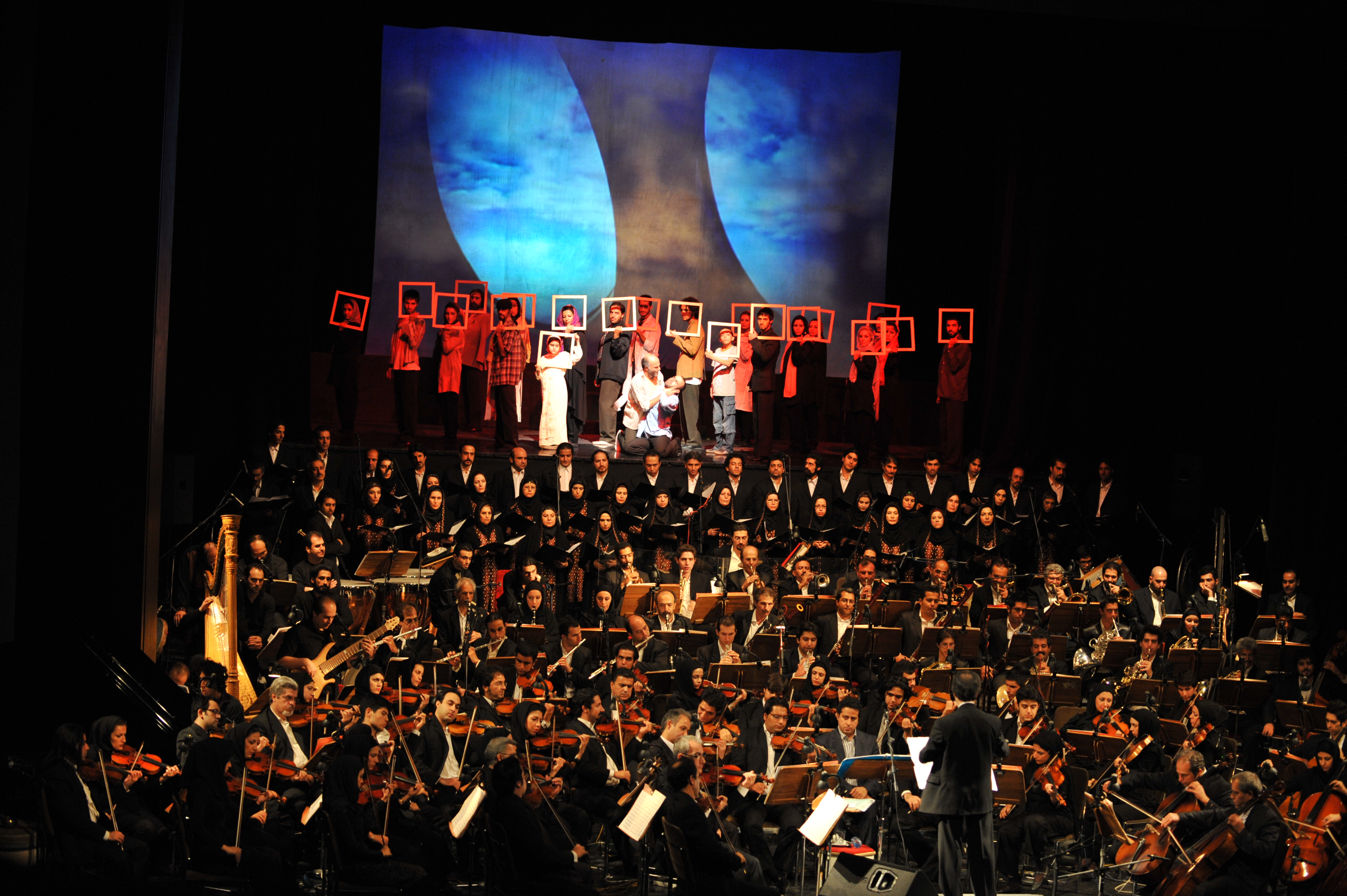
Conducting Tehran Symphonic Orchestra

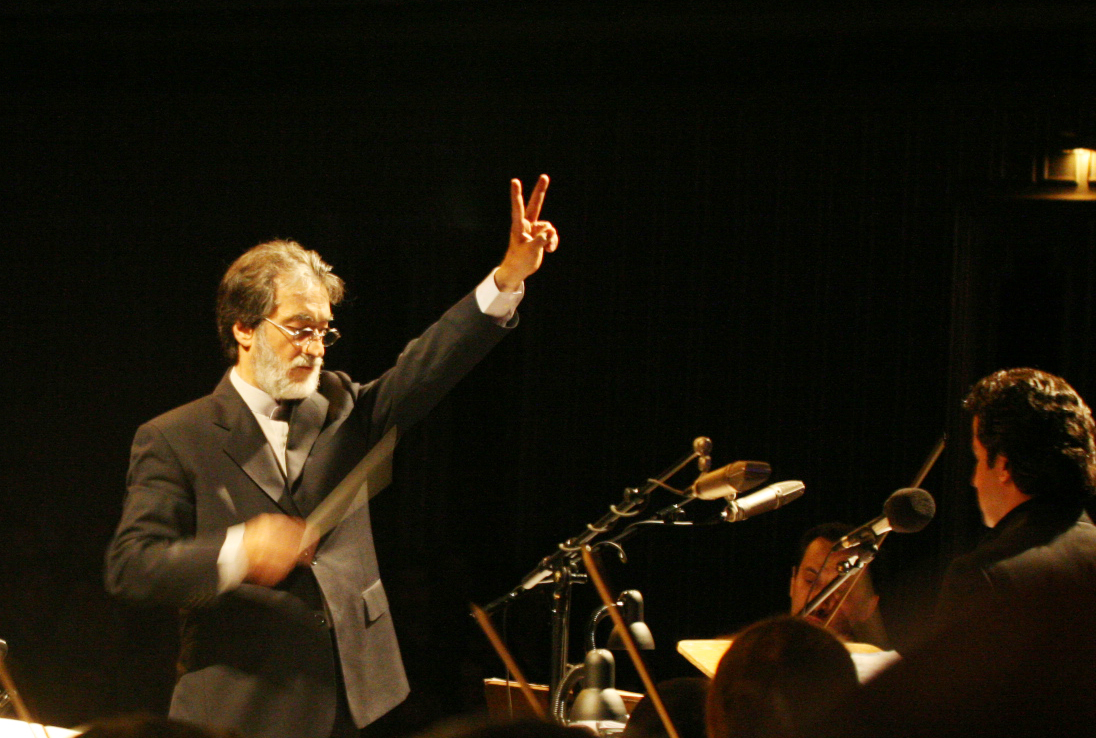
Conducting Tehran Symphonic Orchestra

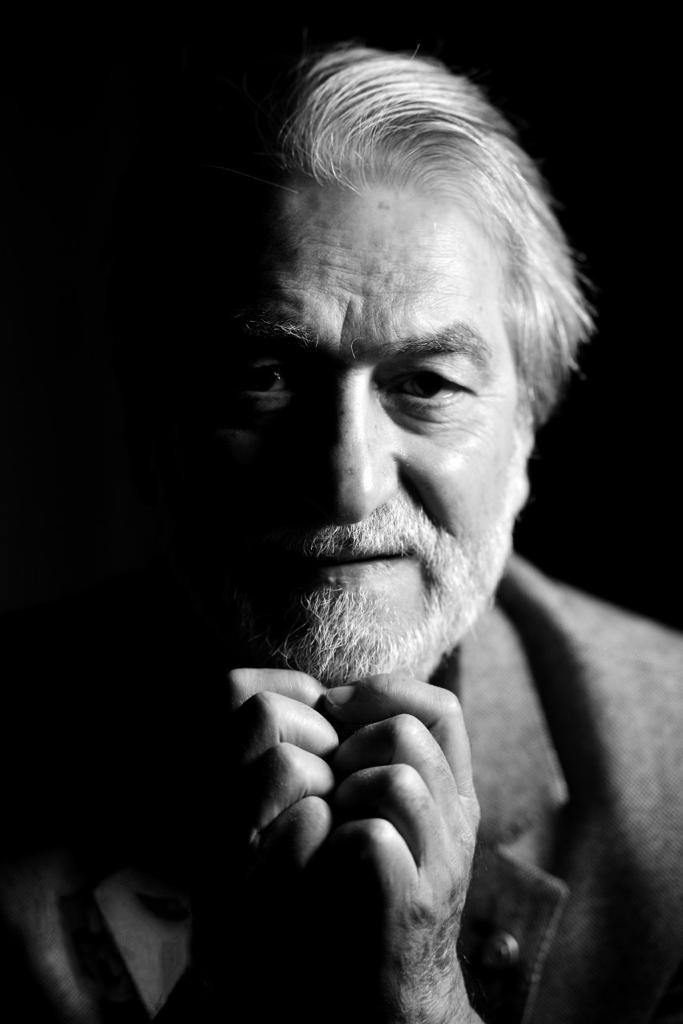
Majid Entezami portrait

== Discography ==
Score For Motion Picture
Year	Title	Director
1977	Zaal and Simorgh	Ali Akbar Sadeghi
1978	Journey of the Stone	Masoud Kimiai
1980	Sun-Dwellers	Mehdi Sabagh Zadeh
1981	In Siege	Ali Akbar Sadeghi
1982	The Red Line	Masoud Kimiai
1983	Senator	Mehdi Sabagh Zadeh
1983	Case	Mehdi Sabagh Zadeh
1984	Sardar-e Jangal	Amir Ghavidel
1985	The Eagles	Samuel Khachikian
1985	Tornado	Kamran Ghadakchian
1985	The Broken Gun	Mahdi Madanian
1986	High School	Akbar Sadeghi
1986	Plaque	Ebrahim Ghazizadeh
1986	The Thief and the Writer	Kazem Masoomi
1986	The Peddler	Mohsen Makhmalbaf
1986	The Assignment	Hossein Zandbaf
1986	The Passage	Shahriar Bahrani
1987	Kani Manga	Seifollah Dad
1987	Love Nest	Jalal Moghaddam
1987	Fright	Shahriar Bahrani
1987	Crisis	Aliasghar Shadravan
1988	The Cyclist	Mohsen Makhmalbaf
1988	The Pit	Ali Shah Hatami
1988	Canary Yellow	Rakhshān Banietemad
1988	The Dome of Light	Seyyed Ahmad Salehi
1989	Rajayi School	Karim Zargar
1989	O Negative	Ahmadreza Garshasbi
1989	The Last Flight	Ahmadreza Darvish
1990	The 29th Night	Hamid Rakhshani
1990	Fire Under Ashes	Habib Kavosh
1990	Glass Eye	Hossein Ghasemi Jami
1990	Lucifer	Ahmadreza Darvish
1990	The Sea For You	Ahmadreza Garshasbi
1990	The Dream of Marriage	Ebrahim Hatamikia
1990	Kowkab's Secret	Kazim Masoomi
1991	Deportees	Jahangir Jahangiri
1991	Avinar	Shahram Asadi
1991	Union of the God	Ebrahim Hatamikia
1991	Once Upon a Time, Cinema	Mohsen Makhmalbaf
1991	The Boots	Abdollah Bakieh
1992	The Unfinished Man	Moharram ZeinalZadeh
1992	The Bait	Faramarz Seddighi
1992	The Lightning	Ahmadreza Darvish
1992	From Karkheh To Rhein	Ebrahim Hatamikia
1992	Secret of the Knife	Mohammad Hossein Haghighi
1993	Suspicion	Kazim Masoomi
1993	The Last Hit	Davood Movasaghi
1993	Replicant	Jahangir Jahangiri
1994	The Path of Glory	Daryoosh Farhang
1994	The Last Blood	Manoochehr Masiri
1994	The Heart and Dagger	Masoud Jafari Jozani
1994	The Fateful Day	Shahram Asadi
1994	Attack on H-3	Shahriar Bahrani
1994	One Night, One Stranger	Hossein Ghasemi jami
1994	Great Expectation	Khosro Shojai
1995	The Survivor	Seifollah Dad
1995	The Summit of the World	Azizollah HamidNejad
1995	The Scent of Joseph's Shirt	Ebrahim Hatamikia
1995	The Enemy	Khosrow Parvizi
1995	A Moment of Innocence	Mohsen Makhmalbaf
1995	The Sunny Man	Homayoon As'adian
1996	Speed	MohammadHossein Latifi
1997	The Glass Agency	Ebrahim Hatamikia
1997	The Apple	Samira Makhmalbaf
1998	Love Without Frontier	Pouran Derakhshandeh
1999	Protest	Masoud Kimiai
2000	The Silence	Mohsen Makhmalbaf
2001	I Am Taraneh, I Am Fifteen Years Old	Rasul Sadr Ameli
2001	Noora	Mahmoud Shoolizadeh
2002	The Insane Flew Away	Ahmadreza Motamedi
2002	Naghmeh	Abolqasem Talebi
2004	Duel	AhmadReza Darvish
2004	Big Drum Under Left Foot	Kazim Masoomi
2004	A Place To Live	Mohammad Bozorgnia
2009	Intense Cold	Ali Roientan
2010	And The Blue Sky	Ghazaleh Soltani
2014	Karbala: The Geography of a History	Daryoush Yari
2014	P22	Hossein Ghasemi jami

Score For TV Series
Year	Title	
1988	The Wolves	ٍSeyyed Davood Mirbagheri
1996	Men of Angelos	Farajollah Salahshoor
1997	The Loneliest General	Mahdi Fakhimzadeh
1999	Saint Mary	Shahriar Bahrani
1998	The Trial	Hassan Hedayat
2001	Hujr Ibn Adi	Tajbakhsh Fanaian
2003	The Song of the Fog	Hossein Layalestani
2008	Sheikh Baha’I	Shahram Asadi
2012	Pahlavi Hat	Seyyed Ziaddin Dorry

Symphonies
Year	Title
1982	The Symphony of the Epic of Khorramshar
1996	Perspolis Suite
2005	Suite Symphony of Peace
2007	Suite Symphony of Sacrifice
2009	Suite Symphony of Revolution
2009	Suite Symphony of Resistance
2012	Karoon Suite
2013	Symphony of Victory
2013	Symphony of Epic

Documentaries about Majid Entezami

Four documentaries have been produced about Majid Entezami and his works. Three of them form a trilogy titled The Story of a Symphony (Parts I, II, and III), directed by Rouhollah Zamzameh. The trilogy presents a behind-the-scenes narrative of Entezami’s symphonic concerts and studio recordings made between 2009 and 2012. These films have been screened at several international events across Europe.
