= Dance Iranian Style =

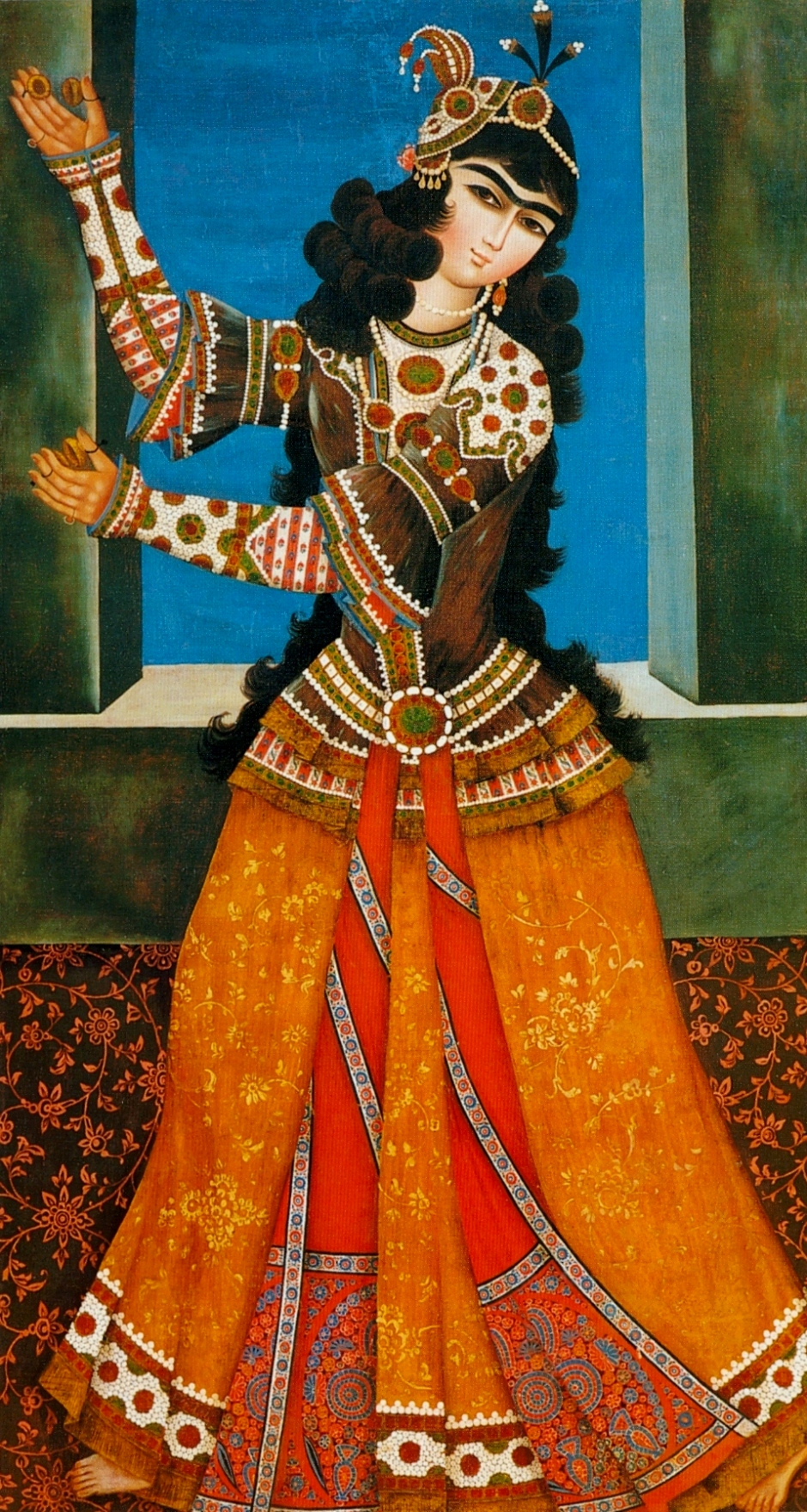
Dancing girl with castanets or zill

Dance Iranian Style (رقص به سبک ایرانی, Raghs be Sabke Irani) is a 2015 independent Dutch-Iranian feature mocumentary film written and produced by Nafiss Nia and directed by Farshad Aria.

While fiction and non-fiction elements are interwoven throughout the film, the story is told through a film-within-a-film structure in which we see a documentary film crew follow Roya, an illegal refugee in the Netherlands, after her refugee claim was denied and she has entered an illegal life on the streets of Amsterdam.

At its world première in September at the Cambridge Film Festival, Dance Iranian Style was described by the film critics as a surprising controversial film, calling it "a film that totally reframes the way in which stories are told" or "a film that reminds of Kiarostami's work".

At its second appearance in an international film festival the film won the jury award for "Best Feature Documentary" at the International Indian Cine Film Festival in Mumbai. The film won also the "Audience Choice Award" at the SCENECS International Debut Film Festival in the Netherlands.

== Plot ==
The film opens with a short interview scene, hearing refugees from different countries who have been denied permission to stay in the Netherlands. Roya, a young Iranian girl is the only one among them who waits still for the decision of the immigration service. After her refugee claim is denied by the Dutch Immigration Service, Roya enters an illegal life on the streets of Amsterdam. Attempting to capture the experiences of an illegal refugee, the crew of this documentary follows Roya at a distance. However it becomes difficult for the crew not to intervene.

== Cast ==
- Sarah Montazeri - [Roya]
- Sahand Sahebdivani - [Storyteller]
- Edon Rizvanolli - [Street Dancer]

== Production ==
In April 2011, a male Iranian "illegal refugee" who had been denied refugee status in the Netherland but for whom it was unsafe to return to their own country committed suicide by burning himself in the crowded city centre in Amsterdam and died one day later in the hospital. Affected by this event, Nafiss Nia and Farshad Aria decided to make illegal refugees the theme for their debut feature film. In 2014 they decided to make the film independently and through a guerrilla work style without using a traditional script. Inspired by film-makers and masterpieces of Iranian cinema such as: Still Life (1974) by Sohrab Shaheed Salles, The Marriage of the Blessed (1989) and A Moment of Innocence (1996) by Mohsen Makhmalbaf, Close-Up (1990) by Abbas Kiarostami, and The Mirror (1997) by Jafar Panahi, Dance Iranian Style is an attempt to blur the borders between fiction and documentary.

After the first screenings and based on the reactions of the audience the director writes:

"One of the most frequent questions people had after watching the film was whether certain parts in the film were fictional story or documentary? But I had no choice than to say that it's a question that I cannot answer. Exactly because it is what the audience is supposed to figure out for itself. The doubt surrounding the nature of the film is in fact an integral part of the viewing experience we've tried to create in the film.Truth or fiction? It is a reflection of the essential question refugees must face regularly, because hardly anyone believes their stories. A refugee is frequently obliged to tell the tale of his or her past, not only to the authorities but also to ordinary people, even years after obtaining a residence permit and settling down. But each time they tell their stories, they see doubt in the face of the listener: Is this truth or fiction? By leaving the answer to this question to the audience to decide, we in fact try to confront them with their biases and prejudices."

Inspired by the working method of the British filmmaker, Mike Leigh, Dance Iranian Style is shot entirely through an improvisational work style. It was shot in 20 days and required almost a full year of editing.
