= Marzieh Meshkini =

Iranian filmmaker

- مرضیه مشکینی
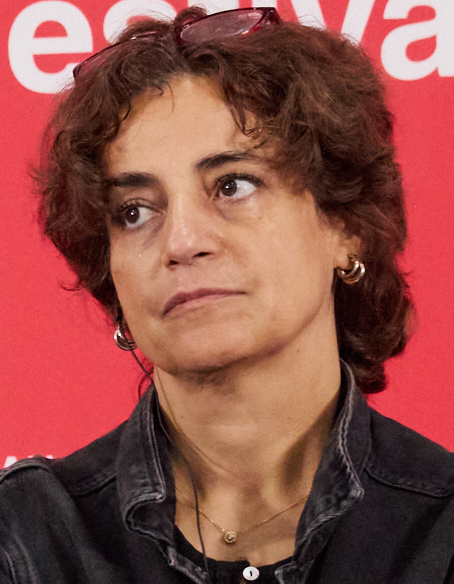
- Meshkini in 2025
- Born: 1969 (age 56–57); Tehran, Imperial State of Iran
- Education: University of Tehran
- Occupations: Filmmaker; writer
- Years active: 1996–present
- Spouse: Mohsen Makhmalbaf (m. 1987)
- Children: Hana Makhmalbaf

Marzieh Meshkini (Persian: مرضیه مشکینی) (born 1969 in Tehran) is an Iranian cinematographer, film director and writer. She is married to filmmaker Mohsen Makhmalbaf, who wrote the script for her debut film The Day I Became a Woman.

== Personal life ==
Marzieh Meshkini was born in Tehran in 1969 and studied geology and biology at the University of Tehran.

She is married to director Mohsen Makhmalbaf, whose first wife (Meshkini's sister Fatemeh, who died in a fire) is the mother to his two children Samira and Meysam. Marzieh Meshkini also had a daughter with Makhmalbaf, Hana. All members of the family are filmmakers and part of the Makhmalbaf Film House.

== Work ==
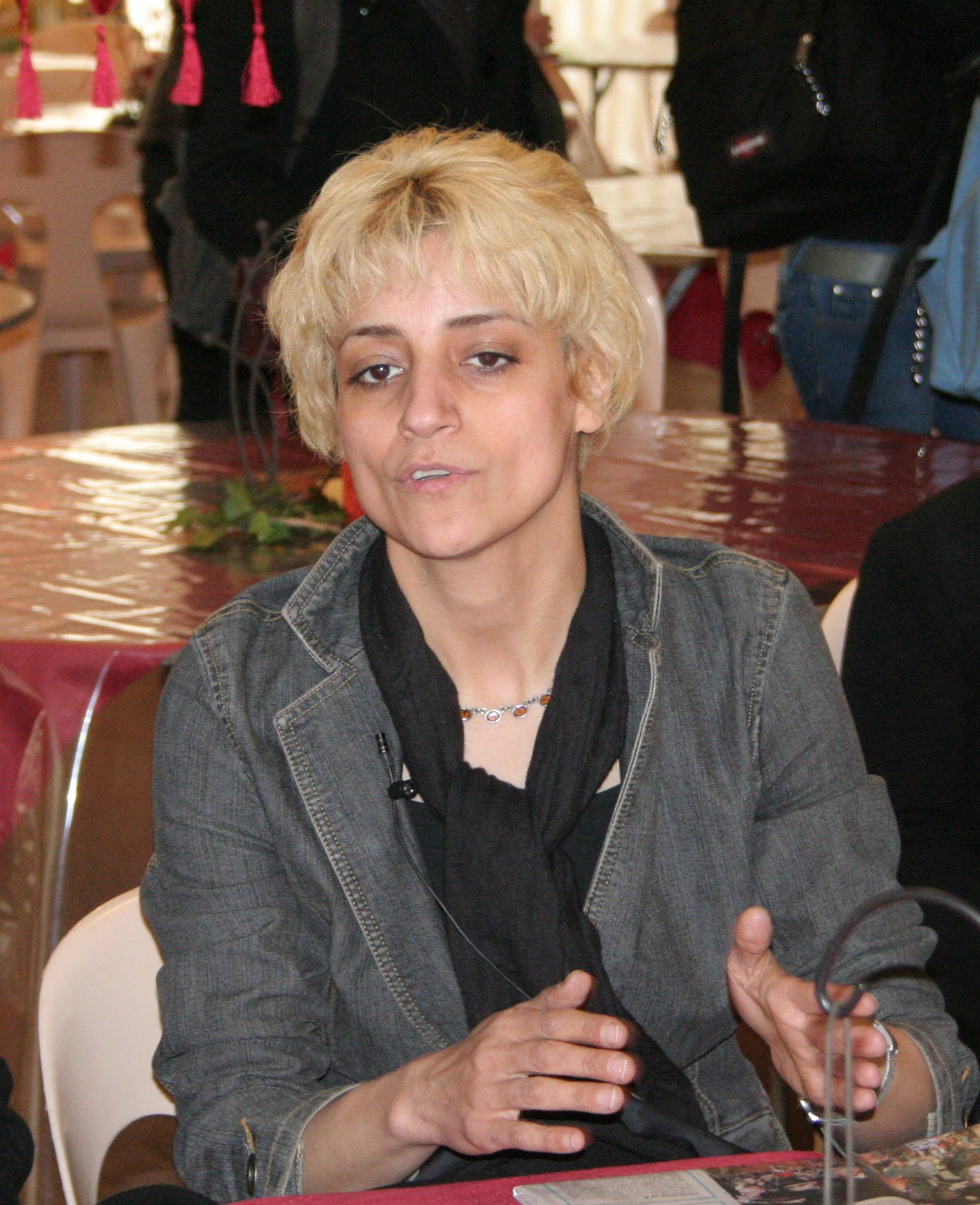
Meshkini at Vesoul International Film Festival of Asian Cinema in 2009

Marzieh Meshkini studied cinema at the Makhmalbaf Film School, established as part of the Makhmalbaf Film House in the mid-1990s. She has worked on several films from the MFH platform, including serving as the assistant director on Samira Makhmalbaf's 1998 film, The Apple (Sib), and writing the script for Hana Makhmalbaf's first feature film, Buddha Collapsed out of Shame (Buda az Sharm foru Rikht, 2007).

During the presidency of Mohammad Khatami, the relative openness in Iran allowed a number of women, including Meshkini, Samira Makhmalbaf, Rakhshan Banietemad and Mania Akbari, to be involved in all types of film: feature, documentary, video art, shorts, etc. Meshkini was thus part of a new wave of female directors who could finally see filmmaking as a legitimate career for women.

In 2000, Meshkini became the first Iranian woman to win awards at the 57th Venice International Film Festival for her debut film, The Day I Became a Woman.

After this, she continued to work on numerous films with the MFH in different capacities. She also directed the Afghanistan-set Stray Dogs (2004) and co-directed The Man Who Came with the Snow (2009).

== Critical reception ==
Within Meshkini's directorial work, The Day I Became a Woman was especially well-regarded, with Hamid Reza Sadr calling the film "perhaps the quintessential film about contemporary femininity." Sight & Sound called it a "startlingly simple and ravishing debut" and included it in its 2015 list of 100 overlooked films directed by women.

Reviews on Stray Dogs were more divisive. Contrary to his highly favorable review of The Day I Became a Woman Peter Bradshaw described his viewing experience as follows: "What a strange, perplexing and ultimately exasperating film it is."

== Censorship ==
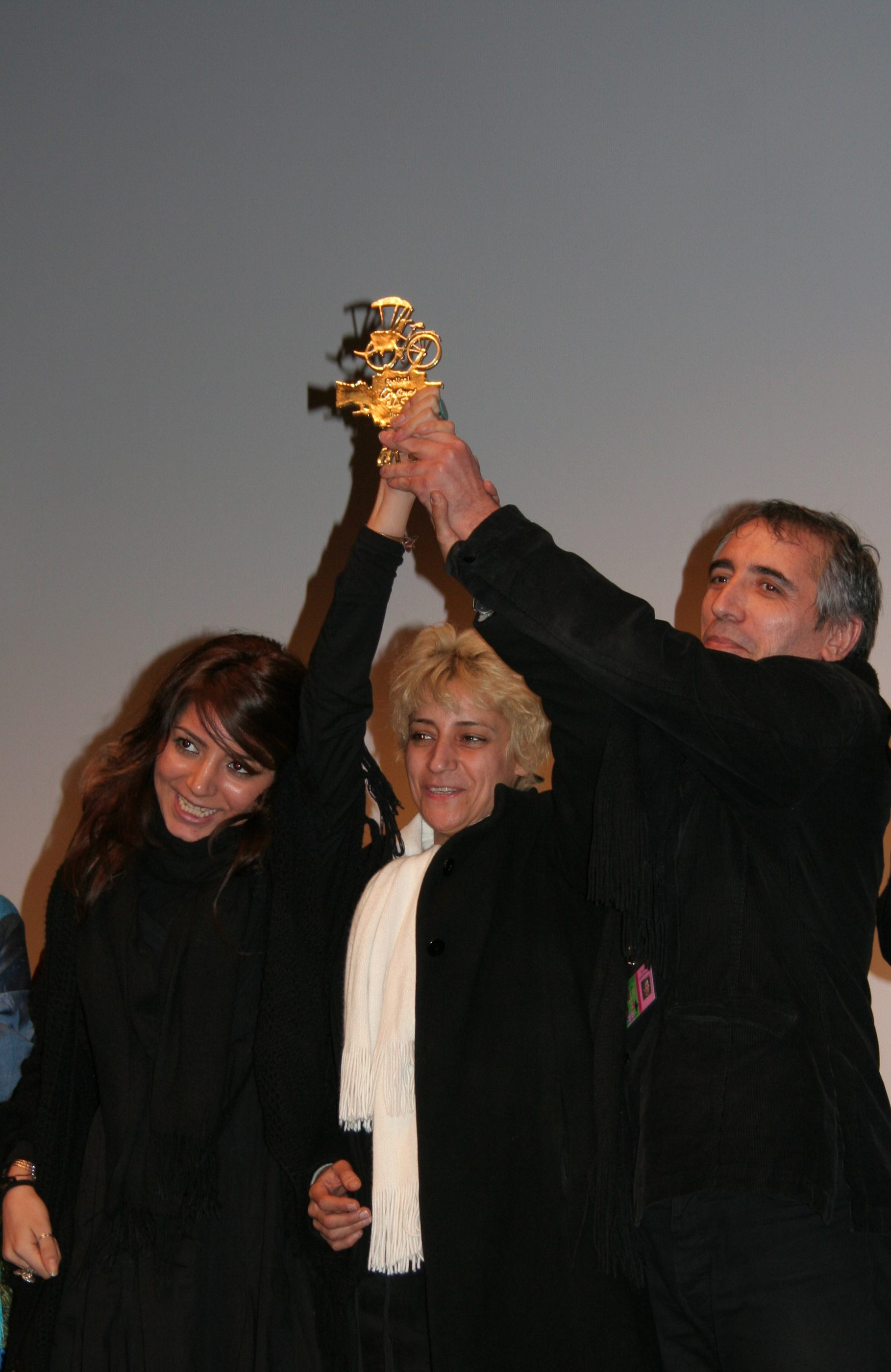
Hana Makhmalbaf, Marziyeh Meshkini and Mohsen Makhmalbaf winning the Golden Cyclo at the Vesoul International Film Festival of Asian Cinema in 2009

Similar to other prominent directors such as Abbas Kiarostami and Samira Makhmalbaf, Meshkini has positive views on the role of censorship in Iranian cinema. Since American films can not be shown in Tehran, Iranian filmmakers also cannot be influenced by them. This allows the Iranian film world to create a cinema of its own. Censorship forces filmmakers to approach their topics in a new way, and can therefore be a source of inspiration.[2] With The Day I Became a Woman, Meshkini is allegorically testing the limits and flexibility of the Iranian government's censorship rules, especially with regards to the restrictions imposed on the representation of women.

== Honors and awards ==
- Silver Hugo (Best First Film) for The Day I Became a Woman, Chicago International Film Festival (2000)
- UNESCO Award for The Day I Became a Woman, 57th Venice International Film Festival (2000)
- Isvema Award for The Day I Became a Woman, 57th Venice International Film Festival (2000)
- Best First Film CinemAvvenire Award for The Day I Became a Woman, 57th Venice International Film Festival (2000)
- Open Prize for Stray Dogs, 61st Venice International Film Festival (2004)
- NETPAC/FIPRESCI Award for Stray Dogs, 18th Singapore International Film Festival Silver Screen Awards (2005)
- Jury member: In September 2025, Meshkini served as a member of the Competition Jury at the 30th Busan International Film Festival.

== Filmography ==
Year	Title	Director	Script writer	Assistant Director	Cinematographer	Editor
1998	The Apple			✔		
2000	Blackboards			✔		
2000	The Day I Became a Woman	✔	✔			
2002	11'09"01 - September 11			✔		
2002	The Afghan Alphabet				✔	
2003	At Five in the Afternoon			✔		
2004	Stray Dogs	✔	✔			
2005	Sex & Philosophy			✔		
2007	Buddha Collapsed Out of Shame		✔			
2008	Two-legged Horse			✔		
2009	The Man Who Came with the Snow	✔				
2013	Ongoing Smile					✔
2014	The President		✔			✔
2019	Marghe and Her Mother		✔			

== See also ==
- Cinema of Iran
