= Little Bird of Happiness =

Film directed by Pouran Derakhshandeh

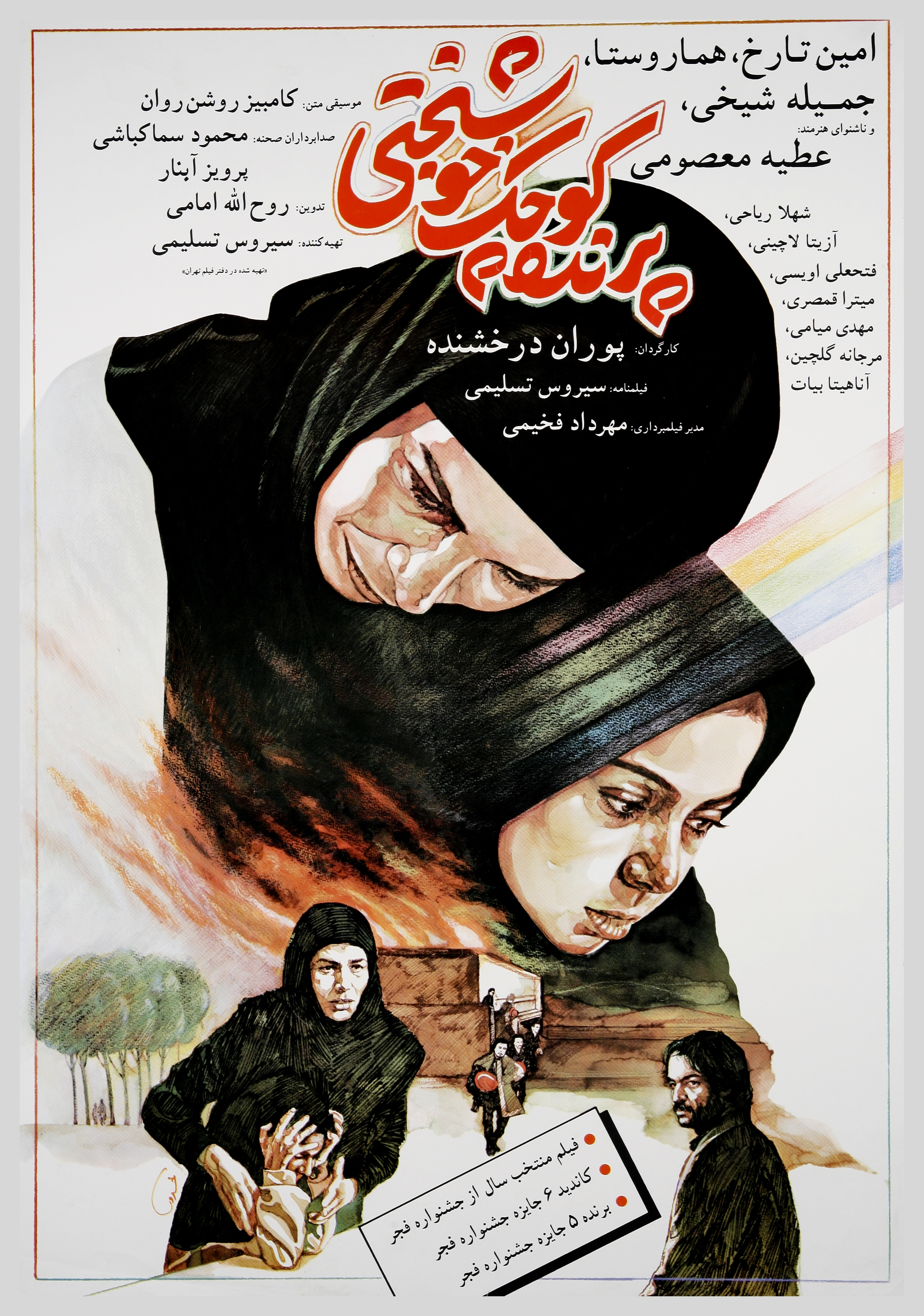
Film poster

Little Bird of Happiness (1988, Persian: پرنده کوچک خوشبختی) is an Iranian film by the director Pouran Derakhshandeh. The script was written by Sirus Taslimi. The original Persian title is Parande-ye koochak-e khoshbakhti. The film won the Crystal Simorgh for Best Film (co-winner with Kani Manga by Seifollah Dad).
