= Mahmoud Kalari =

Mahmoud Kalari محمود کلاری
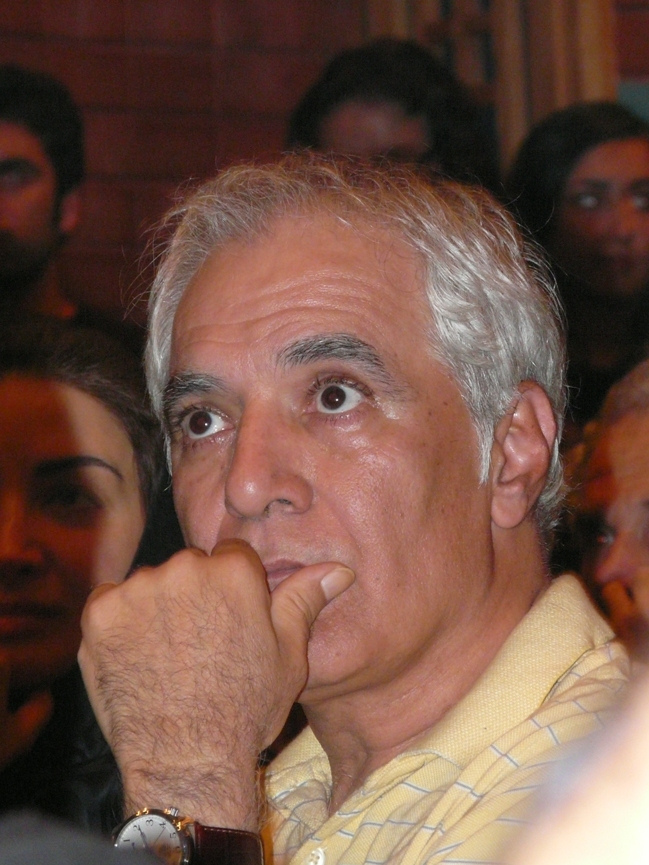
- Born: Tehran, Iran
- Occupations: Cinematography, screenwriter, Film Director, photographer

Mahmoud Kalari (Persian: محمود کلاری; born in Tehran) is an Iranian cinematographer, screenwriter, film director, and photographer who has worked with a number of renowned Iranian directors such as Abbas Kiarostami, Jafar Panahi, Asghar Farhadi, and Mohsen Makhmalbaf.

After completing photography courses in the United States, he held his first photo exhibition titled "Visit with People Around Us" at Tehran University in 1976. A few years later he was employed by the Paris-based Sigma Photo News Agency and worked for them for four years. In 1980, he was ranked one of the '15 Best Photographers of the Year' by Time Magazine, and his photos could be seen in French, German, and American magazines. Kalari moved back to Iran and from 1982 to 1984 worked as the supervisor of the Tehran National TV Photography Unit.

Kalari started his film career in 1984 as the cinematographer of Jadehay sard (1985) (Frosty Roads) for which he won the Best Cinematography award at Tehran's Fajr International Film Festival. He has shot more than 65 films since then, including some of the most critically acclaimed and talked about movies in Iran and internationally. Among those are: Sorb (1988) (winner of the best cinematography), Reyhaneh (1995) (screened at San Sebastián International Film Festival), Time of Love (1990) (filmed in Turkey and screened at the Cannes Film Festival), From Karkheh to Rein (1990) (filmed in Germany and screened at the Hamburg and Mannheim Film Festivals), Sara (1992) (screened at the San Sebastián, New York City, Los Angeles, and Chicago Film Festivals), Salaam Cinema (1995) (screened at the Montréal, Toronto, Los Angeles, New York, and Cannes Film Festivals), Gabbeh (1996) (screened at Cannes, Montreal, Toronto, Vancouver, New York, Los Angeles and 21 other International Film Festivals around the world, winner of Best Cinematography at Fajr International Film Festival and winner of Fujifilm Motion Picture Award), Leila (1997) (screened at 7 international film festivals and the winner of the best cinematography at Fajr Film Festival), Derakhte Golabi (1998) (winner of Silver Hugo at Chicago Film Festival and chosen as the Best Motion Picture Photography by the international jury of the Fajr Film Festival), The Wind Will Carry Us (1999) for which Kalari received nominations for Best Cinematography in the Main Competition of Plus CAMEIMAGE International Film Festival of the Art of Cinematography, and Offside (2006) (screened at the Berlin, New York, and AFI Film Festivals).

Kalari's directorial debut was Abe-O Aftaab (1997) on which he was also the writer and cinematographer. It was screened at the Montreal and Chicago Film Festivals and won the Best Film award at Argentina's Mar del Plata Film Festival.

Kalari was selected as a Jury Panelist for the Poland Film Festival both in 1999 and 2000. In 2001, Nant Festival in Paris held a tribute to his work as a photographer and exhibited his photographs. In 2005 he won the best cinematography award for Bab'Aziz (2005), directed by Tunisian-French director Nacer Khemir, from the Tatarstan International Muslim Film Festival. Later, a gallery of his photos shot during the Iranian Revolution of 1979 was opened to the public, and a photo book of his work from that era was published. Kalari's work on the internationally critically acclaimed and Oscar-winning film A Separation (2011), earned him a Silver Frog from the Plus Camerimage International Film Festival of the Art of Cinematography in 2011.
