= List of Tajikistani submissions for the Academy Award for Best International Feature Film =

Best International Feature Film submissions from Tajikistan

Highlights
- Debut: 1999
- Submissions: 4
- Nominations: none
- Oscar winners: none

Tajikistan has submitted films for the Academy Award for Best International Feature Film (Note: The category was previously named the Academy Award for Best Foreign Language Film, but this was changed to the Academy Award for Best International Feature Film in April 2019, after the Academy deemed the word "Foreign" to be outdated.) since 1999. The award is handed out annually by the United States Academy of Motion Picture Arts and Sciences to a feature-length motion picture produced outside the United States that contains primarily non-English dialogue. It was not created until the 1956 Academy Awards, in which a competitive Academy Award of Merit, known as the Best Foreign Language Film Award, was created for non-English speaking films, and has been given annually since.

As of 2026, Tajikistan has submitted four films, but none of them were nominated.

== Submissions ==
The Academy of Motion Picture Arts and Sciences has invited the film industries of various countries to submit their best film for the Academy Award for Best International Feature Film since 1956. The International Feature Film Committee oversees the process and reviews all the submitted films. Following this, they vote via secret ballot to determine the five nominees for the award.

Sex & Philosophy (2005), a romantic drama, was the second film submitted by Tajikistan, in October 2005, AMPAS announced the film had been accepted. Directed by Iranian filmmaker Mohsen Makhmalbaf, filmed in Tajikistan with an all-Tajik cast, Iranian censorship regulations made it impossible for Makhmalbaf to make the film as he wanted in Iran. He chose Tajikistan because both countries speak different dialects of the same language (Persian). However, the film was disqualified a month later when a print of the film failed to arrive in Los Angeles in time for its scheduled screening.

Below is a list of the films that have been submitted by Tajikistan for review by the academy for the award by year and the respective Academy Awards ceremony.

Year (Ceremony)	Film title used in nomination	Original title	Language(s)	Director(s)	Result
1999 (72nd)	Luna Papa	Лунный папа	Russian	Bakhtyar Khudojnazarov	Not nominated
2005 (78th)	Sex & Philosophy	سکس و فلسفه	Tajik, Russian	Mohsen Makhmalbaf	Disqualified
2023 (96th)	Melody	ملودی	Persian	Behrouz Sebt Rasoul	Not on the final list
2024 (97th)	Melody	ملودی	Persian	Behrouz Sebt Rasoul	Not nominated
2025 (98th)	Black Rabbit, White Rabbit	Харгӯши сиёҳ, харгӯши сафед	Tajik, Russian	Shahram Mokri	Not on the final list

== See also ==
- List of Academy Award winners and nominees for Best International Feature Film
- List of Academy Award-winning foreign language films

== Notes ==
- ^{A} Tajikistan's submission to the 78th Academy Awards, Sex & Philosophy, was disqualified because it did not arrive at the academy on time.
