= Time to Love =

Time to Love may refer to:

== Film ==
- Time to Love (1927 film), a 1927 American silent comedy
- Time to Love (1965 film), a 1965 Turkish drama by Metin Erksan
- A Time to Love (film), a 2005 romantic drama film
- A Time to Love and a Time to Die, a 1958 film by Douglas Sirk

== Music ==
- A Time to Love (album), a 2005 studio album by Stevie Wonder, and the title song
- "Time to Love" (song), a 2013 song by Ivi Adamou
- "TTL (Time to Love)", a 2009 song by T-ara and Supernova

== Other ==
- "A time to love", a quote from Ecclesiastes 3
- A Time to Love, a 2004 science fiction novel by Robert Greenberger, part of the Star Trek: A Time to... series

== See also ==
- Time and Love (disambiguation)
- "Time Is Love", a 2012 song by Josh Turner
- Time of Love, a 1990 Iranian film
