= The Peddler =

- Directed by: Mohsen Makhmalbaf
- Written by: Mohsen Makhmalbaf
- Starring: Mahmoud Basiri; Behzad Behzadpour; Zohreh Sarmadi; Esmail Soltanian; Morteza Zarrabi; Moharram Zaynalzadeh
- Cinematography: Mehrdad Fakhimi; Homayun Pievar; Ali Reza Zarrindast
- Edited by: Mohsen Makhmalbaf
- Music by: Majid Entezami
- Release date: 1987
- Running time: 95 min.
- Country: Iran
- Language: Persian

The Peddler is a 1987 Iranian drama film directed by Mohsen Makhmalbaf. The music was composed by Majid Entezami. The film stars Mahmoud Basiri, Behzad Behzadpour, Zohreh Sarmadi and Esmail Soltanian.

== Story ==
The film is made up of three sketches. One is about an impoverished Tehran couple who already have four disabled children. When the fifth one comes along, they try to have it adopted in the hope it will not suffer the same fate as the others.

== Cast ==
- Mahmoud Basiri
- Behzad Behzadpour
- Zohreh Sarmadi
- Esmail Soltanian
- Morteza Zarrabi
- Moharram Zaynalzadeh
