= KDK Factory =

- Industry: Media
- Founded: 2002
- Headquarters: Los Angeles, Delhi, Kabul
- Products: Motion pictures Video on demand Digital distribution Film Festival; Books; Multimedia
- Website: www.kdkfactory.com

KDK Factory is a film and television production and distribution company based in California. After producing a number of short films, it began producing and distributing feature-length documentaries such as 16 Days in Afghanistan and Mohsen Makhmalbaf's The Gardener.

The company mainly produces and distributes non-fiction content on a variety of issues, such as human rights, civil rights movement, women equality and universal education.

In 2009, the company produced a film about the life of Azim Khamisa, who chose to forgive his son's murderer, and the events that surrounded that true story. It was produced in association with the Tariq Khamisa Foundation.

In 2011, it produced a series of shorts and web spots for the Miracle Babies Foundation which was started by a doctor from the CNN Heros TV series.

In 2013, the company distributed Mohsen Makhmalbaf's feature film The Gardener theatrically in North America along with a number of other films via VOD.

In 2018, the company produced a virtual reality web series with Facebook as well as a mini-series on United Nations' Sustainable Development Goals.

Since its inception in 2012, KDK Factory has produced over 20 film and five multimedia projects.
