= The President (2014 film) =

2014 film by Mohsen Makhmalbaf

- Theatrical release poster
- Directed by: Mohsen Makhmalbaf
- Written by: Mohsen Makhmalbaf; Marziyeh Meshkiny
- Produced by: Vladimer Katcharava; Mike Downey; Sam Taylor; Maysam Makhmalbaf
- Starring: Misha Gomiashvili; Dachi Orvelashvili
- Cinematography: Konstantin Mindia Esadze
- Edited by: Hana Makhmalbaf; Marziyeh Meshkiny
- Production companies: 20 Steps Productions; President Fame Limited; Makhmalbaf Film House
- Release dates: 30 August 2014 (Venice Film Festival); 15 October 2014 (United States)
- Running time: 119 minutes
- Countries: Georgia; France; United Kingdom; Germany
- Language: Georgian

The President (Persian: پرزیدنت) is a film by Iranian director Mohsen Makhmalbaf following the themes of his previous film The Gardener.

The film had its world premiere at the 2014 Venice Film Festival, in the Horizons competition.

== Plot ==
A revolution is happening in a country with a dictatorial president. The president sends his family abroad but his grandson wants to stay with his grandfather. In order to save their lives they run away and the president uses a wig and a guitar to disguise himself as a gypsy. They want to reach the sea so they can go to another country by boat. They must experience poverty and hunger during their journey, and see the effects of the dictatorship on the country.

The inspiration for the film came when Makhmalbaf visited the Darul Aman Palace in Kabul and imagined how the Afghan rulers would have looked at the city and the people they ruled over. The Arab Spring revolutions were also inspirations.

== Festivals ==
- Venice International Film Festival, Italy, 2014 (Opening film)
- Busan International Film Festival, South Korea, 2014
- Beirut International Film Festival, Lebanon, 2014
- Chicago International Film Festival, USA, 2014
- London Film Festival, United Kingdom, 2014
- Warsaw International Film Festival, Poland, 2014
- Tokyo FILMeX International Film Festival, Japan, 2014
- International Film Festival Of India ( Goa), India, 2014 (Opening film)
- Tbilisi International Film Festival, Georgia, 2014 (Opening film)
- Carthage International Film Festival, Tunnis, 2014
- Tertio Millennio Film Festival, Italy, 2014 (Opening film)
- Inter National Film Festival of India (Kerala) 2014

== Awards ==
- Golden Hugo for the best film from Chicago International Film Festival, United States, 2014
- Audience Award for the Best Film from the 15th TOKYO FILMeX International Film Festival, Japan, 2014
- Société Générale Award for Best Feature Film by the audience vote from the 14th Beirut International Film Festival, Lebanon, 2014
