= Scream of the Ants =

- Promotional poster
- Directed by: Mohsen Makhmalbaf
- Written by: Mohsen Makhmalbaf
- Produced by: Mohsen Makhmalbaf
- Starring: Mamhoud Chokrollahi; Mahnour Shadzi
- Cinematography: Bakhshor
- Edited by: Mohsen Makhmalbaf
- Music by: Craig Pruess
- Production company: Makhmalbaf Film House
- Distributed by: Wild Bunch
- Release date: 2 September 2006 (Montreal World Film Festival)
- Running time: 89 minutes
- Countries: Iran; India; France
- Language: Persian

Scream of the Ants (Persian: Faryad-e-Morchegan) is a 2006 Iranian film directed by Mohsen Makhmalbaf and starring Mamhoud Chokrollahi and Mahnour Shadzi. The film was released to negative reviews.

== Plot ==
A newly wed Iranian couple (Mamhoud and Mahnour) go on a honeymoon on the river Ganges, in India and find a deeper meaning to their lives.

== Cast ==
- Mamhoud Chokrollahi as an atheist and communist husband
- Mahnour Shadzi as a believer wife who is searching for Ensan-e-Kamal (transl. the perfect human being) a.k.a. the Complete Man
- Yugi Sethu as the taxi driver
- Tenzin Choegyal as the Complete Man

== Production ==
Mohsen Makhmalbaf had wanted to make a film in India for fifteen years but was delayed by the country's "corruption and bureaucracy", according to the director. Shooting was finished in 2005.

== Release ==
The film received "its North American premiere at the 2006 Montreal World Film Festival."

== Reception ==
A critic from Variety wrote that "If irony there be, it remains inscrutably hidden among the idiocies. Even hardcore Makhmalbaf buffs may run screaming". Tim Brayton of Alternate Ending reviewing the film at the 43rd Chicago International Film Festival wrote that "Watching people realise that they have been making a series of grave mistakes can be interesting, and even watching people listening can be exciting in rare circumstances. But watching people listen to esoteric conversations about Indian religion and Indian poverty, and then watching them look at ironic juxtapositions of Indian religion and Indian poverty, that isn't really all that exciting". Assistant Professor Nick Davis of Northwestern University gave the film a C+ rating and wrote that "I wanted to scream several times during Scream of the Ants, sometimes for no better reason than the film's laziness and hectoring tone, but just as often for the same reasons that have pushed Makhmalbaf to this edge of his own outrage". Young film critic Mozhdeh Ghazanfari wrote that "Makhmalbaf is incapable of telling his story through a cinematic language. Instead, he sticks together a series of unrelated scenes in which different characters make political statements with no logical connections or cinematic arguments".

In the book Makhmalbaf at Large, Hamid Dibashi wrote that this film and Sex & Philosophy (2005) "are further indicies of his [Makhmalbaf's] tireless mind, his restless, creative soul, always at work in creating newer, visual experminatations". In the book Banal Transnationalism: On Mohsen Makhmalbaf's 'borderless' filmmaking, Shahab Esfandiary wrote that "Makhmalbaf's attitude towards India and its inhabitants in this film resembles the view of eighteenth century European anthropologist who is baffled by the (apparent) ignorance, barbarism and superstitious beliefs of the people of the Orient [...] reminiscent of the project of colonialism."
