= Time and Love =

Time and Love may refer to:

- Time & Love, a 1972 jazz album
- Time and Love: The Essential Masters, a 2000 compilation album
- Time and Love: The Music of Laura Nyro, a 1997 compilation album

== See also ==
- "Time Is Love", a 2012 song by Josh Turner
- Time of Love, a 1990 Iranian film
- Time to Love (disambiguation)
