= The Gardener (2012 film) =

- Theatrical release poster
- Directed by: Mohsen Makhmalbaf
- Produced by: Mohsen Makhmalbaf
- Starring: Ririva Eona Mabi; Paula Asadi; Guillaume Nyagatare; Tjireya Tjitendero Juzgado; Ian David Huang; Bal Kumari Gurung
- Cinematography: Maysam Makhmalbaf
- Edited by: Maysam Makhmalbaf
- Music by: Paul Colier; Salar Samadi
- Production company: Makhmalbaf Film House
- Distributed by: KDK Factory
- Release dates: October 2012 (Film festivals); August 2013 (Theatrical)
- Running time: 87 minutes
- Countries: United Kingdom; Israel
- Languages: English; Persian

The Gardener (Persian: باغبان, Bāghbān) is a documentary film by Mohsen Makhmalbaf. It had its Asian premiere at Busan International Film Festival, its European premiere at Rotterdam International Film Festival, and North American premiere at the Vancouver International Film Festival. It is the first film in decades to be made by an Iranian filmmaker in Israel. The film has been shown in more than 20 film festivals and won the Best Documentary award from Beirut International Film Festival and the special Maverick Award at the Motovun Film Festival in Croatia. The film was selected as "Critic's Pick of the Week" by New York Film Critics Circle, "Best of the Fest" at Busan Film Festival by The Hollywood Reporter, and "Top Ten Films" at Mumbai Film Festival by Times of India, and its script was added to the Library of Academy of Motion Picture Arts and Sciences.

== Synopsis ==
The film is about an Iranian filmmaker and his son who travel to Israel to learn about the role of religion in the world. While the son goes out to the Wailing Wall, the Dome of the Rock and Christian sites, the father stays at the Baháʼí gardens to learn about a faith that came out of his own country—Iran. The film is similar to Makhmalbaf's Gabbeh and The Silence in style.

The Gardener is set in the newly recognized UNESCO World Heritage Site, the Bahá'í World Centre buildings in Haifa and Western Galilee; and in various religious sites in Jerusalem.

== Cast and crew ==
Producers:

- Screenplay and director: Mohsen Makhmalbaf
- Cinematography and editing: Maysam Makhmalbaf
- Music: Paul Collier, Salar Samadi
- Sound: Asad Rezai

Cast:

- Ririva Eona Mabi from Papua New Guinea
- Paula Asadi from Canada
- Guillaume Nyagatare from Rwanda
- Tjireya Tjitendero Juzgado from Angola
- Ian Huang from Taiwan and USA
- Bal Kumari Gurung from Nepal

== Filming locations ==
- Baha'i Gardens in Haifa
- Dome of the Rock in Jerusalem
- Wailing Wall in Jerusalem
- Chapel of the Ascension in Jerusalem
- Baháʼí holy places in Akko
- Various cities in Papua New Guinea

== Reviews ==
The Gardener has received mostly positive reviews by all critics and holds an 83% rating on Rotten Tomatoes and 64 score on Metacritic.

New York Times: "An intimate, discursive inquiry into religious belief that opens to include questions about cinema…Mr. Makhmalbaf doesn’t make that etymological connection explicit in the movie, although as he rambles throughout the Baha’i gardens, his camera inching antlike close to the ground and then soaring birdlike over the grounds, he lyrically joins the spiritual with the terrestrial."

The Hollywood Reporter: "The Gardener marks the first time in decades—perhaps since the Iranian Revolution in 1979—that an Iranian filmmaker has shot a movie in Israel, and what it has to say about religion and world peace is as radical a statement as unconventional filmmaker Mohsen Makhmalbaf (The Bicyclist, Kandahar) has ever made...The deep spirituality it discusses so intelligently will appeal to open-minded viewers and should reach beyond festivals via culture channels..." - Deborah Young, The Hollywood Reporter

Variety: "With their civilized discussion and amusing asides about the making and marketing of docus, the Makhmalbafs succeed in entertaining and engaging auds who are interested in the question of why people seek religion, and are willing to listen to all sides of a story." - Richard Kuipers, Variety (magazine)

Rotterdam Festival Review: "An Iranian master filmmaker and his son roamed around the gardens in Haifa and made their most striking film...Mohsen Makhmalbaf makes unusual films, and this may be his most unusual of all: an Iranian who makes a film in Israel - even those who don't follow the news will realise how usual that is...This is indirectly a story about the history of Iran, where an innocent ‘gardener's faith’ could not remain, and where Makhmalbaf, once a proponent of the Islamic Revolution, is also no longer able to make his films."

Times of India: "Exiled from his homeland, Iranian New Wave director Mohsen Makhmalbaf's film The Gardener explores how different generations view religion and peace. The film adopts an experimental approach of both father and son conversing while filming each other." -The Times of India

Iranian Icons: "This film shows two completely different views on the religion. The director camera tries to portrait the example of two different generation of Iran through this story." - Iranian Icon

Voice of Russia "This film speculates the meaning of life and faith." - Swetlana Hochrjakowa, film critic (translated from Russian)

The International Federation of Film Critics "...the most radiant imagery in a Makhmalbaf film since the bright carpets of the nomadic Ghashghai people in the 1996 Gabbeh. It's God in Heaven meets 1950s MGM Technicolor: beauty, beauty, beauty. What Adam and Eve saw before Eve bit into the apple." - Gerald Peary

The Hindu: "The grammar and discourse of this unusual film — driven by a search for peace and understanding — is simultaneously rational, intelligent, poetic, and above all intensely civilised."

== Impact ==
There are several controversies surrounding the film. BBC notes that this is Makhmalbaf's most controversial film to date.

=== Iranian media response ===
Both official and non-official Iranian media has been following and reporting on the story since Makhmalbaf first announced the film. Local newspapers accused him of selling out to the Baha'is and/or the western powers, and claimed that Baha'is had bought him a house in France.

=== Travel to Israel ===
Iranians are not allowed to travel to Israel and thus Makhmalbaf and his Iranian crew will be automatically sentenced to five years in prison should they ever return to Iran. The filmmaker also talks about a religion that is a taboo subject in Iran and has its own consequences, such as that received by Shirin Ebadi for taking up the case of this group.

In addition, Mohsen's decision to present the film at the Jerusalem Film Festival in contravention of the BDS campaign caused some controversy. An open letter published on Jadaliyya urging him not to attend was signed by many prominent Iranians, including Arash Bineshpajouh, Tina Gharavi, Ziba Mir-Hosseini, Laleh Khalili, Hamid Dabashi, Fatemeh Keshavarz, Ervand Abrahamian, and Asef Bayat. The letter was also critical of Iran's state-sponsored oppression of the Baha’i community.

A group of 250 social and cultural activists signed a letter to support him. Many Israelis appreciated that he came and presented his film. Adrina Hoffman of The Nation wrote that what shocked everyone was that he kept saying "I love you." The film sold out for its initial screenings and other screenings were scheduled after the festival. Makhmalbaf responded on BBC, saying that boycotts do not change people's hearts, and dialog is a better way of understanding each other.

=== Removal from Iranian Cinema Museum ===
The president of the Iranian film department sent a letter to the head of the Iranian film museum to remove all of Makhmalbaf's films from the museum's archives because he has travelled to Israel and made a film about a taboo religion.

Due to the treatment Makhmalbaf has received because of traveling to Israel to make the film, Oscar-winner Asghar Farhadi and many other filmmakers are wary of giving their awards to the Iranian Cinema Museum in fear of meeting the same fate.

== Screenings and awards ==
=== Awards ===
- Asia Pacific Awards, Competition Finalist
- Academy Awards, Considered
- Top Ten Films of 2012 Mumbai International Film Festival – by Times of India
- "Pick of the Week" by New York Film Critics Circle
- Beirut International Film Festival, Lebanon, October 2012 – Won Gold Aleph for Best Documentary
- Motovan International Film Festival, Croatia, 2013 – Won Maverick Award

=== Premieres & special presentations ===
- Busan International Film Festival, Korea, October 2012 – World premiere
- Rotterdam International Film Festival, Netherlands, 2013 – European premiere
- Kosmorama International Film Festival, Norway, April 2013 – Lifetime Honoree Award
- Moscow International Film Festival, Russia, 2013 – Makhmalbaf as president of the jury, Special Presentation

Official Selections

- Vancouver International Film Festival, October 2013
- Noor Iranian Film Festival, Best Documentary nominee, Los Angeles 2013
- Art Center Festival, Colombia, 2013
- Jerusalem International Film Festival, Israel, 2013
- Motovun International Film Festival, Croatia, 2013
- Festival Cinema Africano, Italy, May 2013
- Vilnius International Film Festival, Lithuania, April 2013
- Hong Kong International Film Festival, March, 2013
- Tbilisi International Film Festival, Georgia, December 2012
- Trivandrum International Film Festival, India, December 2012
- Chennai International Film Festival, India, December 2012
- Kochi International Film Festival, India, December 2012
- Tokyo filmex International Film Festival, Japan, November 2012
- Mumbai International Film Festival, India, October 2012
