= Ardalan Shoja Kaveh =

Iranian actor

Ardalan Shoja Kaveh (Persian: اردلان شجاع‌کاوه; born 1963 in Birjand, Iran), is an Iranian actor. He worked with Mohsen Makhmalbaf in the film Boycott (originally Baykot). Shoja Kaveh is also a famous television actor and has starred in various sitcoms such as Char Khooneh, a successful Iranian comedy.

== Theater ==
The Chant of Gabriel's Wing, Actor, director: Mohsen Moeini, Andisheh Hall, 2015

== Sources ==
- Resalat. Kaveh Ardalan: Brave, strong actor in theater, cinema and television. Issue No. 5870, p. 5. (in Persian; English machine translation)
- Tehran Times. Donya-ye Tasvir celebration returns with awards for “Night Bus”, “Song of Sparrows”. March 7, 2010
