= Nights of Zayandeh Rood =

- Directed by: Mohsen Makhmalbaf
- Cinematography: Alireza Zarrindast
- Release date: 1990
- Country: Iran
- Language: Persian
- Box office: $3,536

Nights of Zayandeh Rood (Persian: شب های زاینده رود) is an Iranian film written and directed by Mohsen Makhmalbaf. It was released, censored and banned in 1990–1991, it wasn't shown for 26 years until 2016 Venice Film Festival. It is named after the Zayande Rood river in Isfahan, Iran.

37 Minutes of the film was censored.

== Plot ==
The story is about the life of a sociology university lecturer and his daughter pre-revolution, during the revolution and after it.

== Cast ==
- Manochehr Esmaeeli
- Mozhgan Naderi
- Parvaneh Gowharani
- Zeinab Rahdari
- Mehrdad Farid
- Mohsen Ghasemi
- Afsaneh Heidariyan
- Nahid Rashidi
- Maryam Naghib

== Soundtrack ==
Two of the songs used in the film are one song by Hossein Khajeh Amiri and one song by Alireza Eftekhari.

== Awards ==
- 9th Fajr Film Festival nominated for best screenplay and sound capture
