= Marghe and Her Mother =

2019 film by Mohsen Makhmalbaf

- Italian: Marghe e sua madre
- Directed by: Mohsen Makhmalbaf
- Written by: Marziyeh Meshkiny, Mohsen Makhmalbaf
- Produced by: Maysam Makhmalbaf; Rocco Calandriello; Claudia D'Anna
- Starring: Ylenia Galtieri; Margherita Pantaleo; Raffaella Gallo; Paolo C. Santeramo; Danilo Acinapura
- Cinematography: Maysam Makhmalbaf
- Edited by: Flavio Russo
- Music by: Farid Pirayesh
- Production company: Makhmalbaf Film House
- Distributed by: Makhmalbaf Film House (UK); Allelammie (Italy); Rai Cinema (Italy)
- Release date: 27 September 2019
- Running time: 101 minutes
- Country: Italy
- Language: Italian

Marghe and Her Mother (Italian: Marghe e sua madre) is a 2019 British-Italian-Iranian drama film written and directed by Mohsen Makhmalbaf. Starring Ylenia Galtieri, Margherita Pantaleo and Raffaella Gallo.

== Plot ==
In Italy, Claudia is a young single mother who lives with her daughter named Marghe, a six-year-old precocious girl. When Claudia is kicked out of her home for not being able to pay the rent, she leaves Marghe to a neighbour, while she goes to search for new opportunities of employment and love.

== Cast ==
- Ylenia Galtieri as Claudia
- Margherita Pantaleo as Marghe
- Paolo C. Santeramo as Alessandro
- Raffaella Gallo as Giulia
- Danilo Acinapura as Alberto

== Release ==
The film had its premiere at 24th Busan International Film Festival in October 2019, as "Icon" at the festival. It is also selected as the closing film of the 50th International Film Festival of India to be screened on 2019.

== Reception ==
=== Accolades ===
| Year | Award | Category | Nominated | Result |
|---|---|---|---|---|
| 2019 | Bosphorus Film Festival | Best Film - International Competition | Mohsen Makhmalbaf | Nominated |
| 2019 | Hainan International Film Festival | Best Feature Film | Mohsen Makhmalbaf | Nominated |
| 2020 | Scandinavian International Film Festival | Best Actress | Ylenia Galtieri | Won |
| 2020 | Scandinavian International Film Festival | Best Feature Film | Mohsen Makhmalbaf | Won |
| 2020 | WorldFest Houston | Best Film | Mohsen Makhmalbaf and Makhmalbaf Film House | Won |
| 2020 | WorldFest Houston | Best Actress | Margherita Pantaleo | Nominated |
