= Once Upon a Time, Cinema =

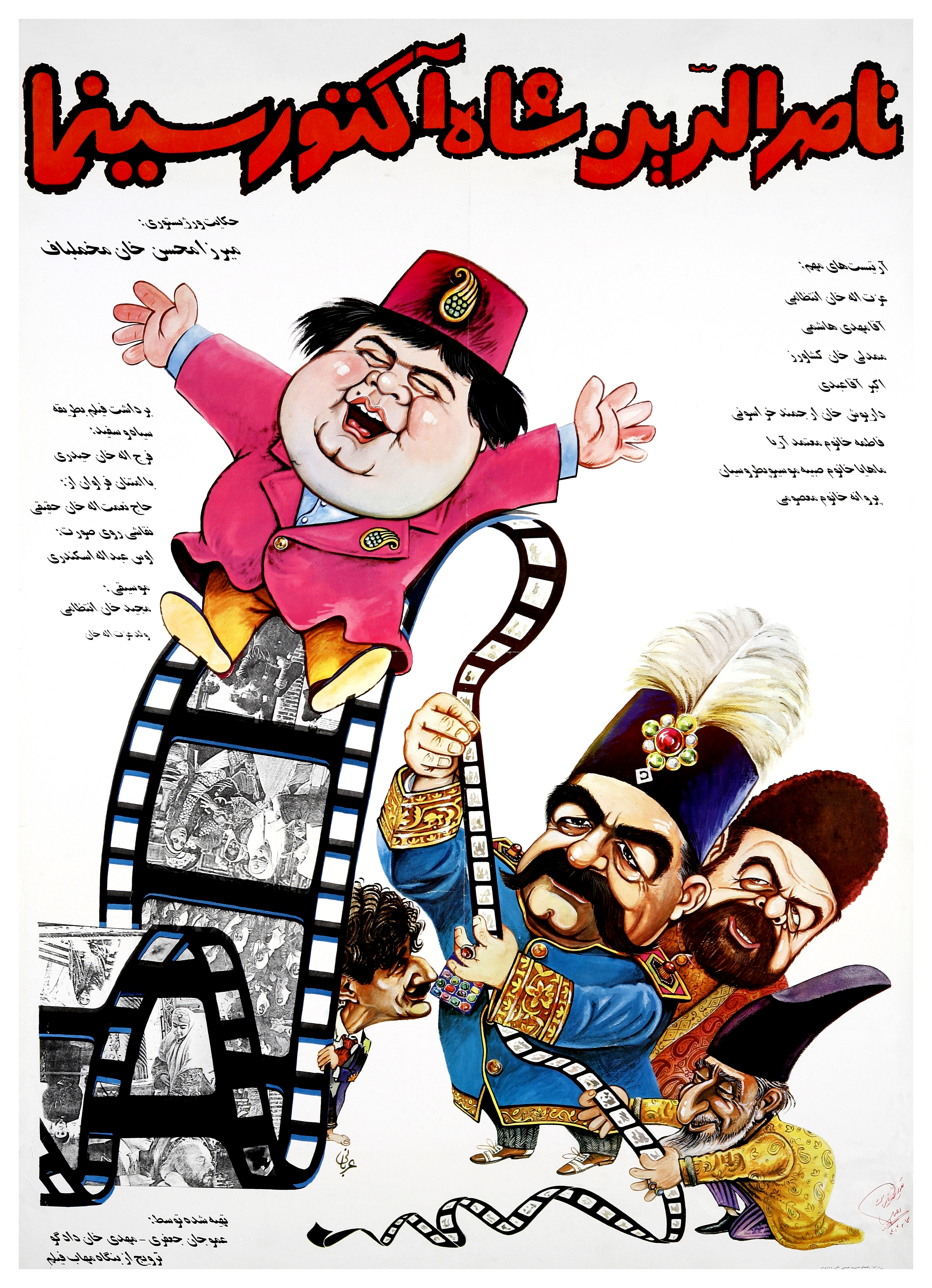
- Naser al-din Shah, Actor of Cinema ناصرالدین‌شاه آکتور سینما
- Directed by: Mohsen Makhmalbaf
- Written by: Mohsen Makhmalbaf
- Produced by: Mohammad Mehdi Dadgo
- Starring: Ezzatolah Entezami; Mehdi Hashemi; Akbar Abdi; Mohammad-Ali Keshavarz; Fatemeh Motamed-Arya
- Cinematography: Nemat Haghighi; Faraj Heidari
- Edited by: Mohsen Makhmalbaf
- Music by: Majid Entezami
- Production company: Jozan Film
- Distributed by: Facets Multimedia Distribution
- Release date: February 1, 1992
- Running time: 92 minutes
- Country: Iran
- Language: Persian

Once Upon a Time, Cinema (Persian: ناصرالدین‌شاه آکتور سینما, lit. 'Naser al-din Shah, Actor of Cinema') is a 1992 Iranian fantasy comedy film, written and directed by Mohsen Makhmalbaf.

The film includes clips from old Iranian films from the silent age onwards. Made in black-and-white (with a brief colour sequence), it parodies many of the conventions of silent slapstick comedy and early fantasy films.

== Plot ==
The film follows a character known as The Cinematographer (Mehdi Hashemi), who is looking for someone called Atieh (Future). As he calls out to her, he is magically transported back in time from the early twentieth century to the reign of Naser al-Din Shah in 19th century Iran. Captured by the Shah's guards, he shows films from the (future) history of Iranian cinema to the Shah (Ezzatolah Entezami). The Shah is entranced and eagerly shows his family the apparently magical medium.

While watching the film Lor Girl (1932), a melodrama about feisty girl attacked by bandits, the Shah becomes enamoured of the heroine, Golnar. Golnar (Fatemeh Motamed-Aria) then drops out of the film into the "real" world of the Shah's court. The Shah has his soldiers take her to his harem to become one of his many wives. Transported to the Shah by being sent down his harem slide, Golnar rejects him and attempts to escape, leading to a slapstick chase-scene.

Meanwhile, the cinematographer is showing films to the Shah's wives. The Shah himself wants everyone to see Lor Girl. There is a big open-air showing. Other films are also shown, notably the vigilante revenge drama Qeysar (1969). The vigilante hero comes out of the film. The Shah talks to him about using him against his enemies and confesses that his one true love in the harem was killed by his other jealous wives. Now he only dreams of Golnar. Meanwhile, disturbed by the disruptive power of cinema, the Shah's advisors meet to discuss how to censor this dangerous medium.

The Shah asks the cinematographer to turn him into Jafar, the hero of Lor Girl, to win Golnar's love. The cinematographer uses his cinema magic on him but instead turns the Shah into the protagonist of The Cow (1969), a film about a man believes he is a cow. He then instructs him to pull a plough to help a poor family. The cinematographer is arrested and condemned for insulting the Shah. As he is about to be executed, the full power of cinema is unleashed, blowing the court away. The film moves into colour, ending in a series of clips of people embracing.

== Cast ==
- Ezzatolah Entezami as Naser al-Din Shah Qajar
- Mehdi Hashemi
- Akbar Abdi
- Mohammad-Ali Keshavarz
- Fatemeh Motamed-Arya

== Accolades and interpretations ==
Naser-ed-din Shah won two Special Jury Prizes from the Istanbul International Film Festival and the Karlovy Vary International Film Festival.

Makhmalbaf later said that the film formed the first part of a trilogy about cinema and society. Once Upon a Time, Cinema dealt with cinema and political power. Of later films in the trilogy, Hello Cinema and The Actor, the first dealt with cinema and the people, the second with cinema and the artist.
