= Boycott (1985 film) =

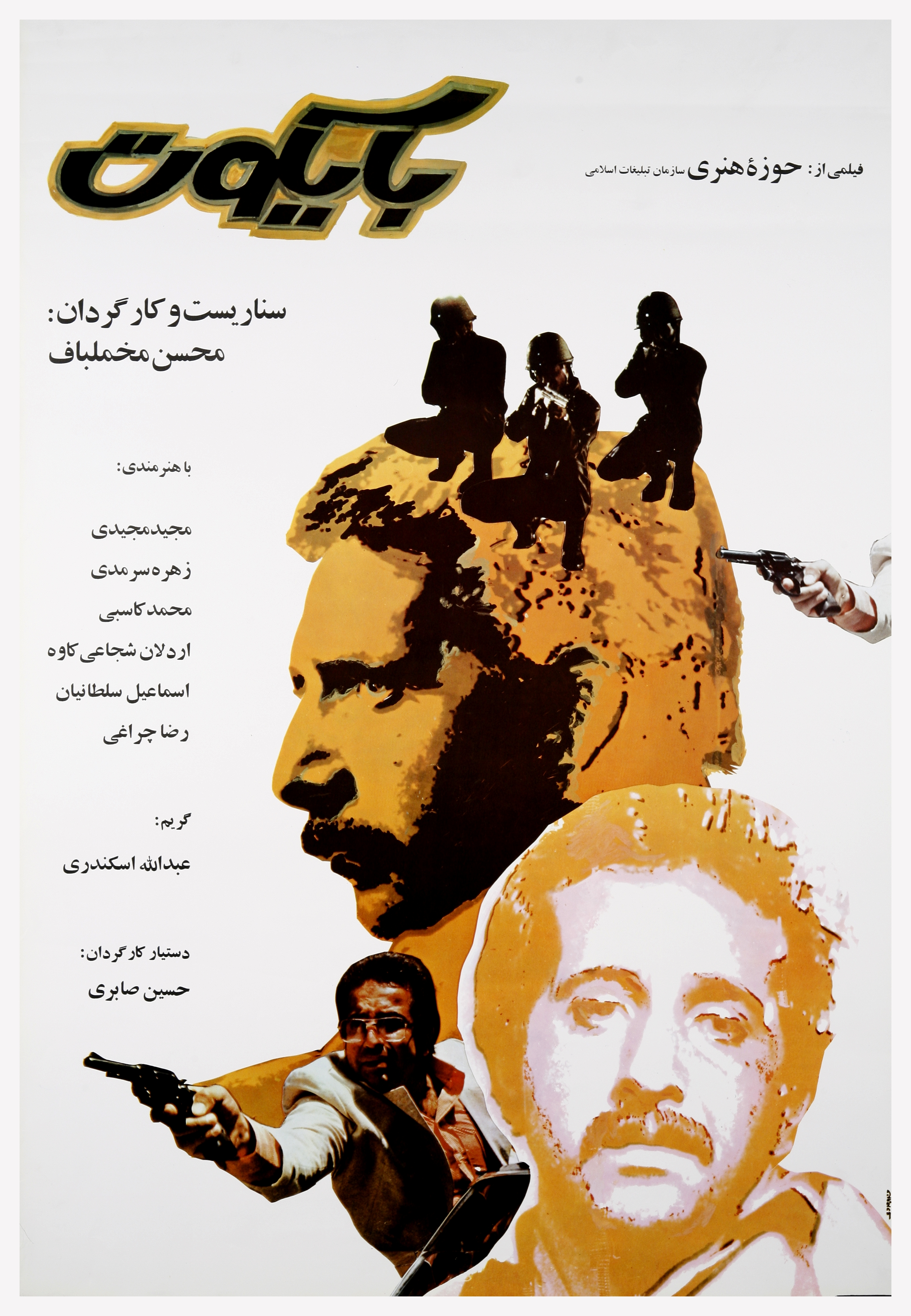
- Directed by: Mohsen Makhmalbaf
- Written by: Mohsen Makhmalbaf
- Starring: Majid Majidi
- Cinematography: Mohsen Makhmalbaf; Faraj Heidari
- Edited by: Mohsen Makhmalbaf; Rubik Mansuri
- Release date: 1985
- Running time: 114 minutes
- Country: Iran
- Language: Persian

Boycott (Persian: بایکوت, romanized: Baykot) is a 1985 Iranian film directed by Mohsen Makhmalbaf, set in pre-revolutionary Iran. The film tells the story of a young man named Valeh (Majid Majidi) who is sentenced to death for his communist tendencies. It is widely believed that the film is based on Makhmalbaf's own experiences. Ardalan Shoja Kaveh starred in the film.

== Cast ==
- Mohamad Kasebi
- Majid Majidi as Valeh
- Esmat Makhmalbaf as Nurse
- Zohreh Sarmadi as Maryam (Valeh's Wife)
- Ardalan Shoja Kaveh as Ali
- Esmail Soltanian
