= Close-Up (1990 film) =

1990 film by Abbas Kiarostami

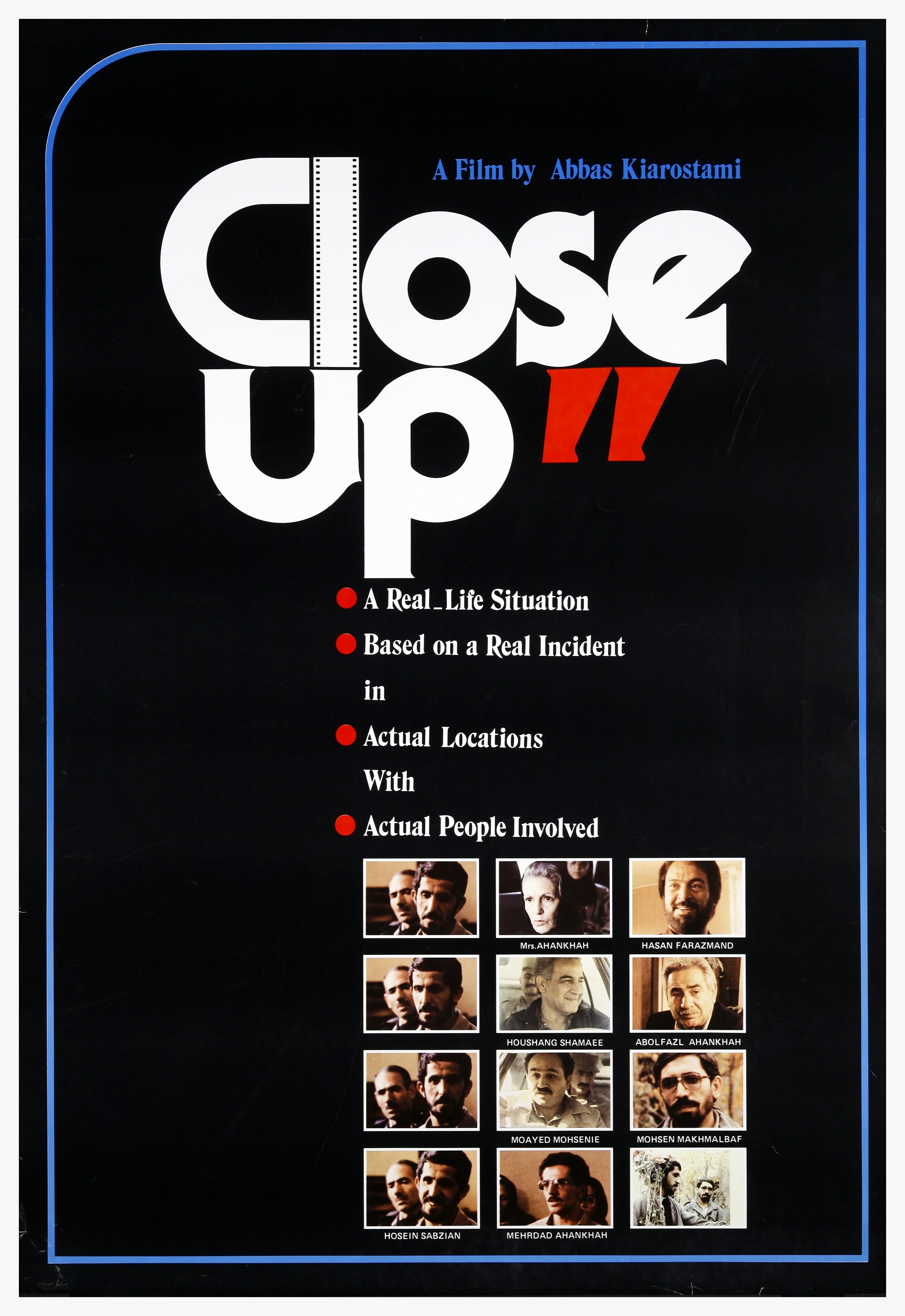
- Film poster
- کلوزآپ ، نمای نزدیک
- Directed by: Abbas Kiarostami
- Written by: Abbas Kiarostami
- Produced by: Ali Reza Zarrin
- Starring: Hossain Sabzian; Mohsen Makhmalbaf
- Cinematography: Ali Reza Zarrindast
- Edited by: Abbas Kiarostami
- Production company: Kanoon
- Distributed by: Celluloid Dreams
- Release date: 1990
- Running time: 98 minutes
- Country: Iran
- Language: Persian

Close Up (1990)

Close-Up (Persian: کلوزآپ ، نمای نزدیک, Klūzāp, nemā-ye nazdīk) is a 1990 Iranian docufiction written, directed and edited by Abbas Kiarostami. The film tells the story of Hossein Sabzian, a man who impersonated film-maker Mohsen Makhmalbaf and conned a family into believing they would star in his new film. The director received permission to film the historic trial; with their agreement, he featured the people involved in re-enacting certain events that had preceded that. All "play" themselves. Through this work about human identity, Kiarostami gained wider international recognition.

Close-Up is considered to be one of the greatest films of all time; in the 2012 Sight & Sound poll, it was voted by critics as one of "The Top 50 Greatest Films of All Time". In the 2022 Sight and Sound critics' poll, it was rated the 17th greatest film of all time.

== Plot ==
Impoverished print shop worker and cinephile Hossain Sabzian is riding a bus with a copy of the published screenplay of The Cyclist by Mohsen Makhmalbaf, an acclaimed director he admires. A woman sitting next to him, Mrs. Ahankhah, reveals that she is a fan of the film and her sons are interested in cinema. Sabzian declares himself Makhmalbaf, gifts the woman the screenplay, and obtains her contact information.

Posing as Makhmalbaf, Sabzian visits the Ahankhah family several times over the next two weeks. He flatters them by suggesting that their house be used for his next film and their sons as actors. He also borrows 1,900 tomans from one of the sons for cab fare. The father, Mr. Ahankhah, starts to suspect that he is an imposter trying to rob them, particularly after the supposed director appears unaware that he had recently won an award at an Italian festival. Journalist Hossain Farazmand is invited to the house, where he confirms that Sabzian is indeed an impostor. The police arrest Sabzian, and Farazmand takes several pictures for his upcoming article for the magazine Sorush, to be titled "Bogus Makhmalbaf Arrested".

Kiarostami visits Sabzian in prison and helps advance the date of his trial, in addition to securing permission from the judge to film the proceedings. At Sabzian's trial on charges of fraud and attempted fraud, he states that he posed as Makhmalbaf out of his deep love for the man's film and cinema as art, and that he feels seen in his own suffering through these films. Ahankhah's son recounts Sabzian's visits as the family's suspicions grew. Given that Sabzian is a young father with no prior record and expresses remorse for his actions, the judge asks the family if they would be willing to pardon Sabzian, allowing for a reduction of his sentence. They agree in exchange for Sabzian's commitment to become a productive member of society.

Upon Sabzian's release, he is surprised by the real Makhmalbaf and given a ride to the Ahankhahs' house, stopping to purchase flowers. He smiles when Mr. Ahankhah says of him, "I hope he'll be good now and make us proud of him."

== Cast ==
- Hossain Sabzian as himself
- Mohsen Makhmalbaf as himself
- Abbas Kiarostami as himself
- Abolfazl Ahankhah as himself
- Mehrdad Ahankhah as himself
- Monoochehr Ahankhah as himself
- Mahrokh Ahankhah as herself
- Haj Ali Reza Ahmadi as himself, the Judge
- Nayer Mohseni Zonoozi as herself
- Ahmad Reza Moayed Mohseni as himself, a family friend
- Hossain Farazmand as himself, a reporter
- Hooshang Shamaei as himself, a Taxi Driver
- Mohammad Ali Barrati as himself, a Soldier
- Davood Goodarzi as himself, a Sergeant
- Hassan Komaili as himself, a Court Recorder
- Davood Mohabbat as himself, a Court Recorder

== Production ==
Close-Up is based on actual events that occurred in Northern Tehran in the late 1980s. Kiarostami first heard about Sabzian in 1989 after reading about the incident in an article in the Iranian magazine Sorush by journalist Hassan Farazmand. Kiarostami immediately suspended work on the film project for which he was in pre-production.

Taken by the figure of the impostor, he began making a documentary on Sabzian. Kiarostami was allowed to film Sabzian's trial. He gained the agreement of Sabzian, the Ahankhahs, and journalist Farazmand to participate in the film and to re-enact past incidents. Kiarostami also arranged for director Mohsen Makhmalbaf to meet Sabzian and help facilitate the Ahankhah family's pardon for Sabzian.

== Critical reception ==
When the film opened in Iran, reviews were almost uniformly negative. The film gained its first appreciation abroad. The New York Times film critic Stephen Holden called the film "brilliant", noting its "radically drab cinema-verite style that helps blur any difference between what is real and what is reconstructed."

In 2010 Los Angeles Times critic Dennis Lim described the film as eloquent and direct, saying that it provided "a window into the psyche of a complicated man and into the social and cultural reality of Iran." In 2022, the film was ranked in 17th place in the Sight and Sound's critics' poll of The Greatest Films of All Time, published by the British Film Institute. In the Sight and Sound director's poll, Close-Up was ranked in 9th place, tying with Persona and In the Mood for Love.

On the review aggregator website Rotten Tomatoes, 89% of 19 critics' reviews are positive, with an average rating of 8.5/10. Metacritic, which uses a weighted average, assigned the film a score of 92 out of 100, based on 15 critics, indicating "universal acclaim".

== Influence ==
Five years after Close-Up, Moslem Mansouri and Mahmoud Chokrollahi wrote and directed the documentary Close-Up Long Shot (Persian: کلوزآپ نمای دور, Klūzāp nemā-ye dūr). It features Sabzian talking about his infatuation with cinema, his impersonation of Makhmalbaf, and how his life has changed since working with Kiarostami. The film premiered at Turin's 14th Festival Internazionale Cinema Giovani in November 1996, where it won the FIPRESCI Prize – Special Mention.

Nanni Moretti's Italian short film Opening Day of Close-Up (1996) follows a theater owner as he prepares to show Kiarostami's film at his independent cinema.

In an interview for the Criterion edition of the 2019 film Rolling Thunder Revue, director Martin Scorsese cited Kiarostami as his main influence.

In 2012, filmmaker Ashim Ahluwalia included the film in his personal top ten (for The Sight & Sound Top 50 Greatest Films of All Time poll), writing: "A re-enactment of a re-enactment of a re-enactment, Close Up essentially destroys the very conception of a 'documentary' and yet is one of the best ever made."

== Aftermath ==
In 2006, Hossain Sabzian died at age 52 after a heart attack. He experienced respiratory failure on the Tehran metro in August, slipped into a coma, and died on September 29.

== Awards ==
- 1990: Montreal International Festival of New Cinema and Video: Quebec Film Critics Award
- 1992: International Istanbul Film Festival: FIPRESCI Prize

== See also ==
- F for Fake (1973) – the last major film completed by Orson Welles, who directed, co-wrote, and starred in the film. It is loosely classified as a documentary and spans several different genres. It has been described as a kind of film essay.
- Hello Cinema (1995) – an Iranian docufiction film directed by Mohsen Makhmalbaf showing various everyday people being auditioned and explaining their reasons for wanting to act in a film.
- Colour Me Kubrick (2005) – a British film directed by Brian W. Cook that is the true story of a man who pretended to be director Stanley Kubrick, a similar premise to this film.
- List of docufiction films
- Metafilm

== Bibliography ==
- Godfrey Cheshire, "Confessions of a Sin-ephile: 'Close Up'", Cinema Scope, no. 2 (Winter 2000), pp. 3–8
- Cristina Vatulescu, "'The Face to Face Encounter of Art and Law': Abbas Kiarostami's Close-Up," Law and Literature, vol. 23, no. 2 (Summer 2011), pp. 173–194
