= Seifollah Dad =

Iranian screenwriter and film director

- سیف‌الله داد
- Born: 2 October 1955; Khorramshahr, Iran
- Died: 29 August 2009 (aged 53); Tehran, Iran

Seifollah Dad (Persian: سیف‌الله داد; 2 October 1955 – 29 August 2009) was an Iranian screenwriter and director. He was born in Khurramshahr and studied sociology at Shiraz University. He made his directorial debut with Under the Rain in 1985, and his second film Kani-Manga won the Crystal Simorgh for best film. He also edited a number of Iranian films in the 1980s and 1990s. His third and final feature The Survivor was released in 1995. He died in Tehran in 2009.
