= Kani-Manga =

1987 Iranian war movie

Kanimanga is an Iranian war movie directed by Seifollah Dad, originally released in 1987. The film was shown in theatres for 15 years, the longest run in Iranian cinema history.

== Awards ==
(Fajr Film Festival) In 1987 Kanimanga was awarded 2 Crystal Simorghs for Best Editing (Ruhollah Emami) and Best Special Effects (Mohammad Reza Shafaruddin). The film also received the Special Jury Award.

In addition, Ali Sabetfar was nominated for best supporting actor.

== Plot ==
An Iraqi plane crashes in the Kani Manga area Iraqi Kurdistan. The pilot survives and escapes. Captain Yavari assigns a group of commandos to capture the pilot.

One of the armed Kurdish groups opposed to the Islamic Republic, led by "Kak Houshang", enters the campaign to rescue the pilot.

The commandos clash with members of the armed group and capture the Iraqi pilot. Iraqi helicopters are dispatched to the area to counter the attack, and they begin an aerial battle with Iranian helicopters.

The conflict ends in favor of the Iranian forces, and before his death, Houshang confesses that he killed Yavari's brother, his longtime friend, because he refused to cooperate with his group.

== See also ==
- 65th Airborne Special Forces Brigade
