= The Cyclist =

1987 film by Mohsen Makhmalbaf

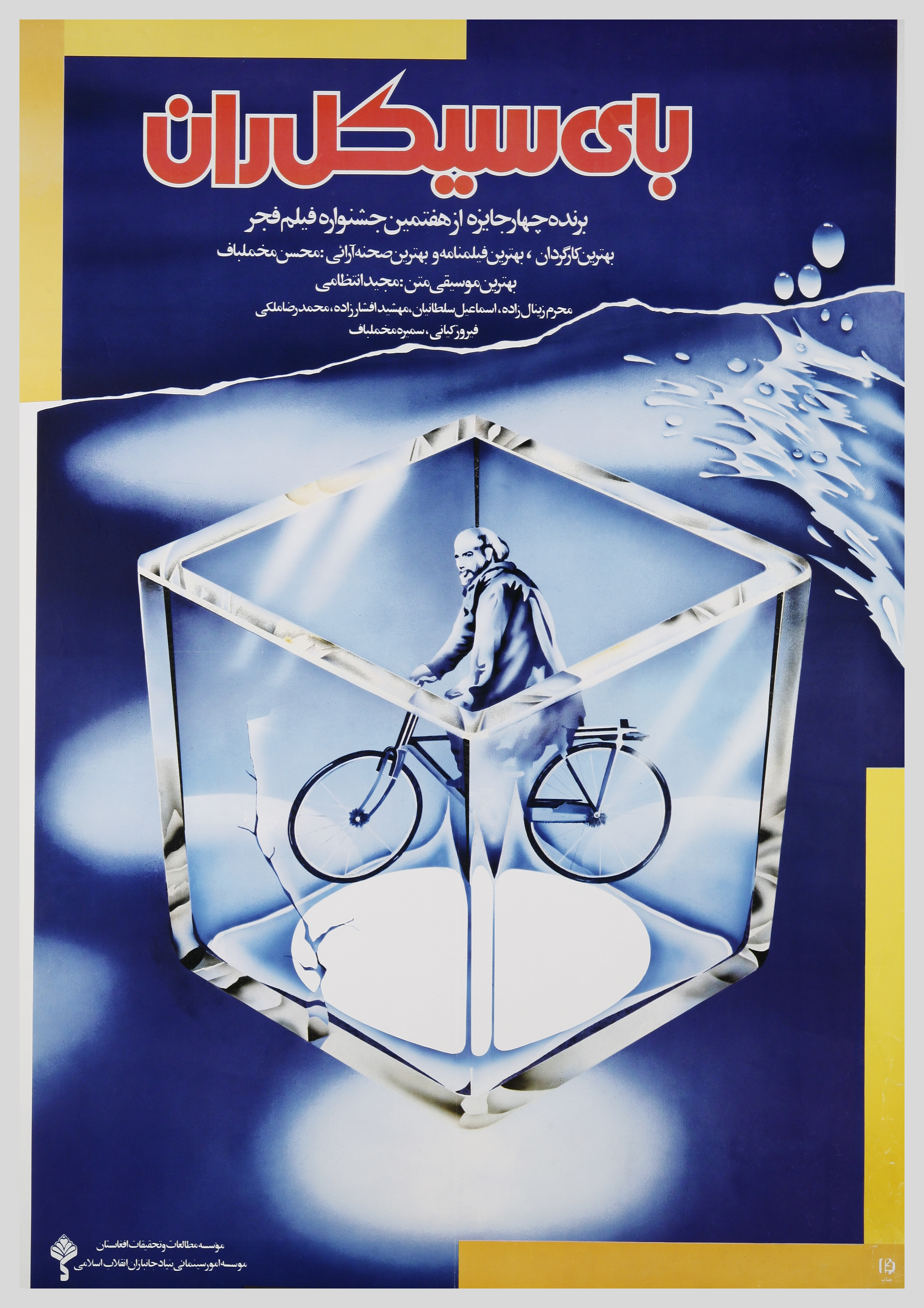
- Directed by: Mohsen Makhmalbaf
- Written by: Mohsen Makhmalbaf
- Cinematography: Ali Reza Zarrindast
- Edited by: Mohsen Makhmalbaf
- Music by: Majid Entezami
- Production company: Bonyad Mostazafan
- Distributed by: Filmarti; Cinéma Public Films; Facets Multimedia Distribution; Kino Video
- Release date: 1987
- Running time: 82 minutes
- Country: Iran
- Language: Persian

The Cyclist (Persian: بايسيكل‌ران, romanized: Bicycleran) is a 1987 Iranian sports-drama film written and directed by Mohsen Makhmalbaf, starring Moharram Zaynalzadeh as Abu Ahmed.

== Plot ==
Full movie

Nasim, a poor Afghan refugee in Iran, gives a demonstration in his town's square, during which he rides his bicycle without stopping for seven days and seven nights, with the aim of raising money to pay for life-saving surgery for his dying wife. In the end, even after seven days, he continues to pedal endlessly, too fatigued to hear his son's and the crowd's pleas to get off his bicycle. One scholar analyses the film as an allegory which depicts the exploitation that Afghan refugees suffer from in Iran and from which they are unable to escape.

== Accolades ==
In 1991 the film won the best narrative film award in the Hawaii International Film Festival.

== See also ==
- List of films about bicycles and cycling
