= The Marriage of the Blessed =

- Directed by: Mohsen Makhmalbaf
- Written by: Mohsen Makhmalbaf
- Produced by: Karim Zargar
- Cinematography: Ali Reza Zarrindast
- Edited by: Mohsen Makhmalbaf
- Music by: Babak Bayat
- Production company: Open City Entertainment
- Distributed by: Facets Multimedia Distribution
- Release date: 1988
- Running time: 76 minutes
- Country: Iran
- Language: Persia

Marriage of the Blessed (Persian: عروسی خوبان, romanized: Arousi-ye khouban) is a 1988 Iranian film directed by Mohsen Makhmalbaf about Haji, a young soldier of the Iran–Iraq War, and his inability to adapt to civilian life after his release from the hospital.
