= The Afghan Alphabet =

- Directed by: Mohsen Makhmalbaf
- Music by: Mohammad Reza Darvishi
- Release date: 2002
- Country: Iran

The Afghan Alphabet (Persian: الفبای افغان, romanized: Alefbay-e afghan) is a 2002 documentary by Mohsen Makhmalbaf showing the life of children in the Afghan villages bordering Iran, and how their life and culture were affected by the Taliban regime, that had at the time just been ousted in a US-led multilateral military operation.

== Importance ==
In 2002 about 3 million Afghan refugees were living in Iran. From those about 700,000 were Afghan children who were not allowed to go to Iranian schools because of their illegal status in Iran. After this movie was made, this subject became controversial and finally the Islamic Consultative Assembly passed a bill to allow Afghani children to go to school and it resulted in 500,000 kids getting education.

== Awards & Festival Screenings ==
- Best Film Award from Document ART International Film Festival, (Germany) 2002
- Fajr International Film Festival, Iran 2002
- Gotteburg 2003
- Rio 2003
- Busan International Film Festival 2003
- Hong Kong 2003
- Greece 6 March 2002 (Thessaloniki Documentary Festival)
- USA 6 April 2002 (DoubleTake Documentary Film Festival)
- USA 2 June 2002 (Seattle International Film Festival)
- Canada 1 September 2002 (Montreal World Film Festival)
- Japan 7 September 2002 (Tokyo)
- USA 4 October 2002 (Chicago International Film Festival)
- South Korea 18 November 2002 (Pusan International Film Festival)
- Singapore 3 May 2003 (Singapore International Film Festival)
- Hungary 4 October 2006 (TV premiere)
