= A Moment of Innocence =

- Theatrical release poster
- Directed by: Mohsen Makhmalbaf
- Written by: Mohsen Makhmalbaf
- Produced by: Abolfazi Alagheband
- Starring: Mirhadi Tayebi; Mohsen Makhmalbaf; Ali Bakhsi
- Cinematography: Mahmoud Kalari
- Edited by: Mohsen Makhmalbaf
- Music by: Madjid Entezami
- Production companies: MK2 Productions; Makhmalbaf Productions
- Distributed by: NFM Distributie
- Release dates: 13 August 1996 (Locarno Film Festival); 9 April 1997 (France)
- Running time: 78 minutes
- Countries: Iran; France
- Language: Persian
- Box office: $37,598 (US and Canada)

A Moment of Innocence (Persian: نون و گلدون, romanized: Nūn o Goldūn) is a 1996 comedy-drama film directed by Mohsen Makhmalbaf. It is also known as Nun va Goldoon, Bread and Flower, Bread and Flower Pot, and The Bread and the Vase.

== Plot ==
The film is a semi-autobiographical and metafictional account of Makhmalbaf's experience as a teenager when, as a seventeen-year-old, he stabbed a policeman at a protest rally and was jailed.

Two decades later, Makhmalbaf made the decision to track down the policeman whom he had injured in an attempt to make amends. During casting the director picks a boy who during the audition declares that he wants to "save the world" to act as his young self. The policeman initially chooses someone handsome to interpret his young self the director decides that a frail boy should be cast, to the policeman's disdain the film continues production.

The director tells his young version about his cousin, his old lover which he used as a distraction to attack the policeman, after trying to cast the daughter of his cousin and failing due to her mother's control the duo decide to cast the cousin of the young director, with them imitating the director's old manners. Meanwhile the policeman reveals to his younger self how after the incident he spent decades searching for the girl, as he wanted to give her a flower that day, later he teaches him the manners of an officer, giving him a suit made by the same tailor who made his police uniform.

Through filming, the duos pass by each other, without realizing it. On the day of the stabbing scene, the young director breaks down in tears, stating he can't stab the young policeman even if the knife is fake and that he "can't save the world with this", despite this the scene is carried out until the policeman realizes the girl and the director set him up, which makes him leave angrily.

The young policeman convinces the policeman to continue on with the film, but with the condition that he shoots the girl once she approaches. During the final day of shooting the young policeman and young directors experience a tense buildup, culminating in the young policeman showing him the flower in the vase and the young director showing him a piece of bread which was originally meant for hiding the knife, the film ends with a frame of the young cousin standing between the two objects.

== Cast ==
- Mirhadi Tayebi as The Policeman
- Mohsen Makhmalbaf as The Director
- Ammar Tafti as The Young Director
- Ali Bakhsi as The Young Policeman
- Maryam Mohamadamini as The Young Woman

== Reception ==
=== Critical response ===
Although the film was banned in Iran, Western critics were very positive toward the film. Mike D'Angelo called A Moment of Innocence "a dizzying hybrid of autobiography, documentary, and mythology,...[a] bold... testament to our innate decency and capacity for love," and said that it "ends with the greatest final freeze-frame since The 400 Blows -- maybe the greatest final freeze-frame ever." Stuart Klawans of The Nation said readers should contact him immediately "if [they] see another film with so urgent and complete an image of people's hurts, fears, needs and dreams." One of the few negative critical reactions came from Mick Lasalle of the San Francisco Chronicle, who called the film "grindingly dull," and "muddled and endless" and implied that Makhmalbaf's filmmaking was "self-indulgent, meandering, pointless and irritating."

On the review aggregator website Rotten Tomatoes, 89% of 27 critics' reviews are positive. The website's consensus reads: "Probing the nature of truth and memory with tenderness and humor, A Moment of Innocence serves as a breathtaking high point in Iranian director Mohsen Makhmalbaf's filmography." Metacritic, which uses a weighted average, assigned the film a score of 70 out of 100, based on 9 critics, indicating "generally favorable" reviews.

In the 2012 Greatest Films of All Time critics' poll by Sight & Sound, A Moment of Innocence was ranked 235th among all films, making it tied with The House is Black, Where Is the Friend's Home?, and The Wind Will Carry Us as the second-highest ranked Iranian film (behind Close-Up, which Makhmalbaf also starred in).

The film won a Crystal Simorgh in the category Best Sound Recording. It was won by Nezamoddin Kiaie.
