= Tales of Kish =

1999 film

- Iran Film Poster
- Directed by: Abolfazl Jalili; Mohsen Makhmalbaf; Nasser Taghvai
- Written by: Abolfazl Jalili; Mohsen Makhmalbaf; Nasser Taghvai
- Produced by: Mohamad Ahmadi; Mohsen Gharib
- Starring: Hossein Panahi
- Release date: 14 May 1999
- Running time: 72 minutes
- Country: Iran
- Language: Persian

Tales of Kish (Persian: قصه‌های کیش, romanized: Ghessé hayé kish, and also known as Kish Tales) is a 1999 Iranian drama anthology film. It was entered into the 1999 Cannes Film Festival.

== Cast ==
- Hossein Panahi as Shanbeh (segment "Greek Boat, The")
- Atefeh Razavi as Wife (segment "Greek Boat, The")
- Hafez Pakdel as (segment "Ring, The")
- Mohamad A. Babhan as Man (segment "Door, The")
- Norieh Mahigiran as Daughter (segment "Door, The")
