= The Apple (1998 film) =

- Japanese film poster
- Directed by: Samira Makhmalbaf
- Written by: Samira Makhmalbaf; Mohsen Makhmalbaf
- Starring: Ghorban Ali Naderi; Azizeh Mohamadi; Massoumah Naderi; Zahra Naderi; Zahra Saghrisaz
- Cinematography: Mohamad Ahmadi; Ebrahim Ghafori; Mezssam Makhmalbaf
- Distributed by: New Yorker Films (United States)
- Release date: 27 May 1998
- Running time: 86 minutes
- Country: Iran
- Languages: Persian and Azerbaijani

The Apple (Persian: سیب, translit. Sib) is the 1998 directorial debut by Samira Makhmalbaf, daughter of Iranian director Mohsen Makhmalbaf. The film is based on a true story and features the real people that actually lived it. The film was screened in the Un Certain Regard section at the 1998 Cannes Film Festival.

== Plot ==
An unemployed man and his blind wife lock up their two daughters for eleven years. Their neighbours call social workers to investigate the situation and the results lead the girls on a bittersweet path to the rest of the world.

== Cast ==
- Massoumeh Naderi - Massoumeh
- Zahra Naderi - Zahra
- Ghorban Ali Naderi - Father
- Azizeh Mohamadi - Azizeh
- Zahra Saghrisaz

== Reception ==
The film received a positive reaction from critics. On the review aggregator website Rotten Tomatoes, 85% of 48 critics' reviews are positive. The website's consensus reads: "The Apple flirts with exploitation, but this boldly metaphorical work boasts a tart, complex crunch."
