= Sex & Philosophy =

2005 film

- Russian poster
- Directed by: Mohsen Makhmalbaf
- Written by: Mohsen Makhmalbaf
- Produced by: Mohsen Makhmalbaf
- Starring: Daler Nazarov; Mariam Gaibova; Farzona Beknazarova
- Cinematography: Ebrahim Ghafori
- Edited by: Mohsen Makhmalbaf
- Music by: Daler Nazarov; Nahid Zeinalpur
- Production company: Makhmalbaf Film House
- Release date: 2 September 2005 (Montreal)
- Running time: 105 minutes
- Countries: France; Iran; Tajikistan
- Languages: Russian; Tajik
- Budget: $300,000
- Box office: $22,978

Sex & Philosophy (Persian: سکس و فلسفه, romanized: Sex o phalsapheh) is a 2005 internationally co-produced drama film directed, written and produced by Mohsen Makhmalbaf. Starring Daler Nazarov, Mariam Gaibova, and Farzona Beknazarova, the film is set in Tajikistan. Sex & Philosophy premiered at the Montreal World Film Festival in September 2005. It saw a theatrical release in South Korea, Turkey, Italy, Singapore and Russia. Sex & Philosophy was Tajikistan's official selection for the Academy Award for Best Foreign Language Film but it was disqualified because English subtitles were not added to the film in the time allowed by the Academy.

== Plot ==
In the midst of a mid-life crisis Jan, a 40-year-old dancing teacher, decides to tell his four lovers about each other. He gathers them together to explain his actions, going into details about why he first started his affairs with each of them. He gives them each a watch and they leave. Later, he discovers that one of his lovers was also having an affair with three other men when she calls him to a similar meeting and begins explaining why she begins an affair with each of them.

== Cast ==
- Daler Nazarov as Jan
- Mariam Gaibova
- Farzona Beknazarova
- Tahmineh Ebrahimova
- Malohat Abdulloeva
- Nadira Abdullaeva
- Ali Akbar Abdulloev
- Dilafruz Burkhanova
- Lutfullo Davlat
- Malika Gadoeva
- Nika Gafurova
- Gulrukhsor Gayurova
- Turana Ismail
- Tamanno Karimova
- Nodira Mazitova
- Nasiba Nasimova
- Ahliddin Sharipov
- Neekqadam Shohnazarov
- Zarina Shugaipova
- Nikolai Tibikin
- Margarita Yen

== Awards ==
- 2005 Nomination for the Grand Prix des Amériques at the Montreal World Film Festival

== See also ==
- List of submissions to the 78th Academy Awards for Best Foreign Language Film
- List of Tajikistani submissions for the Academy Award for Best Foreign Language Film
