= Gabbeh (film) =

1996 film by Mohsen Makhmalbaf

- Promotional poster for Gabbeh
- Directed by: Mohsen Makhmalbaf
- Written by: Mohsen Makhmalbaf
- Produced by: Khalil Doroudchi
- Starring: Shaghayeh Djodat
- Cinematography: Mahmoud Kalari
- Edited by: Mohsen Makhmalbaf
- Music by: Hossein Alizadeh
- Release date: 26 June 1996
- Running time: 79 minutes
- Countries: Iran; France
- Language: Persian

Gabbeh (Persian: گبه) is a 1996 Iranian film directed by Mohsen Makhmalbaf. It was screened in the Un Certain Regard section at the 1996 Cannes Film Festival. The film was selected as the Iranian entry for the Best Foreign Language Film at the 70th Academy Awards, but was not accepted as a nominee.

== Plot ==
The film derives its name from a type of Persian rug. It begins by showing an elderly couple, carrying their gabbeh, walking towards a river hoping to wash it. When the rug is spread upon the ground, a girl, referred to as Gabbeh, magically comes out of it. The film follows her story and the audience learn about her family, her uncle who is hoping to find a bride, and, most importantly, her longing for a young man she hopes to marry.

== Cast ==
- Abbas Sayah as Uncle
- Shaghayeh Djodat as Gabbeh
- Hossein Moharami as Old Man
- Rogheih Moharami as Old Woman
- Parvaneh Ghalandari

== Release ==
The film had its world premiere at the 1996 Cannes Film Festival. Shortly after it was banned in Iran for being "subversive".

== Reception ==
On review aggregator Rotten Tomatoes, 90% of 20 critics gave the film a positive review, with an average rating of 7.3/10, earning it a "Fresh" score.

== Awards ==
- Best Director and Special Critics Award, Sitges Film Festival, 1996
- Silver Screen Award, Singapore International Film Festival
- Best Artistic Contribution Award, Tokyo International Film Festival
- One of 10 selected films by critics – Times (USA) 1996.
