= The Silence (1998 film) =

1998 film by Mohsen Makhmalbaf

The Silence (Sokout)
- DVD cover
- Directed by: Mohsen Makhmalbaf
- Written by: Mohsen Makhmalbaf
- Produced by: Marin Karmitz
- Starring: Tahmineh Normatova
- Cinematography: Ebrahim Ghafori
- Edited by: Mohsen Makhmalbaf
- Release date: 1998
- Running time: 76 minutes
- Countries: Iran; Tajikistan; France
- Language: Tajik

The Silence (Persian: سکوت, romanized: Sokut, Tajik: Сукут, romanized: Sukut) is an Iranian–Tajik film from 1998. It is directed by Iranian film maker Mohsen Makhmalbaf. The movie is about a little boy who has the onerous task of earning money for his family, but is always enchanted and distracted by music.

== Synopsis ==
Khorshid lives with his mother in a house near a river somewhere in Tajikistan. The landlord comes every morning to ask for the rent. Khorshid has to provide the money or else they'll have to leave. His blindness has given him an amazing skill in tuning musical instruments which gets him a job at an instrument making workshop. But Khorshid is mesmerized by sonorous music all the time; whenever he hears a great musician play, he loses track of time and place. On his way to the workshop, street musicians' performances captivate him, causing him to arrive late at work. This causes him to lose his place and have to work late. He struggles to find a balance between his love of music and his task as a breadwinner.

== Overview ==
Makhmalbaf himself divided his works into four phases in an article in The New York Times: "The first four films, made before 1985, are thinly disguised religious proselytizing. From 1985 to 1990, when the ruling mullahs loosened censorship enough to allow movies to focus on general social problems, his perspective changed...After this, Mr. Makhmalbaf largely abandoned traditional narrative...First, he made what he calls his philosophical films, then he made the recent poetic movies that have landed him in trouble with the censors." Sokout belongs to his poetic style of film making, where he gets rid of the shackles of classical narration and depicts some of his favorite themes by using symbolism coming from Sufi traditions.

== Sufism, music and universal truth ==
The movie is replete with symbols of Sufism. From the use of music to achieve ecstasy; the nature, and the broken mirror, the repeated image of the river, to the light coming from above, the symbolic representation of mystic interpretations of Islam appear throughout the movie. Makhmalbaf does not stay local on this matter. His use of Symphony No. 5 (Beethoven) shows that he deliberately wants to say the themes he is referring to are of a universal nature according to him, and not just mundane, ephemeral, matters. The broken mirror is an icon borrowed from Rumi, which represents only a part of the truth. Everyone possesses a part of the mirror, i.e. a part of the truth, and thinks she has all of it. But, of course to a Sufi, none of the parts equals to the whole truth. Professor Ridgeon is among those who emphasize extensively on the implications of the mirror in Makhmalbaf's movies, particularly this one.

== Censorship ==
The film is banned in Iran since 1998.

== Cast ==
- Tahmineh Normatova as Khorshid
- Nadereh Abdelahyeva as Nadereh
- Goibibi Ziadolahyeva as Khorshid's mother

== Awards ==
- In 1998, the film won:
  - 'CinemAvvenire' Award: Cinema, Man, Nature - Mohsen Makhmalbaf
  - Sergio Trasatti Award - Special Mention - Mohsen Makhmalbaf
  - The President of the Italian Senate's Gold Medal - Mohsen Makhmalbaf
