= Time of Love =

1990 film by Mohsen Makhmalbaf

- Directed by: Mohsen Makhmalbaf
- Written by: Mohsen Makhmalbaf
- Produced by: Abbas Randjbar
- Starring: Shiva Gered; Abdurrahman Palay; Menderes Samancilar; Aken Tunj
- Edited by: Mohsen Makhmalbaf
- Release dates: 1990 (Iran); September 7, 2001 (Turkey)
- Running time: 75 minutes
- Countries: Iran; Turkey
- Languages: Turkish; Persian

Time of Love (Persian: نوبت عاشقی, romanized: Nobat-e âšeqi; Turkish: Aşkın Zamanı) is a 1990 romantic drama film written and directed by Mohsen Makhmalbaf. The film consists of three episodes, all with relatively similar plots. Although categorized as an Iranian film, Time of Love was mostly shot in Istanbul, Turkey and the dialogues are both in Turkish and Persian. It was screened in the Un Certain Regard section at the 1995 Cannes Film Festival.

== Plot ==
First Narrative:

Young Gozal, whose husband is a taxi driver, has an affair with a young blond shoeshine boy. One day an old man who is hard of hearing is recording birds' songs when he hears what they say to each other. So he finds out about their affair and tells everything to Gozal's black-haired husband. The black–haired man kills the young blond boy and injures Gozal and then surrenders himself to the court. He is sentenced to death and is thrown into the sea as is preferred execution method. Gozal commits suicide in her regular meeting place.

Second Narrative:

This time the blond–haired man and Gozal are husband and wife, and Gozal is in love with the black – haired. The blond-haired is the taxi driver and the black–haired is a hawker. The old man gets to know about the affair between Gozal and the black-haired and informs the blond–haired. He intends to kill the black – haired but is killed himself. The black–haired is sentenced to death and as he asks, he is hanged on the tree under which he saw Gozal for the first time. Gozal commits suicide in the hospital.

Third Narrative:

Like the first narrative, once again the black–haired and Gozal are husband and wife and Gozal has an affair with the blond-haired. The old man tells Gozal's husband about this affair. The two rivals start fighting, but the black-haired refuses to kill the blond-haired when he is in the situation to do so. This way he gives his rival the chance to tell him but the black–haired holds the wedding party of Gozal and the blond–haired. In the wedding ceremony, the court judge who has resigned from his job due to its difficulties is present. The black–haired give the bride and groom a lift to their house and gives his taxi to them as the wedding present. The blond–haired who has decided to give Gozal back to the black–haired, runs after him but instead he finds the old man who confesses that he has been in love with Gozal for many years.

== Cast ==
- Shiva Gered
- Abdurrahman Palay
- Menderes Samancilar
- Aken Tunj
