= Mohsen Makhmalbaf =

Iranian film director, writer, editor, and producer

Mohsen Makhmalbāf
- محسن مخملباف
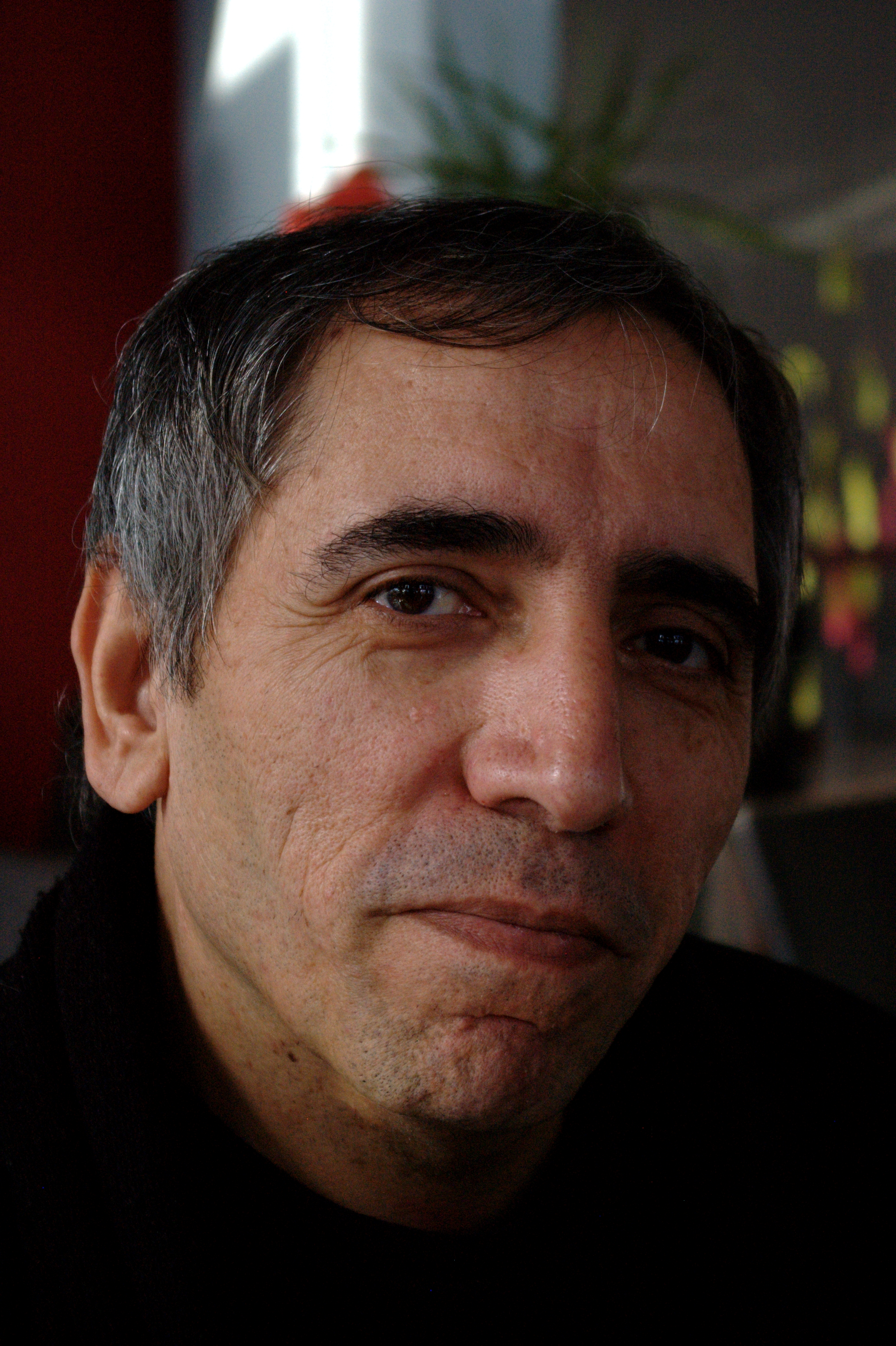
- Born: May 29, 1957 (age 69); Tehran, Imperial State of Iran
- Years active: 1981–present
- Political party: Mojahedin of the Islamic Revolution Organization (1979–1980s)
- Spouses: Fatemeh Meshkini (m. 1978; died 1982) Marzieh Meshkini (m. 1987)
- Children: Samira; Meysam; Hana
- Awards: Freedom to Create Prize; Federico Fellini Honour

Mohsen Makhmalbaf (Persian: محسن مخملباف, [mohˈsen mæxmɒːlˈbɒːf]) (born May 29, 1957) is an Iranian film director, writer, film editor, and producer. He has made more than 20 feature films, won 50 awards, and served as a juror in more than 15 major film festivals. His award-winning films include A Moment of Innocence (1996) and Kandahar. His latest documentary is The Gardener and latest feature The President.

Makhmalbaf's films have been widely presented at international film festivals since the early 21st century. The director belongs to the new wave movement of Iranian cinema. Time selected Makhmalbaf's 2001 film Kandahar as one of the top 100 films of all time. In 2006, he was a member of the Jury at the Venice Film Festival.

Makhmalbaf left Iran in 2005 shortly after the election of Mahmoud Ahmadinejad. He has lived in Paris since the events of the 2009 Iranian presidential election.

== Life ==
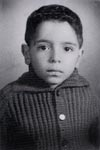
Makhmalbaf (childhood)

Makhmalbaf was born in Tehran on May 29, 1957. At the age of 15, he became involved in a militant group fighting against the rule of Mohammad Reza Pahlavi, the Shah of Iran. At the age of 17, he was imprisoned for stabbing a policeman and was sentenced to death. After serving five years of his sentence, he was released in the wake of the Iranian Revolution. He left Iran in 2005.

== Career ==
Makhmalbaf is a major figure in Iranian cinema. His films have explored the relationship between the individual and a larger social and political environment. As a result, his work serves as an extended commentary on the historical progression of the Iranian state and its people. Makhmalbaf has worked in several genres, from realist films to fantasy and surrealism, minimalism, and large frescoes of everyday life, with a preference (common to Iranian directors) for the themes of childhood and cinema.

In 1981, he wrote the screenplay for Towjeeh, directed by Manuchehr Haghaniparast. In 1982, he wrote the screenplay for Marg Deegari, directed by Mohammad-Reza Honarmand. He made his first film, Tobeh Nosuh, in 1983, and Boycott, a film set in pre-revolutionary Iran, in 1985. The latter tells the story of Valeh (Majid Majidi), a young man sentenced to death for Communist tendencies. It is widely believed to be based on Makhmalbaf's own experiences.

Makhmalbaf portrays human despair, exploitation, and resilience in The Cyclist (1987), a movie about Nasim, a poor Afghan refugee in Iran in desperate need of money for his ailing wife. Nasim agrees to ride a bicycle in a small circle for one week for the money he needs to pay his wife's medical bills.

In 1989, Iranian director Abbas Kiarostami read in the newspaper about an incident in which a Tehrani man named Hossain Sabzian tricked a family into believing he was Makhmalbaf. Kiarostami adapted the case as the 1990 docufiction film Close-Up, and recruited Makhmalbaf himself to appear in the final scene of the film. Close Up is now regarded as a masterpiece of world cinema and was voted by critics onto 2012's Sight and Sound list of The Top 50 Greatest Films of All Time.

Time of Love (1991) is Makhmalbaf's ninth feature film. It is the first film of what he calls his "third period". It is a romantic trilogy that offers three variations of the same story.

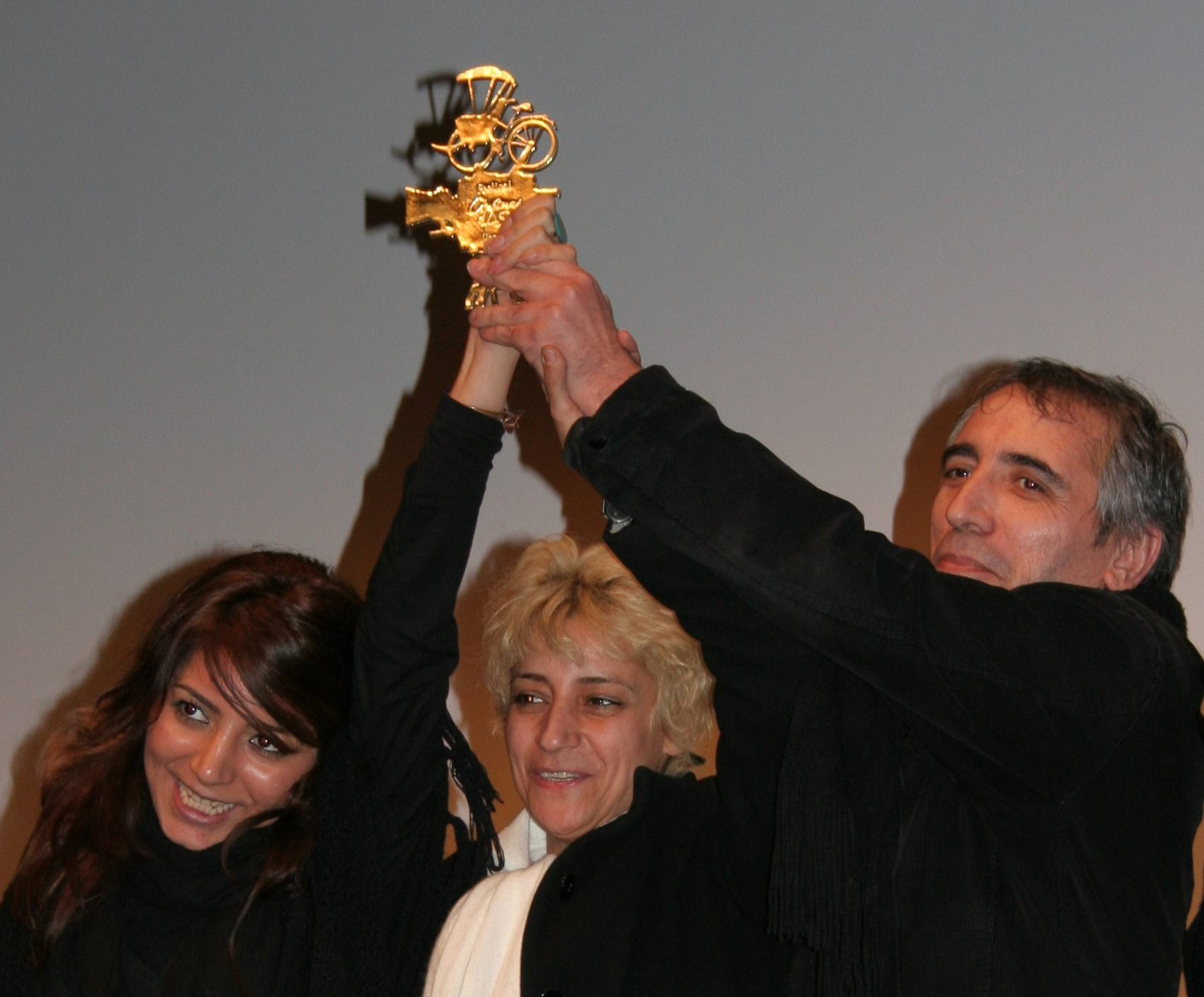
Hana Makhmalbaf, Marzieh Meshkini and Mohsen Makhmalbaf, receiving the Cyclo d'Or at the Vesoul International Film Festival of Asian Cinema in 2009

Makhmalbaf directed Gabbeh in 1996. The film follows the nomadic Ghashghai people, whose bright, bold carpets tell stories. The main thread features a young woman who loves a mysterious stranger but is forbidden to marry him. The film is romantic and non-realistic, with events seeming to leap around in time and space, much like a dream.

Makhmalbaf took time off from directing in 1996 to form the Makhmalbaf Film House, a school for young filmmakers. It quickly became a private production house for the increasing number of filmmakers in his family. In 1997, his 17-year-old daughter Samira directed The Apple, using him as a scriptwriter and editor. Makhmalbaf's wife, Marzieh Meshkini, worked as an assistant director to her daughter and then took up directing herself.

Kandahar (2001) is a fictional odyssey inspired by a true story set in Afghanistan before the September 11 attacks. The Taliban passed laws stripping women of civil rights and of their hopes for their futures. A Western-cultured Afghan woman returns to the country to prevent her sister's suicide during the last eclipse of the 20th century.

I witnessed about 20,000 men, women, and children around the city of Herat starving to death. They couldn't walk and were scattered on the ground awaiting the inevitable. This was the result of the recent famine. That same day the then United Nations High Commissioner for Refugees, Japan's Sadako Ogata, also visited these same people and promised that the world would help them. Three months later, I heard on Iranian radio that Madame Ogata gave the number of Afghans dying of hunger to a million nationwide.

I concluded that nobody demolished the statue of Buddha; it crumbled out of shame. Out of shame for the world's ignorance toward Afghanistan. It broke down, knowing its greatness didn't do any good.

— Limbs of no body : World's indifference to the Afghan tragedy, June 20, 2001

== Early years of revolution ==
In contrast to his later career, for about a decade after the revolution, Makhmalbaf expressed views and made films that served revolutionary art in the cultural atmosphere of Iran.

Some pre-revolutionary filmmakers note there were celebrities hurt by Makhmalbaf's positions in this period. Saeed Motalebi, an established writer and director before the revolution, is one of the people who has repeatedly recounted stories about how Makhmalbaf's stances affected pre-revolutionary stars. One of these accounts refers to the 1982 film The Imperilled (Barzakhi-ha) written by Motalebi and had four pre-revolutionary male stars in the lead roles. It was directed by Iraj Ghaderi and, with its patriotic story about resisting foreign invasion, it was a chance for Fardin, Malek-Motiei, Ghaderi and Rad to renew their threatened careers as actors in the post-revolutionary atmosphere. The film was a hit and became the highest-grossing Iranian film of all time in its short period of theater screening. But it was soon banned, and consequently the four actors were banned from working.

Motalebi says that Makhmalbaf turned people against the film and its actors:

On one Friday Mr. Mohsen Makhmalbaf gathered a couple of people and they started collecting signatures for a petition which was written on a scroll, stating that "We have made a revolution while these actors are transgressors." They did it right in front of that theater in the Revolution Square near the university of Tehran. They said "Look how theaters are crowded while Friday events are deserted." That's how they stopped my film. Then a reporter who was cued to ask something about our film, went and told the then prime minister (Mir-Hossein Mousavi) "There is a film in theaters whose writer wants to convey that people who are fighting in the fronts are problematic persons." The prime minister replied, "These are leftovers of junk intellectuals who will soon go to the dustbin of history." Malek-Motiei became jobless and turned his garage into a pastry shop. Ghaderi put some rice bags in his office and became a rice dealer. Fardin opened a pastry shop too and when I visited him, I used to wait outside as long as there were no customers so that he wouldn't feel ashamed when he saw me. These were all caused by those illogical efforts, which I will never forgive.

In a 1986 letter by Makhmalbaf, he attacks such filmmakers as Dariush Mehrjui and Ali Hatami. Addressing Mohammad Beheshti Shirazi, then head of Farabi Cinema Foundation, which was Iran's main governmental film production company, Makhmalbaf says: "Two hours ago when I saw The Lodgers I was ready to attach a grenade to myself and hold Mehrjui to take both of us to the other world."

In later years, Makhmalbaf became deeply disillusioned, first by the Islamic regime, and soon after by Islamic ideology. By the early 1990s, he was one of the most outspoken critics of the government in Iran. Amir-Hossein Fardi, a writer and Makhmalbaf's former colleague, has said that Makhmalbaf has not changed and that his inalterable characteristic has been an extremist attitude, then pro-revolution, and now anti-revolution.

== Political views ==
In December 2023, together with 50 other filmmakers, Makhmalbaf signed an open letter published in Libération, demanding a ceasefire and an end to the killing of civilians amid the 2023 Israeli invasion of the Gaza Strip. They asked for a humanitarian corridor into Gaza to be established for humanitarian aid, and the release of hostages.

== Degrees and honors ==
- Mohsen Makhmalbaf: Selected as the best filmmaker after the revolution by readers of cinema publications, 1988
- A Moment of Innocence: Among Top Ten Films of the Decade – Awarded by International Festival Directors and Critics 1999
- "Federico Fellini Honor" from UNESCO in Paris, 2001 (France)
- "Freedom to Create Prize" for his human rights activity and promoting social justice through his art, Art Action, England, 2009
- Honorary Degree of Doctor of Cinema from Nanterre University, France, 2010
- Honorary Degree of Doctor of Literature from St Andrews University, Scotland, 2011

=== Honours ===
- Jury member at the 2024 Busan International Film Festival for its competition section 'BIFF Mecenat Award'.

== Filmography ==
Year	English title	Original title	Length	Notes
1983	Pure Repentance	Tawba Nasuh	100 minutes	
1984	Two Blind Eyes	Do Cheshme Bisoo	102 minutes	
1984	Seeking Refuge	Isti'azah	89 minutes	
1986	Boycott	Boycott	95 minutes	
1987	The Peddler	Dastforoush	90 minutes	
1989	The Cyclist	Bicycleran	83 minutes	
1989	Marriage of the Blessed	Arousi-ye Khouban	70 minutes	
1990	The Nights of Zayande-rood	Shabhaye Zayandeh-rood	100 minutes/63 minutes (censored)	
1991	Time of Love	Nobat e Asheghi	70 minutes	
1992	Once Upon a Time, Cinema	Nasseroddin Shah Actor-e Cinema	92 minutes	
1993	Images from the Qajar Period	Tasvir Dar Doran-e Ghajar	18 minutes	Short documentary
1993	The Artist	Honarpisheh	86 minutes	
1993	Stone and Glass	Sang-o-Shisheh	20 minutes	Short documentary
1995	Hello Cinema	Salaam Cinema	81 minutes	Docudrama
1996	A Moment of Innocence	Nun va Goldoon	78 minutes	
1996	Gabbeh		72 minutes	
1997	The School the Wind Blew Away	Madrese-i ke bad bord	8 minutes	Short
1998	The Silence	Sokout	74 minutes	
1999	Tales of Kish	Ghessé hayé kish	72 minutes	Segment The Door
2000	Tales of an Island	Dastanhaye Jazireh	76 minutes	Segment Testing Democracy
2001	Kandahar	Safar-e Ghandehar	85 minutes	
2001	The Afghan Alphabet	Alefbay-e afghan	46 minutes	Documentary
2005	Sex & Philosophy	Sex o phalsapheh	102 minutes	
2006	Scream of the Ants	Faryad moorcheha	85 minutes	
2006	The Chair	Sandali	8 minutes	Short
2009	The Man Who Came with the Snow		75 minutes	Co-directed with Marzieh Meshkini
2012	The Gardener	Bagheban	87 minutes	Documentary
2013	The Endless Smile	Labkhande-bi-payan	52 minutes	Documentary
2014	The President		118 minutes	
2015	The Tenant		18 minutes	Short
2019	Marghe and Her Mother		101 minutes	Set in Italy

Films banned in Iran

- The Nights of Zayande-rood (1990), banned since 1990
- Time of Love (1991), banned since 1991
- Once Upon a Time, Cinema (1992), banned from 1992 until 1993
- A Moment of Innocence (1996), banned from 1996 until 1997
- The Silence (1998), banned from 1998 until 2000
- The Gardener (2012), banned since 2012

Film appearances

- Marriage of the Blessed (1989), directed by himself
- Close-Up (1990), directed by Abbas Kiarostami
- Hello Cinema (1995), directed by himself
- A Moment of Innocence (1996), directed by himself
- Tales of an Island (2000), directed by himself and Dariush Mehrjui

== See also ==
- Cinema of Iran
