= Cinema of Iran =

- No. of screens: 596 (2018)
  - Per capita: 0.7 per 100,000 (2018)

Produced feature films (2017)
- Total: 200

Number of admissions (2018)
- Total: 28,537,410
- National films: 28,514,921

Gross box office (2018)
- Total: $23.8 million

The cinema of Iran (Persian: سینمای ایران), or of Persia, refers to the film industry in Iran. In particular, Iranian art films have garnered international recognition. Iranian films are usually written and spoken in the Persian language. Iran has been lauded as one of the best exporters of cinema in the 1990s. Some critics now rank Iran as the world's most important national cinema, artistically, with a significance that invites comparison to Italian neorealism and similar movements in past decades. A range of international film festivals have honoured Iranian cinema in the last twenty years.

Many film critics from around the world have praised Iranian cinema as one of the world's most important artistic cinemas.

== History ==
=== Visual arts in Iran ===
The earliest examples of visual representations in Iranian history may be traced back to the bas-reliefs in Persepolis (c. 500 BC). Bas-relief is a method of sculpting which entails carving or etching away the surface of a flat piece of stone or metal. Persepolis was the ritual center of the ancient kingdom of Achaemenids and "the figures at Persepolis remain bound by the rules of grammar and syntax of visual language."

Iranian visual arts may be said to have peaked about a thousand years later during the Sassanian reign. A bas-relief from this period in Taq Bostan (western Iran) depicts a complex hunting scene. Similar works from the period have been found to articulate movements and actions in a highly sophisticated manner. It is even possible to see the progenitor of the cinema close-up: a wounded wild pig escaping from the hunting ground, among these works of art.

After the conversion from Zoroastrianism to Islam; Persian art continued its visual practices. Persian miniatures provide great examples of such continued attempts. The deliberate lack of perspective in Persian miniature enabled the artist to have different plots and sub-plots within the same image space. A very popular form of such art was Pardeh Khani. Another type of art in the same category was Naqqali.

Popular dramatic performance arts in Iran, before the advent of cinema, include marionettes, sâyeh-bâzi (shadow plays), ru-howzi (comical acts), and ta'ziyeh.

Cinema entered into the public realm, but its cultural and economic capabilities were still unknown. As a consequence, theaters experienced a growing trend at the outset as to reveal economic attractions of cinema. Due to equating him with the Iranian Constitutional Revolutionaries, Mirza Ebrahim Khan Sahhafbashi's Kinetoscopes corridor didn't last for even a month and was closed, resulting in his leaving Iran. Then, it was the turn of Rousi Khan's public theater. It, too, didn't survive for a long time as the public theater was plundered during conflicts between Mohammad Ali Shah and Constitution Revolutionaries and, moreover, he himself fled abroad. After him, it was Ardeshir Khan who introduced new approaches regarding the running of cinema theatres and their use and his legacy lasted until long after him.

=== Early Persian cinema ===
Cinema was only five years old when it came to Persia at the beginning of the 20th century. The first Persian filmmaker was Mirza Ebrahim Khan Akkas Bashi, the official photographer of Muzaffar al-Din Shah, the King of Persia from 1896–1907. After a visit to Paris in July 1900, Akkas Bashi obtained a camera and filmed the Shah's visit to Europe upon the Shah's orders. He is said to have filmed the Shah's private and religious ceremonies, but no copies of such films exist today. A few years after Akkas Bashi started photography, Khan Baba Motazedi, another pioneer in Iranian motion picture photography emerged. He shot a considerable amount of newsreel footage during the reign of Qajar to the Pahlavi dynasty.

The first public screening took place in Tehran in 1904, presented by Mirza Ebrahim Khan Sahaf Bashi. He arranged the screening in the back of his antique shop. In 1905, Sahaf Bashi opened the first movie theater in Cheragh Gaz Avenue in the national capital. In 1909, with fall of the Mohammad Ali Shah Qajar heir of Mozaffar ad-Din Shah Qajar and the success of the constitutionalists, Mehdi Rusi Khan Ivanov lost his support. Consequently, his film theatre and photography studios were destroyed by the public. Soon after, other cinema theatres in Tehran closed down. Movie theatres sprang up again in 1912 with the help of Ardeshir Khan, an Armenian-Iranian. In 1904, Mirza Ebrahim Khan Sahhafbashi opened the first movie theater in Tehran. The cinematographic camera was introduced to Iran in 1929, as yet another tool of modernization. After Mirza Ebrahim Khan, several others like Rusi Khan, Ardeshir Khan, and Ali Vakili tried to establish new movie theaters in Tehran. Until the early 1930s, there were little more than 15 theatres in Tehran and 11 in other provinces. In 1925, Ovanes Ohanian, decided to establish the first film school in Iran. Within five years he managed to run the first session of the school under the name "Parvareshgahe Artistiye Cinema".

=== 1930s and 1940s ===
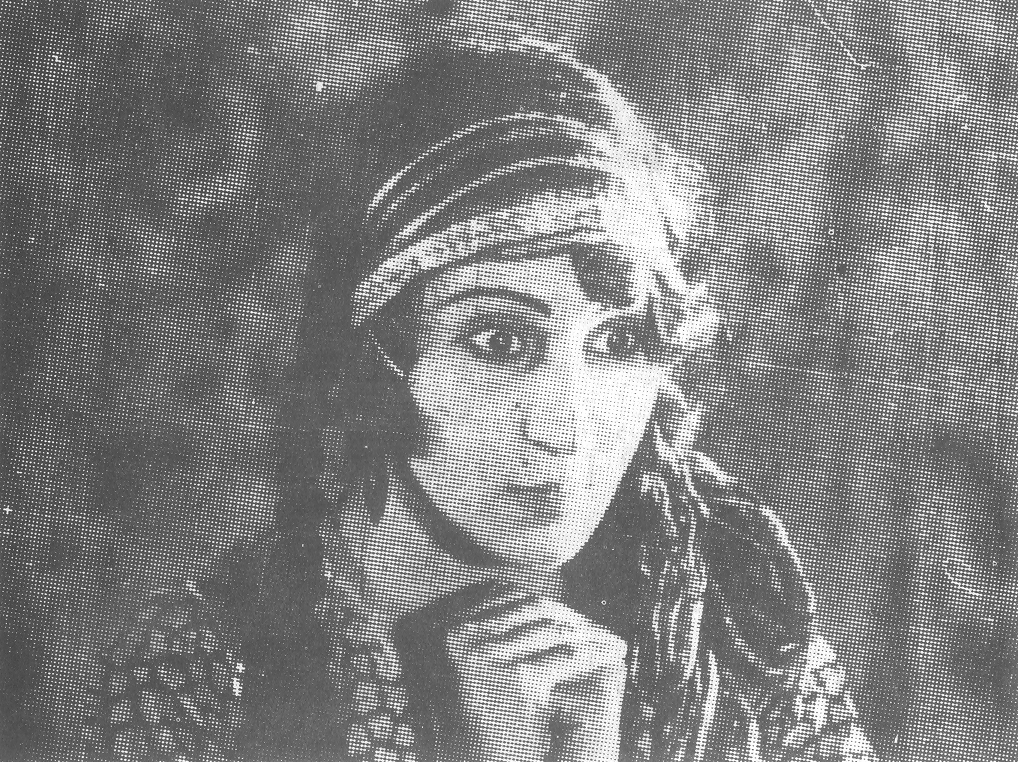
Roohangiz Saminejad in Lor Girl (1933)

In 1930 the first Iranian silent film was made by Professor Ovanes Ohanian called Abi and Rabi. In 1933 he made his second film titled Haji Agha. Later that year, Abdolhossein Sepanta made the first Iranian sound film, entitled Lor Girl, which was released in 1933 in two Tehran cinemas, Mayak and Sepah. The story of the film was based on a comparison between the state of security in Iran at the end of the Qajar dynasty and during Reza Shah period. Sepanta would go on to direct movies such as Ferdowsi (the life story of the most celebrated epic poet of Iran), Shirin and Farhad (a classic Iranian love story), and Black Eyes (the story of Nader Shah's invasion of India). In 1937, he directed Laili and Majnoon, an Eastern love story similar to the English story of Romeo and Juliet.

The present day Iranian film industry owes much of its progress to two industrious personalities, Esmail Koushan and Farrokh Ghaffari. By establishing the first National Iranian Film Society in 1949 at the Iran Bastan Museum and organizing the first Film Week during which English films were exhibited, Ghaffari laid the foundation for alternative and non-commercial films in Iran.

Early Persian directors like Abdolhossein Sepanta and Esmail Koushan took advantage of the richness of Persian literature and ancient Persian mythology. In their work, they emphasized ethics and humanity.

=== Post-revolutionary cinema ===
In the early 1970s, a New Iranian Cinema emerged (cinema motefävet). However, following the Revolution in 1979, a few filmmakers and actors went into exile per new governmental regulations. Between 1979 and 1985, about 100 features were released. While censorship remained under the new regime, it focused on sexual display and European influence.

In 1982, the annual Fajr Film Festival financed films. The Farabi Cinema Foundation then stepped in to try and reassemble the disorganized cinema. The following year, the government began to provide financial aid. This change in regime encouraged a whole new generation of filmmakers, which included female directors as well. With this, the focus shifted to children overcoming obstacles: true stories, lyrical, mystical drama, real-life problems, documentary footage, etc.

Post-revolutionary Iranian cinema has been prevalent in many international forums and festivals for its style, themes, authors, idea of nationhood, and cultural references. Starting With Viva... by Khosrow Sinai, followed by many Iranian directors who emerged in the last few decades, such as Abbas Kiarostami and Jafar Panahi. Kiarostami boosted Iran's cinematography when he won the Palme d'Or at the Cannes Film Festival for Taste of Cherry in 1997.

The continuous presence of Iranian films in prestigious international festivals such as the Cannes Film Festival, the Venice Film Festival, and the Berlin Film Festival attracted world attention to Iranian masterpieces .. In 2006, six Iranian films, of six different styles, represented Iranian cinema at the Berlin Film Festival. Critics considered this a remarkable event in the history of Iranian cinema.

An important step was taken in 1998 when the Iranian government began to fund ethnic cinema. Since then Iranian Kurdistan has seen the rise of numerous filmmakers. In particular, the film industry got momentum in Iranian Kurdistan and the region has seen the emergence of filmmakers such as Bahman Ghobadi, actually the entire Ghobadi family, Ali-Reza Rezai, Khosret Ressoul and many other younger filmmakers.

There is also movie-documentary production, often critical of the society in the name of the Islamic revolution ideal, like the films directed by Mohammadreza Eslamloo.

By the year 2001 the number of features produced in Iran rose to 87 (from 28, which is the number of films that were produced in 1980, after the fall of the Shah). The most popular genres were melodramas and historical pageants which seldom went to festivals. In 1997, the newly elected president, Mohammad Khatami, would eventually come to play a role in helping filmmakers achieve a certain degree of artistic freedom.

== Important figures ==
=== Directors ===
- Bahram Beyzai (1938-2025)
- Dariush Mehrjui (1939-2023)
- Abbas Kiarostami (1940-2016)
- Masoud Kimiai (1941-)
- Nasser Taghvai (1941-2025)
- Ali Hatami (1944-1996)
- Marzieh Boroumand (1951-)
- Pouran Derakhshandeh (1951-)
- Rakhshān Banietemad (1954-)
- Mohsen Makhmalbaf (1957-)
- Hassan Fathi (1959-)
- Kamal Tabrizi (1959-)
- Majid Majidi (1959-)
- Jafar Panahi (1960-)
- Ebrahim Hatamikia (1961-)
- Manijeh Hekmat (1962-)
- Mehran Modiri (1967-)
- Reza Mirkarimi (1967-)
- Bahman Ghobadi (1969-)
- Masoud Dehnamaki (1969-)
- Maryam Moghaddam (1970-)
- Narges Abyar (1970-)
- Asghar Farhadi (1972-)
- Mohammad Rasoulof (1972-)
- Behtash Sanaeeha (1980-)
- Babak Anvari (1983-)
- Panah Panahi (1984-)
- Saeed Roustayi (1989-)

=== Actors ===
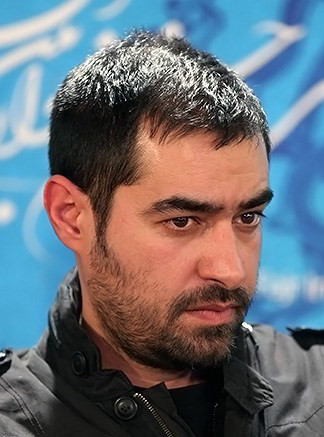
Shahab Hosseini is the only Iranian actor to win the Best Actor award at the Cannes Film Festival.

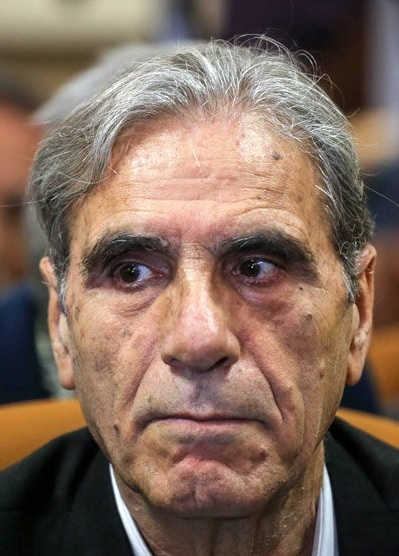
Reza Naji is the first Iranian actor to win the Silver Bear for Best Actor at the Berlin International Film Festival.

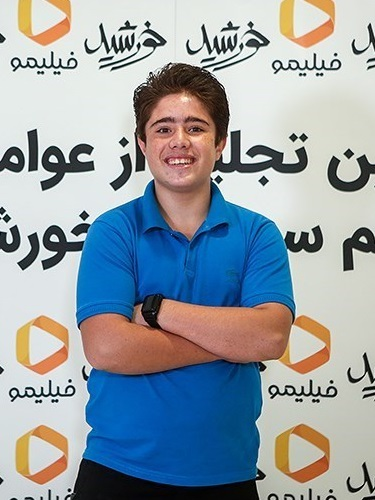
Rouhollah Zamani is the first Iranian actor to win the Marcello Mastroianni Award at the Venice International Film Festival.

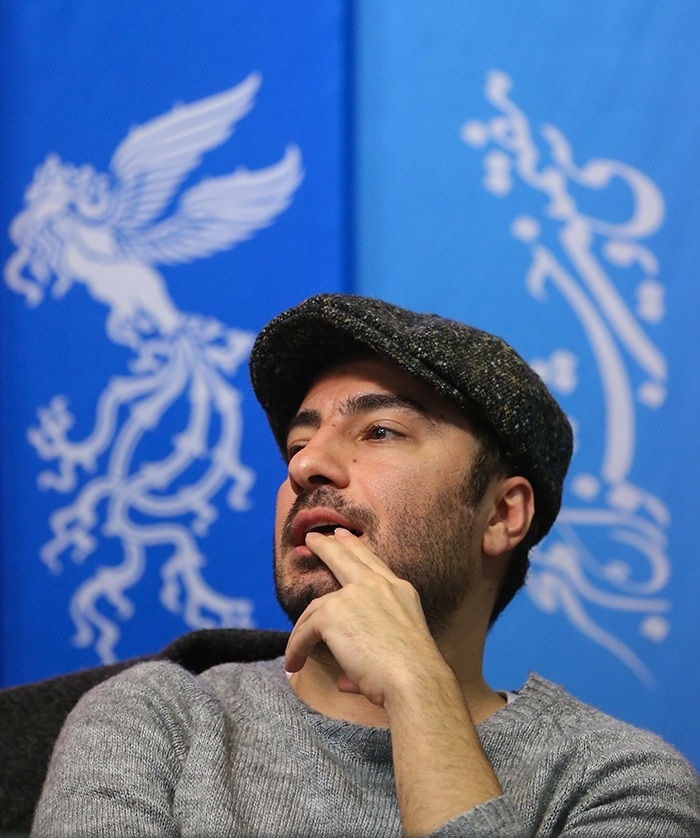
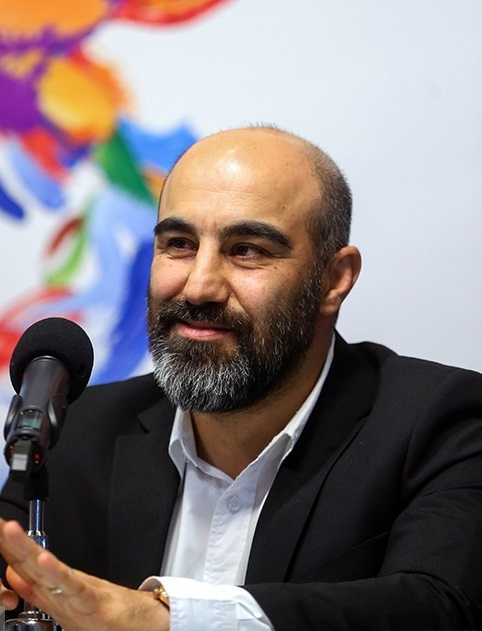
Navid Mohammadzadeh and Mohsen Tanabandeh are the only Iranian actors to win the Orizzonti Award for Best Actor at the Venice International Film Festival.
- Khosrow Shakibai
- Ezzatolah Entezami
- Ali Nassirian
- Behrouz Vosoughi
- Jamshid Mashayekhi
- Davoud Rashidi
- Mohammad Ali Keshavarz
- Naser Malek Motiee
- Mohammad Ali Fardin
- Shahab Hosseini
- Parviz Parastouee
- Faramarz Gharibian
- Homayoun Ershadi
- Hamed Behdad
- Amin Hayaee
- Reza Naji
- Reza Attaran
- Jamshid Hashempour
- Mohsen Tanabandeh
- Navid Mohammadzadeh
- Payman Maadi
- Hadi Hejazifar
- Akbar Abdi
- Dariush Arjmand
- Babak Karimi
- Dariush Farhang
- Amin Tarokh
- Jamshid Hashempour
- Akbar Abdi
- Abolfazl Porarab
- Reza Beik Imanverdi
- Mehran Modiri
- Houtan Shakiba
- Saied Aghakhani
- Alireza Khamseh
- Saeed Rad
- Rouhollah Zamani
- Sirous Gorjestani

=== Actresses ===
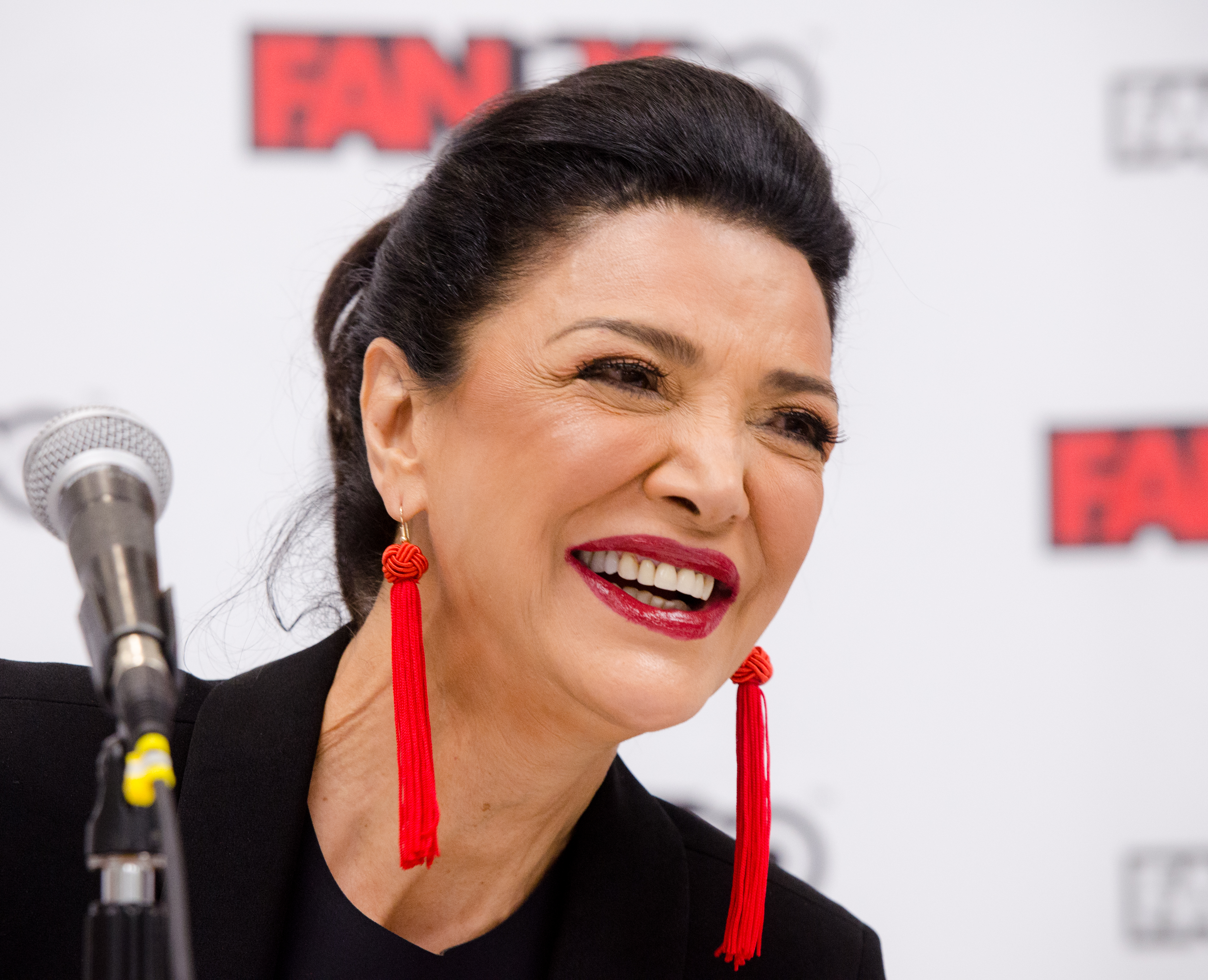
Shohreh Aghdashloo is the first and only Iranian actress to be nominated for an Oscar award.

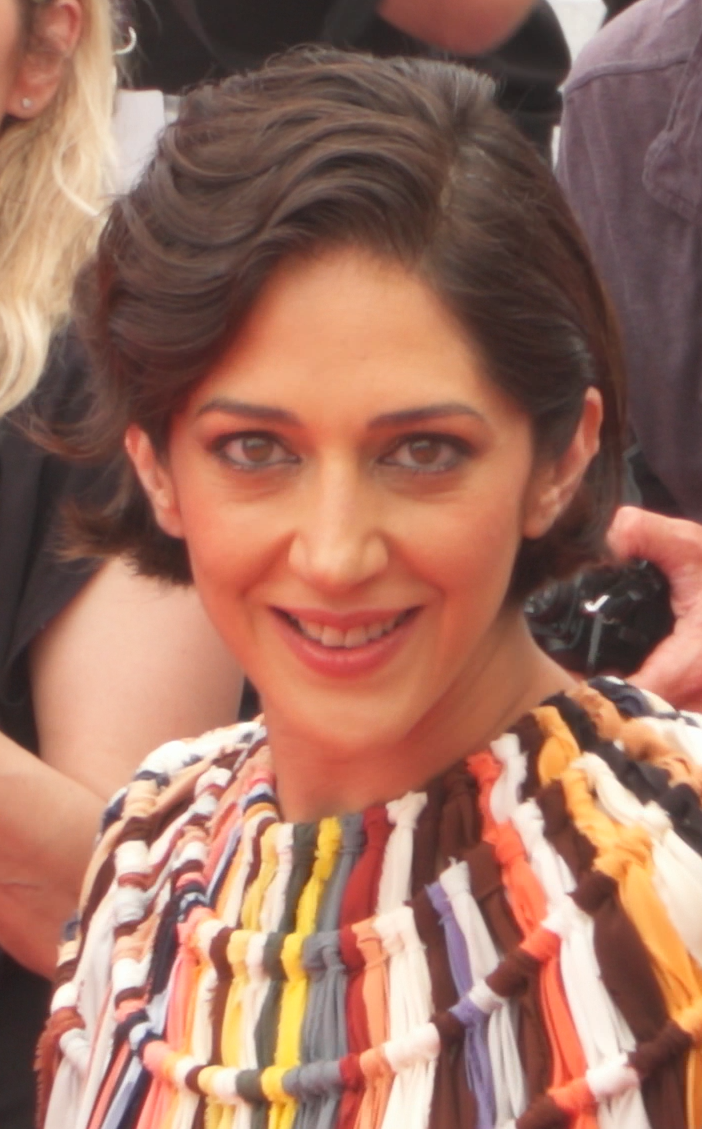
Zar Amir Ebrahimi is the first and only Iranian actress to win the Best Actress award at the Cannes Film Festival.

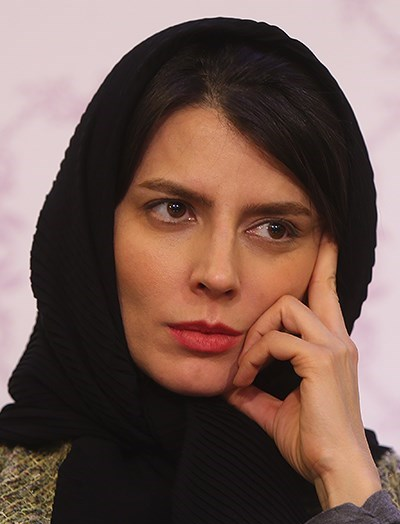
Leila Hatami is the first Iranian actress to win the Silver Bear for Best Actress at the Berlin International Film Festival (jointly with Sareh Bayat, Sarina Farhadi, Kimia Hosseini).

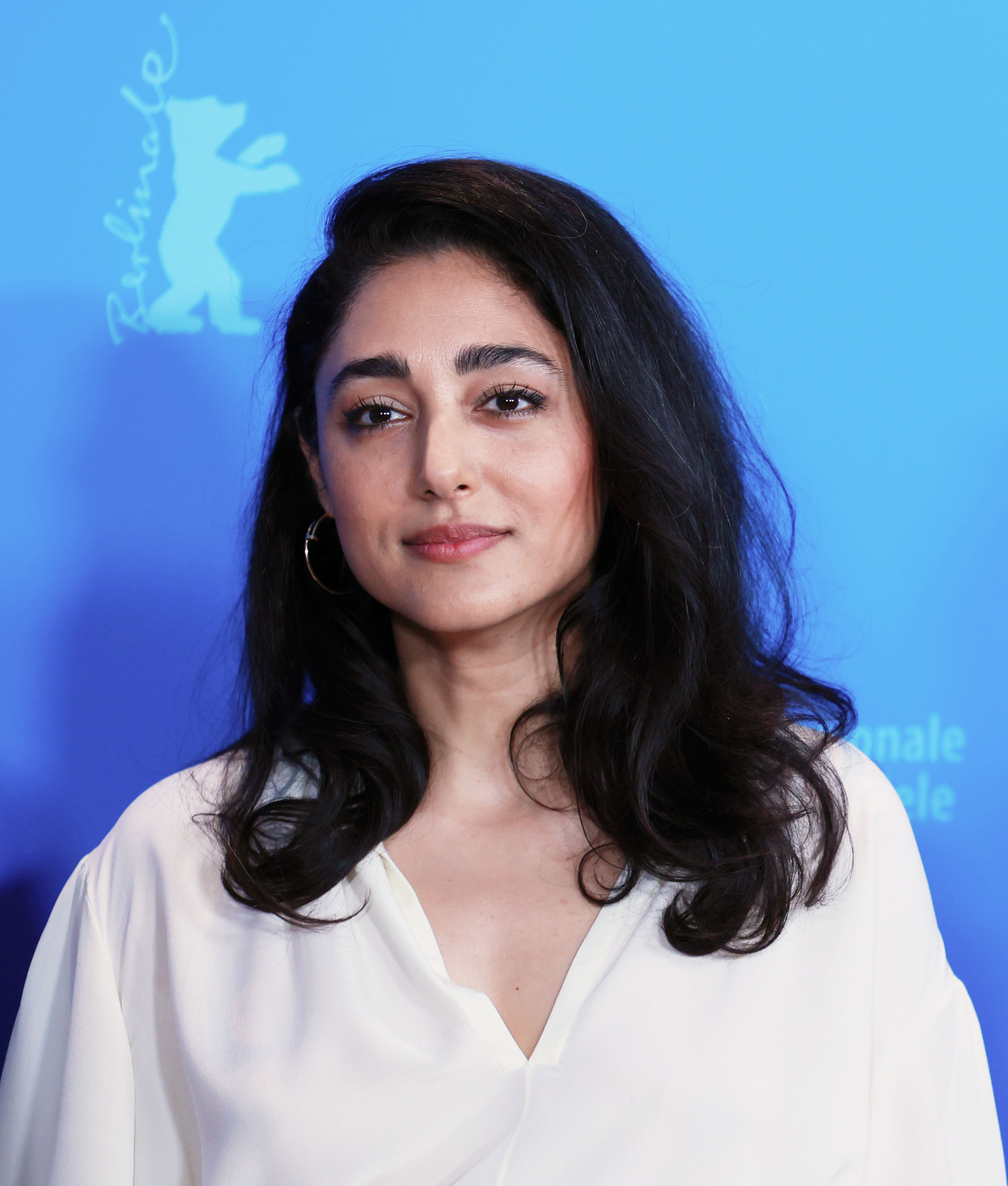
Golshifteh Farahani is the first and only Iranian actress to be nominated for a César award.

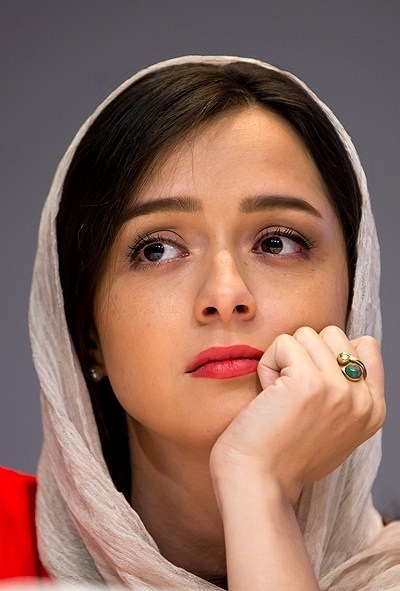
Taraneh Alidoosti is the first and only Iranian actress to win the Leopard for Best Actress at the Locarno International Film Festival.

- Susan Taslimi
- Shohreh Aghdashloo
- Zar Amir Ebrahimi
- Hamideh Kheirabadi
- Leila Hatami
- Hedieh Tehrani
- Taraneh Alidoosti
- Golshifteh Farahani
- Sareh Bayat
- Gohar Kheirandish
- Jamileh Sheikhi
- Farimah Farjami
- Homa Rousta
- Bita Farahi
- Googoosh
- Parvaneh Massoumi
- Golab Adineh
- Niki Karimi
- Parinaz Izadyar
- Elnaz Shakerdoost
- Merila Zarei
- Pantea Bahram
- Baran Kosari
- Negar Javaherian
- Fereshteh Sadre Orafaee
- Fatemah Motamed Aria
- Shabnam Moghaddami
- Sara Bahrami
- Mahtab Keramati
- Samiyeh Lak
- Katayoun Riahi
- Tannaz Tabatabaee
- Mahnaz Afshar
- Hanieh Tavassoli
- Sahar Dolatshahi
- Pegah Ahangarani
- Mozhgan Bayat

== Contemporary Iranian cinema ==
Today, the Iranian box office is dominated by commercial Iranian films. Western films are occasionally shown in movie theaters, while contemporary Hollywood productions are broadcast on state television. Iranian art films are often not screened officially, and are viewable via unlicensed DVDs which are available. Some of these acclaimed films were screened in Iran and had box office success. Examples include Rassul Sadr Ameli's "I'm Taraneh, 15", Rakhshan Bani-Etemad's "Under the skin of the City", Bahman Ghobadi's "Marooned in Iraq" and Manijeh Hekmat's "Women's Prison".

=== Commercial cinema in Iran ===
The internationally award-winning cinema of Iran is quite different from the domestically-oriented films. The latter caters to an entirely different audience, which is largely under the age of 25. This commercial Iranian cinema genre is largely unknown in the West, as the films are targeted at national audiences. This type of films can be listed in three different periods:

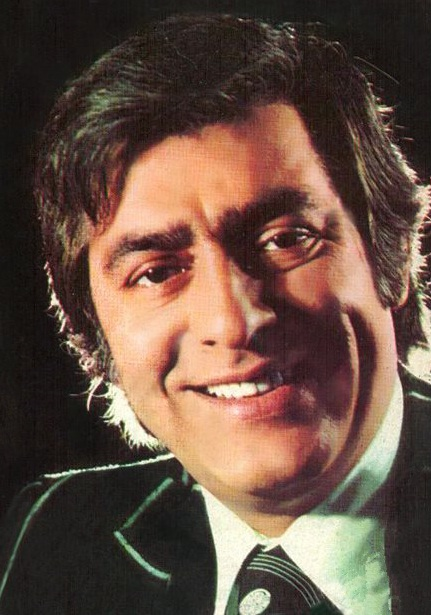
Mohammad Ali Fardin

- Films made before the Revolution, including:

Lor Girl, A Party in Hell, Qeysar, Dar Emtedade Shab, Amir Arsalan, and Ganj-e Qarun.

- Films about the victory of the Iranian Revolution of 1979 and the ensuing Iran–Iraq war and action filled with strong religious and national motifs.

Eagles, Barzakhiha, The Viper, Dadshah, Boycott, Duel, Taraj, Ekhrajiha, The Glass Agency, Kani Manga, Ofogh, Bashu, the Little Stranger, Leily Ba Man Ast, M as in Mother and The Night Bus.

- Post-revolutionary formulaic films starring popular actors. With 130 Iranian films looking for a screening each year, cinema managers tend to prefer crowd-pleasing comedies, romantic melodramas, and family comedies over the other genres. The Lizard, The Blue-Veiled, Ghermez, Leila, Outsiders, Char Changooli, Kolah Ghermezi and Pesar Khaleh, Kolah Ghermezi and Bache Naneh, Actor, Ejareh-Nesheenha, Shokaran, Dayere Zangi, Aquarium, Cease Fire, No Men Allowed, The Changed Man, Charlatan, The Kingdom of Solomon, Guidance Patrol, Killing Mad Dogs, A Separation and Hush! Girls Don't Scream were among the post-revolutionary films that gained the highest box office records.

For many years, the most visible face of Iranian commercial cinema was Mohammad Ali Fardin, who starred in a number of popular successful films. In the more conservative social climate of Iran after the Iranian Revolution of 1979, however, he came to be considered an embarrassment to Iranian national identity and his films — which depicted romance, alcohol, vulgarity, objectification of women, scantily-dressed men and women, nightclubs, and a vulgar lifestyle now condemned by the Islamic government — were banned. Although this would effectively prevent Fardin from making films for the remainder of his life, the ban did little to diminish his broad popularity with Iranian moviegoers: His funeral in Tehran was attended by 20,000 mourners. Before Fardin, one could argue, Iran simply did not have a commercial cinema.

During the war years, crime thrillers such as Senator, The Eagles, Boycott, The Tenants, and Kani Manga occupied the first position on the sales charts.

Officially, the Iranian government disdains American cinema: in 2007 President Ahmadinejad's media adviser told the Fars news agency, "We believe that the American cinema system is devoid of all culture and art and is only used as a device." However, numerous Western commercial films such as Jaws, The Illusionist, Passion of the Christ, House of Sand and Fog, Sky Captain and the World of Tomorrow, Sherlock Holmes, Alpha and Omega, Scarface, Casino Royale, The Mechanic, and The Aviator have been screened in Iranian cinemas and Iranian film festivals since the revolution. Despite great pride in the country's more than 100-year film history, Western cinema is enormously popular among Iran's young people, and practically every recent Hollywood film is available on CD, DVD, or video. State television has also broadcast more Western movies—partly because millions of Iranians have been switching to the use of banned satellite television equipment.

=== Iranian New Wave films ===
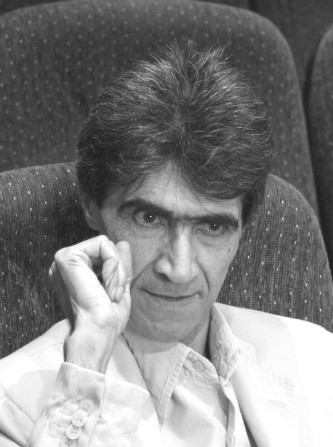
Nasser Taghvaee

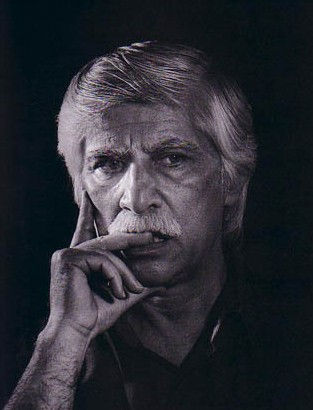
Bahram Bayzai, voted the best Persian filmmaker of all time in 2002

Iranian New Wave refers to a new movement in Iranian cinema. According to film critic Eric Henderson, the acclaimed documentary The House Is Black (خانه سیاه است) directed by Forough Farrokhzad (famous Iranian poet and director) paved the way for the Iranian New Wave. The movement started in 1964 with Hajir Darioush's second film Serpent's Skin, which was based on D.H. Lawrence's Lady Chatterley's Lover featuring Fakhri Khorvash and Jamshid Mashayekhi. Darioush's two important early social documentaries But Problems Arose in 1965, dealing with the cultural alienation of the Iranian youth, and Face 75, a critical look at the westernization of the rural culture, which was a prizewinner at the 1965 Berlin Film Festival, were also contributing significantly to the establishment of the New Wave.

In 1968, after the release of Shohare Ahoo Khanoom directed by Davoud Mollapour, and the 1969 release of The Cow directed by Darius Mehrjui followed by Masoud Kimiai's Qeysar, and Nasser Taqvai's Tranquility in the Presence of Others, the New Wave became well established as a prominent cultural, dynamic and intellectual trend. The Iranian viewer became discriminating, encouraging the new trend to prosper and develop. In the 1960s, there were 'New Wave' movements in the cinema of numerous countries. The pioneers of the Iranian New Wave were directors like Forough Farrokhzad, Sohrab Shahid Saless, Bahram Beizai, and Parviz Kimiavi. They made innovative art films with highly political and philosophical tones and poetic language. Subsequent films of this type have become known as the New Iranian cinema to distinguish them from their earlier roots. The most notable figures of the Iranian New Wave are Abbas Kiarostami, Jafar Panahi, Majid Majidi, Bahram Beizai, Darius Mehrjui, Mohsen Makhmalbaf, Khosrow Sinai, Sohrab Shahid-Saless, Parviz Kimiavi, Samira Makhmalbaf, Amir Naderi, and Abolfazl Jalili.

The factors leading to the rise of the New Wave in Iran were, in part, due to the intellectual and political movements of the time. A romantic climate was developing after the 19 August 1953 coup in the sphere of arts. Alongside this, a socially committed literature took shape in the 1950s and reached a peak in the 1960s, which may consider as the golden era of contemporary Persian literature.

Features of New Wave Iranian film, in particular the works of legendary Abbas Kiarostami, can be classified as postmodern.

Iranian New Wave films shared some characteristics with the European art films of the period, in particular Italian Neorealism. However, in her article 'Real Fictions', Rose Issa argues that Iranian films have a distinctively Iranian cinematic language

"that champions the poetry in everyday life and the ordinary person by blurring the boundaries between fiction and reality, feature film with documentary." She also argues that this unique approach has inspired European cinema directors to emulate this style, citing Michael Winterbottom's award winning In This World (2002) as an homage to contemporary Iranian cinema. Issa claims that "This new, humanistic aesthetic language, determined by the film-makers' individual and national identity, rather than the forces of globalism, has a strong creative dialogue not only on home ground but with audiences around the world."

In his book Close Up: Iranian Cinema, Past, Present, Future (2001) Hamid Dabashi describes modern Iranian cinema and the phenomenon of [Iranian] national cinema as a form of cultural modernity. According to him, replacing the cinema of Iran in the broader context of representation (or lack thereof) of Man in the islamic culture and of other historical Persian iconographic traditions, "the visual possibility of seeing the historical person (as opposed to the eternal Qur'anic man) on screen is arguably the single most important event allowing Iranians access to modernity."

While Beyzai and Taghvai represent the first generation and Karim-Masihi and Kiarostami represent the second generation of New wave filmmakers, the third generation is represented by Rafi Pitts, Bahman Ghobadi, Maziar Miri, Asghar Farhadi, Mani Haghighi, and Babak Payami, along with newly emerged filmmakers such as Saman Salur and Abdolreza Kahani.

=== Iranian popular art films ===
Parallel to the Iranian New Wave, with its neorealist and minimalist art cinema, there exists a so-called "popular art cinema" in Iran. Filmmakers who belong to this circle make films with a broader range of audience than the narrow spectrum of highly educated people who admire the New Wave, but believe that their movies are also artistically sound. Filmmakers such as Nasser Taghvaee and Ali Hatami are the best examples of this cinematic movement (some of these filmmakers also make new wave films e.g. Mum's Guest by Darius Mehrjui). The Demon and the Bald Hassan, Adam and Eve, The Fisherman's Story, City of Oranges, and Talisman are some of Hatami's works.

=== Iranian women's cinema ===
Following the rise of the Iranian New Wave, there are now record numbers of film school graduates in Iran and each year more than 20 new directors make their debut films, many of them women. In the last two decades, there have been a higher percentage of women directors in Iran than in most countries in the West. Samira Makhmalbaf directed her first film, The Apple, when she was only 17 years old and won the Cannes Jury Prize in 2000 for her following film The Blackboard.

The success and hard work of the pioneering Rakhshan Bani-Etemad is an example that many women directors in Iran were following much before Samira Makhmalbaf made the headlines and the current Tahmineh Milani, Niki Karimi. Internationally recognized figures in Iranian women's cinema are:

- Marjane Satrapi in 2008 Nominated Oscar Best Animated Feature Film of the Year Award. In 2006, became a member of the Cannes Film festival Jury. She is an Iranian contemporary graphic novelist, illustrator and author of the best selling "Persepolis". In 2007 she won the Cannes jury prize and won Best first Film César Award 2008 in and Audience Award Rotterdam International Film Festival 2008.
- Samira Makhmalbaf in 1998 won Sutherland Trophy BFI London Film Festival and International Critics prize Locarno Film Festival 1998, that Federico Fellini Medal UNESCO Paris 2000 and The Special Jury Prize in San Sebastián International Film Festival 2008, Prize of the Ecumenical Jury 2003, Giffoni Film Festival 2000 and 2000 Cannes Film Festival.
- Tahmineh Milani in 2001 won Best Artistic Contribution Cairo International Film Festival and three awards Best film, Best director, Best screenplay in Asia Pacific Film Festival 2006 and Best film award in Los Angeles Film Festival for The Unwanted Woman Movie 2005.

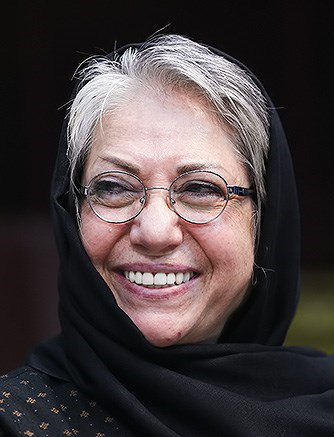
Rakhshan Bani Etemad

- Rakhshan Bani-Etemad in 1995 a winner Bronze Leopard Award for her film The Blue-Veiled at the Locarno Film Festival and winner Prince Claus Awards in 1998. Her 2001 film Under the Skin of the City was entered into the 23rd Moscow International Film Festival where it won the Special Golden St. George. The following year she was a member of the jury at the 24th Moscow International Film Festival, with the two major awards Netpac Award Karlovy Vary International Film Festival and Holden Award for the Best Script - Special Mention, Audience Award, CinemAvvenire Award Torino Film Festival. Her film Tales was selected to compete for the Golden Lion at the 71st Venice International Film Festival 2014.
- Manijeh Hekmat in 2003 for film Zendane zanan won Amnesty International DOEN Award Rotterdam International Film Festival and other he awards Ecumenical Jury Award Fribourg International Film Festival 2002. Hekmat in 2002 year it was nominated Gold hugo Chicago International Film Festival.
- Pouran Derakhshandeh in 2013 winner Best film award in London Iranian Film Festival and Crystal Simorgh Audience award Best film Farj Festival. in 1986 received Special Jury Award Giffoni Film Festival.
- Niki Karimi in 2006 Script won the International Film Festival Rotterdam Hubert Bals Fund and three awards at Vesoul International Film Festival of Asian Cinema.
- Marzieh Meshkini in 2000 won many awards, Silver Hugo Chicago International Film Festival and received FIPRESCI Prize Films from the South at Continuation winner New Currents Award Busan International Film Festival also won Best director Award in Thessaloniki Film Festival. Her following the success of their in Venice Film Festival received Open Prize also UNESCO Award and also Nominated Golden Lion.
- Hana Makhmalbaf in 2008 won two great Award Crystal Bear and Peace Film Award Berlin International Film Festival for film Buddha Collapsed Out of Shame. in 2003 Makhmalbaf It was winner Lina Mangiacapre Award Special Mention Venice Film Festival and Won two Special Jury Prize San Sebastián International Film Festival, Tokyo Filmex. Paolo Ungari UNICEF Prize Rome Film Festival is other big her award.
- Massy Tadjedin in 2010 won Golden Marc'Aurelio Award Rome Film Festival.

Besides women involved in screenwriting and filmmaking, numerous award-winning Iranian actresses with uniques styles and talents attract critic. The first Iranian actress who won an award for acting in a major film festival was Mary Apick. The most notable Iranian actresses are:

- Niki Karimi, Best Actor Award, Nantes Film Festival and San Sebastián International Film Festival 1999, Best Actress in Cairo Film Festival 2001, Crystal Simorgh for Best Actor Fajr International Film Festival 2003, Best Actress Taormina International Film Festival 1999 and Bastone Bianco Award Torino Film Festival 2005
- Leila Hatami Best Actor Award Locarno International Film Festival 2012, Montreal World Film Festival 2002 and Silver Berlin Bear 2011
- Fatemeh Motamed-Arya, Crystal Simorgh for the Best Actress, the 7th, 10th, 11th, and 12th Fajr International Film Festival Best Actress Vesoul Asian Film Festival 2010 and Best Actress Montreal World Film Festival 2011

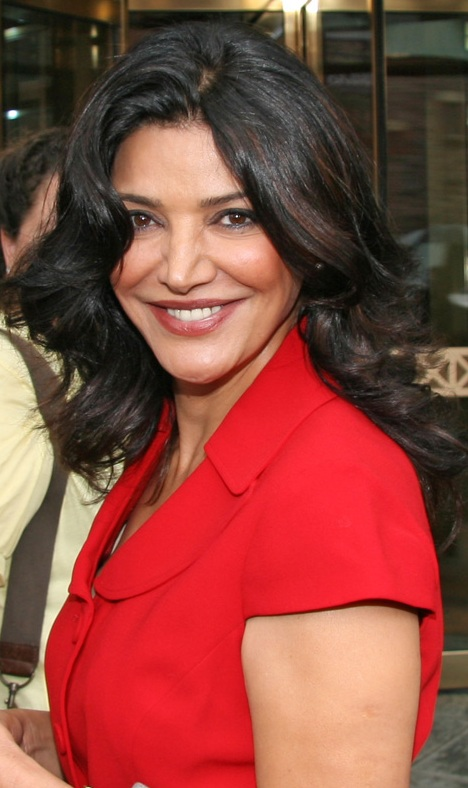
Shohreh Aghdashloo is the only Iranian to be nominated for an Academy Award in acting

- Shohreh Aghdashloo, First Iranian woman to be nominated for an Academy Award and Satellite Award for Best Actress – Motion Picture 2009 and Independent Spirit Award for Best Supporting Female 2003
- Pegah Ahangarani, Best Actress Award Cairo International Film Festival 1999 and Crystal Simorgh for Best Supporting Actor from Fajr International Film Festival 2013
- Taraneh Alidousti, Best Actor Award, Locarno International Film Festival 2002, Best Actress Osian's Cinefan Festival of Asian and Arab Cinema 2012 Best Actress Vesoul Asian Film Festival 2013 and Crystal Simorgh for best actress from Fajr International Film Festival 2002
- Mary Apick, Best Actress Award Moscow International Film Festival 1977
- Hedieh Tehrani, Crystal Simorgh for best Actress from Fajr International Film Festival 1998, 2006 and Best actress Pyongyang International Film Festival 2002
- Golshifteh Farahani, Best Actor from International Section of Fajr International Film Festival 1997 and Best Actress award from Nantes Three Continents Film Festival 2004
- Fereshteh Sadre Orafaee, Crystal Simorgh for Best Actor from Fajr International Film Festival 2005 and Best Actress Pasinetti Award Venice Film Festival 2000
- Bita Farrahi, Best Actress from Pyongyang International Film Festival 2009
- Soraya Ghasemi, Crystal Simorgh for Best Actor from Fajr International Film Festival 2001
- Mahtab Keramati, Crystal Simorgh for Best Supporting Actor from Fajr International Film Festival 2009 and for best actress from Batumi Art-House Film Festival 2013
- Susan Taslimi, Best Actor award, International Academy of Film Sweden 2000
- Farimah Farjami, Crystal Simorgh for Best Actor from Fajr International Film Festival 1991
- Azita Hajian, Crystal Simorgh for Best Actor from Fajr International Film Festival 1999
- Roya Teymourian, Crystal Simorgh for Best Supporting Actor from Fajr International Film Festival 2000
- Katayoun Riahi, Best Actress Cairo International Film Festival 2002
- Roya Nonahali, Best Actress from Amiens International Film Festival 1977 and Crystal Simorgh for Best Actor from Fajr International Film Festival 1989
- Mitra Hajjar, Crystal Simorgh for Best Actor from Fajr International Film Festival 2000
- Mahnaz Afshar, Crystal Simorgh for Best Supporting Actor from Fajr International Film Festival 2011
- Baran Kosari, Crystal Simorgh for Best Actor from Fajr International Film Festival 2007
- Hanieh Tavassoli, Crystal Simorgh for Best Actor from Fajr International Film Festival 2013
- Negar Javaherian, Best Actress, UNESCO Award from Asia Pacific Screen Awards 2013 and Crystal Simorgh for Best Actor from Fajr International Film Festival 2010
- Pantea Bahram, Best Actress from Mumbai International Film Festival 2011
- Hengameh Ghaziani, Crystal Simorgh for Best Actor from Fajr International Film Festival 2008, 2012 and Best Actress Love Is Folly International Film Festival 2012

Furthermore, women's resistance against the symbolic order in the society has been demonstrated in different movies such as The Little Rusty Brains by Houman Seyedi

=== Iranian war films ===
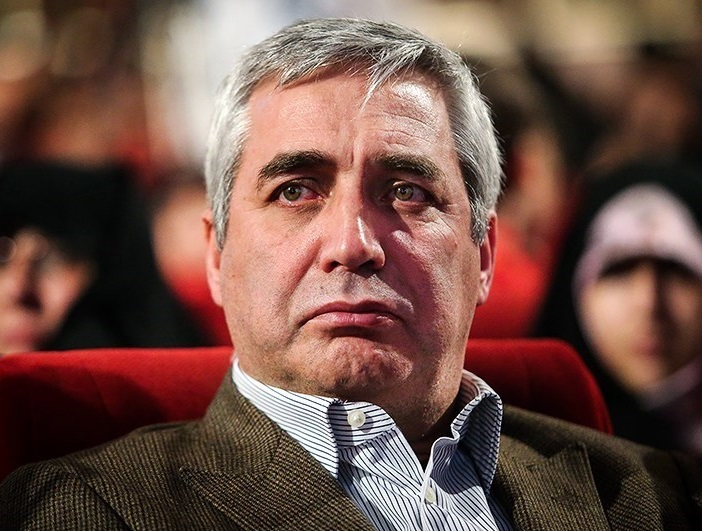
Ebrahim Hatamikia

War cinema in Iran was born simultaneously with the beginning of Iran–Iraq War. However, it took many years until it found its way and identity by defining characteristics of Iranian war cinema. In the Alleys of Love (1990), by Khosrow Sinai, shows the most poematic view on the Iran Iraq war and still after years, is one of the leading films about this historical event from a humanistic aspect, although unlike other Iranian war cinema which are fully supported by the Iranian government this film was made with numerous difficulties. In the past decades, the Iranian film industry has produced many war films. In the Iranian war film genre, war has often been portrayed as glorious and "holy", bringing out the good in the protagonist and pandering to nationalist sentiments with propagandistic messaging. Tears of Cold and Duel were two films that have gone beyond the traditional view of war. Many renowned directors were involved in developing Iranian war cinema:

- Morteza Avini (Famous TV Documentary: Ravayat-e Fath)
- Shahriar Bahrani (Famous film: The Attack on H3)
- Mohammad Bozorgnia (Famous film: Jang-e naftkesh-ha)
- Ahmad Reza Darvish (Famous film: Duel)
- Seifollah Dad (Famous film: Kani Manga)
- Samuel Khachikian (Famous film: Eagles)
- Ebrahim Hatamikia (Famous films: Mohajer, Az Karkheh ta Rhein, Booy-E Pirahan-E Yusef, The Glass Agency and Che (2014 film))
- Mohsen Makhmalbaf (Famous film: The Marriage of the Blessed)
- Rasoul Mollagholipour (Famous films: Safar be Chazabeh & Mim Mesle Madar)
- Ali Shah Hatami (Famous film: Akharin Shenasaee)
- Kamal Tabrizi (Famous films: Dar Maslakh-e Eshgh & Leily Ba Man Ast)
- Kiumars Pourahmad (Famous film: The Night Bus)
- Behzad Behzadpour (Famous film: Khodahafez Rafigh)

Other films famous and popular Iran Iraq War: Goodbye Life directed by Ensieh Shah-Hosseini, Heeva, Mazrae-ye pedari and Safar be Chazabeh directed by Rasoul Mollagholipour, Kirkuk Operation, Hoor on Fire and Kani Manga directed by Seifollah Dad. Che, Az Karkheh ta Rhein, Mohajer and The Red Ribbon directed by Ebrahim Hatamikia. Big Drum Under Left Foot directed by Kazem Masoumi. Gilaneh directed by Rakhshan Bani-E'temad. The Day Third directed by Mohammad Hossein Latifi. The Reward of Silence directed by Maziar Miri. Sizdah 59 directed by Saman Salur. The Queen directed by Mohammad Ali Bashe Ahangar. Mardi shabih-e baran directed by Saeed Soheili. Bashu, the Little Stranger directed by Bahram Beyzai. Snake Fang directed by Masoud Kimiai and Hoor dar Atash directed by Azizollah Hamidnezhad.

=== Iranian animations ===
There are some evidences suggesting that Ancient Iranians made animations. An animated piece on an earthen goblet made 5000 years ago was found in Burnt City in Sistan-Baluchistan province, southeastern Iran. The artist has portrayed a goat that jumps toward a tree and eats its leaves.

The first Tehran International Animation Festival was held in the year 1999, four decades after the time the production of first animation films in Iran. The Second Tehran International Animation Festival was held in February 2001. Apart from Iranian films, animations from 35 foreign countries participated in the festival.

Notable Iranian animation filmmakers include:

- Noureddin Zarrin-Kelk
- Ali Akbar Sadeghi

=== Children and youth films ===
Although early attempts also existed, the Iranian children and youth cinema came of age with acclaimed director Mohammad Ali Talebi (b. 1958). He started his career in the 1980s and achieved success beyond Iran with Bag of Rice (1997) and Willow and Wind (2000), whose script was written by Abbas Kiarostami.

Talebi believed that producing movies for children and teenagers was a service to "the most fragile and vulnerable of the Iranian society." In the 2010s, he became somewhat skeptical about the future of children and youth cinema in Iran, and in 2018 moved to Slovakia.

=== Timeline of Iranian films ===
- Pre 1960
- 1960s
- 1970s
- 1980s
- 1990s
- 2000s
- 2010s
- 2020s

== Influence of Iranians on others' New Wave films ==
During the first half of the 20th century, France was the major destination for Iranian students who wished to study abroad. Iranian ambassador to the United Nations Fereydoun Hoveyda was one of them. Fereydoun Hoveyda played a major role in French cultural scene and especially in the field of Cinema, for he was the protégé of François Truffaut whom he befriended and with whom he helped create the well-known film magazine Les Cahiers du Cinéma that spearheaded the French Nouvelle Vague or New Wave Cinema. He also worked closely with Italian film director Roberto Rossellini on several film scripts during that period. Fereydoun Hoveyda was not the only Iranian of his generation to play an active role in promoting the French Cinéma d'Auteur. Youssef Ishaghpour is another example.

Another Iranian figure in French New Wave was Shusha Guppy a singer, writer and filmmaker who was Jacques Prévert's girlfriend. However, the most important contribution to the French New Wave cinema is that of Serge Rezvani an Iranian poet born in Tehran in 1928. He played a major role as music composer of both François Truffaut Jules et Jim and Jean-Luc Godard Pierrot le Fou, considered as landmarks of French New Wave Cinema. Farah Diba studied at the Beaux Arts and became the focus of attention and the French press was to see her as the new Persian Cinderella. Farah Diba was one of the rare foreign dignitaries to become a permanent member of the French Académie des Beaux-Arts.

Iranian Robert Hossein (son of legendary musician Aminollah Hossein) started his acting career with his French Armenian friend Chahnour Varinag Aznavourian (known as the famed crooner Charles Aznavour) in the mid fifties essentially type cast as "Mr. Tough Guy". However he got international acclaim in the early Sixties particularly in Europe, Russia and Asia as the mysterious "Jeoffrey, Comte de Peyrac" lover of the lovely Michèle Mercier in the soft erotic-adventure film series of Angélique Marquise des Anges. In the seventies and eighties he was to play opposite Jean-Paul Belmondo in police thrillers like The Professional. Hossein became known for being a talented theater director and his taste for popular historical vehicles involving large sets and numerous actors.

After the resignation of French president Charles de Gaulle, Iranian Anicée Shahmanesh became known under the screen name Anicée Alvina, playing a French girl in a British film hit called Friends, the music score of which propelled British pop star Elton John. She was also to take on a courageous lesbian role in the screen adaptation of Françoise Mallet-Joris' novel Le Rempart des Béguines.

Two major documentaries were produced in these years by respectively Agnès Varda and the duo Claude Lelouch and Claude Pinoteau:

- Agnès Varda, first to be discovered to young actor Gérard Depardieu in her 1970 film Nausicaa, directed a love story set in Isfahan (1976) between a French woman (Valérie Mairesse) visiting Iran as a tourist and her guide an Iranian Man (Ali Raffi). The film was entitled Plaisir D'Amour en Iran. The romantic film was shot on location in The Masjed Shah.
- Claude Pinoteau and Claude Lelouch on the other hand shot their documentary just after the Persepolis Celebrations in 1971. They decided to address the urban transformations and cultural emancipation that the country was subject to by the early seventies.

Several Iranian expats such as Philippe Khorsand or Persian play writer/actor Yasmina Reza have also gained notice in recent years. The latter is particularly known for her highly intellectual introspection in such plays like Art (for which Sean Connery bought the film rights, advised by his French wife).

== Music in Iranian cinema ==
Although Iranian composers usually have their own special style and music structure, they all share one thing: melodic, lively rhythms. That might be because they often begin with folkloric songs and shift to film music. In the past few decades, a few composers have emerged in the Iranian cinema with highly appraised works. Composers like Hormoz Farhat, Morteza Hannaneh, Fariborz Lachini, Ahmad Pejman, Majid Entezami, Babak Bayat, Karen Homayounfar, Naser Cheshmazar and Hossein Alizadeh were some of the most successful score composers for Iranian films in the past decades.

== Iranian international film festivals ==
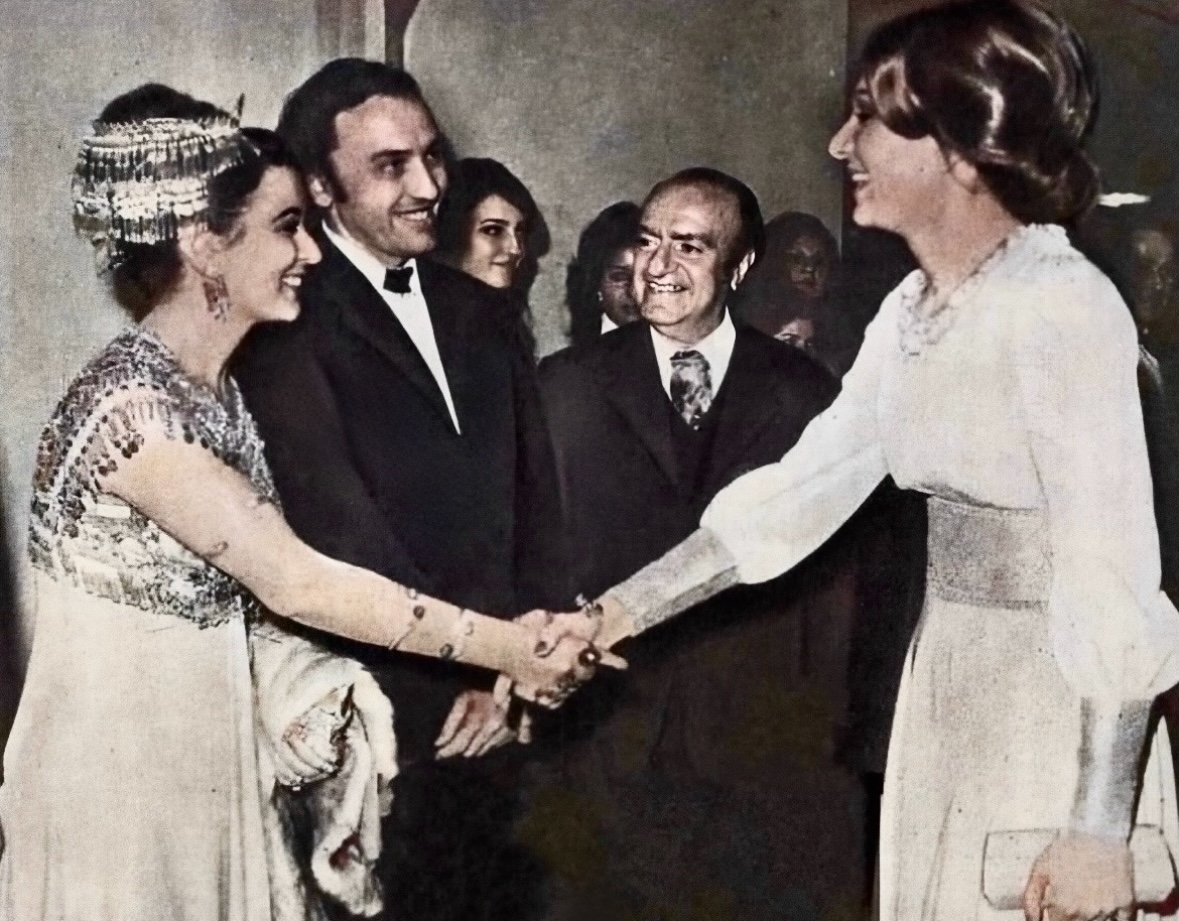
Queen Farah Pahlavi shaking hands with the Egyptian actress Soad Hosny and Egyptian writer Youssef Francis in the second edition of the Tehran International Film Festival, 1973.

Film festivals have a long history in Iran that goes back to the 1950s. The first Tehran International Film Festival opened in April 1973. Although the festival never reached the level of Cannes and Venice, it managed to become well known as a class A festival. It was a highly reputable festival and many well-known filmmakers took part. Great filmmakers such as Francesco Rosi, Michelangelo Antonioni Grigori Kozintsev, Elizabeth Taylor, Pietro Germi, Nikita Mikhalkov, Krzysztof Zanussi, and Martin Ritt won the festival's awards.

=== Fajr Film Festival ===
The Fajr International Film Festival has taken place since 1983. It was intended to be as magnificent and spectacular as possible from its very onset. It had a background as powerful as that of the Tehran International Film Festival and wanted to remain on the same track. Although the Fajr Film Festival is not yet classed among the top film festivals, it has been successful in making policies and setting examples for the future of Iranian cinema. In its early years it had a competition section for professional as well as amateur film (8 mm, 16 mm). Since 1990, there has been an international along with the national competition. The festival also features a competition for advertisement items like posters, stills and trailers. In 2005, the festival added competitions for Asian as well as spiritual films. The top prize is called Crystal Simorgh.

=== Cinéma Vérité ===
Cinéma Vérité is a documentary film festival held in Tehran in December each year. The 2024 festival is its 18th edition.

=== NAM Filmmakers' Meeting ===
Iran is the current president of the Non-Aligned Movement and hosted the 16th NAM summit between 26 and 31 August 2012, after which the presidency was handed to Ahmadinejad on 1 September. The latest move by the NAM Chairman has been to organise a NAM filmmakers' meeting in order to discuss the establishment of a NAM filmmakers' union. The meeting is to be held in February 2013, concurrently with the 31st Fajr International Film Festival in Tehran.

=== International Film Festival for Children and Youth ===
The International Film Festival for Children and Youth has taken place since 1985. In its first three years, it was part of the Fajr Film Festival. From 1988 to 1989, it was located in Tehran, and since then in Isfahan, except for 1996 when it was held in Kerman. The festival features international and national film and video competitions. The top prize is called Golden Butterfly.

=== House of Cinema Ceremony ===
On September 12, the national day of Iranian cinema, a celebration is held annually by the House of Cinema. In the 2006 event, Akira Kurosawa was honored.

=== Noor Iranian Film Festival ===
Founded in 2007, the Noor Iranian Film Festival is held annually in Los Angeles, California.

=== Iranian Film Festival - San Francisco ===
Iranian Film Festival - San Francisco (IFF), the first independent Iranian film festival outside of Iran, launched in 2008, is an annual event showcasing independent feature and short films made by or about Iranians from around the world.

=== London Iranian Film Festival ===
is an annual, independent film festival held in London, United Kingdom.

=== Roshd International Film Festival ===
Roshd International Film Festival was first staged in 1963 by the Bureau of Audio-visual Activities of the Ministry of Education of Iran. It is centered on the films with educational and pedagogical themes and is staged every year by the Supplying Educational Media Center, a sub-branch of the Ministry of Education of the I.R.Iran. The Festival seeks the main objectives of identifying and selecting the best educational and pedagogical films in order to introduce them to the educational systems.

=== Persian International Film Festival ===
Persian International Film Festival is an independent cultural film event, that brings together screen stories of diverse global Persian communities. Founded in 2012 by Amin Palangi, it is Located in Sydney, Australia.

=== Iranian Film Festival Zurich ===
Iranian Film Festival of Zürich (IFFZ), is being organized to fulfill the cultural gap between Iranians and Swiss along with the foreigners living in Switzerland.

=== Festival of Iranian Films in Prague (ÍRÁN:CI) ===
The Festival of Iranian Films in Prague, later known as ÍRÁN:CI, was a film festival held in Prague and Brno in the Czech Republic from 2012. From 2025 its focus has widened to include other regions of the world, and it is known as KOM:PAS.

=== Iranian Film Festival Cologne ===
Iranian film Festival is programmed to be held in the city of Cologne in Germany to represent the country Cinema industry. House of Cinema in collaboration with Cologne Municipality paved the way for holding the festival.

=== The Festival Cinema of Iran ===
Iranian film festival (Cinéma d'Iran) is scheduled to kick off on June 26 and will run until July 2, 2013 in Paris.

=== Houston Iranian Film Festival ===
The Houston Iranian Film Festival showcases the best in new cinema from Iran. Iranian film varied by jury is, In Houston, America will be held.

=== Tehran International Animation Festival ===
International Animation Festival, held in Tehran.

=== Other festivals ===
Other valid festivals have included: Iran International Documentary Film Festival, Moqavemat International Film Festival, International Film Festival 100, International Urban Film Festival, International Parvin Etesami Film Festival, Jasmine International Film Festival (TJIFF), Celebration of Iran Cinematic Critics and Writers, Rouyesh Religious Short Film Festival, Iranian Youth Cinema Society, Edinburgh Iranian Festival, Iranian Film Festival (IFF), Iranian Film Festival Chandigarh, Varesh Short Film Festival, Tehran International Video Film Festival, International Festival of Independent Filmmakers, and Canada's Iranian Film Festival.

== International recognition of Iranian cinema ==
Here is a list of Grand prizes awarded to Iranian cinema by the most prestigious film festivals:

=== Cannes ===
First presence of Iranian cinema in Cannes dates back to 1991 when in the alleys of love by Khosrow Sinai and then 1992 when Life and nothing more by Abbas Kiarostami represented Iran in the festival.

- 1995: Caméra d'Or (Golden Camera): Jafar Panahi
- 1997: Palme d'Or (Golden Palm): Abbas Kiarostami
- 2000: Caméra d'Or (Golden Camera): Hassan Yektapanah, Bahman Ghobadi
- 2000: Prix du Jury (Jury Prize): Samira Makhmalbaf
- 2001: Prize of the Ecumenical Jury: Mohsen Makhmalbaf
- 2003: Prix du Jury (Jury prize): Samira Makhmalbaf
- 2003: Prix Un Certain Regard: Jafar Panahi
- 2003: Prize of the Ecumenical Jury: Mohsen Makhmalbaf
- 2004: Caméra d'Or (Golden Camera): Mohsen Amiryoussefi
- 2007: Prix du Jury (Jury prize): Marjane Satrapi
- 2009: Prix Un Certain Regard: Bahman Ghobadi
- 2011: Prix Un Certain Regard: Mohammad Rasoulof
- 2011: François Chalais Award - Special Mention: Mohammad Rasoulov
- 2013: Prix Un Certain Regard: Mohammad Rasoulof
- 2013: Prize of the Ecumenical Jury: Asghar Farhadi
- 2015: Un Certain Regard - Avenir Prize: Ida Panahandeh
- 2016: Prix du scénario (Best Screenplay): Asghar Farhadi
- 2016: Prix d'interprétation masculine (Best Actor): Shahab Hosseini
- 2017: Un Certain Regard Award: Mohammad Rasoulof
- 2018: Prix du scénario (Best Screenplay): Jafar Panahi
- 2021: Grand prix (Grand Prix): Asghar Farhadi
- 2022: Prix d'interprétation féminine (Best Actress): Zar Amir Ebrahimi
- 2024: Prix Spécial (Special Prize): Mohammad Rasoulof
- 2025: Palme d'Or (Golden Palm): Jafar Panahi
- 2026: Golden Eye (Best documentary film):Pegah Ahangarani

=== Academy Awards (Oscars) ===
- 1969: Ray Aghayan: Best Costume Design Nomination for Gaily, Gaily
- 1996: Habib Zargarpour: Best Visual Effects Nomination for Twister
- 1996: Darius Khondji: Best Cinematography Nomination for Evita
- 1997: Hossein Amini: Best Adapted Screenplay Nomination for The Wings of the Dove
- 1998: Majid Majidi: Best Foreign Language Film Nomination for Children of Heaven
- 1999: Mehdi Norowzian: Best Live Action Short Film Award for Killing Joe
- 2000: Habib Zargarpour: Best Visual Effects Nomination for The Perfect Storm
- 2003: Shohreh Aghdashloo: Best Supporting Actress Nomination for House of Sand and Fog
- 2006: Kami Asgar: Best Sound Editing Nomination for Apocalypto
- 2007: Marjane Satrapi: Best Animated Feature Nomination for Persepolis
- 2011: Asghar Farhadi: Best Original Screenplay Nomination for A Separation
- 2011: Asghar Farhadi: Best Foreign Language Film Award for A Separation
- 2014: Talkhon Hamzavi: Best Live Action Short Film Award for Parvaneh
- 2016: Asghar Farhadi: Best Foreign Language Film Award for The Salesman
- 2022: Seyed Mohsen Pourmohseni Shakib: Student Academy Awards Nomination for The Boot
- 2024: Yegane Moghaddam: Best Animated Short Film Nomination for Our Uniform
- 2025: Mohammad Rasoulof: Best Foreign Language Film Nomination for The Seed of the Sacred Fig (Submitted by Germany)
- 2025: Shirin Sohani and Hossein Molayemi: Best Animated Short Film award for In the Shadow of the Cypress
- 2026: Jafar Panahi: Best Foreign Language Film nomination for It Was Just an Accident (Submitted by France)
- 2026: Jafar Panahi: Best Original Screenplay nomination for It Was Just an Accident
- 2026: Sara Khaki and Mohammadreza Eyni: Best Documentary nomination for Cutting Through Rocks (the first feature documentary from Iran to be nominated for an Oscar in the history of the Academy awards)

=== Golden Globe Awards ===
- 2011: Asghar Farhadi (Award) Best Foreign Language Film, A Separation
- 2013: Asghar Farhadi (Nominated) Best Foreign Language Film, The Past
- 2016: Asghar Farhadi (Nominated) Best Foreign Language Film, The Salesman
- 2021: Asghar Farhadi (Nominated) Best Foreign Language Film, A Hero
- 2025: Mohammad Rasoulof (Nominated) Best Foreign Language Film, The Seed of the Sacred Fig
- 2026: Jafar Panahi (Nominated) Best Foreign Language Film, It Was Just an Accident
- 2026: Jafar Panahi (Nominated) Best Director, It Was Just an Accident
- 2026: Jafar Panahi (Nominated) Best Screenplay, It Was Just an Accident
- 2026: Jafar Panahi (Nominated) Best Best Motion Picture – Drama, It Was Just an Accident

=== Venice ===
- Golden Lion: Jafar Panahi (2000)
- Silver Lion for the Best Director: : Babak Payami (2001)

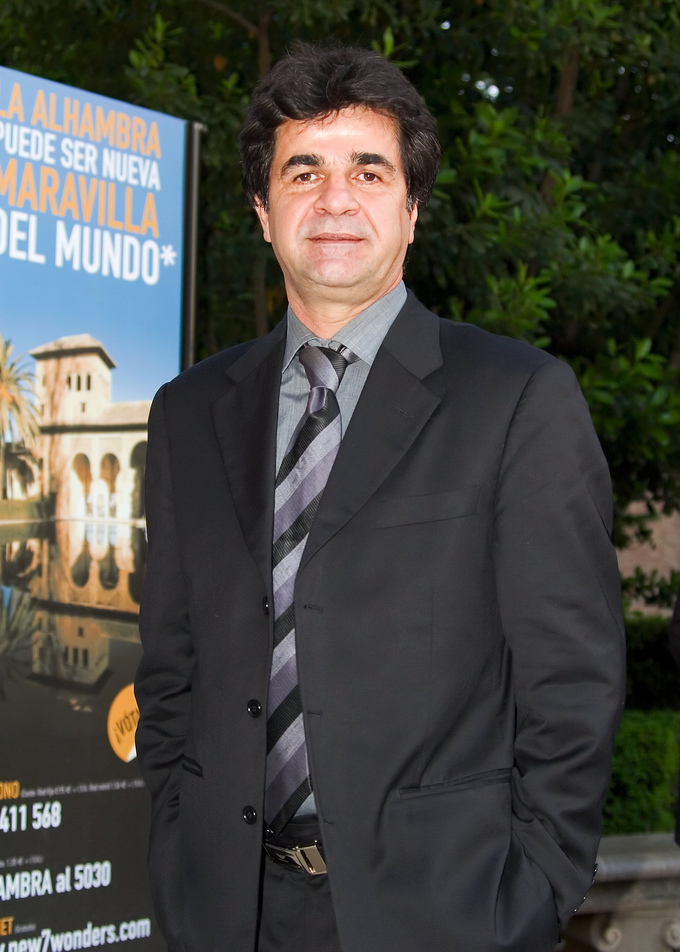
Jafar Panahi is the only Iranian director who has won Golden Lion at Venice Film Festival

- Special Jury Prize: Ana Lily Amirpour (2016)
- Golden Osella for the Best Director: Abolfazl Jalili (1995), Shirin Neshat (2009)
- Best Screenplay Award: Rakhshan Bani Etemad (2014)
- FIPRESCI Prize: Dariush Mehrjui (1971), Abbas Kiarostami (1999), Ramin Bahrani (2008)
- Special Jury Prize: Abbas Kiarostami (1999), Abdolreza Kahani (2009)
- The Special Orizzonti Jury Prize: Shahram Mokri (2013)
- The Orizzonti Award for Best Director: Vahid Jalilvand (2017)
- The Orizzonti Award for Best Actor: Navid Mohammadzadeh (2017)
- SIGNIS Award - Honorable Mention: Amir Naderi (2008)
- OCIC Award : Babak Payami (2001)
- Netpac Award: Babak Payami (2001)
- UNICEF Award: Babak Payami (2001)
- Pasinetti Award: Babak Payami (2001)
- Digital Cinema Award: Mania Akbari (2004)
- Lina Mangiacapre Award - Special Mention: Hana Makhmalbaf (2003)
- Open Prize: Marzieh Meshkini (2004)
- UNESCO Award: Marzieh Meshkini (2000)
- Isvema Award: Marzieh Meshkini (2000)
- CinemAvvenire Award: Abbas Kiarostami (1999), Marzieh Meshkini (2000)

=== Sundance ===
- World Cinema Dramatic Best Director: Alireza Ghasemi, Raha Amirfazli (2024)
- World Cinema Dramatic Grand Jury Prize: Massoud Bakhshi (2020)
- World Cinema Feature Dicumentary Grand Jury Award: Mohammadreza Eyni and Sara Khaki.

=== Berlin ===
- Golden Bear: Asghar Farhadi (2011), Jafar Panahi (2015), Mohammad Rasoulof (2020)
- Silver Bear: Parviz Kimiavi (1976)
- Silver Bear for Best Director: Asghar Farhadi (2009)
- Silver Bear for Best Script: Jafar Panahi (2013)
- Silver Bear for Best Actor: Reza Naji (2008), A Separation (Total Actors 2011)
- Silver Bear for Best Actress: A Separation (Total Actresses 2011)
- Jury Grand Prix: Jafar Panahi (2006)
- Special Mention: Masoud Kimiai (1991)
- FIPRESCI Prize: Sohrab Shahid Saless (1974 & 1975)
- Interfilm Award: Dariush Mehrjui (1972), Sohrab Shahid Saless (1974 & 1975)
- OCIC Award: Dariush Mehrjui (1969), Sohrab Shahid Saless (1974 & 1975)
- Don Quixote Award - Special Mention: Dariush Mehrjui (1999)
- Crystal Bear Generation Kplus - Best Feature Film: Hana Makhmalbaf (2008)
- Peace Film Award: Hana Makhmalbaf (2008)
- Netpac Award: Mani Haghighi (2012)
- Teddy Award for the Best Short Film: Maryam Keshavarz (
- Crystal Bear for the Best Short Film {Dena Rassam. Farhad Delaram} (2019)

=== Locarno ===
The first film from Iranian cinema that won a prize in Locarno festival was Where Is the Friend's Home? directed by Abbas Kiarostami (1989).

- Golden Leopard: Jafar Panahi (1997), Ebrahim Forouzesh (1994)
- Silver Leopard: Kianoush Ayari (1994), Abolfazl Jalili (1998), Hassan Yektapanah (2004)
- Bronze Leopard: Nasser Taghvai (1988), Abbas Kiarostami (1989)
- Special Jury Prize: Abolfazl Jalili (2001), Rasul Sadrameli (2002), Saman Salur (2006)
- NETPAC Prize: Hassan Yektapanah (2004)
- Special Mention, Official Jury: Samira Makhmalbaf (1996)
- Special mention, FIBRESCI jury: Abbas Kiarostami (1989), Samira Makhmalbaf (1998)
- Special Mention: Alireza Amini (2003)
- Ecumenical Jury special Mention: Sohrab Shahid Saless (1976), Abbas Kiarostami (1989)

=== London ===
- FIPRESCI Prize: Babak Payami (2001)
- FIPRESCI International Critics Prize: Ramin Bahrani (2005)
- FIPRESCI Prize - Special Mention: Abolfazl Jalili (1998), Babak Payami (2001)
- Sutherland Trophy: Marjane Satrapi (2007), Samira Makhmalbaf (1998)
- Grierson Award for the Best Documentary: Mehrdad Oskouei (2016)

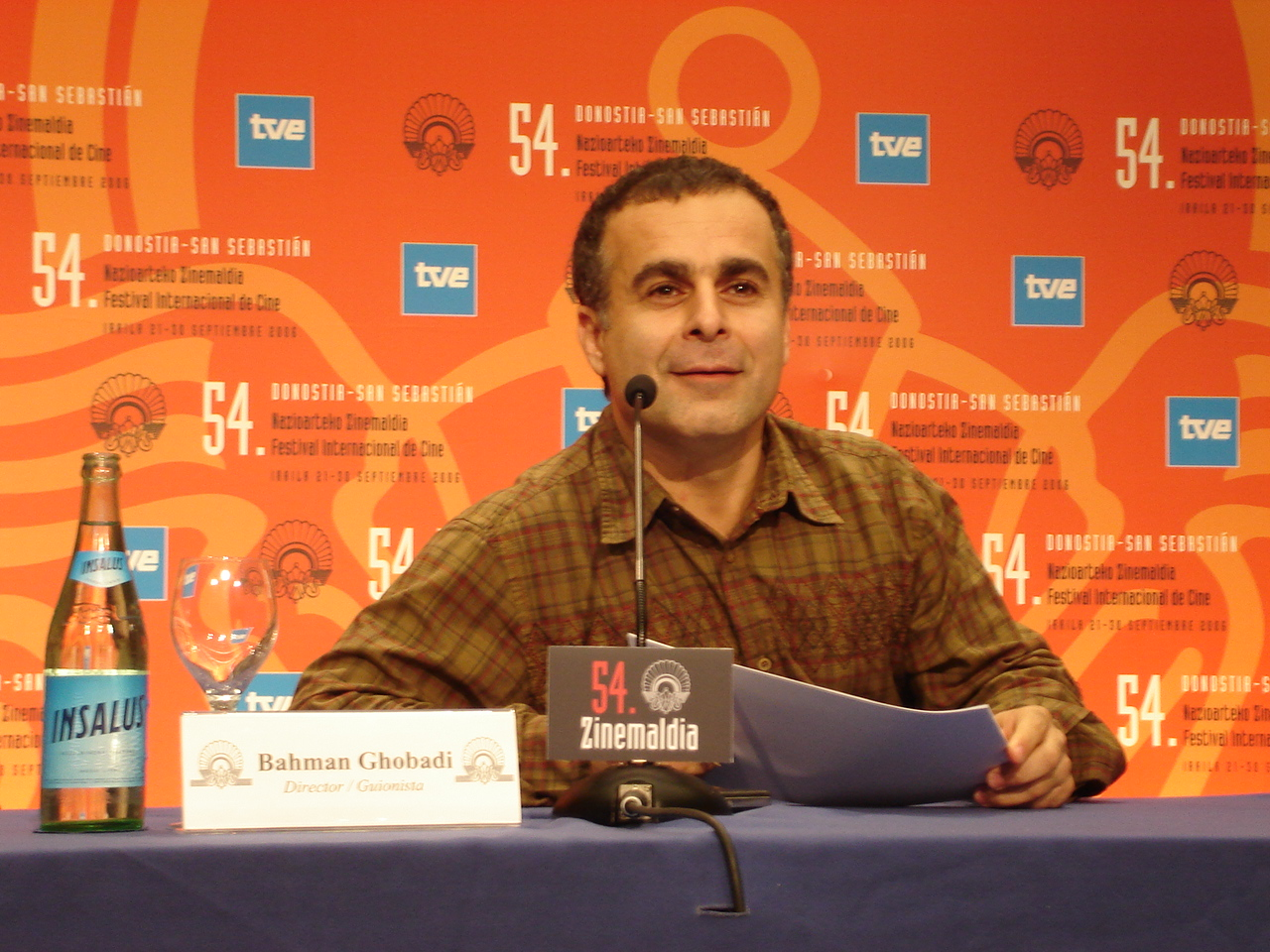
Bahman Ghobadi has won two Golden Shell awards at San Sebastian Film Festival

=== San Sebastian ===
- Golden Shell: Dariush Mehrjui (1993), Bahman Ghobadi (2004 & 2006)
- Silver Shell: Niki Karimi (1993), Abolfazl Jalili (1998)
- Special Jury Prize: Majid Majidi (1996), Samira Makhmalbaf (2008)
- FIPRESCI Award: Bahman Ghobadi (2006)
- Jury Prize for Best Cinematography: Touraj Aslani (2012).
- Special Prize of the Jury: Hana Makhmalbaf (2007)
- TVE Otra Mirada Award: Hana Makhmalbaf (2007)

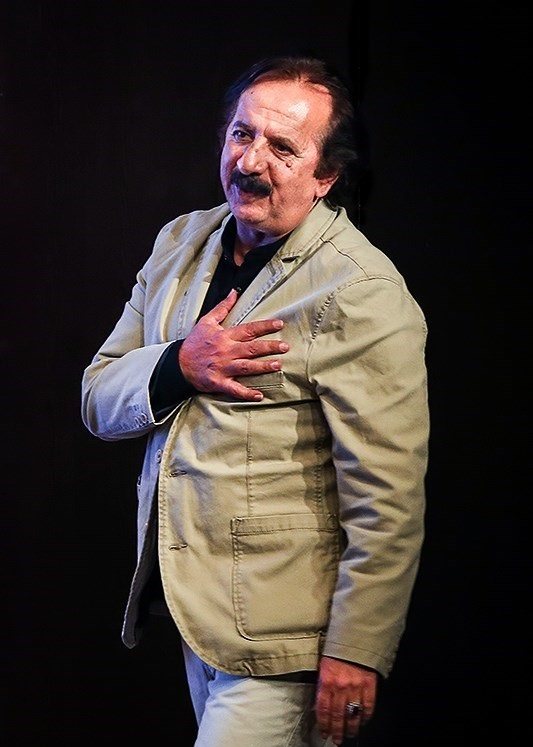
Majid Majidi has won three Grand Prix awards at Montreal World Film Festival

=== Montreal ===
- Grand Prix: Majid Majidi (1997, 1999 & 2001)
- Best Actress: Leila Hatami (2002), Fatemeh Motamed-Arya (2011)
- Golden Zenith for Best Asian Film : Kamal Tabrizi (2004)

=== Karlovy Vary ===
- Special Jury Prize: Mohsen Makhmalbaf (1992)
- Best Actor: Hamid Farrokhnezhad (2000)
- Special Jury Prize: Abdolreza Kahani (2009)
- Best Actress: Leila Hatami (2012)
- FIPRESCI Prize: Ali Mosaffa (2012)
- Don Quijote Award - Special Mention: Khosrow Sinai (2000), Alireza Amini (2004)

=== Mar del Plata ===
- Golden Astor: Mahmoud Kalari (1998)
- Special Jury Award: Mohsen Amiryoussefi (2005)
- Best Actress: Negar Javaherian (2014)
- Special Mention: Kambozia Partovi (2006), Hossein Shahabi (2013)

=== Thessaloniki ===
- Golden Alexander: Mohsen Amiryoussefi (2004)
- Golden Alexander: Abdolreza Kahani (2008)
- Silver Alexander: Mona Zandi Haghighi (2006)
- Best Director: Marzieh Meshkini (2000)

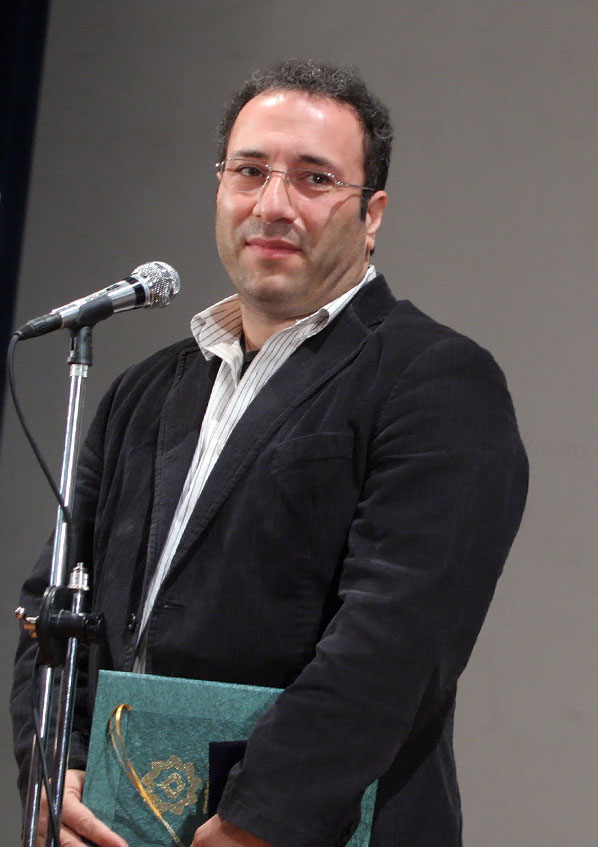
Reza Mirkarimi has won two Golden George awards at Moscow Film Festival

- Special Jury Award: Vahid Jalilvand (2017)
- Special Mention: Hossein Shahabi (2013)
- Audience Award: Mohsen Amiryoussefi (2004)
- Special Artistic Achievement: Alireza Amini (2003)

=== Moscow ===
- Golden George: Reza Mirkarimi (2008 & 2016)
- Special Golden St.George: Rakhshan Bani Etemad (2001)
- Special Jury Prize: Vahid Mousaian (2002)
- Silver George for the best actor: Faramarz Gharibian (2003), Hamid Farrokhnezhad (2005), Farhad Aslani (2016)
- Best Actress: Mary Apick (1977), Soha Niasti (2019)
- Russian Critics Jury's Prize: Reza Mirkarimi (2008)

=== Chicago ===
- Gold Hugo: Jafar Panahi (2003), Asghar Farhadi (2006), Mohsen Makhmalbaf (2014)
- Silver Hugo: Abbas Kiarostami (1994)
- Special Jury Prize: Bahman Ghobadi (2000) & (2004), Asghar Farhadi (2016)
- Best Screenplay: Mohammad Rasoulof (2017)
- Best Actor: Ezzatollah Entezami (1971)
- Silver Hugo for the Best First Film: Marzieh Meshkini (2000)
- Silver Hugo of the Docufest Competition: Arash T. Riahi (2006).
- Gold Hugo for Best Documentary :Arash Lahooti (2013)

=== Shanghai ===
- Golden Goblet for the Best Film: Reza Mirkarimi (2019)
- Golden Goblet for the Best Director: Reza Mirkarimi (2019)
- Golden Goblet for the Best Actor: Hamed Behdad (2019)
- Golden Goblet for the Best Film: Khosro Masumi (2004 & 2012)
- Grand Jury Prize: Mostafa Taghizadeh (2017)
- Golden Goblet for the Best Actress: Sareh Bayat (2017)

=== Warsaw ===
- Grand Prix: Asghar Farhadi (2004), Parviz Shahbazi (2016)
- Audience Award: Majid Majidi (1999)
- Special Jury Award: Asghar Farhadi (2011)
- NETPAC Award: Houman Seyyedi (2014)
- NETPAC Award: Mohammadreza Eyni and Sara Khaki (2025) for Cutting Through Rocks
- Free Spirit Audince Award: Mohammadreza Eyni and Sara khaki (2025) for Cutting Through Rocks

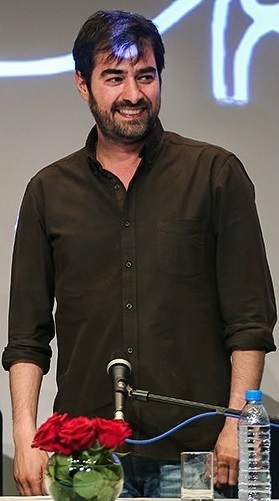
Shahab Hosseini has won two major acting awards at 69th Cannes Film Festival and 61st Berlin International Film Festival (as a member of the actors ensemble)

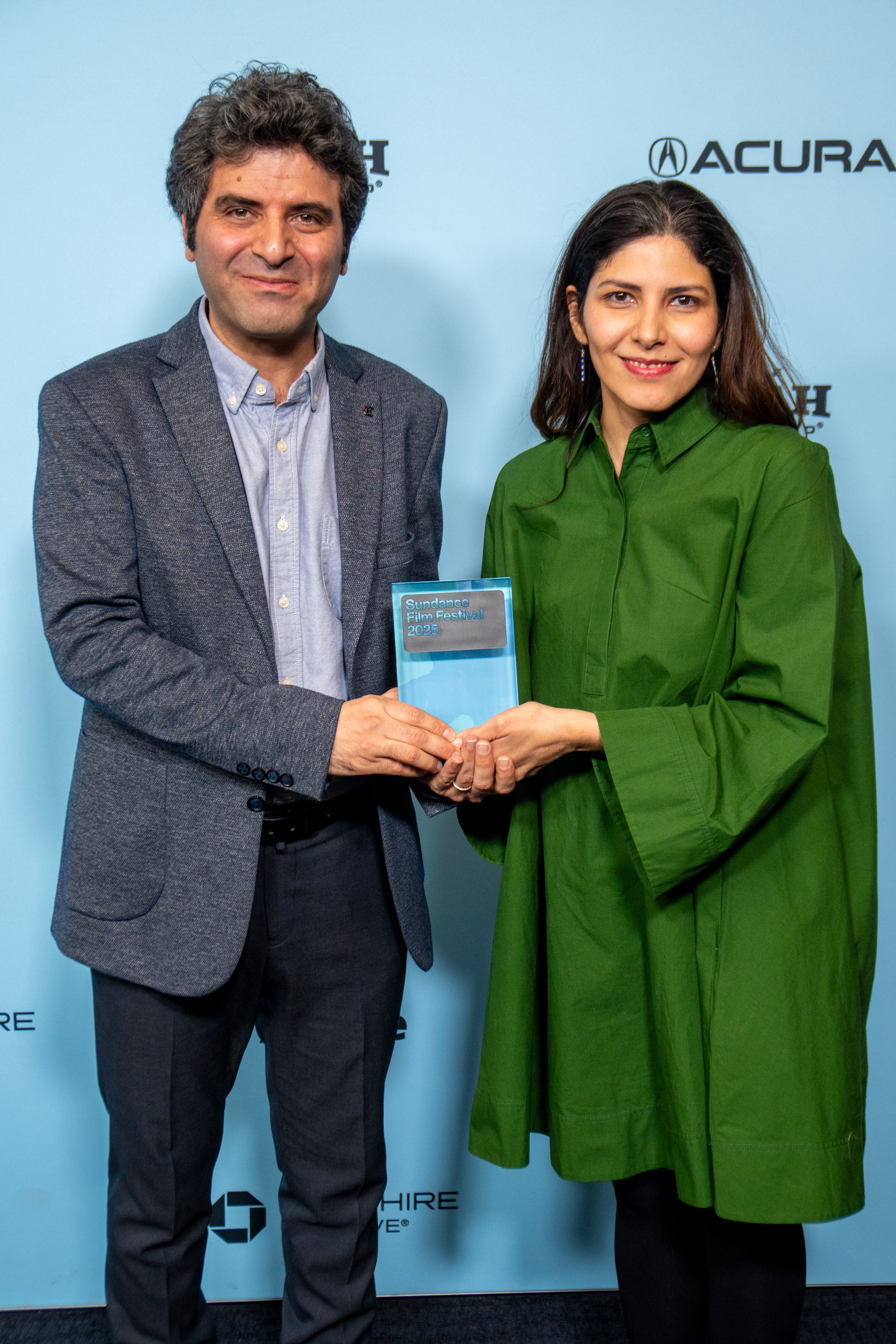
Mohammadreza Eyni and Sara Khaki holding the Sundance Grand Jury Award.

=== Goa ===
- Golden Peacock: Samira Makhmalbaf (2003), Asghar Farhadi (2004), Mohammad Rasoulof (2005)

=== Festroia ===
- Golden Dolphin: Majid Majidi (1997), Bahman Ghobadi (2005)

=== Rotterdam ===
- Hivos Tiger Award: Mohammad Shirvani (2013)

=== Busan ===
- New Currents Award: Marziyeh Meshkini (2000), Alireza Amini (2003), Morteza Farshbaf (2011), Houman Seyyedi (2013)
- FIPRESCI Award: Parviz Shahbazi (2003), Morteza Farshbaf (2011), Safi Yazdanian (2014)

=== Sydney ===
- Prize: Asghar Farhadi (2011)

=== Nantes ===
- Golden Montgolfiere: Amir Naderi (1985 & 1989), Abolfazl Jalili (1996 & 2001), Saman Salur (2006)
- Silver Montgolfiere: Dariush Mehrjui (1993), Reza Mirkarimi (2000)
- Special Jury Award: Alireza Davoudnejad (1992), Asghar Farhadi (2006)
- Best Actress: Niki Karimi(1993), Golshifteh Farahani (2004)

=== Sitges ===
- Best Director: Mohsen Makhmalbaf (1996)
- Best Actor: Hasan Majuni (2017)

=== Istanbul ===
- Golden Tulip: Saeed Ebrahimifar (1990), Jafar Panahi (1998)
- FIPRESCI Prize: Bahman Farmanara (2001)

=== Cairo ===
- Best Film: Nima Javidi (2014)
- Best Director: Masoud Kimiai (1978), Khosro Masumi (2006)
- Best Screenplay: Kianoush Ayari (1998), Tahmineh Milani (2003)
- Best Actress: Pegah Ahangarani (1999), Niki Karimi (2001), Katayoun Riahi (2002)

=== Lifelong achievement Awards ===
- Abbas Kiarostami: Prix Roberto Rossellini Cannes Film Festival (1992)
- Abbas Kiarostami: François Truffaut Award (1992)
- Abbas Kiarostami: Honorary doctorate, École Normale Supérieure (2003)
- Abbas Kiarostami: Federico Fellini Gold Medal, UNESCO (1997)
- Abbas Kiarostami: Officier de la Légion d'honneur from Ministry of Culture and Art of France (1996)
- Abbas Kiarostami: Akira Kurosawa Honorary Award of the San Francisco International Film Festival (2000)
- Abbas Kiarostami: Prix Henri Langlois Prize (2006)
- Amir Naderi: Jaeger-LeCoultre Glory to the Filmmaker Award (2016)
- Asghar Farhadi: National Society of Film Critics Award for Best Screenplay (2011)
- Behrouz Gharibpour: The Hans Christian Andersen Award (2002)
- Ezzatolah Entezami: UNESCO Award (2006)
- Jafar Panahi: Podo Award, at Valdivia Film Festival (2007)
- Mohsen Makhmalbaf: Parajanov Award for outstanding Artistic contribution to the world cinema (2006)
- Mohsen Makhmalbaf: Federico Fellini Gold Medal UNESCO (2001)
- Rakhshan Bani-Etemad: Prince Claus Awards (1998)
- Samira Makhmalbaf: Federico Fellini Gold Medal UNESCO (2000)
- Samira Makhmalbaf: The grand Jury prize American Film Institute (2000)

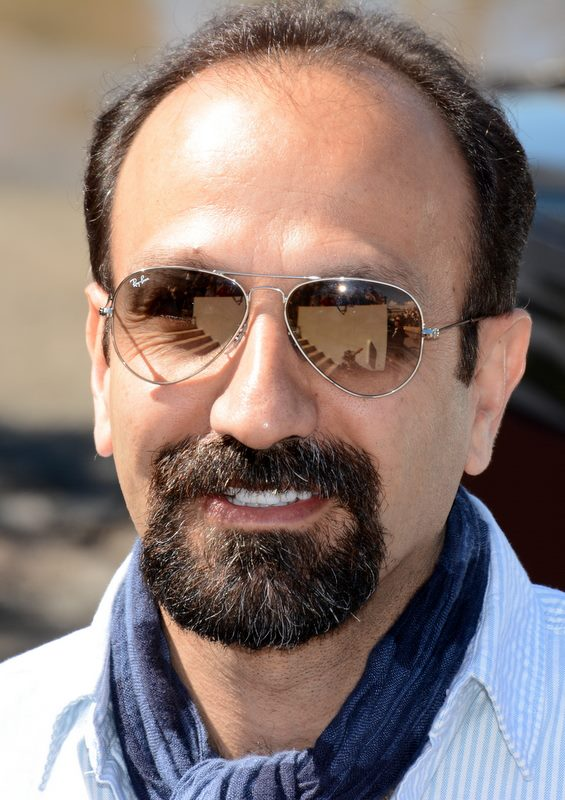
Asghar Farhadi

=== Bodil Awards ===
- 2012: Asghar Farhadi, A Separation

=== Satellite Award ===
- 2011: Asghar Farhadi, A Separation

=== César Award ===
- 2012: Asghar Farhadi Best Foreign Film, A Separation

=== David di Donatello Award ===
- 2012: Asghar Farhadi Best Foreign Film, A Separation

=== National Board of Review ===
- 2011: Asghar Farhadi Best Foreign Language Film, A Separation
- 2013: Asghar Farhadi Best Foreign Language Film, The Past
- 2017: Asghar Farhadi Best Foreign Language Film, The Salesman

== Censorship ==
Although the Iranian film industry is flourishing, its filmmakers have operated under censorship rules, both before and after the revolution. Some Iranian films that have been internationally acclaimed are banned in Iran itself. Conversely, some Iranian filmmakers have faced hostility in other countries.

=== Censorship within Iran ===
Dariush Mehrjui's seminal film Gaav (The Cow, 1969) is now considered a pioneering work of the Iranian New Wave. The film was sponsored by the state, but they promptly banned it upon completion because its vision of rural life clashed with the progressive image of Iran that the Shah wished to project, while its prominence at international film festivals annoyed the regime.

After the Iranian revolution, filmmakers experienced more restrictions. Since the mid-1980s, Iran's policy on film censorship has been changed in order to promote domestic film production: the strict censorship eased after December 1987. Old directors resurfaced and new ones emerged. However, the application of the rules is often inconsistent. Several films have been refused release inside Iran, but have been given export permits to enter international film festivals. Even here, the censorship is inconsistent: May Lady by Rakhshan Bani-Etemad (1998) got through but her contribution to Stories of Kish (1999) did not.

All of Jafar Panahi's films have been banned from public theaters in Iran. Offside was relegated to "a guest slot" at the International Fajr Film Festival. "It was not shown as an important film", says Panahi. "They didn't give any value to it." Several of Mohsen Makhmalbaf's films are also banned in Iran. For example, Time of Love and The night of Zaiandeh-rood were banned for dealing with physical love and for raising doubts about the revolution.

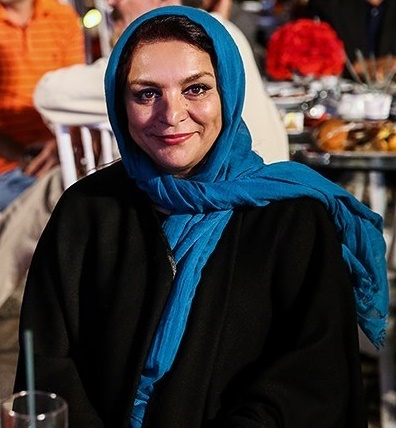
Tahmineh Milani

In 2001, feminist filmmaker Tahmineh Milani who made The Hidden Half was jailed because her movie was presumed anti-revolution (against the 1979 Islamic revolution). Many Iranian and international artists and filmmakers demanded her release. After 8 days of imprisonment, eventually President Khatami and the minister of culture were able to secure her release. In Nargess, Rakhshan Bani-Etemad who is a pioneer among female Iranian film directors, pushes censorship codes to the limits, questioning the morals of society, showing desperate people overwhelmed by social conditions and a couple living together without being married.

Abbas Kiarostami was significantly acclaimed in Europe but the Islamic government has refused screening of his films in his own country. Kiarostami's films have been banned in his country for more than 10 years. They are only accessible there through unauthorized DVDs and private screenings. Kiarostami is uncertain what the government dislikes about his films, saying "I think they don't understand my films and so they prevent them being shown just in case there is a message they don't want to get out.". Despite this, Kiarostami has displayed an extraordinarily benign perspective, at least in recorded interviews: "The government is not in my way, but it is not assisting me either. We lead our separate lives." Despite the censorship, Kiarostami insists on working in Iran, saying "I think I really produce my best work in Iran." He believes that throughout the ages and all over the world censorship has existed in one form or another and artists have managed to live with this, saying "Today, the most important thing is that, although there is censorship, Iranian filmmakers are doing their job and they surpass the difficulties of censorship showing and discussing many things. So why ask me about what's not in the films? It has happened many times that a filmmaker hides a weakness under the excuse of censorship but difficulties have always existed in our lifestyle and our role is to surpass them." The director Mohammed Rasoulof, was convicted of charges relating to state security and anti-government propaganda. In 2009 and 2013 the number of political films and drama like Khers, Guidance Patrol, The Wooden Bridge, I Am a Mother and Private Life (Zendegi Khosoosi) were sanctioned.

=== House of Cinema temporary closure ===
In September 2011, House of Cinema issued a statement in support of several filmmakers detained for contact with the BBC. They questioned the legal basis for the arrests, pointing out that the government itself has contact with international news organizations. As a result, they received an official rebuke.

In December 2011, Iran's Council of Public Culture declared its 'House of Cinema', the country's largest professional organisation for film makers, illegal. Authorities state the organization was shut down because of secret amendments to its charter. House of Cinema came under pressure when it challenged the detention of filmmakers accused of selling films to the BBC.

In September 2013, House of Cinema has been reopened by the new government.

=== Hostility outside Iran ===
Given the tense relationship between Iran and the United States, Iranian filmmakers have faced hostility there, even if they have also been banned in their own country. Abbas Kiarostami was refused a visa to attend the New York Film Festival, Ohio University and Harvard University in 2002, in the wake of the September 11 attacks. Festival director Richard Pena, who had invited him, said: "It's a terrible sign of what's happening in my country today that no one seems to realize or care about the kind of negative signal this sends out to the entire Muslim world". Finnish film director Aki Kaurismäki boycotted the festival in protest. Similarly, Bahman Ghobadi, winner of the Golden Plaque at the Chicago International Film Festival, refused to accept the prize in protest of the U.S. government's refusal to issue him a visa. In 2007, Ahmed Issawi, the abashed Arab director of the New York South Asian Film Festival admitted that a conscious decision was made not to invite any Iranian filmmakers, saying "That's a territory I no longer want to tread [...] It's over. Given the whole thing with Iran—I refuse to approach it."

Several other Iranian filmmakers have experienced hostilities from other countries. In November 2001 in Afghanistan, Taliban officials, who banned movies and most filmmaking, arrested three of Majid Majidi's crew members who were helping him secretly shoot Barefoot to Herat, a documentary on the country's internal refugees. Samira Makhmalbaf also survived a kidnapping in Afghanistan. {West, Dennis and Makhmalbaf, Mohsen. "I Make Cinema in Order to Breathe: An Interview with Mohsen Makhmalbaf". Cinéaste. 34.4, Fall 2009: 10–15. JSTOR Web. 24 Apr. 2014}

In March 2007, a bomb explosion severely injuring several actors and crew members halted production in Afghanistan of Two Legged Horse, the film by Iranian helmer Samira Makhmalbaf. Mohsen Makhmalbaf was the target of two unsuccessful murder attempts when he shot Kandahar in Iran near the Afghan border in 2000, and his daughter Hana was twice the victim of a failed abduction attempt during the shooting of Samira's last film At Five in the Afternoon in the Afghan capital Kabul in 2002.

=== Arresting filmmakers ===
On 1 March 2010, Jafar Panahi was arrested. He was taken from his home along with his wife Tahereh Saidi, daughter Solmaz Panahi, and 15 of his friends by plain-clothes officers to Evin Prison. Most were released 48 hours later, Mohammad Rasoulof and Mehdi Pourmoussa on 17 March 2010, but Panahi remained in section 209 inside Evin Prison. Panahi's arrest was confirmed by the government, but the charges were not specified. On April 14, 2010, Iran's Ministry of Culture and Islamic Guidance said that Panahi was arrested because he "tried to make a documentary about the unrest that followed the disputed 2009 re-election of President Mahmoud Ahmadinejad."On 18 May, Panahi sent a message to Abbas Baktiari, director of the Pouya Cultural Center, an Iranian-French cultural organization in Paris, stating that he was being mistreated in prison and his family threatened and as a result had begun a hunger strike. On 25 May, he was released on $200,000 bail while awaiting trial. On 20 December 2010, Panahi, after being convicted for "assembly and colluding with the intention to commit crimes against the country's national security and propaganda against the Islamic Republic," the Islamic Revolutionary Court sentenced Panahi to six years imprisonment and a 20-year ban on making or directing any movies, writing screenplays, giving any form of interview with Iranian or foreign media as well as leaving the country except for Hajj holy pilgrimage to Mecca or medical treatment. Panahi's colleague, Mohammad Rasoulof also received six years imprisonment but was later reduced to one year on appeal. On October 15, 2011, a court in Tehran upheld Panahi's sentence and ban. Following the courts decision, Panahi was placed under house arrest. He has since been allowed to move more freely but he cannot travel outside Iran.

Hossein Rajabian, an Iranian independent filmmaker, After finishing his first feature film, was arrested by Iranian security forces on 5 October 2013 outside his office [in Sari] alongside two musicians, and was transferred to Ward 2-A of Evin Prison. All three were held in solitary confinement for more than two months and were threatened with televised confessions. He was released on bail (around $66,000) in mid-December, pending trial. Two years later, his case was heard at Branch 28 of Tehran Revolutionary Court which was presided over by Judge Moghisseh (Summer 2015). He was sentenced to six years in prison and fines for pursuing illegal cinematic activities, launching propaganda against the establishment, and hurling insults at sanctities. On appeal, his sentence was changed to three years imprisonment and three years of suspended jail and fines. Rajabian was sent to the ward 7 of Evin Prison in Tehran. After spending one third of his total period of imprisonment (11 months), Rajabian went on hunger strike to protest against unjust trial, lack of medical facilities, and transfer of his brother to another ward called section 8 of the same prison. During the first hunger strike period, which lasted 14 days, Rajabian was hospitalized with a pulmonary infection and was unable to continue his hunger strike due to interference from the representative of the prosecutor who was sent as an intermediary. After some time, he sent an open letter to the judicial authorities of Iran and went again on strike which brought him the supports of international artists. After 36 days of hunger strike, Rajabian convinced the judicial authorities of Iran to review his case and grant him medical leave to treat his blood and kidney infections, which he had developed due to his infection and the hunger strike. After a contentious struggle with the judicial officer, Rajabian was returned to prison.

== Cinema in the Iranian diaspora ==
Cinema people in the Iranian diaspora, such as Shohreh Aghdashloo, Zuleikha Robinson, Nadia Bjorlin, Shirin Neshat, Adrian Pasdar, Amir Mokri, Bahar Soomekh, Amir Talai, Catherine Bell, Nazanin Boniadi, Samira Makhmalbaf, Freema Agyeman, Sarah Shahi, Hughes brothers, Nasim Pedrad, Daryush Shokof, Bijan Daneshmand and Farhad Safinia are also popular.

== Film institutes in Iran ==
Several institutes, both government run and private, provide formal education in various aspects of filmmaking. Some of the prominent ones include: Farabi Cinema Foundation, Hedayat Film Co, Sourehcinema, Documentary & Experimental Film Center, Filmiran, Kanoon Iran Novin, Boshra Film, Bamdad Film, TDH Film, Hilaj Film, Tgpco, Karname, Rasaneha, Nama Film company, AvinyFilm, 7spfs and Honar Aval.

== Iranian film critics ==
Most famous of them like: Houshang Golmakani, Fereydoun Jeyrani, Massoud Farasati, Hamid Reza Sadr, Cyrus Ghani, Negar Mottahedeh, and Parviz Nouri.

== See also ==
- List of Iranian films
- International Fajr Film Festival
- London Iranian Film Festival
- Bāgh-e Ferdows, Film Museum of Iran
- Pre-revolutionary Iranian cinema
- Persian theatre
- Persian Film
- Siahnamayi
- Barbet Schroeder (born in Tehran, where his German geologist father was on assignment)
