= Mozhgan =

Mozhgan, also spelled Mojgan Mezhgan (Persian: مژگان) Mozhgān IPA: [mɔʒˈɡɒːn] and Mozhan is a Persian given name for girls. Mozhgan is the plural form of Mozha (Persian: مژه) IPA: [mɔʒɛ], meaning "eyelash".

Notable people with the given name include:

- Mozhgan Babamarandi, Iranian writer
- Mozhgan Bayat (born 1979), Iranian actress
- Mozhgan Rahmani (born 1989), Iranian darts player
