= Mirza Ebrahim Khan Sahhafbashi =

Iranian photographer and cinematographer

Mirza Ebrahim Khan Sahhafbashi (Persian: میرزا ابراهیم خان صحاف‌باشی; c. 1855–1922), sometimes written as Ebrahim Khan Sahhafbashi-e Tehrani, was a pioneering Iranian photographer, cinematographer, and the first commercial film exhibitor in Iran. Although the French Catholic mission had opened the first public cinema, Soleil Cinema, in Tabriz, in 1900, Sahhafbashi opened the first commercial movie house in Tehran in November 1904. Sahhafbashi also employed a lecturer to explain to the unaccustomed audiences what was on the screen.

== Career ==
Sahhafbashi began traveling widely in 1896, including to the United States, Japan, and Europe, and continued traveling into 1897. Along with Mehdi Qoli Hedayat (who traveled to Japan in 1904, seven years after Sahhafbashi), he was one of the first Iranians to write an individual travelogue based on firsthand experiences in East Asia. His itinerary began on 12 May 1896, traveling from Tehran across the Caspian Sea to the port of Anzali by steamship, then a train to Moscow and from thereon to Berlin. From Berlin, he traveled widely across Europe, including London and Paris; across the Atlantic to New York City, Niagara Falls, and Canada. He then crossed the North American continent by rail and ended in Vancouver and Victoria, British Columbia. From there, he crossed the Pacific to the Japanese port of Yokohama. After leaving Japan, he traveled by sea to Hong Kong, Penang, and India before finally returning to Persia. Unlike Hedayat, his trip, particularly to Japan, took place prior to the Russo-Japanese War; Japan, having defeated Russia, the long-time enemy of Iran and the Ottoman Empire, was described in panegyric terms by later Iranian travelers after the war. Sahhafbashi, by comparison, was quite negative in his descriptions of Japan.

He recorded having seen women, men, and children riding bicycles together in the United States; while in Yokohama, he bought a bicycle, only to immediately fall off it and walk with a limp for ten days. His critique of Europe served a way of critiquing Iranian culture, which he saw as lazy and stupid; he was particularly critical of misogyny in Iranian society.

=== Film ===
Sahhafbashi first viewed movies in the Palace Theatre in London in May 1897. He began his career as an antiques dealer; while studying abroad in Europe, he bought an Edison Kinetoscope film projector and a number of films. In addition to the kinetoscope, he also brought a cinematograph from London back to Iran and provided a Persian-language description for the machine.

In 1904, only nine years after the first movie screening in Europe by the Lumiere brothers, Sahhafbashi opened the first public movie theater in Tehran in the backyard of his antique shop on Cheragh Gaz Avenue. The movie house showed comedies, trick films, Russian documentaries, and newsreels from the First Boer War in South Africa. He also screened films by the French Pathé company. Within a month, it was banned by the cleric Fazlullah Nouri, possibly because it opened during the holy month of Ramadan. Within this month, the twelve-year old Mohammad-Ali Jamalzadeh, one of the most prominent writers in Iran in the 20th century, saw his first film.

=== Political activities ===
Sahhafbashi, like other early pioneers of Iranian cinema, was a constitutionalist and supported the replacement of the despotic monarchy with a parliamentary monarchy. During the Persian Constitutional Revolution in 1909, he joined a secret society that advocated for progressive reforms; in one of the group's meetings, he encouraged members to wear black clothing as a show of mourning for "our mother country, [which] is in the throes of death". He also wrote a letter to Mozaffar ad-Din Shah Qajar in which he threatened to overthrow the shah.

=== Other activities ===
Sahhafbashi also imported other Western scientific equipment such as X-ray machines, phonographs, and steam-powered automobiles. He was also the man who opened the first "Hamām-e nomré" (a kind of public shower with separate bathrooms) in Iran. (History of Iran's Cinema, by Jamal Omid. In Abolqasem Rezaee's quotes about his father, Mirza Ebrahim.)

== Later life ==
In 1906, Sahhafbashi was imprisoned for an unpaid debt of 12,000 (or 14,000) tomans to Arbab Jamshid. Shortly after this, and likely as a result of both the religious opposition to the cinema and Sahhafbashi's pro-Constitutional Revolution activities, Sahhafbashi was exiled from Iran and his property was seized by the crown.

Sahhafbashi's son, Abolghasem Rezai, founded a documentary and dubbing studio with Esfandiar Bozorgmehr and an American rug merchant, Stephen H. Nyman, who was also a representative for 20th Century Fox.

== See also ==
- Persian cinema
