= Kom:Pas =

Film festival in the Czech Republic

KOM:PAS, established in 2012 as Festival of Iranian Films in Prague and later ÍRÁN:CI (Írán:Ci), is a film festival held in Prague and Brno in the Czech Republic. After focusing only on Iranian films until 2024, from 2025 it has a change of name and a change of focus to include independent films from several regions of the world.

== History ==
Established as the Festival of Iranian Films in Prague the festival later changed its name to as ÍRÁN:CI, remaining focused on Iranian cinema until 2024. It was also known in English as the Festival of Iranian Films in Prague, Brno and Bratislava. The festival was held each year except for 2021 and 2022, when the COVID-19 pandemic caused disruption.

The 5th edition of the film festival (Festival of Iranian Films) was held in Prague and Brno as well as in Bratislava, capital of Slovakia.

The 10th edition, after an absence of two years owing to the COVID-19 pandemic, was held in Prague and Brno, and called ÍRÁN:CI. Its theme was "Women, Life, Freedom", being dedicated the women and men behind the movement of the same name that was taking place in Iran. It presented the best films by imprisoned or exiled Iranian filmmakers as well as several films that had been banned in Iran for the previous 30 years.

The 11th edition of Írán:ci was held in Prague and Brno in January 2024.

After this edition, the festival changed its name to KOM:PAS and broadened its focus to include independent films from Central Asia, the Middle East, Africa, and Latin America, each year highlighting one region or country.

The 12th edition of the festival, now known as KOM:PAS, will be held in Prague from 8 to 12 January, and in Brno from 14 to 16 January 2025.
