= Mohammadreza Eyni =

Iranian filmmaker

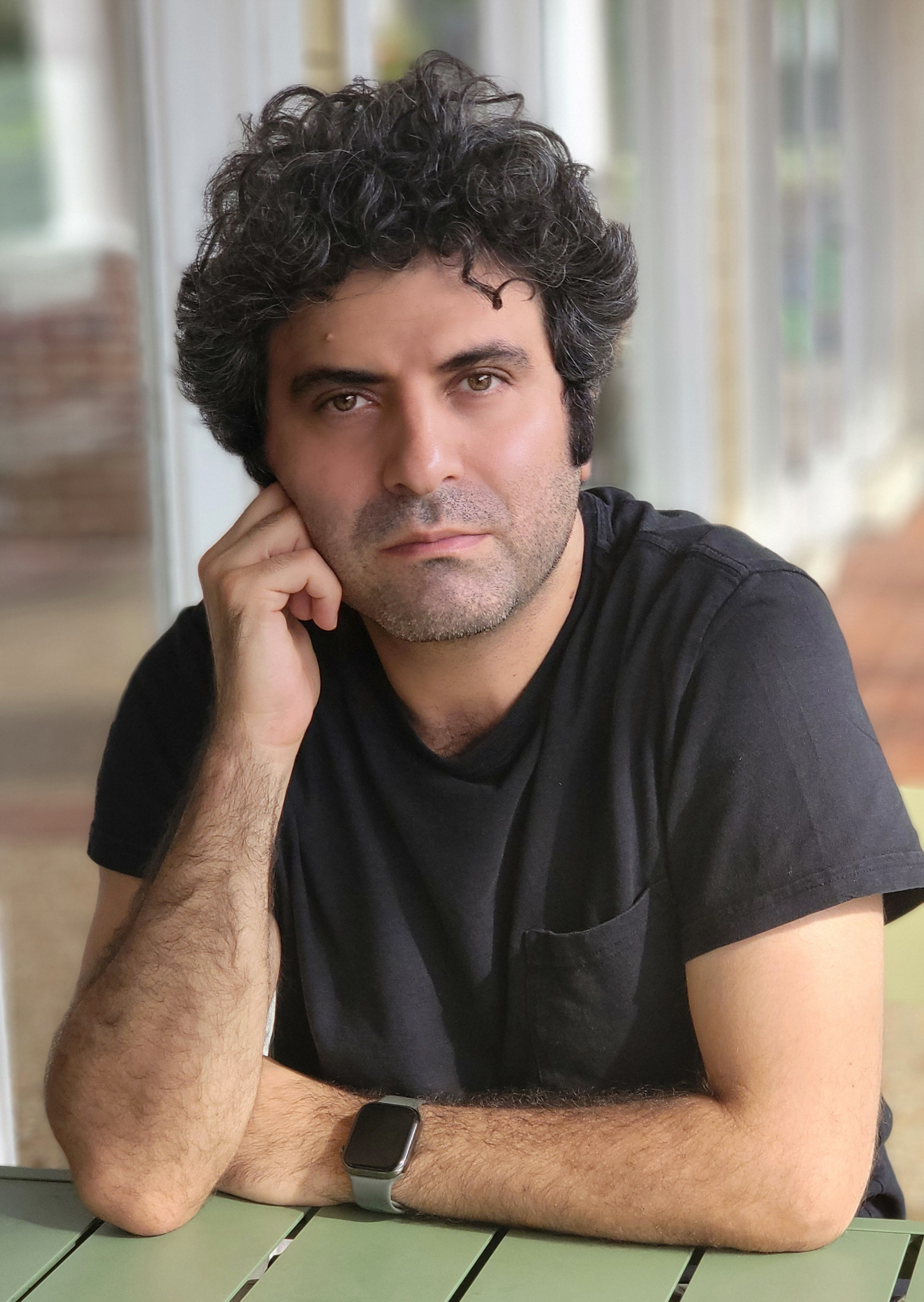
- Mohammadreza Eyni
- Education: University of Tehran, Faculty of Fine Arts
- Occupations: Filmmaker, director, producer
- Years active: 2007–present
- Known for: Cutting Through Rocks

Mohammadreza Eyni is an Oscar nominated U.S.-based filmmaker, director, and producer. He is one of the founders of Gandom Films Production, an independent film production company.

Eyni has worked in cinema as a director and producer since 2007. He is best known internationally for the 2025 documentary film Cutting Through Rocks, which he co-directed and co-produced with Sara Khaki. The film premiered at the 2025 Sundance Film Festival, where it received the World Cinema Documentary Grand Jury Prize, and was subsequently nominated for the Academy Award for Best Documentary Feature at the 98th Academy Awards.

== Education ==
Eyni holds a master's degree in cinema from the Faculty of Fine Arts at the University of Tehran. During his graduate studies, he focused on narrative methods in the history of cinema and completed a master's thesis on nonlinear narrative.

He is also an alumnus of the Tribeca Film Institute.

== Career ==
Eyni has worked as a director and producer in documentary filmmaking since 2007. His filmography includes The Sleepwalker, The Silent Horse, The Friend's House, Our Iranian Lockdown, Convergence: Courage in a Crisis, and Cutting Through Rocks.

Together with filmmaker Sara Khaki, Eyni founded Gandom Films Production L.L.C., an independent production company based in the United States.

In December 2024, it was announced that Eyni and Khaki's feature documentary Cutting Through Rocks would premiere at the 2025 Sundance Film Festival. The film follows Sara Shahverdi, a midwife and divorced woman in a rural Iranian village who runs for a seat on the local council and becomes the first woman elected to the council.

The film premiered on January 27, 2025, to generally positive reviews. On Rotten Tomatoes, the film has a 100% rating.

On January 31, 2025, Cutting Through Rocks received the World Cinema Documentary Grand Jury Prize at the 2025 Sundance Film Festival.

The Sundance jury described the film as a nuanced portrait of a woman confronting a male-dominated society while running for office in a remote Iranian village.

In 2026, Eyni and Khaki were nominated for the Directors Guild of America Award for Outstanding Directorial Achievement in Documentary for Cutting Through Rocks.

=== Academy Awards ===
Cutting Through Rocks was nominated for the Academy Award for Best Documentary Feature at the 98th Academy Awards. Eyni and Khaki were credited as the film's directors and producers.

The nomination made Cutting Through Rocks the first Iranian documentary feature ever nominated for the Academy Award for Best Documentary Feature.

== Filmography ==
Year	Film	Role	Ref.
2014	The Sleepwalker	Director, producer	
2016	The Silent Horse	Director, producer	
2020	The Friend's House	Director, producer	
2020	Our Iranian Lockdown	Director, producer	
2021	Convergence: Courage in a Crisis	Director, producer	
2025	Cutting Through Rocks	Director, producer	

== Awards and nominations ==
Year	Festival / organization	Country	Award	Result	Film	Ref.
2026	Academy Awards	United States	Academy Award for Best Documentary Feature	Nominated	Cutting Through Rocks	
2025	IDFA	Netherlands	NPO Doc IDFA Audience Award	Won	Cutting Through Rocks	
2026	Directors Guild of America	United States	Outstanding Directorial Achievement in Documentary	Nominated	Cutting Through Rocks	
2022	International Documentary Association	United States	IDA Award for Best Short Documentary	Nominated	Our Iranian Lockdown	
2022	News & Documentary Emmy Awards	United States	News & Documentary Emmy Award	Nominated	Convergence: Courage in a Crisis	
2025	Edinburgh International Film Festival	United Kingdom	Audience Award	Nominated	Cutting Through Rocks	
2025	Galway Film Fleadh	Ireland	Audience Award	Nominated	Cutting Through Rocks	
2025	Giffoni Film Festival	Italy	Griffon Award for Best Film – Documentary	Won	Cutting Through Rocks	
2025	Humanitas Prize	United States	Humanitas Prize – Documentary	Nominated	Cutting Through Rocks	
2025	DOK Leipzig	Germany	Golden Dove	Won	Cutting Through Rocks	
2025	Melbourne International Film Festival	Australia	Audience Award – Documentary	Nominated	Cutting Through Rocks	
2025	Newport Beach Film Festival	United States	Jury Award for Best First Feature	Won	Cutting Through Rocks	
2025	San Francisco International Film Festival	United States	Audience Award – Documentary	Nominated	Cutting Through Rocks	
2025	Sundance Film Festival	United States	World Cinema Documentary Grand Jury Prize	Won	Cutting Through Rocks	
2025	Sydney Film Festival	Australia	JIO Audience Award for Best International Documentary	Nominated	Cutting Through Rocks	
2025	Vancouver International Film Festival	Canada	Audience Award	Nominated	Cutting Through Rocks	
2025	Warsaw International Film Festival	Poland	Free Spirit Award	Won	Cutting Through Rocks	
2025	Warsaw International Film Festival	Poland	NETPAC Award	Won	Cutting Through Rocks	
2025	Warsaw International Film Festival	Poland	Audience Award – Documentary Films, second place	Nominated	Cutting Through Rocks	
2025	Woodstock Film Festival	United States	Best Documentary Feature	Won	Cutting Through Rocks	
2025	Woodstock Film Festival	United States	Maverick Award for Best Director	Won	Cutting Through Rocks	
2025	Bergen International Film Festival	Norway	Best International Documentary	Nominated	Cutting Through Rocks	
2025	Alternative Film Festival	Canada	Best Documentary	Won	Cutting Through Rocks	
2025	Athens International Film Festival	Greece	Golden Athena – Best Documentary	Nominated	Cutting Through Rocks	
2025	Hot Docs	Canada	Audience Top 10	Nominated	Cutting Through Rocks	
2025	Göteborg Film Festival	Sweden	International Award – Best Documentary	Nominated	Cutting Through Rocks	
2025	Visions du Réel	Switzerland	Audience Award – Grand Angle Competition	Won	Cutting Through Rocks	
2025	Rio de Janeiro International Film Festival	Brazil	Audience Award – Best Documentary	Nominated	Cutting Through Rocks	
2025	New York Women in Film & Television	United States	Excellence in Directing Award	Won	Cutting Through Rocks	
2025	Tallinn Black Nights Film Festival	Estonia	Best Documentary	Nominated	Cutting Through Rocks	
2026	Cinema for Peace	Germany	Women's Empowerment Award	Won	Cutting Through Rocks	
2026	Films That Matter	Netherlands	Audience Award – Best Film	Won	Cutting Through Rocks	
2026	Films That Matter	Netherlands	Activist Documentary Award	Won	Cutting Through Rocks	
2025	Hot Springs Documentary Film Festival	United States	Best Documentary – International Feature	Nominated	Cutting Through Rocks	
2025	DocsBarcelona	Spain	DocsBarcelona TV3 Award – Best Documentary	Nominated	Cutting Through Rocks	
2025	New Zealand International Film Festival	New Zealand	Audience Award – Frames Competition	Won	Cutting Through Rocks	
2025	New Zealand International Film Festival	New Zealand	Best Film – Frames Competition	Won	Cutting Through Rocks	
2026	Social Impact Media Awards	United States	Best Director	Won	Cutting Through Rocks	
2026	Social Impact Media Awards	United States	Feature Documentary	Nominated	Cutting Through Rocks	
2025	Guanajuato International Film Festival	Mexico	International Competition – Documentary	Nominated	Cutting Through Rocks	
2025	Montclair Film Festival	United States	Bruce Sinofsky Prize for Documentary Feature	Nominated	Cutting Through Rocks	
2025	Maine International Film Festival	United States	Audience Award	Nominated	Cutting Through Rocks	
2025	Berkshire International Film Festival	United States	Audience Award – Documentary Feature	Nominated	Cutting Through Rocks	
2025	DMZ International Documentary Film Festival	South Korea	Special Jury Mention – International Competition	Won	Cutting Through Rocks	
2026	ZagrebDox	Croatia	Films That Matter Award	Won	Cutting Through Rocks	
2026	Docville	Belgium	Jury Award – Best Thematic Documentary	Nominated	Cutting Through Rocks	
2025	Catalonia International Social Film Festival	Spain	Jury Award – Best Film	Won	Cutting Through Rocks	
2025	This Human World	Austria	Jury Award – Best Documentary	Won	Cutting Through Rocks	
2025	Festival des Libertés	Belgium	Grand Prize	Won	Cutting Through Rocks	
2025	Festival des Libertés	Belgium	Best Film	Won	Cutting Through Rocks	
2025	Middle East Now	Italy	Felicetta Ferraro Award	Won	Cutting Through Rocks	
2025	MDOC – Melgaço International Documentary Film Festival	Portugal	Jean-Loup Passek Award for Best Feature	Won	Cutting Through Rocks	
2025	International Film Festival of Education	France	Jury Award – Best Film	Won	Cutting Through Rocks	
2025	Verzió Film Festival	Hungary	Best Human Rights Film	Won	Cutting Through Rocks	
2024	Anthem Awards	United States	Anthem Award – Arts & Culture	Won	Cutting Through Rocks	
2025	Centre Film Festival	United States	Jury Selection Award – Best Documentary	Won	Cutting Through Rocks	
2024	Trivaviva Film Festival	Canada	Jury Award – Best Documentary Feature	Won	Cutting Through Rocks	
2025	Seattle Documentary Film Festival	United States	Audience Award	Nominated	Cutting Through Rocks	

== Masterclasses and professional workshops ==
Alongside his professional work as a director and producer, Eyni has participated in international masterclasses, panels, and professional sessions focusing on filmmaking, editing, cinematography, and visual storytelling.

- In February 2026, Eyni participated in Chaos and Control: Exposing Systems That Thrive on Confusion as part of Berlinale Talents in Berlin. The session examined the role of documentary filmmaking in confronting abuses of power, accountability, and hidden forms of injustice.
- In January 2025, Eyni participated in Focus on Lenses at the Canon Creative Studio in Park City during the Sundance Film Festival. The session examined the role of lenses in shaping the look and feel of a project and their use in communicating the meaning of a scene.
- In 2025, Eyni participated in More Than Meets the Eye: Master Class in Visual Storytelling as part of the Reality program at DC/DOX.
- In 2025, Eyni participated in Behind the Scenes: Editing Masterclass Series at the Maysles Documentary Center in New York, focusing on documentary editing and the process through which a final cut is shaped.
- On December 12, 2025, Eyni and Sara Khaki participated in the online event Inside the Edit with BIPOC Doc Editors: Cutting Through Rocks, organized by Sundance Collab.
- On November 19, 2025, Eyni participated in Cinematography and the Visual Language of Docs as part of DOC NYC's professional programming, discussing cinematography, framing, and visual language in documentary storytelling.
