= Mirza Ebrahim Khan Akkas Bashi =

Iranian cinematographer and photographer

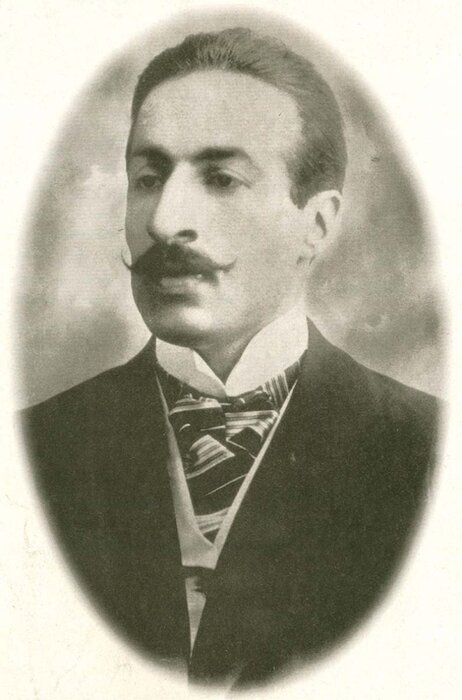
- Portrait of Mirza Ebrahim Khan Akkas Bashi
- Born: August 1874
- Died: 1915; Gilan province, Qajar Iran
- Known for: First Iranian cinematographer
- Father: Mirza Ahmad Sani-al-saltana

Mirza Ebrahim Khan Akkas Bashi (Persian: میرزا ابراهیم‌خان عکاس‌باشی; August 1874 – 1915) was an Iranian photographer and cinematographer. He became the first cinematographer of the country on 15 August 1900, when he recorded Mozaffar ad-Din Shah Qajar (r. 1896–1907) strolling on the beach of the town of Ostend in Belgium.

Akkas Bashi was born in August 1874. He was the son of Mirza Ahmad Sani-al-saltana, a Baháʼí convert and chief photographer of Naser al-Din Shah Qajar (r. 1848–1896). Akkas Bashi died in 1915 in the Gilan province.

== Sources ==
- Eslami, Kambiz (2009). "ʿAkkāsbāshī, Ibrāhīm". In Fleet, Kate; Krämer, Gudrun; Matringe, Denis; Nawas, John; Rowson, Everett (eds.). Encyclopaedia of Islam (3rd ed.). Brill Online. ISSN 1873-9830.
- Gaffary, F. (1984). "ʿAkkās-bāšī". In Yarshater, Ehsan (ed.). Encyclopædia Iranica. Vol. I/7: Ahriman–Alafrank. London and New York: Routledge & Kegan Paul. p. 719. ISBN 978-0-71009-096-6.
