= Mehdi Rusi Khan Ivanov =

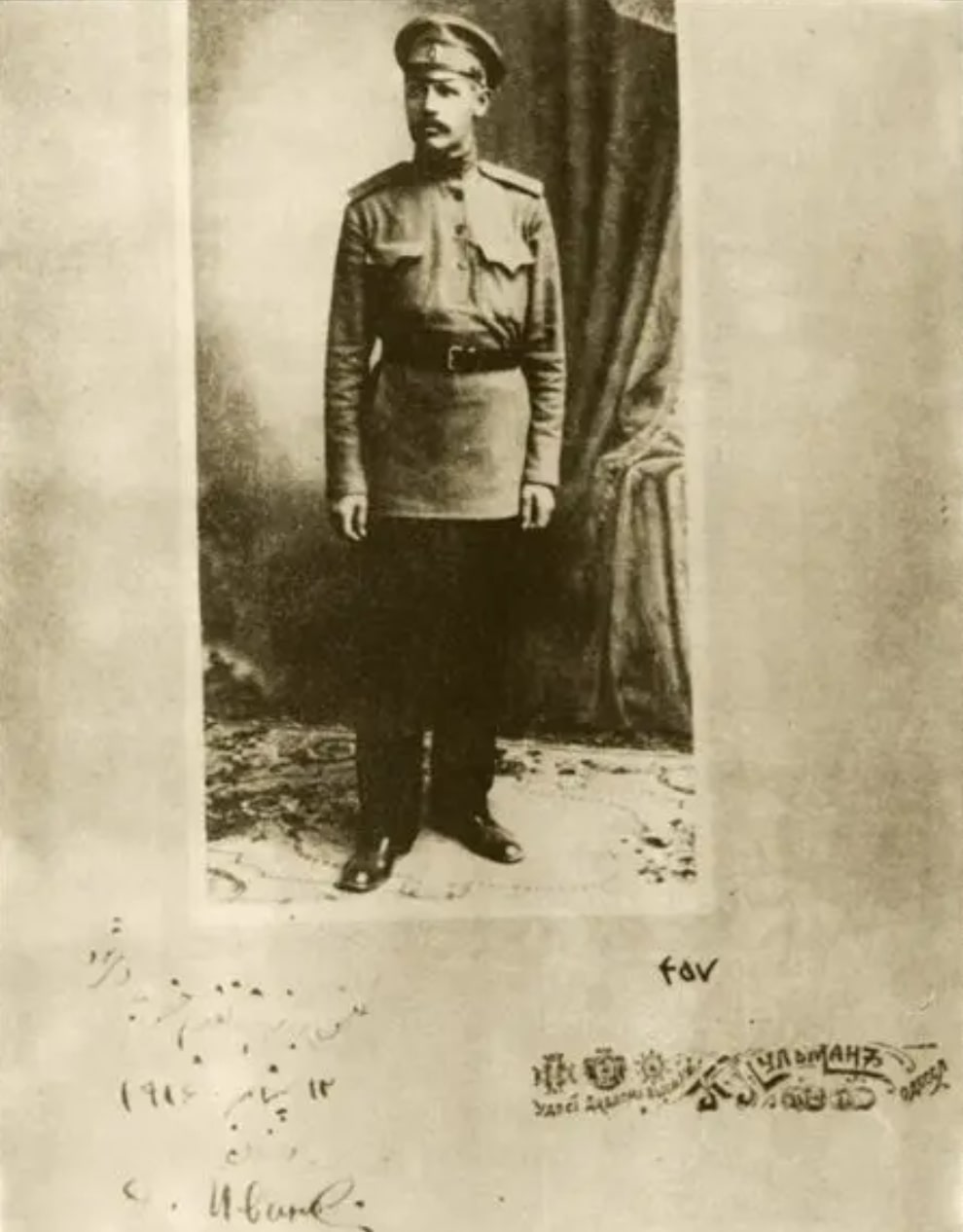
- Portrait of Mehdi Rusi Khan Ivanov in military uniform, dated 1916
- Born: 15 October 1875; Tehran, Qajar Iran
- Died: 15 March 1968 (aged 92); Paris, France
- Occupation: Photography

Mehdi Rusi Khan Ivanov (Persian: مهدی روسی خان ایوانوف; 15 October 1875 – 15 March 1968) was a court photographer in Qajar Iran. Born in Tehran, he had connections to Russia through his family background and social affiliations. He had mixed Russian Tatar and British roots, but historians disagree on which parent came from which background. In 1911, he permanently settled in Paris to work under the wife of the previous shah, Mohammad Ali Shah Qajar.

== Sources ==
- Naficy, Hamid (2011). A Social History of Iranian Cinema, Volume 1: The Artisanal Era, 1897-1941. Duke University Press. ISBN 978-0822347750.
- Partovi, P. (2024). "Mahdī Ivanov (Rūsī Khan): The Enigmatic Pioneer of Iranian Cinema.". Encyclopædia Iranica.
