= Persian nouns =

Persian nouns have no grammatical gender, and the case markers have been greatly reduced since Old Persian—both characteristics of contact languages. Persian nouns now mark with a postposition only for the specific accusative case; the other oblique cases are marked by adpositions.

== Pluralization ==
There are two common and productive form of pluralization for Persian nouns. The suffix hā (ها) is typically used for any kind of noun. Another productive plural suffix is ān (ان), typically used for human nouns (with alternative forms gān (گان) after the short vowel e and yān (یان) after other vowels). Many nouns borrowed from Arabic feminine forms pluralize using the āt (ات) suffix. Nouns borrowed from Arabic human forms often pluralize using īn (ین). The class of Arabic broken plurals are formed through internal vowel alternation. These nouns pluralize in Persian like their counterparts in Arabic.

In colloquial Persian, the plural suffix -hā (pronounced -ā after consonants) can be used with virtually all nouns, even if they take an ān-plural or an Arabic plural in the written standard language. For example, one can say mard-hā (or mard-ā) instead of standard mardān ("men").

== Case/definiteness ==
Definiteness and specificity is marked in ways overlapping with case marking. The postposition -ra marks a definite or specific direct object. An indefinite noun can be marked by an enclitic -i or the numeral ye(k).

== Noun derivation ==
Persian nouns can be formed by using a number of productive suffixes and affixes. This example shows some possible derivations from the word dān, present stem of the verb dānestan, "to know":

derivations from verb: dānestan
| Root | Suffix | Derivation | Meaning | Notes |
|---|---|---|---|---|
| *dān | -eš | dāneš | "knowledge" | - |
| *dān | -ā | dānā | "wise" | - |
| *dāneš | -mand | dānešmand | "scientist" | - |
| *dāneš | -ik | dānešik | "scientific" | modern Persian: "dāneši" |
| *dāneš | -gāh | dānešgāh | "university" | (the foundation which organizes the higher-education activities) |
| *dāneš | -kade | dāneškade | "college/faculty" | (the building in which certain field of knowledge is taught) |
| *dāneš | + āmuz | dānešāmuz | "student" | (who {āmuz} "Learns" {dāneš} "knowledge") |
| *dāneš | + ju | dānešju | "university student" | (who {ju} "seeks" {dāneš} "knowledge") |
| *dāneš | + pažuh | dānešpažuh | "science/knowledge researcher" | (who {pažuh} "investigates"{dāneš} "knowledge") |

== Possession ==
Possession is expressed by special markers: if the possessor appears in the sentence after the thing possessed, the ezafe may be used; otherwise, alternatively, a pronominal genitive enclitic is employed.

Genitive enclitics
| Person | Singular | Plural |
|---|---|---|
| 1st | am | emān |
| 2nd | at | etān |
| 3rd | aš | ešān |

== Ezafe ==
The اضافه (ezafe) (ez) construction denotes certain relationships between Persian words, among them: possession, qualification (adjective-noun), and names (first and last names). Ezafe is indicated by the short vowel kasra (ـِ e). Since short vowels are not normally written in Persian, it usually does not appear in text (exceptions are listed below), but it can be heard in spoken Persian. It is similar, but not identical, to the Arabic idaafa (إضافة) construction.

The following are some examples usages of the ezafe construction.

- Possession:

کتاب من - ke'tab-e mæn, literally "book-of me", means "my book"

- Qualification:

دختر زیبا dox'tær-e zī'bā, literally "girl-of beautiful" means "(the) beautiful girl"

- Multiple words can be connected through the ezafa construction, as in the following example of both possession and qualification:

دختر زیبای دوستم dox'tær-e zī'bā-ye dust-æm, literally "girl-of beautiful-of friend-my", means "my friend's beautiful daughter".

And: دختر دوست زیبایم dox'tær-e dūst-e zī'bā-yæm, literally "girl-of friend-of beautiful-my", means "my beautiful friend's daughter". (Doxtær can mean either girl or daughter, depending on the context.)

Spelling exceptions: Ezafe, while pronounced in speech, is not usually written, but it does show up in writing in the following two cases involving words ending in vowels.

1. In the case of heh, the normal heh is replaced with a 'heh yeh' which is a heh with a small 'yeh' on top. Example:

house = خانه /xā'ne/

my friend's house = خانهٔ دوستم /xā'ne-ye dūstæm/

A spelling variant for this would be a normal he with a non-connected ye following. This spelling is rare and is also not according to the standard orthography of the Academy of Persian Language and Literature.

my friend's house = خانه‌ی دوستم /xā'ne-ye dūstæm/

2. If a noun or adjective ends in alef (ا) and another noun or adjective is attached to it in an ezafe (ـِ) relationship, the letter yeh (ی) must be attached to the end of the word to carry the sound of the extra syllable. Example:

air/weather = هوا /hæ'vā/

"Tehran's weather" = هوای تهران /hæ'vā-ye tεh'rān/

NOTE: Ezafe can be written using the diacritic marker representing the short vowel zir, also known as kasra. That looks like this:

کتابِ من - my book (note the small slanted line below the left-most character in the rightmost word both here and in the next example; you may need to increase the font size to really be able to see it)

دخترِ زیبای دوستم - my friend's beautiful daughter
