= Cutting Through Rocks =

2025 documentary film by Mohammadreza Eyni and Sara Khaki

- Promotional poster
- Directed by: Mohammadreza Eyni; Sara Khaki
- Produced by: Mohammadreza Eyni; Sara Khaki
- Cinematography: Mohammaderza Eyni
- Edited by: Mohammadreza Eyni; Sara Khaki
- Music by: Karim Sebastian Elias
- Production company: Gandom Films Production
- Release dates: 27 January 2025 (Sundance); 21 November 2025 (United States)
- Running time: 95 minutes
- Countries: Iran; Qatar; Chile; Canada; Netherlands; Germany; United States
- Languages: Azerbaijani; Turkish; Persian; English

Cutting Through Rocks is a 2025 documentary film directed by Mohammadreza Eyni and Sara Khaki, in their feature debut. It follows the first Iranian woman elected as a councilwoman in a rural village.

The film had its world premiere at the World Documentary Competition section of the 2025 Sundance Film Festival on 27 January. At the 98th Academy Awards, it was nominated for Best Documentary.

== Synopsis ==
As the first elected councilwoman of her Iranian village, Sara Shahverdi aims to break long-held patriarchal traditions by training teenage girls to ride motorcycles and stopping child marriages. When accusations arise questioning Sara’s intentions to empower the girls, her identity is put in turmoil.

Sheila Nevins, former head of MTV Documentary Films, serves as one of the film's executive producers, along with Meadow Fund, Chandra Jesse, Monika Parekh, Rebecca Lichtenfeld, Judith Helfand, Julie Parker Benello, Geralyn White Dreyfous, and Jenny Warburg.Diana Barrett, James Graham, and Thomas Lennon are Contributing Producers. Rebecca Celli is a Consulting Producer.

== Release ==
Cutting Through Rocks had its world premiere at the 2025 Sundance Film Festival in the World Documentary Competition. Following its Sundance premiere, the film also screened at Visions du Réel, San Francisco International Film Festival, Sydney Film Festival, Edinburgh International Film Festival, International Film Festival Amsterdam, DOC NYC, and Hot Docs Canadian International Documentary Festival.

The film released in the United States at Film Forum on 21 November 2025, followed by a limited theatrical release in the United States, Canada, and the UK. During its release at Film Forum, The New York Times made the film a Critic’s Pick, with film critic Sheri Linden calling it "a film that pulses with so much hopefulness."

== Reception ==
=== Critical response ===
On review aggregator website Rotten Tomatoes, the film has a 100% rating with 31 critics' reviews. Following its Sundance premiere, Lauren Wissot from IndieWire called the film "a deftly shaped work of cinematic nonfiction" and Autlook Filmsales, one of the leading documentary sales outfits, acquired the film.

On January 31, Cutting Through Rocks received the World Cinema Grand Jury Prize: Documentary at the 2025 Sundance Film Festival, with the Sundance jury saying, "this beautiful and nuanced portrait shows us a fearless eccentric who confronts male-dominated society when she runs for office in a remote Iranian village. Her determination, warmth, and humor and the way her story is told left us in awe."

The film has received dozens awards from festivals across the world. On April 11, during its international premiere, the film was awarded the Audience Award in the Wide Angle section at Visions du Réel in Nyon, Switzerland. Other audience awards at major film festivals include Giffoni Film Festival, New Zealand International Film Festival, and International Documentary Film Festival Amsterdam. Cutting Through Rocks also received the Best Documentary Feature award and the NYWIFT Award for Excellence in Directing from Woodstock Film Festival and the Jury Award for Best First Feature at Newport Beach Film Festival.

On December 16, Cutting Through Rocks was featured on the shortlist for the 98th Academy Awards, under the Best Documentary Feature category. Following the shortlist release, the film was featured as number seven on IndieWire's The Best Documentaries of 2025 list.

=== Accolades ===
Award / Film Festival	Year	Category	Recipient(s)	Result	Ref.
Sundance Film Festival	2025	Grand Jury Prize, World Documentary Competition	Cutting Through Rocks	Won	
Visions du Réel	2025	Audience Award, Wide Angle	Cutting Through Rocks	Won	
Giffoni Film Festival	2025	Gryphon Award Best Film, GEX Doc	Cutting Through Rocks	Won	
Woodstock Film Festival	2025	Best Documentary Feature and NYWIFT Award for Excellence in Directing	Cutting Through Rocks	Won	
International Documentary Film Festival Amsterdam	2025	NPO Doc IDFA Audience Award	Cutting Through Rocks	Won	
Cinema Eye Honors	2026	Audience Choice Prize	Cutting Through Rocks	Longlisted	
Cinema Eye Honors	2026	The Unforgettables	Sara Shahverdi	Won	
Academy Awards	2026	Best Documentary Feature	Cutting Through Rocks	Nominated	
