= Mozhgan Bayat =

Iranian actress

- مژگان بیات
- Born: 20 July 1979 (age 46); Tehran, Iran
- Occupation: Actress
- Years active: 2007–present

Mozhgan Bayat (Persian: مژگان بیات; born July 20, 1979) is an Iranian actress, film director, and writer. She studied film directing at Soureh University in Tehran and began her cinematic career with the film For My Sister (2007). Bayat has since appeared in a wide range of feature films and television productions, including Parinaaz (2012), Can You Hear Me? (2016), and Janan (2018). In addition to acting, she has directed and written several projects, most notably the drama Shoomah (2024).

== Biography ==
She graduated in film directing from Soura University; And she started her cinematic activity in 2007 with the film For My Sister.

== Filmography ==
Cinematic
Year	Title	Director	Role
2008	A Little Mistake	Mohsen Damadi	Mozhdeh
2008	My American Fiancé	Davood Tohidparast	Mehrnush
2008	Chahar changooli	Saeed Soheili	Meymanat
2009	bad dream	Manouchehr Hadi	Sahar
2012	Ghabrestan-e Gheyr-e Entefaee	Mohsen Damadi	Sogol
2012	Parinaaz	Bahram Bahramian	Afsar
2012	Cheque	Kazem Rastgoftar	Gohar
2012	Bi Khodahafezi	Ahmad Amini	Hedieh
2016	Can you hear me?	Sadegh Parvin Ashtiani	Khorshid
2018	Janan	Kamran Ghadakchian	Janan

TV series
Year	Title	Director	Role
2017	Brother (TV series)	Javad Afshar	Atieh
