= Fickle =

Fickle may refer to:

- Fickle, Indiana
- The Fickle, a 1934 Iranian romance-drama film

People with the surname Fickle include:

- Daniel Fickle (born 1980), American film director
- Malindi Fickle, American actress
- William Fickle, American politician

== See also ==
- Fat and Fickle, 1916 American comedy film
- Fickle Hill, California
- Fickle Friends, an indie rock band from Brighton, England
- Jacob Earl Fickel (1883–1956), U.S. Air Force major general
- La donna è mobile ("woman is fickle")
- Little Miss Fickle, a character in the Little Miss series of children's books
