= Doulab Cemetery =

Iranian national heritage site

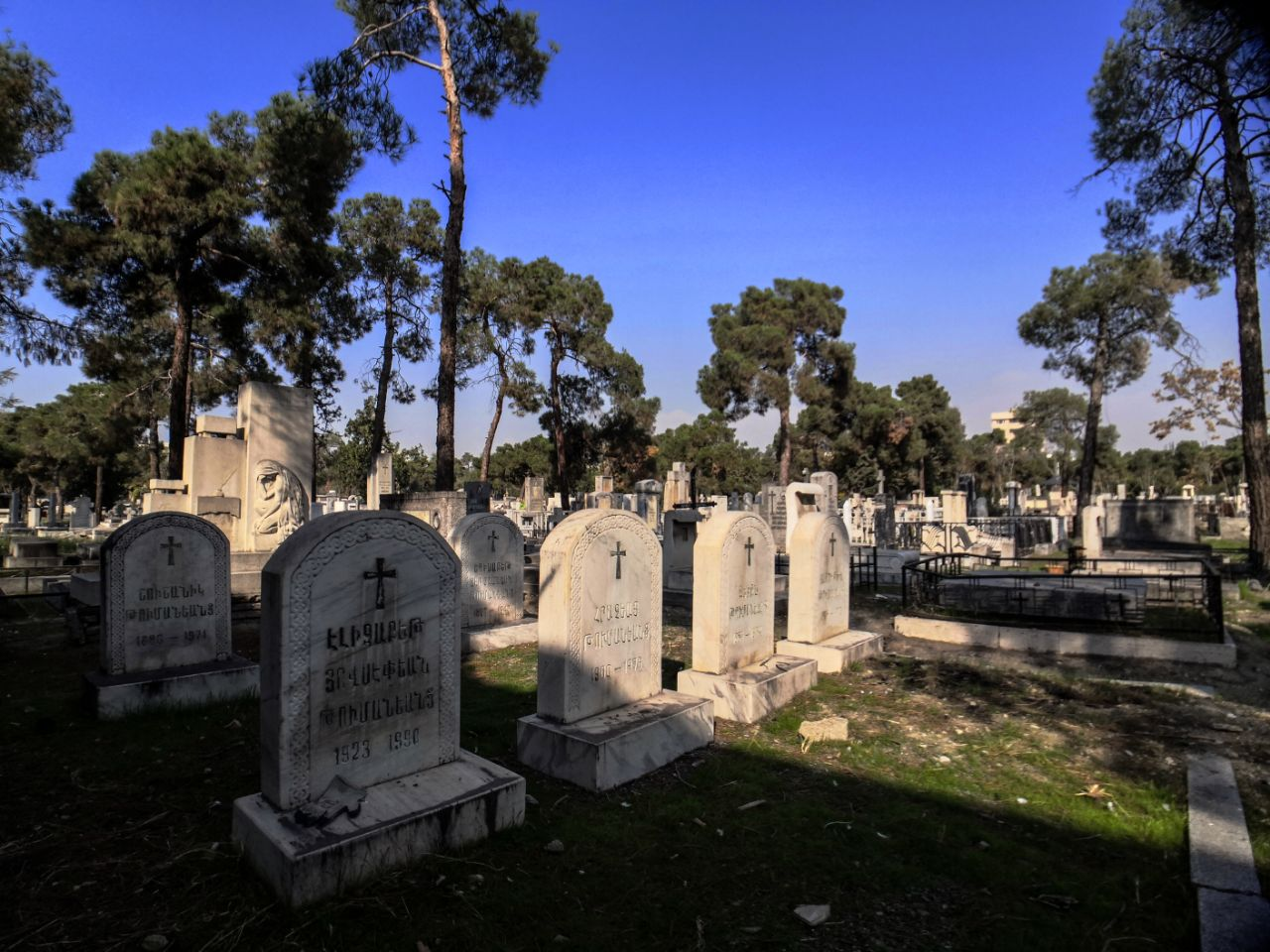
- Interactive map of Doulab Cemetery

Details
- Established: 1855
- Location: Ahang Expressway, 10th Farvardin street
- Country: Iran
- Owned by: Cultural Heritage, Handcrafts and Tourism Organization
- Size: 18.5 acres (7.49 ha)
- No. of interments: 22,000
- Website: doulabcemetery.org

Doulab Cemetery (Persian: آرامستان دولاب) is a historic cemetery situated in the eastern suburbs of Tehran, Iran. One of the most important Christian cemeteries, it consists of five sections:

- Armenian Apostolic
- Eastern Orthodox (Russians, Georgians and Greeks)
- Roman Catholic
- Armenian Catholic
- Assyrian (Assyrian Church of the East, Chaldean Catholic and Protestant)

== History of the Roman Catholic Cemetery ==
The origins of the Doulab Catholic Cemetery go back to the middle of the 19th century. In 1855, the young Dr. Louis André Ernest Cloquet, personal physician to Naser al-Din Shah Qajar, died and was buried in a field situated in the Tehran district of Doulab, close to the Armenian cemetery. This patch of land was to become the burial site for all Catholics of Tehran, foreigners and locals. Dr. Cloquet's tomb, bearing a small brick cupola, can still be seen.

From the time of their arrival in Tehran in 1862, the Lazarists, being the only Catholic priests in the city, took charge of the cemetery. At the time 87 Catholics lived in Tehran, all of whom were foreigners or Chaldean Catholics. In 1886, Joseph Désiré Tholozan, a French officer of the Légion d’honneur and physician for the French mission, purchased the terrain for the cemetery. From that time on, the cemetery was at the service of the Catholic community of Tehran, which became ever more numerous and international.

In 1942, an estimated 120,000 Polish soldiers and civilians arrived on the Iranian shore in Bandar Anzali. They had been released from Soviet captivity and were to set up the Polish Army of the East under General Władysław Anders. Many didn't survive the hardships of the journey and died upon their arrival in Iran or shortly thereafter. Therefore, the Polish Embassy purchased half of the terrain of the cemetery and arranged the graves of those who had died in Tehran.

In 1943, the Armenian Catholic community built their own cemetery next to the “Latin” one, the Chaldean Catholics did the same in 1963, and today the complex consists of five parts totaling about 76,000 m^{2}. In 2000, the site was listed as a national cultural heritage item (No. 2688) by the Iranian Cultural Heritage Organization (ICHTO).

Throughout the second half of the 20th century the cemetery continued to serve the Catholic community. In average five burials were held each year. However, in the 1990s the city administration revoked the permission to use the ground as a burial site. Eventually, their reasoning went, after forty years had passed, graves could be demolished and the site used for building purposes. A new location for the Catholic cemetery was identified, and Doulab seemed doomed to fall into oblivion.

National communities represented in the Catholic Cemetery include: Germany, United States, England, Argentina, Armenia, Assyrians (Iran), Austria, Belgium, Spain, Estonia, France, Greece, Netherlands, Hungary, Iraq, Ireland, Italy, Japan, Yugoslavia, Latvia, Lebanon, Lithuania, Malaysia, New, Zealand, Pakistan, Philippines, Portugal, Russia, Sweden, Switzerland, Syria, Czechoslovakia, Turkey.

== Notable burials ==
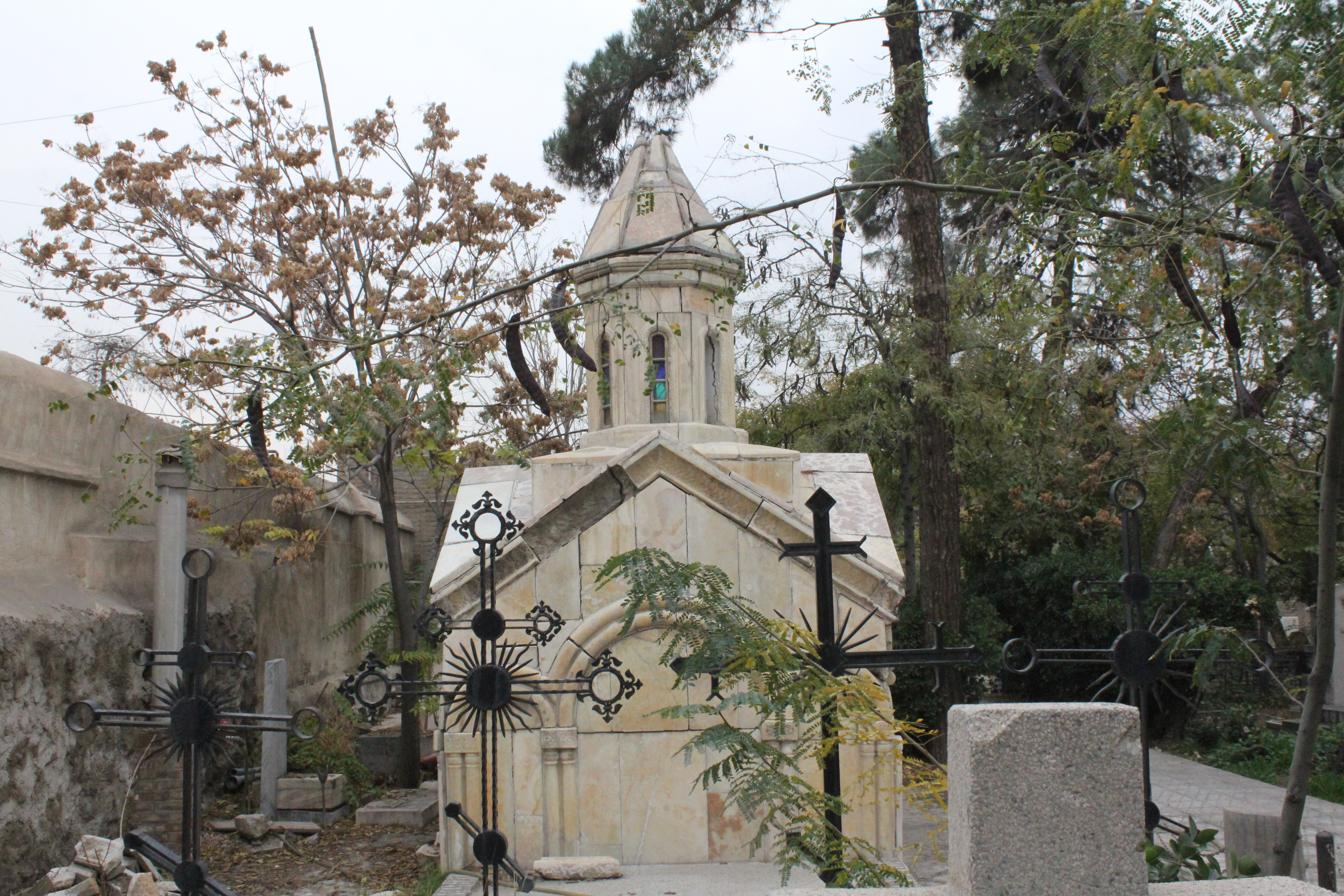
Mausoleum of Minadora Khoshtaria

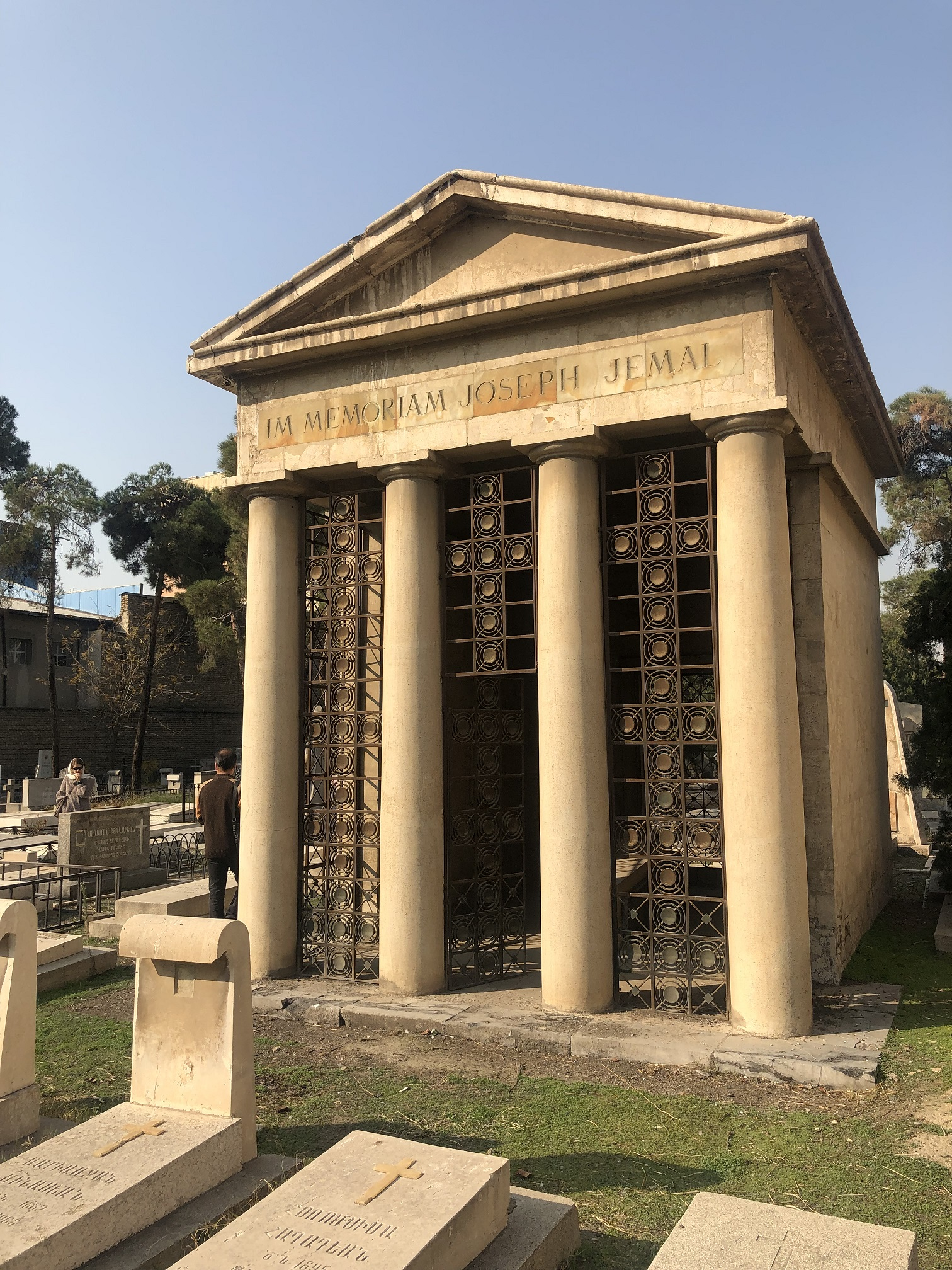
Tomb of an Iraqi diplomat

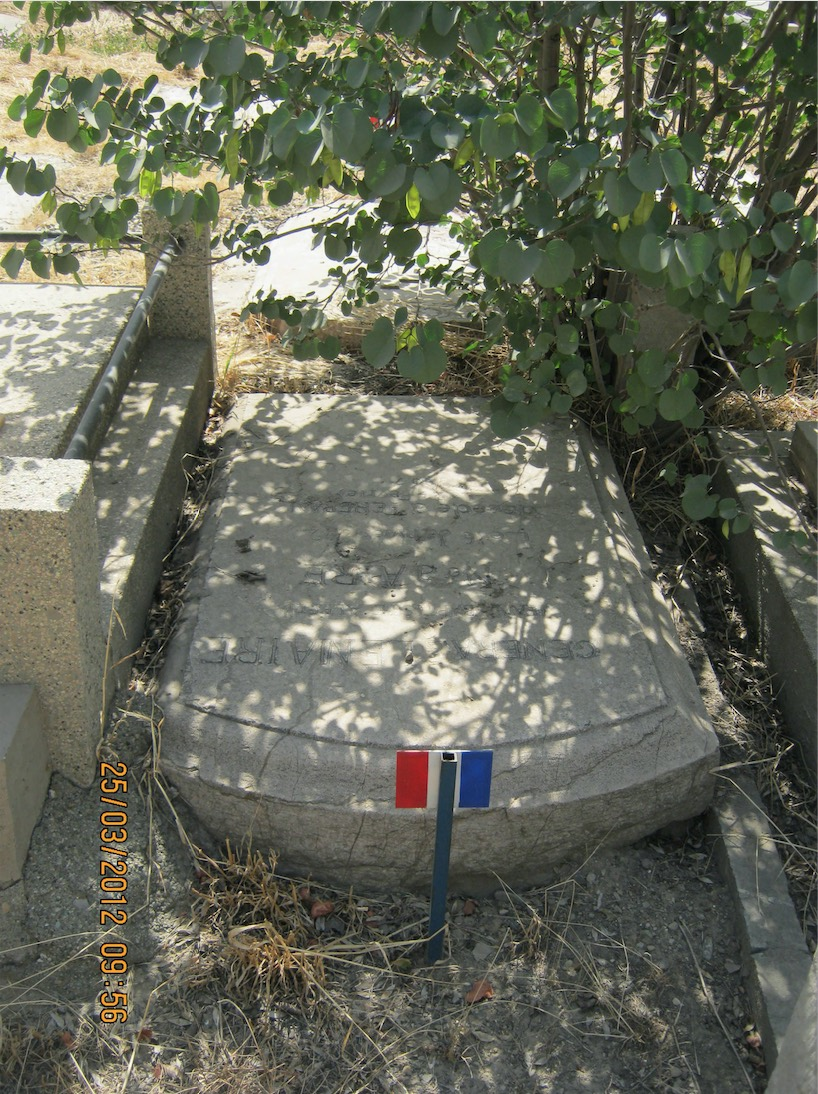
Tomb of Alfred Lemaire

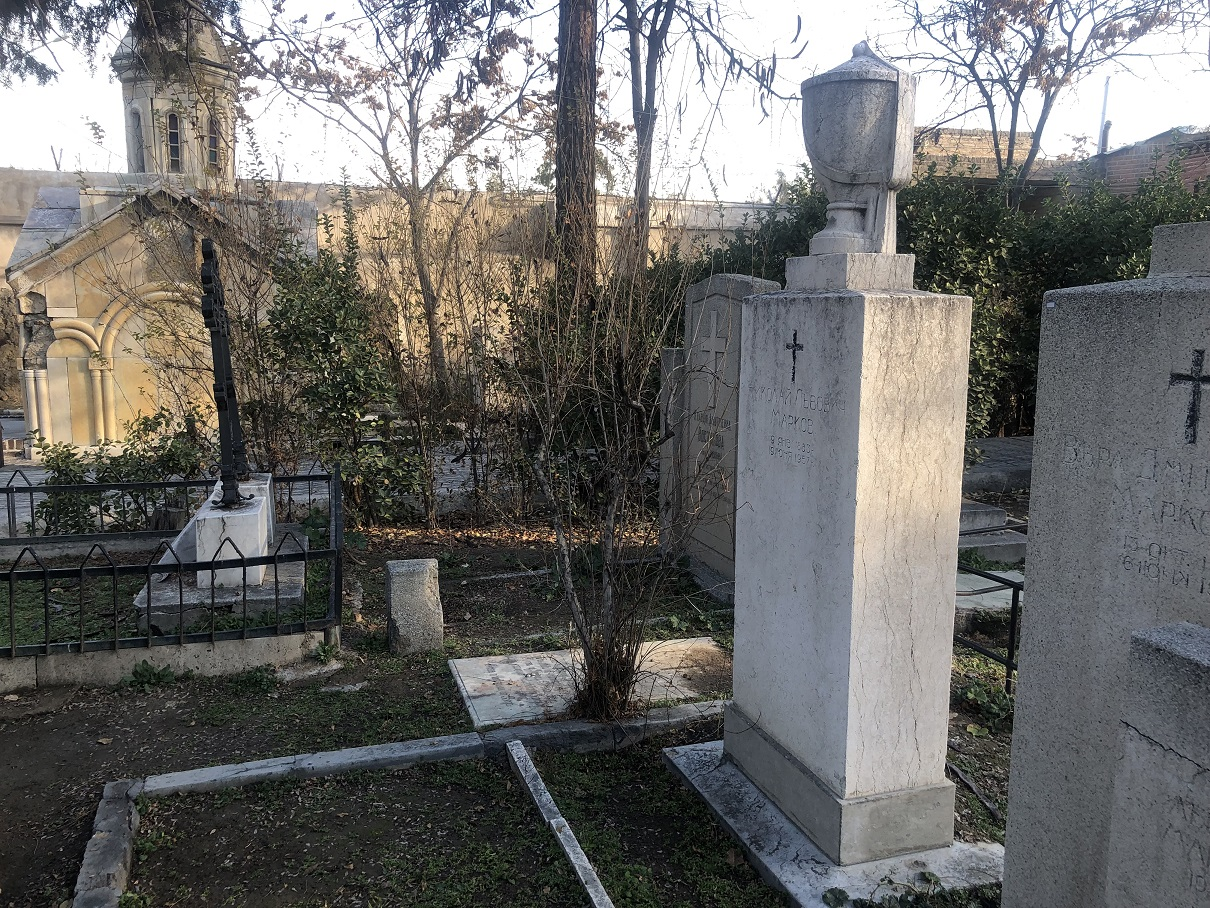
Tomb of Nikolai Markov

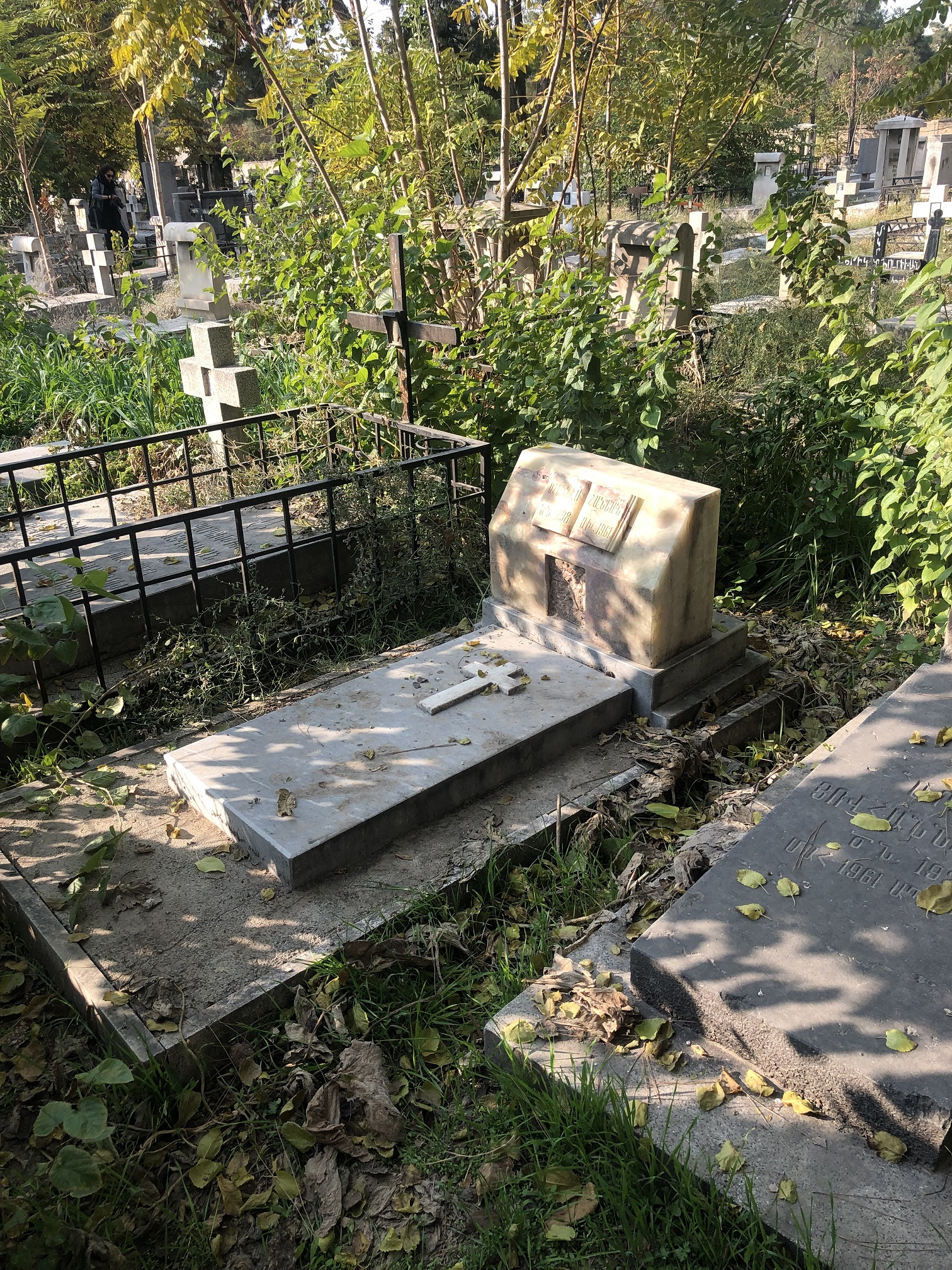
Tomb of Ovanes Ohanian

- Louis André Ernest Cloquet (1818–1855) – French physician in the court of Naser al-Din Shah
- Luigi Pesce (1828–1864) – Italian photographer
- Joseph Désiré Tholozan (1820–1897) – French physician
- Julius Gebauer (1846–1895) – a member of Austro-Hungarian Military Mission in Persia
- Alfred Jean Baptiste Lemaire (1842–1907) – French military musician and composer
- Conte de Monte Forte (fa) (1878–1916) – Austrian head of Tehran police department
- Minadora Khoshtaria (მინადორა ხოშტარია) (1881–1924) – wife of Akaki Khoshtaria (აკაკი ხოშტარია)
- Władysław Horodecki (1863–1930) – Polish architect
- Antoin Sevruguin (Անտուան Սևրուգին) (1840–1933) – Armenian-Iranian photographer
- Grish Danielian (Գրիշա խան Դանիելյան) (fa) (1886–1933) – military officer
- Vitali Sergeyev (Виталий Сергиев) (ru) (1874–1946) – Russian priest
- Vasili Dmitrievich Kargaleteli (ვასილ დიმიტრის ძე კარგარეთელი) (ru) (1880–1946) – Georgian military leader
- Vartan Salakhanian (Վարդան Սալախյան) (fa) (1931–1954) – political activist
- Grigor Mikeladze (გრიგორ მიქელაძე) (1898–1955) – Georgian military officer in the Imperial Iranian Army
- Nikolai Markov (Николай Львович Марков) (1882–1957) – Russian architect
- Ovanes Ohanian (Հովհաննես Օհանյան) (1896–1960) – film director, director of the first Iranian feature film
- Shahin Sakissian (Շահին Սարգսեան) (fa) (1910–1966) – playwright
- Sohrab Saginian (Զորա Սագինյան) (fa) (1883–1968) – politician
- Aram Garoné (Արամ Գառօնէ) (fa) (1905–1974) – author
- Markar Gharabegian (Մարգար Ավետիսի Ղարաբեկյան) (fa) (1901–1976) – poet and painter
- Jamshid A'lam (fa) (1901–1979) – senator
- Jeannette Mikhaili (fa) (1936–2006) – painter
- Anna Borkowska (d. 2008) – Polish-Iranian actress
- Helena Stelmach (fa) (1931–2017) – Polish-Iranian war veteran
- Peter Soleimanipour (fa) (1968–2018) – Russian-Iranian musician

== See also ==
- Christianity in Iran
- Polish Cemetery in Tehran
- Tehran War Cemetery
- List of Polish war cemeteries
- Nor Burastan Cemetery
- New Julfa Armenian Cemetery
- Golestan Shohada of Isfahan
- Golzar Shohada of Qom
