= Nikolay Markov =

Nikolay Markov may refer to:

- Nikolay Markov (sprinter) (born 1960), Bulgarian athlete
- Nikolai Markov (general), Soviet military commander in Baku Air Defence Army
- Nikolai Yevgenyevich Markov (1866–1945), Russian right-wing politician
- Nikolay Markov (footballer) (born 1985), Uzbekistani Russian footballer
- Nikolai Markov (architect) (1882–1957), Iranian architect of Russian descent
