= Ebrahim Moradi =

Iranian filmmaker (c.1899–1977)

- ابراهیم مرادی
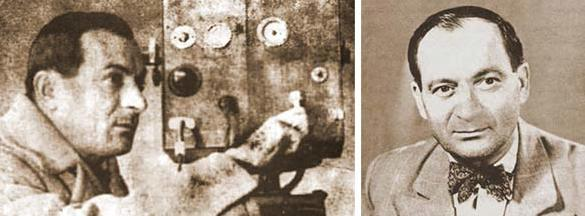
- Born: Between c. 1899 – c. 1907; Bandar-e Anzali, Qajar Iran
- Died: 1977; Tehran, Pahlavi Iran
- Burial place: Behesht-e Zahra, Tehran, Iran
- Occupations: Film director, screenwriter, film producer, cinematographer, actor

Ebrahim Moradi (Persian: ابراهیم مرادی; c. 1899—1977), was an Iranian filmmaker. He was early pioneer in the field of cinema in Iran and worked as a film director, film producer, screenwriter, cinematographer, and actor.

== Life and career ==
Ebrahim Moradi was born in Bandar-e Anzali, Qajar Iran, his exact date of birth is unknown and was sometime between c. 1899 – c. 1907. He attended the Rushdieh School of Bandar-e-Anzali, where one of his teachers was Armenian playwright Grigor Yeghikian.

In the 1910s Moradi joined the Jungle Movement of Gilan, an Iranian nationalist rebellion movement. By 1951, he fled to Moscow, Soviet Union, and became interested in the profession of photography. Additionally he studied film in Moscow.

When he returned to Iran, he attended the Parvareshgahe Artistiye Cinema (English: Cinema Artist Educational Center) founded by early Iranian Armenian filmmaker Ovanes Ohanian. He created Jahannama Studio in Iran, however was unable to bring all of his film equipment from the Soviet Union, so in some cases he had to make his own equipment. Moradi started filming A Brother's Revenge (1931) years before its release, and prior to the filming of Ovanes Ohanian's silent film Abi and Rabi (1930) which was the first Iranian feature-length film. He struggled with financing A Brother's Revenge (1931), in part because the film industry was not yet established in Iran.

For the last five years of his life, Moradi opened a school called Kodek Pod in Tehran for gifted and talented children. He died in 1977, in Tehran.

== Filmography ==
- A Brother's Revenge (1931), as director, producer, screenwriter, cinematographer
- Haji Agha, the Cinema Actor (1933), as assistant cinematographer
- The Fickle (1934), as director, producer, screenwriter, cinematographer
- The Back Breaker (1951), as director, producer, screenwriter, cinematographer
- The Grafting of Life (1953), as director, producer, screenwriter, cinematographer
- The Flawed Gem (1959), as director, screenwriter
