= Haji Agha, the Cinema Actor =

1933 Iranian film

Haji Agha, the Cinema actor
- Full film
- Directed by: Ovanes Ohanian
- Written by: Ovanes Ohanian
- Produced by: Ovanes Ohanians; Habibollah Morad; Maghasedzadeh Foroozin
- Starring: Habibollah Morad; Asia Qostanian; Zema Ohanians; Abbas khan Tahbaz
- Cinematography: Paolo Potomkin; Ebrahim Moradi
- Edited by: Ovanes Ohanian
- Production company: Pers Film
- Release date: 1933
- Running time: 75 minutes
- Country: Iran
- Language: silent

Haji Agha, the Cinema Actor (Persian: حاجی آقا آکتور سینما, romanized: Haji Agha Aktor-e Cinema) is a 1933 Iranian comedy film directed by Iranian-Armenian director, Ovannes Oganian and one of a few remaining Iranian silent films. This was Ohaninan's second film in Iran after the success of Abi and Rabi (1930), his first silent film. The film reflects the clash between tradition and modernity in Iranian society in the early 1930s. While Abi and Rabi (1930) did well commercially, Haji Agha Aktor-e Cinema did not succeed at the box office due to its technical shortcomings and the fact that its release coincided with the first Persian talkie, Dokhtar-e Lor.

The film tells the story of a film director (played by Ohanian himself) who is searching for a subject for his film, when he receives a suggestion to film Haji Agha, a wealthy conservative man. Haji's daughter, son-in-law, and servant help the director orchestrate a series of events that enable the director to film Haji in action. When the film is finished and Haji views it, he sees his own image on the screen and, enthralled by it, begins to appreciate the merits of cinema.

The lead role was cast by an Armenian actress.

== Plot ==
A film director Ovanes Ohanian looks for a subject for his movie and someone suggests that he secretly films Haji Agha. Haji is very rich and frowns upon cinema. Haji's daughter, son-in-law, and servant help the director with the film. Haji's watch gets lost, and he suspects his servant. Haji and his son-in-law start chasing him. At first, they tail him to the dentist's, and then they meet a fakir who claims he can find the lost watch. He does some strange things. The director photographs Haji all the time. Then Haji watches the film and becomes aware of the true merits of cinema.

== Cast ==
- Abbas-Gholi Edalatpour, as Puri
- Asia Ghostantin, as Parvin
- Habibollah Morad, as Haji Agha
- Ovanes Ohanian, as the director
- Zema Ohanian, as Pari
- Gholam-Hossein Sohrabi-Fard, as Monsieur Abi
- Abbas-Kahn Tahbaz, as Parviz

== Production ==
Shooting started in June 1932, and the camera used was a "Pathe" camera which was more than 20 years old.
