= The Grafting of Life =

1953 film

- پیوند زندگی
- Directed by: Ebrahim Moradi
- Written by: Ebrahim Moradi
- Produced by: Ebrahim Moradi
- Cinematography: Ebrahim Moradi
- Production company: Moradi Studio
- Release date: 24 November 1953
- Running time: 90 minutes
- Country: Iran
- Language: Persian

The Grafting of Life (Persian: پیوند زندگی, romanized: Peyvande zendegi, lit. 'The Connection of Life') is a 1953 Iranian film directed by Ebrahim Moradi.

== Cast ==
- Abdullah Basirat
- Reza Mirfattah
- Ebrahim Moradi

== Bibliography ==
- Mohammad Ali Issari. Cinema in Iran, 1900-1979. Scarecrow Press, 1989.
