= Akaki Khoshtaria =

- აკაკი ხოშტარია
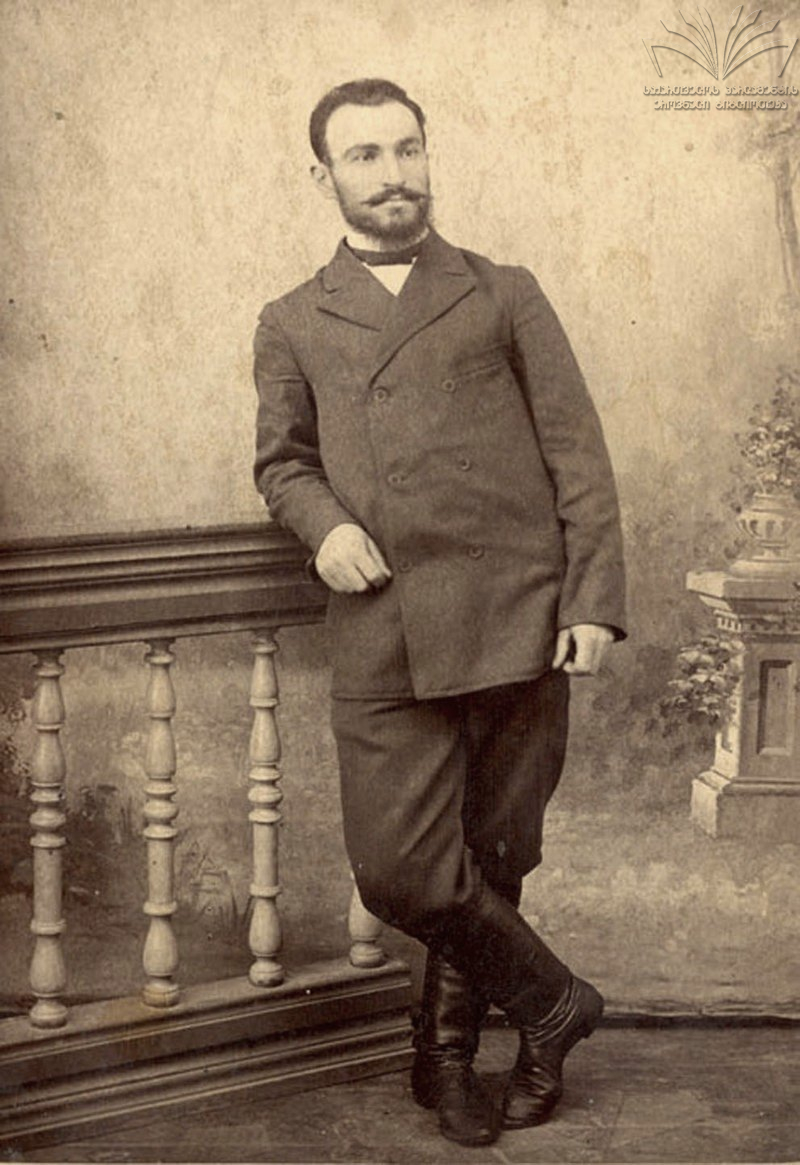
- Akaki Khoshtaria in 1932
- Born: 1873
- Died: 1932 (aged 58–59)
- Occupations: Entrepreneur, socialite, philanthropist

Akaki Khoshtaria (Georgian: აკაკი ხოშტარია, Russian: Акакий Мефодьевич Хоштария, Akakiy Mefodievich Khoshtariya) (1873 – 1932) was a Georgian entrepreneur, socialite, and philanthropist. His principal business interests centered on oil industry in Azerbaijan and northern Iran.

== Biography ==
Akaki Khoshtaria was born into the petty Georgian nobility, aznauri, near Abasha, then part of the Russian Empire. Educated as an agronomist in St. Petersburg, Khoshtaria made his fortune as a businessman and financier in the South Caucasus. He owned several assets in Tbilisi, sponsored cultural establishments in Georgia and provided bursaries for Georgian students abroad. He was particularly interested in oil fields in Azerbaijan and Northern Iran. During the Russian Revolution of 1917, he was close to pro-independence revolutionaries in Georgia and helped the government of the Democratic Republic of Georgia purchase a vessel for its embryonic navy. After the fall of the republic to a Bolshevik invasion in 1921, Khoshtaria emigrated to Paris, where he died in 1932 and was interred at the Père Lachaise Cemetery.

Khoshtaria's wife Minadora née Turkia (1881–1924) is buried at the Doulab Russian Orthodox Cemetery in Tehran. A mausoleum for her commissioned by Khoshtaria is influenced by the medieval Georgian church architecture and is the only Georgian Christian monument in Iran. Their daughter, Minadora (1918–1985), married, in Paris, in 1942, Mikhail Bagration-Mukhransky, a Georgian émigré and scion of the last princes of Mukhrani, who is the paternal uncle of Khétévane Bagration de Moukhrani, Georgia's ambassador to the Holy See from 2005 to 2014.

== Khoshtaria concessions in Iran ==
In 1916, Khoshtaria obtained from the Iranian government a 25-year concession to drill for oil in northern Iran. This was aided by the Russian military occupation of the region during World War I. In order to exploit his concessions Khoshtaria organized the Russo-Persian Oil Producing and Trading Company, Rupento. However, the war and the Russian Revolution prevented its immediate development and Khoshtaria sold his interests to the Anglo-Iranian Oil Company (AIOC) for £200,000 in 1920. The Iranian government refused to recognize the validity of this deal, leading to international dispute over the northern Iranian oil in the 1920s. In the touristic city of Bandar-e Anzali on the coast of the Caspian Sea in Iran's Gilan province, the preserved palace of Akaki Khoshtaria with its beautiful garden can still be visited. On the first floor is a military-navy museum, while the second floor features an exhibition of Akaki Khoshtaria's personal belongings.
