= Luigi Pesce =

Italian colonel and photographer

- Born: 1828; Naples, Kingdom of the Two Sicilies (now Italy)
- Died: 27 November 1864; Tehran, Iran
- Known for: photographer

Luigi Pesce (1828 – 27 November 1864) was a Colonel and photographer from Naples, Kingdom of the Two Sicilies, who traveled to Iran in 1848, during the reign of Naser al-Din Shah Qajar, to train Iranian infantry units. He died in 1864 (aged 35–36) , in Tehran, Iran and was buried beside his wife in Doulab Cemetery.

== Photographing Iran ==
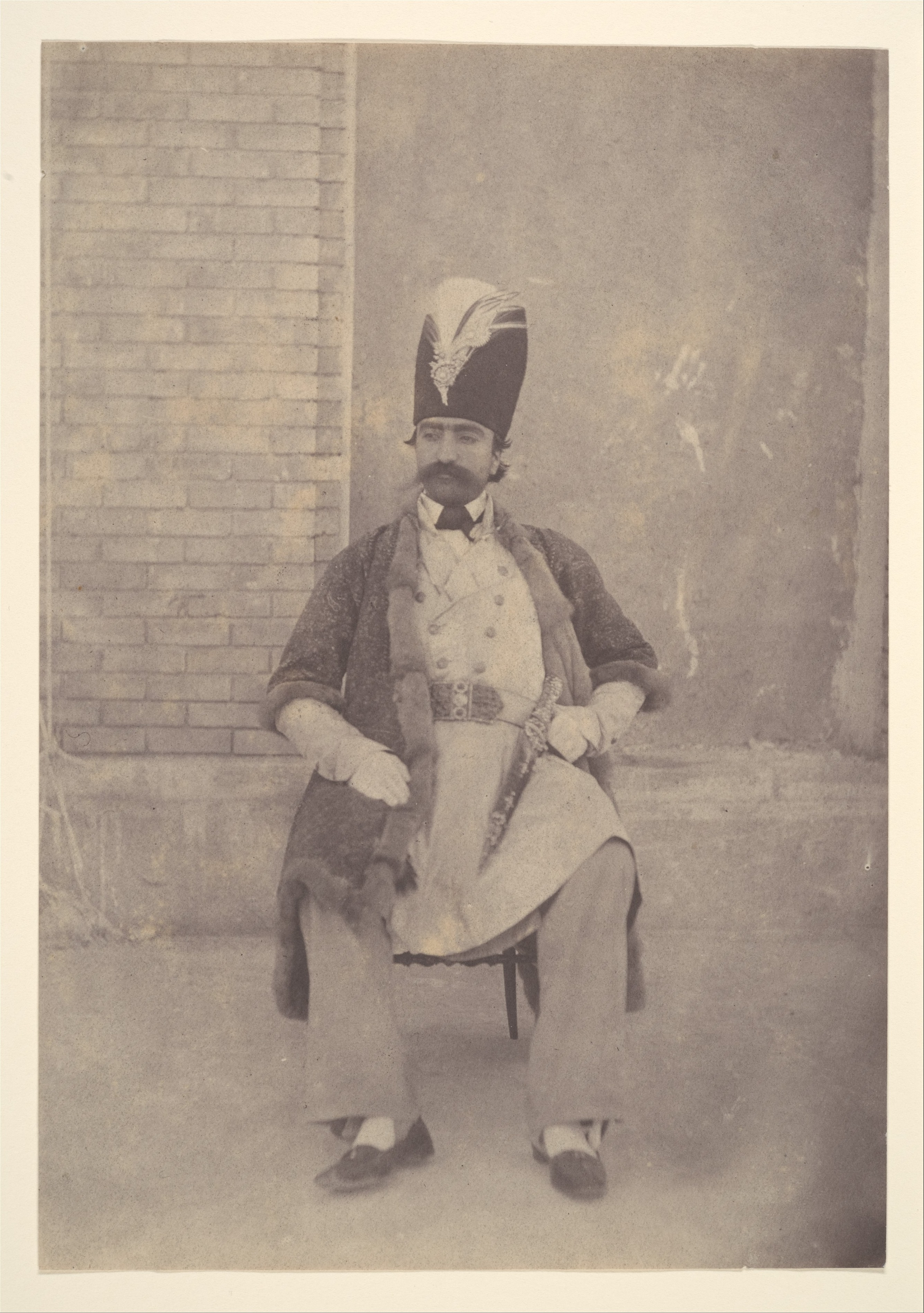
Photograph of Naser al-Din Shah by Pesce, 1855–58

An amateur photographer who spoke Persian, Turkish, and Greek, Pesce self-funded the expedition that produced the first photo collection of Iran's ancient monuments, and presented a copy to Naser al-Din Shah—who was himself a photographic enthusiast—on 29 April 1858. A second copy was also produced from the collection in the same year and was sent to Prince William I, King of Prussia. Another copy was donated to New York's Metropolitan Museum of Art; it contains 75 photographs and is probably the same album that was sent to the Prussian King.

The oldest pictures in this collection were taken between 1852 and 1855. There are three photos of Naser al-Din Shah during his younger years and one group picture in the collection. Most of the images show the architecture of Iran during the 1800s. The images hold a unique historical value and illustrate the lives of people from different social classes, including members of the royal court. Although few women have been captured in the photos, it clearly documents the existing social hierarchy.

Pesce's photos were shown at the World Harris Exhibition in 1867 and received an honorary award.

== Persepolis ==
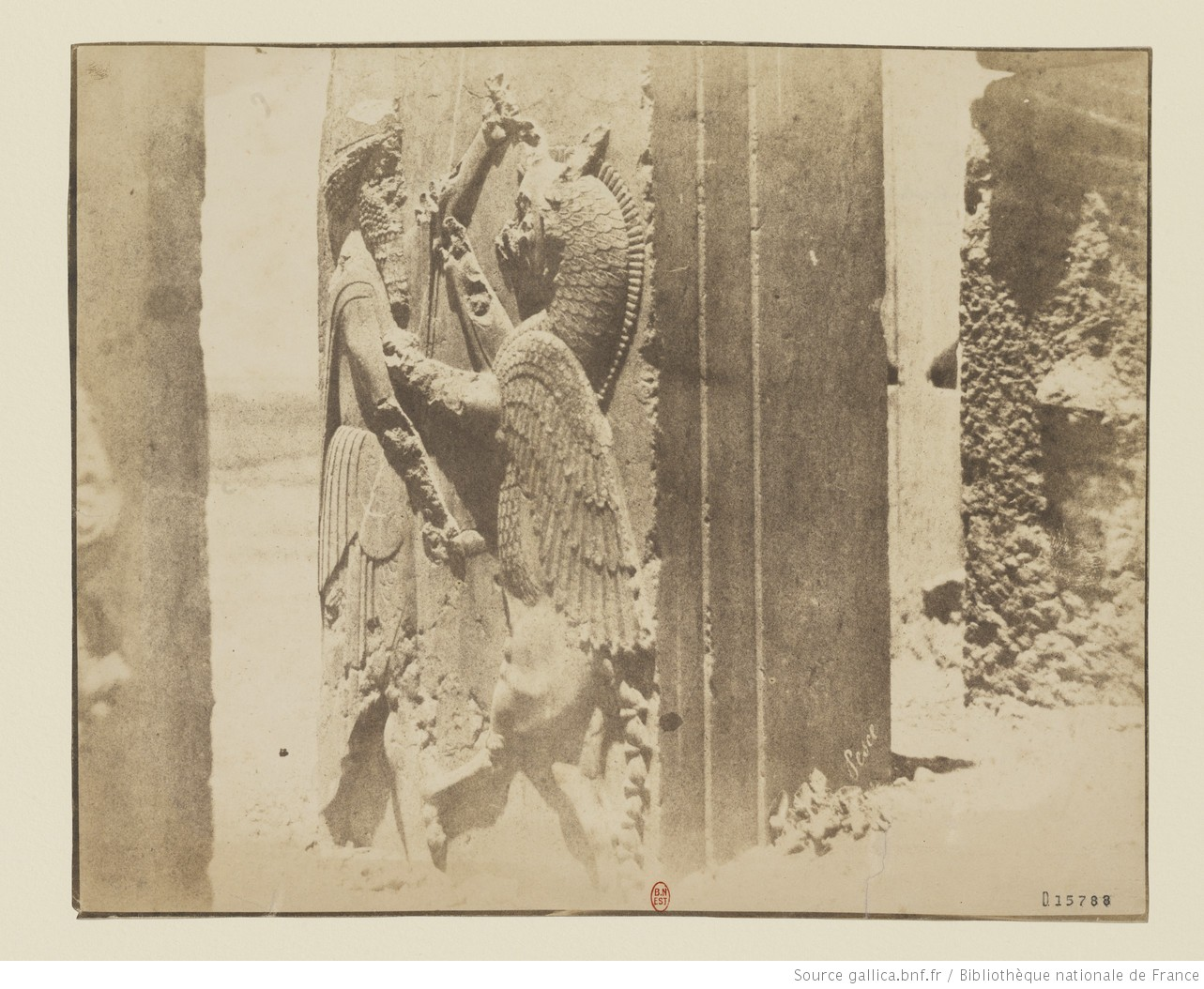
"View 20 – Persépolis. Relief de l'Apadana salle aux Cent colonnes"

Pesce is considered the first photographer to have captured images of Persepolis, Pasargadae and Naqsh-e Rustam. Naser al-Din Shah, who had sent daguerreotypist Jules Richard on an unsuccessful mission to photograph Persepolis in 1850, greatly appreciated Pesce's work. During his reign, he also paid other photographers to come to Iran and capture historical sites.

== See also ==
- Jane Dieulafoy
- Pascal Coste
- Eugène Flandin
