= Fakhr-ol-dowleh Mosque =

Shi'ite mosque in Tehran, Iran; Iran National Heritage List site

- مسجد فخرالدوله
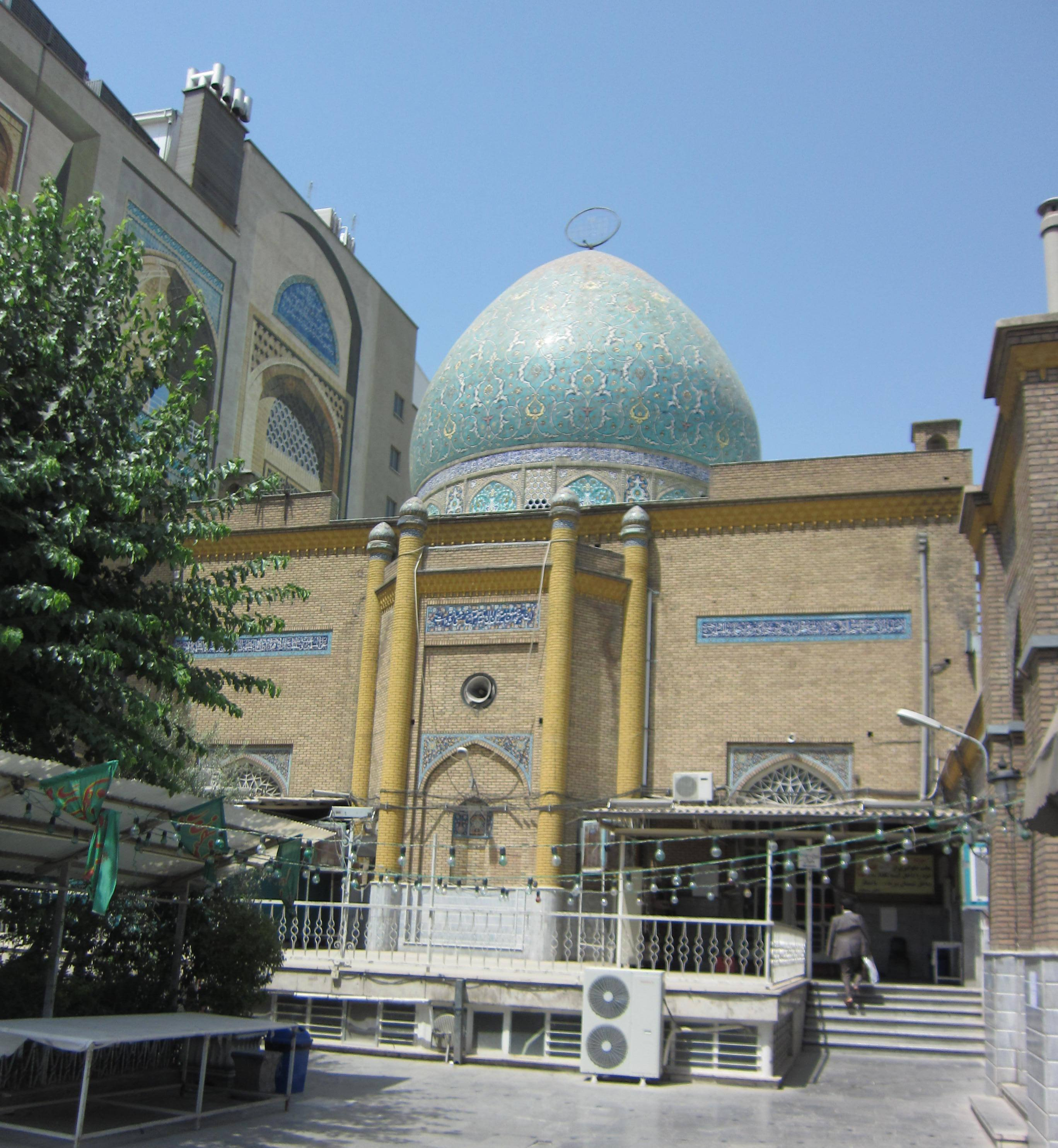
- Fakhr-ol-dowleh Mosque, with its half-octagonal entrance

- Location of the mosque in Tehran

Religion
- Affiliation: Shia Islam
- Ecclesiastical or organizational status: Mosque
- Status: Active

Location
- Location: Fakhr Mosque Alley and Moshki Street, Darvazeh Shemiran, Tehran, Tehran province
- Country: Iran
- Interactive map of Fakhr-ol-dowleh Mosque
- Coordinates: 35°41′54″N 51°26′14″E

Architecture
- Architect: Nikolai Markov
- Type: Mosque architecture
- Style: Pahlavi; Qajar; Persian
- Founder: Princess Fakhr-ol-dowleh
- Established: 1324 SH; 1364 AH (1944/1945 CE)
- Completed: 1328 SH; 1368 AH (1948/1949 CE)

Specifications
- Dome: One (maybe more)
- Minaret: Four
- Materials: Bricks; plaster; tiles

Iran National Heritage List
- Official name: Fakhr-ol-dowleh Mosque
- Type: Built
- Designated: 16 October 2004
- Reference no.: 11205
- Conservation organization: Cultural Heritage, Handicrafts and Tourism Organization of Iran

The Fakhr-ol-dowleh Mosque (Persian: مسجد فخرالدوله; Arabic: مسجد فخر الدولة) (Note: Also spelled as Fakhr al-Dawla Mosque and Fakhrodoleh Mosque.) also known as the Fakhr Mosque, originally named as the Amin-ol-dowleh Mosque (Persian: مسجد امین‌الدوله), is a Shi'ite mosque on Fakhrabad Street in the Shemiran Gate neighborhood of Tehran, in the province of Tehran, Iran. The mosque was designed by Nikolai Markov and completed in 1949 CE. Princess Fakhr-ol-Dowleh, a daughter of Mozaffar ad-Din Shah Qajar, was the founder of the mosque and named it after her father-in-law, Amin-ol-dowleh. However, the mosque now bears the name of its founder.

Some minor and major changes were made to the building over the years, and some parts of it have been damaged due to the construction in the front of the building, and the passing of subway trains from the nearby Darvazeh Shemiran Metro Station. The mosque was added to the Iran National Heritage List on 16 October 2004, administered by the Cultural Heritage, Handicrafts and Tourism Organization of Iran.

== History ==
In 1945, Fakhr-ol-Dowleh, who was married to Amin-ol-Dowleh junior, son of Mirza Ali Khan Amin-ol-Dowleh, decided to build a mosque named after Mirza Ali Khan in front of her house. However, the name of the mosque, and the neighborhood it's located in, changed to Fakhr-ol-Dowleh over time. She appointed Russian architect Nikolai Markov, one of the most notable architects in Iran at the time, to design and build the mosque. Construction of the building took four years to complete.

Ayatollah Haj Mirza Khalil Kamarah'i served as imam at the mosque for over thirty years.

== Architecture ==
Built during the second Pahlavi era, the mosque design is a combination of the Qajar and Persian architectural styles visible in its original geometry and composition, based on a plan of Byzantine temples. The building façade consists of bricks and marquetry mosaics and the half-octagonal-shaped entrance has four small minarets on each corner. The main structure consists of a cube-shaped main building with two shabestans inside. The dome of the building originally wasn't very high; the current taller dome was built in subsequent years. Some parts of the current structure, such as the taller dome, added ayeneh-kari inside the mosque, and the women's section in the front yard, were added to the building later.

=== Damage to the building ===
In January 2011, a historic building near the Fakhr-ol-Dowleh Mosque, named the Building of Flags, considered the first apartment hotel in Iran, was due to be registered on the National Heritage List. This building was demolished before the registration in order to build a new commercial complex. Part of the construction site for the high-rise complex impinged on the front of the historic mosque, even though construction of structures higher than 7 metres (23 ft) adjacent to registered historic and heritage buildings is forbidden by regulations for the protection of the cultural heritage in Iran.

Also, subway trains pass under the mosque every two minutes. The tremors caused by passing trains have cracked the dome of the mosque, and some mosaics on the facade have fallen off the walls.

== See also ==
- Shia Islam in Iran
- List of mosques in Iran
