= Khalil Kamarah'i =

Iranian historian, philosopher and writer (1898–1984)

Ayatollah Haj Mirza Khalil Kamarah'i
- خلیل کمره‌ای
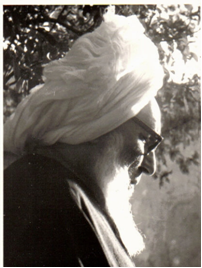
- Portrait of Mirza Khalil Kamarei, 1973

Personal life
- Born: 1898 Ferneq, Iran
- Died: 11 October 1984 (aged 85–86) Tehran, Iran
- Resting place: Fatima Masumeh Shrine, Qom

Religious life
- Religion: Islam
- Profession: Author, researcher, philosopher, imam

Muslim leader
- Teacher: Abdul-Karim Ha'eri Yazdi
- Previous post: Imam, Fakhr-ol-dowleh Mosque; Lecturer, University of Theology, Tehran

Ayatollah Haj Mirza Khalil Kamarah'i (Persian: خلیل کمره‌ای, romanized: Khalīl Kamarah’ī; 1898, in Ferneq – 1984, in Tehran, Iran) was an Iranian author, researcher and philosopher of contemporary theology that sought to unite the Muslim sects supporting his cause.

He studied under Abdul-Karim Ha'eri Yazdi in Arak and Qom. He continued his studies of various Islamic subjects and philosophy throughout his life. He worked with the administration in the Vatican City on various philosophical questions, which he later released in a separate book. He travelled to Cairo on behalf of Seyyed Hossein Borujerdi and Mahmud Shaltut, the Grand Mufti and dean of Al-Azhar University Sheikh, for fatwa. He was an imam for the Jamaat of Fakhr-ol-dowleh Mosque in Tehran for more than three decades and taught at the University of Theology in Tehran for five years.

== Death ==
He died in his home in Tehran, on Thursday 11 October 1984 after two years' illness. He was buried in Qom, near the Fatima Masumeh Shrine.
