= Jean-Baptiste Feuvrier =

French physician (1842–1926)

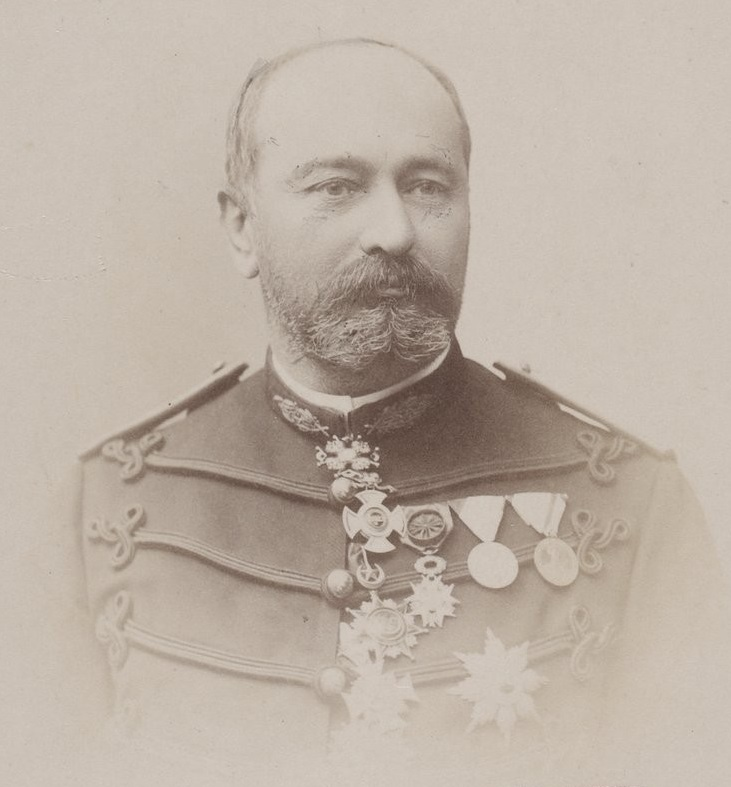
Feuvrier as pictured by Eugène Pirou (between 1890 and 1899)

Jean-Baptiste Feuvrier (called Joannès; 6 October 1842 – 29 November 1926) was a French military physician, who, from August 1889 to October 1892, served as the personal physician to Naser al-Din Shah Qajar (r. 1848–1896), Shah of Qajar Iran. He wrote a travelogue about his life in Iran, the Trois ans à la cour de Perse. Prior to his appointment in Iran, he served as a personal physician to Prince Nicholas I of Montenegro (r. 1860–1918).

== Biography ==
Feuvrier was born in Saulx, Haute-Saône to François Antoine, a military veterinary surgeon. In 1861–1865, he attended the Military School of Hygiene in Strasbourg, and earned a post-doc at Val-de-Grâce in Paris. Feuvrier served in Algeria (1861–1865) and Colmar (1869). He participated in the Franco-Prussian War.

Feuvrier then served as a personal physician to Prince Nicholas I of Montenegro (r. 1860–1918). He also participated under Nicholas I in the Herzegovina uprising (1875–1877) directed against the Ottoman Empire.

Feuvrier succeeded another Frenchman, Joseph Désiré Tholozan, as Naser al-Din Shah Qajar's personal physician. Though his knowledge of the Persian language and culture was limited (learned mainly on the spot), his travelogue provides invaluable first-hand information on an important period during the Qajar era. It is a major source of information in relation to the Tobacco Concession and the Tobacco Protest. Through his personal interest in Persian culture, Feuvrier's travelogue also provides important information on Iran's archaeology, architecture, urbanism, economy, and social life.

He was awarded the Order of the Lion and the Sun (1st class with green sash) and the Légion d’Honneur (chevalier, 1875; officier, 1890). In addition to his native French, and Persian, Feuvrier held linguistic abilities in Serbian, Italian, Russian, English, and German. He died at Saulx.

== Sources ==
- Calmard, Jean (1999). "Feuvrier, Jean-Baptiste". In Yarshater, Ehsan (ed.). Encyclopædia Iranica. Vol. IX/6: Festivals VIII–Fish. London and New York: Routledge & Kegan Paul. pp. 569–571. ISBN 978-0-933273-34-4.
