= Ovanes Ohanian =

Iranian Armenian filmmaker, scientist (1896–1961)

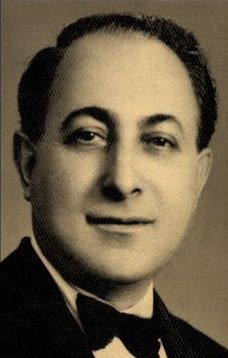
- Ovanes Ohanian
- Born: Ovanes Grigory Ohanian; 8 October 1896; Mashhad, Qajar Iran
- Died: September 1961 (aged 64); Tehran, Iran
- Resting place: Doulab Cemetery
- Other names: Mojdeh, O.G. Ohanian, Hovhannes Ohanian
- Education: Moscow Film School
- Occupations: Filmmaker, educator, school founder, screenwriter, inventor, scientist, physician
- Years active: 1929–1959
- Notable work: Abi and Rabi, Haji Agha, the Cinema Actor
- Spouse(s): Zemma Catcharoo (divorced); Ashraf Karimzadeh (m. 1940)
- Children: 3

Ovanes Ohanian (Armenian: Յովհաննէս Օհանեան, Persian: اوانس اوهانیانس; October 8, 1896 – September 1960) was an Iranian Armenian filmmaker, screenwriter, and educator. He also worked as a scientist, inventor, founder, and physician. Ohanian was the first filmmaker in Iran, and established the first film school in Iran in 1925. His film, Abi and Rabi (1930) was Iran's first feature-length movie. He also founded the first acting school in India. He used the name O.G. Ohanian, and the pseudonym Mojdeh.

== Early life and education ==
Ovanes Grigory Ohanian was born in 1896 in Mashhad, Qajar Iran, the son of Grigory. He was fluent in seven languages.

Ohanian was a graduate of the Faculty of Commerce in Tashkent (1919), Law in Ashgabat (1920), Moscow Film School (also known as the Gerasimov Institute of Cinematography; 1925–1928), Doctor of Cinema (1932), Doctor of Science (1941), and Doctor of Medicine (1953).

== Career ==
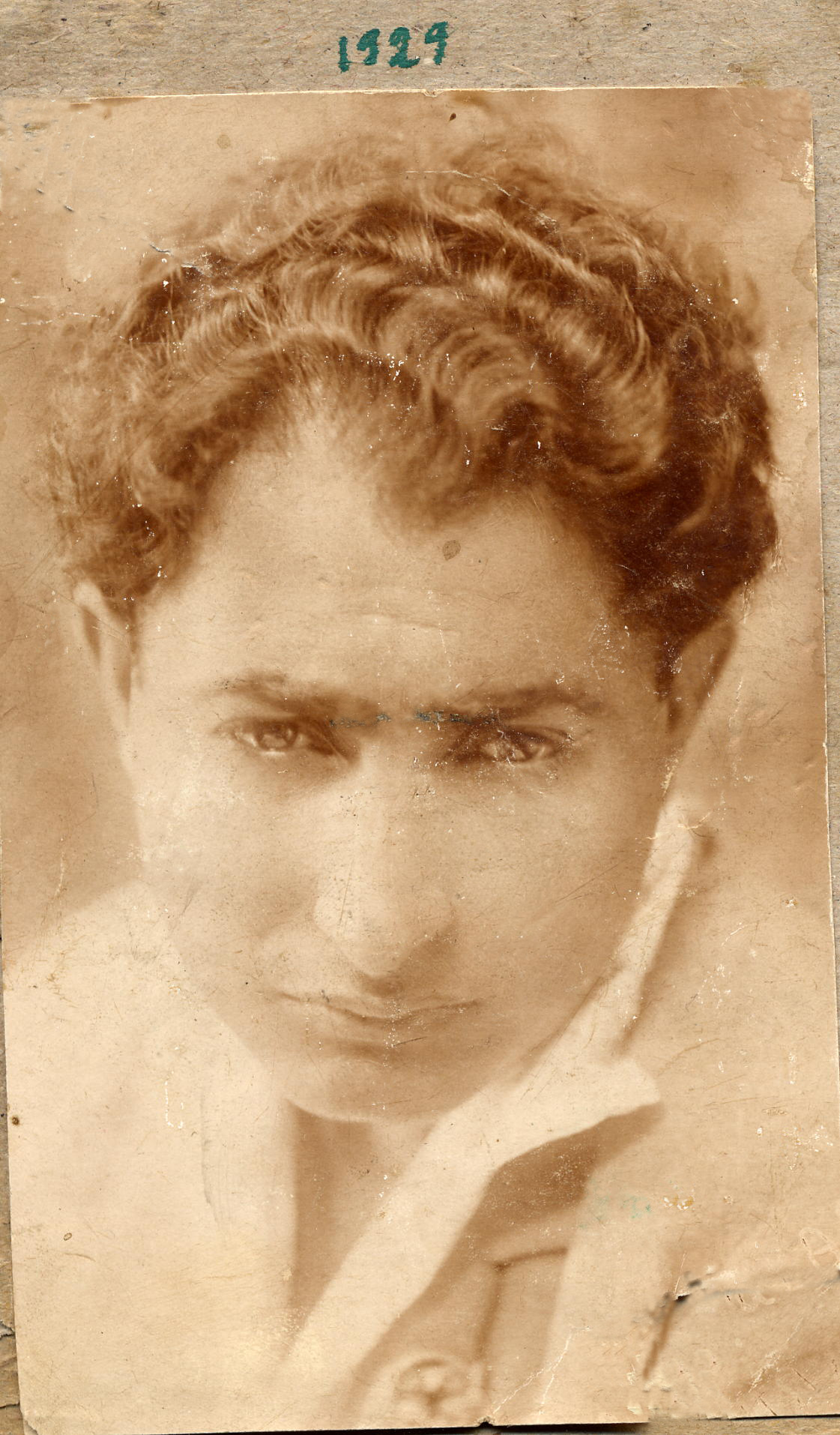
Ohanian (1929)

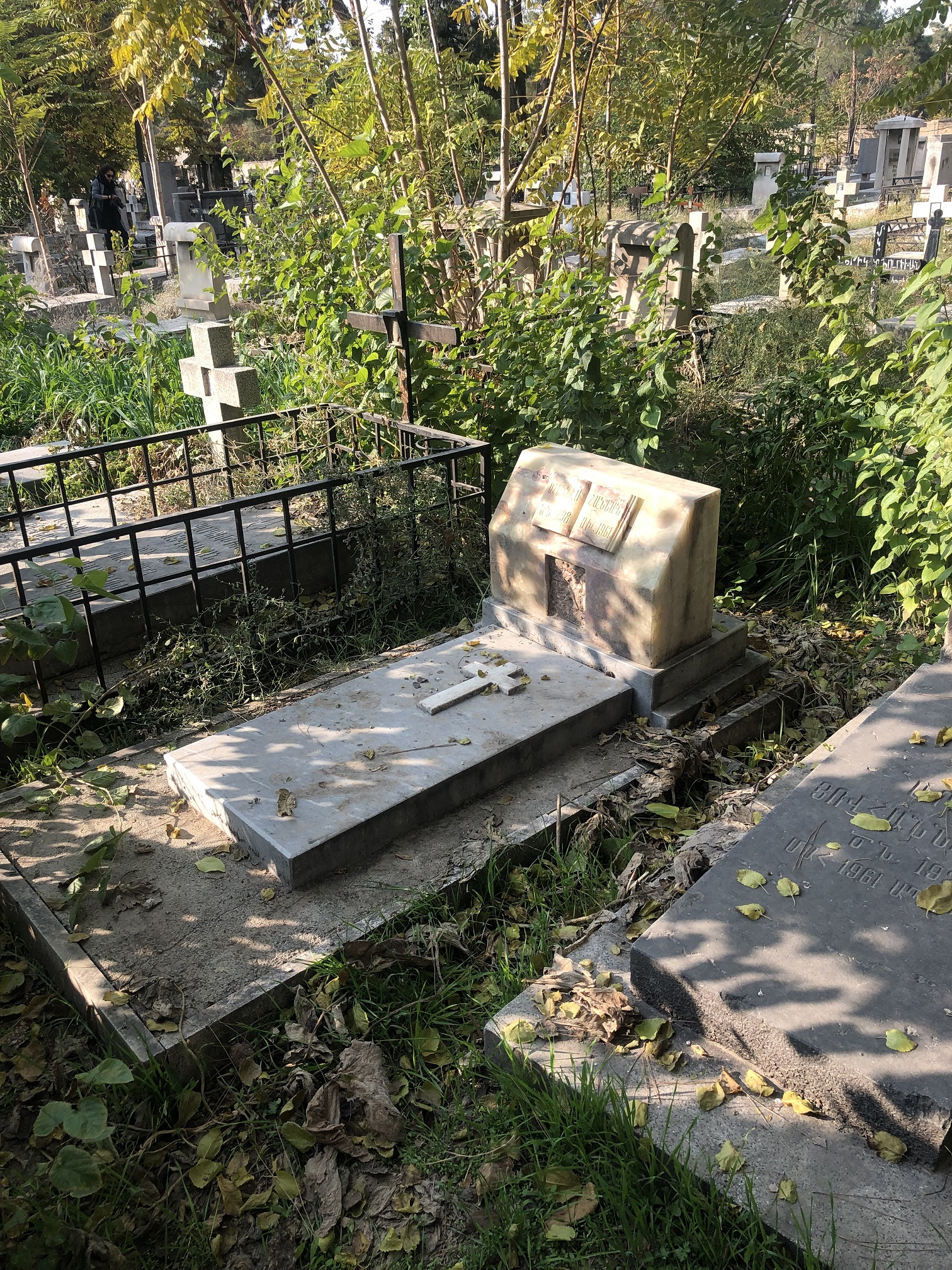
Ohanian's grave at Doulab Cemetery

In 1924, he went to India to form the first film school in India. Amongst his first graduates was Raj Kapoor. After facing many difficulties, he went to Iran in 1925 to form the first film acting and technical school in Tehran; his goal was to establish a film industry in the country.

Since he found it impossible to initiate any production without professionals in the field, Ohanian decided to begin a film school in Tehran. Within five years he managed to run the first session of the school under the name: Parvareshgahe Artistiye Cinema (English: Cinema Artist Educational Center). Acting and performance, rather than film production, were the cornerstones of the institution. Notable students from the Parvareshgahe Artistiye Cinema include filmmaker Ebrahim Moradi.

After five months, with a few of his graduates and the financial help of a theatre owner, Ohanian directed Abi and Rabi (1930). The film, lensed by Mo'tazedi, was shot silent on 35mm black and white stock and ran 1,400 meters long. The main actors were Abolghassem Ashti, Ahmad Dehghan and M. Ali Ghotbi. Abi and Rabi was received well by critics and the public. Unfortunately the only copy of the film burnt to ashes two years after its release in a fire accident in Cinema Mayak, one of the first theaters in Tehran.

In 1933, Ovanes released the movie Haji Agha Actor (sometimes translated as Haji Agha, the Cinema Actor). Ovanes directed and starred in the movie as the movie-directing suitor of Mr. Haji's daughter. The film was a reflexive construction about a traditionalist who is suspicious of cinema, but by the end of story recognizes the significance of film art. The film did not do well at the box office. Not only were there technical shortcomings, but additionally, the release of the first Persian talkie (produced in India) diminished its prospects for profit.

== Late life and death ==
After the failure of his second film, Ohanian could not find any support for further activities. He left Iran for India and continued his academic career in Calcutta. Subsequently he returned to Iran in 1947. He created the film White Rider (1954), which did not succeed. He also wrote a screenplay titled, The Coup of 1299 (1959), which he was unable to turn into a film.

He died from a heart attack in September 1961 in Tehran, in relative obscurity. He is buried at Doulab Cemetery in Tehran.

== Filmography ==
Films by Ohanian
Year	Title	Role	Notes
1930	Abi and Rabi (Persian: آبی و رابی, romanized: Abi-o-Rabi)	director, screenwriter, lead actor	The first silent feature film in the history of Iranian cinema, and it contained an all-male cast
1933	Haji Agha, the Cinema Actor (Persian: حاجی آقا آکتور سینما, romanized: Haji Agha Aktor-e Cinema)	director, screenwriter, producer, editor	The lead role was cast by an Armenian actress.
1954	White Rider (Persian: سوار سفید)	screenwriter, actor	
