= Polish War Cemetery in Tehran =

Cemetery in Tehran, Iran

Polish Cemetery
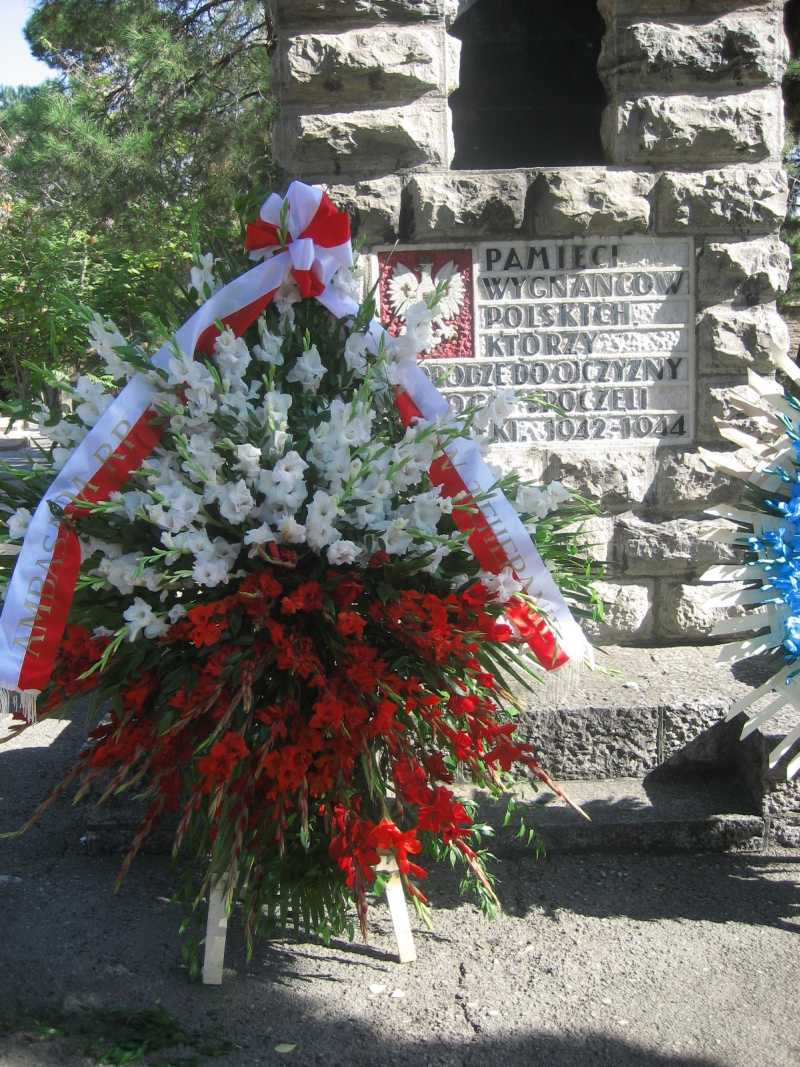
- Interactive map of Polish Cemetery

Details
- Established: 1855
- Location: Ahang Expressway, 10th Farvardin street
- Country: Iran
- Owned by: Ministry of Cultural Heritage, Tourism and Handicrafts
- Size
- No. of interments: 22,000

The Polish War Cemetery in Tehran is a historical cemetery situated in the eastern suburbs of Tehran, Iran, part of Doulab Christian Cemetery of Tehran. It was made during Evacuation of Polish civilians from the USSR in World War II. This cemetery contains the remains of 2,192 graves of the Polish civilians who perished due to sickness during their transport to the Middle East.

== Overview ==
There are two memorials in this cemetery. The first, older one, is located in the center of the Polish section, built in honor of the victims of this historic migration, and the other, dated 2017, is a stony statue of the Polish White Eagle, with the left of the names of the refugees who drowned in the Caspian Sea, and to the right of it are the names of those buried in the cemeteries of Khorramshahr and Qazvin and in over cemeteries in Iran.

== See also ==
- Polish Cemetery at Monte Cassino
- Polish Military Cemetery at Casamassima
