= A Brother's Revenge =

1931 Iranian film

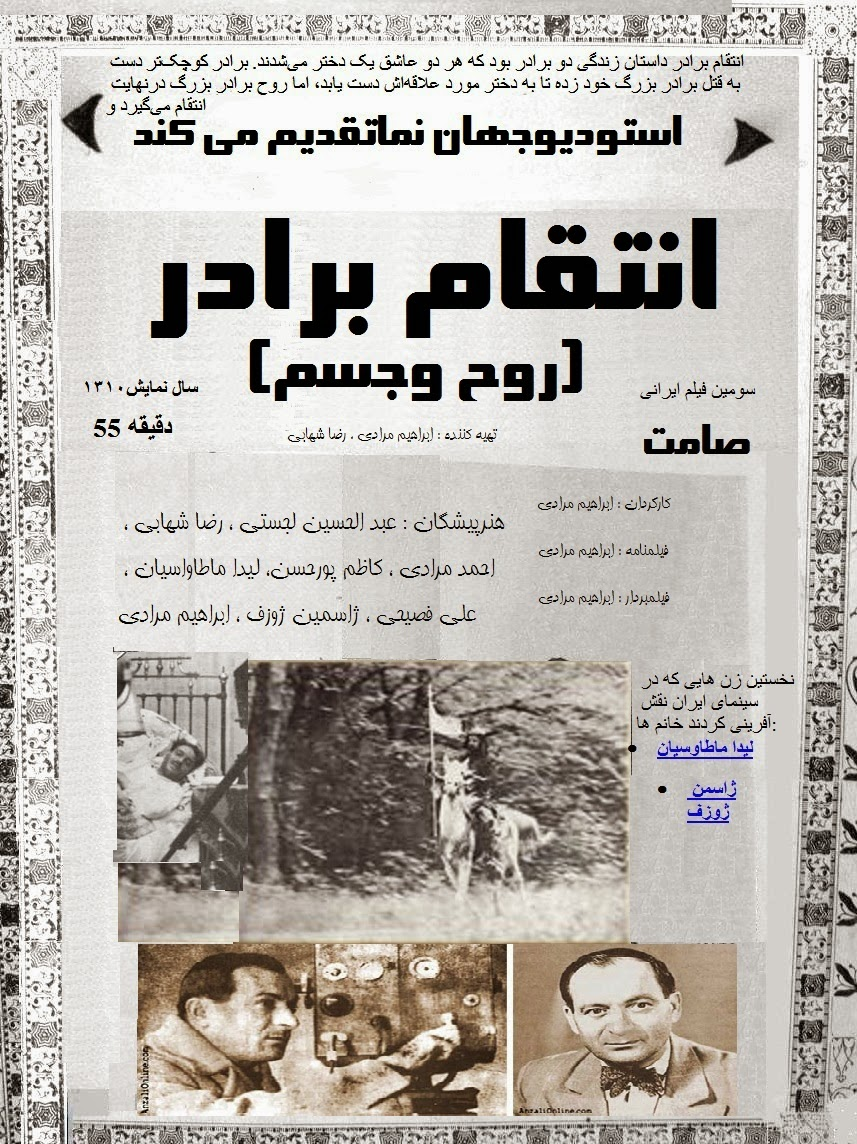
- Directed by: Ebrahim Moradi
- Written by: Ebrahim Moradi
- Produced by: Ebrahim Moradi; Reza Shahabi
- Starring: Abdolhossein Lojasti; Reza Shahabi; Ahmad Moradi; Kazem Poor Hassan; Lida Matavesian
- Release date: 1931
- Running time: 55 minutes (as written on the poster)
- Country: Iran
- Language: Silent film

A Brother's Revenge, or Revenge on the Brother (Persian: انتقام برادر, romanized: Enteghm-e baradar) is a 1931 Iranian silent drama film directed by Ebrahim Moradi, and starring Abdolhossein Lojasti, Reza Shahabi, Ahmad Moradi, Kazem Poor Hassan and Lida Matavesian. It was the first Iranian film to feature women in the cast.
