= The Back Breaker =

- Directed by: Ebrahim Moradi
- Written by: Ebrahim Moradi
- Produced by: Ebrahim Moradi
- Cinematography: Ebrahim Moradi
- Production company: Moradi Studio
- Release date: 21 June 1951
- Running time: 78 minutes
- Country: Iran
- Language: Persian

The Back Breaker (Persian: Kamarshekan) is a 1951 Iranian comedy film directed by Ebrahim Moradi.

== Cast ==
- Abdullah Basirat
- Ahmad Emami
- Reza Mirfattah
- Ebrahim Moradi
- Akhtar Partovi
- Asghar Simyari

== Bibliography ==
- Mohammad Ali Issari. Cinema in Iran, 1900-1979. Scarecrow Press, 1989. ISBN 9780810821422.
