= Fickle Hill, California =

Locality in Humboldt County, California, United States

Coordinates: 40°51′49″N 124°02′34″W

Fickle Hill is a locality in Humboldt County, California. It lies at an elevation of 1,115 feet (340 m). Fickle Hill addresses at lower elevations may be in the city limits of Arcata, while those higher up the mountain are unincorporated, and use the Arcata 95521 zip code.
