= The Fickle =

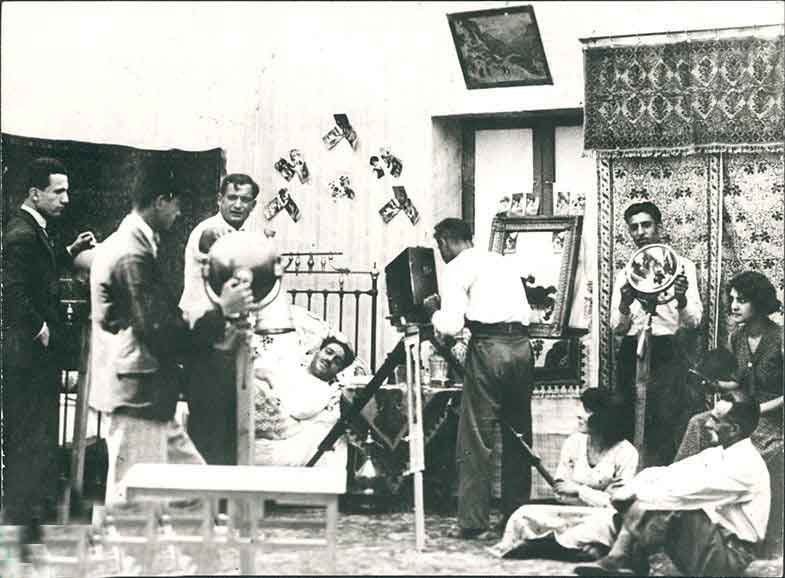
- Directed by: Ebrahim Moradi
- Written by: Ebrahim Moradi
- Produced by: Ahmad Gorji; Ahmad Dehghan
- Starring: Mohammad Ali Ghotbi; Ahmad Dehghan; Ahmad Gorji; Qodsi Partowi; Touran Veisi
- Release date: 1934
- Running time: 90 minutes
- Country: Iran
- Language: Persian

The Fickle (Persian: بوالهوس, romanized: Bolhavass) is a 1934 Iranian romance drama film directed by Ebrahim Moradi and starring Mohammad Ali Ghotbi, Ahmad Dehghan, Ahmad Gorji, Qodsi Partowi and Touran Veisi.
