= William Fickle =

American politician (1943–2016)

Member of the U.S. House of Representatives from Missouri's 17th district

Missouri House of Representatives
- Incumbent
- Assumed office 1975

Personal details
- Born: 1943 Kansas City, Missouri, US
- Died: 2016 (aged 72–73) home near Weatherby Lake, Missouri, US
- Party: Democratic
- Spouse: Jane Thompson Jones
- Children: 2 (1 son, 1 daughter)
- Occupation: attorney

William Dick Fickle (October 29, 1943 - May 12, 2016) was an American Democratic politician who served in the Missouri House of Representatives. He was born in Kansas City, Missouri, and was educated in the public schools of Platte County, Westminster College, and University of Missouri-Columbia. On November 29, 1969, he married Jane Thompson Jones at Mercer Island, Washington. He served in the United States Army between 1968 and 1970. Fickle worked as a prosecuting attorney and a private law practice attorney until he retired in 2012.
