= Joseph Désiré Tholozan =

French physician and epidemiologist (1820–1897)

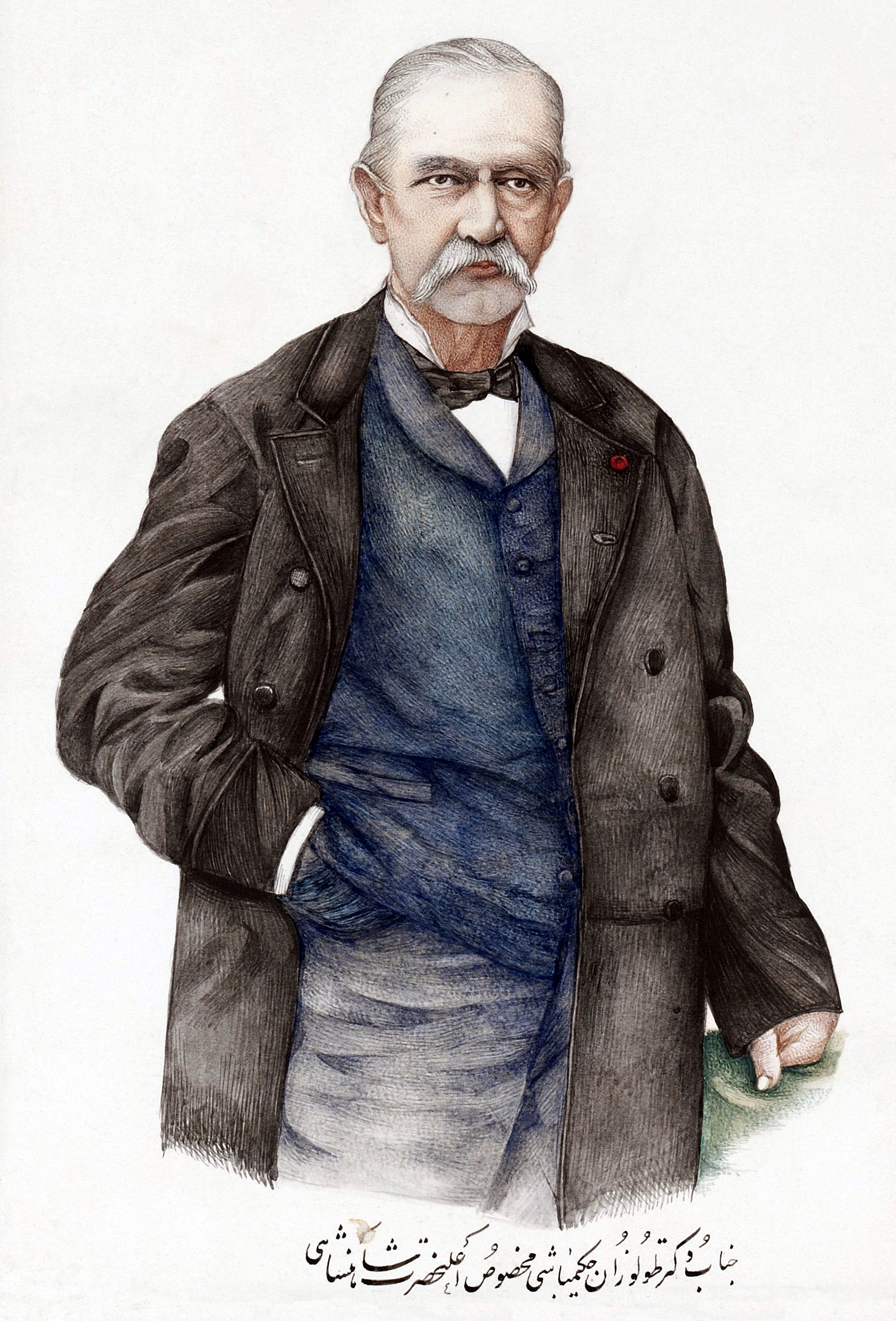
- Born: 9 October 1820; Diego Garcia, Mauritius
- Died: 30 July 1897 (aged 76); Tehran, Qajar Iran

Joseph Désiré Tholozan (9 October 1820 in Diego Garcia, Mauritius – 30 July 1897 in Tehran, Iran) was a Franco-Mauritian physician. A pioneer in epidemiology, he was notably the personal physician to Naser al-Din Shah Qajar for more than 30 years.

== Life ==
Joseph Désiré Tholozan was born in 1820 at Diego Garcia, a small atoll in Chagos Archipelago situated in the Indian Ocean, to French parents. He was the eldest of four children. He began his studies at Port Louis alongside Charles-Édouard Brown-Séquard before continuing to the Lycée Thiers in Marseille.

He then entered the Marseille School of Medicine, led by François Cauvière, a close relative then to Paris where he defended his thesis in 1843.

He then entered the Military Health Service and became, in 1852, the first associate professor of medicine at the Hospital Val-de-Grâce. He also participated in the Crimean campaign in 1854 and 1855, where he made numerous observations on cholera.

He was then called into Qajar Iran in 1858 to become the personal physician of Naser al-Din Shah Qajar. He moved there and got married in 1866 to Iphigenia Pisani, from a prominent family from Constantinople. Professor Tholozan trained numerous Iranian physicians and performed important observations on the epidemiology of the plague, cholera and other infectious diseases such as the Asian relapsing fever.

Commander of the Legion of Honor and elected correspondent of the Academy of Sciences and the Medical Academy, Tholozan also played an important role in Franco-Iranian diplomatic relations accompanying the Shah during his three trips to Europe.

He was followed by another French physician called Jean-Baptiste Feuvrier or Joannès Feuvrier.

The circumstances of his death in 1897 in Tehran remain unclear and could be the result of a poisoning ordered by Mozaffar ad-Din Shah Qajar.

== Notes and references ==
- This page is based on information from the French Wikipedia page for Tholozan as well as Encyclopædia Iranica.

== See also ==
- France–Iran relations
