= Nikolai Markov (architect) =

Iranian architect

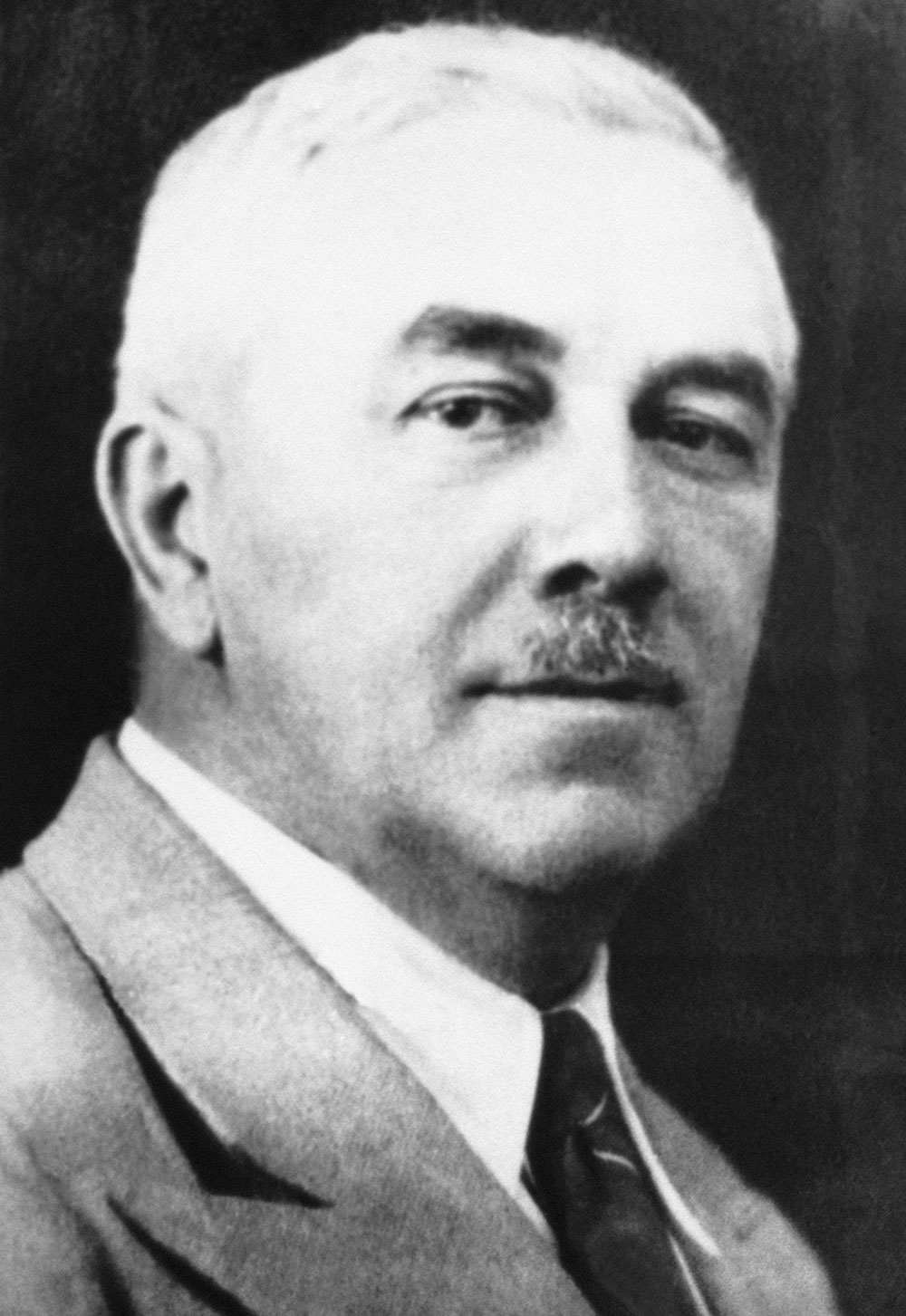
- Born: 9 January 1883; Tbilisi, Russian Empire (now Georgia)
- Died: 19 November 1957 (aged 74); Tehran, Imperial State of Iran
- Resting place: Doulab Cemetery, Tehran
- Education: Imperial Academy of Arts; Saint Petersburg University
- Occupation: Architect
- Buildings: Tehran Municipality Palace; Alborz High School; Holy Mother of God Church, Tehran; Fakhr al-Dawla Mosque; Qasr Prison; Jeanne d'Arc School

Nikolai Lvovich Markov (Russian: Николай Львович Марков, Persian: نیکولای مارکف, 9 January 1883 – 19 November 1957) was a Russian architect working in Iran.

== Biography ==
Nikolai Markov was born in Tiflis and was educated at the Imperial Academy of Arts in St. Petersburg and at the Persian Department of the Oriental Faculty of Saint Petersburg University.

Prior to his decisive settling in Iran, Markov was a high-ranking member of the Imperial Russian army, and fought in the Caucasus against the Bolsheviks under Colonel Nikolai Baratov, the commander of the Russian forces in Iran and to whose staff he was attached, and had served with the fanatically anti-Bolshevik Major-General Lazar Bicherakhov, another one of Baratov's senior officers. A supporter of the White movement, in the years around and after the Bolshevik Revolution he served as a captain in the Persian Cossack Brigade under General Vsevolod Starosselsky.

Markov later worked for the Municipality of Tehran where he built many buildings. Amongst his works are the Alborz High School, the Post Office and Telecommunications Center of Tehran, factories, and a mosque. He was buried at the Doulab Cemetery.

== Gallery ==
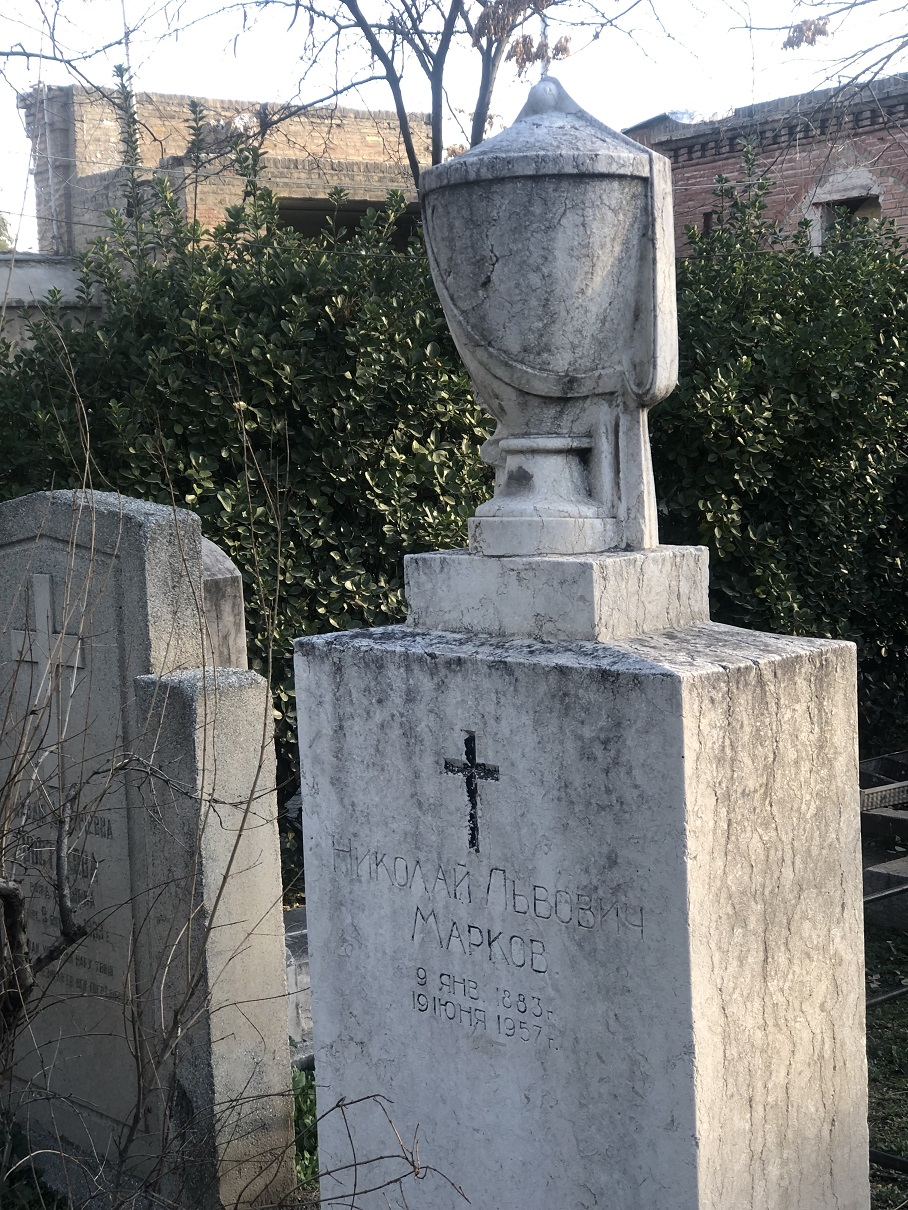
Grave of Markov at Doulab Cemetery

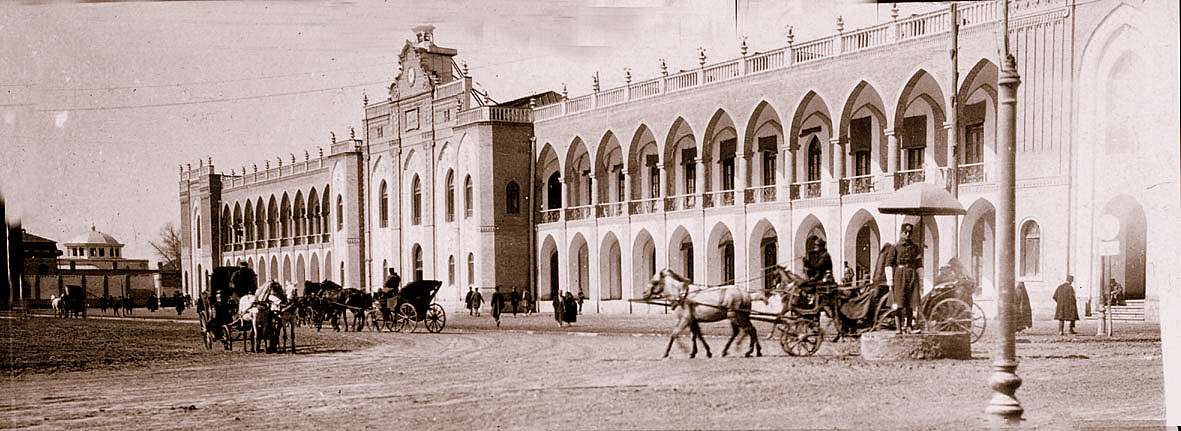
Tehran Municipality Palace

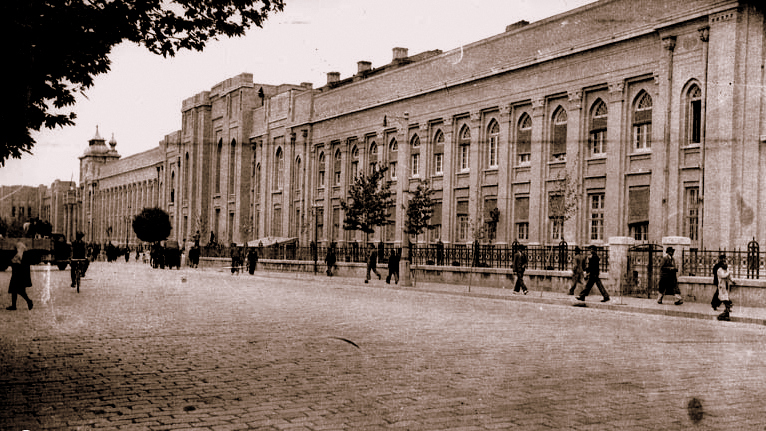
Post Museum (formerly Post Headquarters)

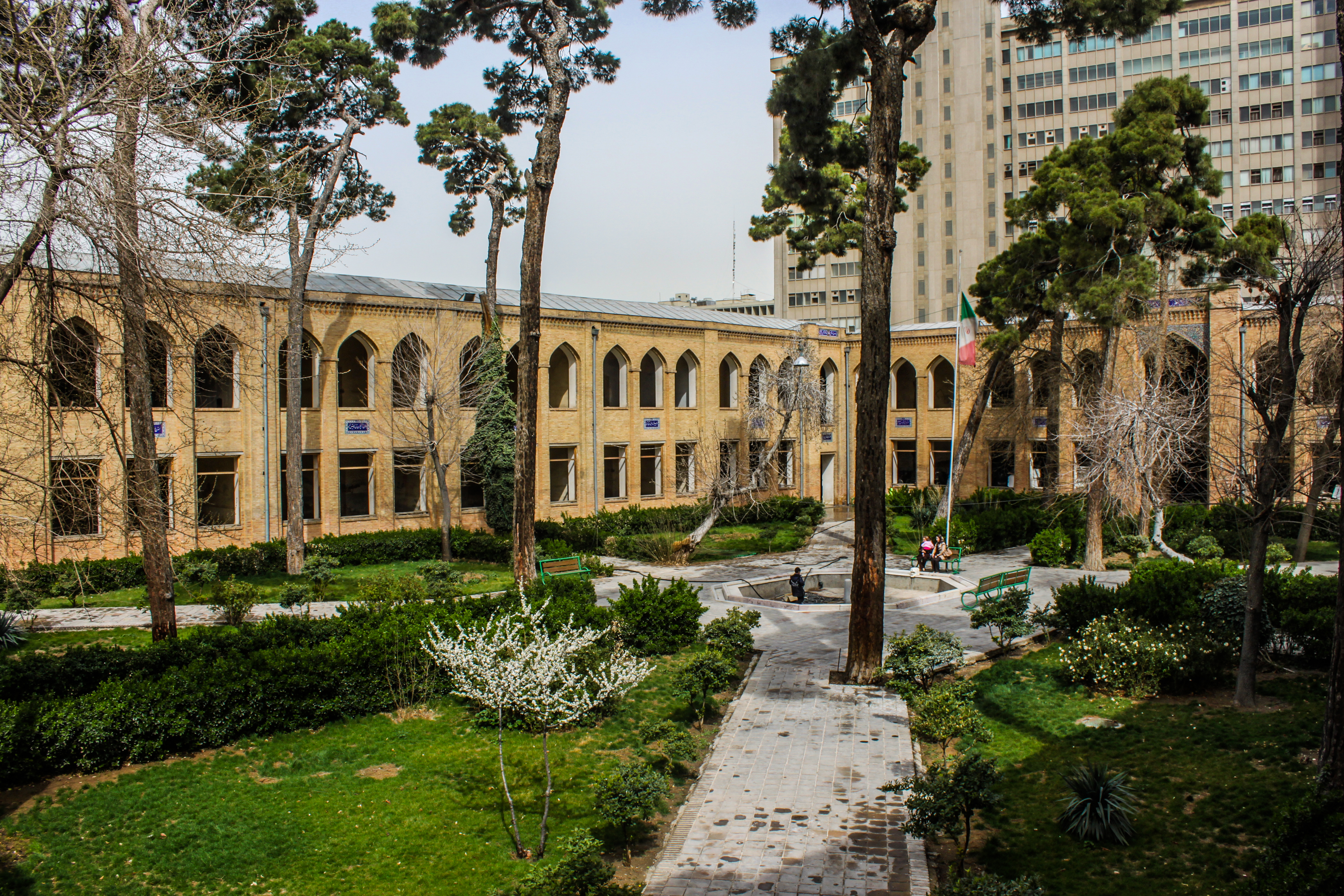
New Dar ul-Funun

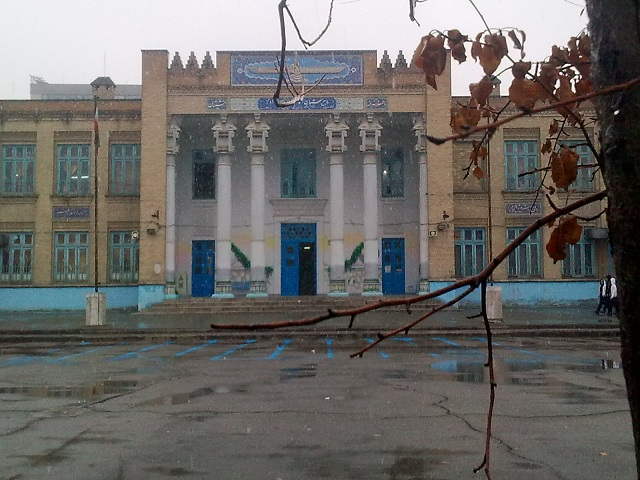
Anoushirvan High School

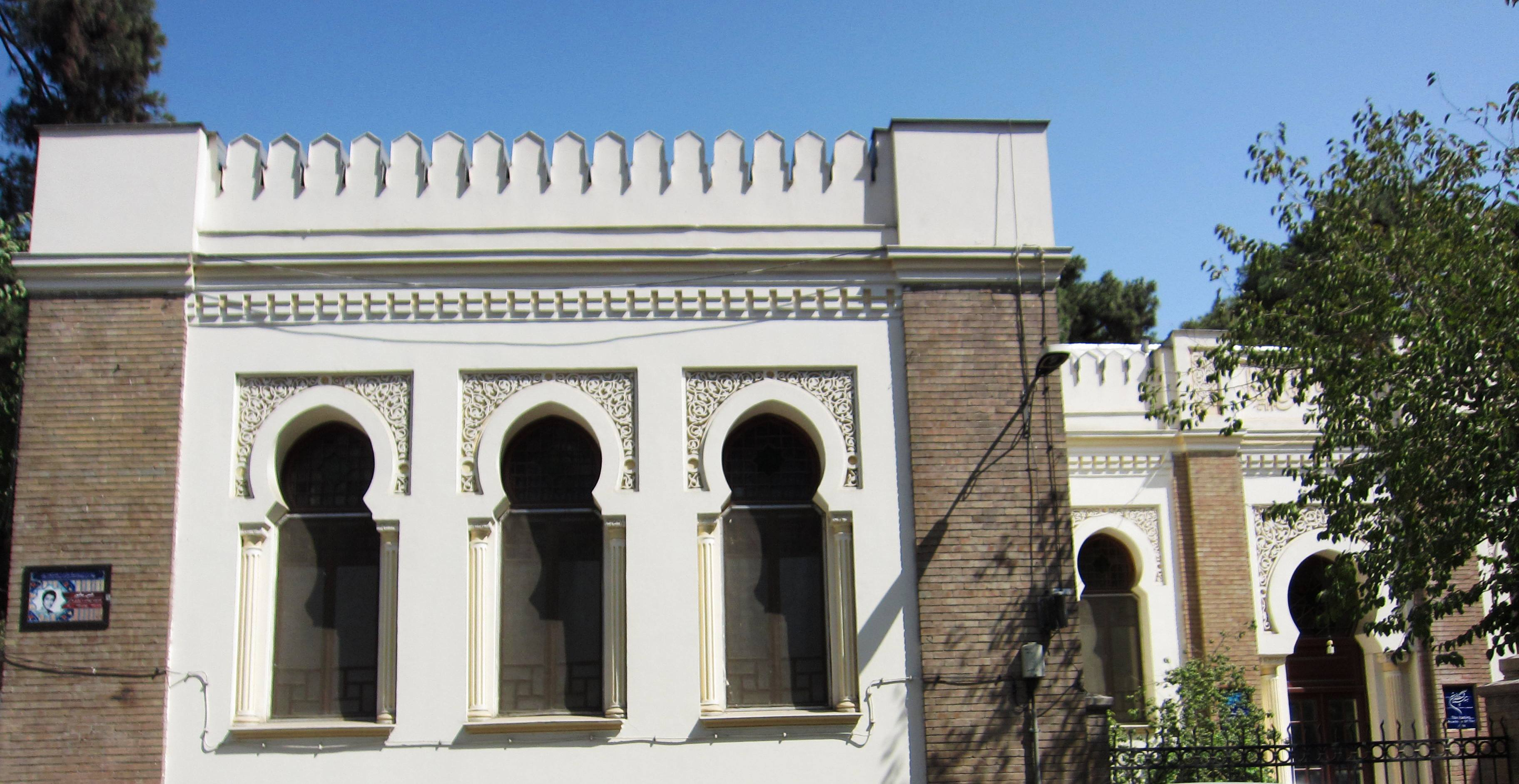
Adle House

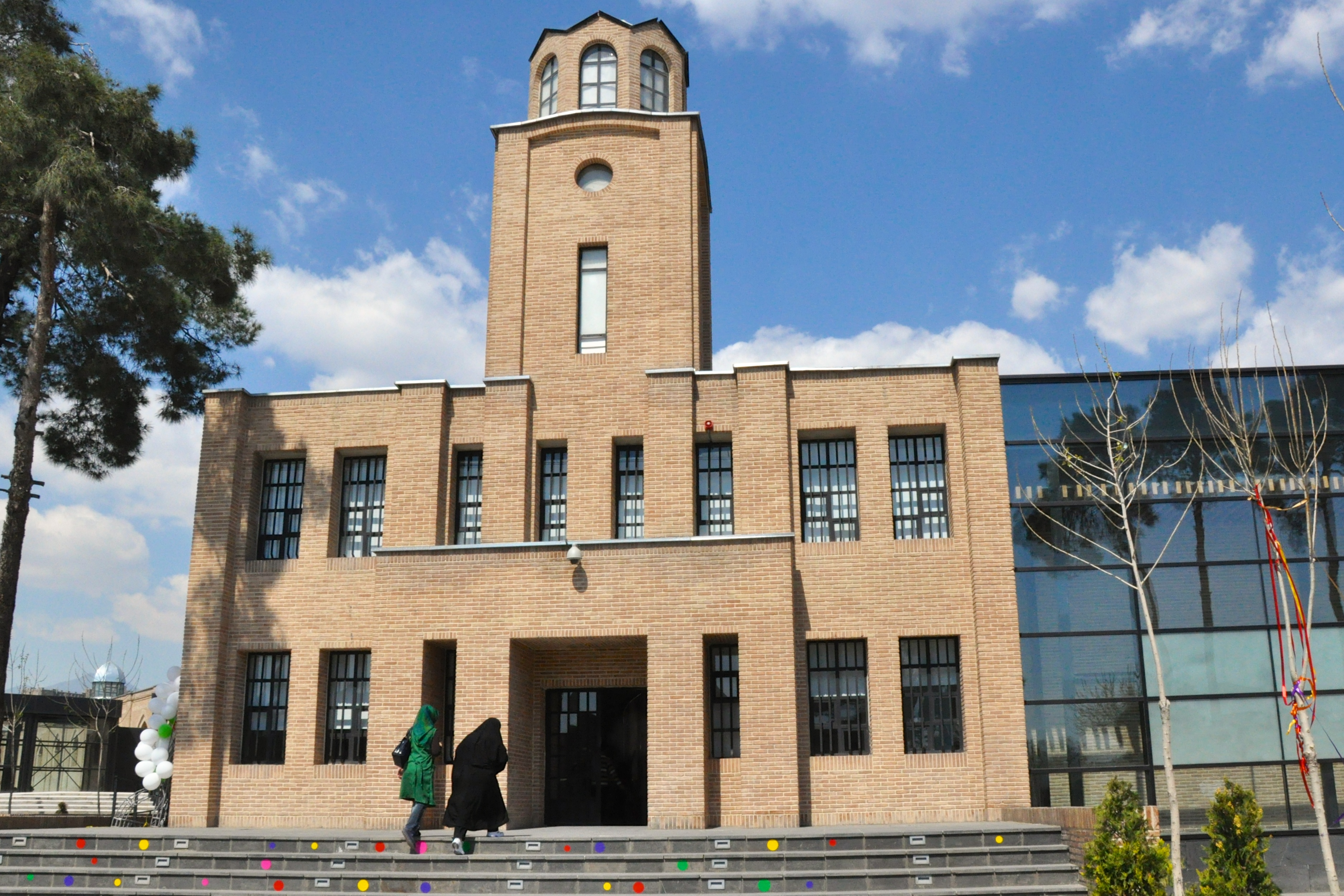
Qasr Prison

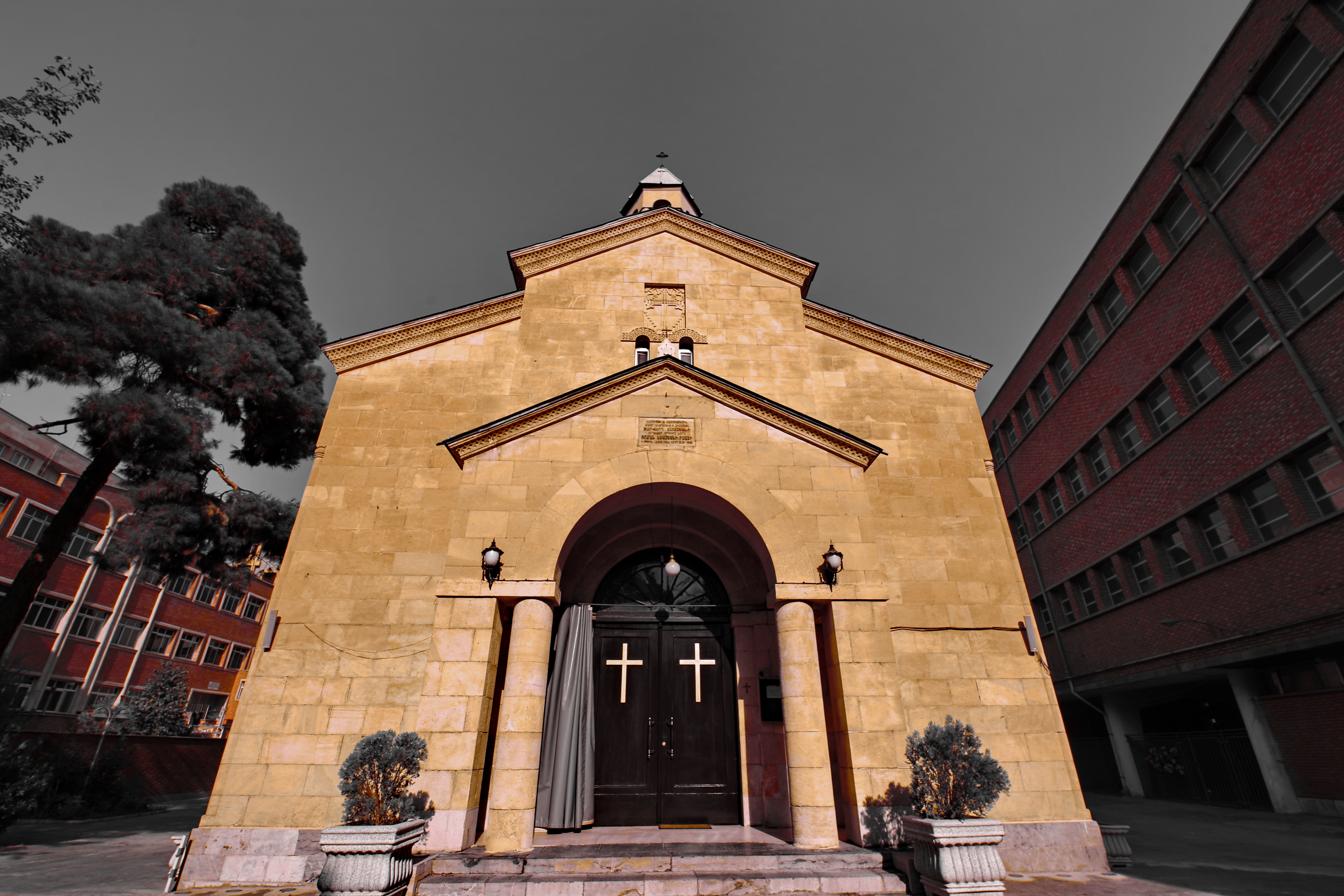
Holy Mother of God Church, Tehran

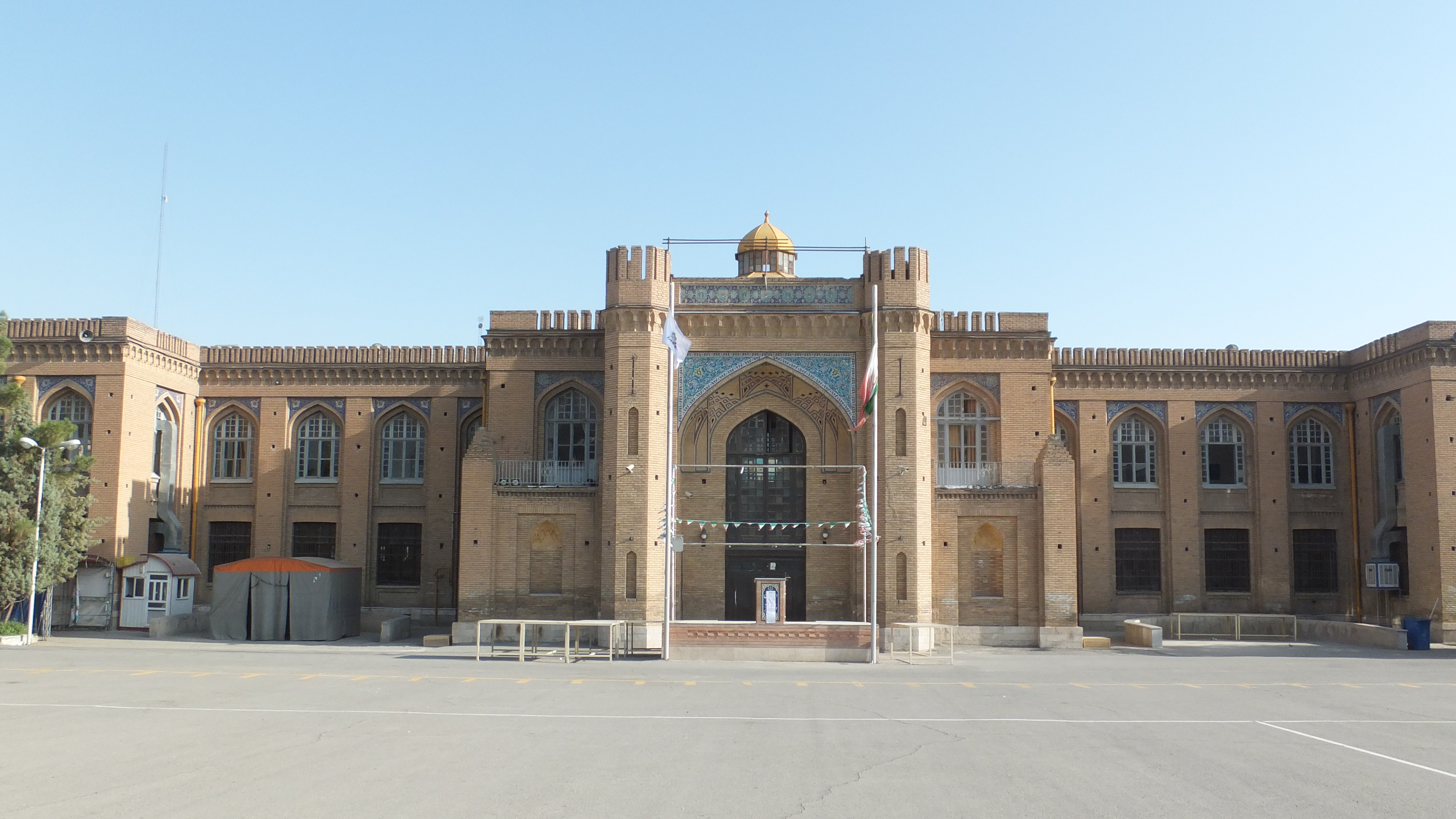
Alborz High School

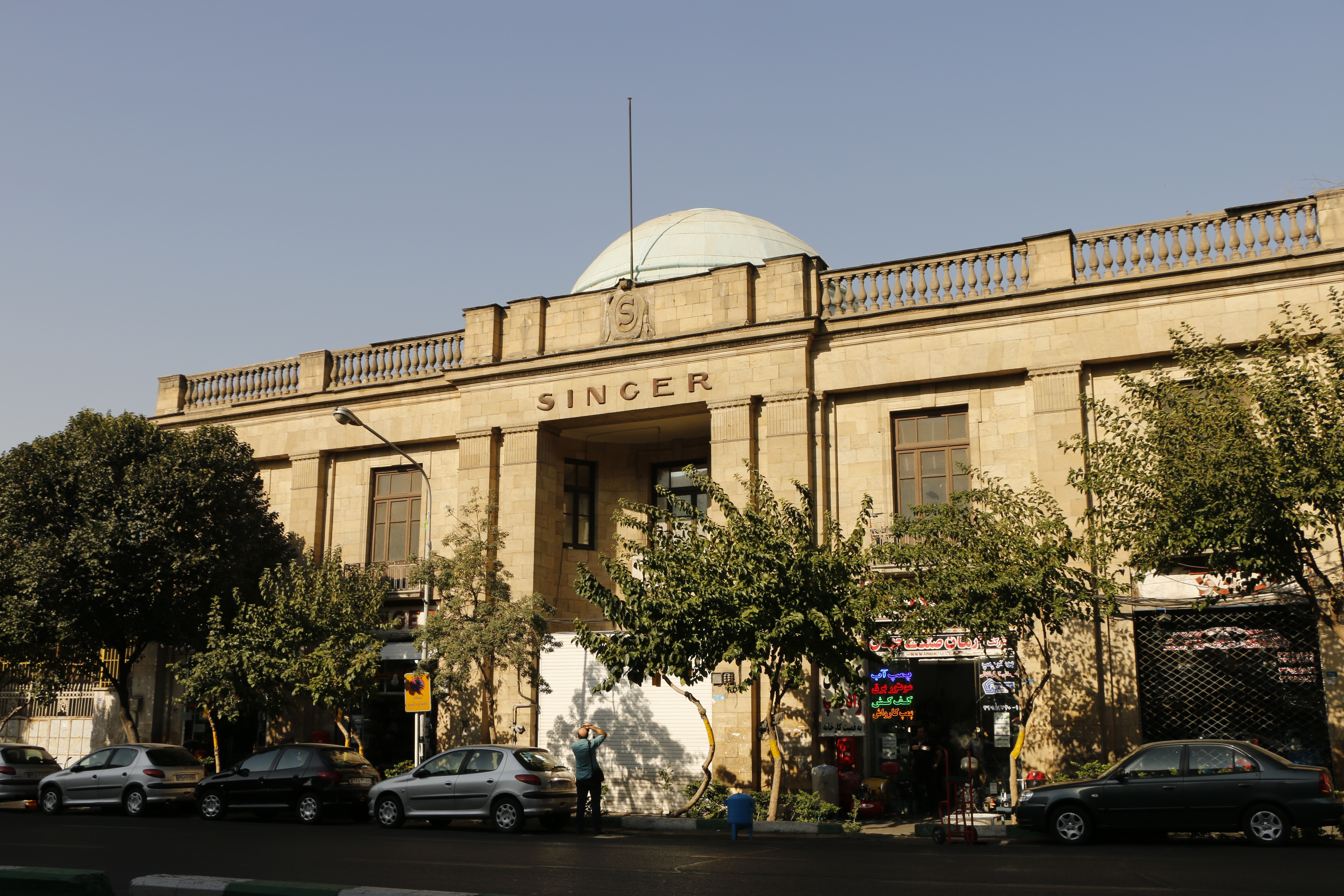
Singer Headquarters

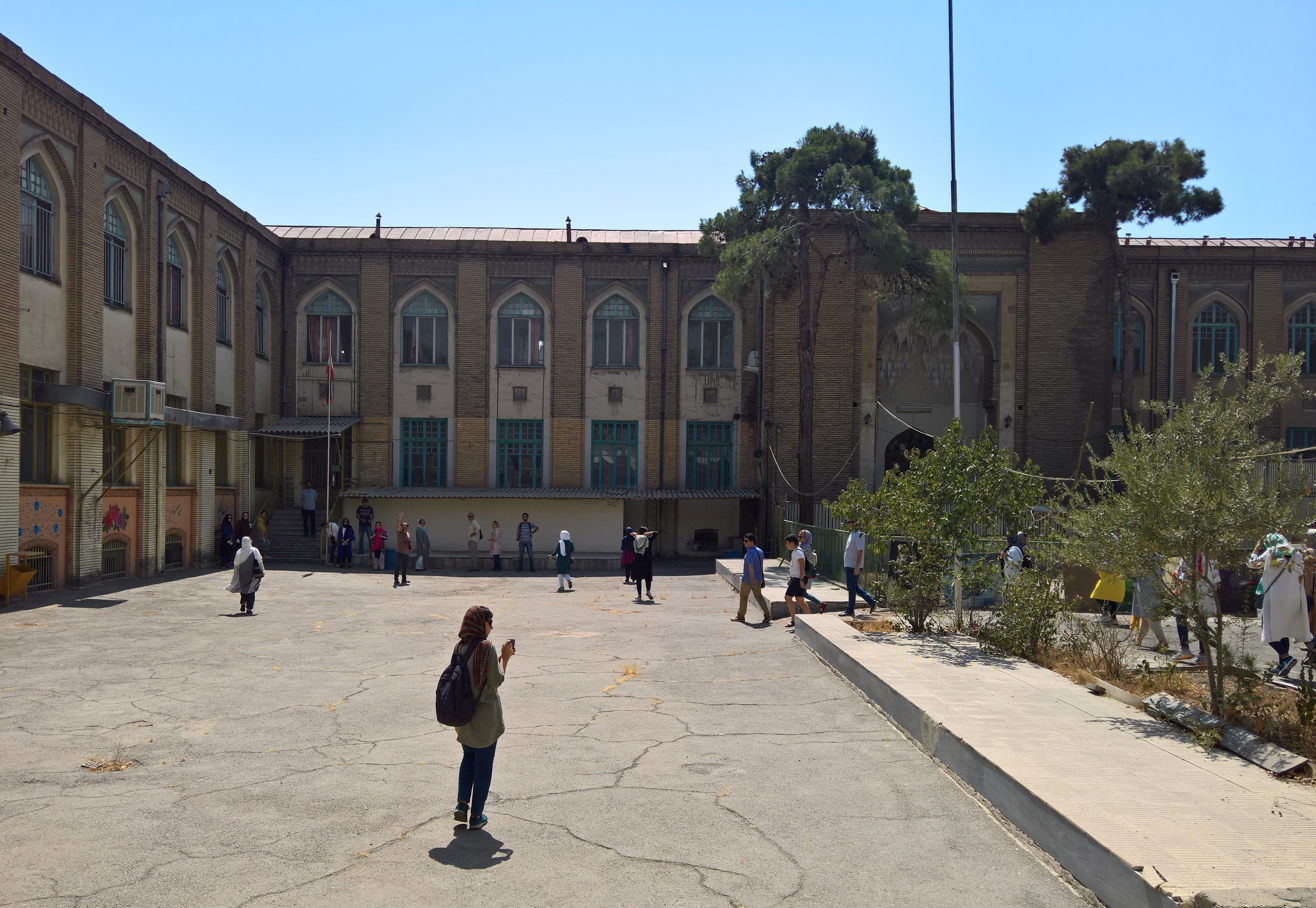
Jeanne d'Arc School

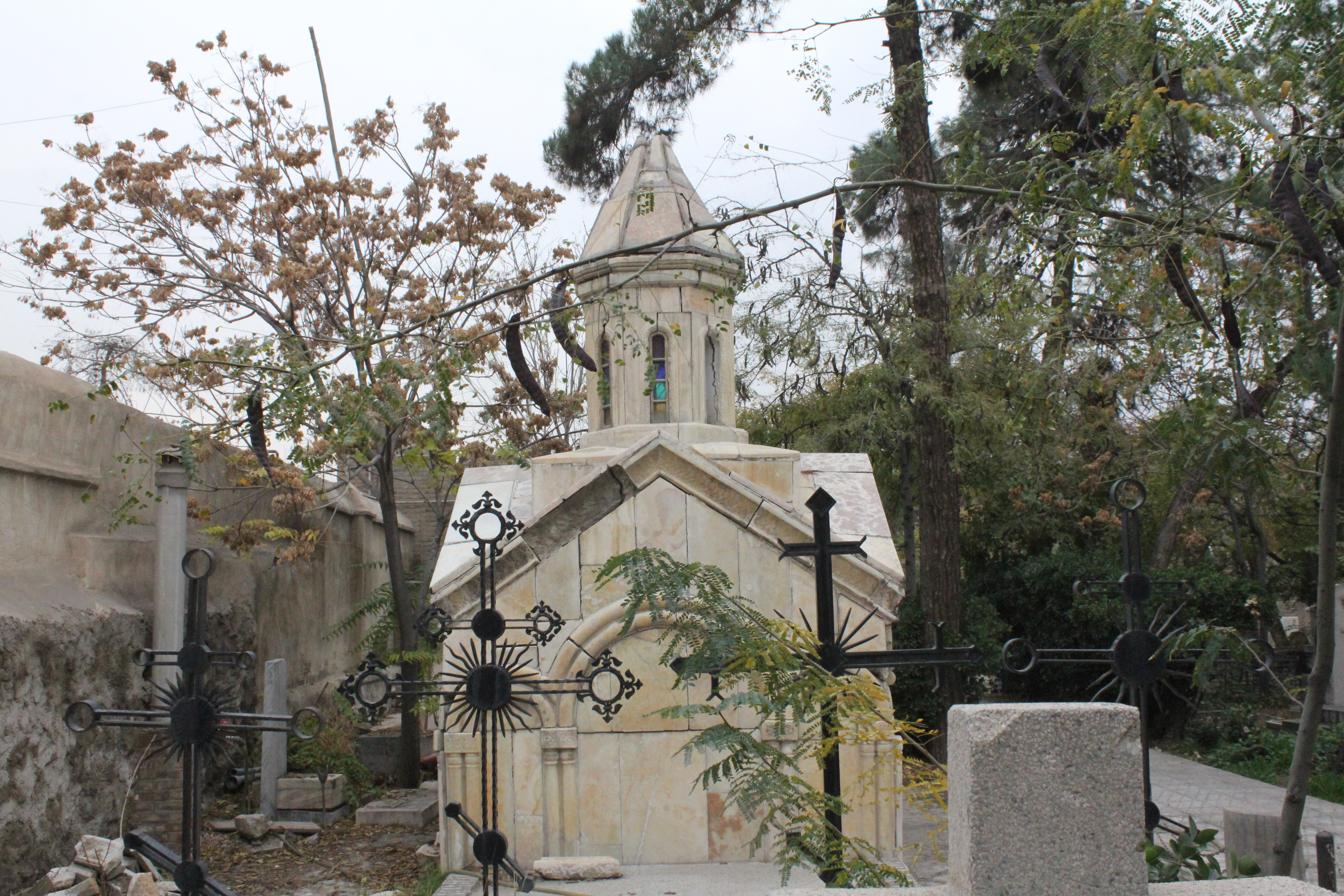
Georgian Prince Mausoleum

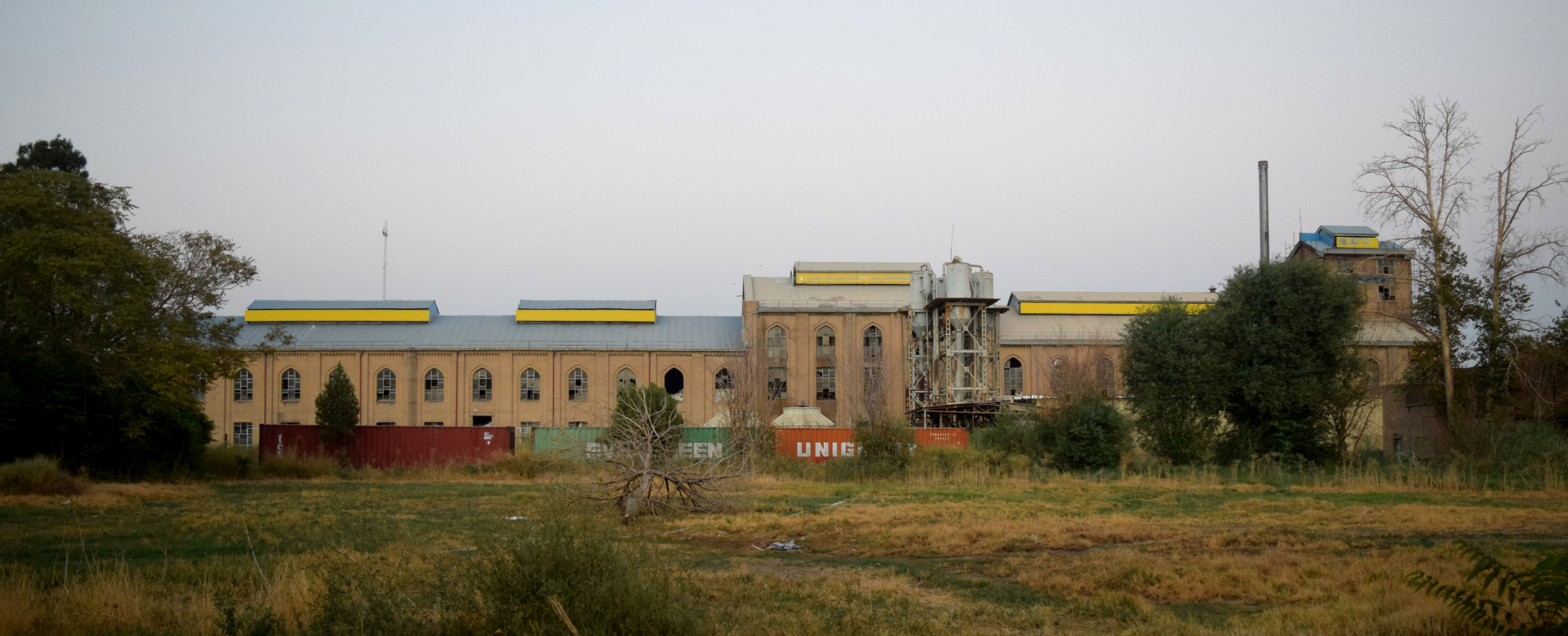
Varamin sugar refinery
