= Abi and Rabi =

1930 film

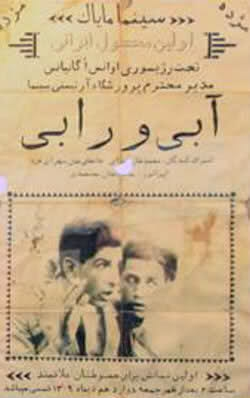
- Directed by: Ovanes Ohanian
- Written by: Ovanes Ohanian
- Produced by: Sako Elidze
- Starring: Ovanes Ohanian; Mohammad Khan Zarrabi; Gholamali Khan Sohrabi Fard; Mohammd Ali Ghotbi; Amir Arjmand
- Cinematography: Khan Baba Motazedi
- Distributed by: Cinema Mayak
- Release date: 1930
- Running time: 60 minutes
- Country: Iran
- Language: Silent

Abi and Rabi (Persian: آبی و رابی, romanized: Abi-o-Rabi) is a 1930 Iranian silent comedy film and also first silent feature film in the history of Iranian cinema directed by Ovanes Ohanian and starring Ovanes Ohanian, Mohammad Khan Zarrabi, Gholamali Khan Sohrabi Fard, Mohammd Ali Ghotbi and Amir Arjmand.

== Story ==
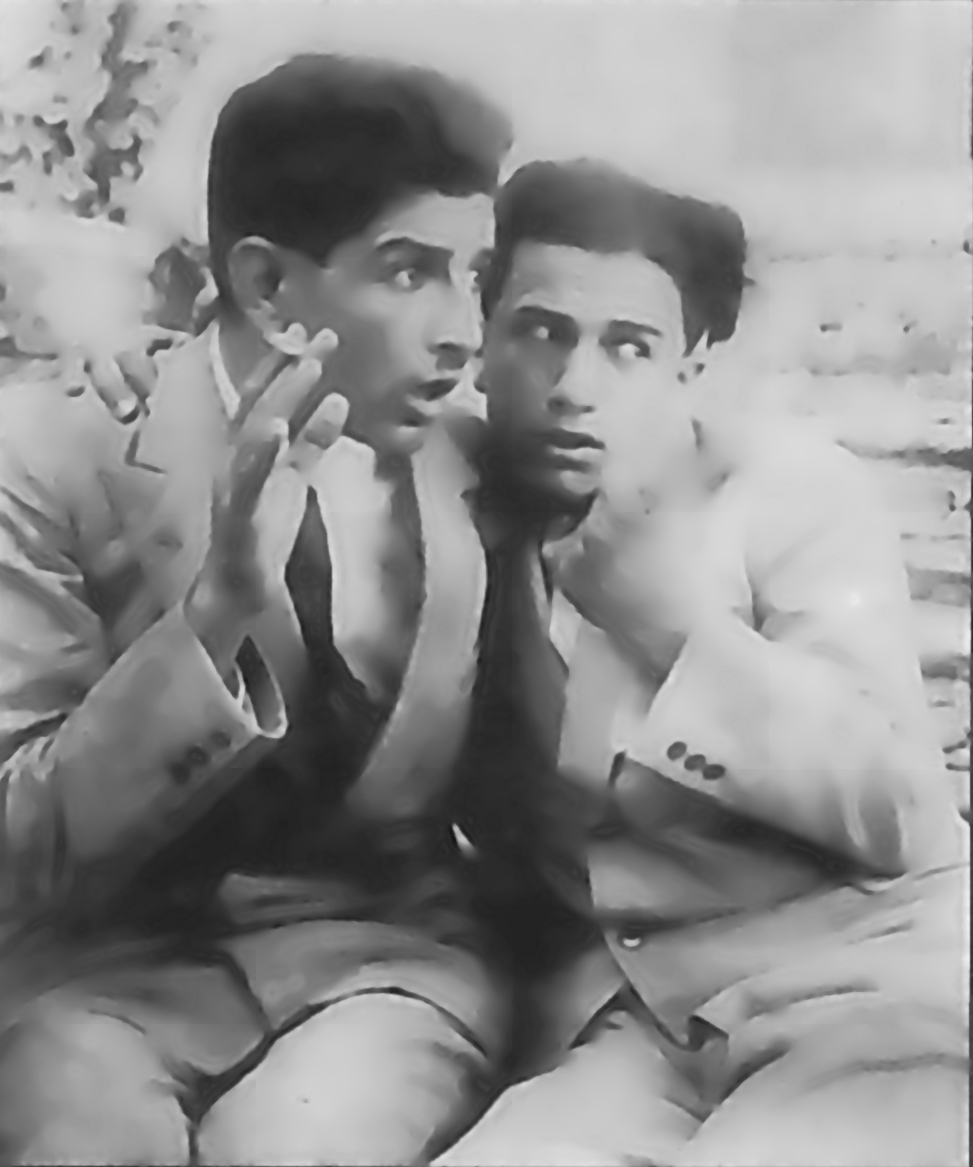
Gholam Ali Sahrabi and Mohamad Zerabi in Abi and Rabi, 1930 (screenshot and silent)

The film depicts the funny adventures of Abi (a tall man) and Rabi (a short man) in various situations. Abi drinks a lot of water through a plastic pipe, but Rabi's stomach grows big. Abi wants to sleep. He moves his head on the pillow because of the heat. The pillow gets torn, and the white feathers inside fly around all over the room. At this moment, Rabi enters the room. Thinking that it is snowing, Rabi opens his umbrella and holds it over his head. Rabi is squashed under a roller and he becomes tall. Abi hits him on the head with a sledge, and Rabi becomes a short and fat again. Abi and Rabi take a cab and head for Shahabdolazim. When they reach their destination, people are having their lunch and children are playing at a pool. One falls in the pool and the other's nose starts bleeding. A doctor appears to treat the injured one. Abi and Rabi order chicken in a restaurant. When the waiter brings the dish, the two start to eat with forks, but the chicken flies away.
