= List of Iranian films before 1960 =

A list of earliest films produced in Iran ordered by year of release before 1960. For an alphabetical list of Iranian films see Category:Iranian films

== 1930s ==
Title	Director	Cast	Genre	Notes
1930
Abi and Rabi	Ovanes Ohanian		Silent, Comedy	First Iranian silent movie
1931
Revenge on the Brother	Ebrahim Moradi		Silent, Drama	
1932
Lor Girl	Ardeshir Irani	Abdolhossein Sepanta, Roohangiz Sami-Nezhad		The first talkie film in Persian
1933
Haji Agha, the Cinema Actor	Ovanes Ohanian		Silent, Comedy	Second Iranian silent movie
1934
Ferdowsi	Abdolhossein Sepanta		Biography, Drama	
The Fickle	Ebrahim Moradi		Romance, Drama	
Shirin and Farhad	Abdolhossein Sepanta	Roohangiz Saminejad	Romance	
1935
1936
Black Eyes	Abdolhossein Sepanta	Fakhrozzaman Jabbar Vaziri	Romance	
1937
1938
Leyli va Majnun	Abdolhossein Sepanta	Abdolhossein Sepanta		
1939

== 1940s ==
Title	Director	Cast	Genre	Notes
1940
1941
1942
1943
1944
1945
1946
1947
1948
1949

== 1950s ==
Title	Director	Cast	Genre	Notes
1950
1951
1952
1953
1954
1955
1956
A Party in Hell	Samuel Khachikian, Mushegh Sarvarian			Entered into the 8th Berlin International Film Festival
1957
1958
Broken Spell	Siamak Yasemi			Entered into the 9th Berlin International Film Festival
1959
