= Culture of Iran =

The culture of Iran (Persian: فرهنگ ایران) or culture of Persia is one of the oldest and among the most influential in the world. Iran (Persia) is widely regarded as one of the cradles of civilization. Because of its dominant geopolitical position in the world, it has heavily influenced peoples and cultures situated in Southern and Eastern Europe to the west; Central Asia to the north; and South Asia, East Asia, and Southeast Asia to the east. Iranian history has significantly influenced the world through art, architecture, poetry, science and technology, medicine, philosophy, and engineering.

An "eclectic cultural elasticity" has been said to be one of the key defining characteristics of the Iranian identity and a clue to its historical longevity.

== History ==
The history of Iran's culture is marked by the influence of ancient civilizations such as the Elamites and Persians, as well as the Achaemenid and Sassanian empires.

The Arab conquest in the 7th century introduced Islamic traditions, which merged with pre-Islamic customs. This fusion resulted in a distinct cultural identity characterized by significant contributions to literature, art, and philosophy. Iran has historically served as a center of culture and learning, impacting the surrounding region. The South Caucasus and Central Asia "occupy an important place in the historical geography of Persian civilization." Much of the region was included in the pre-Islamic Persian empires, and many of its ancient peoples either belonged to the Iranian branch of the Indo-European peoples (e.g. Medes and Soghdians), or were in close cultural contact with them (e.g. the Armenians). In the words of Iranologist Richard Nelson Frye:

Many times I have emphasized that the present peoples of central Asia, whether Iranian or Turkic speaking, have one culture, one religion, one set of social values and traditions with only language separating them.

The culture of Persia has thus developed over several thousand years. But historically, the peoples of what are now Iran, Kurdistan Region, Armenia, Azerbaijan, Turkey, Uzbekistan, Tajikistan, Turkmenistan, Eastern Georgia, and Afghanistan are related to one another as part of the larger group of peoples of the Greater Iranian cultural and historical sphere. The Northern Caucasus is well within the sphere of influence of Persian culture as well, as can be seen from the many remaining relics, ruins, and works of literature from that region.

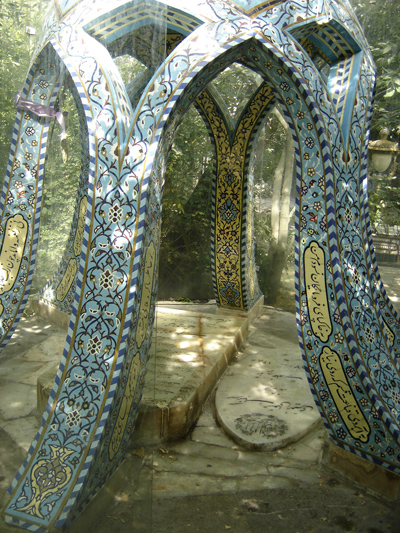
Iran is filled with tombs of poets and musicians, such as this one belonging to Rahi Mo'ayeri. An illustration of Iran's deep artistic heritage.

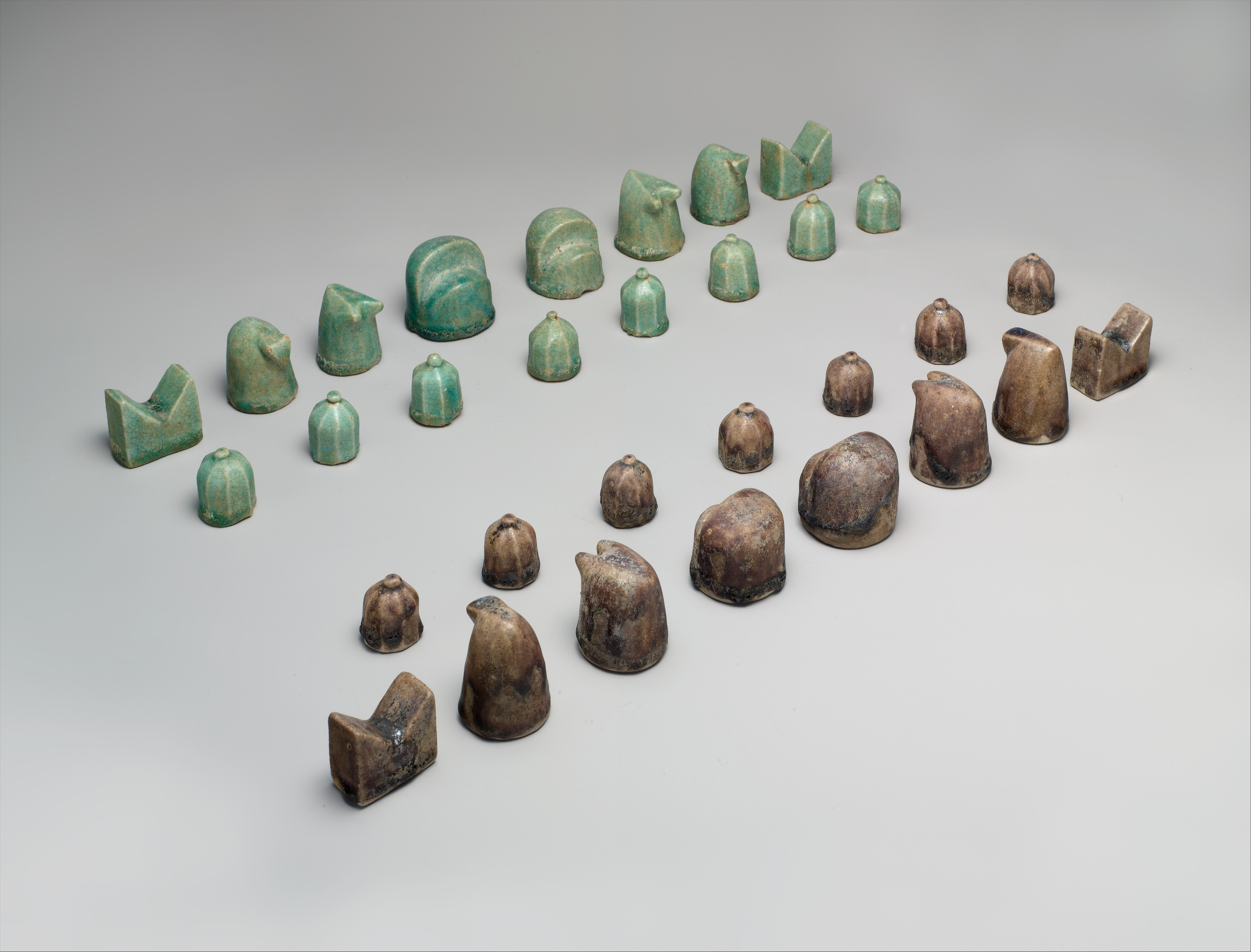
Iranian chess (shatranj) set, glazed fritware, 12th century Nishapur. New York Metropolitan Museum of Art.

Craftsmanship in Iranian Architecture. An excellent animation depicting the intricate details of the traditional interior design: (click).

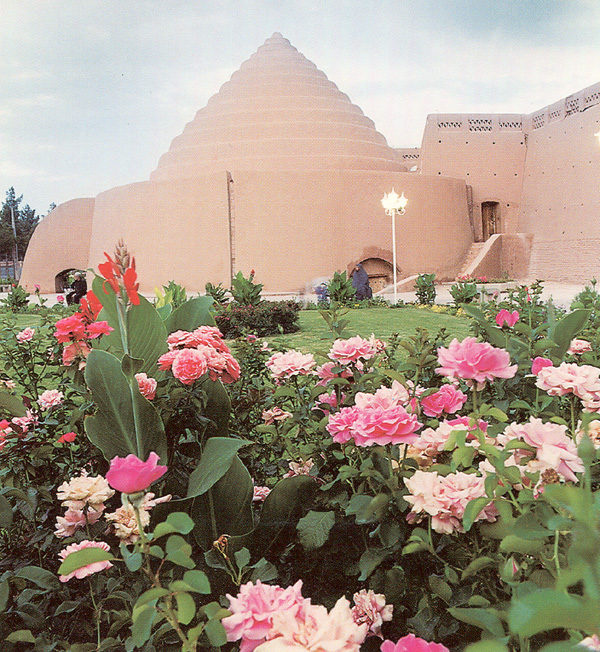
An ancient ice house, called a yakhchal, built in ancient times for storing ice during summers

== Art ==
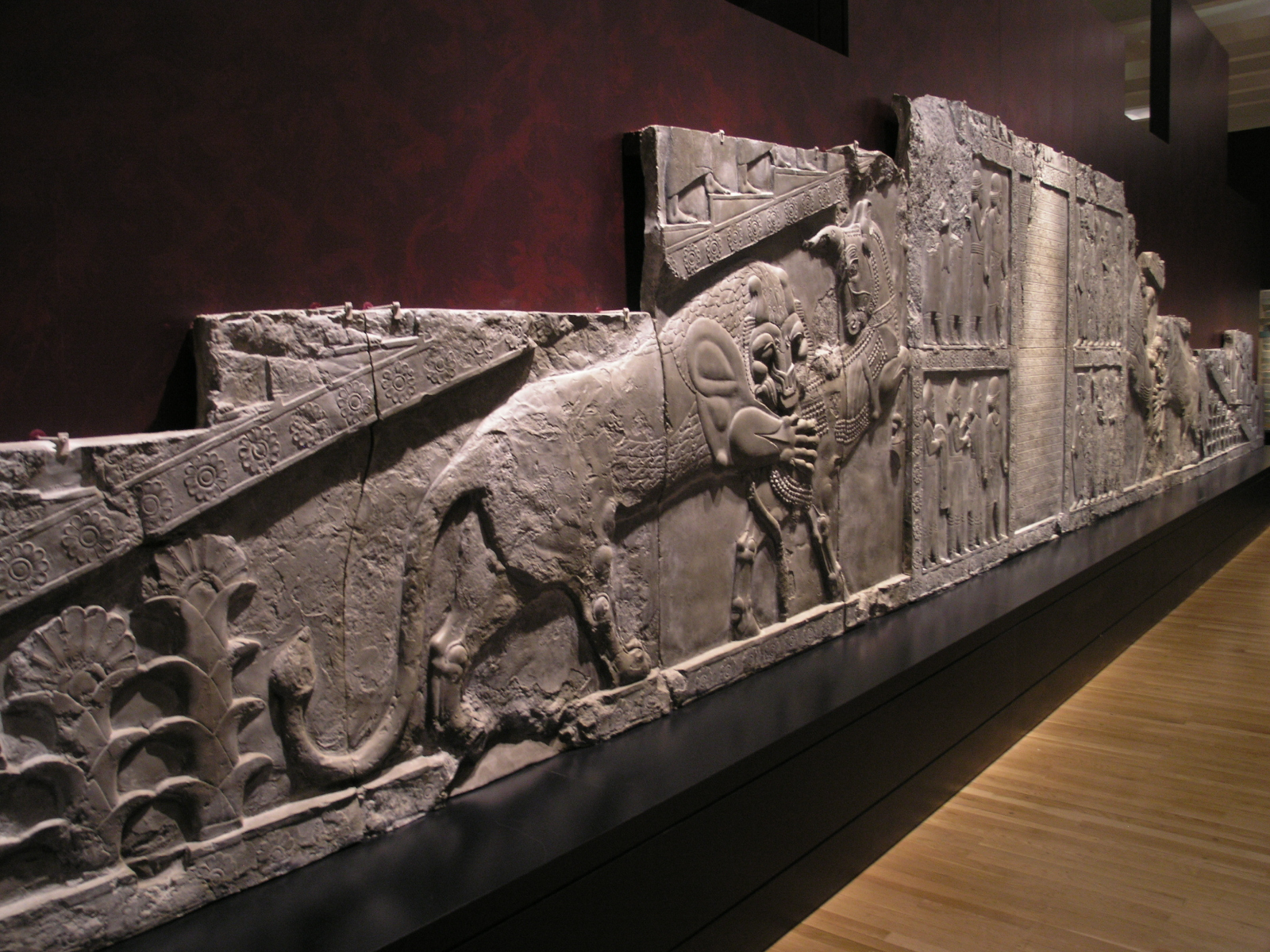
Intricate stone art of Persepolis

Iran has one of the oldest, richest, and most influential art heritages in the world, which encompasses many disciplines including literature, music, dance, architecture, painting, weaving, pottery, calligraphy, metalworking, embroidery, and stonemasonry. Iranian art has gone through numerous phases, which is evident from the unique aesthetics of Iran. From the Elamite Chogha Zanbil to the Median and Achaemenid reliefs of Persepolis to the mosaics of Bishapur.

The Islamic Golden Age brought changes to the styles and practice of the arts. However, each Iranian dynasty had its own particular foci, building upon the previous dynasty's, all of which during their times were heavily influential in shaping the cultures of the world then and today.

=== Contemporary art ===
There is a resurgence of interest in Iranian contemporary artists and in artists from the larger Iranian diaspora. Key notables include Shirin Aliabadi, Mohammed Ehsai, Ramin Haerizadeh, Rokni Haerizadeh, Golnaz Fathi, Monir Shahroudy Farmanfarmaian, Parastou Forouhar, Pouran Jinchi, Farhad Moshiri, Shirin Neshat, Parviz Tanavoli, Y. Z. Kami, and Charles Hossein Zenderoudi.

=== Language ===
Several languages are spoken throughout Iran, including languages from the Iranian, Turkic, and Semitic language families. According to the CIA World Factbook, 78% of Iranians speak an Iranian language as their native tongue, 18% speak a Turkic language as their native tongue, and 2% speak a Semitic language as their native tongue, while the remaining 2% speak languages from various other groups. Although the Azerbaijanis speak a Turkic language, their culture, history, and genetics are often associated with the Iranian people.

The predominant language and national language of Iran is Persian, which is spoken fluently across the country. Azerbaijani is spoken primarily and widely in the northwest, Kurdish and Luri are spoken primarily in the west, Mazandarani and Gilaki are spoken in the regions along the Caspian Sea, Arabic primarily in the Persian Gulf coastal regions, Balochi primarily in the southeast, and Turkmen primarily in northern border regions. Smaller languages spread in other regions notably include Talysh, Georgian, Armenian, Assyrian, and Circassian. According to recent scientific papers, the following languages have the highest number of speakers in Iran: Persian, 63.3%; Azeri Turkic (and its dialects), 13%; Kurdish, 7%; Gilaki, 3.6%; Mazandarani (or Tabari), 3%; Arabic, 1.8%; other languages (including Lorish and Balochi), 8.3%.

=== Literature ===
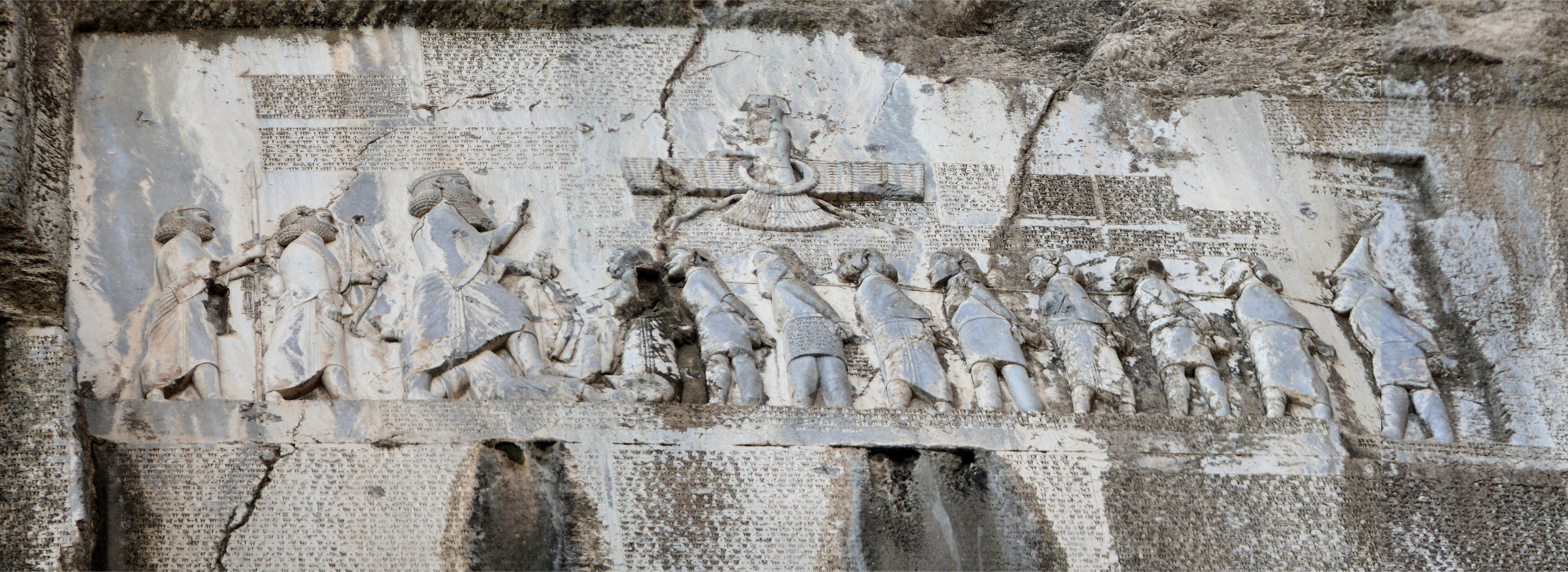
Behistun inscription reliefs

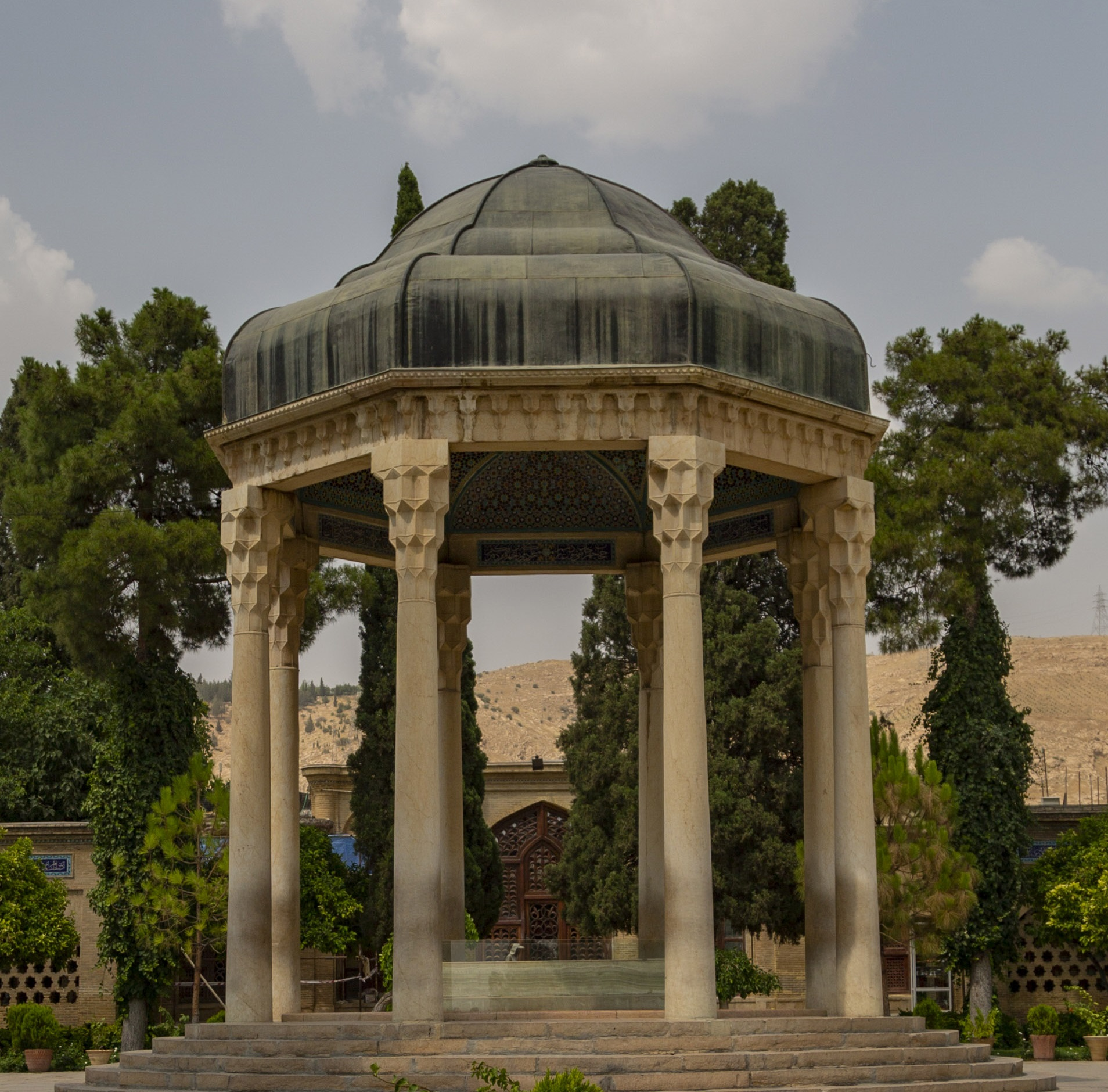
Tomb of Hafez in Shiraz, Iran

The literature of Iran is one of the world's oldest and most celebrated, spanning over 2,500 years from the many Achaemenid inscriptions, such as the Behistun inscription, to the celebrated Iranian poets of the Islamic Golden Age and modern Iran. Iranian literature has been described as one of the great literature of humanity and one of the four main pillars of world literature. L.P. Elwell-Sutton describes the literature of the Persian language as "one of the richest poetic literature of the world".

Very few literary works of pre-Islamic Iran have survived following the destruction of the libraries of Persepolis by Alexander the Great and the subsequent invasion of Iran by the Arabs in 641, who sought to eradicate all non-Quranic texts. This resulted in all Iranian libraries being destroyed and books either being burnt or thrown into rivers. The only way that Iranians could protect these books was to bury them, but many of the texts were forgotten over time. As soon as circumstances permitted, the Iranians wrote books and assembled libraries.

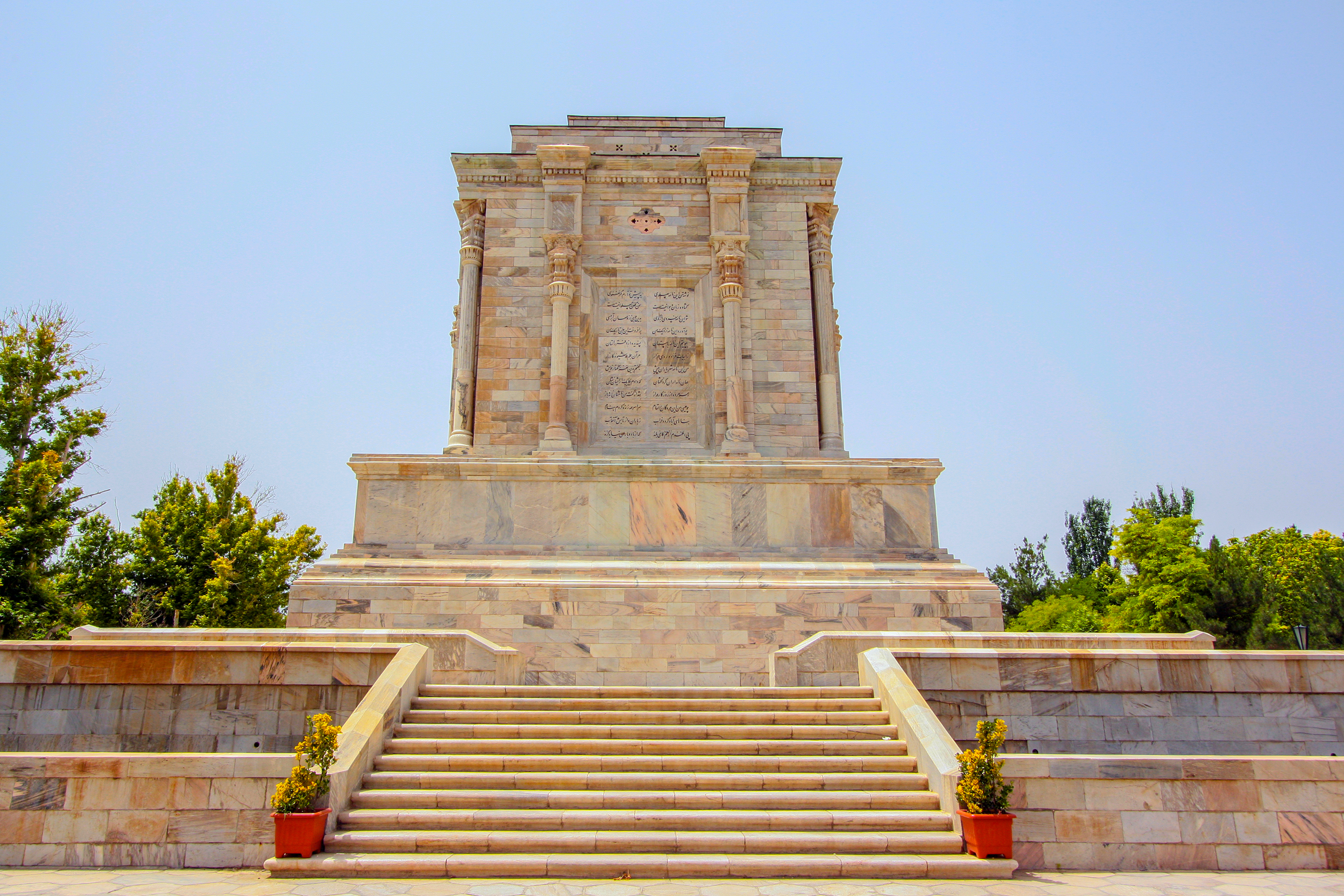
The Tomb of Ferdowsi in Tus, Iran

Iranian literature encompasses a variety of literature in the languages used in Iran. Modern Iranian literature includes Persian literature, Azerbaijani literature, Kurdish literature, and the literature of the remaining minority languages. The Persian language has been often dubbed as the most worthy language of the world to serve as a conduit for poetry. Azerbaijani literature was developed highly after Iran's first reunification in 800 years under the Safavid Empire, whose rulers themselves wrote poetry. There remain a few literary works of the extinct Iranian language of Old Azeri that was used in Azerbaijan prior to the linguistic Turkification of the people of the region. Kurdish literature has incorporated the various Kurdish dialects that are spoken throughout the Middle East. The earliest works of Kurdish literature are those of the 16th-century poet Malaye Jaziri.

Some notable poets include Ferdowsi, Saadi, Hafiz, Attar, Nezami, Jami, Rumi, Omar Khayyam, Taleb Amoli, Ubayd Zakani, Shams Tabrizi, Rudaki and Vahshi Bafqi. These poets have inspired Goethe, Ralph Waldo Emerson, and many others. Contemporary literature has been influenced by classical Persian poetry, but also reflects the particularities of modern-day Iran, through writers such as Houshang Moradi-Kermani, the most translated modern Iranian author, and poet Ahmad Shamlou.

=== Music ===
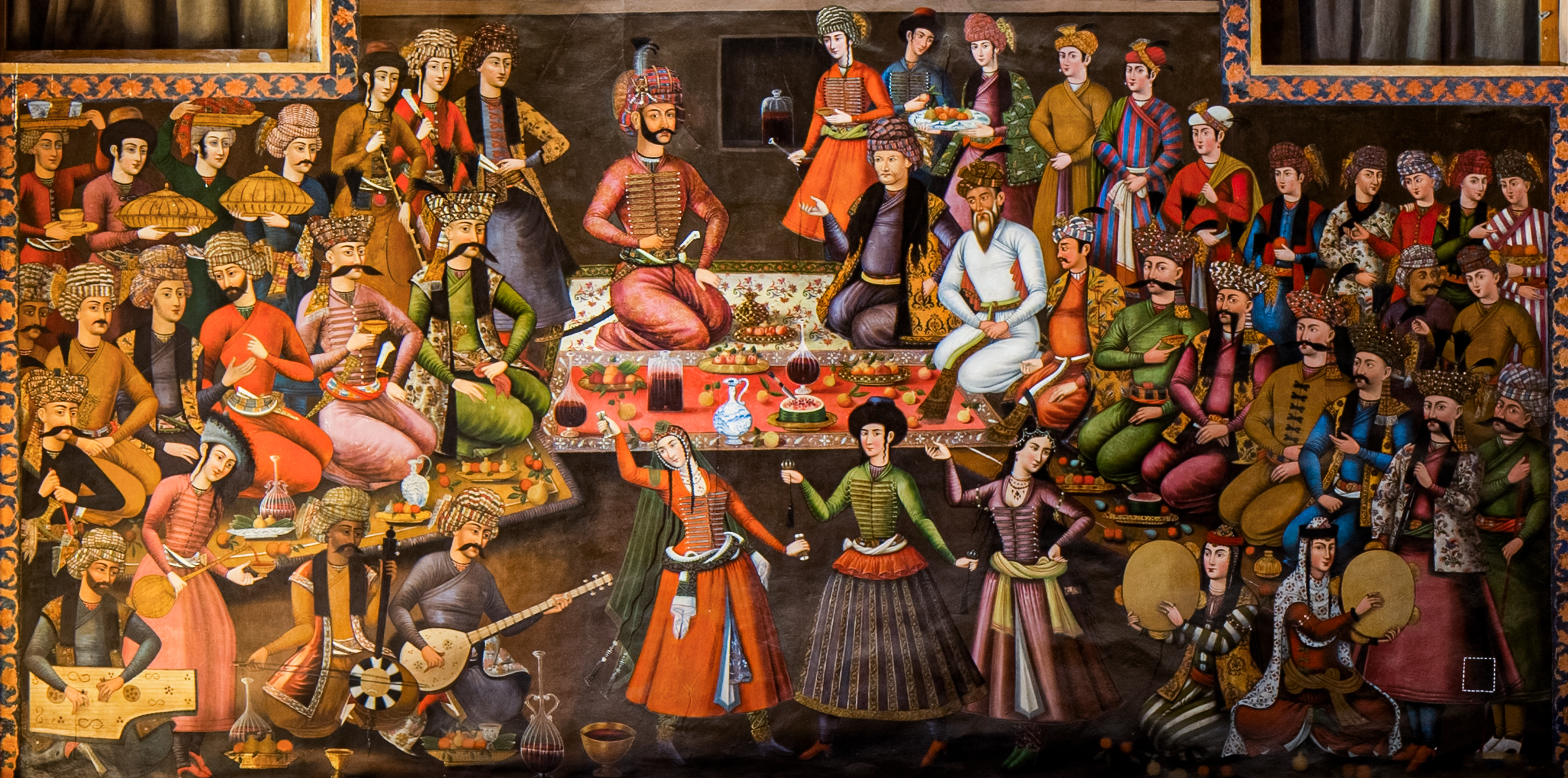
Music, dance, poetry and wine-drinking at the court of 17th century ruler Shah Abbas II

Iranian music has directly influenced the cultures of West Asia, Central Asia, Europe, and South Asia. It has mainly influenced and built up much of the musical terminology of the neighboring Turkic and Arabic cultures and reached India through the 16th-century Persianate Mughal Empire, whose court promoted new musical forms by bringing Iranian musicians.

Iran is the place of origin of complex instruments, with the instruments dating back to the 3rd millennium BC. Several trumpets made of silver, gold, and copper were found in eastern Iran that are attributed to the Oxus civilization and date back between 2200 and 1750 BC. The use of both vertical and horizontal angular harps have been documented at the archaeological sites of Madaktu (650 BC) and Kul-e Fara (900–600 BC), with the largest collection of Elamite instruments documented at Kul-e Fara. Multiple depictions of horizontal harps were also sculpted in Assyrian palaces, dating back between 865 and 650 BC.

The reign of Sassanian ruler Khosrow II is regarded as a "golden age" for Iranian music. Sassanid music is where many the many music cultures of the world trace their distant origins. The court of Khosrow II hosted several prominent musicians, including Azad, Bamshad, Barbad, Nagisa, Ramtin, and Sarkash. Among these attested names, Barbad is remembered in many documents and has been named as remarkably highly skilled. He was a poet-musician who developed modal music and may have invented the lute and the musical tradition that was to transform into the forms of dastgah and maqam. He has been credited to have organized a musical system consisting of seven "royal modes" (xosrovāni), 30 derived modes (navā), and 360 melodies (dāstān).

The academic classical music of Iran, in addition to preserving melody types that are often attributed to Sassanian musicians, is based on the theories of sonic aesthetics as expounded by the likes of Iranian musical theorists in the early centuries after the Muslim conquest of the Sasanian Empire, most notably Avicenna, Farabi, Qotb-ed-Din Shirazi, and Safi-ed-Din Urmawi.

=== Dance ===
Iran has a rich and ancient dance culture that extends from the 6th millennium BC. Dances from ancient artifacts, excavated at the archaeological pre-historic sites of Iran, portray a vibrant culture that mixes different forms of dances for all occasions. In conjunction with music, the artifacts depicted actors, dancers, and ordinary people dancing in plays, dramas, celebrations, mourning, and religious rituals with equipment such as costumes of animals or plants, masks, and surrounding objects. As time progressed, this culture of dance began to develop and flourish.

Although the cultures of its ethnic groups are very similar and in most areas nearly identical, each has its own distinct and specific dance style. Iran possesses four categories of dance with these being: group dances, solo improvisational dances, war or combat dances, and spiritual dances. Typically, the group dances are often unique and named after the region or the ethnic groups with which they are associated. These dances can be chain dances involving a group or the more common group dances mainly performed at festive occasions like weddings and Noruz celebrations which focus less on communal line or circle dances and more on solo improvisational forms, with each dancer interpreting the music in their special way but within a specific range of dance vocabulary sometimes blending other dance styles or elements. Solo dances are usually reconstructions of the historical and court dances of the various Iranian dynasties throughout history, with the most common types being that of the Safavid and Qajar dynasties due to them being relatively newer. These often are improvisational dances and utilize delicate, graceful movements of the hands and arms, such as wrist circles.

War or combat dances imitate combat or serve as training for warriors. For instance, the ritualized wrestling movements of the Zurkhaneh ("House of Strength") are considered a form of dance called "Raghs-e-Pa" or "Pay-Bazi." These movements also resemble martial arts and are part of the cultural heritage of warrior training. Spiritual dances are known as "sama". These dances serve spiritual purposes, such as removing ill omens or exorcising evil spirits. These dances involve trance, music, and complex movements. One example is the Balochi dance "le'b gowati", performed to rid a possessed person of the offending spirit. In the Balochi language, the term "gowati" refers to psychologically ill patients who have recovered through music and dance.

The earliest researched dance from Iran is a dance worshiping Mithra, the Zoroastrian angelic divinity of covenant, light, and oath, which was used commonly by the Roman cult of Mithra. One of the cult's ceremonies involved the sacrifice of a bull followed by a dance that promoted vigor in life.

=== Architecture ===
Iranian architecture dates back to at least 5000 BC with characteristic examples distributed over a vast area from Turkey and Iraq to Uzbekistan and Tajikistan to the South Caucasus and Zanzibar. Currently, there are 19 UNESCO-designated World Heritage Sites that were designed and constructed by Iranians, with 11 of them being located outside of Iran. Iranian architecture displays a great variety of both structure and aesthetics and despite the repeated trauma of destructive invasions and cultural shocks, the Iranian zeal and identity has always triumphed and flourished. In turn, it has greatly influenced the architecture of its invaders from the Greeks to the Arabs to the Turks.

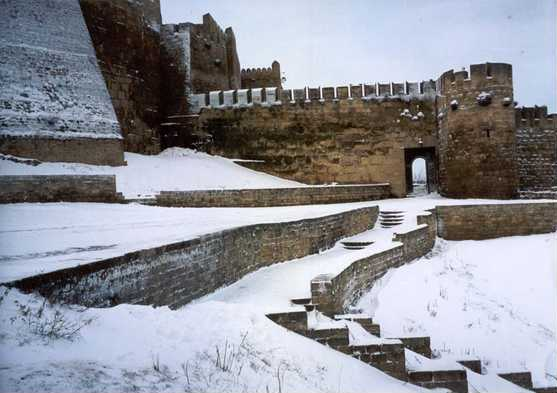
Sassanian fortress in Derbent, Dagestan. Inscribed on Russia's UNESCO world heritage list since 2003.

The traditional theme of Iranian architecture is cosmic symbolism, which depicts the communication and participation of man with the powers of heaven. This theme has given continuity and longevity to the architecture and has been a primary source of the emotional character of the nation. Architecture ranges from simple structures to "some of the most majestic structures the world has ever seen". Architectural style is the combination of intensity and simplicity to form immediacy, while ornament and, often, subtle proportions reward sustained observation. Iranian architecture makes use of abundant symbolic geometry, using pure forms such as the circle and square, and plans are based on often symmetrical layouts featuring rectangular courtyards and halls. The paramount virtues of Iranian architecture are: "a marked feeling for form and scale; structural inventiveness, especially in vault and dome construction; a genius for decoration with a freedom and success not rivaled in any other architecture".

The traditional architecture is categorized into two families and six following classes or styles. The two categories are Zoroastrian and Islamic, which reference the eras of pre-Islamic and post-Islamic Iran, and the six styles, in order of their era, are Parsian, Parthian Khorasani, Razi, Azari, Esfahani. The pre-Islamic styles draw on 3,000 to 4,000 years of architectural development from the various civilizations of the Iranian plateau. The post-Islamic architecture draws ideas from its pre-Islamic predecessor and has geometrical and repetitive forms, as well as surfaces that are richly decorated with glazed tiles, carved stucco, patterned brickwork, floral motifs, and calligraphy.

In addition to historic gates, palaces, bridges, buildings, and religious sites that highlight the highly developed supremacy of the Iranian art of architecture, gardens are also an example of cosmic symbolism and unique style of combining intensity and simplicity for form immediacy. There are currently 14 Iranian gardens that are listed as UNESCO World Heritage Sites, with 5 of them being located outside of Iran. The traditional style of Iranian gardens is to represent an earthly paradise or a heaven on Earth. From the time of the Achaemenid Empire, the idea of an earthly paradise spread through Iranian literature to other cultures, with the word for paradise in the Iranian languages of Avestan, Old Persian, and Median, spreading to languages across the world. The style and design of the Iranian garden greatly influenced the garden styles of countries from Spain to Italy and Greece to India, with some notable examples of such gardens being the gardens of the Alhambra in Spain, Humayun's Tomb, and the Taj Mahal in India, the Hellenistic gardens of the Seleucid Empire and the Ptolemies in Alexandria.

== Cuisine ==
Iranian cuisine refers to the culinary practices of Iran. Due to the historically common usage of the term "Persia" to refer to Iran in the Western world, it is alternatively known as Persian cuisine, despite Persians being only one of a multitude of Iranian ethnic groups who have contributed to Iran's culinary traditions. (Note: This issue is still debated today.) Iran has a rich variety of traditional dishes, and has influenced many other cuisines over the ages, among them the cuisine from the Caucasus, Central Asian cuisine, Greek cuisine, Levantine cuisine, Mesopotamian cuisine, Russian cuisine and Turkish cuisine. Aspects of Iranian cuisine have also been significantly adopted by Indian cuisine and Pakistani cuisine through various historical Persianate sultanates that flourished during Muslim rule on the Indian subcontinent, with the most notable and influential of these polities being the Mughal Empire.

Typical Iranian main dishes are combinations of rice with meat, vegetables and nuts. Herbs are frequently used, along with fruits such as plums, pomegranates, quince, prunes, apricots and raisins. Characteristic Iranian spices and flavourings such as saffron, cardamom, and dried lime and other sources of sour flavoring, cinnamon, turmeric and parsley are mixed and used in various dishes. Outside of Iran, a strong presence of Iranian cuisine can be found in cities with significant Iranian diaspora populations, namely the San Francisco Bay Area, Toronto, Houston and especially Los Angeles and its environs.

Bread an important food, with a large variety, some of the most popular of which include: nan which is baked in large clay ovens (also called "tenurs"). There are many dishes that are made from dairy products. One of the most popular of which includes yoghurt ("mast")—which has a specific fermentation process that is widely put to use amongst most Iranians. In addition, mast is used to make soup and is vital in the production of oil. In addition to these dairy products, Iranian cuisine involves a lot of dishes cooked from rice. Some popular rice dishes include boiled rice with a variety of ingredients such as meats, vegetables, and seasonings ("plov") including dishes like chelo-horesh, shish kebab with rice, chelo-kebab, rice with lamb, meatballs with rice, and kofte (plain boiled rice). In addition, Iranian cuisine is famous for its sweets. One of the most famous of which includes "baklava" with almonds, cardamom, and egg yolks. Iranian sweets typically involve the use of honey, cinnamon, lime juice, and sprouted wheat grain. One very popular dessert drink in Iran, "sherbet sharbat-portagal", is made from a mixture of orange peel and orange juice boiled in thin sugar syrup and diluted with rose water. The preferred drink of the people of Iran is tea (without milk).

== Religion ==
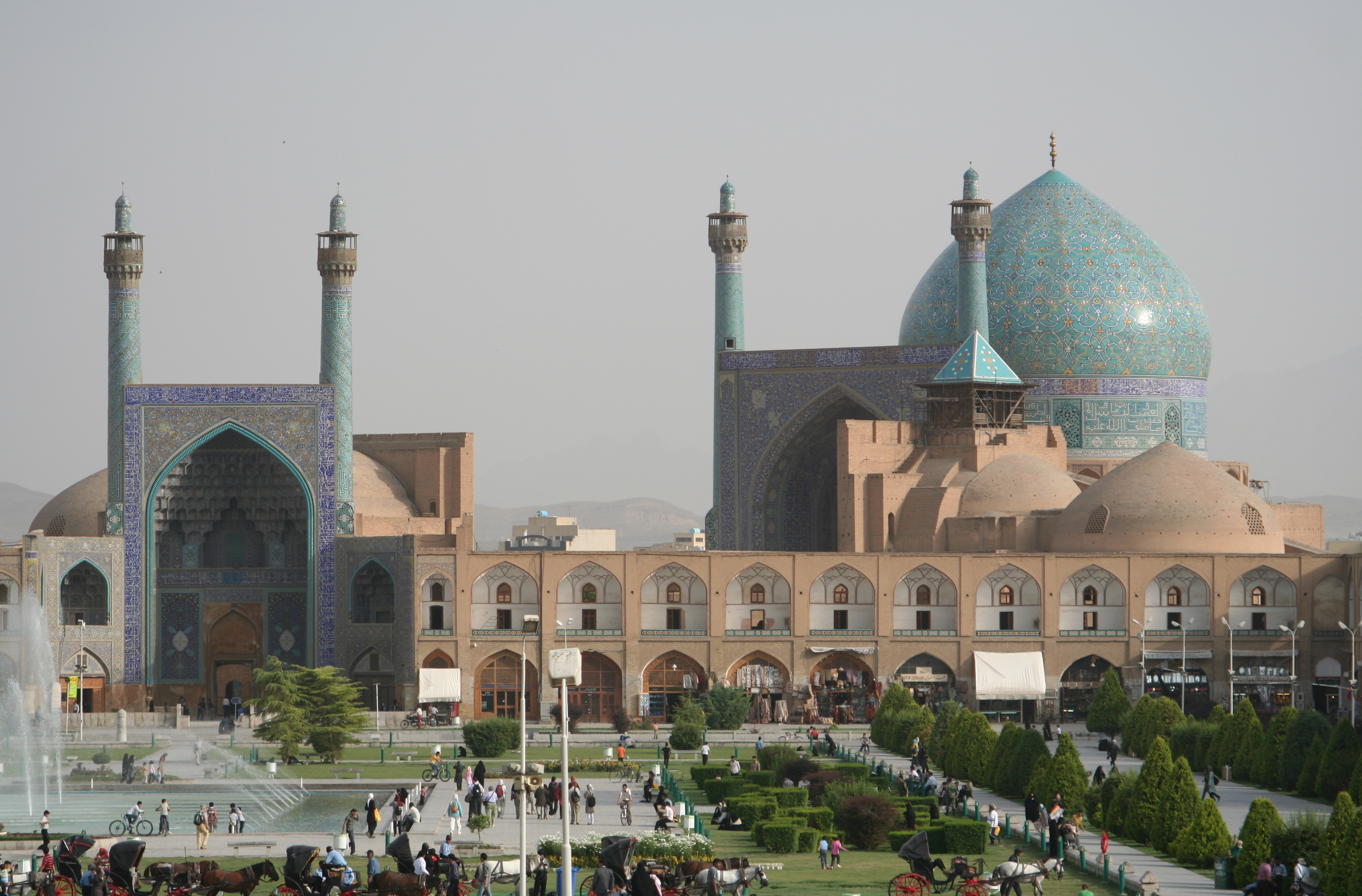
Shah Mosque, Isfahan

Zoroastrianism, the ancient religion of Iran, was the faith of Iran's people for more than a millennium before the Rashidun conquest. It has had an immense influence on Iranian philosophy, culture and art after the people of Iran adopting Islam. The Persian Samanid dynasty made great attempts to spread the Islamic faith in the 9th and 10th century while promoting a Persian cultural revival. Until the 16th century, Iran ushered a golden age of the arts and sciences. In 1501 the Safavid dynasty took control of Iran and made Shia Islam the state religion, with this being one of the most important events in Islamic history.

Of Iran’s Muslim population, about 89% are Shi’a and about 9% are Sunni. Iran has 37–40% of the global Shia population.

Followers of the Baháʼí Faith form the largest non-Muslim minority in Iran. Baháʼís are scattered throughout small communities in Iran, although there seems to be a large population of Baháʼís in Tehran. The Iranian government actively pursues the persecution of Baháʼís.

Followers of the Christian faith consist of around 250,000 Armenians, around 32,000 Assyrians, and a small number of Roman Catholic, Anglican, and Protestant Iranians that have been converted by missionaries in earlier centuries. Thus, Christians that live in Iran are primarily descendants of indigenous Christians that were converted during the 19th and 20th centuries. Judaism is an officially recognized faith in Iran, and in spite of the hostilities between Iran and Israel over the Palestinian issue, the millennia-old Jewish community in Iran enjoys the right to practise their religion freely as well as a dedicated seat in parliament to a representative member of their faith. In addition to Christianity and Judaism, Zoroastrianism is another officially recognized religion in Iran, although followers of this faith do not hold a large population in Iran. In addition, although there have been instances of prejudice against Zoroastrians, most followers of this faith have not faced widespread persecution.

== Philosophy ==
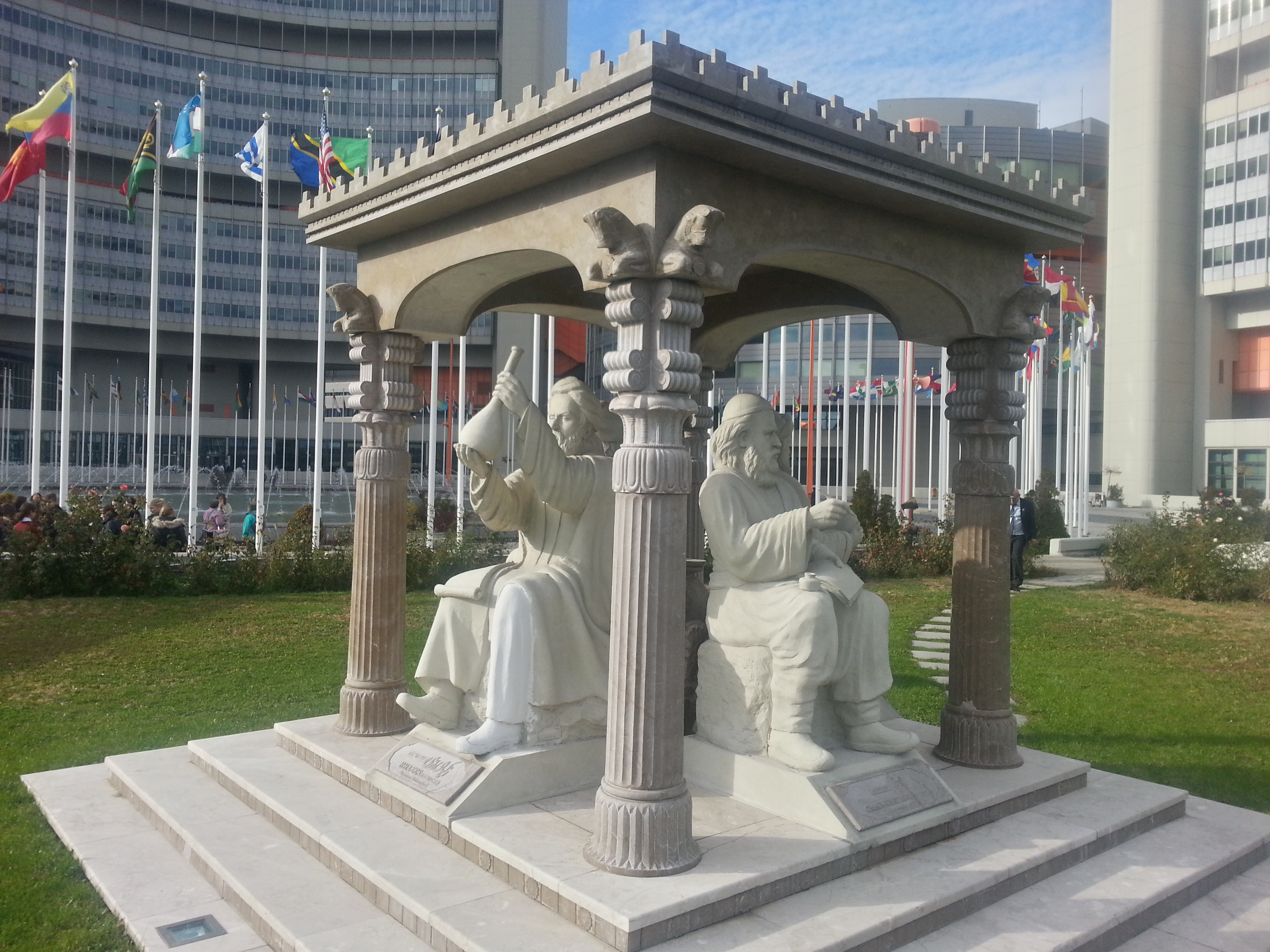
Scholars Pavilion is a monument donated by Iran to the United Nations Office in Vienna, with statues of Iranian mediaeval scholars.

Iranian philosophy can be traced back as far as Old Iranian philosophical traditions and thoughts which originated in ancient Indo-Iranian roots and were influenced by Zarathustra's teachings. Throughout Iranian history and due to remarkable political and social changes such as the Arab and Mongol invasions, a wide spectrum of schools of thoughts showed a variety of views on philosophical questions, extending from Old Iranian and mainly Zoroastrianism-related traditions, to schools appearing in the late pre-Islamic era such as Manichaeism and Mazdakism as well as post-Islamic schools.

The Cyrus Cylinder is seen as a reflection of the questions and thoughts expressed by Zoroaster and developed in Zoroastrian schools of the Achaemenid era. Post-Islam Iranian philosophy is characterised by different interactions with the Old Iranian philosophy, the Greek philosophy and with the development of Islamic philosophy. The Illumination School and the Transcendent Philosophy are regarded as two of the main philosophical traditions of that era in Iran. Contemporary Iranian philosophy has been limited in its scope by intellectual repression.

== Mythology and folklore ==
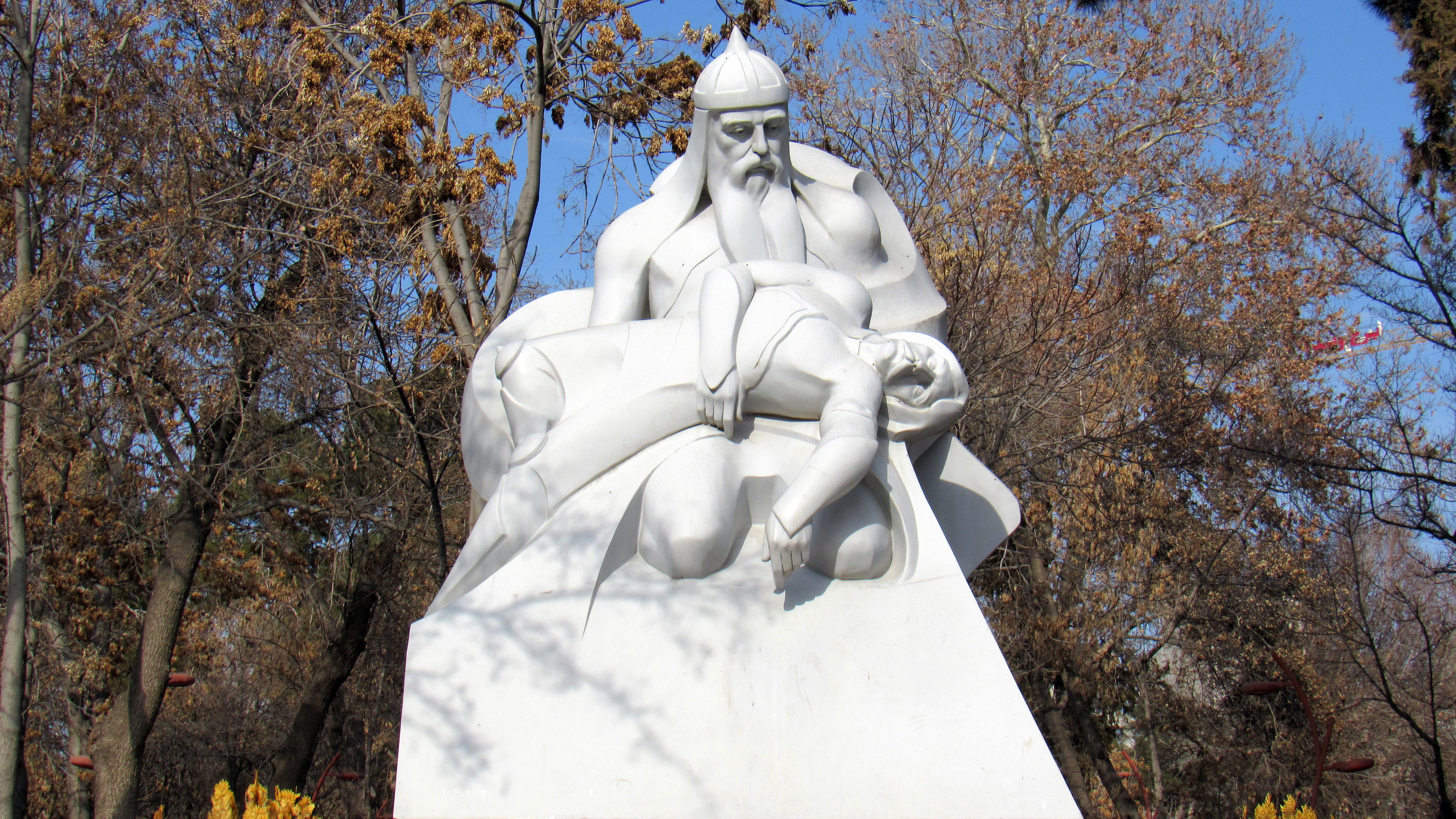
Statue of Rostam, with his son Sohrab, in Sabzevar

Iranian mythology consists of ancient Iranian folklore and stories of extraordinary beings reflecting on good and evil (Ahura Mazda and Ahriman), actions of the gods, and the exploits of heroes and creatures. The tenth-century Persian poet, Ferdowsi, is the author of the national epic known as the Shahnameh ("Book of Kings"), which is for the most part based on Xwadāynāmag, a Middle Persian compilation of the history of Iranian kings and heroes, as well as the stories and characters of the Zoroastrian tradition, from the texts of the Avesta, the Denkard, the Vendidad and the Bundahishn. Modern scholars study the myths to shed light on the religious and political institutions of not only Iran but of the Greater Iran, which includes regions of West Asia, Central Asia, South Asia, and Transcaucasia where the culture of Iran has had significant influence.

Storytelling has a significant presence in Iranian folklore and culture. In classical Iran, minstrels performed for their audiences at royal courts and in public theatres. A minstrel was referred to by the Parthians as gōsān, and by the Sasanians as huniyāgar. Since the Safavid Empire, storytellers and poetry readers appeared at coffeehouses. After the Iranian Revolution, it took until 1985 to found the Ministry of Cultural Heritage, Tourism and Handicrafts, a heavily centralised organisation supervising all kinds of cultural activities. It held the first scientific meeting on anthropology and folklore in 1990.

== Holidays and festivals ==
The Persian year begins in the vernal equinox: if the astronomical vernal equinox comes before noon, then the present day is the first day of the Persian year. If the equinox falls after noon, then the next day is the official first day of the Persian year. The Persian calendar, which is the official calendar of Iran, is a solar calendar with a starting point that is the same as the Islamic calendar. According to the Iran Labor Code, Friday is the weekly day of rest. Government official working hours are from Saturday to Wednesday (from 8 am to 4 pm).

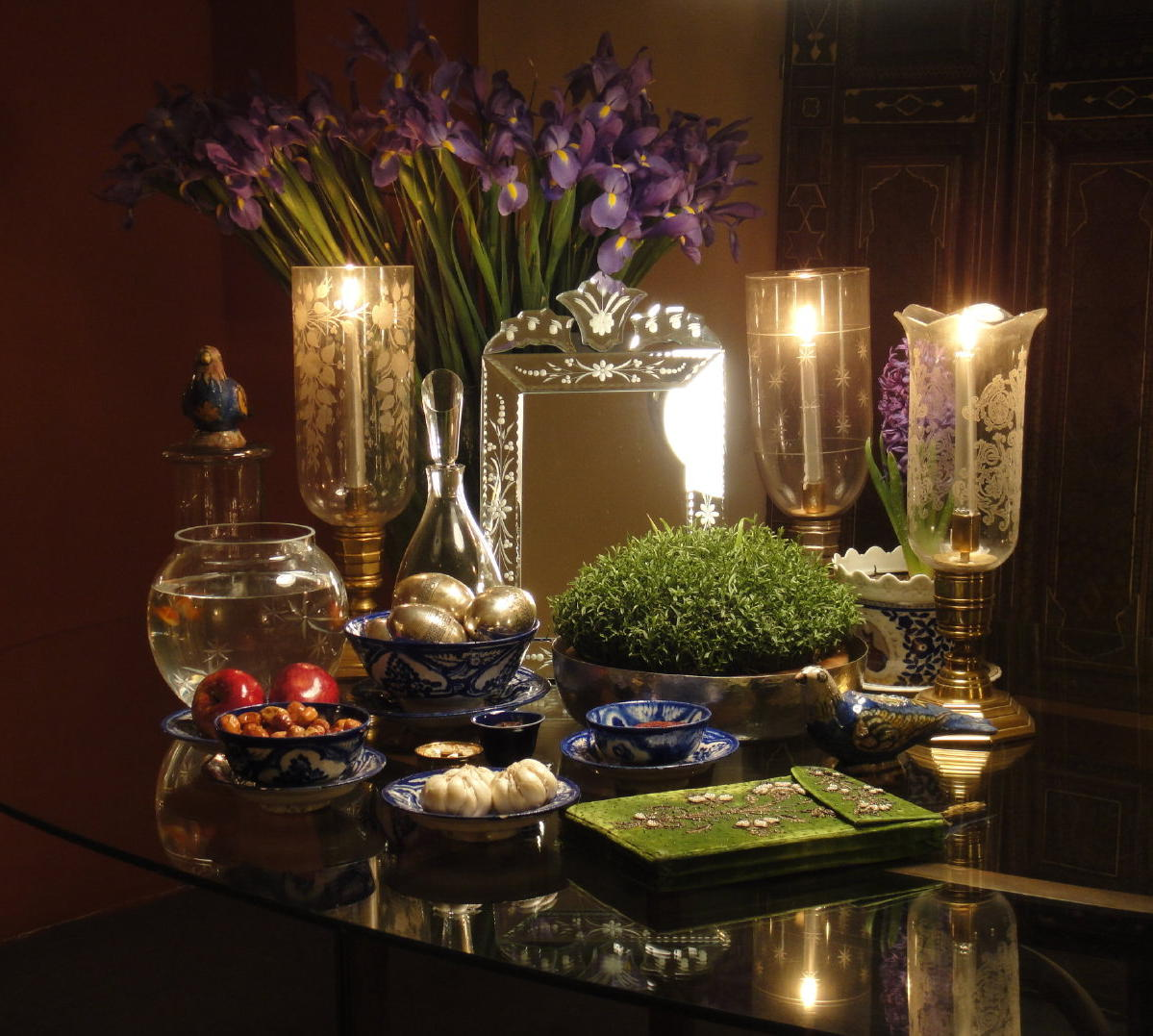
Haft-Seen, a custom of Nowruz, the Iranian New Year

Iran's official New Year begins with Nowruz, an ancient Iranian tradition celebrated annually on the vernal equinox and described as the Persian New Year. It was registered on the UNESCO's list of Masterpieces of the Oral and Intangible Heritage of Humanity in 2009. On the eve of the last Wednesday of the preceding year, as a prelude to Nowruz, the ancient festival of بārڑanbe Suri celebrates Ātar ("fire") by performing rituals such as jumping over bonfires and lighting fireworks.

Yaldā, another ancient tradition, commemorates the ancient goddess Mithra and marks the longest night of the year on the eve of the winter solstice (usually on 20 or 21 December), during which families gather to recite poetry and eat fruits. In some regions of Mazanderan and Markazi, there is a midsummer festival, Tirgān, which is observed on Tir 13 (2 or 3 July) as a celebration of water.

Islamic annual events such as Ramezān, Eid e Fetr, and Ruz e Āڑurā are marked by the country's population, Christian traditions such as Noel, elle ye Ruze, and Eid e Pāk are observed by the Christian communities, Jewish traditions such as Hanukā and Eid e Fatir (Pesah) are observed by the Jewish communities, and Zoroastrian traditions such as Sade and Mehrgān are observed by the Zoroastrians.

Islamic annual events such as Ramezān, Eid e Fetr, and Ruz e Āڑurā are marked by the country's population, Christian traditions such as Noel, elle ye Ruze, and Eid e Pāk are observed by the Christian communities, Jewish traditions such as Hanukā and Eid e Fatir (Pesah) are observed by the Jewish communities, and Zoroastrian traditions such as Sade and Mehrgān are observed by the Zoroastrians.Although the date of certain holidays in Iran are not exact (due to the calendar system they use, most of these holidays are around the same time), some of the major public holidays in Iran include Oil Nationalization Day (20 March). Yalda (which is the longest night of the year) (21 December), the Prophet's Birthday and Imam Sadeq (4 June), and the Death of Imam Khomeini (5 June). Additional holidays include The Anniversary of the Uprising Against the Shah (30 January), Ashoura (11 February), Victory of the 1979 Islamic Revolution (20 January), Sizdah-Bedar—Public Outing Day to end Nowrooz (1 April), and Islamic Republic Day (2 April).

=== Public holidays ===
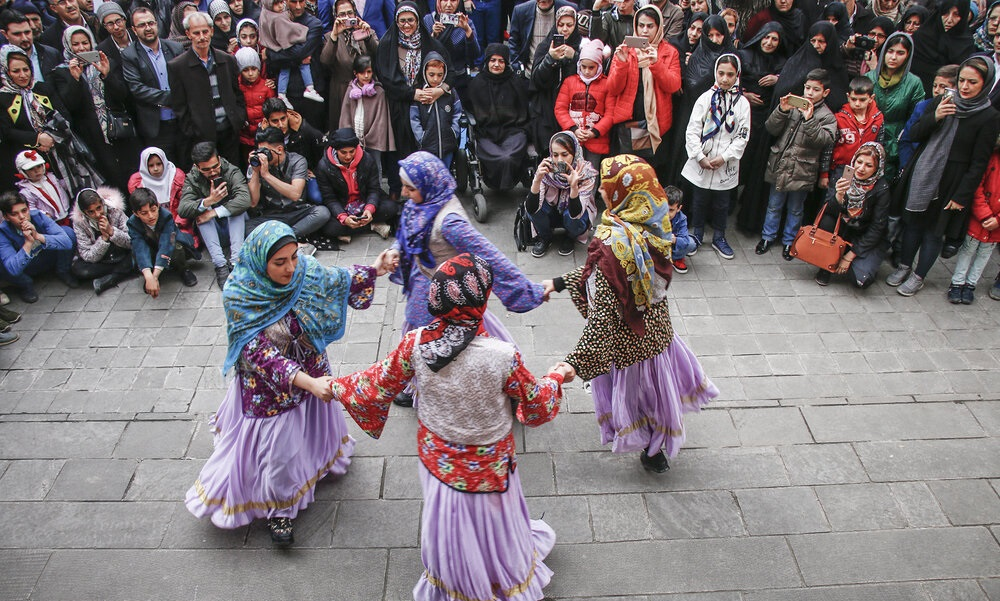
Celebrating Nowruz (Persian New Year) in Tabriz

With 26, Iran has one of the world's highest number of public holidays. It ranks 1st in the world with the most paid leave days: 52. Iran's official calendar is the Solar Hejri calendar, beginning at the vernal equinox in the Northern Hemisphere. Each of the 12 months of the Solar Hejri calendar correspond with a zodiac sign, and the length of each year is solar. Alternatively, the Lunar Hejri calendar is used to indicate Islamic events, and the Gregorian calendar marks international events.

Legal public holidays based on the Iranian solar calendar include the cultural celebrations of Nowruz (Farvardin 1–4; 21–24 March) and Sizdebedar (Farvardin 13; 2 April), and the political events of Islamic Republic Day (Farvardin 12; 1 April), the death of Ruhollah Khomeini (Khordad 14; 4 June), the Khordad 15 event (Khordad 15; 5 June), the anniversary of the Iranian Revolution (Bahman 22; 10 February), and Oil Nationalisation Day (Esfand 29; 19 March).

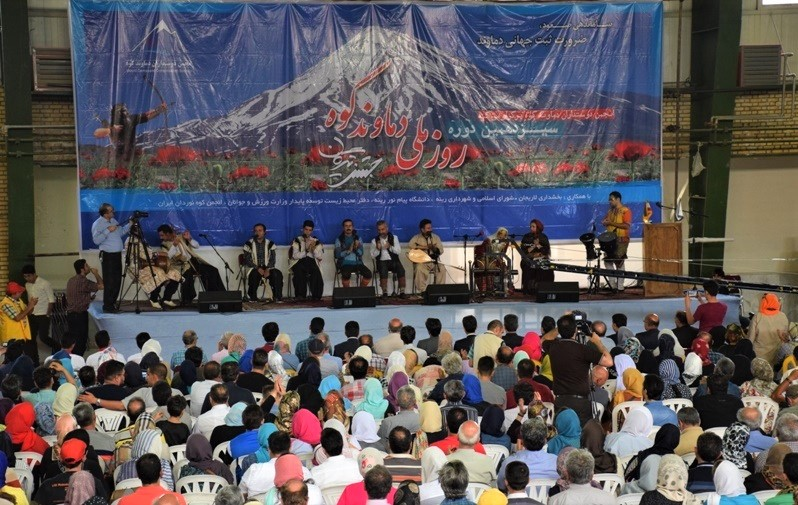
Tirgan and Damavand National Day Festival at Amol

Lunar Islamic public holidays include Tasua (Muharram 9), Ashura (Muharram 10), Arba'een (Safar 20), Muhammad's death (Safar 28), the death of Ali al-Ridha (Safar 29 or 30), the birthday of Muhammad (Rabi-al-Awwal 17), the death of Fatimah (Jumada-al-Thani 3), the birthday of Ali (Rajab 13), Muhammad's first revelation (Rajab 27), the birthday of Muhammad al-Mahdi (Sha'ban 15), the death of Ali (Ramadan 21), Eid al-Fitr (Shawwal 1–2), the death of Ja'far al-Sadiq (Shawwal 25), Eid al-Qurban (Zulhijja 10), and Eid al-Qadir (Zulhijja 18).

== Wedding ceremonies ==
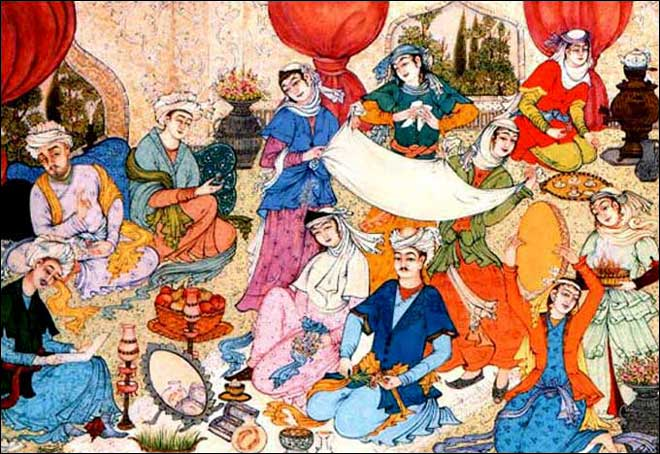
Iranian wedding ceremony

There are two stages in a typical wedding ritual in Iran. Sometimes, both phases take place in one day. The first stage is known as "Aghd", which is basically the legal component of marriage in Iran. In this process, the bride and groom, as well as their respective guardians, sign a marriage contract. This phase usually takes place in the bride's home. After this legal process is over, the second phase, "Jashn-e Aroosi" lasts 3 to 7 days and includes feasts and celebrations. The ceremony takes place in a decorated room with flowers and a beautifully decorated spread on the floor.

This spread is typically passed down from mother to daughter and is composed of very nice fabric such as "Termeh" (cashmere), "Atlas" (gold embroidered satin), or "Abrisham" (silk). Items are placed on the spread include a mirror (of fate), two candelabras (representing the bride and groom and their bright future), a tray of seven multi-colored herbs and spices (including poppy seeds, wild rice, angelica, salt, nigella seeds, black tea, and frankincense). These herbs and spices play specific roles ranging from breaking spells and witchcraft, to blinding the evil eye, to burning evil spirits. In addition to these herbs/spices, a special baked and decorated flatbread, a basket of decorated eggs, decorated almonds, walnuts and hazelnuts (in their shell to represent fertility), a basket of pomegranates/apples (for a joyous future as these fruits are considered divine), a cup of rose water (from special Persian roses)—which helps perfume the air, a bowl made out of sugar (apparently to sweeten life for the newlywed couple), and a brazier holding burning coals and sprinkled with wild rue (as a way to keep the evil eye away and to purify the wedding ritual) are placed on the spread as well. Additional items include a bowl of gold coins (to represent wealth and prosperity), a scarf/shawl made of silk/fine fabric (to be held over the bride and groom's head at certain points in the ceremony), two sugar cones (which are ground above the bride and groom's head, thus symbolizing sweetness/happiness), a cup of honey (to sweeten life), a needle and seven strands of colored thread (the shawl that is held above the bride and groom's head is sewn together with the string throughout the ceremony), and a copy of the couple's Holy Book (other religions require different texts); but all of these books symbolize God's blessing for the couple.

An early age in marriage—especially for brides—is a long documented feature of marriage in Iran. While the people of Iran have been trying to legally change this practice by implementing a higher minimum in marriage, there have been countless blocks to such attempts. Although the average age of women being married has increased by about five years in the past couple decades, young girls being married is still common feature of marriage in Iran—even though there is an article in the Iranian Civil Code that forbid the marriage of women younger than 15 years of age and males younger than 18 years of age.

== Persian rugs ==
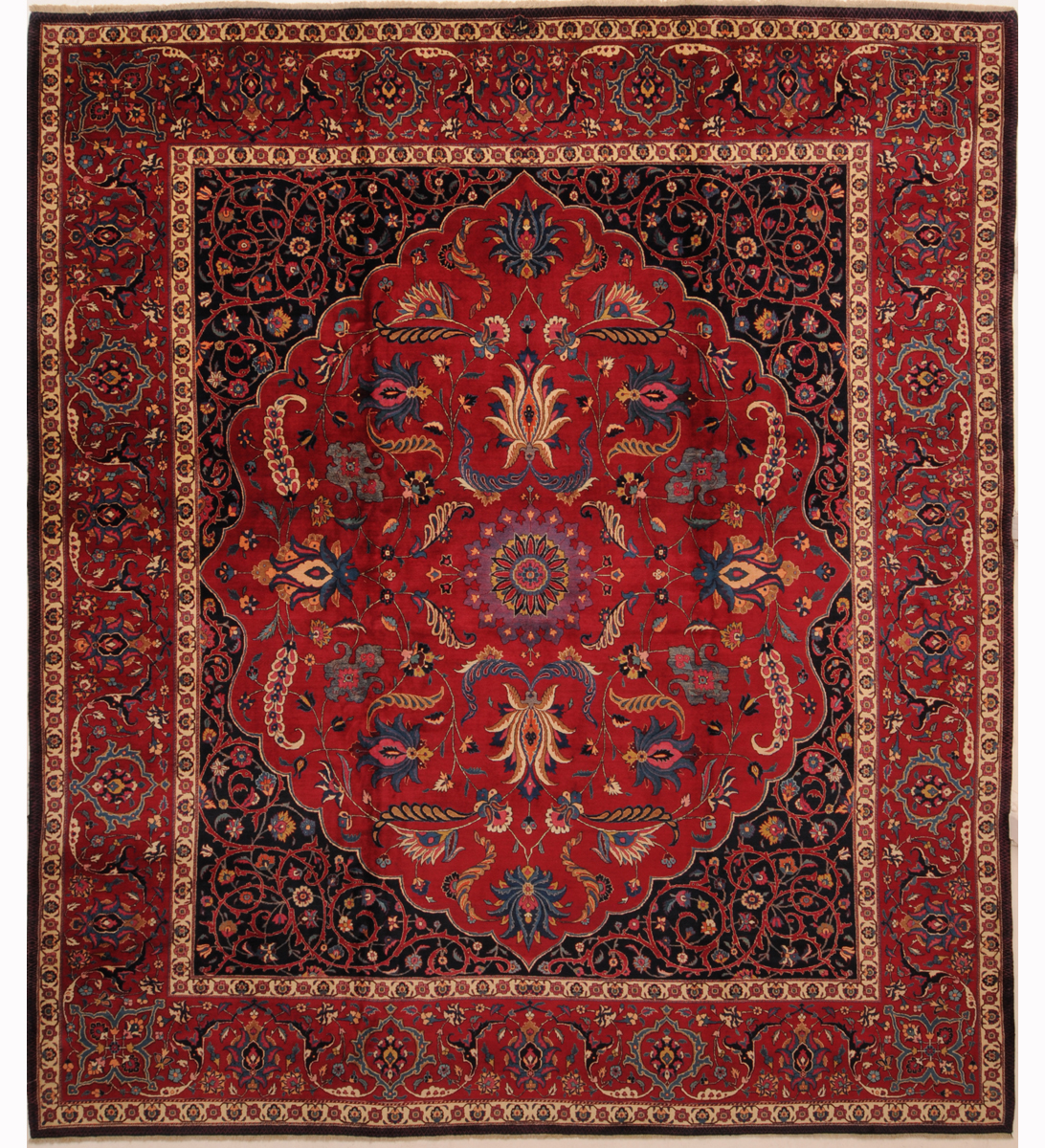
Antique Persian Mashad rug

In Iran, Persian rugs have always been a vital part of the Persian culture. Iranians were some of the first people in history to weave carpets. First deriving from the notion of basic need, the Persian rug started out as a simple/pure weave of fabric that helped nomadic people living in ancient Iran stay warm from the cold, damp ground. As time progressed, the complexity and beauty of rugs increased to a point where rugs are now bought as decorative pieces. Because of the long history of fine silk and wool rug weaving in Iran, Persian rugs are world-renowned as some of the most beautiful, intricately designed rugs available. Around various places in Iran, rugs seem to be some of the most prized possessions of the local people. Iran currently produces more rugs and carpets than all other countries in the world put together.

=== Fashion and clothing ===
The date of the emergence of weaving in Iran is not known, but it is likely to coincide with the emergence of civilisation. Ferdowsi and many historians have considered Keyumars to be first to use animals' skin and hair as clothing, while others propose Hushang. Ferdowsi considers Tahmuras to be a kind of textile initiator in Iran. The clothing of ancient Iran took an advanced form, and the fabric and colour of clothing became very important. Depending on the social status, eminence, climate of the region and the season, Persian clothing during the Achaemenian period took various forms. This clothing, in addition to being functional, had an aesthetic role.

=== Cinema, animation, and theatre ===
Reproduction of a 3rd millennium BC goblet from Shahr-e Sukhteh, possibly the world's oldest animation, at the National Museum of Iran

A 3rd-millennium BC earthen goblet discovered at the Burnt City in southeast Iran depicts what could be the world's oldest example of animation. The earliest attested Iranian examples of visual representations, however, are traced back to the bas-reliefs of Persepolis, the ritual centre of the Achaemenid Empire.

The first Iranian filmmaker was probably Mirza Ebrahim (Akkas Bashi), the court photographer of Mozaffar-ed-Din of the Qajar Empire. Mirza Ebrahim obtained a camera and filmed the Qajar ruler's visit to Europe. In 1904, Mirza Ebrahim (Sahhaf Bashi) opened the first public cinema in Tehran. The first Iranian feature film, Abi and Rabi, was a silent comedy directed by Ovanes Ohanian in 1930. The first sound one, Lor Girl, was produced by Ardeshir Irani and Abd-ol-Hosein Sepanta in 1932. Iran's animation industry began by the 1950s and was followed by the establishment of the influential Institute for the Intellectual Development of Children and Young Adults in 1965.

With the screening of the films Qeysar and The Cow, directed by Masoud Kimiai and Dariush Mehrjui respectively in 1969, alternative films set out to establish their status in the film industry and Bahram Beyzai's Downpour and Nasser Taghvai's Tranquility in the Presence of Others followed. Attempts to organise a film festival, which had begun in 1954 within the Golrizan Festival, resulted in the festival of Sepas in 1969. It also resulted in the formation of Tehran's World Film Festival in 1973.

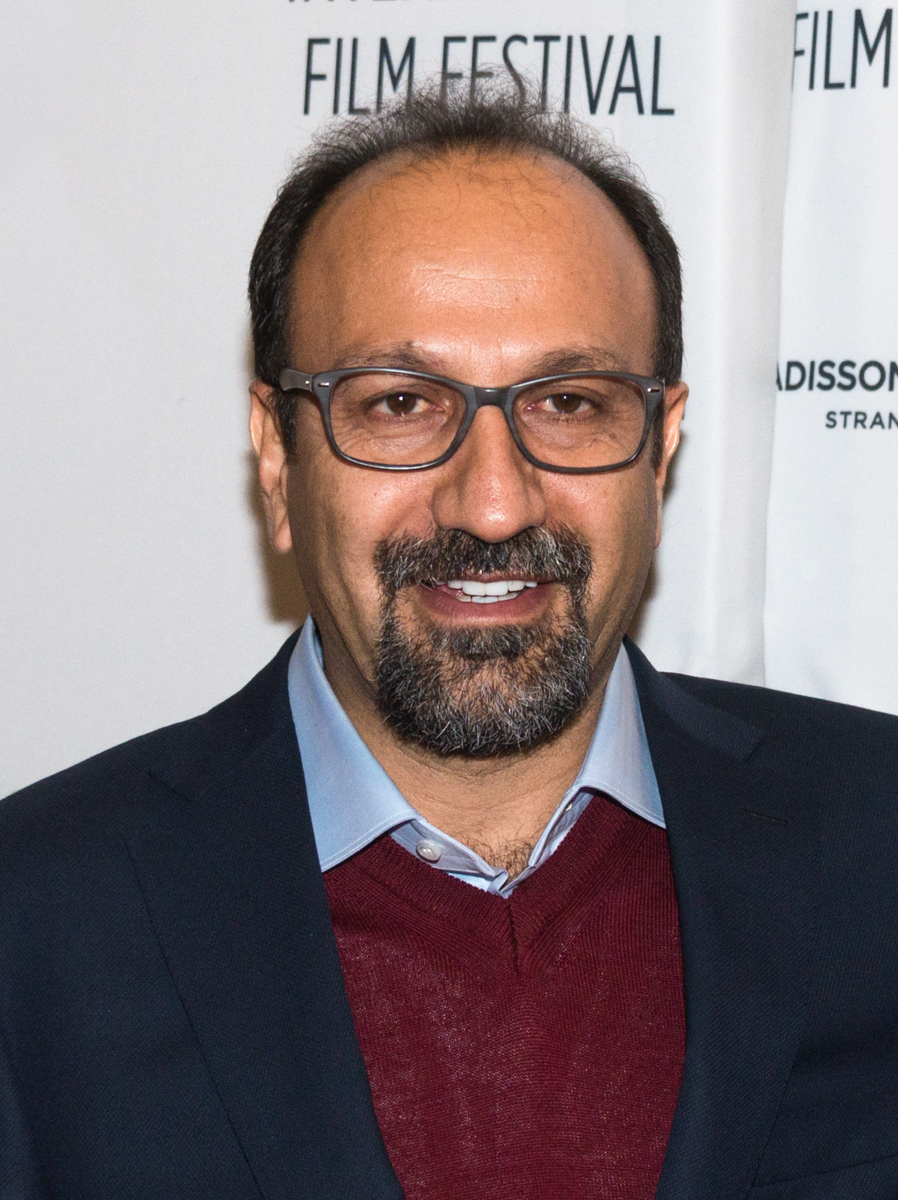
Asghar Farhadi, two-time Academy Award winner and a prominent filmmaker in the 21st century

Following the Cultural Revolution, a new age emerged in Iranian cinema, starting with Long Live! by Khosrow Sinai and followed by other directors, such as Abbas Kiarostami and Jafar Panahi. Kiarostami, an acclaimed director, planted Iran firmly on the map of world cinema when he won the Palme d'Or for Taste of Cherry in 1997. The presence of Iranian films in prestigious international festivals, such as Cannes, Venice and Berlin, attracted attention to Iranian films. In 2006, 6 films represented Iranian cinema at Berlin; critics considered this a remarkable event in Iranian cinema. Asghar Farhadi, an Iranian director, has received a Golden Globe Award and two Academy Awards, representing Iran for Best Foreign Language Film in 2012 and 2017, with A Separation and The Salesman. In 2020, Ashkan Rahgozar's "The Last Fiction" became the first representative of Iranian animated cinema in the competition section, in Best Animated Feature and Best Picture categories at the Academy Awards.

The oldest Iranian initiation of theatre can be traced to ancient epic ceremonial theatres such as Sug-e Siāvuڑ ("mourning of Siāvaڑ"), as well as dances and theatre narrations of Iranian mythological tales reported by Herodotus and Xenophon. Iran's traditional theatrical genres include Baqqāl-bāzi ("grocer play", a form of slapstick comedy), Ruhowzi (or Taxt-howzi, comedy performed over a courtyard pool covered with boards), Siāh-bāzi (the central comedian appears in blackface), Sāye-bāzi (shadow play), Xeyme-ڑab-bāzi (marionette), and Arusak-bāzi (puppetry), and Ta'zie (religious tragedy plays).

The Roudaki Hall is home to the Tehran Symphony Orchestra, the Tehran Opera Orchestra, and the Iranian National Ballet Company, and was officially renamed Vahdat Hall after the revolution.

== Sports ==
The game of polo originated with Iranian tribes in ancient times and was regularly seen throughout the country until the revolution of 1979 when it became associated with the monarchy. It continues to be played, but only in rural areas and discreetly. Recently, as of 2005, it has been gaining more attention. In March 2006, there was a highly publicized tournament and all significant matches are televised.

== Women in Persian culture ==
Since the 1979 Revolution, Iranian women have lost nearly all the rights they had gained in 1962 under the rule of Mohammad Reza Pahlavi. Many restrictive and legal measures have been imposed since 1979, including mandatory Hijab. By law, women's testimony in court is worth half of that of men under the rule of the Islamic Regime, the age of consent for women is 9, and marital rape is legal. Women cannot leave the country without the formal permission of their guardians (father or husband). They cannot run for presidency or become a judge. This is a striking change from the full and equal rights that women enjoyed during the Pahlavi era. The Iranian women who had gained confidence and higher education during the Pahlavi era participated in demonstrations against the Shah to topple the monarchy. The culture of education for women was very strongly established by the time of revolution so that even after the revolution, large numbers of women entered civil service and higher education. Even though the Islamic Republic pushed back on women's rights, Iranian women have been at the forefront of progress, education and battle for freedom. In 1996, 14 women were elected to the Islamic Consultative Assembly. In 2003, Iran's first female judge during the Pahlavi era, Shirin Ebadi, won the Nobel Peace Prize for her efforts in promoting human rights.

According to a UNESCO world survey, at the primary level of enrolment, Iran has the highest female to male ratio among all other sovereign nations, with a female to male ratio of 1.22 : 1.00. By 1999, Iran had 140 female publishers, enough to hold an exhibition of books and magazines published by women. As of 2005, 65% of Iran's university students and 43% of its salaried workers were women. and as of early 2007 nearly 70% of Iran's science and engineering students are women. This has led to many female school and university graduates being under-utilized. This has started to have an effect on Iranian society and was a contributing factor in protests by Iranian youth in over the past decades.

In recent decades, Iranian women have had a significant presence in Iran's scientific movement, art movement, literary new wave and contemporary Iranian cinema. Women account for 60% of all students in the natural sciences, including one in five PhD students.

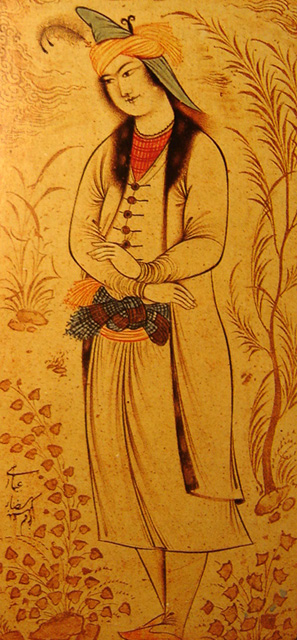
Prince Muhammad-Beik of Georgia, 1620. Artist is Reza Abbasi.

== Contributions to humanity in ancient history ==
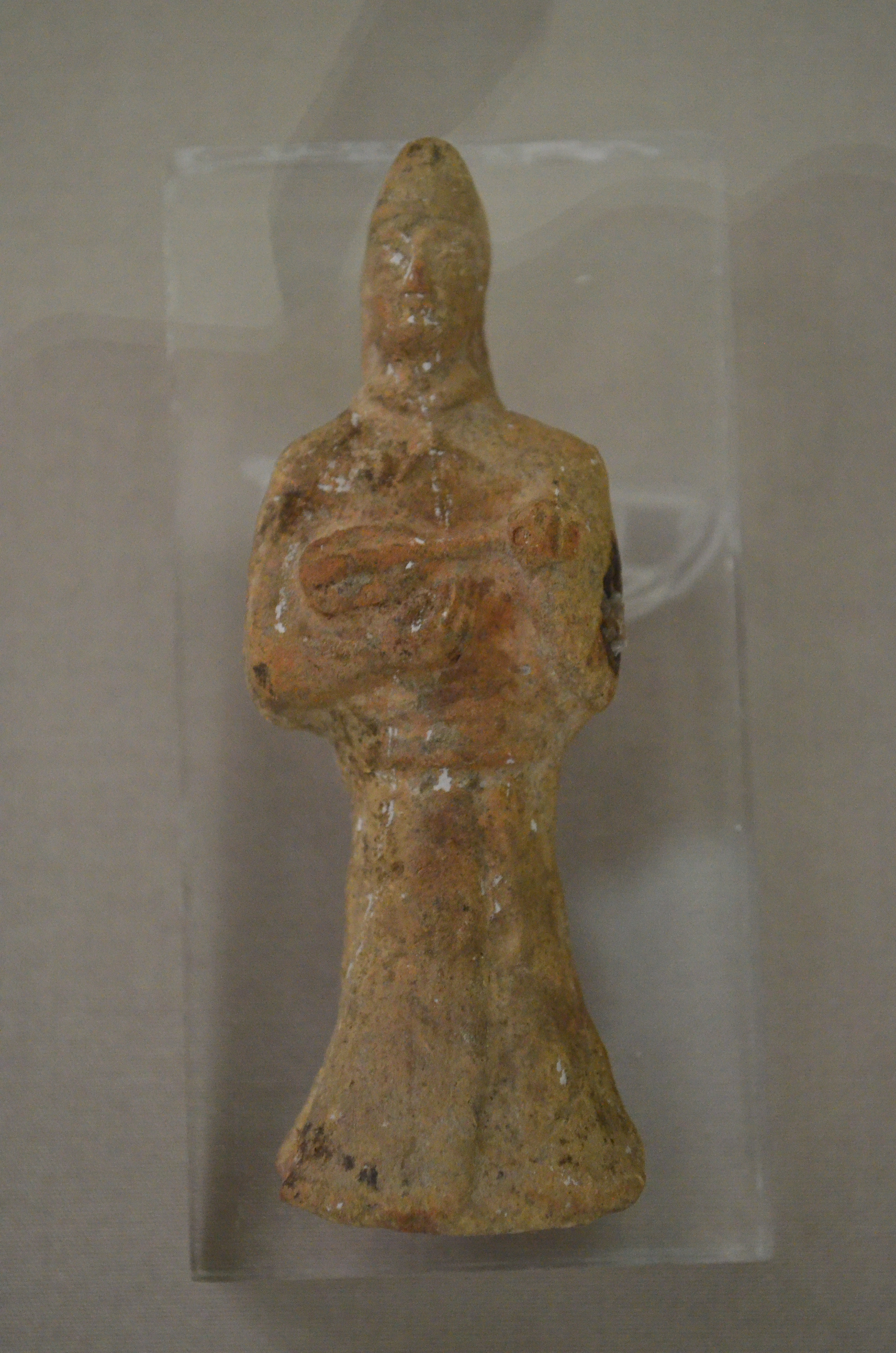
Figurine holding a stringed instrument (early tanbur or lute). First half of second millennium BC. Susa. Kept at the National Museum of Iran.

From the brick to the windmill, Persians were creative with art and offered the world significant contributions. What follows is a few examples of the cultural contributions of Greater Iran.

- (10,000 BC) – Earliest known domestication of the goat.
- (6000 BC) – The modern brick. Some of the oldest bricks found to date are Persian, from c. 6000 BC.
- (5000 BC) – Invention of wine. Discovery made by University of Pennsylvania excavations at Hajji Firuz Tepe in northwestern Iran.
- (5000 BC) – Invention of the Tar (lute), which led to the development of the guitar.
- (3000 BC) – The ziggurat. The Sialk ziggurat, according to the Cultural Heritage Organization of Iran, predates that of Ur or any other of Mesopotamia's 34 ziggurats.
- (3000 BC) – A game resembling backgammon appears in the east of Iran.
- (1400 BC – 600 BC) – Zoroastrianism: where the first prophet of a monotheistic faith arose according to some scholars, claiming Zoroastrianism as being "the oldest of the revealed credal religions, which has probably had more influence on mankind directly or indirectly, more than any other faith".
- (576 BC – 529 BC) – The Cyrus Cylinder: The world's first charter of human rights.
- (521 BC) – The game of polo.
- (500 BC) – First banking system, at the time of the Achaemenid, establishment of Governmental Banks to help farmers at the time of drought, floods, and other natural disasters in form of loans and forgiveness loans to restart their farms and husbandries. These Governmental Banks were effective in different forms until the end of Sassanian Empire before the Arab invasion of Persia.
- (500 BC) – The word "check" has a Persian root in the old Persian language. The use of this document as a check was in use from Achaemenid time to the end of Sassanian Empire. The word of [Bonchaq, or Bonchagh] in modern Persian language is new version of old Avestan and Pahlavi language "check". In Persian, it means a document which resembles money value for gold, silver and property. By law, people were able to buy and sell these documents or exchange them.
- (500 BC) – World's oldest staple.
- (500 BC) – The first taxation system (under the Achaemenid Empire).
- (500 BC) – "Royal Road" – the first courier post.
- (500 BC) – Source for introduction of the domesticated chicken into Europe.
- (500 BC) – First cultivation of spinach.
- (400 BC) – Yakhchals, ancient refrigerators.
- (400 BC) – Ice cream.
- (250 BC) – Original excavation of the Ancient Suez Canal, begun under Darius, completed under the Ptolemies.
- (50 AD) – Peaches, a fruit of Chinese origin, were introduced to the west through Persia, as indicated by their Latin scientific name, Prunus persica, from which (by way of the French) we have the English word "peach".
- (271 AD) – Academy of Gundishapur – The first hospital.
- (700 AD) – The cookie.
- (700 AD) – The windmill.
- (864 AD – 930 AD) – First systematic use of alcohol in Medicine: Rhazes.
- (1000 AD) – Tulips were first cultivated in medieval Persia.
- (1000 AD) – Introduction of paper to the west.
- (935 AD – 1020 AD) – Ferdowsi writes the Shahnama (Book of Kings) that resulted in the revival of Iranian culture and the expansion of the Iranian cultural sphere.
- (980 AD – 1037 AD) – Avicenna, a physician, writes The Canon of Medicine, one of the foundational manuals in the history of modern medicine.
- (1048 AD – 1131 AD) – Khayyam, one of the greatest polymaths of all time, presents a theory of heliocentricity to his peers. His contributions to laying the foundations of algebra are also noteworthy.
- (1207 AD – 1273 AD) – Rumi writes poetry and in 1997, the translations were best-sellers in the United States.
- Algebra and trigonometry: Iranian scientists were directly responsible for the establishment of Algebra, the advancement of Medicine and Chemistry, and the discovery of Trigonometry.
- Qanat, subterranean aqueducts.
- Wind catchers, ancient air residential conditioning.

== See also ==
- Ministry of Cultural Heritage, Tourism and Handicrafts
- International Rankings of Iran in Culture
- Encyclopædia Iranica (30-volume encyclopaedia of Iran's culture; edited and published by Columbia University & funded by the National Endowment for the Humanities)
- Higher education in Iran
- Iranian studies
- Mass media in Iran
- Museums in Iran
- Persian theatre
- Persian names
- Persianate society
- Persianization
- Persophilia, the admiration of Iranians and their culture
- Taarof (Persian form of civility emphasizing both deference and social rank)
