= Fakhrozzaman Jabbar Vaziri =

Iranian actress

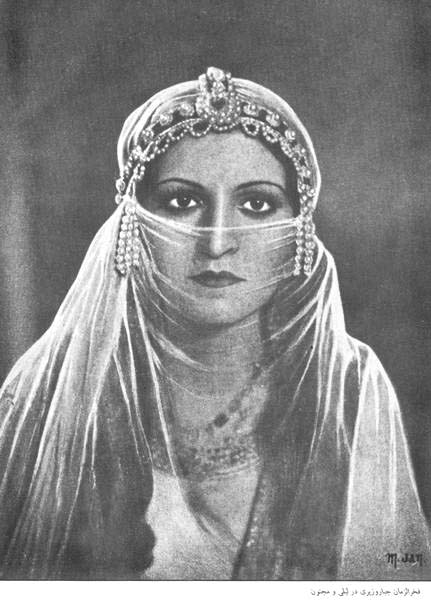
- Detail of Leyli and Majnun theatrical poster
- Born: 1912
- Died: 2009 (aged 96–97)
- Occupation: actress
- Notable work: Shirin and Farhad, The Black Eyes, Leili and Majnun

Fakhrozzaman Jabbar Vaziri (Persian: فخرالزمان جبار وزیری; 1912 – 2009) was an Iranian actress. She was one of the pioneering actresses of Iranian cinema and mostly famous for playing in three Iranina films directed by Abdolhossein Sepanta. These three film are Shirin and Farhad, The Black Eyes and Leili and Majnun.
