= Roohangiz Saminejad =

Iranian actress

- روح‌انگیز سامی‌نژاد
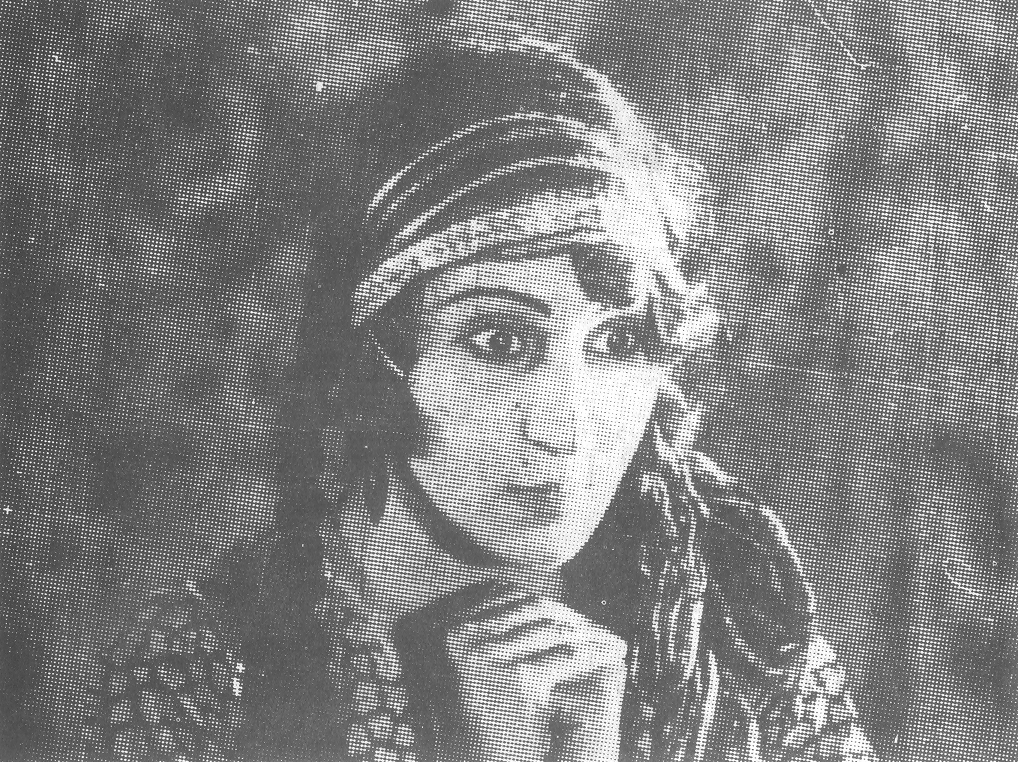
- Roohangiz Saminejad in Lor Girl
- Born: 24 June 1916; Bam, Iran
- Died: 30 April 1997 (aged 80); Tehran, Iran
- Occupation: Actress
- Known for: Lor Girl
- Spouse(s): Reza Damavandi (1932–1940, divorced); Nosratollah Mohtasham (1943–1947, divorced); Ali Omrani (1948–1990, his death)

Roohangiz Saminejad (24 June 1916 – 3 April 1997) was an Iranian actress. She is famous in Iran for playing the heroine Golnar in Lor Girl (1934), which was the first film made in the Persian language, making her the first Iranian film star in a talkie film.

Roohangiz Saminejad was not a professional actress. She was the wife of an employee of the film company. She was discovered by Abdolhossein Sepenta, who had almost despaired of finding an actress with the right look for the film. Her strong Kermani accent required some changes to the script to account for it.

She only made one more film, Shirin and Farhad, also produced by Sepenta. According to Hamid Reza Sadr, she suffered social ostracism in the conservative culture of the time for becoming an actress. She also experienced sexual harassment from men when she went out in public. She had to change her name and lived in anonymity and seclusion.
