= A New Prologue to the Shahnameh =

- Author: Bahram Beyzai
- Original title: دیباچه‌ی نوین شاهنامه
- Translator: Mohammad Mehdi Khorrami & Pari Shirazi
- Cover artist: Aydin Aghdashloo
- Language: Persian
- Genre: Screenplay
- Publication date: 1990
- Publication place: Iran
- English publication date: 2008
- Pages: 118
- ISBN: 964-5512-35-2

A New Prologue to the Shahnameh (Persian: دیباچه‌ی نوین شاهنامه) is an unproduced screenplay by Bahram Beyzai, written in 1986 and first published in 1990. It consists of an imaginary account of the life and times of Ferdowsi.

Abdolali Dastgheib praised the book in an extensive review and, later, among others, Soheila Najm studied it in a series of articles.

== In English ==
An English translation appeared in 2008 in an anthology named Sohrab's Wars:

- Khorrami, Mohammad Mehdi and Pari Shirazi. Sohrab's Wars: Counter Discourses of Contemporary Persian Fiction, A Collection of Short Stories and a Film Script. Costa Mesa: Mazda Publishers, 2008. ISBN 978-1-56859-224-4

== See also ==
- Ferdowsi (film)
