= Indian Motion Picture Producers' Association =

Indian Producers Association

IMPPA
- Indian Motion Picture Producers’ Association
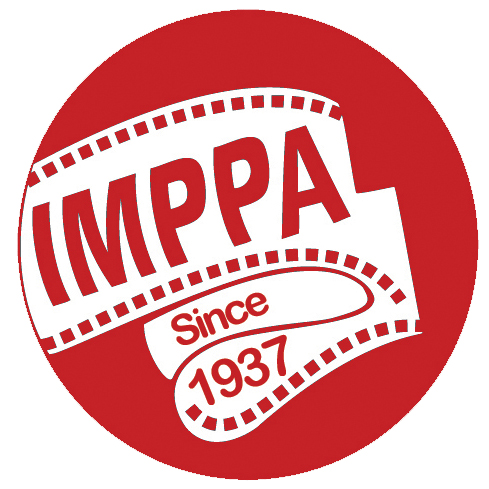
- Official Logo
- Abbreviation: IMPPA
- Established: 1937; 89 years ago
- Founder: Ardeshir Irani
- Type: Nonprofit organization
- Purpose: Registration and Arbitration
- Headquarters: Crescent Tower, G-1 to 7, New Link Rd, Nr. Morya House, 0pp. Infinity Mall, Veera Desai Industrial Estate, Andheri West, Mumbai, Maharashtra, India 400053.
- Region served: Worldwide
- Members: 25000
- Key people: Abhay Sinha, President; Sushama Shiromanee, Sr.Vice President; Tinu Verma, Vice President; Atul Patel, Vice President; Kuku Kohli, General Secretary; Babubhai Thiba, Treasurer
- Affiliations: Film Federation of India and FIAPF
- Website: www.imppa.info

The Indian Motion Picture Producers Association (IMPPA) is an association of film producers established in 1937. As a non-profit organization, it functions as a film registration body and service to address issues for producers within the industry.

== History ==
Trade organizations in the Indian film industry began forming long before workers’ unions appeared in the late 1950s. The first known trade body was the Bombay Cinema and Theaters Trade Organization, created in 1926, followed by the Madras Cinema and Theater League in 1929. However, it was in 1932, a more organized industry activity started with the formation of the Motion Picture Society of India in erstwhile Bombay, which also held the first All India Motion Picture Convention in 1935 under the leadership of B. V. Jadhav. In 1937, film producers informally created the Indian Motion Picture Producers Association, which was officially registered in 1938 with Ardeshir Irani as President and Chandulal Shah as Vice President.

== Activities ==
IMPPA serves as a central registry for film titles, television serials, web series, and other motion picture content produced by its members. This industry practice helps prevent title conflicts, although it does not provide statutory legal protection equivalent to a trademark.

In recent years, IMPPA has participated in international film events, including the Cannes Film Festival and the International Film Festival of India, where it hosted a luxury yacht networking venue in 2024.

== Controversies ==
=== Disputes with Federation of Western India Cine Employees ===
IMPPA has had ongoing conflicts with cine workers' unions. In 2021, IMPPA filed a police complaint against FWICE, and there were mutual accusations of false claims regarding a housing scheme for workers. In the past, IMPPA also approached the Competition Commission of India alleging monopolistic practices by FWICE and its affiliates in forcing producers to use their services.

=== IMPPA’s Appeal Over ‘Dhurandhar’ Ban ===
The Indian Motion Picture Producers' Association, led by President Abhay Sinha, appealed to Indian Prime Minister Narendra Modi and Maharashtra Deputy Chief Minister Devendra Fadnavis to intervene regarding the ban imposed on the Hindi film Dhurandhar by countries including the United Arab Emirates, Bahrain, Kuwait, Qatar, Oman, and Saudi Arabia. IMPPA stated that the restriction undermines freedom of expression despite the film being certified by India’s Central Board of Film Certification and emerging as one of the highest-grossing Hindi films in Indian cinema.
