= Ferdowsi (film) =

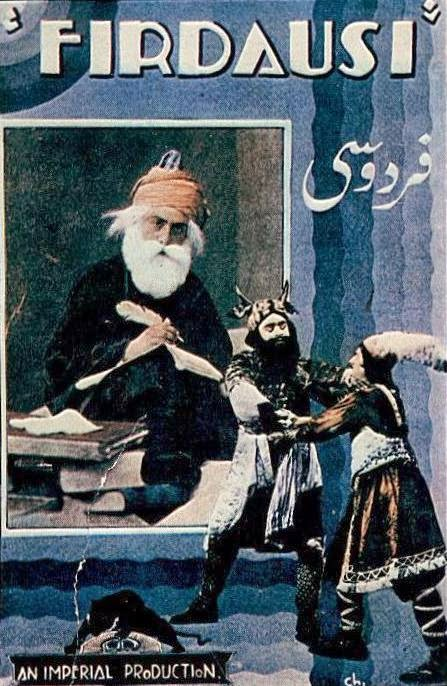
- Directed by: Abdolhossein Sepanta
- Written by: Abdolhossein Sepanta
- Produced by: Ardeshir Irani
- Starring: Nosratollah Mohtasham; Abdolhossein Sepanta; Sohrab Pouri
- Release date: 1934
- Running time: 90 minutes
- Country: Iran
- Language: Persian

Ferdowsi (Ferdausi) (Persian title: Ferdosi- Persian: فردوسی) is a 1934 Iranian biography drama film directed by Abdolhossein Sepanta and starring Nosratollah Mohtasham, Abdolhossein Sepanta and Sohrab Pouri.

The movie is about the famous Iranian poet Ferdowsi, author of the Shahnameh book of epic poems. The film was restored in 2023 by the Film Archive of Iran.

== See also ==
- A New Prologue to the Shahnameh
