= Shirin and Farhad (film) =

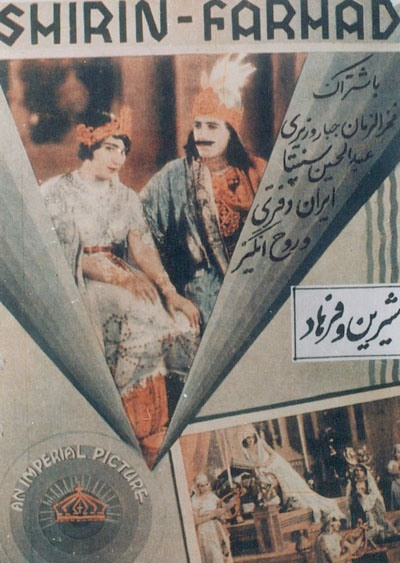
- Directed by: Abdolhossein Sepanta
- Written by: Abdolhossein Sepanta
- Produced by: Ardeshir Irani
- Starring: Abdolhossein Sepanta; Fakhrozzaman Jabbar Vaziri; Iran Daftari; Roohangiz Saminejad
- Release date: 1934
- Running time: 90 minutes
- Country: Iran
- Language: Persian

Shirin and Farhad (Persian: شیرین و فرهاد, romanized: Shirin-o Farhad) is a 1934 Iranian romance film directed by Abdolhossein Sepanta and produced by Ardeshir Irani's Imperial Films of Bombay; starring Sepanta, Fakhrozzaman Jabbar Vaziri, Iran Daftari and Roohangiz Saminejad.
