= Black Eyes (1936 film) =

1936 film

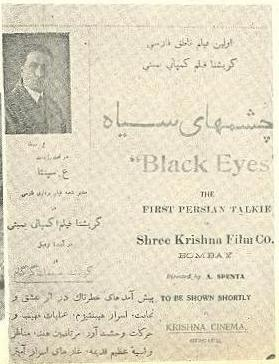
- Directed by: Abdolhossein Sepanta
- Written by: Abdolhossein Sepanta
- Produced by: Patel
- Starring: Fakhrozzaman Jabbar Vaziri; Abdolhossein Sepanta; Sohrab Pouri; Golab; Shami; Amir Hosseini
- Release date: 1936
- Running time: 90 minutes
- Country: Iran
- Language: Persian

Black Eyes (Persian: چشم‌های سیاه, romanized: Cheshmha-y-e Siah) is a 1936 Iranian romance film directed by Abdolhossein Sepanta and produced by the Shree Krishna Film Co. of Bombay and starring Fakhrozzaman Jabbar Vaziri, Abdolhossein Sepanta and Sohrab Pouri.
