= Ardeshir Irani =

Indian writer, director and producer (1886–1969)

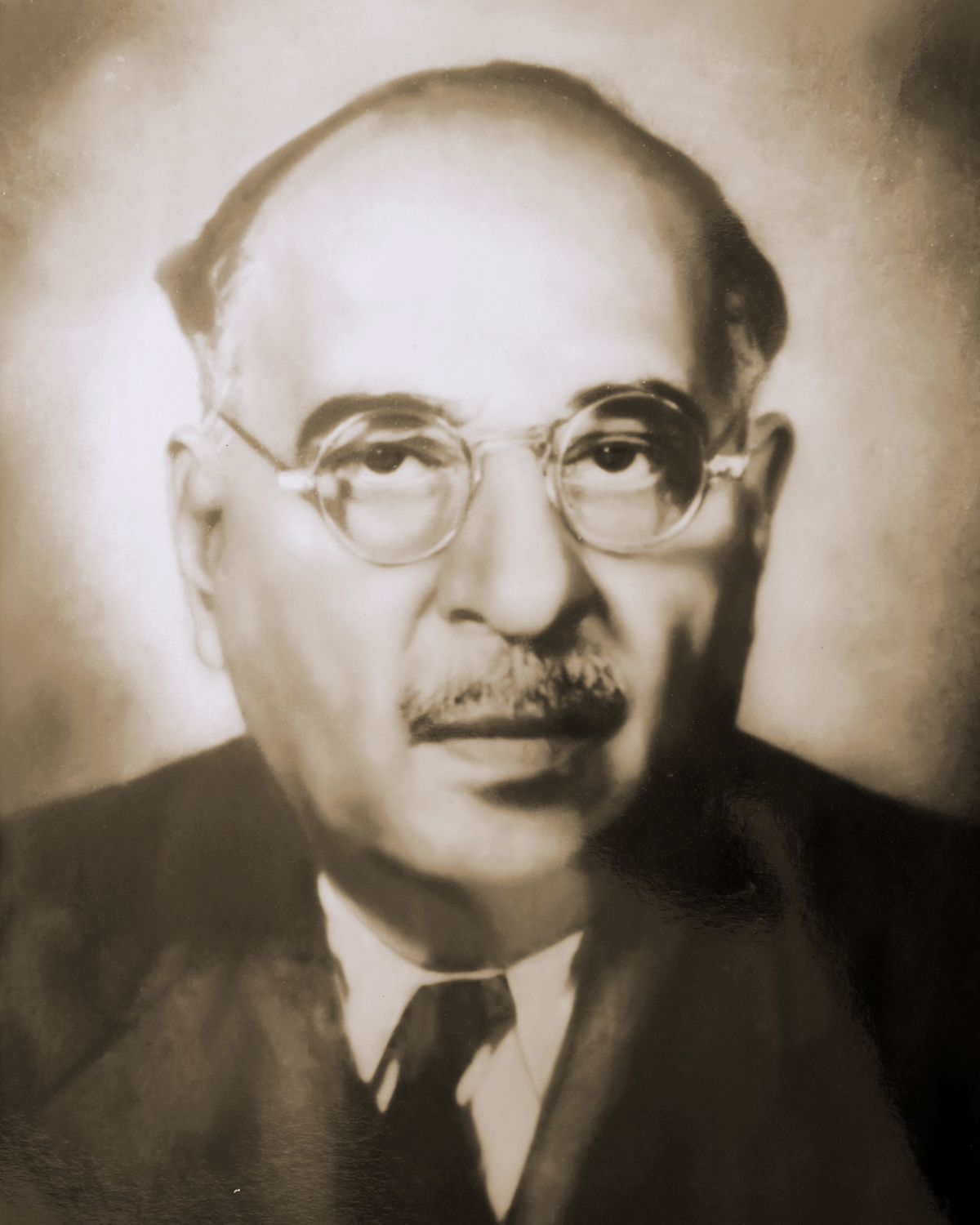
- Ardeshir Irani in 1937 IMPPA President
- Born: Khan Bahadur Ardeshir Irani; 5 December 1886; Poona, Bombay Presidency, British India (now Pune, Maharashtra)
- Died: 14 October 1969 (aged 82); Bombay, Maharashtra, India
- Education: Sir J. J. School of Art
- Occupations: Film Director, Producer founded Sagar Movietone (1929)
- Known for: Early Indian cinema

Khan Bahadur Ardeshir Irani (5 December 1886 – 14 October 1969) was a writer, director, producer, actor, film distributor, film showman and cinematographer in the silent and sound eras of early Indian cinema.

He is considered one of the greatest personalities in recent Indian Cinema. He was the director of India's first sound film Alam Ara and also the first Persian-speaking sound film, Lor Girl. He was the producer of India's first colour film Kisan Kanya. He was renowned for making films in Hindi, Telugu, English, German, Indonesian, Persian, Urdu and Tamil. He was a successful entrepreneur who owned film theatres, a gramophone agency, and a car agency.

== Life and career ==
Ardeshir Irani was born into a Parsi Zoroastrian family on 5 December 1886 in Pune, Bombay Presidency. In 1905, Irani became the Indian representative of Universal Studios and he ran Alexander Cinema in Bombay with Abdulally Esoofally for over forty years. It was at Alexandera Cinema that Ardeshir Irani learned the rules of the art of filmmaking and became fascinated by the medium. In 1917, Irani entered the field of film production and produced his first silent feature film, Nala Damayanti, which was released in 1920.

In 1922, Irani joined Bhogilal Dave, the former manager of Dadasaheb Phalke's Hindustan Films, and established Star Films. Their first silent feature film, Veer Abhimanyu was released in 1922 and starred Fatma Begum in the female lead. Dave, a graduate of the New York School of Photography, shot the films while Irani directed and produced them. Star Films produced seventeen films before Irani and Dave dissolved the partnership.

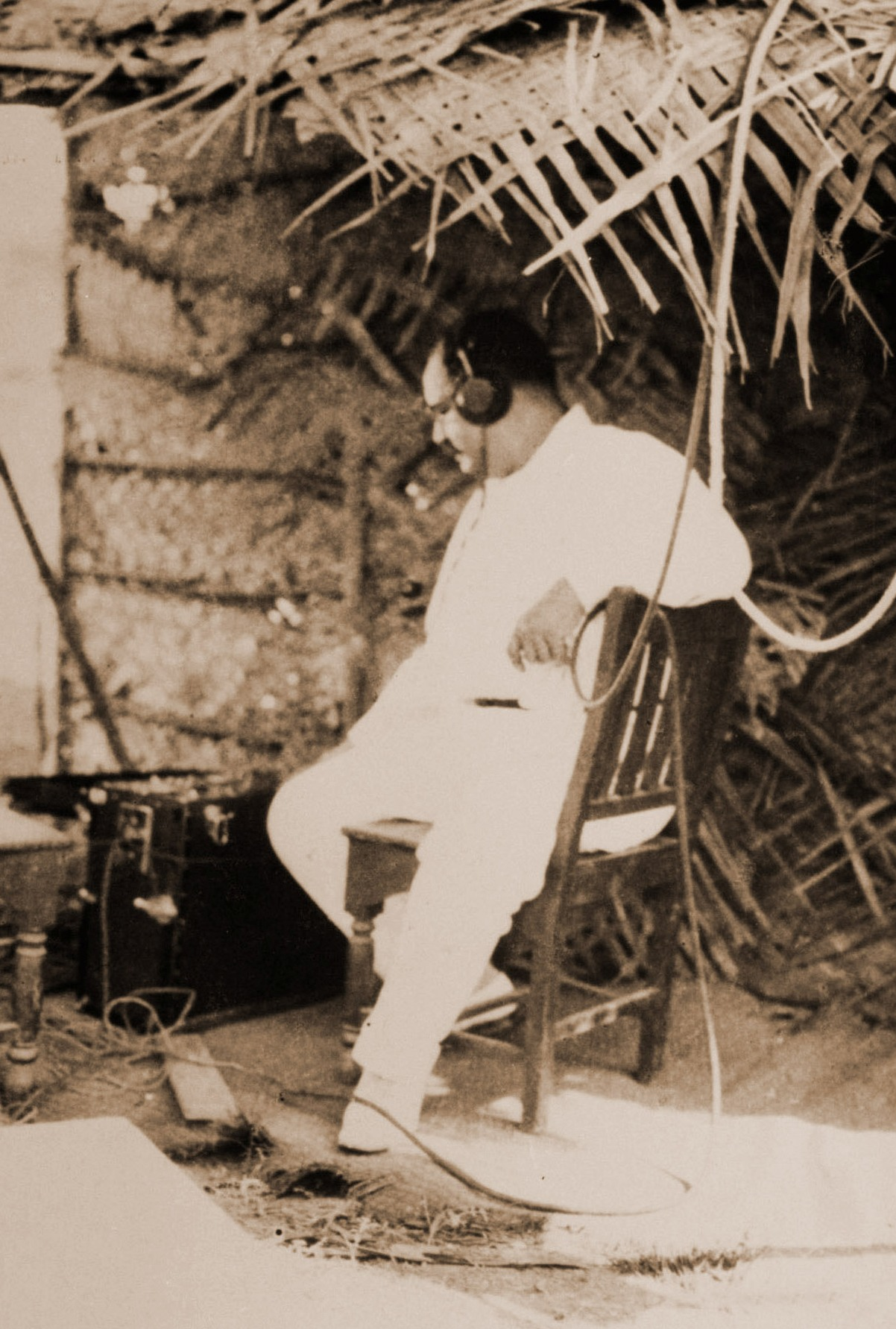
Ardeshir Irani on the sets of Alam Ara. February 1931

In 1924, Irani founded Majestic Film Company, joined by two talented youngsters, B.P. Mishra and Naval Gandhi. At this establishment, Irani produced the films and either Mishra or Gandhi directed the films. Despite its success, fifteen films later, Majestic Films closed, giving way to the equally short-lived Royal Art Studios which had exactly the same life-span as the earlier two, however, it became famous for a certain type of romantic films. Irani improved on it, using new talent to great effect.

In 1925, Irani founded Imperial Films, where he made sixty-two films. By the age of forty, Irani was an established filmmaker of Indian cinema. Ardeshir Irani became the father of talkie films with the release of his sound feature film, Alam Ara on 14 March 1931. Many of the films he produced were later made into talkie films with the same cast and crew. He is also credited with making the first Indian English feature film, Noor Jahan (1934). He completed his hat-trick of earning fame when he made the first colour feature film of India, Kisan Kanya (1937). His contribution does not end only with giving voice to the silent cinema and colour to black-and-white films. He gave a new courageous outlook to filmmaking in India and provided such a wide range of choice for stories in films that till date, there are films being made which have a theme relating to one of the one hundred fifty-eight films made by Irani.

In 1933, Irani produced and directed the first Persian talkie, Dokhtar-e-Lor. The script was written by Abdolhossein Sepanta who also acted in the film along with members of the local Parsi community.

Irani's Imperial Films introduced a number of new actors to Indian Cinema, including Prithviraj Kapoor and Mehboob Khan. He also interfered with the medium. He produced Kalidas in Telugu and Tamil, as a bilingual talkie, on the sets of Alam Ara, with songs and major casting in Telugu. Also, Irani visited London, England for fifteen days to study sound recording and recorded the sounds of Alam Ara on the basis of this knowledge. In the process, he created a whole new trend unknowingly. In those days, outdoor shootings were shot in the sunlight with the help of reflectors. However, the outdoor undesirable sounds were disturbing him so greatly that he shot the entire sequence in the studio under heavy lights. Thus, he began the trend of shooting under artificial light.

== Death ==
Irani made one hundred fifty-eight films in a long and illustrious career of twenty-five years, between the First and Second World Wars. He made his last film, Pujari, in 1945. Irani was not compelled to live like Dadasaheb Phalke for he realised that the war was a time not suitable for the film business and therefore he suspended his film business during that time. He died on 14 October 1969 at the age of eighty-two, in Mumbai, Maharashtra.

== President ==
Ardeshir Irani was the first president of the Indian Motion Picture Producers' Association (IMPPA), from 1937 to 1939.

== Filmography ==
=== As director ===
- 1922 : Veer Abhimanyu- Silent
- 1924: Vir Durgadhar - Silent
- 1924: Paap No Fej - Silent
- 1924: Bombay Ni Sethani (Call of Satan - Silent)
- 1924: Shahjehan - Silent
- 1925: Narsingh Dakoo - Silent
- 1925: Navalsha Hirji - Silent
- 1927: Wild Cat of Bombay - Silent
- 1931: Alam Ara - First Indian Talkie
- 1933: Lor Girl - First film in Persian
- 1937: Carlos

=== As producer ===
- Anarkali (1928)
- Draupadi (1931)
- Narsih Mehta (1932)
- Shirin and Farhad (1934)
- Kisan Kanya - First Indian Colour (1937)
- Lor Girl (1933)

=== As actor ===
- Ferdowsi (1934)

== See also ==
- Sagar Movietone his studio that succeeded Inperial
- H. M. Reddy
