= Lor Girl =

Persian film

- Directed by: Ardeshir Irani
- Produced by: Imperial Film Company
- Starring: Roohangiz Saminejad; Abdolhossein Sepanta; Sohrab Puri
- Cinematography: Rostam Irani
- Release date: 1933
- Running time: 90 mins
- Countries: Iran; India
- Language: Persian

Lor Girl (Persian: دخترِ لُر, romanized: Dokhtar-e-Lor), also known as The Iran of Yesterday and the Iran of Today, was the first sound film ever to be produced in the Persian language. In 1932, it was produced by Ardeshir Irani and Abdolhossein Sepanta under the Imperial Film Company in Bombay.

The movie starred Sepanta himself along with Roohangiz Saminejad, Hadi Shirazi and Sohrab Puri. Filming took only seven months to complete, and the movie arrived in Iran in October 1933. It was released at only two major theatres, Mayak and Sepah.

At the time, Iranians went to the cinema mainly to watch European short comedies, and animated features that were of a political nature. Lor Girl, as the first Iranian film with sound, was an instantaneous success and shows were ultimately sold out.

== Plot ==
The movie is about Golnar, a young teahouse girl who was kidnapped as a child and taken to Lorestan with a clan of bandits living among the Lors. The leader of the thieves, Gholi Khan, is beginning to look at her with interest now she is a grown up woman. At the teahouse, she meets a young man called Jafar who has been sent to Lorestan by the Iranian government to deal with the problem of banditry in the area. They fall in love and plan to escape together. Gholi Khan catches on to their plans and beats up Jafar. Jafar rejects Khan's offer to join the bandits, so he is kidnapped and imprisoned. Golnar helps him escape and the couple attempt to flee.

Pursued by the bandits, Jafar and Golnar are nearly captured, but Jafar kills several bandits, including Gholi Khan himself. Fearing revenge from the remaining gang, the couple escape to India, living in Bombay to find security from the lawlessness of Iran at the time. They later return to their homeland when they learn that a new government has brought law and order back to the country.

== Political significance ==
The film is set in the period of lawlessness that engulfed the country during and after World War I, especially after the attempted Soviet Communist take-over in 1917 during the Russian Civil War. The escape of the couple to India reflected a common experience of the time, with India hosting a large expatriate Iranian community. Their return to Iran is linked to the overthrow of the Qajar dynasty, which was replaced by the modernising Pahlavi dynasty founded by Reza Shah. Sepanta explained that the film's patriotic and pro-Pahlavi stance was designed to ensure popular success with Iranians living in both Iran and India:

As it was the first Iranian sound film to be presented abroad I felt it should present a bright picture of Iran, and thus I fell more or less in line with government propaganda ... but I have to admit that the film was a great boost for the nationalistic pride of expatriate Iranians.

== First woman star ==
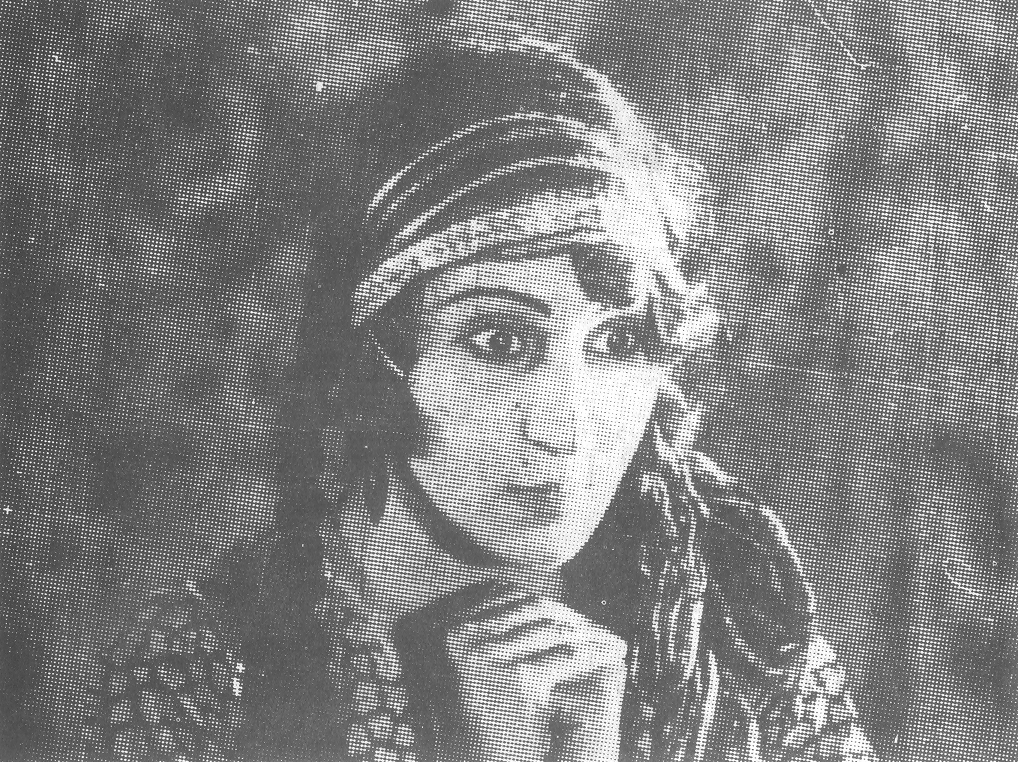
Roohangiz Saminejad as Golnar

Lor Girl is the first feature film to use a female performer as a star. It was still a taboo at the time to broadcast women in film and even radio at the time. Roohangiz Saminejad was a volunteer and wife of a studio employee at the time. Her strong Kermani accent required some changes to the script to account for it, as Kerman is a long distance from Lorestan.

The role made her an automatic star whose fame lasted for a short period and caused her problems, as she suffered sexual harassment as well as criticism for exposing herself to the public gaze. In her later years, she moved to Tehran under a changed name and died in old age in virtual anonymity.

== Remake ==
The movie was remade in the 1970s and titled Jafar-o-Golnar.

Scenes from the original film are included in the comedy fantasy Once Upon a Time, Cinema, in which the heroine of the film magically comes to life (now played by Fatemeh Motamed-Aria) in the reign of the 19th-century Shah Naser al-Din Shah, who falls in love with her.
