= Layla and Majnun (1937 film) =

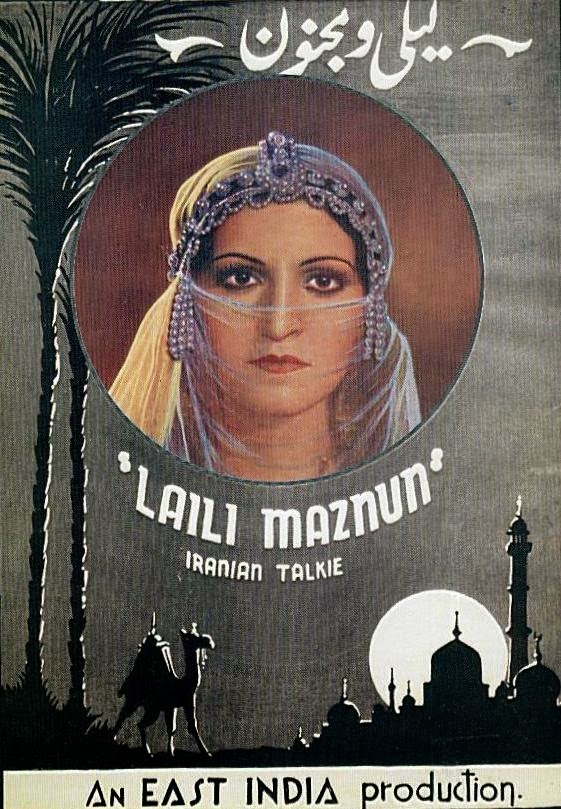
- لیلی و مجنون
- Directed by: Abdolhossein Sepenta
- Written by: Abdolhossein Sepenta
- Starring: Haji Abed; Manouchehr Arian; Abed Basravi
- Cinematography: Probat Das
- Music by: Ali-Naqi Vaziri
- Distributed by: East India Films
- Release date: 22 March 1937
- Running time: 145 minutes
- Countries: Iran; India
- Language: Persian

Layla and Majnun (Persian: لیلی و مجنون, romanized: Leyli va Majnun), also spelled as Leili-o-Majnun or Laili-o-Majnoon, is a 1937 Iranian romance film produced in 1937 by Abdolhossein Sepanta by the East India Film Studios.

== History ==
The film was based on the dramatic poem by Nizami (c. 1192), and was Sepanta's fifth produced film that had sound. The complete script for Laila and Majnun is available, as are Sepanta's other manuscripts. The script contain detailed information regarding exterior and interior scenes, dialogues, and actors' movements, settings, costumes, lighting, sound effects and camera movements. The explanatory notes on editing and film processing are offered and scene descriptions are mostly accompanied by carefully worked-out drawings. This film was produced in conjunction with the Iranian diaspora community of Calcutta, which included notables Abed Basravi of the Basravi Masjid, which was a cultural centre for the community at the British Indian capital.

Sepanta commented on the failure of this final film: "In September 1936, I arrived in Bushehr with a print of Laila and Majnun. Due to bu-reaucratic complications, the film print could not be immediately released, and we had to leave for Tehran without it. Government officials’ attitude was inexplicably hostile from the beginning and I almost was sorry that I returned home. The authorities did not value cinema as an art form or even as a means of mass communication, and I soon realized that I had to forget about my dream of establishing a film studio. I even had difficulty getting permission to screen my film, and in the end the machinations of the movie theater owners forced us to turn over the film to them almost for nothing".
