= Abdolhossein Sepanta =

Iranian film director

- عبدالحسین سپنتا
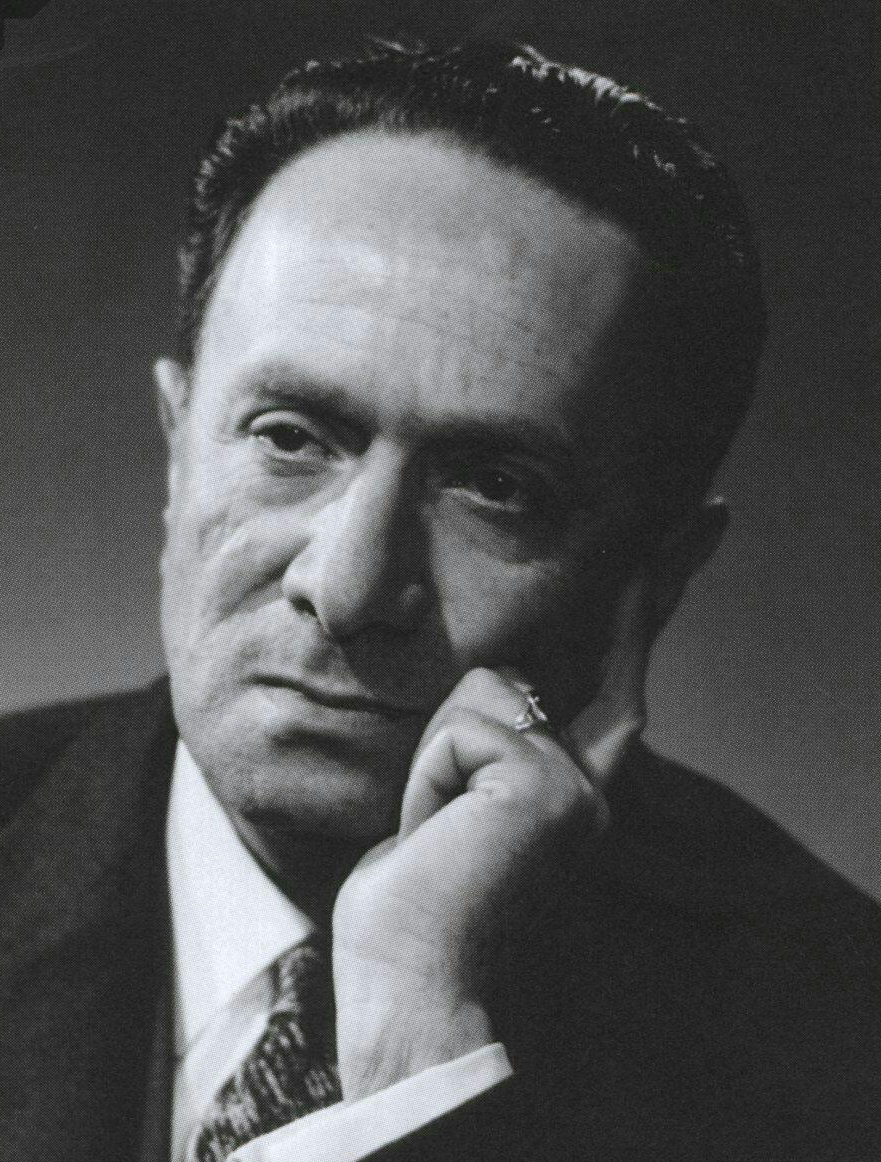
- Born: 4 June 1907; Tehran, Persia
- Died: 28 March 1969 (aged 61); Isfahan, Iran
- Resting place: Takht-e Foulad
- Occupations: Film director, producer
- Years active: 1929–1933

Abdolhossein Sepanta (Persian: عبدالحسین سپنتا, 4 June 1907 – 28 March 1969) was an Iranian film director and producer. He made the earliest sound films in the Persian language. He was also a writer and journalist and promoter of liberal politics.

== Biography ==
=== Early years ===
Abdolhossein Sepanta was born in the Vagonkhaneh Avenue area in Tehran in 1907. His father, Gholam Reza Khan was the translator for Mozzafar-al-Din Shah, a King of the Qajar dynasty.

Abdolhossein began his studies at the Saint Louis and Zoroastrian Colleges in Tehran circa 1925. He found a keen interest in ancient Persian history and literature. Therefore, in 1927, he chose Sepanta as his surname. In 1927, he traveled to India via Bushehr. There, he became acquainted with Dinshah Irani, his Indian translator, who was the director of the Persian Zoroastrian Society. After extensive studies in ancient culture, he returned to Iran for a short period.

Sepanta soon returned to India again with plans for a lengthier stay. He continued to study ancient Iranian culture and literature. Encouraged by his teachers and professors, Sepanta started his activity in cinema.

=== Lor Girl ===
As Sepanta took more interest in film, he found that there was a possibility one of his productions could make it to theaters in Iran through some competitive tactics. The leading Iranian films producer at the time was Oganes Oganians, a Russian Armenian immigrant who pioneered the industry in Iran. His silent films were a hit in Iran and were modeled after a series of Danish comedies aired in the previous years.

Looking at the advanced technology available in British India, Sepanta realized that he could bring to Iranian cinema the first talkie film. In 1931, with an acquaintance Ardeshir Irani, a parsi from the local community, Sepanta began production of the Lor Girl at the Imperial Film Co. in Bombay. The movie was the first film with people talking in it as well as one of the first productions in a Muslim country to feature a female. The movie was screened in October 1933 in Tehran at two major movie theaters, Mayak Cinema and Sepah Cinema, and was surprisingly a major hit. Contrary to the expectations of cinema managers, who relied on foreign films, The Lor Girl was an instant success and set a new record for sales and running period which was not surpassed for several years.

Sepanta wrote the entire script and played the leading male role as well. The story is about Golnar, a village teahouse maid that falls in love with Jafar, a government agent. The two fall in love and escape to India until political tensions in troubled Iran die down. The movie is said to be a subtle political commentary on the lack of general public security during a period when the Pahlavi dynasty is replacing the Qajar dynasty in Iran.

=== The leader of early Iranian cinema ===
In the 1930s, there were nine talkie films produced from 1931 to 1937. Of these nine, five are Sepanta's films. He's considered by many to be the Leader of that era, when films were mainly political documentaries and films for entertainment were disliked by the ruling dynasty.

He was the director, screenwriter, and oftentimes, the lead actor in his films. These were The Lor Girl (1931), Ferdowsi, Shirin-o-Farhaad, Black Eyes, and Leyli o Majnun (1936 film), which were produced in India.

Sepanta was a man of letters and a prominent scholar in pre-Islamic Persian literature, therefore his films were highly nationalistic and historical, a trend which prevailed in other artistic and literary circles at the time and was the outcome of the suppressed but restless social and cultural situation in the society.

Concerning his motives in making A Lor Girl, Sepanta explains later:

"As it was the first Iranian sound film to be presented abroad I felt it should present a bright picture of Iran... I have to admit that the film was a great boost for the nationalistic pride of expatriate Iranians."

Until 1933, The Lor Girl Iran's cinema was not so popular and the few cinemas in Tehran and other major cities just served the aristocracy and some particular classes of the society. Moreover, Iranian filmmakers had no clear line of thought. With the exception of Sepanta, who used the elements of Iran's ancient literature in his works, other filmmakers would mostly imitate foreign movies.

Sepanta's superior films raised the expectations of Iranian movie audiences. In 1934, he made his second film Ferdowsi at the millenary celebrations of the great Persian epic poet Ferdowsi.

Sepanta's third film. Shirin-o-Farhaad. was based on a romantic story from Nizami dramatic poetry. The film was shot in India in four months and was screened towards the end of 1934. Sepanta directed his fourth film, The Black Eyes, and screened it in Tehran for four weeks. In 1936, Sepanta made his final commercial film, Laili-o-Majnoon.

Between 1930 and 1936 the Iranian film industry was shut down, and Sepanta continued his activities alone, and produced his films and kept the market live and busy.

After Laili-o-Majnoon, Sepanta prepared for shooting another script with the working title of The Black Owl. However, the project never materialized, nor did another screenplay he had written on the life of Persian mathematician, astronomer and poet Omar Khayyám.

=== Conservatism and the Calcutta Iranians ===
Sepanta's early films were filmed in Bombay with Parsis as organizers and cast of different backgrounds. For some reason, in 1935, Sepanta packed his things and left Bombay for Calcutta to seek out opportunities in the Bengali cinema.

This final film, Laili-o-Majnoon, was based on a full-scale dramatic poem by Nizami similar to that of Romeo and Juliet. The Basravi family made many peripherals that added to the script such as detailed information regarding exterior and interior scenes, dialogues, and actors' movements, settings, costumes, lighting, sound effects and camera movements. They also contributed in making explanatory notes on editing and film processing made that are offered and scene descriptions by carefully worked-out drawings. Though the other 4 scripts are available, none of them show such detailed workmanship. Due to the changing political climate in Iran, Laili-o-Majnoon never saw any comparable market success.

=== Return to Iran ===
In 1935, he left Calcutta (Kolkata) for home, hoping that he could enlist government assistance to establish a film production studio in Iran. However, he failed to gain enough support for his projects from the new government.

Dr. Sassan Sepanta quoted his father in an interview:

"In September 1936, he arrived in Bushehr (a port beside of Persian Gulf) with a print of Laili-o-Majnoon. Due to bureaucratic complications, the film print could not be immediately released to screen, and he had to leave for Tehran without it. Government officials' attitude was inexplicably hostile from the beginning and he almost was sorry that he returned home. The authorities did not value cinema as an art form or even as a means of mass communication, and he soon realized that he had to forget about his dream of establishing a film studio in Iran. He even had difficulty getting permission to screen his film, and in the end the movie theater owners forced him to turn over the film to them almost for nothing."

Sepanta who had been disappointed, sold his Laili-o-Majnoon at a very cheap price to cinema owners in Tehran, he was about to return to India for the last time to shoot The Black Owl and Omar Khayyám, when he was retained in Esfahan by his mother's illness. He never returned to India.

=== Sepanta after filmmaking ===
Between 1934 and 1954, not a single film was produced in Iran and when filmmaking activity was resumed, Sepanta was living in seclusion in Esfahan.

In 1943 he started publishing his weekly magazine(Sepanta Newspaper). He had difficulty to continuing publishing his magazine because of his ideology and political thought, which holds liberty as the primary political value and seeking a society characterized by freedom of thought on the authority of government. Therefore, he has been forced to close his magazine in 1954. From 1955 he was the Iranian consultant of the United States Aid Program in Esfahan.

Finally after 30 years, Sepanta took up filmmaking again, though not professionally. He bought an 8 mm Canon camera and made a number of short documentary films between 1967 and 1969. The Autumn, one of his 8 mm films, was presented 2 years after his death at the 26th session of the Free Cinema Workshop in 1971 in Iran.

Throughout his life he wrote and translated eighteen books including:

- Ethical philosophy of the Ancient Iran,
- Who was Zoroaster and what He did,
- The elementary Mazdyasna, Rays of Philosophy in Ancient Iran,
- Selected Poems from Dehqan Samani and Mirza Abolvahab Golshan Iranpour,
- The collected poems of Sepanta, and The poems of the Pahlavi Period.

Abdolhussein Sepanta has played a fundamental role in the formation and growth of the Iranian movies, who has been known as the father of Iranian sound films in Iran.

Sepanta died in Esfahan of a heart attack on 28 March 1969.

== Filmography ==
- 1933 – Lor Girl
- 1934 – Ferdowsi
- 1934 – Shirin and Farhad
- 1936 – Black Eyes
- 1937 – Layla and Majnun (Persian: لیلی و مجنون, romanized: Leyli va Majnun)
