= Mahdi Pakdel =

Iranian actor (born 1980)

Mehdi Pakdel
- مهدی پاکدل
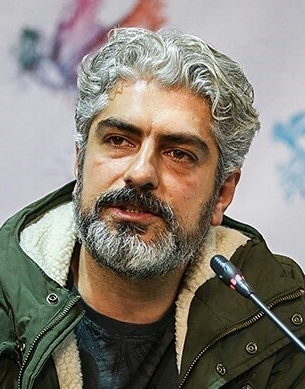
- Pakdel at the 2018 Fajr Film Festival
- Born: 1 July 1980 (age 46); Isfahan, Iran
- Occupation: Actor
- Years active: 1993–present
- Spouses: Behnoosh Tabatabaei (m. 2011; div. 2016) Rana Azadivar (m. 2020)
- Relatives: Masoud (brother); Hossein (brother)

Mehdi Pakdel (Persian: مهدی پاکدل; born July 1, 1980) is an Iranian actor.

== Career ==
Mehdi Pakdel lived in his hometown until the age of 17 when he left for the capital, Tehran, to pursue a career in arts.

While studying graphic arts at the Islamic Azad University, he designed a few theatrical posters and later established his own graphic studio to broaden his field of work.

His first stage appearance was in 1997, after which he began to pursue an acting career.

While his main focus has been on stage acting, he had several cinematic and television roles which gained him nationwide fame.

Pakdel has appeared in the series ‘The Scarlet Pearl’ (2004), ‘The Silence of the Sea’ (2005), ‘The First Night of Peace’ (2005), ‘The Innocent Ones’ (2008), ‘The Night Shall Pass’ (2008), ‘Missing’ (2010), ‘Setayesh’ (2009-2010), and ‘Kimiya’ (2013-2015), ‘The Accomplice’ (2020), ‘Jeyran’ (2022)

He has also acted in a number of movies, including ‘Blue’ (2000), ‘Fish Fall in Love’ (2004), ‘Hardships of the Maiden’ (2006), ‘Trouble’ (2007), ‘Tambourine’ (2007), ‘The Snitch’ (2008), ‘Without Permission’ (2010), ‘The Freeway’ (2010), ‘A Decent Ceremony’ (2011), and ‘Muhammad: The Messenger of God’ (2014).

== Personal life ==
Pakdel was initially married to actress Behnoosh Tabatabaei. They met in March 2007, and got married in 2011. They divorced in 2016. In 2020, reports of his marriage to Rana Azadivar surfaced in the media.

== Filmography ==
=== Film ===
Year	Title	Role	Director	Notes
2000	The Blue	Yashar	Hamid Labkhandeh	
2004	Internet Adventures		Hossein Ghenaat	
2005	The Fish Fall in Love	Reza	Ali Rafie	
2006	Calamities of the Maiden		Masoud Atyabi	
2006	Nightly		Omid Bonakdar, Keyvan Alimohammadi	
2008	Predicament	Reza Shemirani	Mohammad Ali Sadjadi	
2008	Tambourine		Parisa Bakhtavar	
2012	The Freeway	Salman	Abbas Rafei	
2012	Without Permission	Amir	Morteza Ahmadi Harandi	
2013	Tomorrow		Mehdi Pakdel, Iman Afsharian	Director & Screenwriter
2014	Raspberry		Saman Salur	
2015	Muhammad: The Messenger of God	Abu Talib	Majid Majidi	
2016	Sometimes	Mani	Mohamad Reza Rahmani	
2016	Dead End of Trust		Hamid Kaviani	
2017	Midday Adventures	Masoud Keshmiri	Mohammad Hossein Mahdavian	
2017	House of Paper	Taha	Mehdi Sabbaghzadeh	
2018	Istanbul Junction	Fariborz	Mostafa Kiaei	
2018	The Lost Strait	Reza	Bahram Tavakoli	
2020	Infatuate Narcissus	Reza / Aref Ghazvini	Seyyed Jalalaldin Dori	
2021	Tara		Kaveh Ghahreman	
2021	At the End of Evin		Mehdi Torab Beigi, Mohammad Torab Beigi	

=== Web ===
Year	Title	Role	Director	Platform
2020	The Accomplice	Farhad Sabouri	Mostafa Kiaei	Filimo, Namava
2022–2023	Jeyran	Salman	Hassan Fathi	Filimo
2023	Amsterdam	Barbod	Masoud Gharagozlu	Tamashakhaneh
