= Muhammad: The Messenger of God (film) =

2015 Islamic epic mythological Iranian film directed by Majid Majidi

- Directed by: Majid Majidi
- Written by: Majid Majidi; Hamid Amjad; Kambuzia Partovi
- Based on: Muhammad
- Produced by: Muhammad Mehdi Heidarian; Mohammadreza Saberi; Majid Majidi
- Starring: Mahdi Pakdel; Alireza Shoja Nouri; Mohsen Tanabandeh; Sareh Bayat; Mina Sadati; Rana Azadivar
- Cinematography: Vittorio Storaro
- Edited by: Roberto Perpignani
- Music by: A. R. Rahman
- Production companies: Noor-e-Taban Film Company Production; Infinite Production Company GmbH
- Release date: August 27, 2015 (Iran)
- Running time: 178 minutes
- Country: Iran
- Languages: Persian; Aramaic; Arabic
- Budget: $40 million
- Box office: $1.4 million

Muhammad: The Messenger of God (Persian: محمد رسول‌الله, romanized: Mohammad Rasulollah) is a 2015 Iranian Islamic epic film directed by Majid Majidi and co-written with Kambuzia Partovi. Set in the sixth century, the plot revolves around the childhood of the Islamic prophet Muhammad, whose face is obscured and never shown onscreen.

The film marks the highest-budget production in Iranian cinema to date. Development of Muhammad: The Messenger of God began in 2007 and Majidi wrote the first draft of the screenplay by 2009. By 2011, a colossal set created in the city of Qom near Tehran was ready for the majority of the film. Throughout the filming process, Majidi worked with a team of historians and archaeologists for the work on accuracy of the early life of Muhammad. Post-production works began in Munich during late 2013 and were completed in 2014. The cinematography is done by Vittorio Storaro and film score is composed by A. R. Rahman.

The film was set to have its premiere at the Fajr International Film Festival on 1 February 2015 but was pulled due to technical difficulties. For the critics, filmmakers and journalists, a special screening was held at Cinema Farhang in Iran on 12 February 2015. It was released both in Iran and at Montreal World Film Festival on 27 August 2015. The film was selected as the Iranian entry for the Best Foreign Language Film at the 88th Academy Awards.

== Plot ==
By the order of Abraha, King of Habasha, one of his army commanders launches an attack on Mecca in order to destroy the Kaaba. He leads a well-equipped force of thousands of soldiers, horses and elephants. As the army approaches Mecca, the elephants respond to divine order by halting and refusing to continue. Millions of small birds then release a hail of stones onto Abraha's forces and the army is annihilated. A month later, Muhammad is born. The film depicts pre-Islamic Arabia as seen through the eyes of Muhammad from birth to the age of 13.

In the beginning of the film, a message appears that states the film encompasses historical facts as well as free personal impressions about Muhammad. Accordingly, some of the film's events did not actually take place in real life, but are indeed similar to events in Muhammad's biography. Majidi stated that the objective behind presenting these scenes is to show that the whole existence could feel Muhammad's presence as well as his mercy.

The story ends with Muhammad's journey to Syria and encounter with Bahira.

Addressing the associated controversies, Majidi said, "The film contains no controversies and no differences between the Shia and the Sunni points of view."

== Cast ==
- Mahdi Pakdel as Abu Talib
- Alireza Shoja Nouri as Abdul Muttalib
- Mohsen Tanabandeh as Samuel
- Sareh Bayat as Halimah
- Mina Sadati as Aminah
- Dariush Farhang as Abu Sufyan
- Alireza Jalili as child Muhammad (without showing face)
- Rana Azadivar as Umm Jamil
- Hedayat Hashemi as Hanateh
- Sadegh Hatefi as Bahira
- Negar Abedi as Hanateh's wife
- Hamidreza Tajdolat as Hamza
- Mohammad Asgari as Abū Lahab
- Mohammad Yaromtaghloo as Abū Jahl
- Pantea Mehdinia as Fatimah
- Jafar Ghasemi as Harith
- Arash Falahat Pisheh as Abraha
- Ali Asghar Khatibzadeh as Benjamin
- Nasrin Nosrati as Berkah
- Rastin Soleimani as Abdul khaligh

== Production ==
Majid Majidi's film The Willow Tree was about to have its premiere at the 17th NatFilm Festival. However, the director backed out the screening of the film citing the controversy created by the Jyllands-Posten over cartoon depiction of Islamic prophet Muhammad. According to Majidi, the publishing insulted the population of Muslim people and disrespected the boundaries of the holy sanctuaries of beliefs. This led him to the idea of making a film on Muhammad. Later, to make a more practical response to the insulting act of the newspaper, he took up the subject of prophet of Islam.

I thought to myself how can they hold an honoring ceremony for me in a country where my beliefs and sanctities are insulted... So, in a letter I said I could not attend the ceremony (in a country) where my holiest sanctities are desecrated. Instead of showing reaction to the insults to Islamic sanctities, it is better to do some action to introduce the Islamic culture and that is why production of the movie 'Muhammad (PBUH)' was started 7 years ago.

— Majid Majidi on tracing the instinct to begin the project Muhammad: The Messenger of God.

=== Development ===
Pre-production began in October 2007 with the first screenplay draft ready by March 2009. In early 2011, an enormous set of an estimated 100 hectares (250 acres) was built near the city of Qom. The set resembled sixth-century Mecca and Medina during the early years of the life of Muhammad. A replica of the Kaaba shrine was built in the remote village of Mazraeh-ye Allahyar. In October 2011, Majidi officially announced the project, calling it his 'most ambitious and expensive film project'. He did not hint at the title of the project or its content but added that it would 'bring pride to Iran and Iranians'.

By the following month, filming had commenced and the minister of culture and Islamic guidance Mohammad Hosseini confirmed that a movie about Muhammad was being filmed. The film was partially funded by the Iranian government. Mohammad Mehdi Heidarian was announced as the producer, and Shining Light (Noor-e-Taban) was the project's financial backer. However, in a turn of events, reports of November 2012 claimed the film was titled Muhammad's Childhood. Majidi opined that many Muslims know little about Muhammad's upbringing. His objective was to orientate the audience with the period of Jahiliyyah (pre-Islamic era), and how it was before the appearance of Muhammad. Majidi framed the screenplay to depict the Quraysh tribe and how Muhammad was raised against this backdrop yet developed very firm principles from an early age.

The cinematographer, Vittorio Storaro, arrived in Iran with a 30-man crew. Storato accepted the project after he had a brief discussion about the film with Majidi in Rome. Scott E. Anderson was involved as a visual effects supervisor. Croatian production designer Miljen Kreka Kljakovic was named as the art director, and Giannetto De Rossi as the make-up artist. Costume designers from Germany, Croatia and Slovenia were chosen in August 2013.

According to Majidi, he and a research team of historians and archaeologists had consulted with Shia and Sunni scholars from Iran, Algeria, Morocco, Lebanon and Iraq in order to ensure accurate portrayal of Muhammad's early years. Majidi also consulted jurists and clerics to explain his vision and the impressions that he wanted to communicate through this film. He met and discussed the film with Ayatollah Ali Khamenei who supported and viewed the final movie. Ali Al-Sistani, Ayatollah Wahid Khorasani, and Iranian philosopher Ayatollah Javadi Amoli were also involved. Majidi's research team sought the advice of Sunni Ulama, among whom was the Turkish Hayrettin Karaman. While speaking at a press conference, for the creation of a logotype representing Muhammad, Majidi stated that the film intended to fight against any improper image of Islam the West had in mind. The logotype was designed by calligrapher Mohammad Jalil Rasouli. Mohammed Mahdi Heidarian, head of the Noor-e-Taban Film Industry Company Production, confirmed that his firm had spent $40 million on the epic film.

=== Filming ===
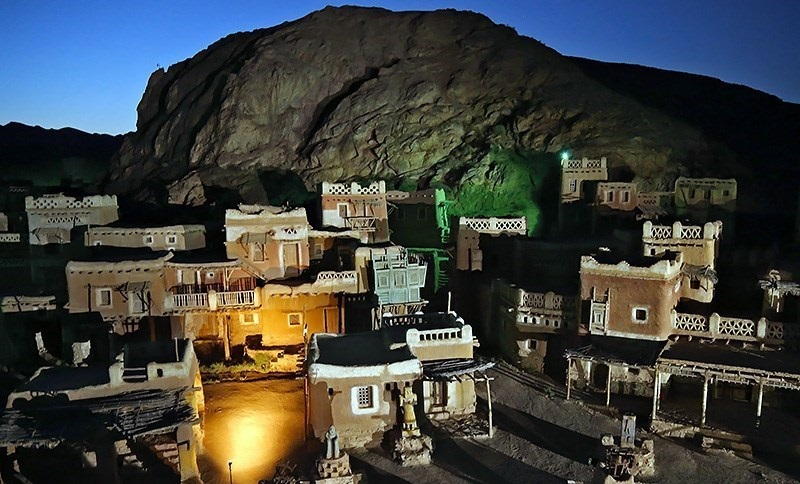
The self-constructed city near Qom, Iran where majority of filming took place.

The majority of filming was done in secrecy and without any news coverage, allowing no journalists to visit or report from filming locations. Further, Majidi talked less to his actors face to face, and mostly they needed to talk to his assistants. In an interview with Mumbai Mirror, Majidi stated that for filming on a grand scale he faced many problems of administration and logistics. As 40% of the story takes place in 6th century Mecca, Majidi and his team recreated the city to what it would have been 1400 years ago. Filming was done at a set constructed near the city Qom, Iran. Later, the location of the set was named as "Prophet Muhammad Cinematic City" due to its grandiosity in structure and area. Certain scenes requiring elephants were filmed at Bela-Bela in South Africa. Despite having meagre sources, no paintings from that period to assist in the process; the team tried to make the location as historically accurate as possible. Besides this, in other locations they had problems with constructions, with providing costumes and animals, transporting elephants and handling the huge number of people on the shoot, as some days the team had nearly 3000 extras present on the site.

In an interview with Iranian Film Daily, Majidi was quoted, "A whole town as well as a full-scale Mecca were recreated down to the most minute detail." The film script depicts Muhammad's adventures through the age of twelve. Majidi added that the film starts with Muhammad's adolescence, and his childhood is shown through flashbacks. The makers chose the period before Muhammad became a prophet. Considering difficulties and Islamic beliefs on the countenance of Muhammad, Majidi stated, "The face of Muhammad is not shown in the film. By hiding his face I will make the character more intriguing for the viewer." Cinematographer Storato compensated the facial look by focusing on other tools of expression like camera movement with use of lighting. Further, another Steadicam that focuses on Muhammad's perspective was used other than few cameras for the rest of the cast. The film's frame rate was increased from 24 cadres per second to 30 cadres per second for the movement to be more smooth.

=== Music ===
The film score is composed by A. R. Rahman. It took six months for Rahman to understand the kind of score that Majidi wanted. He worked on the score for a year and a half. The soundtrack was released by Sony DADC on 23 December 2015.

=== Post-production ===
Post-production began in Munich by October 2013. In 2014, Majidi revealed that the film would be ready by end of 2014 and would be submitted to the Fajr International Film Festival in Iran. By mid-2014, the film was in the final stages of post. In January 2015, work on special effects and music composition were being carried out. In February 2015, Majidi was in France to resolve issues pertaining to sound-mix engineering.

== Release ==
In November 2014, Majidi was appointed as the president of the jury of 33rd Fajr International Film Festival in Iran. Moreover, the film is set to have its world premiere through the same. However, objections were raised on the film's release due to inclusion of a jury member and his film. In a press conference, a spokesman for the Ministry of Culture and Islamic Guidance, Hossein Nooshabadi answered, "I think the films produced about the life of Muhammad by other filmmakers so far, have a lot of flaws and faults and for the first time in Iranian cinema, such an exemplary work in the Muslim world has been produced by Majid Majidi as a Muslim and professional filmmaker." The film was set to premiere at the opening of 33rd Fajr Film Festival on 1 February 2015. However, the screening was cancelled, citing technical difficulties with the audio of the film. Majidi clarified that the existing theater's sound environment at Milad Tower in Tehran was incompatible with the film's mix.

On 12 February 2015, the film was screened for filmmakers, journalists and critics at Farhang Theater Hall in Tehran. The film released at an estimated 143 theaters in Iran and premiere at Montreal World Film Festival on 27 August 2015. Owing to positive response to premiere, an additional screening was held at Cinema Imperial in Montreal on 7 September 2015. The film was screened at Hamadan Film Festival on 29 September 2015.

On 5 November 2015, the film was screened in Grand Galaxy Cinema in Beirut, Lebanon. On 18 November 2015, the film was screened at the 23rd Camerimage International Film Festival in Bydgoszcz. Majid Majidi and Vittorio Storaro were honored with "Outstanding Cinematic Duo Award". On 16 January 2016, the film was screened in Masrah al—Watani in Baghdad.

== Reception ==
=== Critical response ===
Mostafa Seyedabadi states that the colour and lighting in the film was "astonishing". Critic Massoud Farasati dismissed certain film's shots, like a low-angle view of Muhammad as a teen against the sky, and called it a "Hollywood" knockoff. In a first look review published by The Guardian, the critic gave the film 4 out of 5 stars, stating, "Majidi chronicles the first ripples of this revolutionary wave in a handsome, pre-CGI-era epic style. His film is intellectually honest, committed and poetic." Contrary to the positive review, Alissa Simon of Variety stated, "Although many of Majidi's earlier films dealt with the spiritual purity that comes with selfless love and deliver a religious rapture of sorts, "Muhammad: The Messenger of God" feels stiff and awkward, burdened rather than elevated by its weighty subject matter. And it doesn't help that the characters remain cardboard cutouts of historical figures, never attaining any psychological or emotional life." Sheri Linden of The Hollywood Reporter opined that the film was 'moving' in moments, but mainly overdone and underwhelming. Reza Abbas Farishta of The Muslim Vibe magazine rated the film 93%, stated: "My last thoughts are directed towards Majid Majidi and his team who dedicated 7 years of their life for this herculean task, and have blessed us with this beautiful masterpiece."

In her analysis, Pak-Shiraz (2024) describes Muhammad: The Messenger of God as a significant contribution to cinematic representations of Muhammad. Endorsed by Iran's supreme leader, the film's scope extends beyond typical cinematic boundaries, aiming to assert religious legitimacy and superiority in preserving Islamic heritage. The production involved the extensive creation of the Cinematic City of Nur, emphasizing the film's cultural and historical ambitions. According to Pak-Shiraz, the film seeks to counter both Western misrepresentations and extremist interpretations of Islamic narratives. Through its portrayal, it balances the medium's need for dramatization with religious and historical authenticity. Set 1,400 years ago, the film underscores Muhammad's relevance across time, positioning him as a link between past and present religious traditions, including Judaism and Christianity, and as a figure whose story resonates with contemporary challenges in Iran.

=== Box office ===
The film raked in an estimated $60,000 on the opening day in Tehran. Further, in two weeks post the release, it grossed roughly $2 million. It was the top-grossing movie of that year with a total of over $1.8 million.

=== Awards and nominations ===
Year	Award	Category	Recipient	Result
2015	Camerimage International Film Festival	Outstanding Cinematic Duo Award	Vittorio Storaro & Majid Majidi	Won
2016	Asia Pacific Screen Awards	Achievement in Cinematography	Vittorio Storaro	Nominated
2016	Asia Pacific Screen Awards	Best Film	Mohammadreza Saberi & Majid Majidi	Nominated

=== Objections ===
The film met with widespread criticism prior to its theatrical release, originating from Sunni Arab countries. In February 2015, Egypt's Al-Azhar University called on Iran to ban the film. According to the university, which described the film as debasing the sanctity of messengers from God. Saudi Arabia's Grand Mufti, Abdul-Aziz ibn Abdullah Al Shaykh condemned the film, stating that "the film depicts the Muhammad in an 'untrue light'" and "undermines the important role he plays in Islam. The film stands a mockery of Muhammad and a degradation of his status." The Saudi Muslim World League (MWL) also denounced the movie on account of scenes characterizing the body and figure of Muhammad. In India, Barelvi Raza Academy issued a fatwa against the director, Majid Majidi, as well as A. R. Rahman, who wrote the musical score for the film. The Raza Academy also demanded a ban on the film, successfully petitioning the Maharashtra government to block its online release in 2020 on the Don Cinema streaming service with the home minister of Maharashtra Anil Deshmukh also asking the government of India for a nationwide ban.

== Sequel ==
The producers have planned two sequels that would complete the intended trilogy. The first would focus on Muhammad's life from his teenage years to his 40s, with the third and final installment to depict life after his 40s until when he ultimately becomes the prophet of Islam. As of 2024, nothing has surfaced.

== See also ==
- List of Islamic films
- Muhammad in film
- List of submissions to the 88th Academy Awards for Best Foreign Language Film
- List of Iranian submissions for the Academy Award for Best Foreign Language Film
- Muhammad in Islam
- Muhammad: The Last Prophet
