= Mohsen Tanabandeh =

Iranian actor (born 1975)

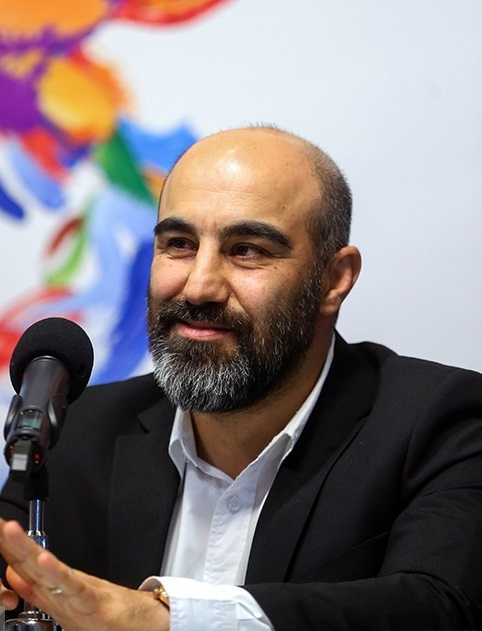
- Tanabandeh at the 2019 Fajr Film Festival
- Born: April 15, 1975 (age 51); Damghan, Iran
- Occupations: Actor; director; screenwriter
- Years active: 1996–present
- Spouse: Roshanak Golba (2021–present)
- Children: 2

Mohsen Tanabandeh (Persian: محسن تنابنده; born April 15, 1975) is an Iranian actor, screenwriter, and director. He is best known for his role as Naghi Mamooli in the television series Capital (2011–2025), for which he also served as creator and head writer, earning three Hafez Awards.

== Early life ==
Mohsen Tanabandeh was born on 15 April 1975 in Tehran, Iran, though his father hails from Damghan. He has mentioned that his aunt is from Behshahr, Mazandaran Province, and he is fluent in the Mazanderani language. The second of seven siblings, with three brothers and three sisters, Tanabandeh grew up in a family that moved to Tehran and later Eslamshahr due to his father’s job. He completed his primary, middle, and high school education in Eslamshahr. A graduate in acting, Tanabandeh began his professional acting career in theater in 1995, performing in plays such as Bar-e Am and Jaryan-e Asabi, both written and directed by Hassan Varasteh.

== Career ==
Tanabandeh initially worked in theater before transitioning to film. In 2003, he debuted in cinema with a role in Tiny Snowflakes, directed by Alireza Amini. He gained recognition for his performance and screenplay in A Martyrdom for God (2005), winning the Fajr Film Festival’s Crystal Simorgh for Best Supporting Actor and receiving a nomination for Best Screenplay. He later won the Crystal Simorgh for Best Actor for his roles in Seven Minutes Until Autumn (2009) and Ferrari (2017) and earned an Honorary Diploma for Indigences (2010) at the Fajr Film Festival.

Tanabandeh’s portrayal of Naghi Mamooli in Capital (2011–2025) became iconic, earning him widespread acclaim and three Hafez Awards for acting and screenwriting. He also played multiple roles with distinct makeup in the series Shahgoosh and portrayed an elderly woman in Fool. In Majid Majidi’s Muhammad: The Messenger of God (2015), he played Samuel, a Jewish character, delivering most of his dialogue in Hebrew.

In 2021, Tanabandeh appeared in the critically acclaimed drama A Hero. The following year, he won the Best Actor award in the Horizons section of the 79th Venice International Film Festival for his performance in World War III.

As a director, Tanabandeh debuted with the film Ginness (2015) and later directed Oath (2019). Beyond acting, he has worked extensively as a screenwriter and acting coach.

== Personal life ==
On 30 January 2026, Tanabandeh revealed that his cousin's son, Amirhossein Mohammadzadeh, who played for a youth football team, was killed in the 2025–2026 Iranian protests. Tanabandeh openly criticized the government saying: "I wish you had planned for his future as much as you have laws to punish young Iranians."

== Filmography ==
=== Film ===
Year	Title	Role	Actor	Screenwriter	Director
2003	Tiny Snowflakes	Mine Guard	Yes	No	Alireza Amini
2005	How Much You Want to Cry?		No	Yes	Shahed Ahmadlo
2005	A Few Kilos of Dates For A Funeral	Sadri	Yes	No	Saman Salur
2006	Offside	Ticket Seller	Yes	No	Jafar Panahi
2007	Catch Me If You Can		No	Yes	Shahed Ahmadlo
2008	A Time to Love	Amiri	Yes	No	Ebrahim Forouzesh
2008	A Petition for God	Ali Mohammad	Yes	Yes	Alireza Amini
2010	Seven Minutes Until Autumn	Nima	Yes	Yes	Alireza Amini
2010	First Stone	Hassan Ali	Yes	No	Ebrahim Forouzesh
2010	Saint Petersburg	Karim	Yes	No	Behrouz Afkhami
2011	Indigences	Mahmoud	Yes	No	Mohammad Reza Arab
2014	Lamp 100	Farzin	Yes	No	Saeed Aghakhani
2015	Iran Burger	Fathollah Khan	Yes	No	Masoud Jafari Jozani
2015	Guinness	Bek	Yes	Yes	Mohsen Tanabandeh
2015	Muhammad: The Messenger of God	Samuel	Yes	No	Majid Majidi
2017	Ferrari	Nader	Yes	No	Alireza Davood Nejad
2018	Rona, Azim's Mother	Azim	Yes	No	Jamshid Mahmoudi
2019	Oath		No	Yes	Mohsen Tanabandeh
2020	3 Puffs	Mojtaba	Yes	No	Saman Salur
2020	Killer Spider	Saeed	Yes	No	Ebrahim Irajzad
2021	Once Upon a Time, Abadan	Mosayeb Charkhideh	Yes	No	Hamid Reza Azarang
2021	A Hero	Bahram	Yes	No	Asghar Farhadi
2022	World War III	Shakib	Yes	No	Houman Seyyedi
2024	Pressure Cooker	Sirous	Yes	No	Rambod Javan

=== Web ===
Year	Title	Role	Actor	Screenwriter	Director	Platform
2013–2014	King of Ear	Ismael Zekavat / Esfandiyar Majbour / Haji Mohsen Talai	Yes	No	Davood Mirbagheri	Video CD
2014–2015	Fool	Houshang's Mother	Yes	No	Kamal Tabrizi	Video CD
2021	Mutual Friendship	Himself	No	No	Shahab Hosseini	Namava
2023	Set Me Free	Hatam Nayeb Sorkhi	Yes	No	Shahram Shah Hosseini	Filimo
TBA	Buried Alive		Yes	No	Shahram Shah Hosseini	

=== Television ===
Year	Title	Role	Actor	Screenwriter	Acting Coach	Director	Network
2006	Life on the Condition of Laughter		No	Yes	No	Mehdi Mazloumi	IRIB TV5
2007	For Sogand's Sake	Ebi	Yes	No	No	Seyyed Rahim Hosseini	
2008	SMS from Another World		No	Yes	No	Siroos Moghaddam	IRIB TV1
2008	The Escort Officer	Afshin	Yes	No	No	Saeed Soltani	IRIB TV5
2008	Yalda Night's Watermelon	Ghafar	Yes	No	No	Saeed Aghakhani	
2009	Boys Aren't Born Soldiers		No	Yes	No	Shahed Ahmadlo	
2010	Enclosure		No	Yes	No	Siroos Moghaddam	IRIB TV1
2011–present	Capital	Naghi Mamouli	Yes	Yes	Yes	Siroos Moghaddam	IRIB TV1
2012	Returned Check		No	Yes	No	Siroos Moghaddam	IRIB TV1
2017	AlalBadal	Aghasi	Yes	Yes	Yes	Siroos Moghaddam	IRIB TV1
2023	Homeland	Morteza	Yes	No	No	Kamal Tabrizi	IRIB TV3

== Awards and nominations ==
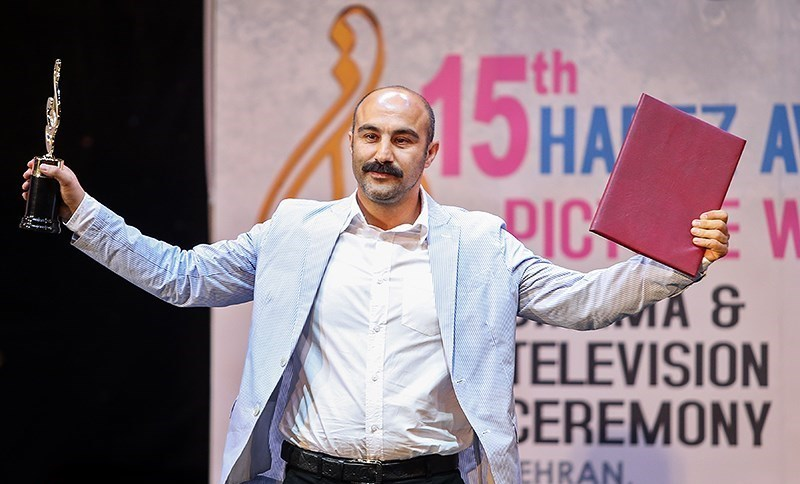
Mohsen Tanabandeh in 15th Hafez Awards (2015)

Award	Year	Category	Nominated Work	Result
Asian Film Awards	2023	Best Actor	World War III	Nominated
Asia Pacific Screen Awards	2019	Best Performance by an Actor	Rona, Azim's Mother	Nominated
Australia International Film Festival	2019	Best Actor	Rona, Azim's Mother	Won
Australia International Film Festival	2020	Best Director	Oath	Won
Diorama International Film Festival & Market	2019	Best Actor	Rona, Azim's Mother	Won
Fajr Film Festival	2008	Best Screenplay	A Petition for God	Nominated
Fajr Film Festival	2008	Best Actor in a Supporting Role	A Petition for God	Won
Fajr Film Festival	2010	Best Actor in a Leading Role	First Stone and Seven Minutes Until Autumn	Won
Fajr Film Festival	2011	Best Actor in a Supporting Role	Indigences	Honorary Diploma
Fajr Film Festival	2015	Best Actor in a Leading Role	Iran Burger	Nominated
Fajr Film Festival	2017	Best Actor in a Leading Role	Ferrari	Won
Fajr Film Festival	2019	Best Screenplay	Oath	Nominated
Fajr Film Festival	2021	Best Actor in a Leading Role	Once Upon a Time, Abadan	Nominated
Hafez Awards	2011	Best Actor – Motion Picture	Saint Petersburg	Nominated
Hafez Awards	2014	Best Actor – Television Series Comedy	King of Ear and Capital 2	Won
Hafez Awards	2014	Best Screenplay – Television Series	Capital 2	Nominated
Hafez Awards	2015	Best Actor – Motion Picture	Iran Burger	Nominated
Hafez Awards	2015	Best Actor – Television Series Comedy	Capital 3	Nominated
Hafez Awards	2015	Best Screenplay – Television Series	Capital 3	Won
Hafez Awards	2018	Best Screenplay – Television Series	Capital 5	Won
Hafez Awards	2018	Best Actor – Television Series Comedy	Capital 5	Nominated
Hafez Awards	2018	Best Actor – Motion Picture	Ferrari	Nominated
Hafez Awards	2020	Best Actor – Television Series Comedy	Capital 6	Won
Hafez Awards	2020	Best Screenplay – Television Series	Capital 6	Nominated
Hafez Awards	2021	Best Actor – Motion Picture	A Hero	Nominated
Hafez Awards	2023	Best Actor – Television Series Drama	Set Me Free	Nominated
Hafez Awards	2023	Best Actor – Motion Picture	3 Puffs	Nominated
Iran Cinema Celebration	2008	Best Actor in a Supporting Role	A Petition for God	Nominated
Iran's Film Critics and Writers Association	2008	Best Actor in a Supporting Role	A Petition for God	Nominated
Iran's Film Critics and Writers Association	2010	Best Screenplay	Seven Minutes Until Autumn	Nominated
Iran's Film Critics and Writers Association	2011	Best Actor in a Leading Role	Indigences	Nominated
Iran's Film Critics and Writers Association	2017	Best Actor in a Leading Role	Ferrari	Nominated
Jam-e-Jam Television Festival	2012	Best Actor	Capital 1	Won
Belgrade International Film Festival	2023	Best Actor	World War III	Won
Venice International Film Festival	2022	The Orizzonti Award for Best Actor	World War III	Won
Yas International Film Festival	2014	Best Actor	King of Ear	Won
Zurich Film Festival	2020	Best Director	Oath	Won
