= Mortal Wound (TV series) =

Iranian TV series 2021

- Persian: زخم کاری
- Genre: Neo noir; Mystery; Drama; Crime
- Created by: Mohammad Hossein Mahdavian
- Inspired by: The Tragedy of Macbeth by William Shakespeare; Twenty Trenched Gashes by Mahmoud Hosseini Zad
- Written by: Mohammad Hossein Mahdavian
- Directed by: Mohammad Hossein Mahdavian
- Starring: Javad Ezzati; Rana Azadivar; Saeed Changizian; Hanieh Tavassoli
- Composer: Habib Khazaeifar
- Country of origin: Iran
- Original language: Persian
- No. of seasons: 4
- No. of episodes: 43

Production
- Producer: Mohammad-Reza Takhtkshian
- Cinematography: Hadi Behrooz
- Editor: Sajad Pahlavanzadeh
- Running time: 50 minutes

Original release
- Network: Filimo (VOD)
- Release: 4 June 2021 – present

Mortal Wound (Persian: زخمِ کاری, romanized: Zakhm-e Kari lit. Trench Gashes from Shakespeare's Macbeth) is an Iranian neo-noir mystery drama and family series written and directed by Mohammad Hossein Mahdavian based on the 2017 Mahmoud Hosseini Zad novella Twenty Trenched Gashes, which is also based on William Shakespeare's play The Tragedy of Macbeth. The first episode was released on Filimo on 4 June 2021. The second season titled Mortal Wound: Return aired on September 8, 2023. It received negative reviews. The third season titled Mortal Wound: Revenge aired on June 14, 2024. The 4th season titled "Mortal wound: punishment" aired on December 6, 2024 .

The series is the most-watched home video series in Iran.

== Plot ==
-I love winter here, isn't it beautiful?

+Beautiful but difficult, they fly five thousand kilometers just to survive..At first it's very scary but at the end they find their home -If they reach the end

+If they know, they will reach.

Maleki is one of the managers of a successful company run by Rizabadi. Rizabadi instructs him to negotiate a major oil deal with the Norwegians. After signing the contract, the Norwegians want to transfer the contract amount, which is several million dollars to the company's account.

== Cast ==
- Javad Ezati as Malek Maleki (season 1,2,3,4)
- Rana Azadivar as Samira Bakhshi (season 1,2,3,4)
- Saeed Changizian as Naser Rizabadi (season 1,2,4)
- Hanieh Tavassoli as Mansoureh Rizabadi (season 1)
- Siavash Tahmoures as Nemat Rizabadi (season 1)
- Kambiz Dirbaz as Masoud Toloui (season 2,3,4)
- Morteza Amini Tabar as Meysam Maleki (season 1,2,4)
- Elahe Hesari as Kimia (season 1,2,3,4)
- Elnaz Malek as Sima Noh Kakh (season 2,3,4)
- Mehran Ghafourian as Reza Shafa'at (season 2,3,4)
- Kazem Hajirazad as Ahmad Mozaffari (season 1,2,4)
- Negar Nikdel as Sheida Shafa'at (season 2)
- Abbas Jamshidifar as Akhavan (season 1,4)
- Sara Hatami as Maedeh Rizabadi (season 1)
- Javad Hashemi as Dastmalchi (season 1,2,3,4)
- Mehraveh Sharifinia as Pantea (season 2,3,4)
- Mehdi Soltani as Habib Noh Kakh (season 3,4)
- Fatemeh Masoudifar as Ensieh Toloui (season 3)
- Manouchehr Alipour as Mozaffar Mirlohi
- Mahlagha Bagheri as Mahnaz (season 1,2)
- Mehdi Zaminpardaz as Najafi (season 1)
- Amir Hossein Hashemi as Karim (season 1)
- Niousha Alipour as Fortune-teller girl (season 1,2,4)
- Mahyas Pazouki as Hanieh Maleki (season 1)
- Kiumars Moradi as Samavat (season 1,2,3,4)
- Mohammad Hadi Ghomeishi as Amlashi (season 1)
- Maedeh Tahmasebi as Soudabeh (season 1)

== Reception ==
=== Critical response ===
The series received critical acclaim for its screenplay, direction, and acting performances. It also recorded the highest average rating of 99% for a drama on filimo with its first three episodes.

Mortal Wound received mostly positive reviews from critics. With an average of 20 million minutes of viewing, this series is the most watched series of the home television network, and in the 21st edition of the Hafez Festival, it was nominated for seven and won four awards, including the award for the best TV series and the award for the best actress in a drama for Azadivar. On September 17, 2023, the second season of this series will be aired on the Filmo platform under the title "The Return of Wounds".

=== Awards and nominations ===
Year	Award	Category	Recipient	Result	Ref.
2021	21st Hafez Awards	Best Television Series	Mortal Wound	Won	
2021	21st Hafez Awards	Best Director – Television Series	Mohammad Hossein Mahdavian	Nominated	
2021	21st Hafez Awards	Best Screenplay – Television Series	Mohammad Hossein Mahdavian	Won	
2021	21st Hafez Awards	Best Actor – Television Series Drama	Javad Ezzati	Nominated	
2021	21st Hafez Awards	Best Actress – Television Series Drama	Rana Azadivar	Won	
2021	21st Hafez Awards	Best Original Song	''Mortal Wound'' (Behnam Bani, Mehdi Darabi, Hamed Baradaran)	Nominated	
2021	21st Hafez Awards	Jury Prize	Javad Ezzati	Won	
2022	1st Iranian Cinema Directors' Great Celebration	Best Home Video Director	Mohammad Hossein Mahdavian	Nominated	
