= Centre Dürrenmatt Neuchâtel =

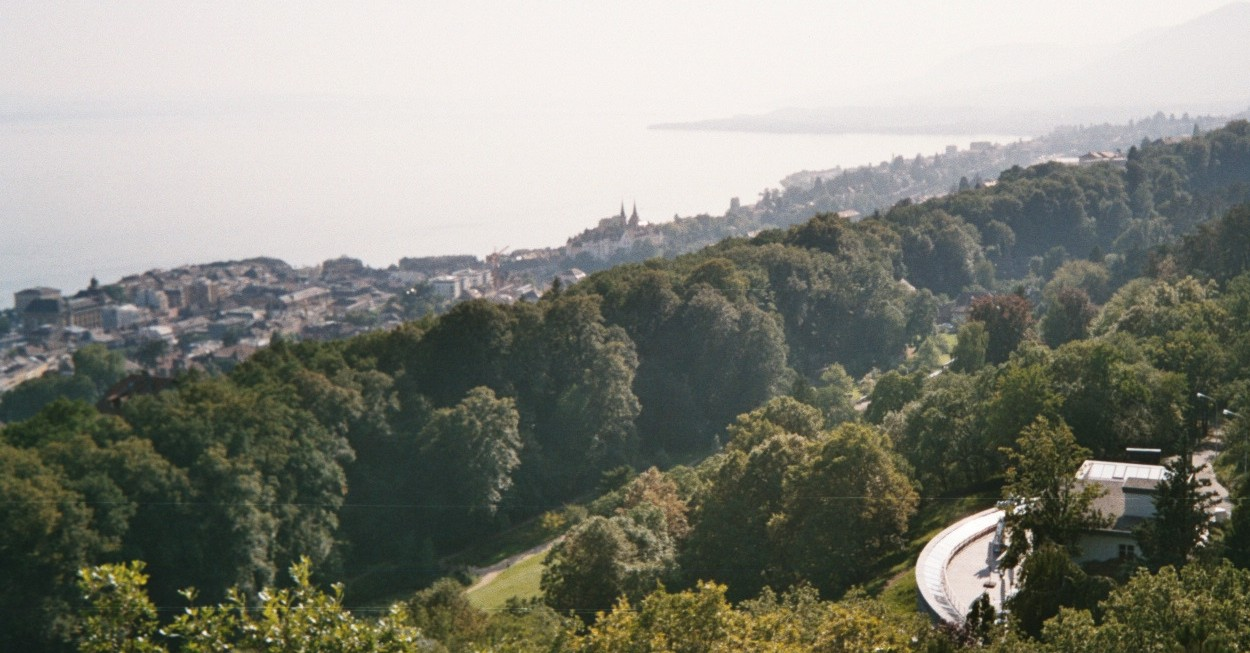
- Established: 23 September 2000
- Location: Neuchâtel, Switzerland
- Coordinates: 47.00119°N 6.936536°E
- Collections: Paintings
- Website: cdn.ch

The Centre Dürrenmatt Neuchâtel (CDN) exhibits Friedrich Dürrenmatt's paintings and drawings. It is a part of Swiss National Library, just like Swiss Literary Archives, which has a close cooperation with CDN.

The Centre Dürrenmatt, which was opened in the September 2000 above Neuchâtel, is located in the first Dürrenmatt's residential place in 1952. The Swiss architect Mario Botta was assigned to rebuild the house.

As a place for discussion and research, CDN supports critical debates about Dürrenmatt's artistic and literary works. Beside the temporary exhibition, the permanent exhibition "Friedrich Dürrenmatt, writer and painter" is open for public visit. Readings, concerts, colloquiums and debates take place regularly in the CDN. Apart from numerous exhibits of his literary works (manuscript drafts and notes) and rare exhibited paintings, the CDN offers a wide view over the Lake Neuchâtel and also the Bernese Alps.

== History ==
In 1952, Friedrich Dürrenmatt moved to his house in the upper part of the city, where he lived and worked until his death on 14 December 1990 (later in another building in that district). He took his life beyond the Röstigraben as a theme in one of his works, especially the reality that he lived in the francophone part of Switzerland since 1952, but he wrote in German language. After his death, his former house was adapted and expanded for being used as a museum. The museum was opened officially in September 2000.

== Previous exhibitions ==
- Friedrich Dürrenmatt, Writer and Painter, permanent exhibition
- Friedrich Dürrenmatt : Endspiele, from 6 April until 26 October 2003
- Dieter Roth : la Bibliothèque, from 6 April until 26 October 2003
- The Theater of Friedrich Dürrenmatt in Bulgaria, from 7 May until 20 August 2004
- Gotthelf-Dürrenmatt or the Moral in Emmental, from 31 October 2004 until 30 January 2005
- Varlin – Dürrenmatt Horizontal, from 24 April until 31 July 2005
- Hanny Fries : Dürrenmatt in Schauspielhaus Zürich, from 17 September until 17 December 2006
- Dürrenmatt and the Myths: Drawings and Manuscripts, from 11 February until 30 April 2007
- On the border of language, from 19 May until 2 September 2007
- Pavel Schmidt – f.k – Kafka's drawings, from 19 October 2007 until 10 February 2008
- Topor – Encyclopedia of body, from 16 March 2008 until 11 May 2008
- Paul Flora – Royal dramas, from 18 May 2008 until 31 August 2008
- Prag 1968 – 40 years spring of Prag, from 14 September 2008 until 19 October 2008
- Piranesis Carceri, from 10 December 2008 until 8 February 2009
- Caricatures: Sempé, Bosc, Chaval, Ungerer, from 15 February until 31 May 2009
- Pier Paolo Pasolini. Who I am – Qui je suis, from 14 June until 6 September 2009
- Martial Leiter – Guerres, from 25 September 2009 until 31 January 2010
- Dürrenmatt as Caricaturist: New acquisitions, from 3 February until 16 May 2010

== Previous performers ==
- Aki Takase
- Alexander von Schlippenbach
- Alice der Kevorkian
- Anna Trauffer
- Béatrice Graf
- Benoît Moreau
- Christy Doran
- Claude Berset
- Colin Vallon
- Daniel Humair
- Delphine Bardin
- Franziska Baumann
- Frances-Marie Uitti
- Fredy Studer
- Fritz Hauser
- Hildegard Kleeb
- Jacques Demierre
- Joëlle Léandre
- Jonas Kocher
- Katharina Weber
- Lauren Newton
- Léon Francioli
- Lionel Friedli
- Lucien Dubuis
- Marilyn Crispell
- Martin Schütz
- Mireille Bellenot
- Niklaus Luginbühl
- Nouvel Ensemble Contemporain
- Paul Lovens
- Pauline Oliveros
- Pierre Favre
- Roman Nowka
- Samuel Blaser
- Sylvie Courvoisier
- Urs Leimgruber
- Walther Fähndrich
