= Farzad Hassani =

Iranian television presenter, voice actor, actor and songwriter

- فرزاد حسنی
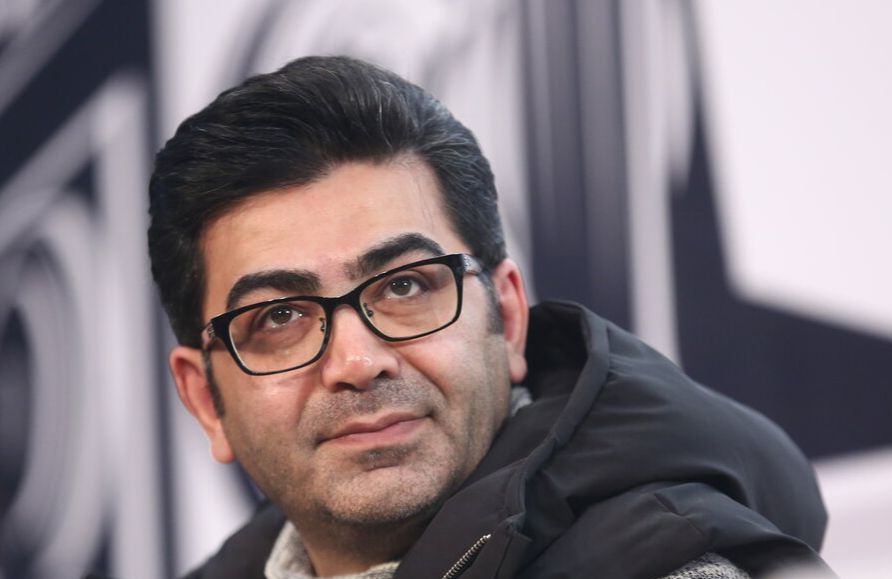
- Born: 11 September 1977 (age 48); Tehran, Iran
- Occupations: TV presenter, voice actor, actor
- Years active: 1996–present
- Known for: Presenter of Backpack
- Spouse: Azade Namdari (m. 2012; div. 2013)

Farzad Hassani (Persian: فرزاد حسنی; born 11 September 1977) is an Iranian television presenter, actor, and poet.

== Filmography ==
=== Series ===
- 2001: Traveler from India
