= Rana Azadivar =

Iranian actress (born 1983)

- رعنا آزادی‌ور
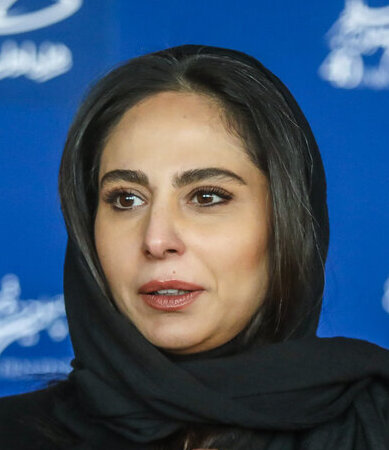
- Azadivar at the 2022 Fajr Film Festival
- Born: 6 April 1983 (age 43); Tehran, Iran
- Occupation: Actress
- Years active: 2003–present
- Spouse: Mahdi Pakdel (m. 2020)

Rana Azadivar or Ra‘na Azadivar (Persian: رعنا آزادی‌ور; born 6 April 1983) is an Iranian actress. She is best known for her role as Faezeh in The Lizard (2004). Azadivar gained wide recognition after portraying the leading role of Samira Bakhshi in the widely streamed drama series Mortal Wound (2021).

== Personal life ==
In 2020, Azadivar married actor Mehdi Pakdel.

== Filmography ==
=== Film ===
| Year | Title | Role | Director | Ref(s) |
|---|---|---|---|---|
| 2004 | The Lizard | Faezeh | Kamal Tabrizi | |
| 2006 | Havoo | Rana | Alireza Davood Nejad | |
| 2006 | Zagros | Mahsa | Mohammad Ali Najafi | |
| 2006 | Men At Work | Jalil's accompany | Mani Haghighi | |
| 2007 | Parkway | Raha | Fereydoun Jeyrani | |
| 2008 | Shirin | Woman in audience | Abbas Kiarostami | |
| 2008 | Familiar Territory | Mehrmah | Bahman Farmanara | |
| 2008 | Tehran In Search of Beauty | Sara | Mehdi Karampour | |
| 2009 | About Elly | Nazi | Asghar Farhadi | |
| 2009 | The Sun Behind The Snow | | Reza Sobhani | |
| 2009 | Lil' Pea | | Jalal Fatemi | |
| 2014 | This Apple Is For You | Bita | Sirus Alvand | |
| 2015 | The Girl's House | Samira | Shahram Shah Hosseini | |
| 2015 | Muhammad: The Messenger of God | Umm Jamil | Majid Majidi | |
| 2015 | Morning Is Close | | Yalda Jebeli | |
| 2015 | The Time I Came Back | Fara | Vahid Mousaian | |
| 2016 | Sound and Fury | Tina | Houman Seyyedi | |
| 2016 | Privacy | Darya | Ahmad Moazami | |
| 2016 | August | Roya | Bahman Kamyar | |
| 2018 | Bearer | Shahla | Bahman Kamyar | |
| 2018 | Vespiary | Mahtab | Borzou Niknejad | |
| 2018 | Istanbul Junction | Zohre | Mostafa Kiaei | |
| 2018 | Consternation | Leila | Abbas Rafei | |
| 2018 | Hangover Time | Nasrin | Mohammad Hossein Latifi | |
| 2019 | Tsunami | Parisa Hemati | Milad Sadrameli | |
| 2021 | Tara | | Kaveh Ghahreman | |
| 2021 | Be Human Once A Week | Ali's wife | Shahram Shah Hosseini | |
| 2021 | At the End of Evin | | Mehdi Torab Beigi, Mohammad Torab Beigi | |
| 2022 | The Loser Man | Somayyeh | Mohammad Hossein Mahdavian | |

=== Web ===
| Year | Title | Role | Director | Platform | Notes | Ref(s) |
|---|---|---|---|---|---|---|
| 2021–2025 | Mortal Wound | Samira Bakhshi | Mohammad Hossein Mahdavian | Filimo | Main role | |
| 2022–2023 | Jeyran | Taj ol-Dowleh | Hassan Fathi | Filimo | Main role | |
| 2023 | Vertigo | Fariba Moghaddam | Behrang Tofighi | Namava | Main role | |
| TBA | Untitled Homayoun As'adian project | | Homayoun As'adian | Filmnet | Main role | |

=== Music video ===
| Year | Title | Artist | Ref(s) |
|---|---|---|---|
| 2017 | The Cloud and the Rain | Homayoun Shajarian | |

== Awards and nominations ==
| Award | Year | Category | Nominated Work | Result | Ref. |
|---|---|---|---|---|---|
| Hafez Awards | 2005 | Best Actress – Motion Picture | The Lizard | Nominated | |
| Hafez Awards | 2021 | Best Actress – Television Series Drama | Mortal Wound | Won | |
| Hafez Awards | 2023 | Best Actress – Television Series Drama | Vertigo | Nominated | |
| Iran Cinema Celebration | 2010 | Best Actress in a Supporting Role | About Elly | Nominated | |
