= Men at Work (2006 film) =

- Men at Work Official Movie Poster
- Directed by: Mani Haghighi
- Written by: Mani Haghighi; Abbas Kiarostami
- Produced by: Mohammad Reza Takhtkeshian
- Starring: Mahnaz Afshar; Mahmoud Kalari; Reza Kianian; Fatemah Motamed-Aria; Atila Pesyani; Rana Azadivar
- Cinematography: Koohyar Kalari
- Production company: Āftāb-Negārān Productions
- Distributed by: Film Movement
- Release date: 2006
- Running time: 75 minutes
- Country: Iran
- Language: Persian

Men at Work (Persian: کارگران مشغول کارند, romanized: Kargarān Mashghoul-e Kār-and) is a 2006 Iranian comedy film written and directed by Mani Haghighi. It was awarded best film in 10th Dhaka International Film Festival.

== Plot ==
Four men on a skiing trip encounter a tall boulder standing precariously near a cliff. The men resolve to push it over but find the task to be more difficult than anticipated. Over the course of a day the men unbury the rock, culminating in the boulder falling unnoticed while the men argue about whether to continue.

== Cast ==
- Mahnaz Afshar as Sahar
- Ahmad Hamed as Mammad
- Mahmoud Kalari as Mohsen
- Reza Kianian as Jalil
- Fatemah Motamed Aria as Mina
- Atila Pesyani as Morteza
- Omid Roohani as Nader
- Rana Azadivar as Jalil's Accompany
