= Traveler from India =

- Persian: مسافری از هند
- Genre: Drama Romance
- Written by: Alireza Kazemipour
- Directed by: Ghasem Jafari
- Starring: Shila Khodadad; Soroosh Goudarzi; Hamid Goudarzi; Shirin Bina; Nasrin Moghanloo; Iraj Nozari; Farzad Hassani; Behnoosh Tabatabaei; Elham Hamidi; Majid Moshiri; Zohreh Fakour Sabour; Alirum Nouraei
- Theme music composer: Shila Khodadad; Iraj Nozari
- Composer: Mohammad Mehdi Goorangi
- Country of origin: Iran
- Original language: Persian
- No. of seasons: 1
- No. of episodes: 25

Production
- Producer: Sedigheh Sehat
- Production location: Tehran
- Editor: Hamid Seyfi
- Running time: 66 minutes

Original release
- Release: 8 June – 12 November 2001

Traveler from India (Persian: مسافری از هند) is an Iranian Drama and Romance series. The series was directed by Ghasem Jafari.

== Storyline ==
Ramin Naderi (Soroosh Goudarzi) goes to India to study. He is going to marry his cousin Parvaneh (Elham Hamidi), but he meets an Indian girl named Sita (Shila Khodadad) and brings her to Iran for marriage. But Sita's arrival in Iran creates problems.

== Cast ==
- Shila Khodadad
- Soroosh Goudarzi
- Hamid Goudarzi
- Shirin Bina
- Nasrin Moghanloo
- Iraj Nozari
- Farzad Hassani
- Behnoosh Tabatabaei
- Elham Hamidi
- Majid Moshiri
- Zohreh Fakour Sabour
- Alirum Nouraei
- Dariush Salimi
- Enayatallah Shafiei
- Bahman Goudarzi
- Kamran Fiuzat
- Hassan Assadi
- Tooran Ghaderi
- Felor Nazari
- Amin Zendegani
- Siamak Ghasemi
- Farahnaz Manfizaher
- Shabnam Moazezi
