= Mahmoud Hosseini Zad =

Iranian translator and playwright

- محمود حسینی‌زاد
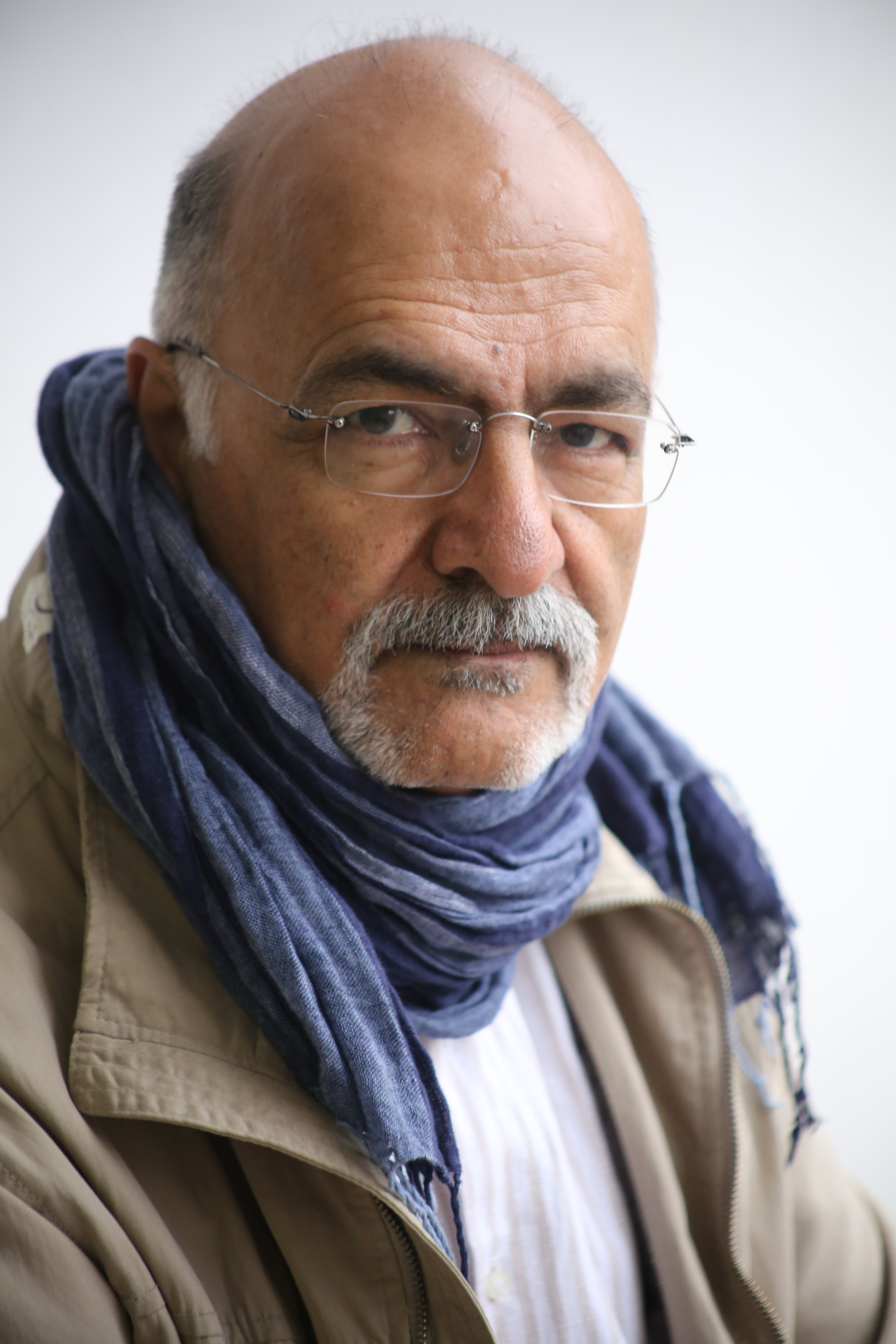
- Born: 8 April 1946 (age 80); Firuzkuh, Iran
- Citizenship: Iran
- Occupations: Translator, writer, interpreter, literature jury member
- Writing career
- Language: Persian
- Period: late 20th-early 21st century
- Genres: Short story, theater, novel
- Notable works: Asseman, kipp-e abr (The Sky, Full of Clouds), 2013; Asseman-e khis (The Wet Sky), 2012 (translation); In barf key amade... (When Did This Snow Fall ...?), 2011; Alice, 2009 (translation)
- Notable awards: Goethe Medal 2013; Haft Eghlim literature prize 2012

Mahmoud Hosseini Zad (Persian: محمود حسینی‌زاد; born 8 April 1946) is an Iranian translator of contemporary German literature. He is also a writer, interpreter, literature jury member and docent.

In the early 70s, Hosseini Zad graduated from LMU Munich in political science. Then, he came back to Iran and began to work as a translator for the Islamic Republic of Iran Broadcasting, IRIB, and also began to teach German language in the University of Tehran, Azad University, Tarbiat Modares University and language institutes in Tehran. At the same time he published two collections of short stories.

He has translated the works of Bertholt Brecht, Friedrich Dürrenmatt, Judith Hermann, Ingo Schulze, Uwe Timm, Peter Stamm, Julia Franck. He also wrote some plays, for which he was awarded.

== Invitation by the Centre Dürrenmatt Neuchâtel ==
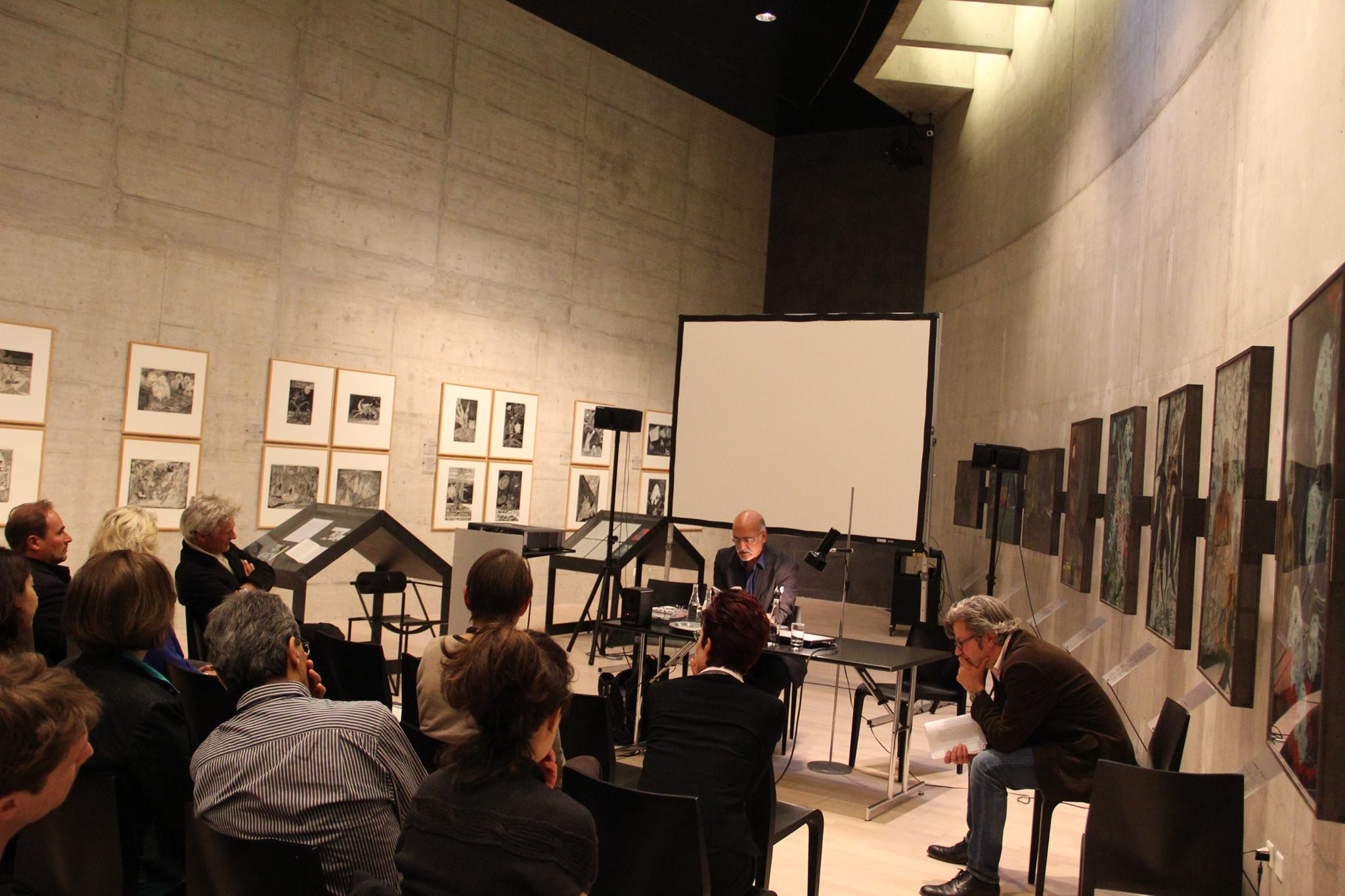
Mahmoud Hosseini Zad in the discussion circle in the Centre Dürrenmatt Neuchâtel

In April 2015, the Centre Dürrenmatt Neuchâtel organized a reading and a discussion circle with Mahmoud Hosseini Zad as part of the Printemps culturel. He spoke about the Dürrenmatt's popularity in Iran, his own activities as a translator and he read from his translations. He said about the Dürrenmatt's works in an interview with Schweizer Radio und Fernsehen:

Dürrenmatt is really famous and popular as a pessimist philosopher, who has a ironical bitter look to life...the government of Iran has a talent to interpret everything in his own way. In Dürrenmatt, it sees a critic of western capitalism, especially when he writes about the atomic bomb. Dürrenmatt criticize the West. The government and its censorship agency consider Dürrenmatt's works as a criticism of the west, as a criticism of capitalism.... These wicked and fighting the wicked. These are Dürrenmatt's themes. Humans and history and the philosophy. These are in the Dürrenmatt's works, but we iranians are mostly fascinated by the Dürrenmatt's philosophical aspect. Iranians love philosophy

— Mahmoud Hosseini Zad,

Hosseini Zad said about the censorship in Iran:

The limits of censorship are not clear in Iran. We have unfortunately censorship agency or control agency. They give us no catalogs or lists at all about what we as translators are allowed and what we are not allowed. they have themselves no control on these controls... When you bring a book to a control agency, you don't know, whether it will be allowed or will not be allowed to be published. For example the words about sexuality or eroticism. Maybe it seems funny, but these words are in the first priority of censorship, then the political words are in the second priority. After that on the third place come the words about alcohol drinks.

— Mahmoud Hosseini Zad,

In an interview with Deutschlandfunk Kultur, he said about some sort of censorship lifting in the Rouhani's era:

Well, I can give an example: The publisher, which publishes my translations, had 70 forbidden books in the Ahmadinezhad's era, but according my recent informations the number of forbidden books has been reduced almost to 10 or 13. It is obviously a censorship lifting.

— Mahmoud Hosseini Zad,

– Mahmoud Hosseini Zad: Deutschlandfunk Kultur He said about the cultural policy changes after Ahmadinejad:

There are already movements. A simple example is that the publisher of my translations in the Ahmadinejad's regime had 17 totally forbidden works. These works didn't receive any publish permissions but nowadays there are some freedom and hope, but there is also a gap and we hope it will be removed soon.

— Mahmoud Hosseini Zad,

== Translations ==
- Genet, Jean: Les Nègres, Play, translation: Siabarzangiha, Tehran, 2017
- Hermann, Judith: Aller Liebe Anfang, Novel, translation: Avval-e Asheghi, Tehran, 2015
- Wustmann, Gerrit: Grüngewandt, poems in two languages, translation: Sabzpush, Bremen, 2014
- Widmer, Urs: Herr Adamson, translation: Agha ye Adamson, 2014
- Schulze, Ingo: Handy, translation: Mobile, 2014
- Hermann, Judith; Özdamar, Emine Sevgi; Schlink, Bernhard; Schulze, Ingo; Stamm, Peter: short stories from various works, translation: Asseman-e khis (The Wet Sky), Tehran, 2012
- Hermann, Judith: Alice, translation: Alice, Tehran, 2009
- Krösinger, Hans Werner: Coming Home, translation: Bazgasht be vatan, Tehran, 2009
- Stamm, Peter: Agnes, translation: Agnes, Tehran, 2009
- Dürrenmatt, Friedrich: Das Versprechen, translation: Ghol, Tehran, 2008
- Timm, Uwe: Am Beispiel meines Bruders, translation: Massalan baradaram, Tehran, 2008
- Hermann, Judith, short stories from: Sommerhaus später and Nichts als Gespenster, translation: In souy-e roudkhane Oder (This Side of the Oder), Tehran, 2007
- Dürrenmatt, Friedrich: Der Richter und sein Henker, translation: Ghazi o jalladash, Tehran, 1991, revised edition 2006
- Dürrenmatt, Friedrich: Der Verdacht, translation: Sou-e zan, Tehran, 2006
- Berg, Sibylle; Franck, Julia; Hermann, Judith; Schulze, Ingo: short stories from various works by the writers, translation: Gozaran e rouz (Spending the Day), Tehran, 2005
- Böll, Heinrich; Handke, Peter; Kafka, Franz; Kant, Hermann; Mann, Thomas; Meckel, Christoph et al., short stories, translation: Maghbaredar o marg (Der Tod und der Gruftwächter), Tehran, 2005
- Lange, Hartmut: Italienische Novellen, translation: Hemayat az hitsh, Tehran, 2005
- Ostermaier, Albert: Erreger, translation: Virus, Tehran, 2005
- Brecht, Bertolt: Baal, translation: Baal, Tehran, 2001
- Brecht, Bertolt: Im Dickicht der Städte, translation: Dar jangal-e shahr, Tehran, 2001
- Brecht, Bertolt: Trommeln in der Nacht, translation: Seday-e tabl dar shab, Tehran, 2001
- Brecht, Bertolt: Einakter, translation: Tak pardei ha, Tehran, 1979
- Gorky, Maxim: Über Kinderliteratur. Aufsätze und Äußerungen, translation: Darbare-ye Adabiyat-e Kudakan, Tehran, 1978

== Own works ==
- Bist zakhm e kari (Twenty Mortal Wounds) - novel, Tehran, 2017
- Sarash ra gozasht ruy-e Felez-e sard – az koshtan o raftan (He Put His Head on the Cold Metal – From Killing and Abandoning) – short stories, Tehran, 2015
- Asseman, kipp-e abr (The Sky, Full of Clouds) – short stories, Tehran, 2013
- In barf key amade... (When Did This Snow Fall...?) – short stories, Tehran, 2011
- Siahi-ye chasbnak-e shab (The Leaden Darkness of Night) – short stories, Tehran, 2005
- Tagarg amad emsal bar san-e marg (This Year the Hail Came Like Death) – play, Tehran, 1997
- Nehade sar gharibane be divar (Like a Stranger She Leans Her Head on the Wall) – play, Tehran, 1996

== Awards ==
- 2013: On 28 August, Hosseini Zad received the Goethe Medal for his services and commitment as a cultural mediator par excellence in literature, theater and film.
- 2013: In a survey among the Iranian authors und critics by the Iranian cultural magazine Tajrobeh, The Sky, Full of Clouds was chosen as the best book of the year – in the category of story.
- 2012: In a survey among the Iranian authors und critics by the Iranian cultural magazine Tajrobeh, The Wet Sky was chosen as the best book of the year – in the category of translated stories.
- 2012: The short stories When Did This Snow Fall ...? was awarded the Haft Eghlim literature prize.
- 2010: The translation of Judith Hermanns book Alice was awarded the literature prize Es war einmal as the best translation of the year.
