= Shila Khodadad =

Iranian actress (born 1980)

- شیلا خداداد
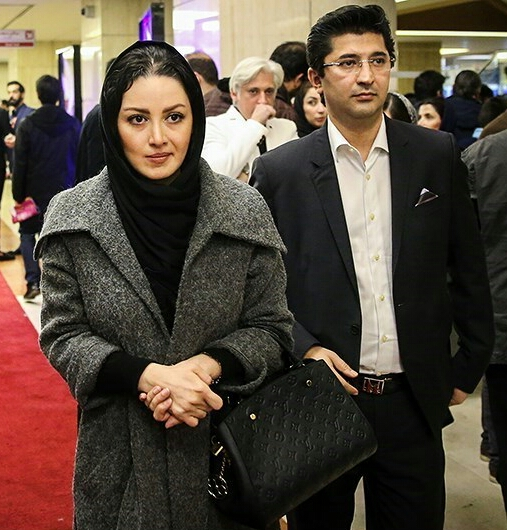
- Khodadad and her husband Farzin Sarkarat
- Born: November 5, 1980 (age 45); Tehran, Iran
- Education: Azad University
- Occupation: Actress
- Years active: 1999–present
- Spouse: Farzin Sarkarat
- Children: 2

Shila Khodadad (Persian: شیلا خداداد; born November 5, 1980) is an Iranian actress. She has played in some films such as Marriage, Iranian Style, Saint Petersburg and in a famous Iranian TV series, Traveler from India.

Shila Khodadad has a BA in Chemistry. She was discovered by renowned director Mas’ood Kimiyaee and made her film debut in 2000 with Objection.

== Filmography ==
=== Television drama ===
- Traveler from India (2001)
- SMS from another World (2008)
- Standardized Patient (2016)
- The Monster (2019)

=== Cinema ===
- Son of Adam, Daughter of Eve (2010)
- Saint Petersburg (2010)
- Marriage, Iranian Style (2006)
