= Nasrin Moghanloo =

Iranian actress (born 1968)

- نسرین مقانلو
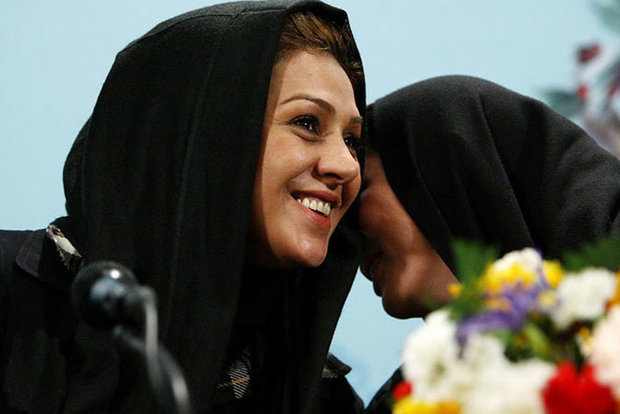
- Nasrin in 2017
- Born: June 22, 1968 (age 57); Tehran, Iran
- Occupation: Actress
- Years active: 1991–present
- Spouse: Kamal Khalilian (m. 1994)
- Children: Arsha; Arian

Nasrin Moghanloo (Persian: نسرین مقانلو, born June 22, 1968) is an Iranian actress. She has received various accolades, including a Hafaz Award.

== Filmography ==
- Traveler from India
- Mum's Guest
- Without Permission
- Superstar
- Loneliness of Leila
- Mokhtarnameh
