= Dariush Arjmand =

Iranian actor

- داریوش ارجمند
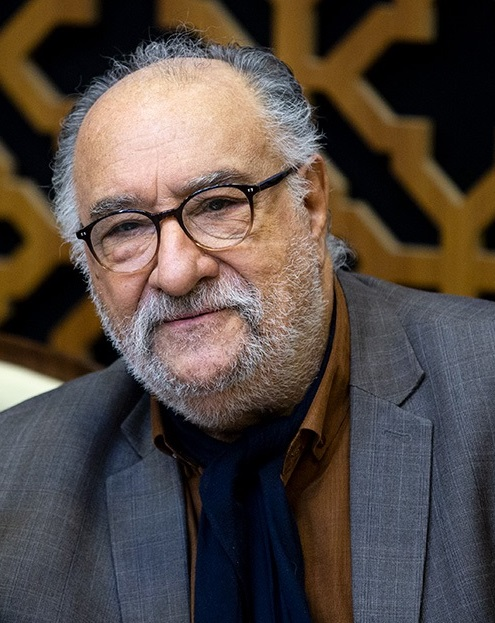
- Arjmand in 2020
- Born: Dariush Arjmnad; July 27, 1944 (age 82); Mashhad, Imperial State of Iran
- Citizenship: Iran
- Education: University of Paris; Mashhad University
- Occupation: Actor
- Years active: 1986–present
- Notable work: Once Upon a Time, Cinema, From Rey, Shaheed-e-Kufa, Mokhtarnameh
- Height: 180 cm (5 ft 11 in)
- Spouse: Fereshteh Yaghmayi
- Children: 3
- Relatives: Anoushirvan Arjmand
- Awards: Order of Culture and Art (1st Class)

Dariush Arjmand (Persian: داریوش ارجمند; born 27 July 1944 in Mashhad, Imperial State of Iran) is an Iranian actor.

A son of a military father and a housewife mother, he was born in Mashhad. He started performing in plays at the age of 12. At the age of 26, he started working for the Ministry of Art and Culture.

== Career ==
After many years of performing in theatre, he started his film acting career by appearing in Captain Khorshid (1986, Nasser Taghvaee), which was awarded the Crystal Simorgh for the best leading role at the Fajr International Film Festival. He also directed "Goft be zir-e solte-ye man ayid" in 1983

== Filmography ==
- Nakhoda Khorshid (1987 - a.k.a. Captain Khorshid)
- Kashtee-ye Angelica (1989 - a.k.a. The Angelica)
- Jostejoogar (1989)
- Pardehe Akhar (1991 - a.k.a. The Last Act)
- Nassereddin Shah, Actor-e Cinema (1992 - a.k.a. Once Upon a Time, Cinema)
- Zamin-e asemani (1994 - The Heavenly Earth)
- Adam barfi (1994 - a.k.a. The Snowman)
- Eteraz (2000 - a.k.a. Protest)
- Mosafer-e rey (2001 - Traveller of Rey)
- Sagkoshi (2001 - a.k.a. Killing Mad Dogs)
- Ezdevaj be sabke irani (2006 - Marriage in Iranian style)
- Raeis (The Boss 2008)
- The Maritime Silk Road (2010)
- Setayesh (2010)
- Jorm (2011)
- Banuye Shahre Maa (2011)
- Without permission (Persian: بدون اجازه) (2011)
- Harfe Mardom (2013)

== See also ==
- Cinema in Iran
