= Saint Petersburg (film) =

- Directed by: Behrouz Afkhami
- Written by: Peyman Ghasem Khani, Mehrab Ghasem Khani
- Produced by: Hamid Etebarian
- Starring: Mohsen Tanabandeh; Peiman Ghasem Khani; Bahareh Rahnama; Shila Khodadad; Andisheh Fooladvand; Sajad Afsharian
- Cinematography: Turaj Aslani
- Edited by: Mastaneh Mohajer
- Music by: Karen Homayunfar
- Release date: 5 July 2010
- Country: Iran
- Language: Persian

Saint Petersburg (in Persian: سن پطرزبورگ) is a 2010 Iranian comedy film directed by Behrouz Afkhami. Mohsen Tanabandeh, Peyman Ghassemkhani, Bahareh Rahnama, Shila Khodadad, Amin Hayai, Sajad Afsharian, Soroush Sehhat and Andisheh Fooladvand were among the actors and Peiman Ghasemkhani wrote the screenplay The film deals with the relation of a robber with the last tsar family of Romanovs.

== Plot ==
The two criminals are informed of the existence of a treasure with the key of a double-headed eagle, which is the legacy of the Russian Tsar. Both encounter events in their quest for treasure...

== Cast ==
- Mohsen Tanabandeh
- Peyman Ghasemkhani
- Bahareh Rahnama
- Shila Khodadad
- Amin Hayai
- Soroush Sehhat
- Andisheh Fooladvand
- Omid Roohani
- Naeimeh Nezamdoost
- Sajad Afsharian
- Ardeshir Kazemi
- Babak Borzouyeh
- Majid Shahryari
- Ali Asghar Tabasi
- Ebrahim Bahrololoumi
- Yousef Ghorbani
- Arash Taj
