= Azade Namdari =

Iranian actress and TV host (1984–2021)

- آزاده نامداری
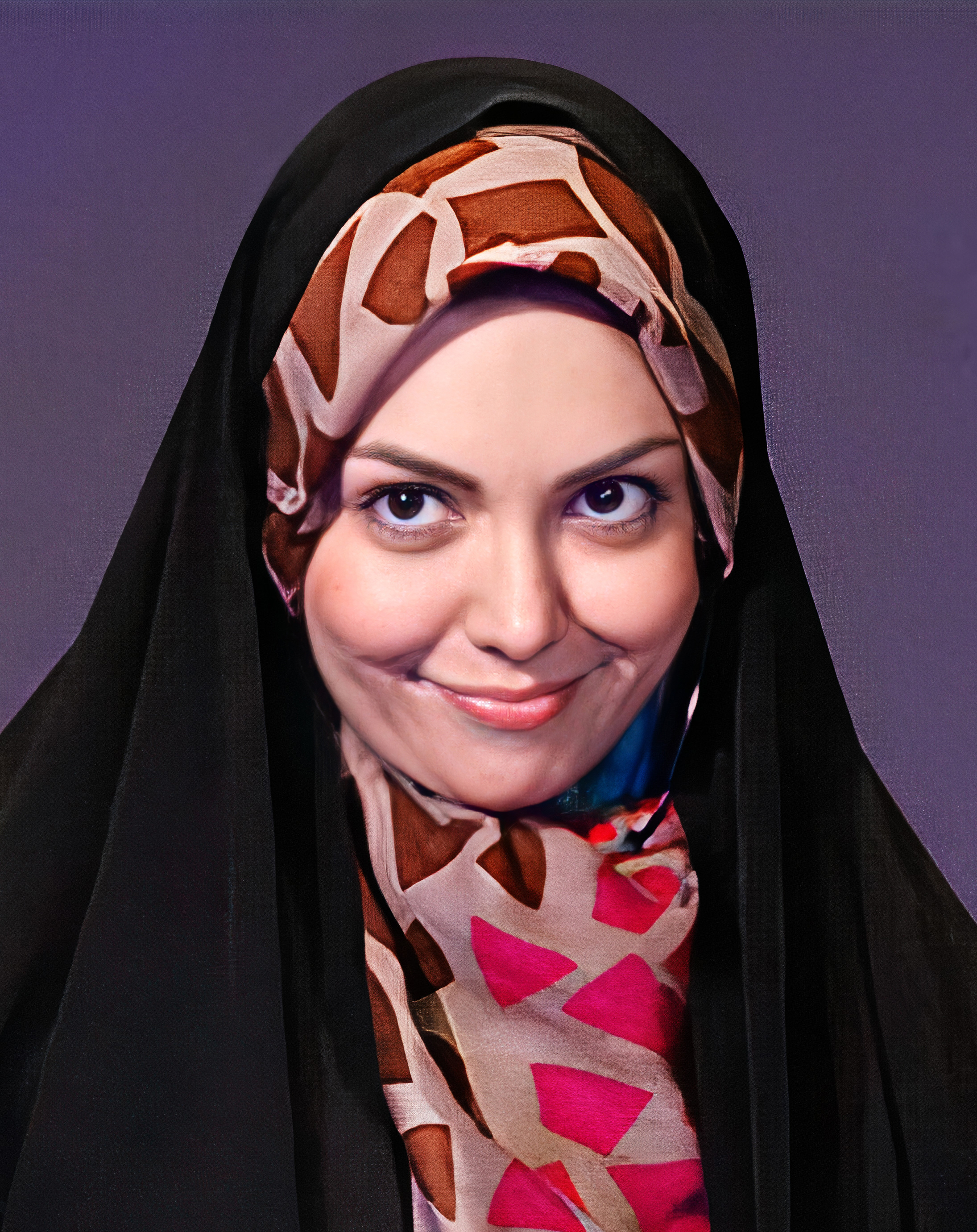
- Born: 30 November 1984; Sonqor, Iran
- Died: 26 March 2021 (aged 36); Tehran, Iran
- Resting place: Behesht-e Zahra, Tehran
- Occupations: TV host, actress
- Years active: 2004–2021
- Employer: IRIB
- Spouses: Farzad Hassani (m. 2012; div. 2013) Sajjad Ebadi (m. 2014)
- Children: 1

Azade Namdari or Azadeh Namdari (Persian: آزاده نامداری; 30 November 1984 – 26 March 2021) was an Iranian actress and television presenter.

== Controversy ==
On 25 July 2017, a video emerged showing Namdari drinking beer without hijab during a vacation in Switzerland. The event drew a backlash on social media as she advocated black chador and compulsory Islamic dress code in Iran.

== Death ==
Azade Namdari died on 26 March 2021, at the age of 36. According to Iranian news outlets, her body was discovered 48 hours after her death in her apartment in the Saadatabad area in western Tehran. Mehr News Agency quoted an "informed source" as saying that the cause of death was suicide.
