= The Lizard (film) =

2004 Iranian comedy drama film

- Film poster
- مارمولک
- Directed by: Kamal Tabrizi
- Written by: Peyman Ghasem Khani
- Produced by: Manouchehr Mohammadi
- Starring: Parviz Parastui; Rana Azadivar; Mehran Rajabi; Bahram Ebrahimi; Farideh Sepah Mansour; Shahrokh Foroutanian; Hossein Soleimani
- Cinematography: Hamid Khozui Abyaneh
- Edited by: Hossein Zandbaf
- Music by: Mohammad Reza Aligholi
- Production company: Faradis
- Distributed by: Farabi Cinema Foundation (World-wide); Faradis (World-wide); ICA Projects (UK); Barian Entertainment Ltd. (Non-US); Honar Aval (World-wide)
- Release dates: 4 February 2004 (Fajr Film Festival); 21 April 2004 (Iran)
- Running time: 115 minutes
- Country: Iran
- Language: Persian

The Lizard (Persian: مارمولک, romanized: Marmoulak) is a 2004 Iranian comedy drama film directed by Kamal Tabrizi, written by Peyman Ghasem Khani and starring Parviz Parastui as Reza "the lizard" Mesghali, a small-time thief. This is the first Iranian film that satirised the mullahs. The story of this film is an adaptation of the films We're No Angels and The Pilgrim. The film satirizes the clergy, religion, Iranian society, and life in general. A copy of The Lizard with English subtitles is widely available online.

== Plot ==
Reza Mesghaly, known as Reza the Lizard, is a thief known in criminal circles for his ability to bare-handedly climb all walls (which has given him his name, "the Lizard", or "Marmoulak" in Persian). At the very beginning of the film, he is arrested and charged with armed robbery. It emerges towards the end of the film that he had not committed the robbery. Nonetheless, he is sentenced to life in prison, and is met at the jailhouse by a strict warden, who says that his intention is to "make a person out of prisoners"; thus they will be led into heaven; "by force," if necessary.

Reza is very restless at the prison, to the point where he steals medicine from the infirmary in order to attempt suicide. He is unable to go through with the act, however, and is stopped by his cellmate, who in the course of fighting with Reza causes the medicine bottle to break and cut open his arm. Reza is sent to the hospital to recover, where he meets a cleric, also staying in the hospital, also by the name of Reza. During his stay, the two become friends, and Reza Marmoulak overcomes his dislike of the Islamic clergy to accept the cleric (akhoond) after he is told a profound statement which stays with him for the rest of the film - "There are as many ways to reach God as there are people in the world."

Before he is discharged back into the prison, Reza Marmoulak wears the cleric's clothing with the cleric's hint, and impersonating him, is able to escape the prison and contact one of his friends, who tells him to go to a small border village and contact a man who will give him a fake passport to cross the border with. In the meantime, the warden is informed that Reza has escaped, and seeing this as a personal blemish on his record, pursues the criminal to the border village. Arriving by train at the village, Reza is taken in by the villagers who mistake him as the new cleric who was supposed to join their mosque.

The remainder of the film documents Reza's attempts to get in contact with the criminal underworld to obtain his false passport, while the police pursue him at the behest of the warden; and all along Reza tries to avoid tipping off the villagers to his actions. In the course of this, he becomes something of a hero in the eyes of the villagers, who misinterpret his attempts to track down his false passport as his visiting the homes of poor people and giving them charity. These actions continue to draw the praise of the villagers, convincing those who have abandoned faith in their religion to come to the mosque once again to hear the sermons of Reza Marmoulak, most of which are derived from his brief contact with the cleric in the prison's hospital.

At the end of the film, Reza is finally tracked down by the warden, and on the night of a religious celebration at the mosque, he is arrested, without the villagers noticing. He hands over his robes to a small boy who had watched him over the course of the entire film, possibly the only person in the village who had guessed his identity all along, and goes peacefully with the warden and the police officer back to the prison in Tehran. As they are entering the car, the officer attempts to handcuff Reza, an attempt stopped by the warden and followed by his famous line, "That's not needed anymore".

The film ends with a shot inside the mosque, now being finally full of eager worshippers because of Reza. The police car leaves for Tehran, and it is not clear if Reza is in the car. Then, we see the worshipers in the mosque turn toward someone entering the mosque, as you would turn to welcome a cleric. This frame is frozen, and the same words spoken by the cleric in the hospital and the most important message of the film are heard for one last time; this time expressing Reza's destiny: "There are as many ways to reach God as there are people in the world." The police officer who had come to arrest him was the same one who has told him in the beginning that he needed “a diet for his mind.”

== Cast ==
- Parviz Parastui as Reza Marmoulak / Mesghali
- Rana Azadivar as Faezeh
- Bahram Ebrahimi as Mojaver
- Soheyla Razavi as Faezeh's Mother
- Mehran Rajabi as Shojaei
- Shahrokh Foroutanian as Haj Reza Ahmadi
- Farideh Sepah Mansour as Motazedi's Mother
- Maedeh Tahmasebi as Ozra
- Alireza Gholamnezhad as Hamed
- Reza Saeedi as Atef
- Naqi Seif-Jamali as Fazli
- Siroos Hemati as Mojtaba
- Hossein Soleimani as Gholamali
- Mehrdad Ziaei as Prisoner
- Davood Taeenezhad as Delangiz
- Farzin Mohades as Prison guard

== Release ==
This film was released 2 months after production was complete. The director had problems getting the movie released as many clerics found the movie offensive. The movie was released during Nowruz holidays in Iran, and had a very short, but successful run. Due to its controversial story, the film was taken down after about 3 weeks. The illegal version was released shortly afterwards and the people of Iran saw it. The film was broadcast many times by illegal networks in Iran. After 17 years, the film was licensed in Iran and is now legal. Supreme leader Ali Khamenei stated that he was opposed to banning the film and urged religious scholars not to take offense at the film. Director of the film Kamal Tabrizi also stated in an interview that Khamenei supported him in the production of the film.

== Awards ==
Year	Award	Category	Recipient	Result
2004	22nd Fajr Film Festival	Best Actor in a Leading Role	Parviz Parastui	Nominated
2004	22nd Fajr Film Festival	Best Screenplay	Peyman GhasemKhani	Won

- Golden Zenith Award for Best Asian Film at the Montreal World Film Festival - (Manouchehr Mohammadi)
- Award for Best Technical Film at the Filmfest Hamburg - (Manouchehr Mohammadi)
- Golden Statue of the Best Male Actor of the 8th Iranian Cinema Festival - (Parviz Parastui)
- Special Jury Award for the First Male role of the 22nd Fajr Film Festival - (Parviz Parastui)
- Crystal Simorgh of the Best Film from the point of view of the Spectators of the 22nd Fajr Film Festival - (Manouchehr Mohammadi)
- The First Special Album of the Best Director of The 22nd Fajr Film Festival - (Kamal Tabrizi)
- Interfaith Award for the 22nd Fajr Film Festival - (Manouchehr Mohammadi)

== Foreign adaptations ==
In 2014, Turkish television channel ATV began airing a mini-series based on The Lizard.
