= SMS from another World =

2008 TV series

- پیامک از دیار باقی
- Genre: Comedy
- Written by: Mohsen Tanabandeh; Saeed Aghakhani
- Directed by: Siroos Moghaddam
- Starring: Mohammad-Reza Sharifinia; Afsaneh Bayegan; Afshin Sangchap; Hamed Komaily; Hamid Lolayi; Reza Shafiei Jam; Shila Khodadad; Nader Soleimani; Soroosh Goodarzi; Ramin Rastad; Shohreh Lorestani; Giti Ghasemi
- Composer: Hamid-Reza Sadri
- Country of origin: Iran
- Original language: Persian
- No. of seasons: 1
- No. of episodes: 14

Production
- Producers: Amir Seyedzadeh; Production Manager: Mehrdad Motavali
- Production location: Tehran
- Cinematography: Amir Maghouli
- Editor: Ali Valikhani
- Running time: 45 minutes

Original release
- Release: 20 March – 4 April 2008

SMS from another World (Persian: پیامک از دیار باقی) is an Iranian comedy series. The series is directed by Siroos Moghaddam.

== Storyline ==
The series is about a swindler and miser named Mansour Simkhah who creates a fictitious lawsuit to escape from creditors, and pretends to be dead. Everyone thinks he is dead and buried as the series begins.

== Cast ==
- Mohammad-Reza Sharifinia
- Afsaneh Bayegan
- Afshin Sangchap
- Hamed Komaily
- Hamid Lolayi
- Reza Shafiei Jam
- Shila Khodadad
- Nader Soleimani
- Soroosh Goodarzi
- Ramin Rastad
- Shohreh Lorestani
- Giti Ghasemi
- Ezzatollah Mehravaran
- Reza Banafshekhah
- Dariush Salimi
- Manoochehr Azari
- Abbas Jamshidifar
- Karim Ghorbani
- Soosan Maghsoodloo
