= Under the Moonlight (2001 film) =

- Directed by: Reza Mirkarimi
- Written by: Reza Mirkarimi
- Produced by: Manouchehr Mohammadi
- Starring: Mehran Rajabi; Fereshteh Sadre Orafaee; Shaghayegh Dehghan
- Cinematography: Hamid Khozouie Abyane
- Music by: Mohammad Reza Aligholi
- Release date: February 2001
- Country: Iran
- Language: Persian

Under the Moonlight (Persian: زیر نور ماه, Zire Noore Maah) is a 2001 Iranian drama film directed by Reza Mirkarimi. It is the story of a young seminarian beleaguered by doubts about becoming a cleric.

== Plot ==
The young Hasan is about to become a cleric. He buys the clergy dresses as he is soon to be ordained. But a street kid named Jujeh steals his stuff including the clergy dresses. Hasan begins his search in order to find the kid. In this quest, he encounters a group of homeless people living under a bridge. His hesitations about becoming a cleric begin as he faces the real world outside the seminary.

== Reception ==
The film won the special jury award at Fajr International Film Festival. It was chosen as the best film at International Critics' Week which is the oldest parallel section of the Cannes Film Festival. The film also won the best film award at São Paulo International Film Festival and Beirut International Film Festival. It gained Mirkarimi the best director award at Tokyo International Film Festival.
