= Manouchehr Mohammadi =

Iranian film producer

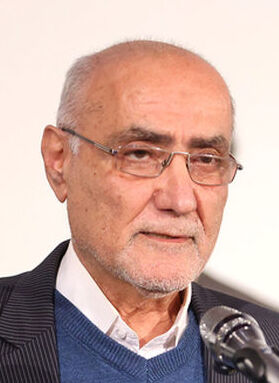
Manouchehr Mohammadi in 2026

Manouchehr Mohammadi (Persian: منوچهر محمدی; born in 1956 in Abadan, Iran) is an Iranian film producer. He graduated in sociology from Tehran University; began film producing with Hey, Joe! (1988, M. Asgari-Nasab). Founded a production company, Sina Film, along with Seifollah Daad and Manouchehr Asgari-Nasab. He was the Director of Supervision on Filmmaking in Ministry of Culture and Islamic Guidance (1997-2000).

== Partial filmography ==
- The Singer Cat (co), 1990
- I Love the Earth (co)
- The Spouse (co), 1993
- The Survivor (co), 1995
- Traveler of Rey
- Under the Moonlight, 2001
- Low Heights, 2002
- The Lizard, 2004
- Land of Angels (2026 film)
