= The Girl's House =

- Film poster
- Directed by: Shahram Shah Hosseini
- Written by: Parviz Shahbazi
- Produced by: Mohammad Shayesteh
- Starring: Hamed Behdad; Baran Kowsari; Pegah Ahangrani; Rana Azadivar; Babak Karimi; Behnaz Jafari; Mohammad Reza Hedayati; Nasim Adabi; Amir Ali Nabaviyan; Nader Fallah; Roya Teymourian; Hanif Soltani Sarvestani
- Music by: Yahya Sepehri Shakib
- Release date: 2015
- Running time: 75 minutes
- Country: Iran
- Language: Persian

The Girl's House is a 2015 film directed by Shahram Shah Hosseini, written by Parviz Shahbazi and produced by Mohammad Shayesteh and starring Hamed Behdad, Baran Kowsari, Pegah Ahangrani and Rana Azadivar.

After its release at the Fajr Film Festival, the film faced a lot of margins and parts of the film's story were removed. After changing the direction of the story, the girl's house was released in a limited way in Iranian cinemas on October 10, 2017.

== Movie story ==
The film tells the story of a girl named Samira who intends to marry Mansour. The day before her wedding, she takes Mansour Samira's mother to a gynecologist for an examination, but Samira, shocked by this, stops her and commits suicide in the street. After learning of his death to two of his classmates, they look for the cause of his friend's death, but the reason for Samira's father's suicide is hidden.

== Cast ==
- Hamed Behdad in the role of Mansour
- Kowsari rain in the role of spring
- Pegah Ahangrani in the role of Parisa
- Rana Azadivar in the role of Samira
- Babak Karimi as Samira's father
- Behnaz Jafari in the role of Aunt Mansour
- Mohammad Reza Hedayati in the role of the hall manager
- Nasim Adabi as Mansour's sister
- Amir Ali Nabaviyan in the role of Reza
- Nader Fallah in the role of housekeeper
- Roya Teymourian in the role of Mansour's mother
- Hanif Soltani Sarvestani in the role of Mansour's student

== Festivals and awards ==
- The fifth film from the public point of view (2.65) in the 33rd Fajr Film Festival
- Iran's representative at the Tokyo International Film Festival
