= Pantea Mehdinia =

Iranian actress

- پانته‌آ مهدی‌نیا
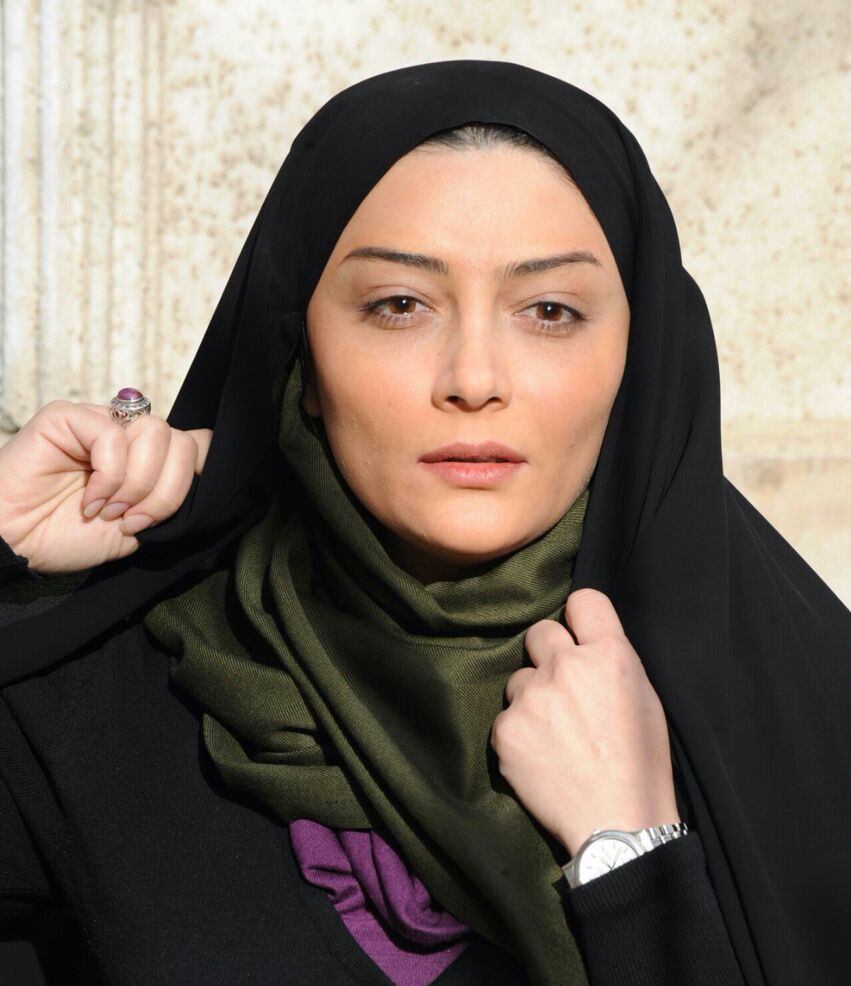
- Born: July 22, 1981 (age 43); Karaj, Iran
- Occupation(s): TV host, actress
- Employer: IRIB

Pantea Mehdinia (Persian: پانته‌آ مهدی‌نیا; born July 22, 1981) is a cinema, television and theater actress, radio announcer and painter from Iran.

== Biography, diary ==
She graduated in painting from Sourah University and directing from Art Academy and started her professional activity in 2013.

== cinematic ==
- Turtle and snail
- Shalovar directed by Hamid Nematullah
- I'm not crazy
- Mermaid
- Gitti problem
- Muhammad: The Messenger of God

== TV series ==
- Prophet Joseph (TV series)
- tree of knowledge (father)
- The tumult of the times
- eternal days

== Theater ==
- Restaurant
- Running with sore feet
- assembly of things
- Dry County
- Hexa City of Maidens
- Curse of the hungry class
- no problem

== director ==
For directing the short film Flasher, she received the second prize at the 62nd Prad Film Festival in France, especially for Iranian women filmmakers.
