= Marriage, Iranian Style =

2006 Iranian romantic comedy film

Marriage, Iranian Style ازدواج به سبک ایرانی
- Directed by: Hassan Fathi
- Screenplay by: Minoo Farshchi
- Starring: Dariush Arjmand; Fatemeh Goudarzi; Shila Khodadad; Mohammad-Reza Sharifinia; Amir Hossein Arman; Saeed Kangarani
- Release date: 2006
- Country: Iran
- Language: Persian

Marriage, Iranian Style (Persian: ازدواج به سبک ایرانی) is a 2006 Iranian romantic comedy film directed by Hassan Fathi. The film's release was delayed by censors, who insisted on trimming the role played by Canadian Daniel Holmes. It was especially popular in major cities in Iran and was also released in the United States.

The screenplay was written by Minoo Farshchi.

== Plot ==
It tells the story of love and eventual marriage of an Iranian girl named Shirin (Shila Khodadad) and an American engineer working in Iran (Daniel Holmes).

== Reception ==
Variety called the film an "alternately charming and overwrought Persian comedy of manners". Kevin Thomas wrote in the Los Angeles Times that Marriage, Iranian Style was "a most effective comedy, full of warmth and affection, that at the same time is remarkably daring, considering the tenseness of U.S.-Iranian relations", also noting that its "timely subtext tinged with melancholy over East-West relations".
