= Mohamad Kasebi =

Iranian actor and film director (1951–2025)

- محمد کاسبی
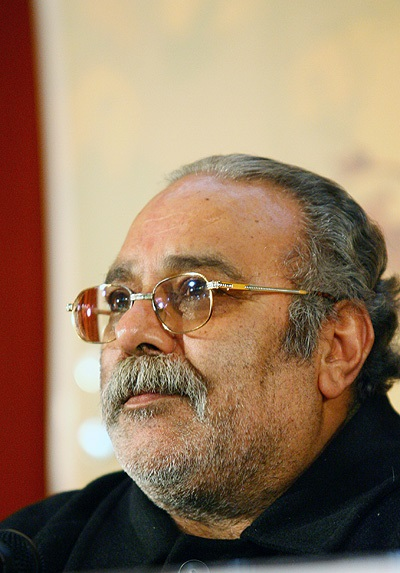
- Kasebi in 2007
- Born: 26 May 1951; Tehran, Iran
- Died: 11 October 2025 (aged 74); Tehran, Iran
- Occupation: Actor
- Years active: 1979–2021
- Spouse: Zahra Ardestani
- Children: 1

Mohamad Kasebi (Persian: محمد کاسبی; 26 May 1951 – 11 October 2025) was an Iranian actor and film director.

Kasebi was one of the founders of "Art Bureau of Islamic Propagation Organization" in 1979, in which he acted in many films and plays. After a few short films, he made his first feature film Swimming in Winter (1989) as writer and director. He won the Fajr Award for his performance in The Father from the Fajr International Film Festival.

== Life and career ==
Mohammad Kasebi was born in Abshar Alley, Rey Street, Tehran on 26 May 1951. He started his almost semi-professional theatrical activity with the theatre group at the age of 13 in the South Youth Palace in Railway Square. Kasebi participated in the entrance exam, and was accepted in the field of medicine, but due to his interest in studying theatre at the Faculty of Fine Arts, he gave up medicine and went to the army.

In 1974, after returning from the army, he participated in the entrance exam again and was accepted in the field of acting and directing film and theatre, and entered the Faculty of Dramatic Arts.

Kasebi performed dubbing before studying and during that time at the Drama College. During his college days, he played many plays, including "A Long Play" directed by Jafar Vali, "Mada" directed by Manizheh Moamedi, "Moonlight for the Deprived" directed by Shahnaz Jaberizadeh, "Scarecrows at Night", "Carol", He played "Passengers", "Sing in the Fog", "The World's Best Dad", "Spider" and و. Mohammad Kasbi was in the last year of the School of Dramatic Arts when the revolution won.

After the revolution, the first play that went on the stage was the work of the students of the Drama College, in which Mohammad Kasbi was also a member and in which he played a role. "Letter Movement" was written by Martyr Hossein Qashqaei and directed by Davood Daneshvar.

He founded the Islamic Thought and Art Center with some friends in early 1979, which was later renamed the "Art Center". He also founded the Performing Arts Center of the Ministry of Guidance. From the middle of 1981, the dubbing work, the management of the radio show unit and the responsibility of the Center for the Performing Arts left everyone and he devoted all his time and focus to the field of art and the beginning of filmmaking for the field.

Kasebi also wrote several plays, including the published plays "Leech" and "Archive". He also won the festival. In addition to all his responsibilities, he wrote and directed several screenplays, such as the screenplay "Swimming in Winter", which received a commendation from the Teacher Festival. Kasebi also wrote the films "Aphids" and "Messenger" and several other screenplays that have been approved by the Ministry of Guidance and these screenplays have been provided to the Farabi Cinema Foundation and the General Directorate of Experimental Cinema of the Ministry of Guidance. The script is "Home". He wrote a number of other screenplays that he never submitted.

In addition to acting in the field of art, Kasebi was also engaged in other activities.

Kasebi died in Tehran on 11 October 2025, at the age of 74.

== Other activities ==
- Theatre director of the Arts Department
- Member of the Theater Council of the Academy of Arts
- Member of the licensing council for showing special films
- Member of the Screenwriting Council of the Farabi Cinema Foundation
- Member of the Film Review and Licensing Council of the Ministry of Guidance

== Records ==
- Responsible for radio shows
- Launching the Center for Performing Arts
- One of the founders of the field of art
- Management of the theater unit of the artistic field
- Establishing and managing the affairs of the cities of the field of art to establish and launch the fields of art in the whole country.
- Member of the Ministry of Guidance Film Review and Licensing Council
- Member of the licensing council for showing special films
- Member of the Screenwriting Council of the Farabi Cinema Foundation
- Judge in all prestigious theater and film festivals in the country, including Fajr Theater Festival, Isfahan Children and Adolescent Film Festival, Resistance Theater, Holy Defense Film, Street Theater, Student Theater throughout the country
- Several times judge of film and TV series festival, secretary of Holy Defense Cinema Festival
- Secretary of the Holy Defense Theater Festival
- Membership in the Theater Council of the Academy of Arts

== Awards and honours ==
- Candidate for Crystal Simorgh for Badouk
- Candidate for Crystal Simorgh for Wall Film
- Get Crystal Simorgh for Father movie
- Received the statuette of the best actor of Asian cinema from Malaysia in 1997 for the film "Father"
- Receive a commendation plaque for the best play from the fifth festival of choosing the best book of sacred defense for the play "Archive"
- Receive a commendation plaque for the best screenplay from the Teacher Festival for the screenplay "Swimming in Winter"
- Received a certificate of appreciation from the fifth festival for selecting the best book of sacred defense for the play "Archive"

== Filmography ==
- Without Permission (2012)
- Boycott (1985)
- Refugee (1993
- Attack to H3 (1994)
- The Red Circle (1995)
- The Spouse
- The Inverted World (1997)
- Saint Mary (2000)
- Good comrades (2015)
- The Eighth Sky (2010)
- Come closer (2009) is not mentioned in the title
- Influence (2008)
- Wall (2007)
- Nima Yoshij (2006)
- Doll (2005)
- Baby I'm not Cook (2001)
- Holy Mary (1997)
- Inverted World (1997)
- Ambush (1997)
- Shades of the Sun (1995)
- Father (1996)
- Red Circle (1995)
- Moon and Sun (1995)
- Attack on H3 (1995)
- Refugee (1995)
- Companion (1987)
- Crisis (1987)
- Boycott (1985)
- Two Eyes Biso (1983)
- Repentance of Nasuh (1982)
- Another Death (1982)
