= Without Permission (2012 film) =

- Film poster
- Directed by: Morteza Ahmadi Harandi
- Written by: Ali Hoseyni
- Produced by: Mahmoud Fallah
- Starring: Mahdi Pakdel; Dariush Arjmand; Mohammad Kasebi; Nasrin Moghanloo
- Cinematography: Masoud Korani; Afshin Alizade
- Edited by: Varuzh Karim-Masihi
- Music by: Amiryal Arjmand; Farzad Varzande Azar
- Distributed by: Gouya Film
- Release date: 2012
- Running time: 104 minutes
- Country: Iran
- Language: Persian

Without permission (Persian: بدون اجازه) is a 2012 Iranian drama film directed by Morteza Harandi and produced by Mahmoud Fallah. The film participated in competition at New Look in 2012, the twenty-ninth International Film Festival competition section for the police. The film Without Permission was banned by the Ministry of Culture of Iran, and on August 4th, 2012 in Tehran and throughout Iran's cinema was screened.

The film stars as Dariush Arjmand the mighty, Mohammad Kasebi, Nasrin Moghanloo, Mahdi Pakdel, Amiry Arjmand, Hamid Taleghani, Baran Zamani, Faraj Golsefidi, Zohreh Hamidi, and Sanaz Kamalvand. Yasmina Baher was its introducer. Its composer was Varuzh Karim-Masihi who has led to the formulation and manufacture of trailer.

== Plot ==
20-year-old girl Yasi, very happy, friendly, open, and interested to buy from wealthy father constraints facing many emotional issues very cautious in dressing room of a clothing store... .

== Cast ==
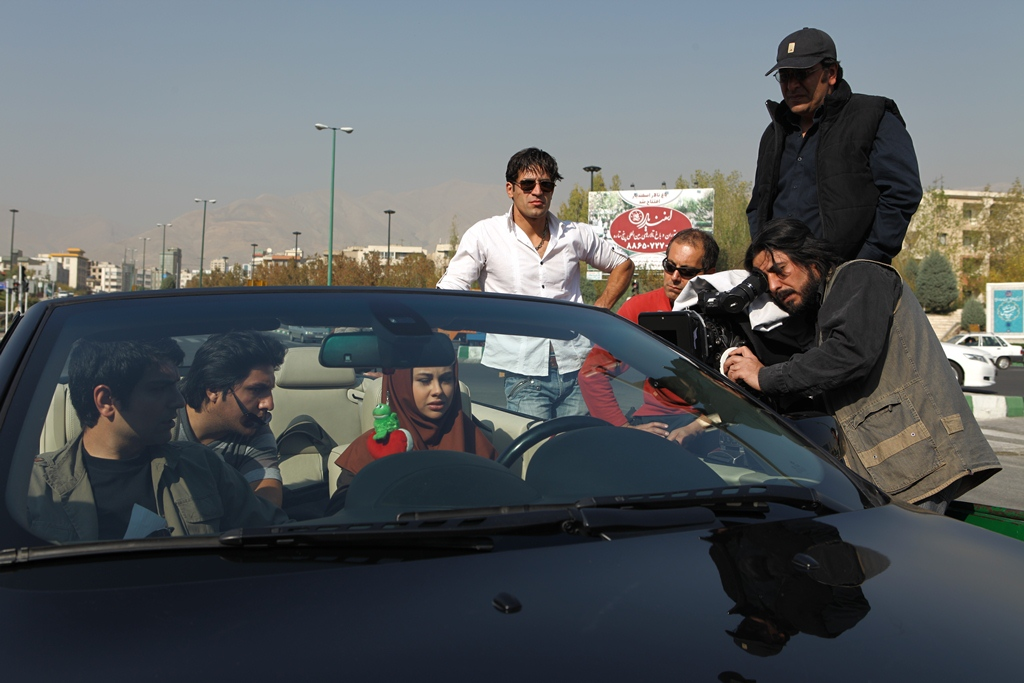
Behind the scenes film without permission Photographer: M. Pakdel

- Mahdi Pakdel as Amir
- Dariush Arjmand as Father
- Nasrin Moghanloo as Mother
- Mohamad Kasebi as Engineer
- Amiryal Arjmand as Shāhin
- Yasmina Baher as Yāsi

== See also ==
- Film cinematography
