= Sara Hatami =

Iranian actress (born 2005)

- سارا حاتمی
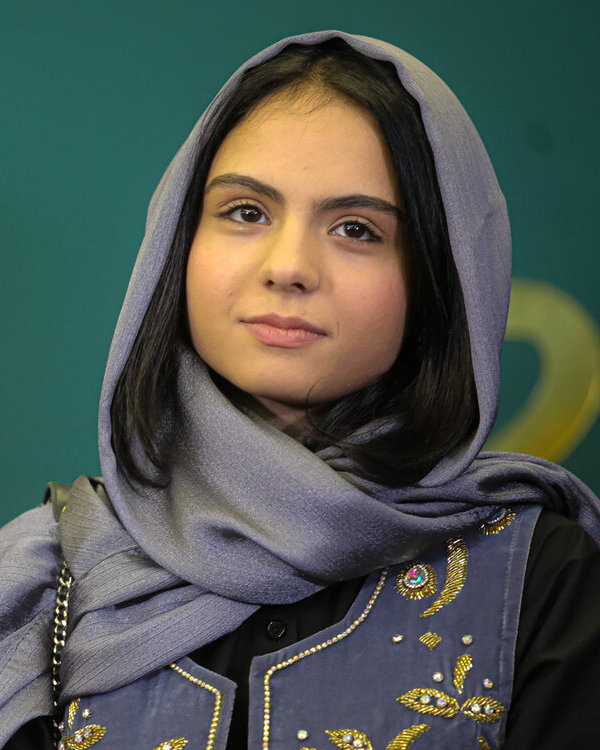
- Hatami at the 2024 Fajr International Film Festival
- Born: 2 June 2005 (age 20); Tehran, Iran
- Occupation: Actress
- Years active: 2015–present

Sara Hatami (Persian: سارا حاتمی; born 2 June 2005) is an Iranian actress. She gained recognition for her starring role as Maedeh Rizabadi in the mystery drama web series Mortal Wound (2021). In 2023, she won the Crystal Simorgh for Best Supporting Actress at the 41st Fajr International Film Festival for her performance in Leather Jacket Man.

== Career ==
Hatami learned acting in the classes of Ashkan Khatibi and was introduced to Kiyomarth Moradi by Khatibi. Moradi was the casting director of Mortal Wound (2021) series and he accepted Hatami after she auditioned for the role of Maedeh.

Her first professional role was in the series Mortal Wound which gained her recognition, and in her second acting experience, she won a Crystal Simorgh for her role as Soraya, an addict teenager in the drama film Leather Jacket Man (2023).

== Filmography ==
=== Film ===
Year	Title	Role	Director	Notes	Ref(s)
2023	Leather Jacket Man	Soraya Hajizadeh	Hossein Mirza Mohammadi	Won —Crystal Simorgh for Best Supporting Actress	
2024	Light Blue		Babak Lotfi Khajehpasha		

=== Web ===
Year	Title	Role	Director	Platform	Notes	Ref(s)
2021	Mortal Wound	Maedeh Rizabadi	Mohammad Hossein Mahdavian	Filimo	Main role; 13 episodes	

== Awards and nominations ==
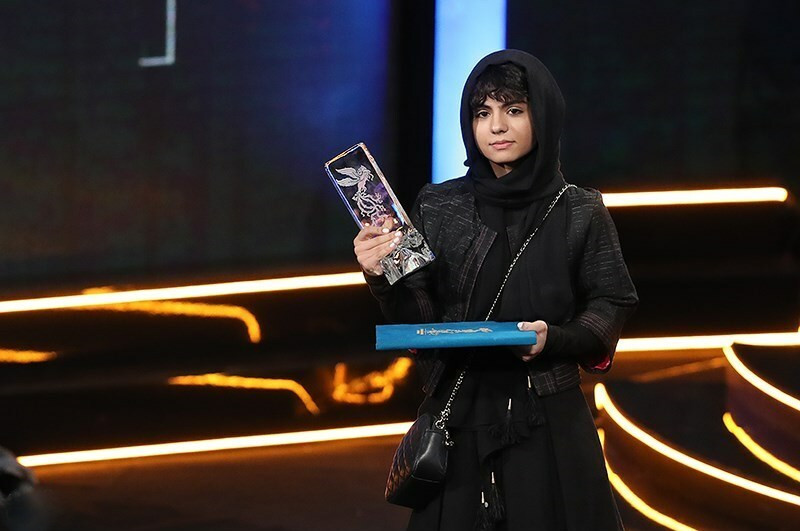
Hatami holding the Crystal Simorgh for Best Supporting Actress which she won for her role in Leather Jacket Man at the 41st Fajr International Film Festival, on 11 February 2023.

Name of the award ceremony, year presented, category, nominee of the award, and the result of the nomination
Award	Year	Category	Nominated Work	Result	Ref(s)
Fajr International Film Festival	2023	Best Actress in a Supporting Role	Leather Jacket Man	Won	
Fajr International Film Festival	2024	Best Actress in a Leading Role	Light Blue	Nominated	
Hafez Awards	2023	Best Actress – Motion Picture	Leather Jacket Man	Nominated	
