= Jonas Kocher =

Swiss musician and composer

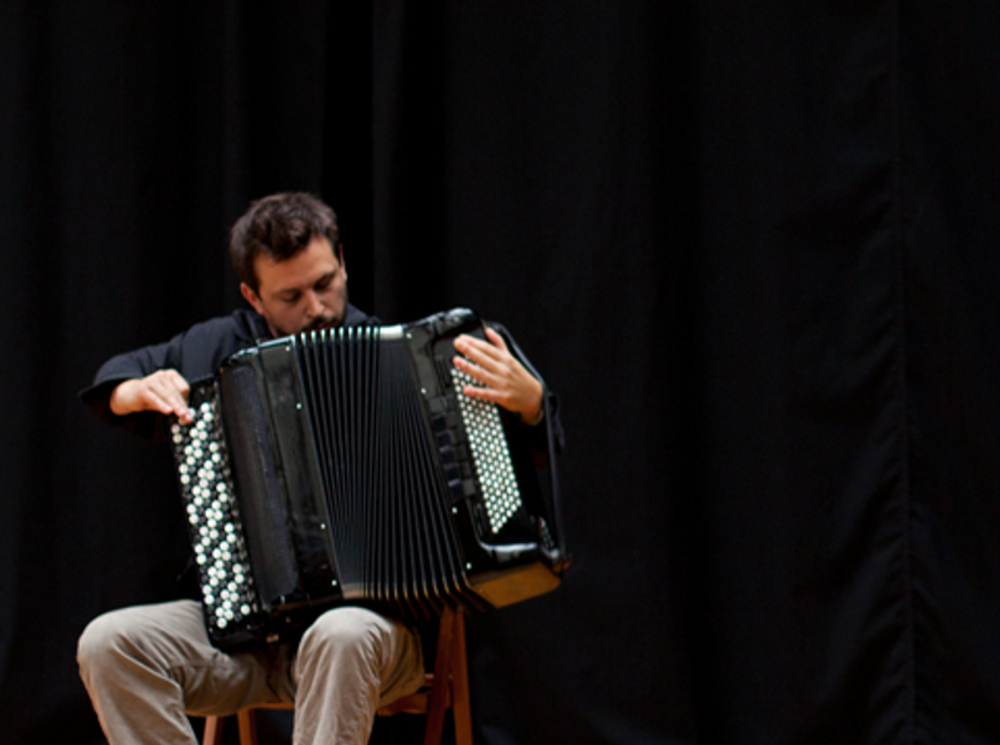
- Kocher in 2014

Background information
- Born: 22 August 1977 (age 48); Nyon, Switzerland
- Genres: Free improvisation, experimental music
- Occupations: Musician, composer
- Instrument: Accordion
- Website: jonaskocher.net

Jonas Kocher is a musician and composer born in Nyon (Switzerland) in 1977. He has been based in Biel/Bienne since the late 1990s.

== Biography ==
Composer and accordionist Jonas Kocher followed his musical studies at the University of the Arts in Bern, between 1996 and 2004 with Teodoro Anzellotti, Pierre Sublet and Georges Aperghis. He soon developed a keen interest in experimental practices in sound and performance, which led him to explore musical theater as a performer in productions by Ruedy Häusermann and Daniel Ott and electronic music in the BlindeKinder duo. Since 2003 he has been creating his own pieces of composed theatre, various sound performances and he also dedicates himself to composition and free improvisation. Starting from 2006 and for a few years, he has worked closely with Association Rue du Nord (Lausanne).

Since 2008, he has performed as accordionist with regular partners such as Jacques Demierre, Axel Dörner, Joke Lanz, Christian Wolfarth, Gaudenz Badrutt, Michel Doneda, Chris Heenan, Christof Kurzmann, Alfredo Costa Monteiro (in the accordion trio 300 basses with Luca Venitucci), Leonel Kaplan, Hans Koch, Burkhard Beins, Radu Malfatti, Ilan Manouach, Andy Guhl and many others. His musical activity has led him to perform throughout Europe and in Russia, Japan, and the USA and to collaborate with dancers and visual artists.

As interpreter, he has collaborated with musicians and composers such as Christian Kesten, Stefan Thut, Antoine Chessex, Chiyoko Szlavnics, and Radu Malfatti. If his practice of improvisation seems to contrast with his parallel interest in composition and sound performance, it is only because the creative dimension of these areas is not taken into account in its entirety; this is an area where Jonas Kocher sees a field of privileged artistic experimentation and where listening, sound and space are constantly explored.

As a composer, he has produced works that range between composed theatre, installations and concert pieces. He has composed occasionally for audio drama, dance and theater.

In 2005 he received the Art award of the city of Nyon and in 2010 the prize of recognition of the music committee of the Canton of Berne. Award Winner of the Liechti Prize for the Arts 2020. His works have been performed at Biennale Bern 2010, Musikfestival Bern 2017 and 2018, Umlaut festival Berlin, Festival Jardins Musicaux, The Forge London, Zagreb Biennale, SMC Lausanne, Thessaloniki Art Biennale, IGNM Zürich, IGNM Basel, etc.

== Works ==
- 2025: Pairing for five performeurs - Maulwerker, Berlin, DE
- 2024: Things in Common for duo - Eva-Maria Karbacher & Dimos Vryzas, Biel/Bienne, CH
- 2023: Diffraction (co-composition with Jacques Demierre, & Axel Dörner), for ensemble - GGRIL & DDK Trio, Rimouski, CA
- 2023: Interstices / Interferences (co-composition with Gaudenz Badrutt), for ensemble - Šalter Ensemble, Venezia Mestre, IT
- 2021: All Them Takes, for five amplified musicians - Puts Marie, Zurich, CH
- 2019: Perspectives and Echoes, for 6 players (percussion, live electronics and four instruments - Ensemble Studio6 Belgrade, Subotica, RS
- 2018: Avec Bataille, performance for 7 performers and one improvising musician - La Marmite, Geneva, CH
- 2018: HOME (Münstergasse 37), in situ sound performance for 4 musicians and 2 actors - Aabat Ensemble Bern, Bern, CH
- 2017: Irrlicht, for loudspeakers and four performers in a resonant space - Ginger Ensemble, Bern, CH
- 2017: Rough, for 10 musicians - Ensemble Phoenix Basel, Basel, CH
- 2015: hálos, for harp solo
- 2015: Intervention No. 2 [pasquart], in situ sound performance, Biel/Bienne, CH
- 2015: Intervention No. 1 [cave12], in situ sound performance, Geneva, CH
- 2013: Hornussen, in situ sound performance - Festival Rümlingen, Emmental, CH
- 2013: Nichi Nichi Kore Ko Nichi, sound performance, Biel/Bienne, CH
- 2012: Commedia, for piano, clarinet, violin, cello and pre-recorded sounds - Mercury Quartet London, London, UK
- 2011: Agitations (Adagio), for small symphony orchestra (young interpreters) and pre-recorded sounds, Biel/Bienne, CH
- 2010: Frictions, musical theater, Zurich, CH
- 2010: Promenade à travers une œuvre, in situ sound performance, Bern, CH
- 2010: Grrrrr!!, for string quartet (young interpreters), Malleray-Bevilard, CH
- 2009: Serge, for ensemble - Compagnie CH.AU, Vevey, CH
- 2008: Trois ombres, for ensemble (three pieces intended to be played with Schönberg's Pierrot Lunaire) - Szene und Musik, Zurich, CH
- 2006: Vallon de l'Ermitage, in situ sound performance, Neuchâtel, CH
- 2005: Dubbing & Naturjutz, for ensemble - Compagnie CH.AU, Vevey, CH
- 2005: Harmonie mit schräger Dämpfung und Sopranbimbo, for ensemble - Ensemble Paul Klee, Bern, CH
- 2004: Play Along, for tenor saxophone and pre-recorded sounds - Laurent Estoppey, Vevey, CH
- 2004: Kopf hoch! for 4 performers and 5 tape recorders, Luzern, CH
- 2004: Les Adieux, in situ sound performance / musical theater, Biel/Bienne, CH
- 2003: Bianca K., musical theater, Bern, CH

== Discography ==
- 2026 : Critical Values with Tiziana Bertoncini & Thomas Lehn, CD/Bruit
- 2025 : Diffraction DDK Trio + Le GGRIL, CD/Circum-Disc
- 2025 : Šablona with Tepih, CD/Sploh-Bruit
- 2025 : Archipelago CD/Bruit
- 2024 : Tri dela with Šalter Ensemble, CD/Sploh-Bruit
- 2023 : A Right to Silence with DDK Trio (Jacques Demierre and Axel Dörner), 3CD's box/Meenna-Ftarri
- 2022 : Stranger Becoming with Hans Koch, Frantz Loriot, CD/Bruit
- 2022 : Baldrian Quartett with Gaudenz Badrutt, Kai Fagaschinski, Christof Kurzmann, CD/Bruit
- 2021 : Perspectives and Echoes // Tautologos III with -bRt- group for music creation, CD/Bruit
- 2021 : Štiri dela with Šalter Ensemble, CD/Sploh-Bruit
- 2020 : oto no kage with Radu Malfatti, Klaus Filip & Christian Kobi, CD-r/b-boim records
- 2020 : Archytas Curve with Hans Koch & Gaudenz Badrutt, EP/Wide Ear Records
- 2020 : Abstract Musette with Joke Lanz, LP/Corvo Records
- 2020 : Flatwise Huddle with Gaudenz Badrutt & Andy Guhl e.o. LP/Edizioni Periferia
- 2018 : Cone of Confusion with Jacques Demierre and Axel Dörner, CD/Bruit
- 2017 : Spoon Bridge, with Michel Doneda & Christian Wolfarth, digital download/Bandcamp
- 2017 : Chiyoko Szlavnics ‘During a Lifetime, with Apartment House, Konus Quartet, Hannes Lingens, CD/Another Timbre
- 2017 : HumaNoise Tutti , with Erel, Kakaliagou, Marshall, Marwedel, Nabicht, Phillipp, Rodrigues, Schliemann, Souchal, CD/Creative Sources
- 2016 : Jonas Kocher plays Christian Kesten & Stefan Thut, CD/Bruit
- 2016 : Floating piece of space with Jacques Demierre and Axel Dörner, LP/label cave12
- 2016 : Kocher-Manouach-Papageorgiou, CD/Bruit
- 2015 : Tria Atoma, 300 Basses (Alfredo Costa Monteiro, Jonas Kocher et Luca Venitucci), CD/Moving Furniture Records
- 2015 : Rotonda with Gaudenz Badrutt and Ilia Belorukov, CD/Intonema
- 2015 : Koch-Kocher-Badrutt with Hans Koch and Gaudenz Badrutt, CD/Bruit
- 2015 : Skeleton Drafts with Ilan Manouach, CD/BRUIT-Romvos
- 2014 : Cinéma Rex with Gaudenz Badrutt, free download/Insubordination
- 2013 : Le Belvédère du Rayon Vert with Michel Doneda, CD/Flexion records
- 2013 : Öcca with Jacques Demierre, Cyril Bondy and D'Incise, LP/Bocian records
- 2012 : Sei Ritornelli, 300 Basses (Alfredo Costa Monteiro, Jonas Kocher and Lucas Venitucci), CD/Potlatch
- 2012 : Strategy of behaviour in unexpected situations, with Gaudenz Badrutt, CD free download/Insubordination
- 2012 : Duos 2011 with H. Koch, P. Bosshard, G. Badrutt, C. Wolfarth, C. Schiller, U. Leimgruber, C. Müller, CD/Flexion records 2012
- 2012 : archive #1, with Insub meta orchestra, CD and free download/Insubordination
- 2012 : D'Incise-Henning-Kocher-Sciss, CD-r and free download/Insubordination
- 2011 : Udarnik with Michel Doneda, Tomaz Grom and Tao G.V. Sambolec, CD/L'Innomable
- 2011 : Action mécanique with Michel Doneda, CD/Flexion records
- 2011 : Solo, CD and free download/Insubordination
- 2011 : ///grape skin with Michel Doneda and Christophe Schiller, CD/Another Timbre
- 2009 : Materials, CD/Creative Sources
- 2009 : Live at St-Gervais, Ensemble Rue du Nord, CD-r and free download/Insubordination
- 2009 : Müküs with Morgane Gallay, Lionel Gafner, Lucien Dubuis, Vincent Membrez and Fred Bürki, CD/Veto records
- 2009 : Blank Disc w/Jonas Kocher with Srdjan Muc and Robert Roza, CD-r
- 2006 : BlindeKinder [helfen bauen] with Raphael Raccuia, CD/Everest records
