= Morteza Ahmadi Harandi =

Iranian film and television director (born 1966)

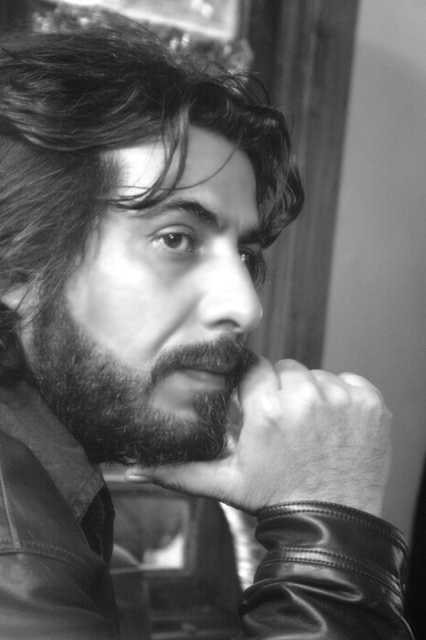
- Born: مرتضی احمدی هرندی; 21 May 1966 (age 60); Isfahan, Iran
- Education: Iran Broadcasting University
- Occupations: Film director, screenwriter, film producer
- Years active: 1988–present
- Notable work: Without permission(Bedoone Ejaze)

Morteza Ahmadi Harandi (Persian: مرتضی احمدی هرندی; born May 21, 1966) is an Iranian film and television director. He next directed his account experience in screenwriting, editing, producing, and teaching at the Iranian Young Cinema Society is having, he then acting and directing multi-showand making handicrafts. The film Without Permission (Persian: بدون اجازه) is his last film which he directed in 2012.

== Directed ==
=== Films ===
- Without Permission (Bedoon-e ejazeh), 2010
- Parvin (Parvin E'tesami), 2005
- Inflammation (Eltehab), 1994

=== Television ===
- Telefilms Node (Kheft), 1987
- Security alarm (series), 1992
- For the last time (Baraye akharin bar) (series), 1995
- Beyond the home (Khane-ye an-soo-ye rood) (series), 1997
- Familiar Strangers (Gharib-e ashena) (series), 1998
- Gray Land (Sarzamin-e khakestari) (series) (26 episodes), 2001
- American lawyer (Vakil-e Amrikayi) (tele-drama), 2005
- Empty frames (Ghab-ha-ye khali) (series), 2006–2007
- The Last Empty Frame (Akharin ghab-e khali), 2009
- Thirty-nine weeks (39 hafte) (series), 2014

=== Sarmstnd ===
- Beyond Thought (mavaray andishe) (set) 8 part 1994
- Our Iran (iran ma) (set)90 part 1996
- Passengers of spring (losaferan e bahar) (set) 30 part 1997
- Here Iran (inja iran ast) (set) 120 part 1997
- What you have asked (set) 8 part 1998
- Immigrants of Green (mohajerin e sabz) (set) 8 part 1999
- September Song (ahang e mehr) 2001
- Portrait of a lasting (simay mandegar) (set) 19 part 2002
- Last thirsty zayande river (akharin zendeh zayande rood) 2003
- Love, Mirror, Ashura (eshgh, ayeneh, ashoora) (set) 13 part 2004

== Producer ==
- Telefilms Node (kheft) 1987
- Inflammation (eltehab) (Movie) 1994
- The third puzzle (moamay sevom) (Movie) 1988
- Light soil (khak e taban) (Series) 8 part 2005
- Empty frames (ghab hay khali) (Series) 15 part 2007
- The Last Empty Frame (akharin ghab khali) (Movie) 2008
- Helper (yavar) (telefilms) 2013
- Taxi meters (telefilms) 2014
- Do not tell me scrap (be man nagoo ghoraze) (telefilms) 2014
- limousine (telefilms) 2014

== Editor ==
- Telefilms Node (kheft) 1987
- inflammation (eltehab) (Movie) 1994
- Beyond the home (khaney ansooy rood) (Series) 1997
- An island of dry land (jazirei dar khoshki) (Series) 20 part 1997
- a long day (yek rooz e toolani) 1998
- Dad shy (babay khejalati) (Series) 13 part 2004
- American lawyer "Queen French" (Tele drama) 2005
- Parvin (Movie) 2005
- The Last Empty Frame (akharin ghab e khali) (Movie) 2008
- Empty frames (ghab hay khali) (Series) 15 part 2007
- Gray Land (sarzamin e khakestari) (Series) 26 part 2001
- Freer from the sea (rahatar az darya) (Movie) 2011
- The third puzzle (moamay sevom) (Movie) 1988
- No home address (Movie) 2015

== Scriptwriting ==
- Insight (basirat) 1985
- Node (kheft) 1987
- Throne of love (sarir e eshgh) 1988
- Police of warn (Series) 1991
- inflammation (eltehab) 1994
- for the last time (akharin ghab khali) (Series) 1995
- Face friend (rokh e yar) 1998
- Empty frames (ghab hay khali) (Series) 15 part 2007
- The third Twilight (sevomin sepide dam) 2010
- Born in Iran (motovald e iran) 1997
- The Last Empty Frame (akharin ghab e khali) (Movie) 2008
- Neglect (gheflat) 2009
- Greed (tamae) 2009
- The Narieh 2013

=== Rewrite the script ===
- Empty frames (Series) 15 part 2007
- Without permission 2010

== Short film ==
- Insight (basirat) 1986
- Neglect (gheflat) 2009
- Greed (tamae) 2009

== Attending the festival ==
- Fajr Film Festival 2010
- Police Film Festival 2011

== Gallery ==
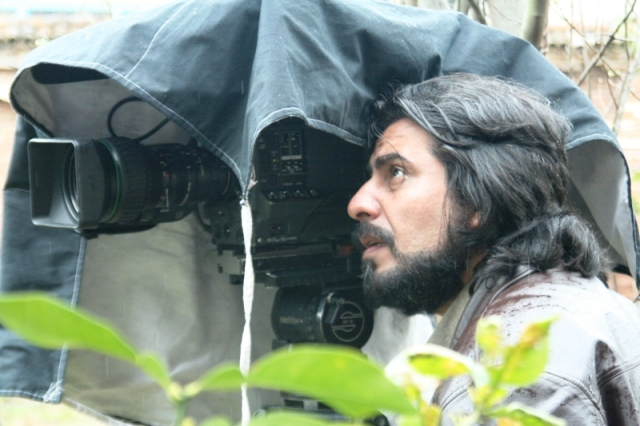
Behind the scenes of the series Empty frames

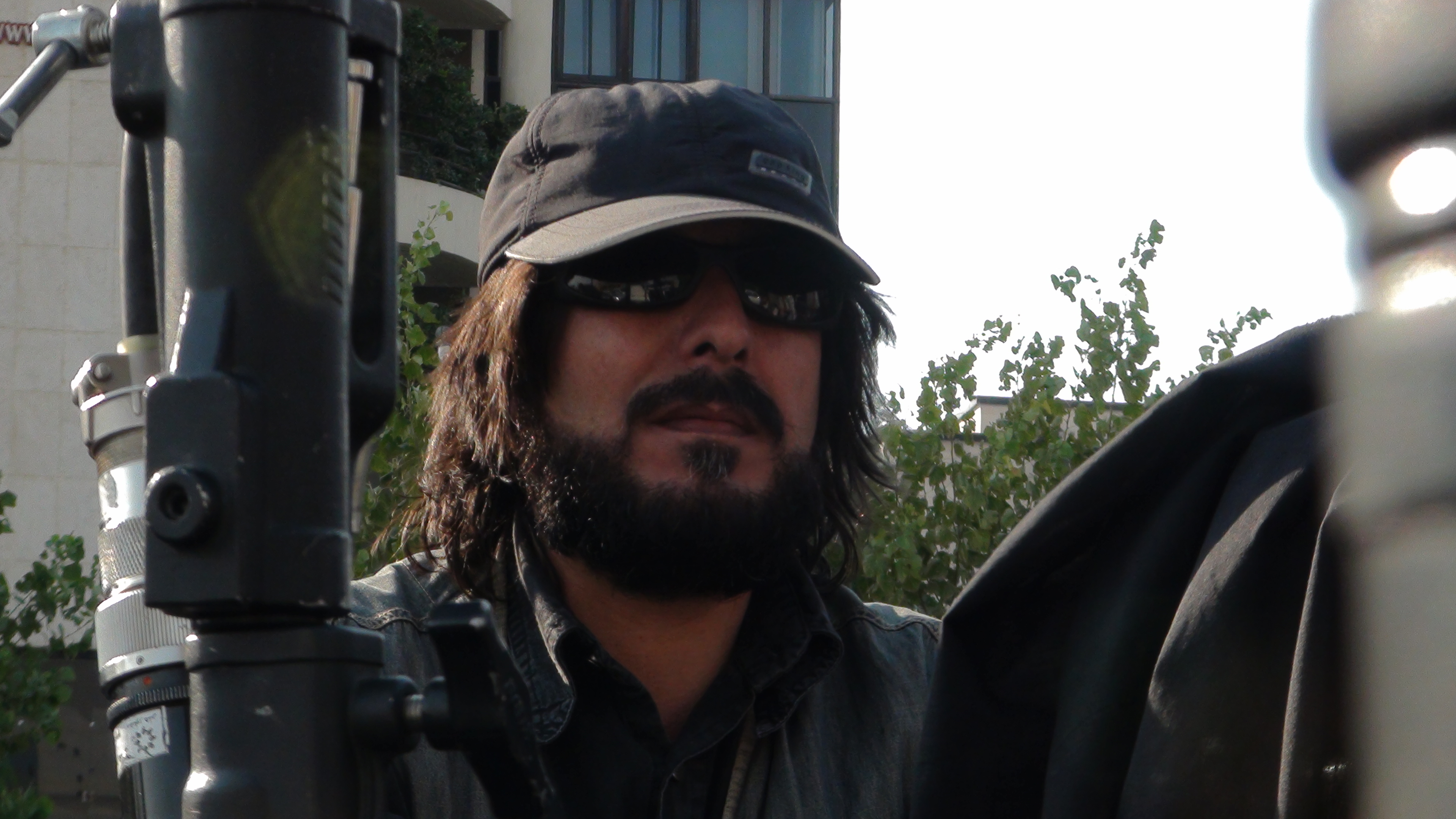
Behind the scenes of the film Without Permission

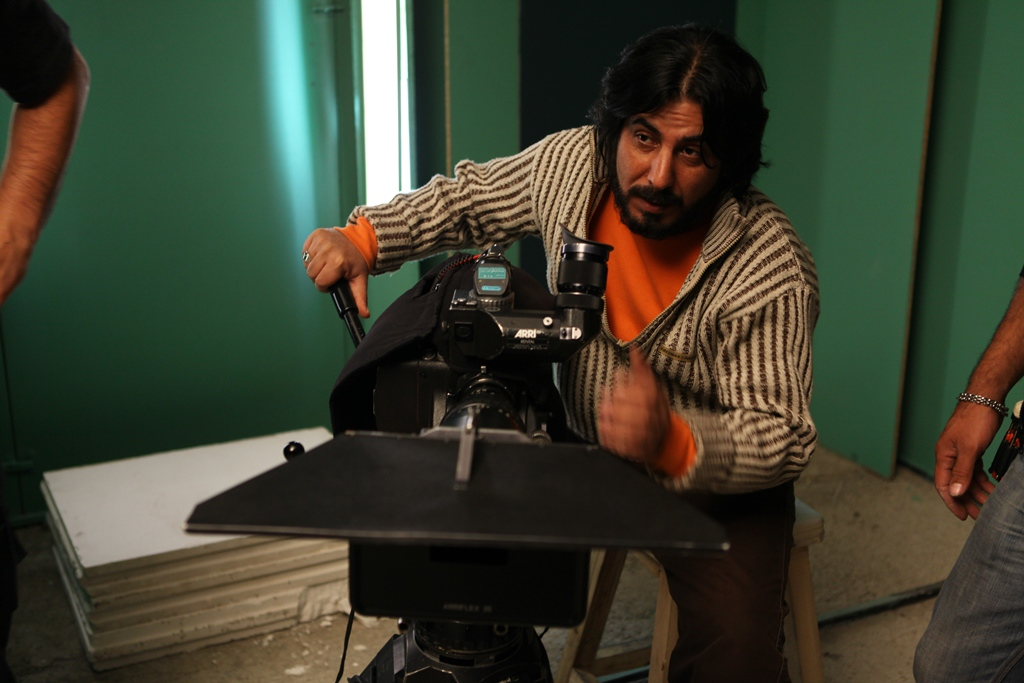
Behind the scenes of the film Without Permission

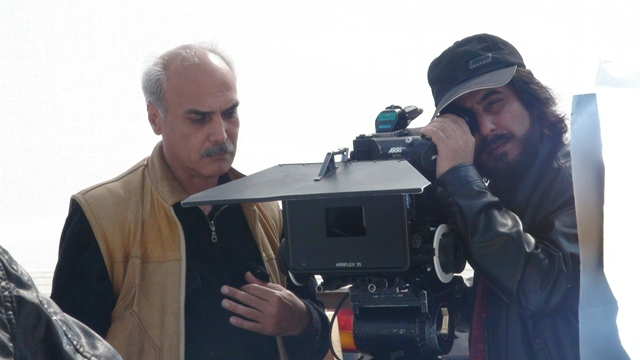
Behind the scenes of the film Without Permission

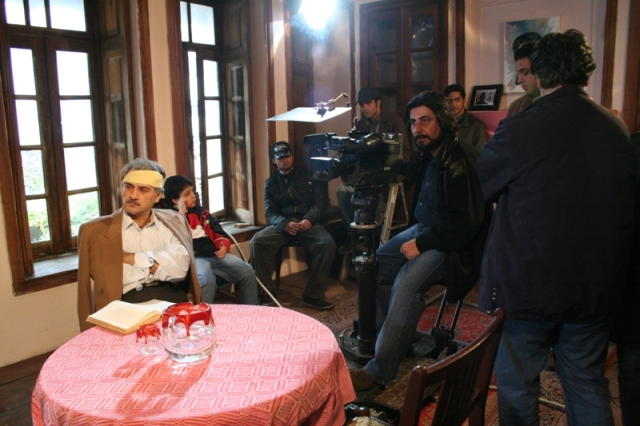
Behind the scenes of the series Empty frames

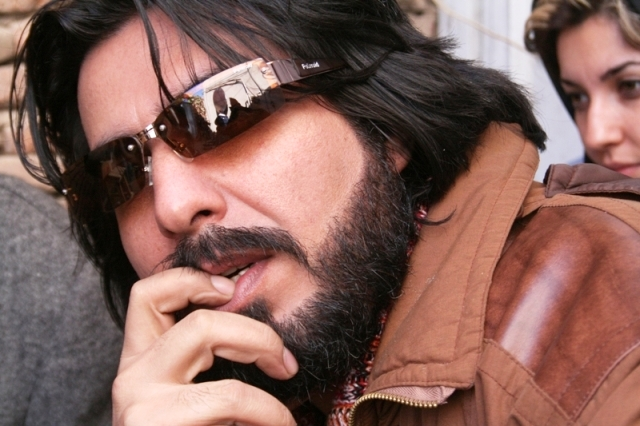
Behind the scenes of the series Empty frames

== See also ==
- Iranian cinema
