= Franziska Baumann =

Swiss musician and composer

Franziska Baumann (born 9 April 1965) is a Swiss musician and composer, specializing in improvisation and composed music (vocals, flute, live electronics). Baumann studied at the Winterthur Conservatory, majoring in flute with a minor in singing. Following her conservatory studies, she completed improvisation classes with Fred Frith, Barre Phillips, and George Lewis. She also studied with vocal artists such as Phil Campanella, Lauren Newton, and Joan La Barbara. As a vocalist, she makes use of extended and microtonal, with clicking and percussive sounds, tone changes and language-related techniques. Baumann performs solo and with musicians including Pierre Favre, Joëlle Léandre, Lê Quan Ninh, Jacques Demierre, Peter Schaerli, and Matthias Ziegler. She is also part of the improvisation trio, Potage du Jour, alongside Jürg Solothurnmann and Christoph Baumann. Her repertoire as a composer ranges from improvised works and electro-acoustic compositions to sound installations and large scale surround sound projects. As Artist in Residence at the Amsterdam Centre For Electro Instrumental Music (STEIM), Baumann programmed a data glove so that she could trigger voice and sound articulations in real time via gesture. Since 2006, Baumann has served as a lecturer in vocal performance and improvisation at the Hochschule der Künste in Bern, where she is also involved in research projects on topics such as sound without body and Gesture performance. Franziska Baumann lives and works in Bern, Switzerland.

== Discography ==
- Tidal Affairs (Leo Records 2010), with Matthias Ziegler
- Voices & Tides (Leo Records 2007), with Matthias Ziegler
- Eternal Ice Melts (soleil moon recordings 2005; Remix by Mick Harris and Clemens Presser)
- Potage du Jour (Leo Records 2005)
- Voice Sphere (Swiss Musicians Association 2002)
- Whisperings, rec rec 2002, with Michel Wintsch, Fred Frith, Bernard Trontin
- Opus 2 with Christian Gilardi, Christian Graf ( Altrisuoni 2002) /
- Road Movie (between the lines in 1998, with Michel Wintsch, Lucas Niggli, Martin Schütz, Gerry Hemingway and others)
- Vocal Suite (Solo, Unit Records 1997)
