= Behrouz Afkhami =

Iranian film director and screenwriter

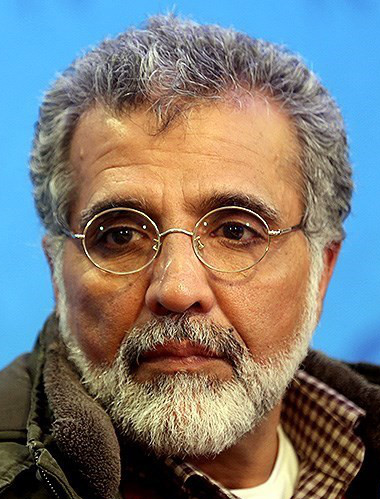
- Behrouz Afkhami at 32nd Fajr International Film Festival

Member of the Parliament of Iran
- In office 26 May 2000 – 27 May 2004
- Constituency: Tehran, Rey, Shemiranat and Eslamshahr
- Majority: 973,727 (33.22%)

Personal details
- Born: October 24, 1956 (age 69) Tehran, Iran
- Party: Islamic Iran Participation Front (until 2009)
- Spouse(s): Nahid Tolou (separated); Marjan Shirmohamadi (current wife)
- Education: Iran Broadcasting University
- Occupation: Film director, screenwriter, executive
- Website: BehroozAfkhami.com

Behrouz Afkhami (Persian: بهروز افخمی; born October 24, 1956) is an Iranian film director and screenwriter. He is known for a style that utilizes point of view camera techniques to portray stories of human drama. He was also member of the Iranian Parliament from 2000 to 2004. He was the host of the third series of the television program, Haft.

== Career and life ==
Behrouz Afkhami has been teaching script writing, directing and editing both privately and in universities since 1989.

== Filmography ==
- The Morning of The Execution, 2023, 90 minutes
- Fox, 2015, 90 minutes
- Azar, Shahdokht, Parviz and Others, 2014, 114 minutes, Super 35 Millimeter
- Saint Petersburg, 2010, 130 minutes, Super 35 Millimeter
- Black Noise, 2011, 85 minutes
- The Son of Dawn, 2006–2009, 110 minutes, Super 35 Millimeter
- The River's End, 2004, 98 minutes, Super 35 Millimeter. Gavkhouni was screened at the Toronto, Brisbane, and Cannes film festivals. It won the South Korean Movie Award and the Catholic Church Award at Brisbane.
- Hemlock, 2000, 86 minutes, Cinemascope. Shokaran broke the Iranian box office record and is one of few Iranian melodramas to be released in the US.
- The World Champion, 1998, 96 minutes, Super 35 Millimeter
- The Day of the Devil, 1995, Super 35 Millimeter
- The Day of the Angel, 1993, Cinemascope
- The Bride, 1991, 90 Minutes, Super 35 Millimeter

== Television series ==
- Thunder and Lightning, 2021, television series
- Operation 125, 2009–2012, television production
- Eleven Minutes, 30 Seconds, 2008, television production, 75 minutes.
- One Hundred & Twenty Five, television production, 12 episodes, 50 minutes each.
- Kouchak Jangli (Rebel in the Jungle), television production series: 10 episodes, 750 minutes total. Based on scripts from Nasser Taghvai.
- More than 10 documentaries for Iranian National Television.

== Director of photography ==
- Under the Rain 1986, 110 minutes, 16 millimeter, Director: Seifollah Daad

== Script writing ==
- The Morning of The Execution, 2023.
- Thunder and Lightning, 2021, television series
- Child of the Dawn, 2011.
- Eleven Minutes 30 Seconds, 2008.
- One Hundred and Twenty Five, 2006.
- The River's End, 2004.
- Hemlock, 2000.
- The World Champion, 1998.
- The Day of the Devil, 1995, adaptation of Fredrich Forside's book “Fourth Protocol”.
- The Day of the Angel, 1993.
- The Bride, 1991, co-writer Alireza Davoodnejad.
- Kouchak Jangli (Rebel in the Jungle).
- Manuscripts, directed by Mehrzad Minoui.
- 53 Men, directed by Yousef Seyed Mahdavi.

== Film editing ==
- Don't put Mud in the Spring, 1989.
- Quarantine, 2007.
- Gavkhouni (The River's End), 2004.
- Eleven Minutes 30 Seconds, 2008.

== Television host ==
- Haft Third series

== Published books ==
- Volcanic Core of Cinema (Anthology), year unknown.

== Teaching ==
- Tehran University of Art
- Faculty of Visual Arts, University of Tehran
- Faculty of TV & Radio in cooperation with the National Broadcasting Company
- Private institutes in Iran and Canada

== Awards ==
- Crystal Simorgh for Best Director in Fajr Film Festival (The Morning of The Execution, 2024)
- Crystal Simorgh for Best Film in Fajr Film Festival (Azar, Shahdokht, Parviz and Others, 2014)
- Crystal Simorgh for Best Screenplay in Fajr Film Festival (Azar, Shahdokht, Parviz and Others, 2014)
- Honorary Diploma for Best Director in Fajr Film Festival (The Bride, 1991)
- Special Jury Award Fajr Film Festival for Best Director
- South Korean Movie Award for Best Director
- Netpac Award Brisbane International Film Festival for Best Motion Picture
