= Cinema Farhang =

Movie theater in Tehran, Iran

Coordinates: 35°46′35″N 51°26′10″E

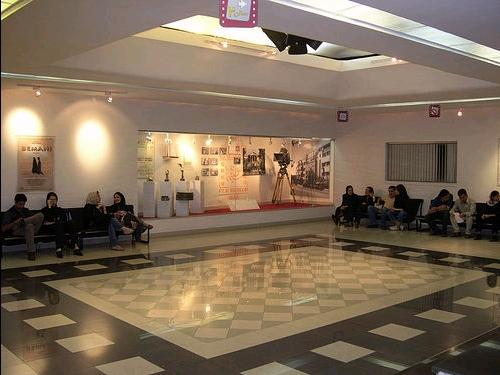
Cinema Farhang

Cinema Farhang (Persian: سینما فرهنگ) is a movie theater in Tehran in Iran. It is one of the official theaters that plays foreign films in Tehran.
