= Bahram Radan =

Iranian actor and singer (born 1979)

- بهرام رادان
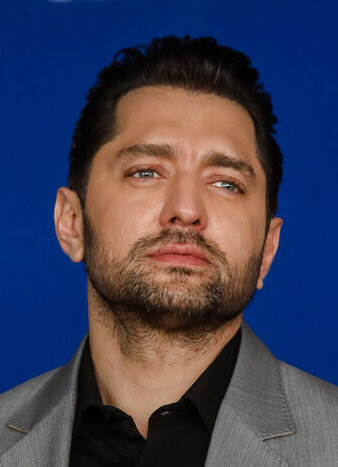
- Radan at the Fajr Film Festival 2022
- Born: April 28, 1979 (age 46); Tehran, Iran
- Education: Islamic Azad University
- Occupation: Actor
- Spouse: Mina Mokhtari (m. 2023)
- Children: 1
- Musical career
- Years active: 1999–present
- Website: bahramradan.com

Bahram Radan (Persian: بهرام رادان; born April 28, 1979) is an Iranian actor. He has received various accolades, including two Crystal Simorgh and a Hafez Award.

== Career ==
While studying business management in college, Radan signed up for acting classes where he was discovered as an emerging talent. He got his first break when he was given an opportunity for his first role starring in the movie The Passion of Love. The movie achieved great success at the Iranian box office and was one of the top-grossing movies of 2000. Radan has since starred in many movies and has become a popular household name in the Middle East, often referred to as one of the top five superstars of Iranian cinema. His extreme popularity caused Iranian authorities to ban his images from billboards in 2008. In 2010, he was chosen by United Nations as the first Iranian UN ambassador against hunger.

He ventured into music and released his first album, The Other Side, in 2012. Music videos were created for three of the songs from the album: "Jeegh" (Scream), "To Rafti" (You Left) and "Zamouneh" (Era).

In June 2015, Radan tweeted support (in Persian) for the U.S. Supreme Court's decision legalizing gay marriage, and was compelled to delete the Tweet and forced to apologize after criticism from government-affiliated hardline media. Although The Guardian could not independently verify the claim, Iranian media reported that Radan had been summoned for questioning before the country's Ministry of Culture and Islamic Guidance, which vets films and cultural materials before their release.

In 2008, Radan acted in Tardid which is based on William Shakespeare's Hamlet. After that, he was "Zaal" in "Iran C project theatre“.

== Filmography ==
=== Film ===
Year	Title	Role	Director	Notes	Ref(s)
2001	The Passion of Love	Kian	Nader Moghaddas		
2001	Blue	Arastoo	Hamid Labkhandeh		
2001	Swan Song	Peyman Fadayi	Saeed Asadi	Nominated – Hafez Award for Best Actor Motion Picture	
2001	Dark Rising		Ebrahim Sheibani	Short film	
2002	Bartender	Reza Tehrani	Mohamad Reza A'alami		
2002	Thirst	Ashkan	Mohammad Hossein Farahbakhsh		
2003	The Yellow Rose	Davood	Dariush Farhang		
2003	The River's End	Khashayar	Behrouz Afkhami	Nominated – Hafez Award for Best Actor Motion Picture	
2004	Friday's Soldiers	Asef	Masoud Kimiai		
2004	A Candle in the Wind	Farzin Zarban	Pouran Derakhshandeh	Won – Crystal Simorgh Fajr Film Festival Award for Best Actor	
2004	Gilaneh	Esmaeel	Mohsen Abdolvahab		
2005	The Pink Marriage	Aria Shadab	Manouchehr Mosayyeri		
2005	Salvation at 8:20	Taha Rahmani	Sirus Alvand		
2005	The Command	Sahand	Masoud Kimiai		
2006	Crossroads	Pedram	Abolhassan Davoodi		
2006	Mainline	Arash	Rakhshan Banietemad, Mohsen Abdolvahab	Cameo	
2007	The Music Man	Ali Boloorchi	Dariush Mehrjui	Won – Crystal Simorgh Fajr Film Festival Award for Best Actor	
2007	Four Finger	Foad / Farzad	Saeed Soheili		
2008	Canaan	Ali Rezvan	Mani Haghighi		
2009	Penniless	Iraj	Hamid Nematollah		
2009	Doubt	Siavash	Varuzh Karim Masihi		
2009	Motherland	Amir Ali	Abolhassan Davoodi		
2010	The Killer	Maziar Mafi	Reza Karimi	Won – Ladakh International Film Festival Award for Best Actor	
2010	Death Carnival	Hamid Jahanbakhsh	Reza Azamian, Habibollah Kasesaz		
2011	Principles	Babak Saman	Tahmineh Milani		
2011	The Maritime Silk Road	Shazan	Mohammad Bozorgnia		
2012	Tehran 2121	Javad (voice)	Bahram Azimi		
2012	The Wooden Bridge	Amir	Mehdi Karampour		
2014	Tragedy	Habib	Azita Moguie		
2014	Negar's Role	Farzad	Ali Atshani		
2014	Cease Fire 2	Khosrow	Tahmineh Milani	Nominated – Hafez Award for Best Actor Motion Picture	
2015	Ice Age	Farid	Mostafa Kiaee		
2015	A Tale of Love	Ali	Ahmad Ramezanzadeh		
2016	Barcode	Hamed	Mostafa Kiaee	Nominated – Hafez Award for Best Actor Motion Picture	
2016	Polaris	Poorya	Soudabeh Moradian		
2017	Yellow	Shahab	Mostafa Taghizadeh		
2018	Istanbul Junction	Bahman	Mostafa Kiaee		
2019	Tsunami	Morteza Nezhadi	Milad Sadrameli	Won – Iran International FICTS Festival Award for Best National Actor in a Feature Film	
2019	Mastermind	Saeed Parsa	Azita Moguie		
2019	The Agitation	Bardia / Barbod	Fereydoun Jeyrani		
2020	The Black Cat	Bahram Radan	Karim Mohammad Amini	also as producer	
2021	Pinto	Jalal	Narges Abyar		
2022	Grassland		Kazem Daneshi	as producer Nominated – Crystal Simorgh Fajr Film Festival Award for Best Film	
2024	Breakfast with Giraffes	Mojtaba	Soroush Sehhat	Nominated – Hafez Award for Best Actor Motion Picture	

=== Web ===
Year	Title	Role	Director	Platform	Ref(s)
2019	Dance on the Glass	Yaghma Namdar	Mehdi Golestaneh	Video CD	
2022–2023	Jeyran	Naser al-Din Shah Qajar	Hassan Fathi	Filimo	
2025	Azaazil		Hassan Fathi	Namava	
TBA	1001 Nights		Mostafa Kiaee	Filimo	

== Awards and nominations ==
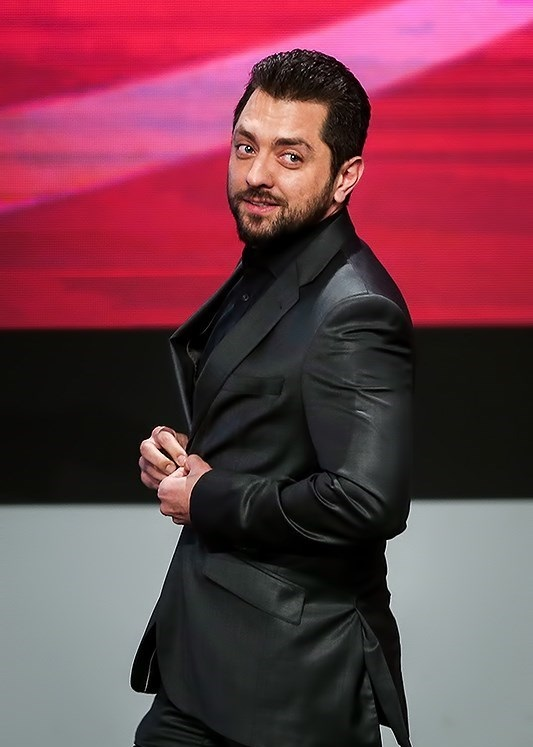
Bahram Radan at the 35th Fajr Film Festival

- Best Actor, Ladakh International Film Festival, India (LIFF) for "The Killer", 2012
- "Young Artist of the Decade" Award, Best Artist of the Decade, 2007
- Crystalline Roc Award (Best Actor in a Leading Role) for "Santoori (The Music Man)", 25th Fajr Film Festival (The only actor under 30 years of age having won 2 Crystalline Roc Awards), 2007
- Paramount Male Youth of the Year, National Youth Magazine (40 Cheragh), 2006
- Nominated in "Cinema Home" Yearly Awards (Best Actor in a Leading Role) for "Candle in the Wind", 2001
- Crystalline Roc Award (Best Actor in a Leading Role) for "Candle in the Wind", 22nd Fajr Film Festival (The youngest actor receiving a Crystalline Roc Award), 2004
- Hafiz Statuette Award (Best Actor) for "River's End", 7th Picture World Festival, 2004
- Paramount Male Youth of the Year, National Youth Organization, 2004
- First Iranian star attending Cannes Film Festival’s Red Carpet, 2004
- Family Films Festival Award (Best Actor in a Leading Role) for "Swan's Cry", 2001
- Nominated in "Cinema Home" Yearly Awards (Best Actor in a Leading Role) for "Swan's Cry", 2001
- Nominated for Hafiz Statuette Award (Best Actor) for "Swan's Cry”

== See also ==
- Iranian cinema
- List of Iranian actors
