= Faghiheh Soltani =

Iranian actress

Faghiheh Soltani فقیهه سلطانی
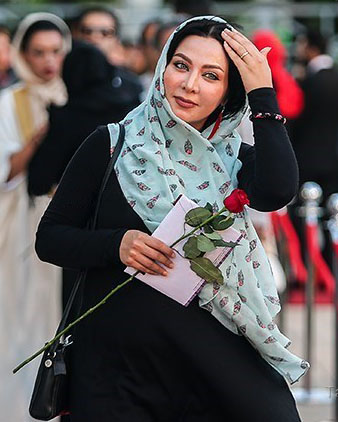
- Photo of Faghiheh Soltani at 16th Hafez Awards
- Born: 20 August 1974 (age 51); Hamedan, Iran
- Occupation: Actress
- Spouse: Jalal Omidian

Faghiheh Soltani (Persian: فقیهه سلطانی) is an Iranian actress.

== Biography ==
Soltani was born in Hamedan in 1974, and studied drama at Islamic Azad University. She took acting lessons with Golab Adineh. She made her acting debut in 1995, appearing in the film The Blue Veiled by acclaimed director Rakhshan Bani-Etemad. Since then, she has appeared in many films and TV series. Among her notable films are Soorati (2003) by Fereydoun Jeyrani, Sunglasses (1999), and The Miracle of Laughter by Yadollah Samadi. She was nominated for the Crystal Simorgh for Best Actress for the latter role, but eventually lost to Golchehreh Sajadiye.

She is married to Iranian footballer Jalal Omidian.
