= Farhad Aslani =

Iranian actor

- فرهاد اصلانی
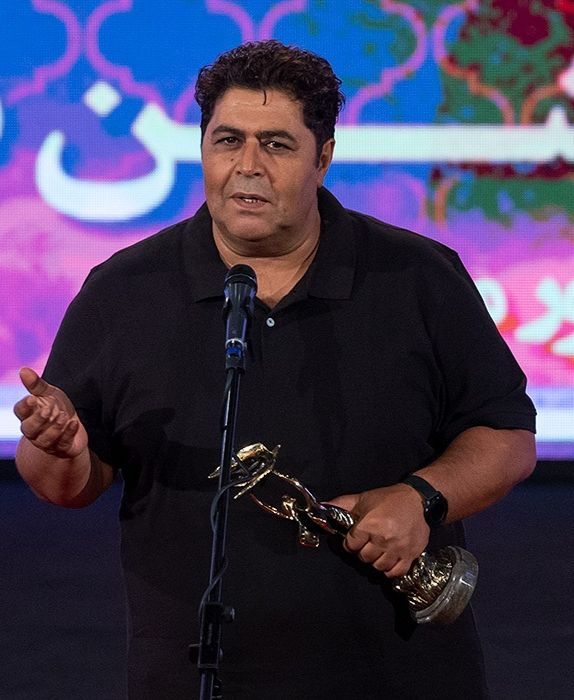
- Born: June 8, 1966 (age 60); Bijar, Iran
- Occupation: Actor
- Years active: 1979–present
- Spouse: Mojdeh Daneshpajooh
- Children: 1

Farhad Aslani (Persian: فرهاد اصلانی; born June 8, 1966) is an Iranian actor.

== Early life and career ==
Aslani was born to a Kurdish family in Bijar, Kurdistan; Although he grew up in Tehran, and was recognized for his impersonation skills at an early age. Aslani played his first role in The Blue-Veiled by Rakhshan Bani Etemad in 1995. Aslani won Crystal Simorgh for illustrious played his role in Private Life movie at the Fajr Film Festival 2012. Aslani in 2011 played the Different role of Ibn Ziyad in Mokhtarnameh TV series. He played at the Daughter movie by Reza Mir-Karimi and won the Best Actor Award at Moscow International Film Festival 2016. He won the IFFI Best Actor Award (Male) at the 47th International Film Festival of India.

== Controversy ==
=== Allegations of sexual misconduct ===
On 23 March 2022, assistant director Somaye Mirshamsi stated on Twitter that she had been "sexually harassed" and "violently treated" by Farhad Aslani while working on a film directed by Hatef Alimardani. At the time of the incident, Aslani was allegedly and "took her hand and asked Ms. Mirshamsi to kiss his face". Avazeh Shahnaz, a filmmaker and director, also said that she had a "similar experience" with Aslani. On 28 March 2022, the Tehran Association of Film Assistant Directors issued a statement, emphasizing Mirshamsi's "honesty", and added "This is not the first time that psychological insecurity and even physical threats and confrontations have taken place behind the scenes of the Iranian film industry, and in order to eradicate this inhumane practice, radical, serious and inter-union coordination is needed. The allegations were subsequently reviewed by a court, which acquitted Farhad Aslani of the charges. "

== Filmography ==
=== Cinema ===
- The Blue Veiled 1995
- Safar be Chazabeh 1996
- Bashgah-e Seri 2000
- Asemane Por Setareh 2000
- Movie Mania 2000
- Ghoroob Shod, Bia 2004
- Istgahe Behesht 2006
- The Reward of Silence 2007
- End of the road 2007
- Heiran 2009
- Thirteen 59 2011
- A Cube of Sugar 2011
- I am a Mother 2012
- Private Life 2012
- The Bear 2012
- The Wooden Bridge 2012
- Be Khatreh Pooneh 2013
- Tales 2014
- Dreamy 2014
- Sakene Tabaghe ye Vasat 2014
- Mastaneh 2014
- Kalashnikov 2014
- Ice Age 2015
- Time of Love 2015
- The Nameless Alley 2016
- Daughter 2016
- Under the Smoky Roof 2017
- Beautiful Jinn 2017
- Sheeple 2018
- Columbus 2018
- Just 6.5 2019
- Playing with Stars 2021
- Leila's Brothers 2022
- Falling House 2026

=== TV series ===
- The Monster
- Rebel
- King of Ear
- Mokhtarnameh
- Rahe Bipayan (Endless Path)
- Vafa
- Khane Dar Tariki
- Police Javan
- Dastane Yek Shar
- The English Briefcase
- Pezeshkan
- Khaterate Yek Khabarnegar
- Safar Be Chazzabeh
- Kharere Ha
- Cheshe-e-Sevom
- Khane Dar Atash
- Baharan Dar Bahar
- Hamsaye Ha
- Imam Ali

=== Telefilm ===
- Shakh Be Shakh
