= Roozegar-e Gharib =

Iranian TV series (2007)

- Also known as: Gharib's Story
- روزگار قریب
- Created by: Kianoush Ayari
- Starring: Mehdi Hashemi; Naser Hashemi; Shahab Kasraei; Mehran Rajabi; Reza Kianian; Bahram Ziraksari Hossein Panahi; Reza Fayazi; Afshin Sangchap; Kaveh Ahangar; Parham Karami
- Country of origin: Iran
- Original language: Persian
- No. of episodes: 36

Production
- Running time: Approximately 60 minutes

Original release
- Network: Channel 3 (Iran)
- Release: October 20, 2007

Roozegar-e Gharib (Persian: روزگار قریب, lit. 'the Times of Gharib') is an Iranian TV series about Dr. Mohammad Gharib, the father of Pediatrics in Iran directed by Kianoush Ayari.

== Story ==
Ayyari wrote the script and the film reveals the story of Dr. Gharib's life from his childhood to the death. It also deals with History of Iran during 1905–1975.

== Properties ==
Filming began at the end of 2002 and ended in the fall of 2007.

- Time: 36 episodes, each episode 60 minutes approximately.

== First role performers ==
Five actors act in the role of Dr. Gharib from his childhood to the elderness. Parham Karami, Kaveh Ahangar, Shahab Kasraie, Naser Hashemi, and Mehdi Hashemi act in the first role of the Series.

== Cast and crews ==
- Mehdi Hashemi: Old Dr. Gharib
- Naser Hashemi: Adult Dr. Gharib
- Shahab Kasraei: Young Dr. Gharib
- Kaveh Ahangar: Dr. Gharib at the age of 12
- Parham Karami: Dr. Gharib at the age of 7
- Mehran Rajabi: Dr. Gharib's father
- Afarin Obeysi: Dr. Gharib's wife
- Hossein Panahi: Lotf-Ali
- Reza Kianian: Ayatollah Firoozabadi
- Farahnaz Manafi Zaher: Dr. Gharib's Mother
- Reza Babak: Mehdi Bazargan
- Amir Hossein Seddigh: Seyyed Ahmad Tabib
- Saba Kamali: Seyyed Ahmad Tabib's wife
- Reza Fayazi: Dr.Fotohi
- Afshin Sangchap:Uncle Dr. Gharib
- Maryam Soltani: Afrashteh (Mother of Shaden)
- Susan Parvar
- Mir-Taher Mazloomi
- Saeed Shahram: Composer
