= Mohammad Gharib =

Iranian pediatrician (1909–1975)

Mohammad Gharib محمد قریب
- Born: 5 July 1909; Tehran, Sublime State of Iran
- Died: 20 January 1975 (aged 65); Tehran, Imperial State of Iran
- Occupations: Pediatrician; University Professor
- Spouse: Zahra Gharib
- Children: Hossein Gharib, Maryam, Nahid & Mohsen

Mohammad Gharib (Persian: محمد قریب; 5 July 1909 – 20 January 1975) was an Iranian physician, clinician, university professor and a pioneer of pediatrics in Iran.

Gharib is known as the father of pediatrics in Iran. He was a graduate of University of Paris Medical School.

== Life and achievements ==
Gharib was born in Tehran, Iran, into a family from Tafresh, on 5 July 1909.

After completing high school in 1927, he went to Reims, France, where he studied at École de Médecine de Reims for 2 years and then enrolled at the Paris University Medical School. An honor student at the medical school, he passed the difficult examinations for an externship and later those for the coveted and highly competitive interne des hôpitaux de Paris. He received an M.D. degree in 1937 and, after one year of training in pediatrics with Professor Ribadeau-Dumas at Salpêtrière Hospital in Paris, he returned home. On his return to Iran, Gharib was appointed the first professor of pediatrics at University of Tehran by Dr. Charles Oberling, a French educator who was dean of the medical school.

Subsequently, Gharib became chairman of the pediatrics department, a post he held until his death in 1975. In 1941, he was the author of the first Persian textbook on diseases of children. Throughout his career, he edited or co edited numerous volumes on pediatric problems and progress in Iran, and published many articles in Persian, French, and American medical journals. He also maintained a thriving pediatrics practice that usually focused on problem cases.

During a span of 37 years, Gharib taught the medicine of childhood to thousands of undergraduate and graduate students. Many of his pupils subsequently held important positions in Iranian medical education, including the chairmanship of most of the pediatrics departments in the numerous medical schools in Iran. Because of his endeavors and influence, the field was recognized as a specialty in 1950 and a Pediatrics Specialty Board was created in 1955. In 1960, he and his colleagues founded the Iranian Pediatrics Society, of which he was president until 1974. He was a member of the Advisory Board of the International Pediatrics Association from 1968 to 1974. In 1970, he was instrumental in the planning and building of the 150-bed Children's Hospital Medical Center in Tehran, and he served as its medical director from 1971 to 1975.

Gharib was respected as an effective, colorful, and extremely popular teacher by his students; recognized as a superb clinician by his colleagues; and regarded as a dedicated physician by his patients. He was an influential figure in modern Iranian medicine and regarded by the medical community as the "Father of Iranian Pediatrics". In recognition of his impressive achievements, the French government conferred on him the Cross of the Chevalier de la Légion d'honneur (Legion of Honour) in 1954. The American magazine M.D., in a series of articles on prominent physicians worldwide, featured Gharib of Iran in its May 1965 issue. Every year, his colleagues and the Iranian Pediatric Society commemorate him by a week long seminar entitled "Doctor Gharib Memorial Pediatric Conference" as a postgraduate course in pediatrics.

In 1972, Gharib underwent surgical treatment and radiotherapy for bladder carcinoma. He died of recurrent cancer in Tehran on 20 January 1975.

During a summer trip to Tehran in 1935, he met and married Zahra (Zari) Gharib, daughter of Ostad Abdolazim Gharib, a university professor and Persian language expert. Gharib and his wife Zari had four children: Nahid, Maryam, Hossein, and Mohsen, and ten grandchildren all of whom live in the U.S.: Niloofar, Parinaz, Fatemeh, Ameneh, Soheyla, Mohammad, Yasaman, Mahmood, Kimya, and Ali.

After the 1979 Iranian Revolution, Zari Gharib moved initially to France, and later to U.S., where she died in 2009 and was buried in Virginia. Hossein Gharib is a famous endocrinologist at the Mayo Clinic in Rochester, MN, Mohsen Gharib a practicing radiologist in Washington, D.C., Niloofar Ziai, an ophthalmologist in Virginia, and Mahmood Gharib, a physical medicine physician at the University of Minnesota in Minneapolis, MN.

For his lifetime of service, he was honored on a stamp issued by Iran on 10 October 1991. His personal, professional, and political life, detailed in a 36-part television series entitled "Roozegar-e Gharib" or "Times of Gharib," was first shown on Iranian TV in 2007 and twice more, due to popular demand. A biography of his life and work, "Yadnameh Dr. Mohammad Gharib," was prepared in Persian by his son, Hossein Gharib, and published in Iran in 1998. In 2021, Dr. Hadi Bahar and Dr. Hossein Gharib, prepared "Mohammad Gharib, MD: His Inspiring Life & Legacy," a book in Persian language highlighting his medical education in France, his significant contributions to pediatrics in his country, his lasting legacy as an inspiring medical teacher and educator in modern Iran, his long service as a compassionate doctor, and his impact as a political activist, and a man of arts, literature and religion.

== Family ==
His parents were both from the village Garakan in Tafresh. He was a first degree cousin to the linguist Badr al-Zamān Qarīb (Badrozaman Gharib) and son-in-law of Ostad Abdolazim Gharib.

== Honors ==
- Advisory Board of the International Pediatrics Association
- Father of Iranian Pediatrics

== TV series ==
Roozegar-e Gharib (Gharib's Story) is the name of an Iranian TV Series which was made describing his life from childhood to death. It was directed by Kianoush Ayari.

Gharib is a recipient of the Legion of Honour, see List of foreign recipients of the Légion d'Honneur by country.

== See also ==
- Science in Iran
- University of Tehran
