= Shahram Lasemi =

- شهرام لاسمی
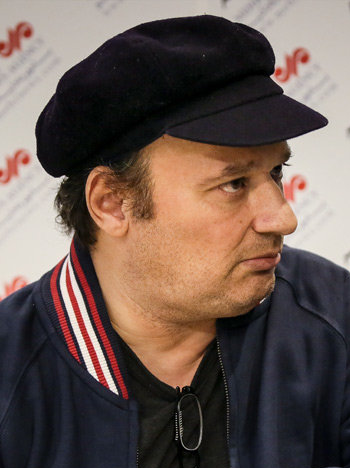
- Lasemi in November 2017
- Born: December 17, 1964 (age 61); Tehran, Iran
- Occupation: Actor
- Spouse: Atefeh Pazouki

Shahram Lasemi (شهرام لاسمی; born 17 December 1964 in Tehran) is an Iranian actor best known for portraying the television character Ghelgheli.

His first appearance on television came at the age of 21, on the recommendation of Farimah Farjami, in a children's program titled Play, Joy, Watch (Bazi, Shadi, Tamasha). He began his artistic career with the television theatre production Dreams of Ehtikar al-Sultan and later appeared in several televised plays. Following these performances, he was invited to join the children and youth department of Channel 2 to act in the regular children's show Play, Joy, Watch.

In August 2025, during an interview with actor Majid Vashegani, Lasemi spoke about the difficulties of his childhood and adolescence. He revealed that after his parents separated, his mother placed him under both financial and emotional pressure, even threatening to deny him entry to their home if he did not hand over his income. Lasemi was 14 years old at the time of the Iranian Revolution in 1979. He described the atmosphere at home during that period as deeply turbulent, a crisis which he said was visible not only within his family but also throughout the wider society. He added that even at the height of his fame he lived in poverty, beginning his married life with his wife in a small room in southern Tehran.

== Filmography ==
- Shangoul and Mangoul (1989)
- Atal Matal Tutule (1991)
- Three Ordinary Men (1993)
- Sindbad and Sara (2014)
- City of Ordibehesht (2017)
