= Sugar cubes (disambiguation) =

Sugar cubes are white granulated sugar pressed together into block shapes that are used to sweeten drinks

Sugar cubes may also refer:

- The Sugarcubes, a rock-pop band from Iceland
- A Cube of Sugar, a 2011 Iranian film
