= Saeed Poursamimi =

Iranian actor

- سعید پورصمیمی
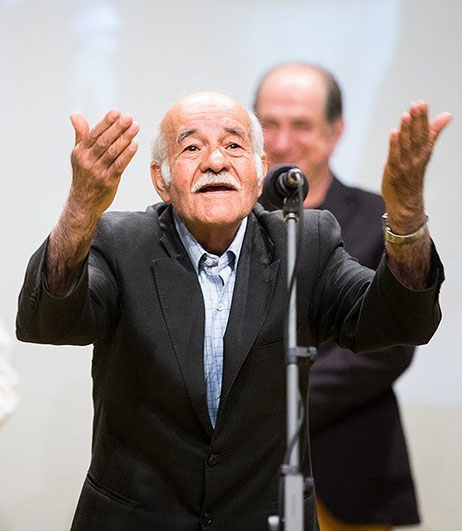
- Poursamimi at the 2015 Iranian Cinema Celebration
- Born: February 29, 1944 (age 82); Tehran, Iran
- Occupation: Actor
- Years active: 1950-1990

Saeed Poursamimi (Persian: سعید پورصمیمی; born February 29, 1944) is an Iranian actor. He has received various accolades, including three Crystal Simorgh for Best Supporting Actor, making him the only actor to have three wins in that category. Poursamimi is best known as the master of supporting roles in Iran.

== Filmography ==
=== Film ===
Year	Title	Role	Director	Notes	Ref(s)
1950	Love				
1987	Captain Khorshid	Malool	Nasser Taghvai	Won – Crystal Simorgh Fajr Film Festival Award for Best Supporting Actor	
1988	The Presents	Tavassol	Ebrahim Vahidzadeh	Won – Crystal Simorgh Fajr Film Festival Award for Best Supporting Actor	
1989	Hey, Joe!	Jafar Panahi	Manouchehr Asgari Nasab		
1989	Until Sunset		Jafar Vali		
1991	The Last Act	Jami	Varuzh Karim Masihi	Won – Crystal Simorgh Fajr Film Festival Award for Best Supporting Actor	
1991	The Old Men's School		Ali Sajadi Hosseini		
1992	Love-stricken	Naser Khan Deilaman	Ali Hatami		
1993	The Abadanis	Darvish	Kianoush Ayari		
1996	Face	Gholamreza Moravat	Sirus Alvand		
1997	Land of the Sun		Ahmad Reza Darvish	Nominated – Crystal Simorgh Fajr Film Festival Award for Best Supporting Actor	
1998	Jahan Pahlavan Takhti		Ali Hatami, Behrouz Afkhami	Cameo	
1999	Beauty and the Beast		Ahmad Reza Motamedi	Nominated – Crystal Simorgh Fajr Film Festival Award for Best Supporting Actor	
1999	The Afflicted Generation	Shazdeh	Rasoul Mollagholipour		
1999	Taher's Love		Mohammad Ali Najafi		
1999	Iran Is My Land	Worker	Parviz Kimiavi		
2000	Bride of Fire	The Lawyer	Khosrow Sinai		
2003	Here, a Shining Light		Reza Mirkarimi	Nominated – Iran Cinema Celebration Award for Best Supporting Actor	
2003	Fever	Yar Mohammad	Reza Karimi		
2004	Equation	Ali Morad	Ebrahim Vahidzadeh	Nominated – Crystal Simorgh Fajr Film Festival Award for Best Supporting Actor	
2007	Lonesome Trees	Roshan	Saeed Ebrahimifar	Nominated – Crystal Simorgh Fajr Film Festival Award for Best Actor	
2007	The Rules of the Game	Esrafil Khan Zargandeh	Ahmad Reza Motamedi		
2011	A Cube of Sugar	Ezattolah Rasoulian	Reza Mirkarimi		
2012	Kissing the Moon-Like Face	Mash Ghorban	Homayoun As'adian		
2016	In Silence	Khosrow	Zharzh Hashemzadeh		
2017	Maybe It Wasn’t Love		Saeed Ebrahimifar		
2017	Leaf of Life	Rahim	Ebrahim Mokhtari		
2018	Columbus	Heshmat Ali Khan Monfared	Hatef Alimardani	Nominated – Hafez Award for Best Actor Motion Picture	
2020	Amphibious	Ebrahim	Borzou Niknejad		
2020	Intoxicated Eye	Mosiu Khachik	Jalal al-Din Dori		
2022	Leila's Brothers	Esmail Jourablou	Saeed Roustaee	Selected to compete for the Palme d'Or at the 2022 Cannes Film Festival	
2024	Parviz Khan	Parviz Dehdari	Ali Saghafi	Nominated – Hafez Award for Best Actor Motion Picture	

=== Television ===
Year	Title	Role	Director	Notes	Network	Ref(s)
1974	Soltan-e Sahebgharan		Ali Hatami	TV series	NIRT	
1978	Five Plays		Forouhar Khorshahi	TV series		
1995	Under Your Protection	Reza Mansouri	Hamid Labkhandeh	TV series	IRIB TV2	
1996	Life		Mohammad Reza A'alami	TV series		
2003	Street Kids		Homayoun As'adian	TV series	IRIB TV5	
2004	One Night of Nights		Reza Karimi	TV series		
2008	The Address		Rambod Javan	TV series	IRIB TV2	
2009	Honeymoon	Khan Baba	Shahed Ahmadlo	TV series	IRIB TV2	
2011	The Family Conspiracy	Mr. Salari	Rambod Javan	TV series	IRIB TV1	
2013	Garlic and Vinegar	Soltan	Gholamreza Ramazani	TV series	IRIB TV2	
2013	We're Still Alive		Kazem Balouchi	TV film	IRIB TV1	
