= Mehran Rajabi =

Iranian actor (born 1961)

- مهران رجبی
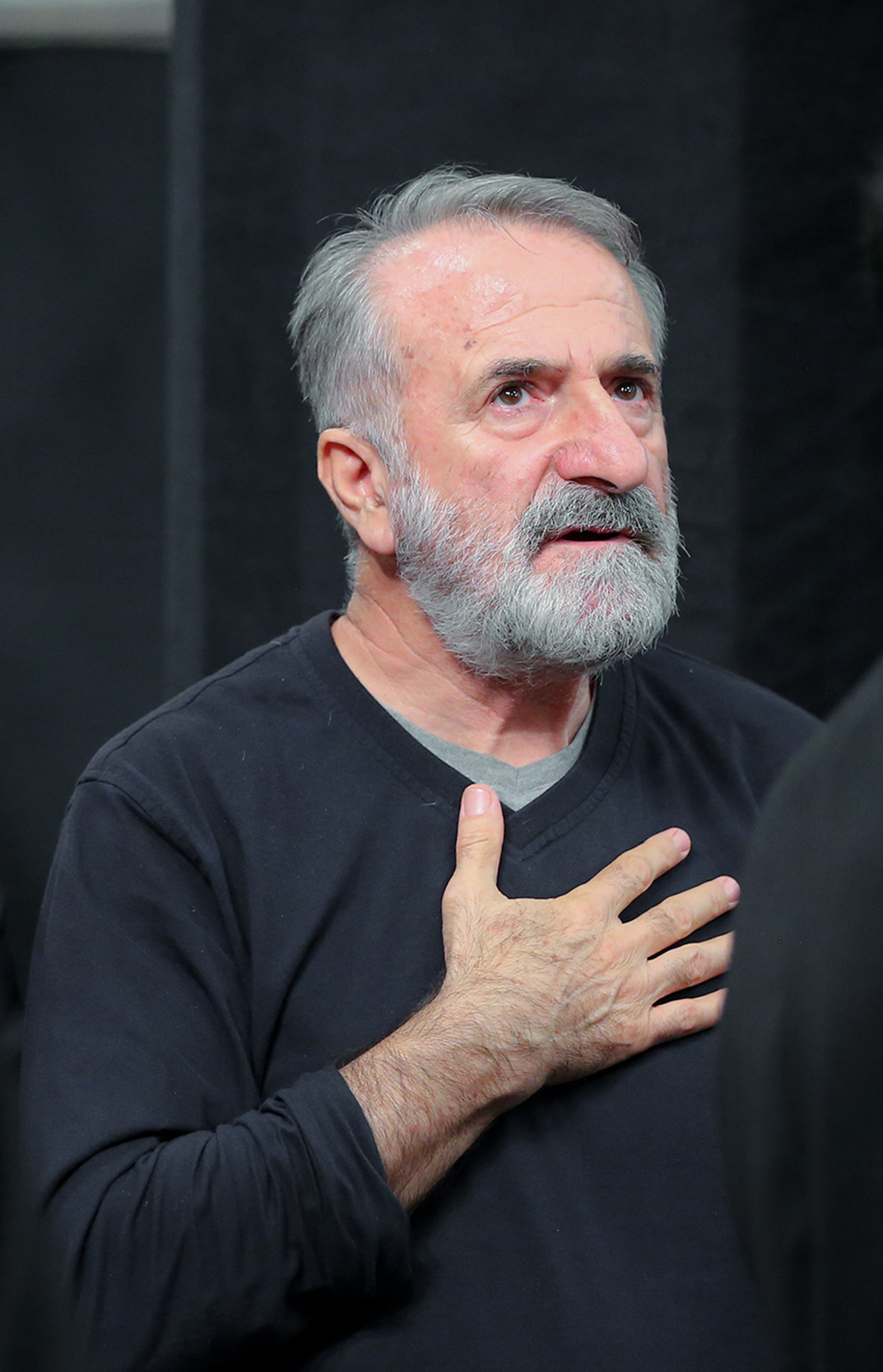
- Mehran Rajabi in 2024
- Born: 31 December 1961 (age 64); Varian, Karaj County, Iran
- Occupation: Actor

Mehran Rajabi مهران عقبی یا (Persian: مهران رجبی; born December 31, 1961, in Karaj County) is an Iranian actor.

He is originally from the village of Varian, Chalous Road, Iran, and his father was a gardener and farmer. He experienced his first appearance in front of the camera in 1997 in the TV series "Hemmat School Kids". His first presence in Iranian cinema was in front of Reza Mirkarimi's camera in "The Child and the Soldier". He had COVID-19 in September 2020, and for this reason he was hospitalized for a few days in a hospital in Zanjan, and rumors were circulating that his general condition was deteriorating. He was finally released from the hospital after 15 days and mentioned this on his Instagram page.

== Filmography ==
- Tweezers
- Blade and Termeh
- Taboo
- The Lizard
- Three Women
- Ekhrajiha 2
- Deldadeh
- Koudak va sarbaz
- Kolah too Kolah
- Doctors' Building
- Bachelors
- Flying Passion
- Soorati
- Divorce Iranian Style
- Zirzamin
- Roozegar-e Gharib
- The Paternal House
