= Rahman Seifi Azad =

Iranian filmmaker

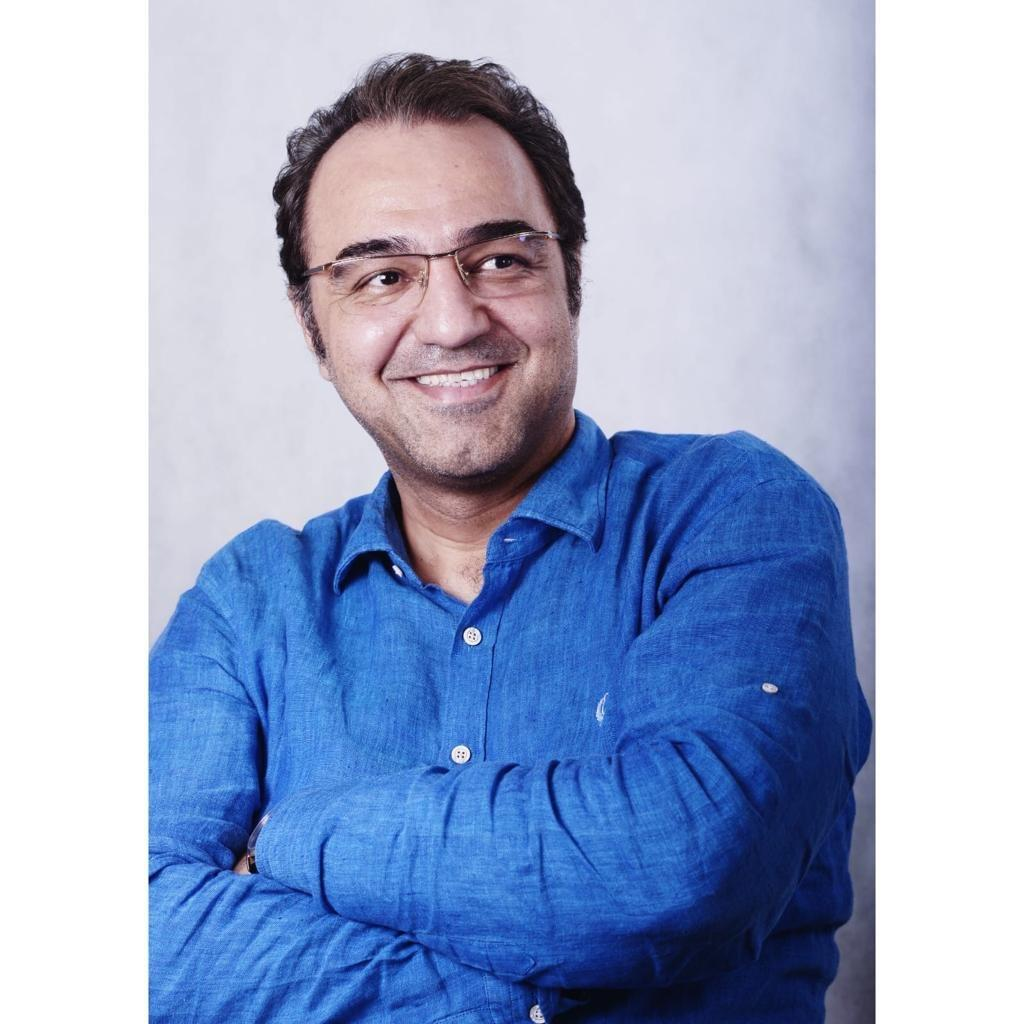
- Born: 1973 (age 52–53); Tehran, Iran
- Occupations: Producer, Writer, Playwright
- Years active: 1993– Present

Rahman Seifi Azad (Persian: رحمان سیفی آزاد; born 1973) is a producer, screenwriter and director who works in cinema, television and theater.

== Biography ==
In 2004 he received a master's degree in Dramatic Literature from the Fine Arts Campus of the University of Tehran.

Due to his interest in arts and especially in theatre and television production, he established and launched the TV program Do Qadam Mande Be Sobh [translated as "Two Steps Remaining to the morning"] broadcast on Shabake Chahar Sima [an Iranian TV Channel] during 2007. Then he produced and launched another TV program named "Theater Magazine" also broadcast on Shabake Chahar Sima during 2009. He then created, designed and edited many other programs for TV, including “Chashm-e Shab-e Roshan” [translated as “The Eyes of the Bright Knight”].

Among his achievements is the play Taklif, published by Monadi-e Tarbiat Cultural Institute, winning the second national playwriting competition of Ayeneh Tarbiat in 1998.

== Filmography ==
=== Cinema ===
| Year | Title in Persian | Title in English | Role | Director |
|---|---|---|---|---|
| 2010 | من مادر هستم | I am a mother | Writer | Fereydoun Jeyrani |
| 2010 | قصه پریا | A Fairy Tale | Writer | Fereydoun Jeyrani |
| 2013 | خواب زدها | Dreamy | Writer, producer | Fereydoun Jeyrani |
| 2016 | ماجان | Majan | Director | Rahman Seifi Azad |
| 2020 | الماس | Diamond | Producer | Hojat Ghasemzadeh Asl |

=== Television series ===
| Year | Title in Persian | Title in English | Role | Director |
| 2020 | ملکه گدایان | Queen of Beggars | Producer | Hossein Soheili Zadeh |
| 2020 | گیسو (عاشقانه ۲) | Chignon | Art consultant | Manouchehr Hadi |
