= Gilaneh (film) =

2004 Iranian film

- Directed by: Rakhshān Banietemad; Mohsen Abdulvahab
- Written by: Rakhshān Banietemad; Farid Mostafavi; Mohsen Abdulvahab
- Produced by: Saeed Saadi
- Starring: Fatemeh Motamed-Arya; Bahram Radan; Baran Kosari; Zhaleh Sameti; Shahrokh Foroutanian; Majid Bahrami; Nireh Farahani
- Cinematography: Morteza Poursamadi
- Edited by: Davood Yousefian
- Distributed by: Omid Film
- Release date: 5 October 2005
- Running time: 90 minutes
- Country: Iran
- Language: Persian
- Box office: 112,000,000 Tomans (Tehran)

Gilaneh (Persian: گیلانه) is a 2004 film by Rakhshān Banietemad and Mohsen Abdulvahab. The film was nominated for three Crystal Simorghs at the Fajr Film Festival, which won Simorgh for Best Make-up and a Special Jury Prize, and Fatemeh Motamed-Arya, nominated for Crystal Simorgh for Best Actress.

== Plot ==
This film takes a look at the early days of the war and the deployment of young forces to the front. Naneh Gilaneh and her young son and daughter live a difficult life during the war and the bombing of Tehran.

== Cast ==
- Fatemeh Motamed-Arya as Gilaneh
- Bahram Radan as Esmail
- Baran Kosari as Maygol
- Zhaleh Sameti as Atefeh
- Shahrokh Foroutanian as Dr. Dabiri
- Majid Bahrami as The Soldier
- Nireh Farahani
- Niloufar Khosh Kholgh
- Mehdi Daneshraftar
- Amirhosein Ghodsi

== Awards ==
Category	Nominee	Result	Organization
Best Actress	Fatemeh Motamed-Arya	Candidate	Crystal Simorgh
Best Makeup	Mehrdad Mirkiani	Winner	Crystal Simorgh
Special Jury Prize	Rakhshān Banietemad	Winner	Crystal Simorgh

- Jury commendation plaque; Best Director; Rakhshan Bani-Etemad; 7th Canary Islands International Film Festival; Competition section; 2006
- Special Jury Prize; Best Director; Rakhshan Bani-Etemad; 10th Holy Defense Festival; Feature Film Competition Section; 2005
- Special Award; Best Actor; Fatemeh Motamedaria; 10th Holy Defense Festival; Feature Film Competition Section; 2005
- Pfeiffer Award; Best Movie; Saeed Saadi; 7th Sine Fan International Asian Film Festival; Competition section; 2005
- Netpak Award; Best Movie; Saeed Saadi; Twelfth International Asian Film Festival; Competition section; 2005
