= Soudabeh Moradian =

Iranian-American independent filmmaker (born 1972)

- سودابه مرادیان
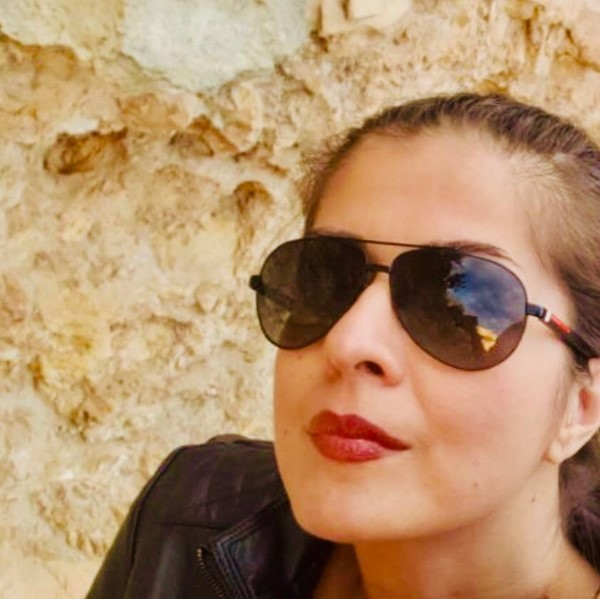
- Soudabeh Moradian, Location Scout in Arizona
- Born: Soudabeh Moradian; December 12, 1972 (age 53); Tehran, Iran
- Education: California Institute of the Arts Tehran University of Art
- Occupation: Film Director - Editor
- Years active: 1996–present
- Website: www.smoradian.com

Soudabeh Moradian (Persian:سودابه مرادیان) is an Iranian-American independent filmmaker. A number of her movies have been in official selection of various international film festivals and many of them won awards. She has made many documentary series about Iranian rural women, and some independent documentaries about "war and madness" such as "Doomsday Machine"," Story Of The Land On Ashes","Mahin", "Voices Against Them" and some other narrative and docufiction films and series like "The Leader of Caravan","My Name Is Tomorrow" and "Les Chroniques d'iran". She made her first full feature-length narrative called Polaris in 2014 in Los Angeles and Seattle starring Bahram Radan, Alicja Bachleda, Elisabeth Röhm and Coby Ryan McLaughlin. The subjects of her movies are mainly based on social issues, women and psychological impacts of war.

She's also been teaching at film schools and colleges such as the Art Institute of California, College of the Canyons, Columbia College Hollywood, etc. She is currently a film professor at Syracuse University, New York .

== Life ==
She was born in Tehran-Iran and started her career in directing, screen writing and editing in 1996 . She graduated from Tehran University of Art with a BFA in cinema in 1996 and got an MFA degree in Film and Video from California Institute of the Arts in 2015. She immigrated to the United States in 2009 and has been working as a screenwriter, director, editor and film professor in California and New York.

== Films ==
- The Mermaid- Feature - 2024

Writing, Directing and Editing

- My Blue Sky- Documentary - 2024

Directing and Editing

- Polaris - Feature - 2017

Writing and Directing
-2020 Reframe Stamp Recipient
-Won the best feature at Culver City Film Festival - Los Angeles
-Nominated for the best feature, best director and best actress at California Women's Film Festival - Los Angeles

- I Was Born Yesterday - Documentary - 2014

Directing and Editing
-Won the best documentary at Barcelona Planet Film Festival (Spain), European Film Festival (Russia), Spotlight Documentary Film Award (USA)
- Official selection of: Los Angeles CineFest (USA), Sydney World Film festival (Australia), Roma Cinemadoc (Italy), Barcelona Planet film festival (Spain), Toronto film week (Canada), Lisbon International film festival (Portugal), Venice film week, Silent Movie World film festival (Ukraine)

- Burnt City - Experimental Documentary - 2012

Directing and Editing

- With Iranian - Documentary series - 2010

Screen writing, Directing and Editing

- Les Chroniques d'Iran- Documentary series for Arte TV - 2009
- Doomsday Machine (Machine Rooze Ghiamat) – Documentary - 2006~2009

Screen writing, Directing and Editing
- Official Selection of UKIFF Film Festival (London -2010)
-Nominated in DOCSDF international Film Festival (Mexico-2009)
-Official Selection of Document 7-international human rights film festival (Scotland-2009)
-"a prize of honor"in Parivin Etesami Film Festival (Iran-2009)

- Outspoken : Los Angeles - Documentary - 2007

Associate producer

- Voices Against Them - Documentary - 2007

Producer, Co-Director and Editor

- The women of village (series 2)- documentary - 2002~2003

Screen writing, Directing and Editing

- My name is tomorrow- fiction series - 2003

Screen writing, Directing and Editing

- The savage sunflowers- feature - 2003

Editing

- Story of the land on ashes (Gheseye khake soukhte)- documentary - 2001

Screen writing, Directing and Editing
- Official Selection of 20th Fajr International Film Festival- Iran, 18th international Short Film Festival- Iran and third week of FOROUGH Film- Iran

- Green and being in love- documentary series - 2001

Screen writing, Directing and Editing

- Nexus – documentary series - 2000

Screen writing and Directing

- MAHIN – Documentary - 1999

Screen writing and Directing
- Achieved the honorary Diploma in KISH Documentary Film Festival-Iran
- Official Selection of Iranian films in North America and Achieved the honorary Diploma in Vancouver
- Official Selection of festivals: Hamburg (Germany), Dresden (Germany), Ebenezer (Austria), Borne (Czech Republic)...

- Rain for surviving – documentary series - 1997

Screen writing, Directing and Editing

- The women of village (series 1) – documentary series - 1997

Screen writing, Directing and Editing

- Discovering Iran – Documentary parts of the Discovering Iran CD. - 1997

Directing and Editing

- The leader of Caravan (Ghafeleh Salar)- short film - 1996

Screen writing, Directing and Editing
- Official Selection of Madrid Film Festival

== Other activities ==
- Panelist for 2021 NYSCA/NYFA Artist Fellows (New York Foundation for the Arts)
- Jury member for a number of film festivals such as 13th Los Angeles Greek Film Festival and Syracuse International Film Festival 2021
- Vice President of Iranian documentary filmmakers association IRDFA (2008–2009)
- Executive manager of the First workshop on documentary film making by IRDFA (Iranian documentary filmmakers association) and DEFC (documentary and experimental film center) in Tehran, Iran
- Columnist and Film critic in newspapers and artistic foundations.
- Member of International Documentary Association(IDA), The D-Word and IRDFA
