= The Day of the Siege: September Eleven 1683 =

- Polish poster for the film September Eleven 1684
- Bitwa pod Wiedniem
- Directed by: Renzo Martinelli
- Written by: Giuseppe Baiocchi; Alessandro Leone
- Screenplay by: Renzo Martinelli; Valerio Manfredi
- Produced by: Renzo Martinelli; Alessandro Leone
- Starring: F. Murray Abraham; Enrico Lo Verso; Andrea Iaia; Alicja Bachleda; Jerzy Skolimowski
- Cinematography: Fabio Cianchetti
- Edited by: Tommaso Feraboli
- Music by: Roberto Cacciapaglia
- Production companies: Agresywna Banda; Martinelli Film Company International
- Distributed by: Monolith Films (Poland); 01 Distribution (Italy)
- Release date: 12 October 2012 (Poland)
- Running time: 114 minutes
- Countries: Poland; Italy
- Languages: English; German
- Budget: €13 million
- Box office: $2.1 million

The Day of the Siege: September Eleven 1683 (Italian: 11 Settembre 1683; Polish: Bitwa pod Wiedniem, literally: "The Battle of Vienna"; also released as Siege Lord 2: Day of the Siege) is a 2012 English-language Polish and Italian historical drama film based on the 1683 Battle of Vienna and directed by Renzo Martinelli. The film was released on 12 October 2012.

== Plot ==
In late 1682 northern Italy, Catholic monk Marco d'Aviano is known far and wide for his ability to perform miracles. Crowds gather to watch him speak, hoping that he can perform a miracle to stop the advancing Ottoman Empire. The ruler of the Ottomans, Sultan Mehmed IV, appoints Kara Mustafa Pasha as his Grand Vizier. Kara Mustafa seeks to establish an Islamic caliphate across Europe and is notorious for turning Christian churches in conquered territories into mosques. Kara Mustafa terrifies Europe after informing the Sultan that he intends to march the Ottoman military into Rome, conquering the city and turning St. Peter's Basilica into a mosque.

Kara Mustafa shows his favorite wife, Leila, an amulet that was given to him by a man after he saved him from dying in an accident while visiting Venice. Leila tells Kara Mustafa that she is troubled by a recurring dream where he is killed by arrows fired from hundreds of archers after a monk holds up a cross. Disturbed by this, Kara Mustafa consults a kahin, who predicts that Kara will see much blood, but the blood will not be his. Before Kara Mustafa leaves for Europe with his army, he gives the amulet to his tearful son, promising that the amulet means he will return. A comet with a red tail is seen, and is taken by both Kara Mustafa and Marco as a sign of victory.

Marco stops an angry mob, stirred up by anti-Ottoman sentiment, from killing one of his friends, a Muslim named Abu'l. However, despite this, Abu'l leaves his deaf wife behind to assist the Ottomans in their invasion of Europe. The ruler of the Holy Roman Empire, Leopold I requests Marco's presence in Vienna for advice on current events. Marco arrives and informs the shocked Emperor that the Ottomans have broken their peace treaty and are heading towards Vienna, having already advanced to Hungary. Marco suggests that Leopold ally himself with Saxony, Bavaria and the Polish–Lithuanian Commonwealth. Leopold disregards Marco's advice.

Leopold's daughter, the Duchess of Lorena, is suffering from breast cancer, and Marco miraculously heals her disease. She encourages her father to listen to Marco's advice. The number of troops in Vienna soon grows to 50,000, vastly outnumbered by the 300,000 man Ottoman army. At this time, Kara Mustafa instructs Abu'l to serve as his translator, instructing the people of Vienna to surrender to the Ottomans. Abu'l's wife, Lena, who accompanied Marco to Vienna, is shocked to see her husband working with the Ottomans. That night, she sneaks into the camp to speak to him, only to be captured by the Ottomans. Abu'l is asked if he knows her, and he says no. She is then brought to the other captive women who are being used as sex slaves for the army, but Abu'l later pays to have her released.

The Tartars arrive, warning Kara to protect the rear of their army from the Polish, but he ignores this advice. The Turks use cannons to destroy Vienna’s walls and attack the city. The forces defending Vienna suffer heavy casualties and begin to doubt if they will stop the Ottomans from taking the city. However, at this time, the Polish arrive, led by King Jan III Sobieski. The largely protestant forces of Vienna do not want to listen to the Catholic Polish king, but Marco convinces them to do so. Sobieski plans a desperate charge from the top of the Kahlenberg mountain behind the Ottoman forces, where they will least expect an attack.

Kara Mustafa realizes that the man he saved all those years ago in Venice was actually Marco. Curious, he has Abu’l arrange for a meeting with Marco. The two men discuss the differences between Islamic submission and Christian virtues, and Marco tries in vain to convince Kara Mustafa to abandon his attack on the city. On September 11, 1683, Marco gives a speech to the army urging them to defend their Christian faith and western civilization from destruction. Using strategy and traps, the Ottoman cavalry suffers heavy casualties. When the Ottomans are weak, the Polish troops on top of the Kahlenberg attack from the rear and win the battle. Following this defeat, the Ottomans never again march into western Europe.

Kara Mustafa is enraged at the loss and admonishes his tacticians, who angrily inform him that he was the one who did not listen to their concerns about artillery on top of the Kahlenberg. Kara Mustafa appears to charge at the troops on horseback, only to be killed by arrows. However, it is determined that this was merely a decoy, and the real Kara Mustafa fled from the battle. On Christmas Day, 1683, Sultan Mehmed orders Kara Mustafa's son to watch his execution as punishment for failing to capture Vienna and fleeing from the battle in cowardice. After the execution, Kara Mustafa's son throws the amulet his father gave him in the snow.

== Cast ==
- F. Murray Abraham as Marco d'Aviano
- Enrico Lo Verso as Kara Mustafa
- Jerzy Skolimowski as Jan III Sobieski
- Alicja Bachleda as Eleanor of Austria, Queen of Poland (Polish: Eleonora Habsburżanka)
- Isabella Orsini as Leila
- Andrea Iaia as Giovanni Cristofori
- Piotr Adamczyk as Leopold I, Holy Roman Emperor (Polish: Leopold I Habsburg)
- Cristina Serafini as Rosa Cristofori
- Antonio Cupo as Charles V Duke of Lorraine
- Yorgo Voyagis as Abu'l
- Daniel Olbrychski as Marcin Kazimierz Kątski
- Borys Szyc as Mikołaj Sieniawski
- Andrzej Seweryn as Jan Andrzej Morsztyn
- Krzysztof Kwiatkowski as John George III
- Marius Chivu as Cosma
- Giorgio Lupano as Count Ernst Rüdiger von Starhemberg
- Marcin Walewski as Jakub "Fanfan" Sobieski
- Wojciech Mecwaldowski as Jerzy Franciszek Kulczycki
- Ștefan Iancu as Kara Mustafa's son
- Matteo Branciamore as Prince Eugene of Savoy
- Dan Cogalniceanu

== Production ==
It took ten years to raise the film's $13,000,000 budget. In addition to the theatrical version, the filmmakers have prepared a longer version to be released on television as a mini-series. Filming began in April 2011, with support from backers in Austria, Poland and Italy, with RAI supporting with 5.8 million euro, and another million euro from the Friuli region.

The title's allusion to the 11 September 2001 attacks is intentional. Director Martinelli explained that while that date is associated with the attacks on the United States, few people know that the date also marks the historical events of 1683 when 300,000 soldiers moved from Constantinople to Vienna with an intent to capture Rome and turn St. Peter's Basilica into a mosque. In reality, though, the Battle of Vienna (Schlacht am Kahlenberg) took place on 12 September 1683.

During production in June, it was first revealed that with a planned-for 13-week shooting schedule, the film would be using over 100 actors from Poland, the United States, Italy, Romania, Turkey, Greece, Spain, and France, over 10,000 extras and 3,000 horses in the battle scenes. Filmmakers were unable to acquire permissions to use castle structures in Poland, and although interiors of Wilanów Palace were eventually used, castle exteriors were shot at Mantua, Lombardy, to represent that of King Jan III Sobieski. The film was shot entirely in English with intention for worldwide distribution.

== Reception ==
Few reviews were published about the film. Movieguide gave the film's entertainment quality four stars and wrote: "DAY OF THE SIEGE is a magnificent, engaging historical epic about the people, the politics and the faith in the events of the battle for Vienna." Polityka criticized the film's special effects and stressed that the film is not a documentary, but is instead a drama with fictional elements, like any other historical movie. ISBN 8804519533 ISBN 978-8804519539

== Home media ==
On 22 July 2014, Phase 4 Films released the film on DVD. On 3 August 2022, the American Catholic publishing house Ignatius Press announced they would be releasing a DVD for the film on 1 September 2022, under the English title The Siege of Vienna: September 11, 1683.
