= The Wooden Bridge =

- The theatrical poster
- Directed by: Mehdi Karampour m
- Written by: Mehdi Karampoor; Khosrow Naghibi
- Produced by: Ali Sartipi
- Starring: Mahnaz Afshar; Bahram Radan; Borzoo Arjmand; Farhad Aslani; Mehran Modiri; Hedieh Tehrani
- Cinematography: Touraj Mansouri
- Edited by: Bahram Dehghani
- Music by: Karen Homayunfar
- Release date: 2012
- Running time: 98 minutes
- Country: Iran
- Language: Persian

The Wooden Bridge (in Persian: پل چوبی) is a 2012 Iranian film directed by Mehdi Karampour.

== Cast ==
- Mahnaz Afshar as Shirin
- Bahram Radan as Amir
- Borzoo Arjmand as Siavash
- Farhad Aslani as Rabi'
- Mehran Modiri as Dr. Sabouhi
- Atila Pesyani as Uncle Naser
- Omid Rohani as Rahmat Lotfi
- Hedieh Tehrani as Nazli
- Khosrow Pesyani as Mani

It is about life of a young couple who want to migrate from their country. But the arrival of Nazli makes problems...
