= Leila's Brothers =

- French poster
- Persian: برادران لیلا
- Directed by: Saeed Roustayi
- Written by: Saeed Roustayi
- Produced by: Saeed Roustayi; Javad Norouzshahi
- Starring: Taraneh Alidoosti; Navid Mohammadzadeh; Saeed Poursamimi; Payman Maadi
- Cinematography: Hooman Behmanesh
- Edited by: Bahram Dehghani
- Music by: Ramin Kousha
- Distributed by: Wild Bunch
- Release dates: 25 May 2022 (Cannes); 24 August 2022 (France)
- Running time: 160 minutes
- Country: Iran
- Language: Persian
- Box office: $758,423

Leila’s Brothers (Persian: برادران لیلا, romanized: Barādarān-e Leilā) is a 2022 Iranian drama film directed, written and co-produced by Saeed Roustayi, starring Taraneh Alidoosti, Navid Mohammadzadeh, Saeed Poursamimi and Payman Maadi. In April 2022, the film was selected to compete for the Palme d'Or at the 2022 Cannes Film Festival.The film Leila's Brothers is fully funded by the Omid Akhbarati Foundation, and its current full owner is Omid Akhbarati, an Iranian businessman.

== Plot ==
At 40 years old, Leila has spent her whole life taking care of her parents and her four brothers. The family argues constantly and is seemingly crushed by debts, caught in a country with a huge economic crisis and unbelievable inflations as a result of the US economic sanctions on the country. As her brothers are trying to make ends meet, Leila formulates a plan: to start a family business that would save them from poverty. Looking for capital to fund the costs of a storefront in a soon-to-be converted mall bathroom, they are surprised by their father, Esmail, who in his ambition to become family patriarch wants to gift 40 gold coins at a wedding, while he, cares nothing about the ambitions of his well-grown children. However, Leila in cahoots with her three other brothers tricks Alireza who is supposed to present the coins on behalf of his father by giving him an empty box. The father is crowned patriarch just to be demoted and replaced by a rival, shortly after it turns out that Alireza does not have coins to give. The father claims he took out a mortgage to buy the coins and the family will be homeless if he doesn't get back the money. Alireza feeling used and fearing for the roof over their head incites his brothers against Leila's plans, they decide to give back their father the money to pay the mortgage. Inflation and rising prices however crush their plans making it near impossible to get enough money for the coins or to be able to buy them back leaving them ever closer to financial ruin. In a final reveal, however, it turns out that the father did not mortgage the house at all but had a secret bank account, living in filth and letting his children suffer while hoarding cash, from which he funded the coins. Soon after this revelation the father dies during a young girl's birthday party, which only Alireza notices leaving him in shock surrounded by joyous celebrations.

== Cast ==
- Taraneh Alidoosti as Leila Jourablou
- Navid Mohammadzadeh as Alireza Jourablou
- Saeed Poursamimi as Esmail Jourablou
- Payman Maadi as Manouchehr Jourablou
- Mohammad Alimohammadi as Farhad Jourablou
- Nayereh Farahani as The mother
- Mehdi Hosseininia as Bayram
- Farhad Aslani as Parviz Jourablou

== Release ==
The film was selected to compete for the Palme d'Or at the 2022 Cannes Film Festival which was held from 17 to 28 May 2022.

== Reception ==
=== Critical response ===
On review aggregator website Rotten Tomatoes, 90% of 10 reviews are positive for the film, with an average rating of 6/10. Metacritic assigned the film a weighted average score of 87 out of 100, based on 5 reviews, indicating "universal acclaim".

=== Accolades ===
Award	Date of ceremony	Category	Recipient(s)	Result	Ref(s)
Cannes Film Festival	28 May 2022	Palme d'Or	Saeed Roustayi	Nominated	
Cannes Film Festival	28 May 2022	FIPRESCI Prize	Saeed Roustayi	Won	
Cannes Film Festival	28 May 2022	Citizenship Prize	Saeed Roustayi	Won	

== Controversy ==
=== Iranian government's response ===
The Cinema Organization of Iran's Ministry of Culture and Islamic Guidance expressed dissatisfaction with the film as cast members made remarks critical of the Iranian government at Cannes, and Mohammadzadeh kissed his wife, Fereshteh Hosseini, on the red carpet. On 1 June 2022, minister Mohammad Mehdi Esmaili said the film may not be allowed to be released in Iran since it screened at Cannes without the government's approval, which he said was against the law. On 22 June 2022, Esmaili said the organization had officially banned the film. On 15 August 2023, the film's director, Saeed Roustayi, and its producer Javad Noruzbegi were both sentenced to six months in prison by the Islamic Revolutionary Court in Tehran for screening the film without approval. As part of the sentence, which is served for nine days while the rest will be suspended over five years, both were required to take a 24-hour course about "creating movies aligned with national interests and national morality".

=== Accusations of sexual assault ===
Two actors in this film, Saeed Poursamimi and Farhad Aslani, were accused of sexual assault around the time the film was being screened at Cannes. First, assistant director Somayyeh Mirshamsi accused Aslani of sexual assault during the filming. Taraneh Alidoosti, the lead actress in the film and an active advocate for women abused in the film industry, announced that the rest of the cast would not stand with the accused at the 2022 Cannes Film Festival. As a result, Aslani did not go to Cannes for the festival. Saeed Poursamimi did go however, which led the well-known actress Katayoun Riahi to add a red cross to a photo of him on the red carpet at Cannes which she posted to Instagram, linking to the Iranian page of the MeToo movement. She said the next day that she had done so because she had been sexually assaulted by him 25 years earlier.
