= Mohammad Reza Foroutan =

Iranian actor

- محمدرضا فروتن
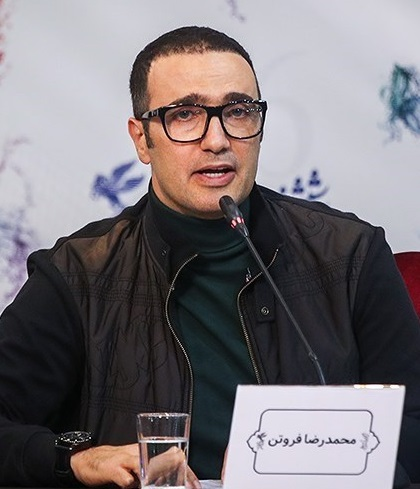
- Foroutan at the 2018 Fajr Film Festival
- Born: December 28, 1968 (age 57); Tehran, Iran
- Occupations: Actor, singer
- Years active: since 1994
- Height: 1.70 m (5 ft 7 in)

Mohammad Reza Foroutan (Persian: محمدرضا فروتن; born December 28, 1968, in Tehran) is an Iranian actor and singer.

== Life ==
Mohammad Reza Foroutan was born on December 28, 1968, in Tehran.He has started acting since 1994.He studied Health Psychology. He currently holds a PhD in Health Psychology.

== Career ==
His first film was Goal. After some minor roles, his performance in an episode of TV series The Clue revealed his capabilities and Masoud Kimiay chose him for the leading role of Mercedes. He has received several awards including the best male actor award for acting in Ghermez at the 1999 Fajr International Film Festival and best male actor award for acting in Be Ahestegi at the 2005 Fajr International Film Festival.

== Filmography ==
- 1994: Goal
- 1994: The Last Port (Akharin Bandar)
- Winner
- 1995: The Moon and the Sun (Mah va Khorshid)
- 1998: Mercedes
- 1998: Red (Ghermez)
- 1999: Two Women (Do Zan)
- 1999: Cry (Faryad)
- 2000: Protest (Eteraz)
- The Yalda Night (Shab-e Yalda)
- 2001: Under the Skin of the City (Zir-e poost-e Shahr)
- 2001: Born Under Libra (Motevalede mahe mehr)
- 2001: Dance with Dream (Ba Roya Beraghs)
- 2003: Meet the Parrot (Molaghat ba tooti)
- 2004: Friday's Soldiers (Sarbaz-haye Jome)
- 2004: The Loser (Bazandeh)
- 2005: Octopus (Hashtpa)
- 2005: Top of the Tower (Nok-e Borj)
- 2006: When everyone was asleep (Vaghti hame khab boodand)
- 2006: Cold Soil (Khak-e sard)
- 2006: Gradually (Be Ahestegi)
- 2007: The Night Bus
- 2007: Second Woman (Zan-e Dovom)
- 2008: Canaan
- 2008: Invitation (Davat)
- 2014: Tales (Ghesse-ha)
- 2014: Sensitive Floor
- 2015:Night Shift
- 2017: Negar
- 2019: Symphony No. 9
- 2019: Mannequin (TV series)
