= Farimah Farjami =

Iranian actress (1952–2023)

- فریماه فرجامی
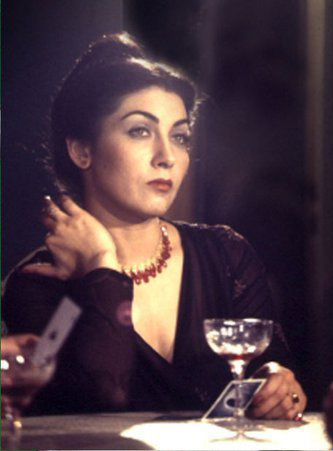
- Farjami in 1980
- Born: 8 May 1952; Tehran, Iran
- Died: 30 June 2023 (aged 71)
- Education: Tehran University of Art (BA)
- Occupation: Actress
- Years active: 1976–2019

Farimah Farjami (Persian: فریماه فرجامی, 8 May 1952 – 30 June 2023) was an Iranian actress. She received various accolades, including a Crystal Simorgh for The Last Act (1991). Her acting in films, especially in independent women's dramas, was repeatedly praised by critics. She was often referred to as one of the leading actors of her generation.

== Life and career ==
Farjami's performances in the roles of wandering and wavering young or middle age women who struggle with psychological and personal problems were admired by film critics, and won awards for The Lead (1988, Masoud Kimiai), The Last Act (1990, Varouj Karim-Masihi), and Nargess (1992, Rakhshan Bani Etemad) from International Fajr Film Festival.

Farjami died on 30 June 2023, at the age of 71, after suffering two strokes.
