= Alicja Bachleda-Curuś =

Polish actress and singer (born 1983)

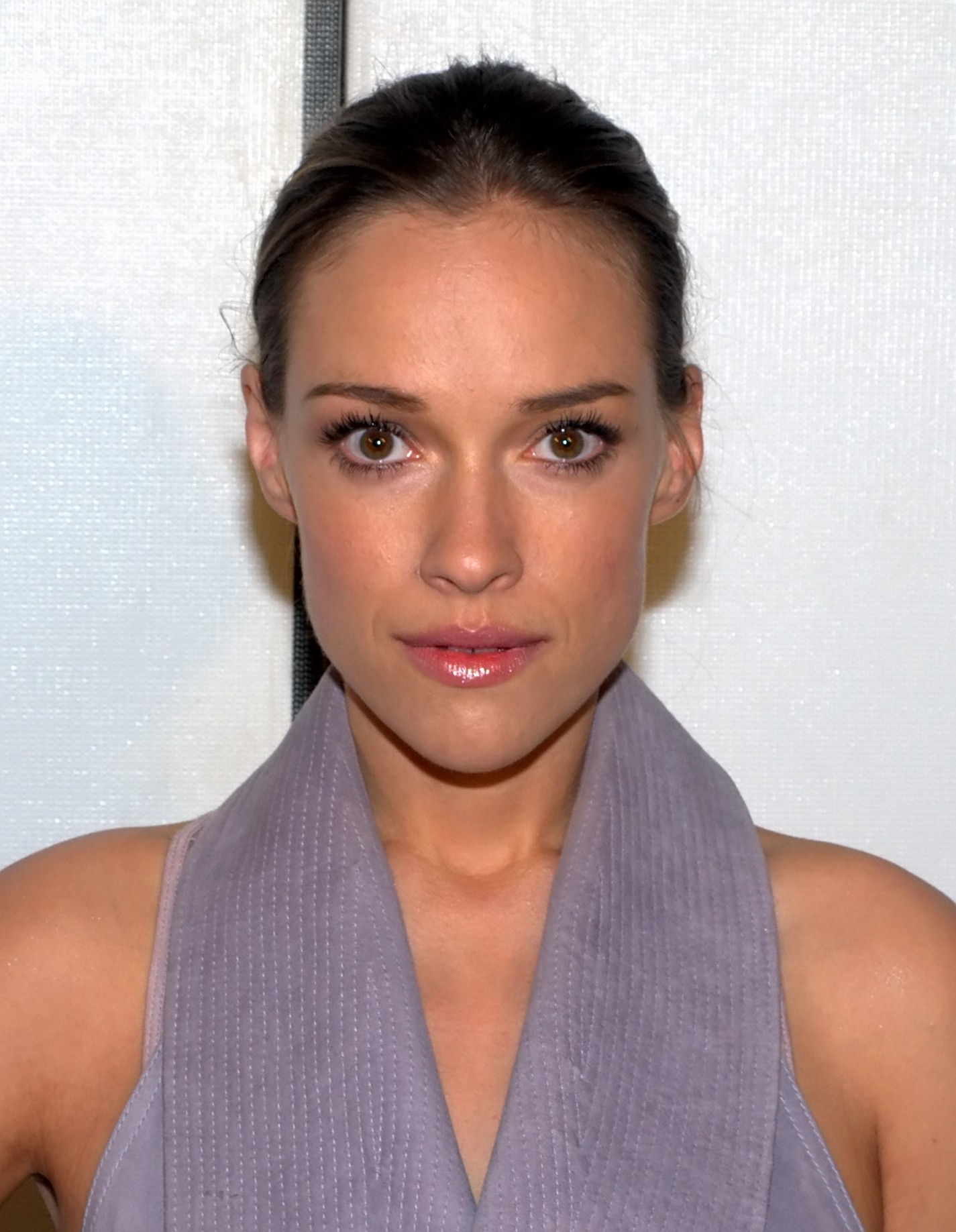
- Bachleda Curuś at the premiere of Ondine at the 2010 Tribeca Film Festival.
- Born: 12 May 1983 (age 43); Tampico, Mexico
- Education: Jagiellonian University; Lee Strasberg Theatre and Film Institute; University of California (B.A.)
- Occupations: Actress; singer
- Years active: 1991–present
- Children: 1

Alicja Bachleda-Curuś (pron. [aˈlit͡sʲja baˈxlɛda ˈt͡suruɕ]; born 12 May 1983) is a Polish actress and singer who has appeared in films including Trade, Ondine and Pan Tadeusz.

== Early life ==
Bachleda-Curuś was born in Tampico, Mexico. She is the daughter of Lidia and Tadeusz Bachleda-Curuś, a geologist who was working in Mexico at that time. She has a brother, Tadeusz Bachleda-Curuś and half-sister, Urszula Welenc. Her uncle, Adam Bachleda-Curuś, is the former mayor of Zakopane, Poland, the city where she was raised.

While growing up in Poland, Bachleda studied at the Elżbieta Armatys's Theater, Music and Dance Studio with an additional profile with extended learning of Spanish and English. She studied Iberian studies and cultural studies at the Jagiellonian University, but suspended her studies due to professional reasons She studied acting at the Lee Strasberg Theatre and Film Institute in New York City, as well as psychology at the University of California where she graduated with a degree in art history.

== Acting career ==
Alicja Bachleda, Colin Farrell and director Neil Jordan at the Ondine premiere, 2010 Tribeca Film Festival in New York.

At age 15, Bachleda landed a lead role in the 1999 film Pan Tadeusz, directed by Academy Award-winning Polish director Andrzej Wajda. Four years later, she won a role in Polish soap opera Na dobre i na złe. Bachleda then began crossing over into mainstream films outside Poland, appearing in the German film Sommersturm, a coming of age story, in 2004. Bachleda-Curuś returned to Mexico to film the 2007 thriller Trade, starring Kevin Kline, an unflinching look at the world of human trafficking. Bachleda then returned to Europe to play a Jewish girl in the historical drama The Beheaded Rooster, which took place during World War II in Transylvania, Romania. Her next film was 2009's Ondine, a film about an Irish fisherman who thinks he catches a selkie, a mythological seal/human.

In 2012 Bachleda-Curuś starred as Eleanor of Austria, Queen of Poland in September Eleven 1683, and appeared in a lead role in The Girl Is in Trouble.

== Personal life ==
On 7 October 2009 in Los Angeles, Bachleda-Curuś gave birth to her son Henry with Irish actor Colin Farrell. He was baptized on 29 December 2009 in the Catholic Church of the Visitation of the Blessed Virgin Mary in Kraków. It was reported on 15 October 2010 that Farrell and Bachleda-Curuś had separated.

== Filmography ==
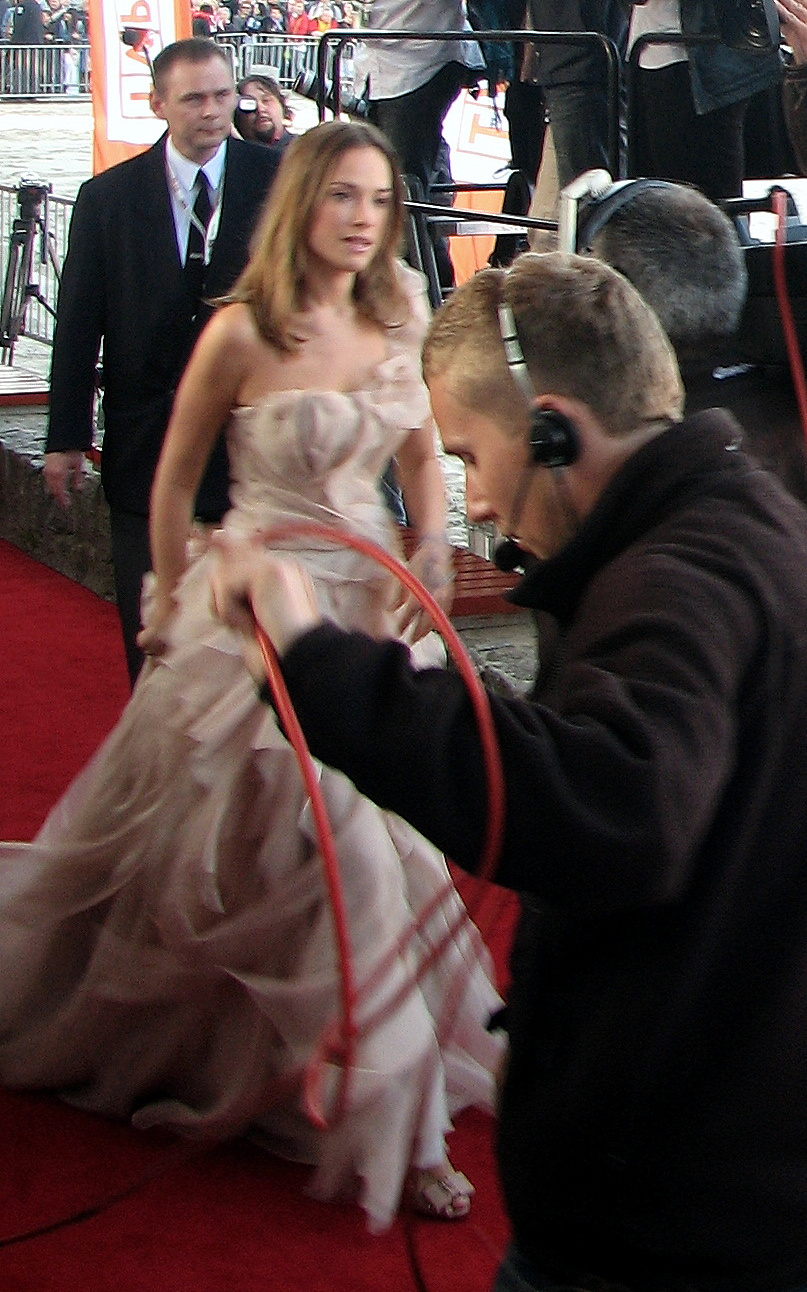
Alicja Bachleda at the Gdynia Film Festival in 2010.

=== Film ===
Year	Title	Role	Director	Notes
1996	Vis a vis	—N/a	Borys Lankosz	Short film
1999	Pan Tadeusz	Zosia Horeszkówna	Andrzej Wajda	—N/a
1999	The Gateway of Europe	Zosia	Jerzy Wójcik	—N/a
2000	Syzyfowe prace	Anna "Biruta" Stogowska	Paweł Komorowski	—N/a
2001	Heart Over Head	Wanda	Michael Gutmann	—N/a
2004	Summer Storm	Anke	Marco Kreuzpaintner	—N/a
2004	Blood of the Templars	Stella	Florian Baxmeyer	Television film
2006	Comme des voleurs (à l'est)	Anke	Lionel Baier	Romantic comedy film
2007	Trade	Veronica	Marco Kreuzpaintner	—N/a
2007	The Beheaded Rooster	Gisela Glückselig	Radu Gabrea	—N/a
2009	Ondine	Ondine	Neil Jordan	—N/a
2010	Friendship!	Zoey	Markus Goller	—N/a
2012	The Day of the Siege: September Eleven 1683	Eleonora Habsburżanka	Markus Goller	—N/a
2015	The Girl Is in Trouble	Signe	Julius Onah	—N/a
2015	Breathe	Ania Kardel	Paul Kowalski	Short film
2015	Edge	Pilar	Shane Black	Television film
2016	7 rzeczy, których nie wiecie o facetach	Basia	Kinga Lewińska	Comedy film
2016	The American Side	Nikki Meeker	Jenna Ricker	—N/a
2016	Polaris	Baran	Soudabeh Moradian	—N/a
2016	Pitbull: Tough Women	Małgorzata "Drabina" Bojke	Patryk Vega	Crime and drama film

=== Television series ===
Year	Title	Role	Notes
2002	Lokatorzy	Gabrysia	Comedy film
2002–2004	Na dobre i na złe	Anna Bochenek	Romantic drama film
2005	Sperling	Alina Serkovic	Crime film

=== Video games ===
Year	Title	Role	Notes
2014	Wolfenstein: The New Order	Anya Oliwa	—N/a
2017	Wolfenstein II: The New Colossus	Anya Oliwa	—N/a
2019	Wolfenstein: Youngblood	Anya Oliwa	—N/a

== Discography ==
=== Albums ===
- Klimat (2001)

=== Singles ===
- "Dotknąć nieba" (with Piotr Cugowski (son of Krzysztof Cugowski)) (2007)
- "Klimat" (2001)
- "Ich verlier mich gern in Dir" (from the film Heart Over Head) (2001)
- "Marzyć chcę" (1999)
