= Farid Mostafavi =

Iranian screenwriter

فرید مصطفوی Farid Mostafavi
- Born: Farid Mostafavi Kashani; 27 October 1954 (age 71); Tehran, Iran
- Occupation: Screenwriter
- Spouse: Parichehr Momtahen (1983–present)
- Children: Sohrab Kashani (born 1989)

Farid Mostafavi (Persian: فرید مصطفوی; born 27 October 1954 in Tehran, Iran) is an Iranian screenwriter best known for his social realist films set in urban Tehran, several of which were directed and co-written by Rakhshan Bani-Etemad.

== Education ==
Mostafavi attended the "Institute of Cinema and Television" in 1979 and studied economics at Tehran University.

== Career ==
His career in IRIB began in 1989 and later expanded to film. He has worked as writer and co-producer on "An Outlook to the Cinema", a thirteen-part television program about cinema (1983–1984), as assistant director on "The World Satirist", a ten-part television play (1984–1986), as voice-over writer for documentary films on "Centrality" (directed by Rakhshan Bani-Etemad) and "Immigrants" (directed by F. Shafaee), and as researcher and screenwriter on "Crossing from Iran Deserts", a documentary/fiction series (1997).

== Filmography ==
- Kharej az Mahdudeh (1986 - a.k.a. Off-Limits)
- Payizan (1987)
- Rooz-e Bashokouh (1989 - a.k.a. The Grand Day)
- Zard-e Qanari (1988 - a.k.a. Canary Yellow)
- Pul-e Khareji (1989 - a.k.a. Foreign Currency)
- Omid (1991)
- Badal (1994 - a.k.a. The Stuntman)
- Roya-ye nime-shab-e tabestan (1994 - a.k.a. The Midnight Summer's Dream)
- Zir-e Pust-e Shahr (2001 - a.k.a. Under the Skin of the city)
- Zendan-e Zanan (2002 - a.k.a. Women's Prison)
- Zahr-e Asal (2003 - a.k.a. Honey Bane)
- Gilane (2005)
- Taghato (2006 - a.k.a. Crossroads)
- Asr-e Jome (2006 - a.k.a. Friday Evening)
- Khunbazi (2006 - a.k.a. Mainline)
- Zaadboom (2009 - a.k.a. Birthplace)
- Ghesseh-ha (2014 - a.k.a. Tales)
- Kafshhaiam Koo? (2016 - a.k.a. Where Are My Shoes?)

== Honors and awards ==
- Best Screenplay Award, House of Cinema Festival (for Women's Prison)
- Best Screenplay Award, House of Cinema Festival (for Crossroads, with Abolhassan Davoudi)
- Best Screenplay Award, International Fajr Film Festival (for Khunbazi, with Rakhshan Bani-Etemad, Mohsen Abdolvahab and Naghmeh Samini)
- Best Screenplay Award, International Fajr Film Festival (for Birthplace, with Abolhassan Davoudi)
- Best Screenplay Award, 71st Venice International Film Festival (for Tales, with Rakhshan Bani-Etemad)
