= Ladakh International Film Festival =

Annually Film Festival

- Location: Leh, Ladakh, India
- Founded: 2012
- Awards: Snow Leopard Trophy
- Language: English
- Website: liff.in

The Ladakh International Film Festival (LIFF) is an international film festival that is held annually in Ladakh, India. Inaugurated in 2012, it is the first international film festival to be held in Ladakh. It is held in the Himalayan town of Leh, the largest town in Ladakh, at an altitude of more than 11,000 feet (3350 metres), making it the highest-altitude film festival in the world. A major theme of the festival is wildlife conservation. In partnership with the Snow Leopard Conservancy India Trust, the festival offers the Snow Leopard Trophy for the most educational or inspiring film about an endangered species.

The festival was organized by Kerala-based filmmaker Melwyn Williams Chirayath and his business associate Meghna Dubey, partners at Monasse Films.

== 2012 festival ==
The first annual LIFF was held on 15–17 June 2012. It was attended by Omar Abdullah, the chief minister of the then-state of Jammu and Kashmir. The festival chair was film director Shyam Benegal, and the head of the jury was Assamese film director Jahnu Barua. There were 28 films in the competition category, with the winner to receive the Snow Leopard Trophy and one million rupees.

The competition winners in 2012 included Alexandra David Neel (Best Feature Film), Partners in Crime (Best Documentary Film), Aaliya (Best Short Film), Bouli Lanners (Best Director), Bahram Radan (Best Actor), Dominique Blanc (Best Actress).

== 2013 festival ==
The second annual LIFF was initially planned for 5–7 July 2013, but was postponed due to flooding in the neighboring state of Uttarakhand. After a delay, the second festival was held 13–15 September 2013. Categories of films at the 2013 LIFF included features, documentaries, short films, international films, Ladakh films, student films, and children's films. There was also a retrospective of films by film director, poet, and lyricist Gulzar (Sampooran Singh Kalra), curated by Vishal Bhardwaj.

Public figures attending the 2013 festival included Shaida Mohammad Abdali, Afghan Ambassador to India; Gulzar; and filmmakers Aparna Sen, Vishal Bhardwaj, Rakeysh Omprakash Mehra, and Madhur Bhandarkar. The jury was chaired by filmmaker Aparna Sen, and also included Canadian filmmaker Teri C. McLuhan and Sri Lankan filmmaker Vimukthi Jayasundara.

The 2013 festival hosted the "Green Carpet" Indian premiere of McLuhan's The Frontier Gandhi, a film about nonviolent Muslim freedom fighter Abdul Ghaffar Khan. Introduced by Abdali, the film received a standing ovation. Also receiving a Green Carpet premiere was Rakeysh Omprakash Mehra's film Bhaag Milkha Bhaag about Indian sprinter Milkha Singh.

The competition winners in 2013 included OASS (Best Film), Who will be a Gurkha (Best Documentary), Dwand (Best Short Film), Manju Patra Borah (Best Director), Sewan Sing Yein (Best Actor), and Divya Chhetri (Best Actress).

== See also ==
- Festivals in Ladakh
