= Hossein Jafarian =

Iranian cinematographer (born 1944)

Hossein Jafarian حسین جعفریان
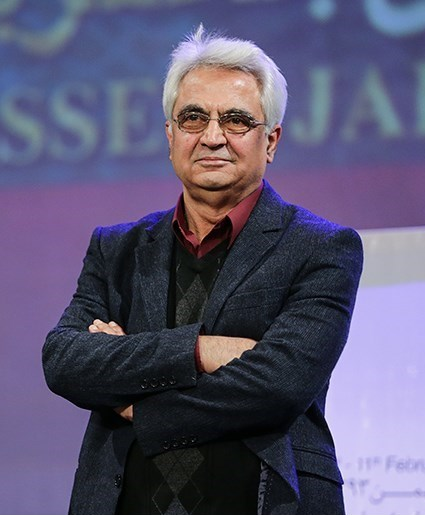
- Born: March 25, 1944 (age 82); Tehran, Iran
- Education: Tehran University of Art
- Occupations: Director of Photography, Screenwriter
- Spouse: Noori Hoghooghi Jafarian (m. 1977)
- Website: http://www.hosseinjafarian.com

Hossein Jafarian (Persian: حسین جعفریان, born 25 March 1944 in Tehran) is an Iranian cinematographer.

== Career ==
Hossein Jafarian is a graduate of the Iran Broadcasting University. He began his career working for Iranian state-run television where he shot over 40 documentaries and TV shows before retiring early soon after the 1979 Islamic Revolution. His feature film debut was with 1984's Tatooreh. But it wasn't until 1992's Nargess that he established himself as a leading cinematographer in Iran. It was with Nargess that he for the first time captured "real nights" on the Iranian film screen. Jafarian has a distinctive style of his own. His work draws comparisons with the American cinematographer Gordon Willis for his use of darkness and low-key lighting. Many of his films have gone on to win awards at international film festival, including; Abbas Kiarostami's Through the Olive Trees, Jafar Panahi's Crimson Gold and Asghar Farhadi's Fireworks Wednesday and About Elly. He was a guest at 2004's Camerimage with Crimson Gold and was nominated for the 'Golden Frog' in 2009 for About Elly.

Hossein Jafarian was voted the best cinematographer of the Iranian decade of the 1380s (2001-2011) by over 130 film critics in the 100th issue of the Iranian magazine Sanaat Cinama (Cinema Industry).

In 2018 Mr. Jafarian was invited to join the Academy of Motion Picture Arts and Sciences in the United States - the first Iranian cinematographer to have been invited.

== Selected filmography (as a director of photography) ==
- Nargess (1992)
- Through the Olive Trees (1994)
- The May Lady (1998)
- Two Women (1999)
- Under the Skin of the City (2001)
- Afflicted Generation (2001)
- Yalda's Night (2002)
- Crimson Gold (2003)
- One Night (2005)
- Fireworks Wednesday (2007)
- About Elly (2009)
- Gold and Copper (2010)
- Che (2014)
- Salesman (2016)

== Books and publications ==
- Lens: In Photography and Cinematography by Hossein Jafarian.

== See also ==
- Iranian Cinema
