= The Blue Veiled =

The Blue Veiled Rusari Abi
- Persian: روسری‌آبی
- Directed by: Rakhshān Banietemad
- Written by: Rakhshān Banietemad
- Produced by: Majid Modaresi; Production Manager: Jahangir Kosari
- Starring: Ezzatolah Entezami; Fatemeh Motamed-Arya; Golab Adineh; Afsar Asadi; Baran Kosari; Behnaz Jafari; Reza Fayazi; Farhad Aslani; Nematollah Gorji; Faghiheh Soltani; Jamshid Esmailkhani
- Cinematography: Aziz Saati
- Edited by: Abbas Ganjavi
- Music by: Ahmad Pejman
- Distributed by: Joozan Film
- Release date: 1 February 1995; Fajr International Film Festival
- Running time: 85 minutes
- Country: Iran
- Language: Persian

The Blue Veiled (Persian: روسری‌آبی, romanized: Rūsarī-Ābī) is a 1995 Iranian romance-drama film written and directed by Rakhshān Banietemad..

== Plot ==
Rasoul Rahmani owns a tomato farm and a factory next to it. He has lost his wife a few years ago and lives alone. Nobar Kurdani is a woman who takes care of her family and has to work. She is selected along with several other women to work on the farm.

== Cast ==
- Ezzatolah Entezami
- Fatemeh Motamed-Arya
- Golab Adineh
- Afsar Asadi
- Baran Kosari
- Behnaz Jafari
- Reza Fayazi
- Farhad Aslani
- Nematollah Gorji
- Faghiheh Soltani
- Jamshid Esmailkhani
- Nadia Golchin
- Nayereh Farahani
- Mehri Mehrnia
- Abbas Mohebbi
- Mohsen Bonakdar
