= Women's Prison (2002 film) =

Women’s Prison
- Persian: زندان زنان
- Directed by: Manijeh Hekmat
- Written by: Farid Mostafavi
- Produced by: Manijeh Hekmat; Siroos Taslimi
- Starring: Pegah Ahangarani; Roya Teymourian; Golab Adineh; Maryam Boubani; Roya Nonahali; Farkhondeh Farmanizadeh
- Cinematography: Dariush Ayari
- Edited by: Mostafa Kherghehpoosh
- Release date: 7 August 2002
- Running time: 100 Min
- Country: Iran
- Language: Persian

Women’s Prison (Persian: زندان زنان) is a 2002 Iranian drama film directed by Manijeh Hekmat.

== Plot ==
The new head of the prison has new rules for criminals, but Mitra (Roya Nonahali), one of the prisoners who is imprisoned for the murder of her stepfather, does not obey these rules.

== Cast ==
- Pegah Ahangarani
- Roya Teymourian
- Golab Adineh
- Maryam Boubani
- Roya Nonahali
- Farkhondeh Farmanizadeh
- Susan Parvar

== Awards ==
Year	Award	Category	Recipient	Result
2002	Iran Cinema Celebration	Best Film	Manijeh Hekmat	Won
2002	Iran Cinema Celebration	Best script	Farid Mostafavi	Won
2002	Iran Cinema Celebration	Best Actress	Roya Teymourian	Nominated
2002	Iran Cinema Celebration	Best Still Photographer	Amir Abedi	Nominated
2002	Chicago International Film Festival	New Directors Competition	Manijeh Hekmat	Nominated
2003	Fribourg International Film Festival	Special Mention	Manijeh Hekmat	Won
