= The American Side =

2016 film

- Directed by: Jenna Ricker
- Written by: Greg Stuhr; Jenna Ricker
- Starring: Greg Stuhr; Camilla Belle; Alicja Bachleda-Curuś; Matthew Broderick; Janeane Garofalo; Robert Forster; Robert Vaughn; Grant Shaud
- Music by: David Shire
- Production company: Shoreline Entertainment
- Release date: April 28, 2016; (United States)
- Country: United States
- Language: English

The American Side is a 2016 mystery film directed by Jenna Ricker and starring Greg Stuhr and Matthew Broderick.

== Premise ==
After a death at Niagara Falls, a seedy Buffalo private detective unravels a secret plot to build a powerful device conceived by inventor Nikola Tesla.
