= Polaris (2016 film) =

- Directed by: Soudabeh Moradian
- Screenplay by: Soudabeh Moradian; Naghmeh Samini
- Produced by: Christina Jo'Leigh; Mahdi Davari
- Starring: Alicja Bachleda; Bahram radan; Coby Ryan McLaughlin; Elisabeth Röhm; Roya Teymourian; Diane Marshal Green; Rouzbeh Jannatkhah; Tasha Smith
- Cinematography: Pierluigi Malavsi
- Edited by: Cecily Rhett
- Music by: Karen Homayounfar
- Production companies: Cinematic Artistry; Sahara Pictures
- Release date: October 16, 2016 (Toronto CineIran Festival)
- Running time: 92 minutes
- Country: United States
- Languages: English; Persian

Polaris is a multi-cultural feature film based on a script written by Soudabeh Moradian and Naghmeh Samini, and starring Bahram Radan, Alicja Bachleda, Coby Ryan McLaughlin and Roya Teymourian. It's the first U.S. Iranian collaboration produced in the U.S. after the revolution and which received its license to screen theatrically in Iran in 2018. Its theatrical screening commenced in Iran in December 2018 and continued through early summer of 2019.

Polaris portrays a young immigrant journalist, half Iranian-half German, who has PTSD. This is a movie made by women and about women. The writers, producer, director, editor and most of the key crew members behind the scene were women. Polaris awarded the 2020 ReFrame Stamp. Founded by Women In Film and the Sundance Institute, the ReFrame Stamp serves as a mark of distinction to recognize standout films with more women, in front of and behind the camera. Polaris first premièred at TIFF BELL LIGHTBOX in Toronto as part of the 2016 CineIran Film festival. It won the best picture at the Culver city Film festival (2016) and the California Women Film festival (2017) where it was nominated for the best director and best actress as well . Polaris had a limited theatrical release as part of a tour organized by Cinelibre and Zurich IFF across Switzerland in 2017.

== Plot ==
A psychologically traumatized war photographer (Alicja Bachleda)is locked in a desperate struggle with her husband (Bahram Radan)to protect her secrets and escape her inevitable return to the Middle East.

== Cast ==
- Alicja Bachleda as Baran
- Bahram Radan as Poorya
- Coby Ryan McLaughlin as Daniel
- Elisabeth Röhm as Christine
- Diane Marshall-Green as Nina
- Roya Teymourian as Baran's mom
- Tasha Smith as Sophie
- Roozbeh Jannatkhah as Hamed
- Rydell Danzie as Tyler

== Production ==
Principal photography started in November 2014 in Los Angeles, followed by filming in Seattle and wrapped in 14 days. Polaris which is the first US-Iran collaboration was unable to get Iran's governmental permission to be released inside Iran. After two and half years, the government issued a permission for Polaris and it began its screening in Iran on December 12, 2018.

== Release ==
The film had its world premiere at the CineIran film Festival in Toronto - Canada on October 15, 2016. Shortly after, Polaris had its US premier at the Culver City Film Festival (Los Angeles) in December 2016 and won the best picture., Following that, in January 2017, Polaris was nominated for three awards at the California Women Film Festival in Los Angeles: The Best Picture, The Best Director and The Best leading Actress and won the best picture. The other festivals in 2017 that showcased Polaris including: Silicon Beach Film festival, Iranian Film Festival in Zurich and Long Beach indie Film Festival. During Jan and Feb 2017, Polaris had a tour of theatrical screening across Switzerland. The tour was organized by CineLibre and Zurich Iranian Film festival. Polaris also screened theatrically in Iran from December 12, 2018 through early summer of 2019.
