= The Paternal House =

- Directed by: Kianoush Ayari
- Screenplay by: Kianoush Ayari
- Starring: Mehdi Hashemi; Shahab Hosseini; Mehran Rajabi
- Cinematography: Dariush Ayari
- Edited by: Kianoush Ayari; Farhad Ghodsi
- Music by: Behzad Abdi
- Release date: 2012
- Language: Persian

The Paternal House (Persian: خانه پدری, romanized: Khanéh Pedari) is a 2012 Iranian drama film written and directed by Kianoush Ayari. It was entered in the Orizzonti competition at the 69th Venice International Film Festival. It was also screened at the 2014 Edinburgh International Film Festival. In 2012 and again in 2015, the film was officially banned from screenings by the Iranian authorities. The film won the Iran's Film Critics and Writers Association Awards for best director and best script.

== Cast ==
- Mehdi Hashemi as Mohtasham
  - Naser Hashemi as Adult Mohtasham
- Shahab Hosseini as Naser
- Mehran Rajabi as Kalb Hassan
- Nazanin Farahani as Masumeh
- Mina Sadati as Maryam
- Negah Khaghani as Molook
