= The Abadanis =

Film directed by Kyanoush Ayari

The Abadanis is a 1993 film by the Iranian director Kianoush Ayari. Ayari was also the screenwriter. The movie starred Saeed Poursamimi, Hassan Rezai and Saeed Sheikhzadeh. The film is an example of Sacred Defence cinema, i.e. cinema about the Iran-Iraq war. It won the Silver Leopard at the Locarno International Film Festival and was also nominated at the Nantes Three Continents Festival in 1994.
