= I Am a Mother =

- Directed by: Fereydoun Jeyrani
- Written by: Leila Larijani; Rahman Seifi Azad
- Produced by: Gholam reza Mousavi
- Starring: Baran Kosari; Farhad Aslani; Pantea Bahram; Habib Rezaei; Hengameh Ghaziani
- Cinematography: Morteza Ghafouri
- Edited by: Bahram Dehghan
- Music by: Karen Homayounfar
- Release date: 2012
- Running time: 97 minutes
- Country: Iran
- Language: Persian

I Am a Mother (Persian: من مادر هستم, romanized: Man Madar Hastam) is a 2012 Iranian drama film directed by Fereydoun Jeyrani.

== Cast ==
Actor	Role
Baran Kosari	Ava
Habib Rezaei	Saeid
Farhad Aslani	Nader
Hengameh Ghaziani	Nahid
Amir Hossein Arman	Pedram
Pantea Bahram	Simin
