= Fereydoun Jeyrani =

Iranian film director, screenwriter and television presenter

- فریدون جیرانی
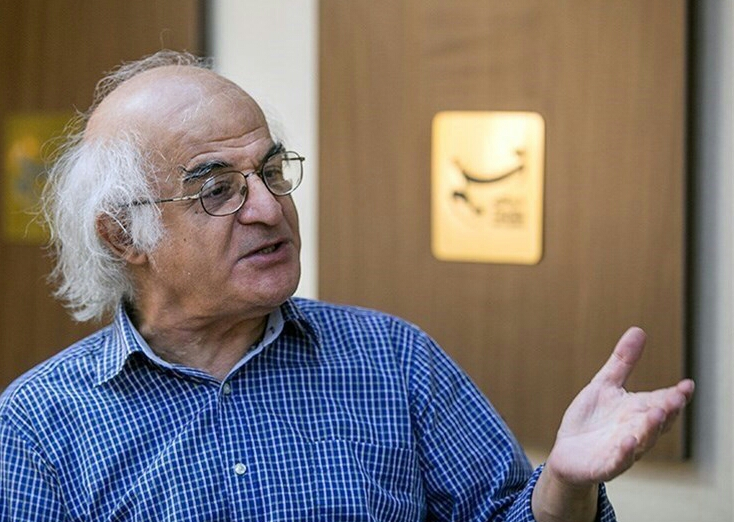
- Born: 28/02/1951; Bardaskan, Imperial State of Iran
- Occupations: Film Director, Screenwriter, Television presenter, Executive

Fereydoun Jeyrani (Persian: فریدون جیرانی; born in 1951, Kashmar) is an Iranian film director, screenwriter, and television presenter. He was the director, producer and host of the first series of Haft (Seven), an Iranian television series about Iranian cinema, until 2012. Along with his unconventional performance in Haft, he is best known for directing Red, The Season Salad, Water and Fire, Pink and I Am a Mother.

== Filmography ==
Year	Film	Credited as			Notes
Year	Film	Director	Producer	Writer	Notes
2019	Blue Whale	Yes	No	No	Home Video series
2018	The Agitation	Yes	Yes	Yes	
2017	Asphyxia	Yes	Yes	Yes	
2015	Misunderstanding of a dream	Yes	No	Yes	TV series
2013	The Sleepy Ones	Yes	No	No	
2010	A Travel to Paradise	Yes	Yes	Yes	
2010	I am a Mother	Yes	No	No	
2010	A Fairy Tale	Yes	No	No	
2008	The Gradual Death of a Dream	Yes	No	No	TV series
2006	Parkway	Yes	No	Yes	
2005	Zagros	No	No	Yes	Directed by: Mohammad Ali Najafi
2005	The Stars Trilogy: Part 1: Will be a star	Yes	No	Yes	
2005	The Stars Trilogy: Part 2: Is a starr	Yes	No	Yes	
2005	The Stars Trilogy: Part3: Was a star	Yes	No	Yes	
2004	The Season Salad	Yes	No	Yes	
2002	Soorati	Yes	No	Yes	
2001	The Last Supper	Yes	No	Yes	
2000	Water and Fire	Yes	No	Yes	
1998	Red	Yes	No	Yes	
1995	Like a Stranger	No	No	Yes	Directed by: Ahmad Amini
1995	Tear and Smile	No	No	Yes	Directed by: Shapoor Gharib
1994	In Cold Blood	No	No	Yes	Directed by: Siamak Shayeghi
1992	Two Fellow Travelers	No	No	Yes	Directed by: Asghar Hashemi
1992	The Escape	No	No	Yes	Directed by: Nasser Mehdipoor
1991	Nargess	No	No	Yes	Directed by: Rakhshan Bani-Etemad
1990	In Hopes of Marriage	No	No	Yes	Directed by: Asghar Hashemi
1989	Under the Roofs of the City	No	No	Yes	Directed by: Asghar Hashemi
1988	The Night of Accident	No	No	No	Written and Directed by: Sirus Alvand, Based on a Story by Jeyrani
1987	The Ascent	Yes	No	No	
1986	The Last Image	No	No	Yes	Co-written and directed by: Mehdi Sabbaghzadeh
1985	Lost	No	No	Yes	Co-written and directed by: Mehdi Sabbaghzadeh
1984	The Chrysanthemums	No	No	Yes	Directed by: Rasul Sadr Ameli
1983	The File	No	No	Yes	Co-written and directed by: Mehdi Sabbaghzadeh
1983	Senator	No	No	Yes	Directed by: Mehdi Sabbaghzadeh
1982	Liberation	No	No	Yes	Co-written and Directed by: Rasul Sadr Ameli
1981	The Lazybones	No	No	Yes	Co-written and Directed by: Rasul Sadr Ameli
