= Azita Moguie =

Iranian director

- آزیتا موگویی
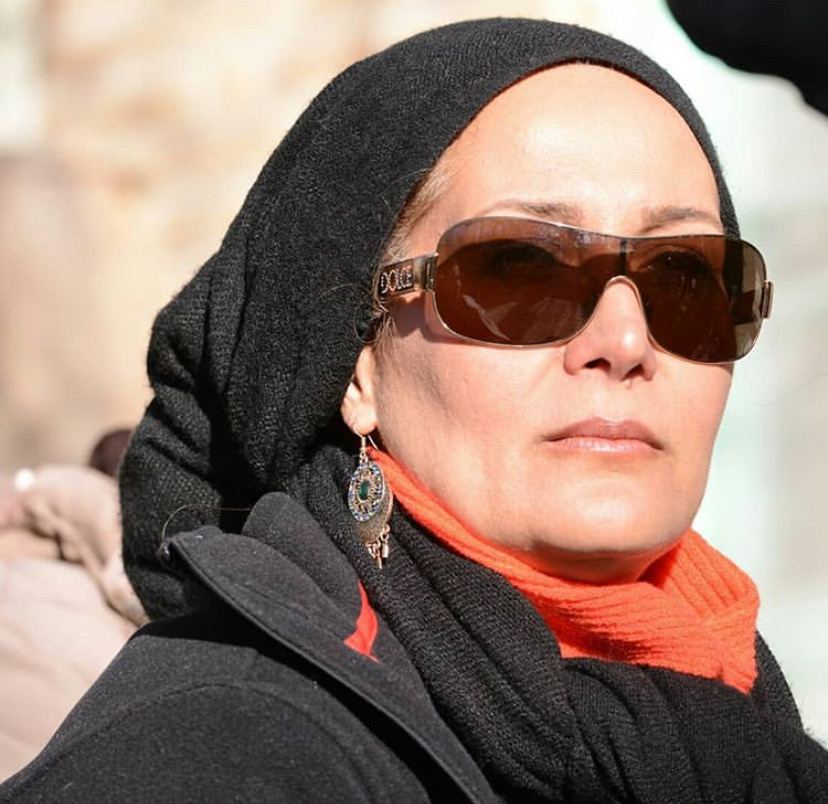
- Azita Moguie Iranian Director
- Born: 22 November 1965 (age 60); Tehran, Iran
- Occupations: Director, Producer, Production Manager

Azita Moguie (Persian: آزیتا موگویی; born November 22, 1965, in Tehran, Iran) is an Iranian Director, Producer, and Production Manager. She start her directing career with the film Tragedy. Her second film as director was Ideh Asli. Moguie was line producer in Son of Adam Daughter of Eve (2010).

== Career ==
- Ideh Asli
- Vaghti Bargashtam
- Hekayat Asheghi
- Tragedy
- Farzand 4om
- Adam kosh
- En-ekas
- Pesare Adam - Dokhatre Hava
- Zane Dovom
- Chocolate
- Hezaran Zan Mesle Man
- Dasthaye Aloode
- Eshgh 2+
- Saghar
