= Tales (film) =

2014 film

- Film poster
- Directed by: Rakhshan Bani-E'temad
- Written by: Rakhshan Bani-E'temad; Farid Mostafavi
- Starring: Habib Rezaei
- Cinematography: Koohyar Kalari
- Release date: 28 August 2014 (Venice)
- Running time: 88 minutes
- Country: Iran
- Language: Persian

Tales (Persian: قصه‌ها Ghesse-ha) is a 2014 Iranian drama film directed by Rakhshan Bani-E'temad. It contains seven tales about different people. It was selected to compete for the Golden Lion at the 71st Venice International Film Festival, where it won the award for Best Screenplay. It was also screened in the Contemporary World Cinema section at the 2014 Toronto International Film Festival.

== Cast ==
- Habib Rezaei
- Mohammad Reza Forutan
- Mehraveh Sharifinia
- Golab Adineh
- Mehdi Hashemi
- Babak Hamidian
- Peyman Moaadi
