= A Cube of Sugar =

2011 film

- DVD cover
- Directed by: Seyyed Reza Mir-Karimi
- Written by: Seyyed Reza Mir-Karimi; Mohammad Reza Gohari
- Produced by: Seyyed Reza Mir-Karimi
- Starring: Negar Javaherian; Reza Kianian; Saeed Poursamimi; Farhad Aslani
- Cinematography: Hamid Khozouie Abyaneh
- Edited by: Hassan Hassandoost
- Music by: Mohammad Reza Aligholi
- Release date: 8 October 2011 (BIFF)
- Running time: 116 minutes
- Country: Iran
- Language: Persian

A Cube of Sugar (Persian: یک حبه قند, Yek Habbeh Ghand or Ye Habbeh Ghand) is a 2011 Iranian drama film directed by Seyyed Reza Mir-Karimi. It had its world premiere at the Busan International Film Festival on 8 October 2011.

On 24 September 2012, the film was selected as the Iranian entry for the Best Foreign Language Oscar at the 85th Academy Awards. However, on the same day, the head of Iran's government-controlled cinema agency called for a boycott of the Oscars due to a video on YouTube titled Innocence of Muslims that originated in the United States. Reuters reported that Iran's Culture and Islamic Guidance Minister Mohammad Hosseini had confirmed that Iran would boycott.

== Plot ==
The film features two concurrent stories: the main plot centering on Pasandideh, and a subplot focusing on Hormoz. The main plot chronicles a day of life in a very traditional Iranian family. Pasandideh, the youngest girl in the family, lives with her mother, her old uncle, and aunt. They live in an old house in a village. She is soon supposed to marry a family friend's grandson, who is studying abroad in a western country. Everything is already arranged for Pasandideh's marriage, and all of her sisters arrive at the old house one by one.

Meanwhile, Hormoz, the husband of Pasandideh's sister, has recently been released from prison. With the aid of Hamid, the husband of another sister of Pasandideh, he tries to find a treasure. They believe it is buried somewhere in Pasandideh's house and sneak around while the marriage ceremony is taking place.

== Cast ==
- Puneh Abdolkarim-Zadeh as Shamsi
- Amir Hossein Arman as Ghasem
- Farhad Aslani as Haj Naser
- Shamsi Fazlollahi as Uncle's wife
- Hedayat Hashemi as Hamid
- Asghar Hemmat as Hormoz
- Negar Javaherian as Pasandideh
- Reza Kianian as Jafar
- Baran Kosari as Grooms Relative
- Rohullah Mofidi as Doctor
- Parivash Nazarieh as Masumeh
- Saeed Poursamimi as Uncle Ezzatolah
- Rima Raminfar as Azam
- Sheida Khaligh as Marzieh

== Release ==
Acclaimed film producer Abbas Kiarostami designed one of the posters that was used to promote A Cube of Sugar.

=== Awards and accolades ===
- Iran Cinema Celebration:
  - Won: Best Poster
  - Nominated: Best Film (Reza Mirkarimi), Best Director (Mirkarimi), Best Actor (Saeed Poursamimi)
- Fajr Film Festival 2011: Best Costume Design (nominated)
- Fajr Film Festival 2011: Best Soundboard (Bahman Ardalan, nominated)
- Fajr Film Festival 2011: Best Actress (Rima Raminfar, nominated)

== See also ==
- List of submissions to the 85th Academy Awards for Best Foreign Language Film
- List of Iranian submissions for the Academy Award for Best Foreign Language Film
