= Kianoush Ayari =

Iranian film director and film editor

- کیانوش عیاری
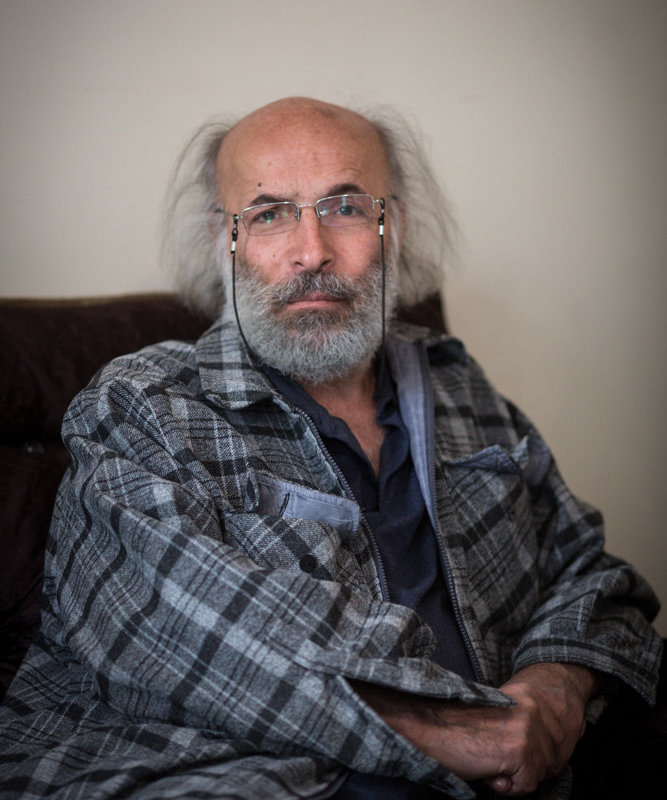
- Ayari in 2016
- Born: May 14, 1951 (age 74); Ahvaz, Iran
- Occupations: Director; screenwriter; editor
- Years active: 1970–present

Kianoush Ayari (Persian: کیانوش عیاری; born May 14, 1951) is an Iranian director and screenwriter. He is famous for his realistic style and unique stories like heart transplantation in his movie To Be or Not to Be (1998) or fate of a teacher after the horrible Bam earthquake in Wake Up, Arezoo! (2005). He has received various accolades, including four Crystal Simorgh, a Hafez Award, two Iran Cinema Celebration Awards and three Iran's Film Critics and Writers Association Awards.

== Life and career ==
He was born in the city of Ahvaz, southwest of Iran. Ayari started his cinematic career by making 8mm short films. His first professional movie was Tanooreyeh Div. His movie Abadani-ha won the Silver Leopard for the best Movie at Locarno Film Festival in 1994. His most controversial movie The Paternal House was screened at 69th Venice Film Festival but yet to be screened publicly in Iran as of december 2016 but was screened at a few cinemas in United States of America. Mehdi Hashemi, one of the best actors of Iranian theatre and cinema has played the main actor role in his movies for the last two decades, including: Thousand Eyes (TV Series), Roozegar-e Gharib (TV Series), The Paternal House and his latest movie Kanape'.

== Personal life ==
His brother Dariush Ayari is a cinematographer. They collaborated in Thousand Eyes (TV Series), Roozegar-e Gharib (TV Series) and The Paternal House.

On February 3, 2026, Ayari was among several figures in the Iranian film industry who signed a statement supporting the 2025–2026 Iranian protests and condemning the government's response to them.

== Filmography ==
=== Cinema ===
- Taze-nafas-ha (1979)
- Tanooreyeh Div (1985)
- The Spirit of Scorpion (1986)
- The Grand Day (1988)
- Beyond the Fire (1990)
- Two Halves of an Apple (1991)
- The Abadanis (1993)
- Cow's Horn (1995)
- To Be or Not to Be (1998)
- Iranian Spread (2002)
- Wake up, Arezoo! (2004)
- The Paternal House (2012)
- Canape' (2016)

=== TV Series ===
- Thousand Eyes (2003)
- Roozegar-e Gharib (2007)

== Awards ==
Here is a list of awards received by Kianoush Ayari in film festivals:

Year	Festival	Award	Nominated work	Result
1985	4th Fajr Film Festival	Best Director	Tanooreyeh Div	Won
1987	6th Fajr Film Festival	Best Director	Ansuyeh Atash	Won
1994	Locarno International Film Festival	Silver Leopard	Abadani-Ha	Won
1994	Nantes Three Continents Festival	Golden Montgolfiere	Abadani-Ha	Nominated
1998	Cairo International Film Festival	Best Screenplay	Boodan yaa naboodan	Won
1998	Cairo International Film Festival	Golden Pyramid	Boodan yaa naboodan	Nominated
2002	Karlovy Vary International Film Festival	Crystal Globe	Sofreh Irani	Nominated
2004	23rd Fajr Film Festival	Best Director	Bidar show, Arezoo!	Won
2004	23rd Fajr Film Festival	Best Art Achievement	Bidar show, Arezoo!	Won
2012	Venice Film Festival	Venice Horizons Award	The Paternal House	Nominated

== See also ==
- Iranian New Wave
- Cinema of Iran
- Mehdi Hashemi
