= Soorati =

- Produced by: Gholamreza Moosavi
- Cinematography: Mohammad Aladpoush
- Edited by: Nazanin Mofakham
- Music by: Vartan Sahakian
- Release date: 2003
- Running time: 98 minutes
- Country: Iran
- Language: Persian

Soorati (2003; English title: Pink) is an Iranian comedy-drama film. It was written and directed by Fereydoun Jeyrani and starred Mitra Hajjar and Rambod Javan in the principal roles. It tells the story of Amirhossein, a little boy who has to live through the divorce of his artistic parents. Hajjar and Javan played the role of the mother (Sahar) and the father (Shahram) respectively. Faghiheh Soltani appeared as the actress Leyla, the new love interest of Shahram, while Reza Shafi Jam played his best friend.

Hajjar was nominated for Best Actress at the Fajr Film Festival, while Jeyrani's script was nominated for the Crystal Simorgh for Best Screenplay.
