= Mehdi Hashemi (actor) =

Iranian actor

Mehdi Hashemi مهدی هاشمی
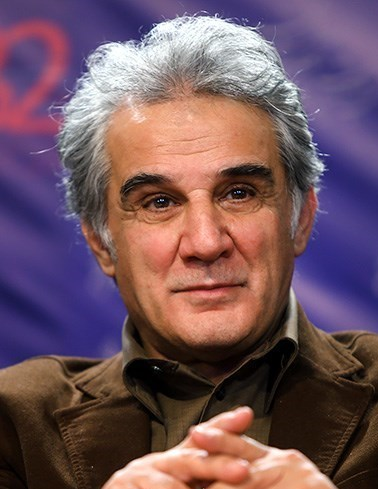
- Hashemi at 32nd Fajr
- Born: 7 December 1946 (age 79); Langarud, Iran
- Education: University of Tehran
- Occupations: Actor, Screenwriter, and Director
- Years active: 1969–present
- Spouse(s): Golab Adineh (m. 1981) Mahnoosh Sadeghi
- Children: 1
- Awards: Fajr Film Festival best actor (1991)

Mehdi Hashemi (Persian: مهدی هاشمی, also Romanized as Mehdī Hāshemī, Persian pronunciation: [mehˈdiː hɒːʃeˈmiː], born 7 December 1946) is an Iranian actor, screenwriter, and director.

He also is the winner of the ninth International Fajr Film Festival award, Crystal Simorgh, for his playing in the film Do Film Ba Yek Belit (translates "one ticket for two movies").

== Personal life ==
He is the husband of Iranian actress, Golab Adineh, and brother of Nasser Hashemi.

== Selected filmography ==
- Zende bad (Long Live) (1979)
- Death of Yazdgerd (1982)
- Kharej az mahdudeh (1986)
- Bogzar zendegi konam (Let me Live) (1986)
- Qaribe (The Alien) (1987)
- Zard-e qanari (Canary Yellow) (1988)
- Shekar-e khamush (The Silent Hunt) (1990)
- Do film ba yek belit (Two Films with one Ticket) (1990)
- Ali va ghul-e jangal (Ali and the Forest Giant) (1990)
- Behtarin baba-ye donya (The Best Father in the World) (1991)
- Aqa-ye bakhshdar (1991)
- Once Upon a Time, Cinema (1992)
- Hamsar (The Spouse) (1994)
- Alo!Alo! Man jujuam (Halo! Halo! I am Joohjoo) (1994)
- Moujeze-ye khandeh (The Miracle of Laughter) (1996)
- Ruz-e karnameh (Report Card Day) (2003)
- Hich (Nothing) (2010)
- Hich 2 (2010)
- Alzheimer (2011)
- The Paternal House (2012)
- Tales (2014)
- In Search of Peace (2016-2017)
