= Under the Skin of the City =

2001 film

- Directed by: Rakhshan Bani-E'temad
- Written by: Rakhshan Bani-E'temad
- Produced by: Rakhshan Bani-E'temad
- Starring: Golab Adineh; Mohammad Reza Forutan
- Cinematography: Hossein Jafarian
- Release date: 4 February 2001
- Running time: 92 minutes
- Country: Iran
- Language: Persian

Under the Skin of the City (Persian: زیر پوست شهر, Zir-e poost-e shahr), also released as Under the City's Skin, is a 2001 Iranian drama film directed by Rakhshan Bani-E'temad. It was entered into the 23rd Moscow International Film Festival where it won the Special Golden St. George.

Adapted from this movie, another short film called "Zir Posht Shahr Tehran", directed by Abolfazl Amiri, was made in 2022 Iranian Date 1400 2.

== Plot ==
Tooba, a working-class woman who leads a life of poverty, lives in Tehran with her husband, daughter, Mahboubeh, and sons, Abbas and Ali. Ali, who is the youngest son and teaches Tooba how to read during the sixth House of Representatives elections, is interested in his country's political issues and is involved in campaigning despite his father's warnings. From time to time, Ali is dragged to the police station for his political participation. Tooba has asthma as a result of working without protections at a textile factory.

The eldest son, Abbas, works in a clothing shop and dreams of traveling to Japan to help financially provide for his family. He aspires to the love of a girl who works at a nearby business. The older daughter of the family is pregnant and returns to the family home with her young daughter after being beaten by her husband. Tooba later returns her to her husband's home, urging her to stay with him despite her siblings' protests. Abbas and his father, in Tooba's absence, give the deed’s house to the "architect", who has been attempting to buy their home. While Tooba's neighbor and colleague at the factory, Maryam, is preparing to celebrate her eldest daughter Somaya's wedding, her young daughter, Masoumeh, runs away from home in response to being abused by her brother for returning home late. Mahboubeh, who is best friends with Masoumeh, visits her discreetly in Mellat Park to bring her home. However, while leaving the Park, Mahboubeh is arrested by the police and taken to the police station.

After finding out about Mahboubeh's imprisonment, Tooba plans to pawn the house deed in exchange for her daughter's release, but realizes that the deed is no longer at the home. Tooba confronts the architect but is unable to get the deed back. Attempting to set things straight, Abbas decides to use the money he has been investing toward his Japan travel expenses to bail his sister out. Upon returning to the visa office, which he was paying to acquire his travel documents, he finds the building vacant and realizes it was illegitimate. Attempting to make quick money, Abbas resorts to working for a local drug trafficker who gives him the money to bail out Mahboubeh in exchange for smuggling drugs into the city. Once his sister is home, Abbas leaves for Orumieh to fulfill his end of the bargain, delivering clothes embedded with drugs. On his way, he finds out that Ali has stowed away in the back of the truck he is driving, out of concern for Abbas' safety, and he beats Ali for his interference.

Leaving the job incomplete, Abbas decides to hide out in the city and is visited by Tooba, who gives him the rest of the family's savings and advises him to flee. During the visit, his boss locates him, but Abbas escapes with his mother's help. In the final scene, Tooba speaks to documentarians on Election Day, telling them that it is better to shoot a video from inside her heart.

== Cast ==
- Golab Adineh as Tooba
- Mohammad Reza Forutan as Abbas
- Baran Kosari as Mahboubeh
- Ebrahin Sheibani as Ali
- Mohsen Ghazi Moradi as Mahmoud the Father
- Mehraveh Sharifinia as Masoumeh
- Homeira Riazi as Hamideh
- Alireza Oosivand as Nasser Khan
- Mehrdad Falahatger as Marandi
- Nazanin Farahani as Nahid
