= Golab Adineh =

Iranian actress (born 1953)

- گلاب آدینه
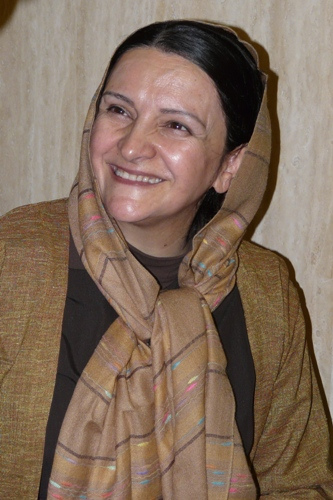
- Adineh in 2008
- Born: Golab Mosta'an; 13 November 1953 (age 72); Tehran, Iran
- Education: Shahid Beheshti University
- Occupation: Actress
- Years active: 1976–present
- Spouse: Mehdi Hashemi (divorced)
- Children: 1

Golab Mosta'an (Persian: گلاب مستعان; 13 November 1953) is an Iranian actress, known professionally as Golab Adineh. She is the daughter of novelist Hosseingholi Mostaan and began her career in the 1970s. Adineh won the Crystal Simorgh for Best Supporting Actress at the Fajr Film Festival for her role in Blue Scarf in1995. She has also been nominated for the Crystal Simorgh for Best Actress for her performances in Canary Yellow (1989), Mom's Guest (2004), When We Were All Asleep (2006), and I Am Diego Maradona (2015).

== Early life and education ==
Golab Adineh was born on 13 November 1953 in Tehran, Iran. She graduated with a degree in political economy from the National University of Iran (now Shahid Beheshti University).

== Career ==
Adineh began her artistic career in 1975 with the student theatre group "Piyadeh," led by Mehdi Hashemi and Dariush Farhang. She performed in several plays, including An Untold Story, Fellow Citizen, Memories and Nightmares of a Wardrobe Keeper from the Life and Death of Amir Kabir, The Great Wall of China, The Caucasian Chalk Circle, Pouf!!, Madame Pee Pee, and It Doesn't Snow in Egypt. She also directed productions such as Sultan Snake, Death of Yazdgerd, A Night in Tehran, and The Veil House.

Her television work includes acting in the series The Legend of the Sultan and the Shepherd and directing the 50-episode series Suitors. Adineh has also served as a casting director and acting coach for various television projects. Her first cinematic experience was acting and serving as a script supervisor in the short film Rasoul, Son of Abolghasem, directed by Dariush Farhang.

Between 1989 and 1998, Adineh taught acting to various age groups at schools and institutions, including the Children's and Adolescents' Art and Literature School affiliated with IRIB. During this period, she staged plays such as Friendship Flower, A Beautiful Day, Memory, and Good News.

Adineh has directed several plays by Behram Beyzai, including Death of Yazdgerd, Sultan Snake, and The Veil House. In 1992, she directed Death of Yazdgerd for the 10th Fajr International Theatre Festival, where it was performed alongside works such as Moon Shadow (directed by Anushirvan Arjmand), Beloved (written and directed by Hossein Nouri), The Tale of the Magic Dowry (written by Mohammad Charmshir and directed by Atila Pessyani), and Mal-Konun (written and directed by Maryam Motaref and Ezzatollah Mehravaran).

== 2022 protests ==
On 6 December 2022, following a performance of The Veil House, which she directed, Adineh appeared on stage without a mandatory hijab and took photos with audiences outside the theatre.

== Filmography ==
- Soltan-O-Shaban (1981-1984)
- Canary Yellow (film) (1988)
- Rusari Abi' (1995, aka The Blue Veiled)
- Mojezeye khandeh (1996)
- Fasl-e panjom (1997, aka The Fifth Season)
- Banoo-ye Ordibehesht (1998 - aka The May Lady)
- Zir-e poost-e shahr (2001, aka Under the Skin of the city)
- Zendan-e Zanan (2002, aka Women's Prison)
- Mehman-e Maman (2004, aka Mom's Guest)
- Tales (2014)

== Theater ==
- The Sad Widows of the Warlord
- Death of Yazdgerd, Director
- Soltan mar' (1998), Director
- Shabi dar Tehran (1999), Director
- Madam Pipi' (1999), Actress
- Dastanhaie wiani (2000), Actress
- Gilgamesh (2002), Actress
- Medea (2004)
- Dar mesr barf nemibarad
- Shir haye KhanBaba Saltane, Actress
- Banooye Mahboob Man(2022), Director
