= Rakhshān Banietemad =

Iranian film director and screenwriter

Rakhshan Banietemad رخشان بنی‌اعتماد
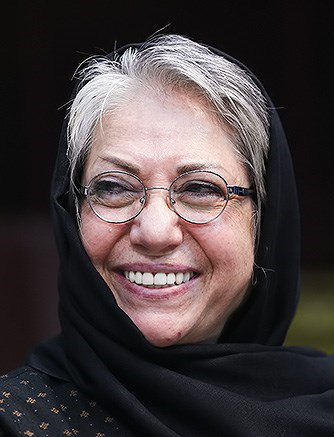
- Banietemad, March 2014
- Born: Rakhshan Banietemad; April 3, 1954 (age 72); Tehran, Iran
- Occupations: Film director Producer; Screenwriter
- Spouse: Jahangir Kosari (1979–present)
- Children: Baran (b. 1985); Tandis (b. 1975)

Rakhshān Banietemad (Persian: رخشان بنی‌اعتماد; born April 3, 1954, in Tehran, Iran) is an Iranian film director and screenwriter. She is often referred to as the "First Lady of Iranian Cinema" due to her prominent role in the country's film industry and her ability to merge political themes with personal and family narratives in her work. Banietemad is known for exploring societal issues through characters, who often represent various segments of Iranian society.

Her films often address a wide range of issues such as: the evolving roles of women, poverty, war, domestic abuse, social mobility, and balancing a portrayal of harsh realities with a sense of hope for change.

Banietemad's films frequently focus on women, with characters such as Tooba (Golab Adineh), Nobar (Fatemah Motamed-Aria), and Sara (Baran Kosari) representing different facets of women's experiences in Iran. These characters are often revisited and reinterpreted over time, reflecting the changes in Iranian society and culture.

Her 2002 film OurTimes (Ruz-egar-e ma) became the first documentary to be released in theaters in Iran.

== Early life and education ==
Rakhshan Banietemad was born in Tehran, Iran, on April 3, 1954, into a middle-class family. Although her parents encouraged her to pursue a career in teaching, she demonstrated an interest in film from a young age. As a teenager, she decided to study film, and earned a Bachelor of Arts in film studies from the Dramatic Arts University in Tehran. Initially, Banietemad had planned to study architecture. Just before entering university, she took an exam for an intensive stage assistance course by the School of Television and Cinema, and was one of the 20 students accepted. She studied both architecture and stage assistance, but the following year, she took the national exam for the faculty of dramatic arts and chose to focus on film directing.

== Career ==
=== 1970s and 1980s ===
In 1973, after completing her degree, Banietemad began working as a script supervisor for the Iranian television network IRIB (Islamic Republic of Iran Broadcasting). Later, in 1980, she directed television documentary features. Her films are steeped in Iran's social and economic context.

In 1981, Banietemad began working in cinema as a script supervisor on films such as The Liegemen and Chrysanthemum. She directed her first feature film Off the Limits in 1987. She followed this up Canary Yellow in 1988.

=== 1990s and 2000s ===
She earned critical and popular acclaim in 1991 with Nargess. She received the Best Director Award from the Fajr Film Festival, marking the first time in the history of the festival that a woman was awarded this prize.

Since then, she has received numerous awards for her films, including a Bronze Leopard Award for The Blue-Veiled at the 1995 Locarno Film Festival and, in 2001, won the Best Foreign Language Film Award and the Audience Award at the 2001 Turin Film Festival for Under the Skin of the City (2001).

With her 2002 documentary film Our Times, Banietemad became the first female filmmaker to explicitly confront the Iran-Iraq war, placing her in an important role in Iranian film history. This was also the first documentary ever to be shown in Iranian movie theaters and was also shown in prominent film festivals such as IDFA and Sundance Film Festival. The film was also broadcast on the Franco-German network ARTE. She is considered a political film maker whose films to walk right up to the line of what Iranian censorship codes allow.

Her 2004 film, Gilaneh, considered an anti-war film, was nominated for three Crystal Simorghs at the Fajr Film Festival and won for best make-up and a special jury prize. Fatemeh Motamedaria, who starred in Gilaneh, won best actress.

=== 2010s to Present ===
Banietemad continued to direct films during the early 2010s, including Mainline and Tales. In Tales (2014), Banietemad intertwines seven stories, where notable female characters from her past films reappear, reinforcing the historical and cultural relevance of her work and her impact on the portrayal of women in Iranian cinema. Tales was selected to compete for the Golden Lion at the 71st Venice International Film Festival.

She also continued making documentaries, and has collaborated with young filmmakers in Hey, Humans (2016), and The Karastan film series (2013-2017).

== Style ==
Banietemad’s unique style blends documentary techniques with fictional filmmaking. Her films frequently examine the hardships faced by Iran’s lower classes, single women, single mothers, and complex family dynamics. Often, her characters directly address the camera, contrasting with typical documentary conventions.

Her films also explore the complex relationships between mothers and their children, a theme rooted in her own experience as a mother in Iran. This focus reflects the societal expectations of Iranian women, who often find it difficult to separate their personal lives from their maternal roles within the country’s patriarchal structure.

Banietemad has mentioned that her feature films are often inspired by people she saw during her documentary film-making. For example, the story of Nargess comes from a documentary about homeless women, the character of Touba in Under the Skin of the City (2001) came about from a documentary on working women, and the character of "Kabootar" in the movie The Blue Veiled (1995) was inspired by a harsh woman called "Mr. Ghodrat" (Ghodrat means a power which is a male name).

Banietemad is known for her interest in strong female characters and she views Iranian women as central to the countries future and often highlights their strength and resilience.

Although her work prominently features strong female protagonists, Banietemad rejects being labeled a feminist filmmaker. She has expressed her discomfort with the term, particularly in the Iranian context, where "feminist" carries negative connotations. Instead, she focuses on the broader struggles of society’s lower classes, regardless of gender, and prefers not to be categorized under any specific label.

== Legacy ==
She was awarded an honorary degree from SOAS in 2008.

== Personal life ==
She is married to Iranian film producer Jahangir Kosari. Their daughter, Baran Kosari, is an Iranian film actress. Kosari began acting at a young age and is now a professional actress. She has appeared in her mother's films, as well as those of other Iranian filmmakers.

== Humanitarian actions ==
Banietemad donated her international prize for the movie Ghesseh-ha to build a shelter for homeless women. She also donated some of her awards to help disadvantaged women.

== Filmography ==
=== Feature films ===
Year	Title	Role		
Year	Title	Director	Writer	Producer
1987	Off the Limits (Kharej az Mahdudeh)	Yes		
1988	Canary Yellow (Zard-e Qanari)	Yes		
1989	Foreign Currency (Poul-e Khareji)	Yes		
1991	Nargess	Yes	Yes	Yes
1995	The Blue Veiled (Rusari Abi)	Yes	Yes	
1998	The May Lady (Banu-ye Ordibehesht)	Yes	Yes	
1999	Baran and the Native (Baran va Bumi)	Yes	Yes	
2001	Under the Skin of the City (Zir-e Poost-e Shahr)	Yes	Yes	Yes
2004	Gilaneh	Yes	Yes	
2006	Mainline (Khun Bazi)	Yes	Yes	Yes
2009	Heiran			Yes
2014	Tales (Ghesseh ha)	Yes	Yes	Yes

=== Documentaries ===
- Karestan Documentary films (artistic consultant), 2013–17:
  - Poets of Life
  - Puzzleys
  - Mother of the Earth
  - MAHAK: A World She Founded
  - Friends at Work
  - Flax to Fire
- Hey, Humans (Ay, Adamha), 2016
- One Hour in a Lifetime (Yek saat az yek omr), 2015
- All My Trees (Hameh derakhtan-e man), 2015 which exmained the work of Mahlagha Mallah
- The Other Side of Mirrors (An sooy-e ayeneh ha), 2014
- The Mirrors Recital (Concert-e ayeneh ha), 2014
- The Concert of the Lords of Secrets (concert-e khodavandan-e asrar), 2014
- Mahak My Home (Khaneh man Mahak), a teamwork, 2014
- Keep Children in School (Bacheh ha ra dar madreseh negahdarim), a teamwork, 2012
- The Room No. 202 (Otahgh-e 202), part of Kahrizak 4 Views, 2012
- I’ll see you Tomorrow Elina (Farda mibinamet Elina), 2010
- We Are Half of Iran's Population (Ma nimi az jameiat-e Iranim), 2009
- Angels of the House of Sun (Hayat khalvate khaneh khorshid), 2009
- Second Home (producer), Director: Mahvash Sheikholeslami, 2008
- 3D Carpet (Farsh-e 3 Bodi), Part of "Iranian Carpet", 2007
- Our Times… (Ruzegar-e ma…), 2002
- The Last Visit with Iran Daftari (Akharin didar ba Iran Daftari), 1995
- To Whom Do You Show These Films? (In filmha ra beh ki neshun midin?), 1993
- Spring to Spring (Bahar ta bahar), 1993
- The 1992 Report (Gozaresh-e 71), 1993
- Centralization (Tamarkoz), 1986
- The War Economic Planning (Tadbirha-ye eqtesadi-e jang), 1981
- Occupation of Migrant Peasants in the City (Mohajerin-e roustai dar shahr),1980
- The Culture of Consumption (Farhang-e masrafi), 1979

== Honors and awards ==
Year	Title	Festival	Award	Category	Result	Notes	References
1991	Nargess	10th Fajr International Film Festival	Simorgh	Best Director	Won		
1991	Nargess	10th Fajr International Film Festival	Simorgh	Best Screenplay	Nominated		
1994	The Blue Veiled	13th Fajr International Film Festival	Simorgh	Best Director	Nominated		
1994	The Blue Veiled	13th Fajr International Film Festival	Simorgh	Best Screenplay	Won		
1994	The Blue Veiled	Iranian Cinema Directors Association	Seemeen	Best Director	Won		
1995	The Blue Veiled	Locarno International Film Festival	Bronze Leopard		Won		
1996	The Blue Veiled	Tessaloniki International Film Festival (Greece)	FIPRESCI		Won		
1997	The May Lady	16th Fajr International Film Festival	Special Jury Prize	Best Director	Won		
1998	The May Lady	Montreal World Film Festival	FIPRESCI	Hounarable Mention	Won		
1998	The May Lady	2nd Iranian Cinema Festival		Best Director	Nominated		
2000	Under the Skin of the City	4th Iranian Cinema Festival		The best film selected by the Critics and Writers Association	Nominated		
2000	Under the Skin of the City	4th Iranian Cinema Festival		Best Screenplay	Nominated	Joint with Farid Mostafavi	
2000	Under the Skin of the City	4th Iranian Cinema Festival		Best Film	Nominated		
2000	Under the Skin of the City	4th Iranian Cinema Festival		Best Director	Won		
2000	Under the Skin of the City	Moscow International Film Festival	Special Jury Prize		Won		
2001	Under the Skin of the City	Karlovy Vary International Film Festival (Czech)	Netpac		Won		
2001	Under the Skin of the City	Turin International Film Festival (Italy)		Best Screenplay	Won	Joint with Farid Mostafavi	
2001	Under the Skin of the City	Turin International Film Festival (Italy)		Audience award	Won		
2001	Under the Skin of the City	Turin International Film Festival (Italy)	Cinemavenire	Best Film	Won		
2002	Under the Skin of the City	Seattle International Film Festival		Special Jury Award	Won		
2002	Our Times	Locarno International Film Festival	Netpac		Won		
2005	Gilaneh	Kara International Film Festival		Best Film	Won		
2005	Gilaneh	Iranian Women Film Directors	Golden Lotus		Won		
2005	Gilaneh	10th Holy defense Festival (Iran)	Special Jury Prize	Best Director	Won	Joint with Mohsen Abdul Wahab	
2006	Gilaneh	Vesoul Asian Film Festival (France)	Netpac		Won	Joint with Mohsen Abdul Wahab	
2006	Gilaneh	Las Palmas de Gran Canaria International Film Festival (Spain)	Special Jury Prize		Won		
2007	Mainline	Asia Pacific Screen Awards		Best Director	Won	Joint with Mohsen Abdul Wahab	
2007	Mainline	25th Fajr International Film Festival	Simorgh	Best Screenplay	Won	Joint with Mohsen Abdul Wahab, Farid Mostafavi, Naghme Samini	
2007	Mainline	Asiatica Film Mediale (Italy)		Best Film	Won		
2007	Mainline	City International Film Festival (Iran)		Best Film	Won		
2007	Mainline	11th Iranian Cinema Festival		Best Screenplay	Nominated	Joint with Mohsen Abdul Wahab, Farid Mostafavi, Naghme Samini	
2007	Mainline	11th Iranian Cinema Festival		Best Director	Won	Joint with Mohsen Abdul Wahab	
2008	Mainline	International Women's Film Festival (Creteil, France)	Grand Jury Prize		Won		
2008	Mainline	Pyongyang International Film Festival (North Korea)		Best Screenplay	Won	Joint with Mohsen Abdul Wahab, Farid Mostafavi, Naghme Samini	
2008	Mainline	Dhaka International Film Festival (Pakistan)	Special Jury Prize		Won		
2014	Tales	Venice International Film Festival (Italy)		Best Screenplay	Won	Joint with Farid Mostafavi	
2014	Tales	Kolkata International Film Festival (India)	Golden Royal Bengal Tiger	Best Film	Won		
2014	Tales	Asia Pacific Screen Awards (Australia)	Special Jury Prize		Won		
2014	Tales	32nd Fajr International Film Festival		Best Film	Nominated		
2014	Tales	The 17th Iranian Cinema Festival		Best Film	Nominated		
2014	Tales	The 17th Iranian Cinema Festival		Best Director	Nominated		
2014	Tales	The 17th Iranian Cinema Festival		Best Screenplay	Nominated	Joint with Farid Mostafavi	
2015	Tales	London Iranian Film Festival (UK)		Best Film	Won		
2015	Tales	Gene Siskel Film Center (USA)	Audience Award		Won		
2016	Tales	Prague Iranian Film Festival (Czech)		Best Film	Won		

- Honorary Golden Cyclo, 23rd Vesoul International Film Festival of Asian Cinema (France), 2017
- Ethics and Prayer Award for social and civilian activities (Iran), 2016
- Cinema Honorary Award, 4th International Women Film Festival (Afghanistan), 2016
- Cinema Honorary Award, 6th International Crime & Punishment Film Festival (Turkey), 2016
- Special Jury Prize, Kahrizak 4 views, Dubai International Film Festival (UAE), 2012
- Prix Henri Langlois, Vincennes International Film Festival (France), 2010
- Special Jury Prize, We Are Half of Iran's Population, (WIFTS) (USA), 2009
- Achievement in Directing, Mainline, Asia Pacific Screen Awards (Australia), 2007
- Best Director & Best Actress, Mainline, Iran Cinema House Awards (Iran), 2007
- Artistic & Cultural Achievement Award, Kara International Film Festival (Pakistan), 2004
- Prince Claus Prize for Culture and Development (The Netherlands), 1998
- "Il Sindaco di Firenze” Peace and Freedom Award (Italy), 1998
- Best Asian Woman Director, The Blue Veiled, India International Film Festival (India), 1996
- Best Film, Off the Limits, Comedy International Film Festival (Italy), 1987
- The Prince Claus Award, 1998
- Honorary doctorate, SOAS, University of London (2008)
- Chairperson International jury, at 52nd International Film Festival of India, Goa 2021.

== Professional distinctions ==
- Jury Member, Venice International Film Festival (Italy), 2017
- Academy Oscars Member, Writers Branch, 2017
- President of the jury, Vesoul Film Festival (France), 2017
- President of the jury, Prague Iranian Film Festival (Czech), 2017
- President of the jury, Image Film Festival (Iran), 2016
- President of the jury, Cinema Verite International Film Festival (Iran), 2013
- President of the jury, Busan International Film Festival (South Korea), 2013
- Master Class, California Institute of the Arts (USA), 2013
- Jury Member, Shanghai International Film Festival (China), 2012
- Jury Member, Dubai International Film Festival (UAE), 2010
- Jury Member, Asiatic Film Mediale Festival (Italy), 2010
- Master Class, Walker Art Center, Minneapolis (USA), 2010
- Jury Member, Fribourg International Film Festival (Switzerland), 2010
- Jury Member, Urban International Film Festival (Iran), 2009
- Producer, Heiran, feature-film (Iran), 2009
- Producer, Second House, documentary (Iran), 2008
- Honorary Doctorate, University of London (Iran), 2008
- Master Class, School of Oriental and African Studies, SOAS (England), 2008
- Master Class, Geneva University of Art & Design (ESBA), 2008
- Jury Member, Cinema Verite International Film Festival (Iran), 2007
- Jury Member, Women's Film Festival (Iran), 2006
- Jury Member, Asian Cinema, Fajr International Film Festival (Iran), 2006
- Jury Member, Art University Student Festival (Iran), 2005
- Director, Sony Young Directors Film Festival (Iran), 2003
- Jury Member, Asia Pacific Film Festival (Iran), 2003
- Jury Member, Sony Young Directors Film Festival (Iran), 2002
- Jury Member, Moscow International Film Festival ( Russia), 2002
- Jury Member, Cairo International Film Festival (Egypt), 2002
- Jury Member, Fajr International Film Festival (Iran), 2001
- Jury Member, Montreal World Film Festival (Canada), 2001
- Jury Member, Youth Film Festival (Iran), 2001
- Jury Member, Student Film Festival (Iran), 1999
- Jury Member, Leipzig International Film Festival (Germany), 1999
- Jury Member, Tokyo Environmental International Film Festival (Japan), 1998
- Jury Member, New Delhi International Film Festival (India), 1998
- Jury Member, Student Film Festival (Iran), 1997
- Jury Member, Locarno International Film Festival (Swiss), 1996
- Jury Member, Turin International Film Festival (Italy), 1995
- Jury Member, Center for Iranian Film Directors (Iran), 1993
- Jury Member, Roshd Film Festival (Iran), 1992
- Jury Member, Fajr International Film Festival (Iran), 1990

== See also ==
- Persian women's movement
- Langerood (village of Espili in Gilan)
