= List of Iranian films of the 2000s =

A list of films produced in Iran ordered by year of release in the 2000s. For an alphabetical list of Iranian films, see Category:Iranian films

== 2000s ==
Year	Title	Director	Actors	Genre	Notability
2000	...Va man dar khoshbakhti-e shirin be donya amadam! (aka ...and I was born to sweet delight!)	Kiarash Anvari		Short film	Official selection in international competition section of 48th International Short Film Festival Oberhausen
2000	Blackboards	Samira Makhmalbaf		Drama	Entered into the 2000 Cannes Film Festival
2000	The Circle	Jafar Panahi		Drama	Won Golden Lion at Venice
2000	The Day I Became a Woman	Marzieh Meshkini		Drama	
2000	Smell of Camphor, Scent of Jasmine	Bahman Farmanara	Bahman Farmanara	Drama	
2000	Defenseless generation	Mohammad memari- hojjat baqaee			police film festival/tvducumentryfilms festival2000 sony Film Festival
2000	Djomeh	Hassan Yektapanah			Won Caméra d'Or at Cannes
2000	A Time for Drunken Horses	Bahman Ghobadi		Drama	Won Caméra d'Or at Cannes
2001	ABC Africa	Abbas Kiarostami		Documentary	Screened at the 2001 Cannes Film Festival
2001	Baran	Majid Majidi	Hossein Abedini	Drama	Won the Freedom of Expression Award at the National Board of Review (USA)
2001	Kandahar	Mohsen Makhmalbaf	Nelofer Pazira	Drama	Won the Prize of the Ecumenical Jury at the 2001 Cannes Film Festival
2001	Raye makhfi	Babak Payami		Comedy	
2001	Under the Skin of the City	Rakhshan Bani-E'temad			Entered into the 23rd Moscow International Film Festival
2002	Barefoot to Herat	Majid Majidi		Documentary	Won FIPERSCI Prize
2002	Marooned in Iraq	Bahman Ghobadi		Documentary Drama	Won François Chalais Award at the 2002 Cannes Film Festival
2002	Noora	Mahmoud Shoolizadeh		Drama / Fiction film	Won Best Film award of Taormina Film Festival in Italy
2002	Ten	Abbas Kiarostami		Documentary Drama	Entered into the 2002 Cannes Film Festival
2002	To Stay Alive	Dariush Mehrjui			Screened at the 2002 Cannes Film Festival
2002	Unruled Paper	Nasser Taghvai	Khosrow Shakibai, Hadyeh Tehrani, Jamileh Sheikhi, Jamshid Mashayekhi		
2003	Abadan	Mani Haghighi	Shahrokh Foroutanian, Jamshid Mashayekhi, Fatemeh Motamed Aria, Hedieh Tehrani	Drama	
2003	Crimson Gold	Jafar Panahi		Drama	Screenplay by Abbas Kiarostami
2003	Dancing in the Dust	Asghar Farhadi			Entered into the 25th Moscow International Film Festival
2003	Five	Abbas Kiarostami			Screened at the 2004 Cannes Film Festival
2003	At Five in the Afternoon	Samira Makhmalbaf			Premiered at the 2003 Cannes Film Festival; First film shot in Kabul after invasion
2003	To Have or Not to Have	Niki Karimi		Documentary	Niki Karimi's directional debut
2004	20 Fingers	Mania Akbari	Bijan Daneshmand	Drama	Shot in several long takes on a DV camera
2004	Duel	Ahmad Reza Darvish	Pejman Bazeghi	Drama / War	Biggest budget in the history of the cinema of Iran
2004	Marmoulak	Kamal Tabrizi	Parviz Parastui	Comedy	
2004	Mehman-e Maman	Dariush Mehrjui	Golab Adine, Amin Hayai	Comedy / Drama	Written by Houshang Moradi Kermani
2004	10 on Ten	Abbas Kiarostami			Screened at the 2004 Cannes Film Festival
2004	Left Foot Forward on the Beat	Kazem Ma'asoumi			Entered into the 27th Moscow International Film Festival
2004	Turtles Can Fly	Bahman Ghobadi		Drama / War	The first film made in Iraq after the fall of Saddam Hussein; Won Golden Seashell at San Sebastian International Film Festival
2005	Dame sobh	Hamid Rahmanian	Hossein Yari	Drama	Award-winning
2005	Qatl Online [The Online Kill]	Masoud Abparvar	Hamid Goodarzi, Shahab Hosseini Elnaz Shakerdoost, Jamshid Hashempour, Amir Hossein Arman	Crime/horror thriller	
2005	Maxx	Saman Moghaddam	Mohammad Reza Sharifinia, Pegah Ahangarani	Musical comedy	
2005	Nose, Iranian Style	Mehrdad Oskouei		Documentary	
2005	One Night	Niki Karimi		Drama	Nominated for Prix un certain regard at the 2005 Cannes Film Festival
2005	Requiem of Snow	Jamil Rostami		Drama	The first film to represent Iraq in the Best Foreign Language Film category at the Oscars
2005	So Close, So Far	Reza Mirkarimi		Drama	Won Crystal Simorgh for the Best Film at the 24th Fajr Film Festival; Selected to represent Iran in the Best Foreign Language Film category at the Oscars
2005	Tickets	Abbas Kiarostami; Ken Loach; Ermanno Olmi		Comedy / Drama	
2005	The Willow Tree	Majid Majidi	Parviz Parastui	Drama	
2006	A Few Days Later	Niki Karimi		Drama	Script won the Rotterdam festival's Hubert Bals Fund
2006	Offside	Jafar Panahi		Comedy/Drama/Sport	Won Silver Bear at Berlin Film Festival
2007	Ekhrajiha	Masoud Dehnamaki	Akbar Abdi	Comedy / War	Highest grossing Iranian movie of all time
2007	The Night Bus	Kiomars Pourahmad	Khosrow Shakibai, Mehrdad Sedighian, Mohammad-Reza Foroutan	War	
2007	SANTOURI The Music Man	Dariush Mehrjui	Bahram Radan	Drama |Crystal Simorgh Audience Award & Best Actor in a Leading Role (Bahram Radan) at Fajr Film Festival	
2008	Football Under Cover	David Assmann, Ayat Najafi		Documentary	
2008	As Simple as That	Reza Mirkarimi			Won the Golden George at the 30th Moscow International Film Festival
2008	Nuclear Iran	ali hoseinpoor - hojjat baqaee		Scientific documentary	Attendance at Documentary film contest
2008	The Song of Sparrows	Majid Majidi	Reza Naji	Drama	
2009	No One Knows About Persian Cats	Bahman Ghobadi			Competing in the Un Certain Regard section at the 2009 Cannes Film Festival
2009	Tardid	Varuzh Karim-Masihi	Bahram Radan, Taraneh Alidoosti		Won Crystal Simorgh for Best Film in 27th Fajr Film Festival
2009	Seyghalan	Hojjat Baqaee-Bagher Yekta	Ali Hoseinpoor		Appreciation from the Governor of Gilan - Mayor of Soomehsara - Ministry of Iran Interior - Ministry of Iran Agriculture
2009	About Elly	Asghar Farhadi	Golshifteh Farahani, Taraneh Alidoosti, Shahab Hosseini	Drama	Iran's official selection to compete at the 82nd Academy Awards in the field of Best Foreign Language Film. Won Silver Bear for Best Director at Berlin film festival
2009	The White Meadows	Mohammad Rasoulof	Mohammad Shirvani	Drama	AsiaAfrica Special Jury Prize for Feature Film and Muhr AsiaAfrica Award for Best Actor (Hassan Pourshirazi) at Dubai International Film Festival, Golden Seashell Award at San Sebastián International Film Festival
2009	Checkmate	Jamshid Heidari	Hamid Goodarzi, Elnaz Shakerdoost, Nima Shahrokh Shahi	Romantic comedy	
