= Mahin Bozorgi =

Iranian Voice Actress

- مهین بزرگی
- Born: Fatemeh Abolghasem Tabrizi; June 5, 1928; Tehran, Iran
- Died: June 12, 2009 (aged 81); Tehran, Iran
- Other name: Mahin Bozorgi
- Occupations: Voice actress (dubbing artist); Actress; Radio broadcaster
- Years active: 1951–2007
- Notable work: The Deer (film)(dubbing); The Unwanted Girl(1953)

Mahin Bozorgi (Persian: مهین بزرگی; born Fatemeh Abolghasem Tabrizi; 5 June 1928 – 12 June 2009) was an Iranian voice actress (dubbing artist), stage and film actress, and radio broadcaster. She was one of the first female voice actresses (dubbers) in Iranian cinema.

== Early life ==
Bozorgi was born 5 June 1928 in Tehran. She completed her education up to the secondary-school level. Before finishing high school, she was recruited by dubbing director Ali Kasmai to voice one of the actresses in The Intoxication of Love (dir. Esmail Kooshan, 1951), marking the start of her dubbing career.

== Career ==
She was among the first Iranian female voice actresses working in the dubbing industry. Her specialty was character (typecast) voicing; like fellow dubbers Azar Daneshi and Badri Nourollahi, she typically voiced older and middle-aged women. She most frequently dubbed for actress Parvin Soleimani and other authoritative female characters on screen.

Alongside her dubbing work, from 1963 her voice was also heard on the radio program Dastan-e Shab ("Story of the Night") and in other radio dramas.

She trained as an actress at a performing-arts conservatory and also performed in theatre and several films. Her film roles included The Runaway Girl (1953), Setareha 3: Setareh Boud (2005), and Chand Rooz Ba'd (2006). Her final screen appearance was in the short film Dance on the Pedestrian Bridge, directed by Ehsan Soltanian, in 2007.

== Filmography ==
- The Unwanted Girl (1953)
- Stars 3: It Was a Star (1954)
- A Few Days Later (2006)

== voice actress ==
Some of Mahin Bozorgi's Works
actress	Role	Film
BKatharine Hepburn	Rose Sayer	The African Queen
Jane Wyman	Helen Phillips	Magnificent Obsession (1954 film)
Leopoldine Konstantin	Madame Anna Sebastian	Notorious (1946 film
Verna Felton	Winifred	The Jungle Book (1967 film)
Kay Tremblay	Eliza Ward	Road to Avonlea
Oshin		

== Death ==
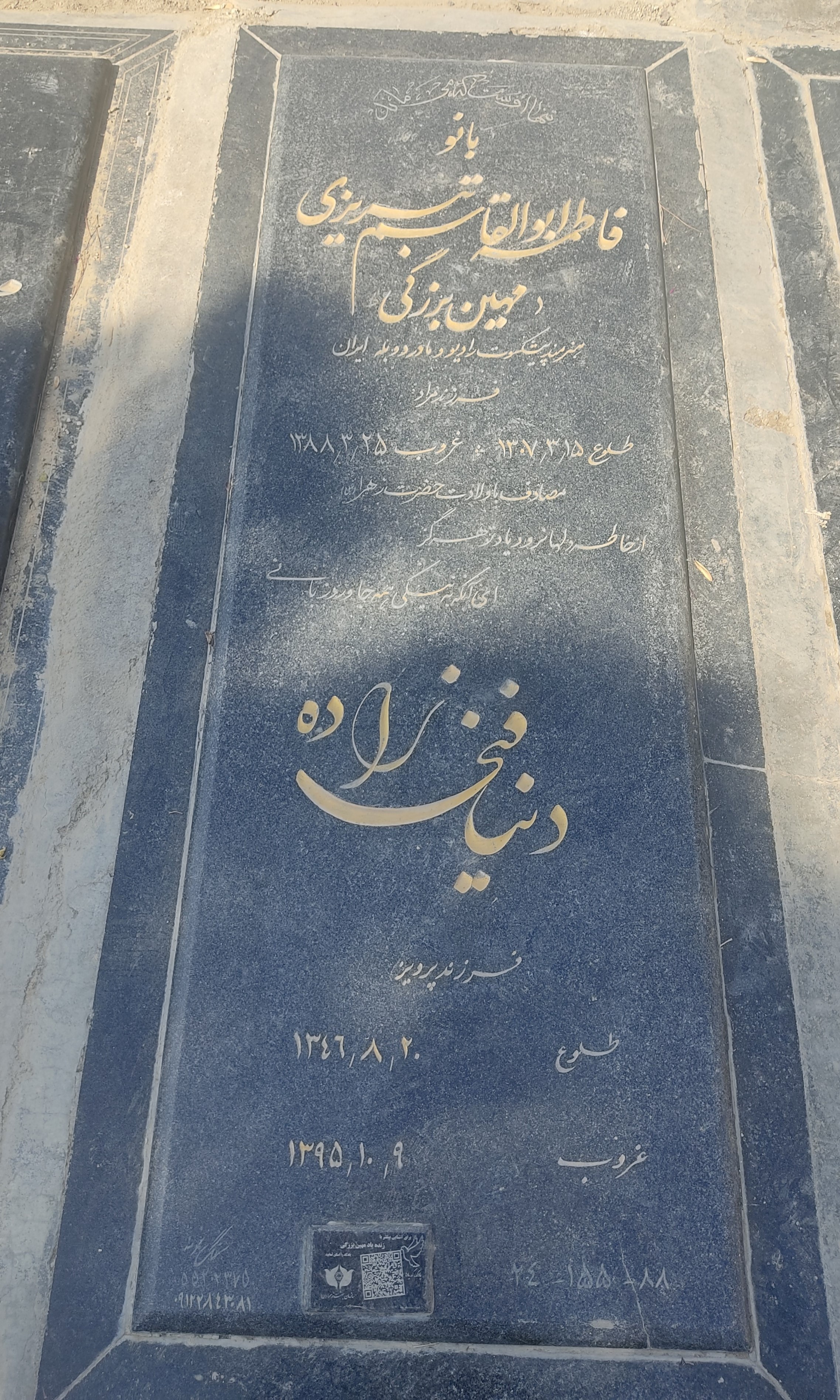
Bozorgi's grave

Mahin Bozorgi who had been hospitalized in a diabetic coma at Resalat Hospital in Tehran, partially regained consciousness before dying on the evening of 12 June 2009. She was buried on 14 June 2009 in the Artists' Section of Behesht-e Zahra Cemetery, Tehran.
