= Nima Aziminejad =

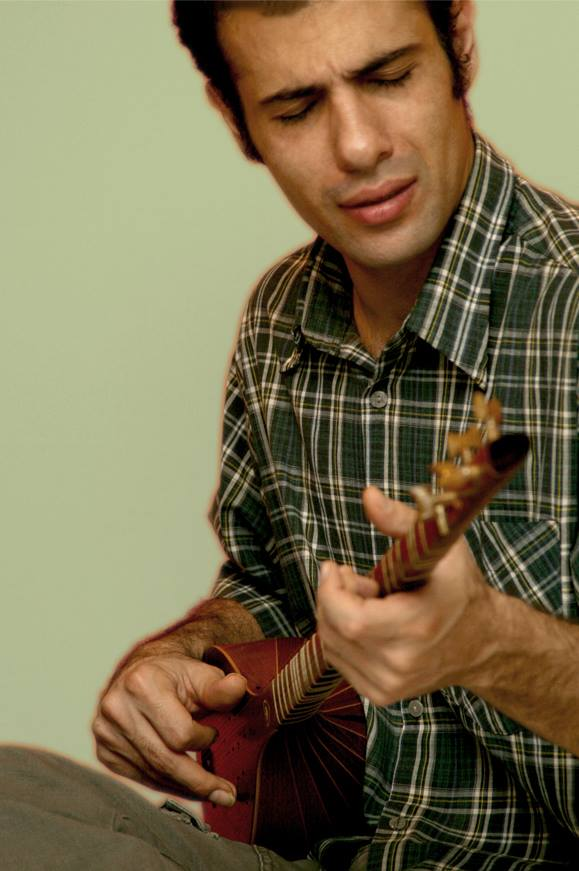

Background information
- Born: Nima Aziminejad(i); September 15, 1978 (age 47); Tehran, Iran
- Origin: Tehran, Iran
- Genres: Iranian Music, Film Music
- Occupations: Professional Setar player, Composer, Movie Music composer Sound engineer
- Instrument: Setar
- Years active: 1996–present

Nima Aziminejad (Persian: نیما عظیمی‌نژاد), (born 15 September 1978) is an Iranian composer, setar player and sound engineer.

== Biography ==
Nima Aziminejad is the son of Jamshid Aziminejad and has been an active figure in the field of satirizing, writing and directing. His TV series Khaneye Aroosakha (House of Puppets) was a highly popular children's show. Nima started learning music from his father and his brother by playing setar at the age of eight. Later on, he attended classes held by masters such as Farhad Fakhreddini, Mohammad-Reza Lotfi, Pashang Kamkar and Keyvan Mirhadi.

At the age of nineteen he began his activities in theatre. He played instruments in Azita Hajian's theatre group Green. After a while he started composing music as an individual composer for theatre and also he had activities in TV such as composing, recording supervisor and music consultant of the “pooya” channel.

Meanwhile, he improved his skill in sound recording learning from Raymond Movsessian and Mohammad Fallahi and received his degree in sound engineering from Fanni va Herfeii Institute.

In 2005 he founded the Arattah ensemble with his friends and there he played his Iranian compositions for the first time. He also learned singing and singing techniques from masters Abdolkarim Paksirat and Mario Taghadossi.

Currently he is active in the Laklak ensemble, composing, playing mainly setar, participating in different music festivals and holding concerts.

== Composing ==
=== Theatre music composer ===
- The Door (Dar) theatre directed by Ali Rahimi (The music is chosen among the top three compositions of the Iranian Association of Theatre Critics in 2004)
- The Rope (Tanab) theatre directed by Ali Rahimi
- The Doll (Aroosak) directed by ali rahimi (it won first place in the Children's Musical Theatre Festival in 2006)
- Who Nobody Knew Him (Kasi ke hichkas nemidanest kist) theatre directed by Daryush Faezi
- 1 woman, 1 man (Yek zan, Yek mard) theatre directed by Azita Hajian and music co-composed with Amir Tavassoli (candidate at the Fajr Theater Festival)
- To Set Goodnight Your Highness Count and Fall Melody (Tanzime shabbekheir jenabe kont va melodye paeezi) theatre directed by Michael Shahrestani
- The Red Cheek (Lop Goli) directed by the Fitileh group for children

=== Composing for TV movies ===
- Niloofar directed by Alireza Akhlaghi production of Mahed movie company
- The Searchers (Kavoshgaran) directed by Hamidreza Naderi

=== Composing for TV series ===
- Shaee, dancing documentary series on the Kurdsat Channel directed by Kaveh Moeinfar
- Adventurous Villa (Vilaye por majara) directed by Mohammadreza Naderi
- Wrath and Peace (Ghahr o ashti) directed by Ahmad Ramezan Zadeh production of Jozan Film company
- Fitileh songs named “The Sun”, “The Summer”, “The Autumn” and “Mouse series”.

=== Composing for video-arts ===
- Motra directed by Farideh Shahsavarani
- The dream of colour (Royaye Rang) directed by Farideh Shahsavarani
- Ashoura directed by Farideh Shahsavarani
- The Birth (Tavalod) directed by Farideh Shahsavarani
- The Stone Caravansary (Karavansaraye Sangi) directed by Siamak Nasiri Ziba
- Cinema’s Deceased of Last Year in the opening ceremony of the Fajr Film Festival directed by Masoud Amini
- Closing ceremony of the Youth Festival
- Multimedia CD for Kanoun Parvaresh Fekri (Intellectual Development Community) directed by Sianoush Nasiri Ziba

=== Composing for animation ===
- AIDS Child (Motevalede AIDS) directed by Neda Shidvash
- Mouse and Snake (Mosh O Mar) directed by Sianoush Nasiri Ziba

== Supervisor recorder of movies ==
- Spy (Nofuzi) directed by Ahmad Kaveri and Mehdi Fiuzi
- Beyond the River (Ansooye roodkhane) directed by Abbas Ahmadi Motlagh
- Gold and Copper (Tala va Mes) directed by Homayoun Asadian

== Supervisor recorder of TV series ==
- The Redeemed (Rastegaran) directed by Sirous Moghadam and composed by Arya Aziminejad
- After Years (Pas az Salha) directed by Akbar Khajouei and composed by Arya Aziminejad
- Day of Regret (Rooze Hasrat) directed by Sirous Moghadam and composed by Arya Aziminejad
- Home (Chardivari) directed by Sirous Moghadam and composed by Arya Aziminejad
- Below Eight (Zire Hasht) directed by Sirous Moghadam and composed by Arya Aziminejad
- Ghazal track sung by Mohammad Esfahani and composed by Arya Aziminejad

== Playing instruments in theatre plays ==
- Over the Mirror (Ansoye Ayeneh) directed by Azita Hajian
- The Wolf and The Ewe (Gorg O Mish) directed by Azita Hajian
- Each Flower has Odour (Har goli ye booei dare) directed by Ali Sadoughi
- Bitter Play of Life ((Talkh bazye ghamar dar aghrab) directed by Shohreh Lorestani
- Azhdahak directed by Vahid Eyvazi
- Three years and a half ((3 sal o yek dovvom) directed by Amir Aghaei

== As player of different musical instruments in series ==
- Setar player in After Years (Pas az salha)
- Bass setar player in Day of Regret (Roze Hasrat)

== Experiences in sound recording ==
=== Sound recording ===
- Shining Sun (Aftabe aalam tab) studio
- Concert of Masters Mohammad-Reza Shajarian, Hossein Alizadeh, Kayhan Kalhor and Homayoun Shajarian (with Raymond Movsessian)
- Concert of Kamkars ensemble (with Raymond Movsessian)
- Concert of master Mohammad-Reza Shajarian, Majid Derakhshani, Hossein Behroozinia, Saeid Farajpouri (with Raymond Movsessian)
- Orchestra of Ebrahim Esbati in Kanoun Parvaresh Fekri (Intellectual Development Community)
- Concert of Saeid Kordmafi in Tehran University
- Concert of Meghdad Shah Hosseini
- Concert of Inak ensemble in Arya Aziminejad’s music school

=== Sound recording of music albums ===
- Merry (Saghi Sarmast) production of Sound of Barbad company
- Improvise (Bedahe Sazi) production of Mahoor Institute of culture and art
