= Orange Days =

Orange Days may refer to:

- Orange Days (film), an Iranian drama film from 2019
- Orange Days (TV series), a Japanese drama series from 2004
