= The Redemption (TV series) =

Television series

- Persian: رستگاران
- Genre: Drama Crime
- Written by: Saeed Nematollah
- Directed by: Siroos Moghaddam
- Starring: Ronak Younesi; Esmaeil Soltanian; Pouria Poursorkh; Atila Pesyani; Abbas Amiri Moghaddam; Saba Kamali; Linda Kiani; Nafiseh Roshan; Afshin Sangchap; Kaveh Khodashenas; Giti Ghasemi; Shahrbanoo Mousavi
- Theme music composer: Mohammad Esfahani
- Composer: Arya Aziminejad
- Country of origin: Iran
- Original language: Persian
- No. of seasons: 1
- No. of episodes: 52

Production
- Producer: Mohammadreza Shafiei
- Production location: Tehran
- Cinematography: Amir Maghouli
- Editor: Khashayar Movahedian
- Running time: 40 minutes

Original release
- Release: 21 March – 26 May 2010

The Redemption (Persian: رستگاران) is an Iranian drama and crime series. The series is directed by Siroos Moghaddam.

== Storyline ==
It tells the life story of a girl named Khojasteh who went to Tehran to find out about her husband "Ahmad Reza" after his disappearance. She finds out that Ahmad Reza was working with a person named Parviz Shayesteh and in the absence of Ahmad Reza, he has signed housing contracts with a large number of people, But now he has disappeared and about five hundred creditors have complained about Ahmad Reza and...

== Cast ==
- Ronak Younesi
- Esmaeil Soltanian
- Pouria Poursorkh
- Atila Pesyani
- Abbas Amiri Moghaddam
- Saba Kamali
- Linda Kiani
- Nafiseh Roshan
- Afshin Sangchap
- Kaveh Khodashenas
- Giti Ghasemi
- Shahrbanoo Mousavi
- Mohammad Omrani
- Zohreh Safavi
- Anahita Afshar
- Abbas Ghazali
- Maryam Soltani
- Shahram Abdoli
- Arash Majidi
- Atefeh Noori
- Maliheh Nikjoomand
- Heshmat Aramideh
