= Sara (1993 film) =

1993 Iranian motion picture directed by Dariush Mehrjui

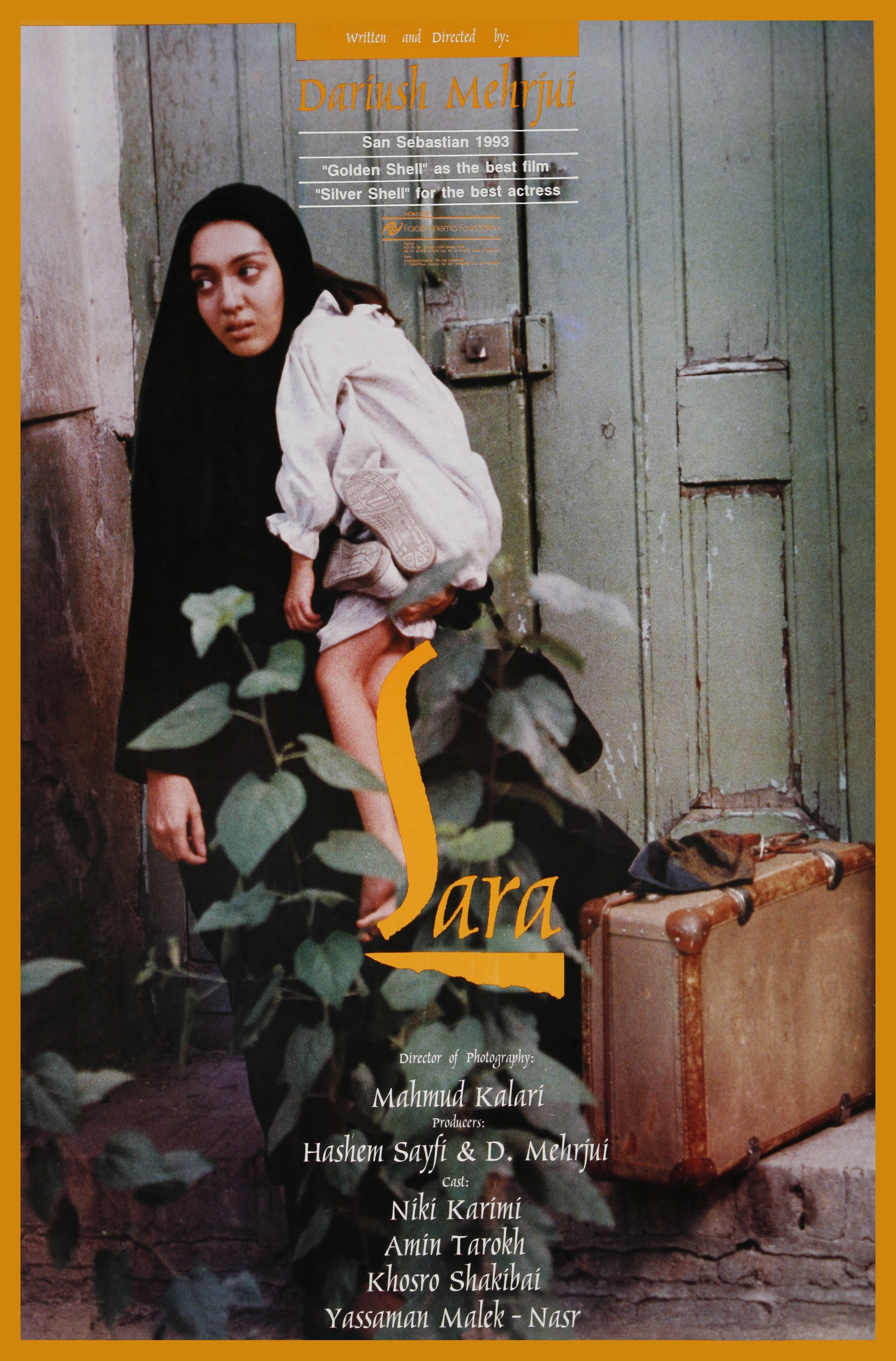
- Film poster
- Directed by: Dariush Mehrjui
- Written by: Dariush Mehrjui (based on A Doll's House (1879) play by Henrik Ibsen)
- Produced by: Dariush Mehrjui; Hashem Seifi
- Starring: Niki Karimi; Yassamin Maleknasr; Khosro Shakibai; Amin Tarokh
- Cinematography: Mahmoud Kalari
- Edited by: Hassan Hassandoost
- Release date: 1993
- Running time: 102 minutes
- Language: Persian

Sara (Persian: سارا, also Romanized as Sārā) is a 1993 motion picture directed by Dariush Mehrjui. The film is based on Henrik Ibsen's 1879 play A Doll's House, with Sara in the role of Nora Helmer, Hessam in the role of Torvald, Sima playing Ms Linde, and Goshtasb as Nils Krogstad.

The movie won the Audience Award at the Nantes Three Continents Festival, and tied for the Golden Seashell at the San Sebastián International Film Festival, where Niki Karimi won Best Actress award (Silver Seashell) for the title role and Yassamin Maleknasr Best Supporting Actress in Fajer Film Festival.
