= Coal (2019 film) =

- Directed by: Ismayil Munsif
- Written by: Ismayil Munsif
- Produced by: Etienne de Ricaud
- Release date: 2019
- Running time: 86 minutes
- Countries: France; Iran
- Language: Azerbaijani language

Coal (Azerbaijani: Kömür) – a film by Azerbaijani scenarist and film director Ismayil Munsif and by French producer Etienne de Ricaud. The use of Azerbaijani Turkic in the movie caused some obstacles. The film was not awarded at the Fajr International Film Festival. The director said that, this was due to the fact that the film was shot in Azerbaijani Turkic. Later, the promotion of the film was banned in the city of Ardabil under the pretext of promoting pan-Turkism. However, there was nothing promoting Turkism in the script of the film. A day after the banning ordered by the Irshad and Culture Department of Ardabil, the Turkic-language film "Coal" was allowed to be screened in Ardabil in the face of protests.

== About ==
Coal, a joint production with France, was shot in Azerbaijani Turkic. The scriptwriter and director of the movie shot in Astara is Ismayil Munsif and the producer is Etienne de Rica. The premiere of the film took place on October 9 at the Setare-Baran cinema in Tabriz. However, while the film attracted attention in Iran's "Fajr" International Film Festival, it did not win any awards. The director of the film, Ismayil Munsif, explained in his Instagram account the reason why the film was not awarded any prize:

I have no doubt that if the film had been produced in Persian and with a well-known producer, its fate could be completely different today. But I must say that, I will always make a film in Turkic. In the language of the nation that his share in Iranian cinema consists only of a series of ridiculous elements, which every viewer laughs at and these insults had never been censored by the Guidance Department. This means insulting different ethnic groups.

Although the film was screened in Tehran and Tabriz, it was banned from being shown in Ardabil. The screening of the film was banned under the pretext of promoting pan-Turkism. However, there was nothing promoting Turkism in the script of the film. The film is expected to be shown in France as well.

== Plot ==
A character named Geyrat is engaged in coal production in one of the border villages of Azerbaijan. His son Yashar, who is in prison for stealing gold, is allowed furlough for his sister's wedding. However, with the sudden disappearance of Yashar, Geyrat faces a new problem.

== See also ==
- Atabai
- 3 Faces
- The Song of Sparrows
