= Anoushirvan Arjmand =

Iranian actor

- انوشیروان ارجمند
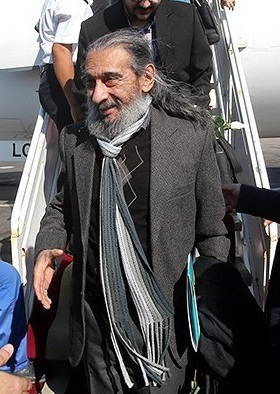
- Born: Anoushirvan Arjmand; October 19, 1941; Zahedan, Iran
- Died: December 14, 2014 (aged 73); Tehran, Iran
- Occupation: Actor
- Years active: 1960–2014
- Notable work: Duel (2004), Tardid (2009), and He Who Said No (2014)
- Spouse: Bano Amin
- Children: 2
- Relatives: Dariush Arjmand (brother)

Anoushirvan Arjmand (Persian: انوشیروان ارجمند; 19 October 1941 – 14 December 2014) was an Iranian actor, best known for his roles in films such as Duel (2004), Tardid (2009), and He Who Said No (2014). He also appeared in the television series Mokhtarnameh, The Gun Loaded and Shaheed-e-Kufa. He was born in Zahedan, Sistan and Baluchestan Province although his family were originally from Mashhad.

Anoushirvan Arjomand was hospitalized in Tehran's Parsian Hospital for a while due to heart disease, Arjmand died from a heart attack on 14 December 2014 in Tehran, aged 73. He was buried on 16 December at Behesht-e Zahra.
