= Mahchehreh Khalili =

Iranian actress (1977–2020)

- ماه‌چهره خلیلی
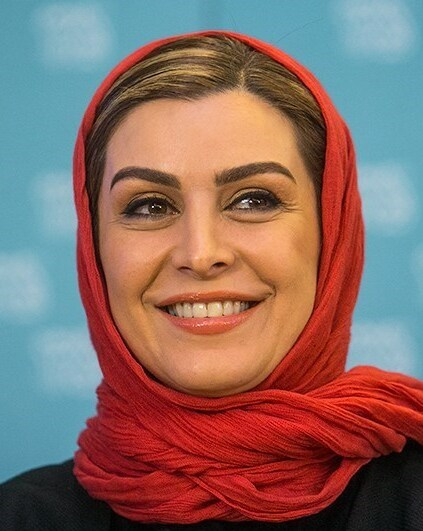
- Khalili in 2017
- Born: Mahchehreh Khalilizadeh; January 15, 1977; Tehran, Iran
- Died: 7 August 2020 (aged 43); London, England
- Education: University of Oxford
- Occupation: Actress
- Years active: 2002–2020
- Spouse: Ebrahim Ashrafi (m. 2014)
- Children: 1
- Relatives: Parvin Soleimani (grandmother)

Mahchehreh Khalilizadeh (Persian: ماه‌چهره خلیلی‌زاده, 15 January 1977 – 7 August 2020), known professionally as Mahchehreh Khalili (Persian: ماه‌چهره خلیلی), was an Iranian actress. She was the daughter of Colonel Manouchehr Khalili, a fighter pilot and leader of the Imperial Iranian Air Force's Golden Crown aerobatic team, and the granddaughter of Parvin Soleimani.

Khalili held a master's degree in architecture from the University of Oxford, England, and completed an acting course at the Method School in London. She began her television acting career with the series Mokhtarnameh (2010), directed by Davood Mir-Bagheri, and her cinematic debut with Black Eyes (2002), directed by Iraj Ghaderi. Khalili died in August 2020 due to pancreatic cancer in London.

== Career ==
In 2009, while filming a short film titled Paboos, Khalili sustained an injury. During a scene that required her to climb a hill, she experienced severe pain in the back of her leg, which prevented her from continuing. After being taken to the hospital, it was determined that the muscle tissue in her leg had torn, resulting in internal bleeding. Doctors advised her to refrain from any physical activity for 40 days and to keep her leg immobilized to prevent further bleeding. Consequently, her leg was placed in a cast.

== Death ==
Mahchehreh Khalili died on 7 August 2020 at the age of 43 in London due to pancreatic cancer. Her body was laid to rest on 11 August 2020 in the Muslim cemetery in Hendon, northwest London, in the presence of family and friends.

== Filmography ==
=== Films ===
- Angel’s Fingertips (2019)
- Ashnogl (2016)
- My Image Is Not in the Mirror (2016)
- Our Date in City Park (2016)
- I Forget You in My Memory (2016)
- Dawn Prayer (2015)
- Whistle of the Heart (2014)
- Angel’s Fingertips (2014)
- White Dandelion Heart (2014)
- The Gift (2014)
- Laleh (2013)
- Pain and Ecstasy (2013)
- Pomegranate Season (2013)
- Pomegranate (2013)
- By the Sea
- Greetings to the Angels (2012)
- The Network (2010)
- Bird Keeper (2010)
- Sweet Passion (2009)
- Shadow of Fear (2008)
- The Mouse (2008)
- Havana File (2005)
- Trap (2005)
- The Mask (2004)
- Black Eyes (2002)

=== Television series ===
- Marzieh (2019)
- The Lost Girl (2018)
- Through the Toils (2014)
- Pahlavi Hat (2004–2010)
- Ladder to the Sky (2009)
- In the Eye of the Wind (2003–2008)
- Mokhtarnameh (2004–2009)

=== Television film ===
- From Among the Shadows (2013)

=== Short film ===
- Paboos (2010)

=== Theater ===
- Deputat
- Nabat Branch

== Awards and honors ==
- Jackie Brown Award from the Tarantino Film Festival
- Trophy from the First Children and Youth Filmmaking Festival
- Trophy from the Fourth Film and Photography Week (July 2002)
- Best Actress Award from the Fourth Canada Film Festival in 2013
- Certificate of Appreciation from the 26th Isfahan International Children and Youth Film Festival (October 2012)
- First Tourism Film and Photography Festival Award for Best Film, Eid-e-Ghorban
- Letter of Appreciation from the Islamic Republic of Iran Broadcasting for acting in Mokhtarnameh
