= Khosrow Shakibai =

Iranian actor (1944–2008)

- خسرو شکیبایی
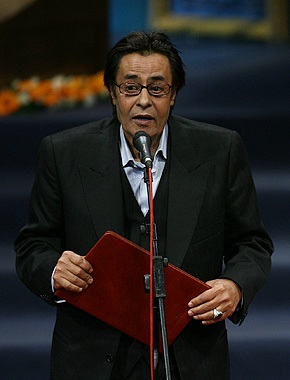
- Shakibai at the 2007 Fajr Film Festival
- Born: 27 March 1944; Tehran, Imperial State of Iran
- Died: 18 July 2008 (aged 64); Tehran, Iran
- Occupation: Actor
- Years active: 1980–2008
- Spouse: Parvin Kooshiar (m. 1988)
- Children: 2

Khosrow Shakibai (Persian: خسرو شکیبایی; 27 March 1944 – 18 July 2008) was an Iranian actor. He has received various accolades, including three Crystal Simorgh, a Hafez Award, two Iran Cinema Celebration Awards and an Iran's Film Critics and Writers Association Award.

== Career ==
He ranks amongst the most accomplished actors of his generation. Khosrow Shakibai was born to Colonel Ahmad Shakibāi and Ms Farideh Khātami. His father, who was an army Colonel, died from cancer when Khosrow (called Mahmoud by family and close friends) was only fourteen. Khosrow studied acting at Faculty of Fine Arts of University of Tehran. He began his stage career in 1963 and branched out his activities into film dubbing in 1968. Shakibā'í initiated his film acting in 1982 with Khatt-e Ghermez (The Red Line), directed by Masoud Kimiai. He had played in seven feature films when the film director Dariush Mehrjui offered him the title role of Hamoun, a film that over time has achieved a cult status.

Shakibai's performance in Hamoun marked a turning point in his career. He received a Crystal Simorgh at Fajr International Film Festival for his portrayal of Hamoun, a literary intellectual who gradually loses his touch with reality and becomes entrapped into an obsessive and destructive conflict with his estranged wife whom he deeply loves. Shakibai played also in some major television series. He won a Crystal Phoenix for Kimiā (The Philosopher's Stone) (1994) directed by Ahmad Reza Darvish.

Shakibai found also a considerable following for his voice, brought about through publication of the recordings of his readings of poems by contributors to modern Persian poetry including Forough Farrokhzad and Sohrab Sepehri. Shakibai is credited for helping to raise the stature of performing arts in Iran by the end of the 1980s, when the authorities in charge tended to neglect this area of cultural activities. He married twice. From his first marriage with the actress Tānyā Joharí he has one daughter named Poupak, and from his second marriage with Parvin Koush'yār one son named Pouria.

== Death ==
Khosrow Shakibai died at 6 am on 18 July 2008, of liver cancer in Pārsiān Hospital in Tehran. Earlier it had been reported that Shakibai's death had been a consequence of his heart failure. It has further been reported that on 5 October 2007, Khosrow Shakibai had been admitted to a hospital for suffering from diabetes, however on his explicit request the press had withheld this information from public. On Sunday 20 July 2008, the body of Khosrow Shakibai was laid to rest in The Artists Section of Behesht-e Zahra Cemetery in Tehran. His funeral procession began at 9 am from Vahdat Hall (Tālār-e Vahdat), Hafez Street, in Tehran and Shahab Moradi was the speaker of his memorial ceremony.

== Filmography ==
=== Film ===
Year	Title	Role	Director	Notes
1982	The Red Line	Jamal	Masoud Kimiai	
1983	Dadshah	Shanbeh	Habib Kavosh	
1985	Thunderbolt	Hassan	Ziaeddin Dorri	
1986	Relationship	Teacher	Pouran Derakhshandeh	
1987	The Thief and the Writer	Rahman	Kazem Masoumi	
1987	The Hunt	Mostafa	Majid Javanmard	
1988	The Train	Rasool	Amir Ghavidel	
1990	Passing Through the Dust	Rashid Bakhti	Pouran Derakhshandeh	
1990	Hamoun	Hamid Hamoun	Dariush Mehrjui	Won – Crystal Simorgh Fajr Film Festival Award for Best Actor
1991	Searching in the Island	Asaad Ahmadi Motlagh	Mehdi Sabaghzadeh	
1991	Lucifer	Saeed	Ahmad Reza Darvish	Nominated – Iran Cinema Celebration Award for Best Actor
1992	The Lady	Mahmoud	Dariush Mehrjui	
1993	Sara	Goshtasb	Dariush Mehrjui	Nominated – Iran Cinema Celebration Award for Best Supporting Actor
1993	Once for Ever	Mahmoud Nabaati	Sirus Alvand	Nominated – Crystal Simorgh Fajr Film Festival Award for Best Actor
1993	Remember the Flight	Bahraam Sherafat	Hamid Derakhshani	
1994	Bluff	Rasool	Samuel Khachikian	
1995	Pari	(2 roles) Safaa / Asad	Dariush Mehrjui	
1995	Kimia	Reza Rezaee Manesh	Ahmad Reza Darvish	Won – Crystal Simorgh Fajr Film Festival Award for Best Actor
1995	The Common Plight	Doctor	Yasamin Maleknasr	
1995	Romantic	Nader	Alireza Davoudnejad	
1996	Land of the Sun	Doctor Kasra	Ahmad Reza Darvish	
1996	Strange Sisters	Mansour Khosravi	Kiumars Pourahmad	
1997	Shadow by Shadow	Amir Heidari	Ali Zhekan	Nominated – Crystal Simorgh Fajr Film Festival Award for Best Actor
1997	Psycho	Noori / Mosafer	Dariush Farhang	
1998	Legion	Saber Sharmin	Ziaeddin Dorri	
2000	The Glass Love	(short role)	Reza Heidarnezhad	
2000	Life	Nosrat	Asghar Hashemi	
2000	A Girl Named Tondar	(2 roles) Rahim Khaan / Majnoon	Hamid Reza Ashtianipour	
2000	The Mix	Khosro	Dariush Mehrjui	
2000	Tales of an Island (3rd episode: The Lost Cousin)	Khosro	Dariush Mehrjui	
2002	Unruled Paper	Jahangir	Nasser Taghvai	Nominated – Crystal Simorgh Fajr Film Festival Award for Best Actor
2005	The Command	Hade Misagh	Masoud Kimiai	
2005	Season Salad	Adel Mashreghi	Fereydoun Jeyrani	Won – Crystal Simorgh Fajr Film Festival Award for Best Supporting Actor
2007	The Night Bus	Rahim	Kiumars Pourahmad	Won – Diploma Honorary Fajr Film Festival Award for Best Actor
2007	The Boss	Doctor	Masoud Kimiai	
2008	The Night	Reza	Rasul Sadr Ameli	
2008	Heartbroken	Mr. Khojasteh	Ali Rouintan	
2008	Eastern	Khosro	Abdollah Monjezi	
2009	Astonished	Mahi's Grandpa	Shalizeh Arefpour	

=== Television ===
- Roozi Roozegari (Once Upon A Time), directed by Amrollah Ahmadjoo, 1989 (1368 AH) ▪ Role: Moraad Beig
- Modarres (The Teacher), ???, ??? ▪ Role: Modarres
- Khaneh-ye Sabz (The Green House), directed by Bijan Birang and Masoud Resām, 1996 (1375 AH) ▪ Role: Reza Sabaahi
- Kaktus (Cactus), directed by Mohammd-Reza Honarmand, 1998 (1377 AH)
- Tofange Sar-por (The Gun Loaded), directed by Amrollah Ahmadjoo, 2002/2003 (1381/1382 AH) ▪ Role: Agha-seyed
- Dar Kenar-e Ham (Being Together), directed by Fat'h-Ali Oveisi, 2002 (1381 AH) ▪ Role: Mr. Rokn Abadi
- Sarzamin-e Sabz (The Green land), directed by Bijan Birang and Masoud Resām, 1997 (1376 AH) ▪ Role: Reza Sabaahi
- Miras (Inheritance), directed by Mohammad-Hossein Zeyn'ali, 2007 (1386 AH) ▪ Role: Reza
- Sheikh Bahai (see Sheykh Bahaee, aka Baha' al-Din al-'Amili), directed by Shahrām Asadi, 2008 (1387 AH) ▪ Role: Sheykh Bahaee's father

== Discography ==
=== Spoken word albums ===
- Nāmeh-hā (The Letters), poems by Sayyed-Ali Sālehi
- Sedaye paye ab ( The sound of the water's foodsteps ), poems by Sohrab Sepehri
- Neshāni-hā (The Addresses), poems by Sayyed-Ali Sālehi
- Mehrabāni (Kindness), poems by Mohammad Reza Abdolmalekian
- Hajm-e Sabz (The Green Volume), poems by Sohrab Sepehri
- Pari Khāni (Reading the Angels), poems by Forough Farrokhzad
- Albom-e Sohrāb (Shohrab's Album), poems by Sohrab Sepehri

== Awards and nominations ==
=== Awards ===
- Crystal Simorgh at the 8th Fajr International Film Festival, 1989 (1368 AH), for his main role in Hamoun
- Crystal Simorgh at the 13th Fajr International Film Festival, 1993 (1373 AH), for his main role in Kimiā (The Philosopher's Stone)
- Golden Tablet by the Iran Actor Site, 2003 (1382 AH), the 3rd Series, for Kāghaz-e bi Khatt (Unruled Paper)
- Crystal Simorgh at the 23rd Fajr International Film Festival, 2004 (1383 AH), for his supporting role in Sālād-e Fasl (The Garden Salad)
- Certificate of Honour at the 25th Fajr International Film Festival, 2006 (1385 AH), for his main role in Otobus-e Shab (The Night Bus)
- Second best Actor in the category of men, for Kāghaz-e bi Khatt (Unruled Paper), during the 17th sequence, 2002 (1381 AH), by Writers and Critics

=== Nominations ===
- Crystal Simorgh at the 11th Fajr International Film Festival, 1992 (1371 AH), for his main role in Yek'bār Barāy-e Hamisheh (Once and for Ever)
- Crystal Simorgh at the 15th Fajr International Film Festival, 1996 (1375 AH), for his main role in Sāyeh be Sāyeh (In Close Pursuit)
- Crystal Simorgh at the 20th Fajr International Film Festival, 2001 (1380 AH), for his main role in Kāghaz-e bi Khatt (Unruled Paper)
- Golden Tablet by the Iran Actor Site, 2005 (1384 AH), the 6th Series, for Sālād-e Fasl (The Garden Salad)
- Golden Tablet by the Iran Actor Site, 2005 (1384 AH), the 6th Series, for Hokm (The Verdict)
- Golden Image (Tandis-e Zarrin), 2006 (1385 AH), for the best main role in the category of men in the feature film Che Kasi Amir rā Kosht? (Who Killed Amir?)
