= Niki Karimi =

Iranian actress and filmmaker

- نیکی کریمی
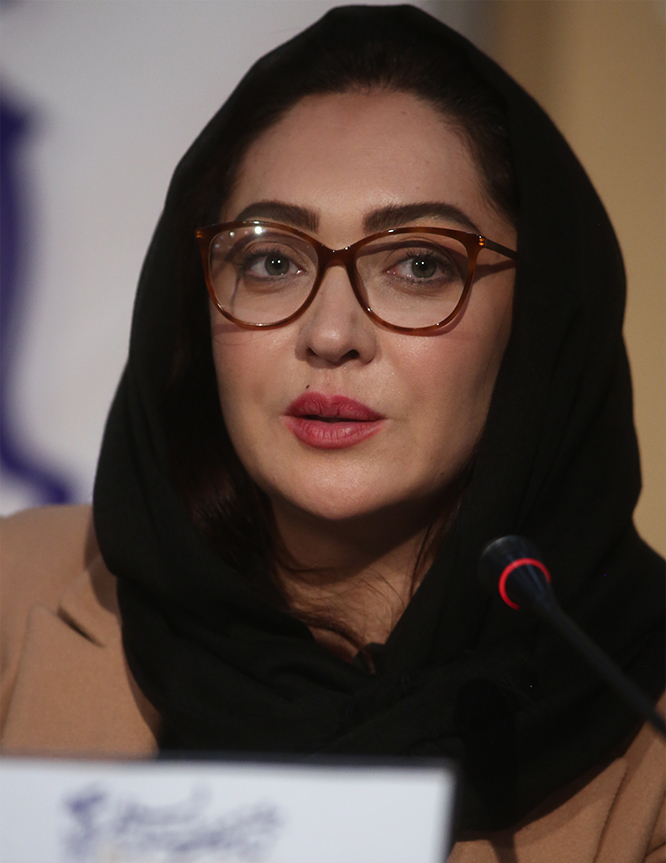
- Karimi at the 2020 Fajr Film Festival
- Born: 10 November 1971 (age 54); Tehran, Iran
- Occupations: Actress; director; screenwriter; producer
- Years active: 1989–present
- Height: 154 cm (5 ft 1 in)
- Partner: Abbas Kiarostami (1995–2007)

Niki Karimi (Persian: نیکی کریمی; born 10 November 1971) is an Iranian actress and filmmaker. Regarded as "the most prominent figure among the young generations coming after post-Islamic Revolution Iranian Cinema", she has received various accolades, including a Crystal Simorgh, three Hafez Awards, an Iran Cinema Celebration Award, and three Iran's Film Critics and Writers Association Awards.

Born in Tehran, Iran, Karimi began her career in the late 1980s. She received critical acclaim for her performance in Sara (1992), for which she won the best actress award at the San Sebastian Film Festival.

== Early life ==
Niki Karimi was born on November 10, 1971, in Tehran, Iran. Her parents are both Persians from Tafresh. She has been active in theater since elementary school, and said that her early interest in film and literature inspired her to become an actress.

== Career ==
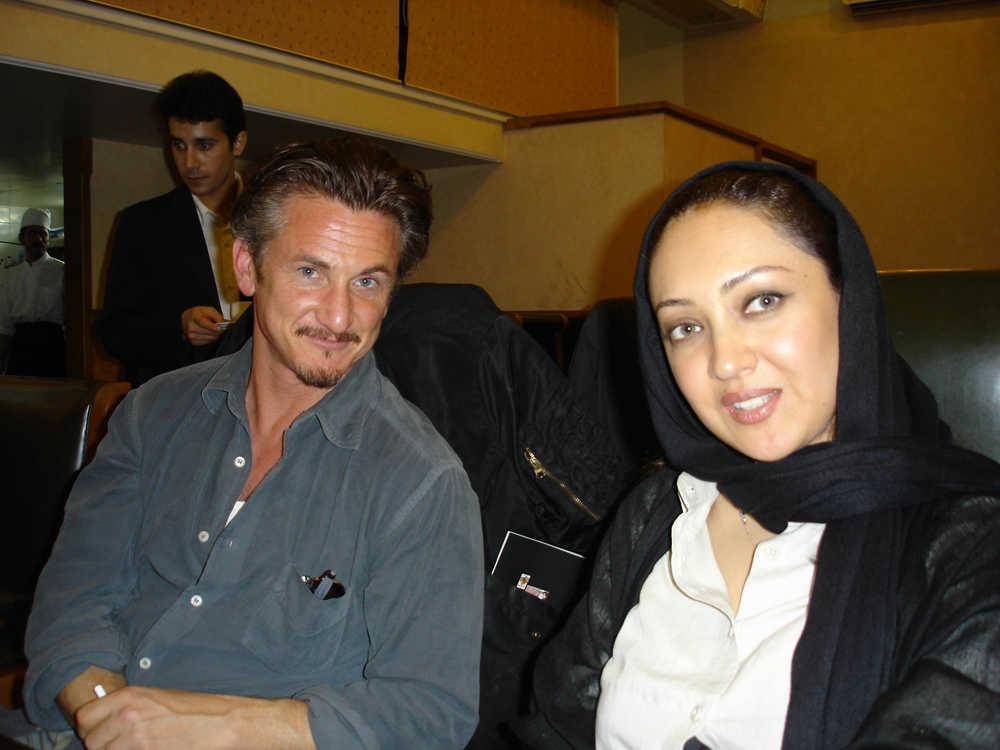
Niki Karimi and Sean Penn

In 1990, she was cast as a young bride in Behrooz Afkhami's hit film The Bride.

Karimi began her career in the late 1980s. She received critical acclaim for her performance in Sara (1992), for which she won the best actress award at the San Sebastian Film Festival.

Karimi has won many awards nationally and internationally for "Sara" such as San Sebastian film festival award for best actress. She has also been on the jury for more than 20 renowned film festivals, including Karlovy Vary Film Festival, the Edinburgh International Film Festival, the Locarno International Film Festival and Thessaloniki International Film Festival and Berlin Film Festival and also the 60th Cannes Film Festival. She was the assistant of Abbas Kiarostami from 1992 to 2007.

Expanding on her career as an actor, she wrote and directed the documentary To Have or Not to Have (2001).

In 2001, she won her first award as a director in Iran's Rain film festival for her work To Have or Not to Have, which was produced by renowned Iranian filmmaker Abbas Kiarostami.

Nominated at the 2005 Cannes Film Festival for her feature film directorial debut One Night (2005), she said that acting no longer satisfied her and she would like to direct more movies.

In addition to films, Karimi has also done translating work. In 1999 she released her first translation, Marlon Brando's biography Songs My Mother Taught Me, which she translated from English to Persian. She also translated two books by Hanif Kureishi, a Pakistani-English writer.

Her third film as director, Final whistle (2011), won three awards at the Vesoul International Film Festival of Asian Cinema in Vesoul, France.

She was nominated for the best actress award in Fajr Film Festival in 2011 for I Am His Wife (2011), directed by Mostafa Shayesteh.

She was awarded by the jury of the Iranian Fajr Film ّFestival for her last film as best director, actress and producer. She also got a jury award for acting in two films, Wednesday, May 9 and Death of Fish.

=== As a translator ===
Year	Title
2005	Intimacy by Hanif Kureishi
1999	Songs My Mother Taught Me by Marlon Brando, Robert Lindsey

=== As a film critic ===
Year	Title
2022	Member of Jury at Tribeca Film Festival
2021	Head of Jury at Crime and Punishment film festival, Turkey
2020	Member of Jury at Antalya Golden Orange Film Festival, Istanbul
2016	Member of Jury at 35th Istanbul Film Festival, Istanbul
2016	Member of Jury at 34th Fajr International Film Festival, Tehran
2015	Member of Jury at 60th Valladolid International Film Festival, spain
2015	Head of Jury at 19th Tallinn Black Nights Film Festival, Tallinn
2015	Member of Jury at 10th Batumi International Art-house Film Festival, Batumi
2015	Member of Jury at 33rd Fajr International Film Festival, Tehran
2014	Member of Jury at 20th Kolkata International Film Festival, India
2014	Head of Jury at 68th Edinburgh International Film Festival, Edinburgh
2014	Member of Jury at 4th International Parvin E'tesami Film Festival, Tehran
2014	Member of Jury at 12th Pune International Film Festival, India
2013	Member of Jury at 27th Isfahan International Children Film Festival, Isfahan
2012	Member of Jury at Abu Dhabi Film Festival
2011	Member of Jury at International Antalya Golden Orange Film Festival
2009	Member of Jury at Karlovy Vary International Film Festival
2008	Member of Jury at Dubai International Film Festival
2007	Member of Jury at Berlin Film Festival
2007	Member of Jury at Cannes Film Festival
2007	Member of Jury at Durban International Film Festival
2006	Head of Jury at Reykjavik International Film Festival
2005	Member of Jury at Locarno International Film Festival
2005	Member of Jury at Thessaloniki Film Festival

== Filmography ==
=== Film ===
Year	Title	Role	Director	Notes	Ref(s)
1990	Temptation	Gohar	Jamshid Heydari		
1991	The Bride	Mahin Nazeri	Behrouz Afkhami		
1993	The Wolf's Trail	Negin	Masoud Kimiai		
1993	Sara	Sara	Dariush Mehrjui		
1995	The Scent of Joseph's Shirt	Shirin	Ebrahim Hatamikia		
1995	Pari	Pari	Dariush Mehrjui		
1997	Wind and Poppy		Ziaeddin Dori		
1997	Minoo Watch Tower	Minoo	Ebrahim Hatamikia		
1997	Shadow by Shadow	Gila	Ali Zhekan		
1997	Psycho	Maryam	Dariush Farhang		
1998	Jahan Pahlavan Takhti	Director's wife	Ali Hatami, Behrouz Afkhami		
1999	Eve's Red Apple	Neda	Saeed Asadi		
1999	Two Women	Fereshteh	Tahmineh Milani		
1999	Girls in Expectancy	Roshanak	Rahman Rezaei		
1999	The Afflicted Generation		Rasoul Mollagholipour		
2000	The Mix		Dariush Mehrjui		
2000	Actor	Roya	Mohammad Ali Sadjadi		
2001	ABC Africa		Abbas Kiarostami	as assistant director	
2001	A Thousand Women Like Me	Shahrzad	Ali Karimi		
2001	The Hidden Half	Fereshteh	Tahmineh Milani		
2001	To Have or Not to Have		Niki Karimi	also screenwriter	
2003	The Fifth Reaction	Fereshteh	Tahmineh Milani		
2003	One Flew Over the Cuckoo's Nest	Yalda	Ahmad Reza Motamedi		
2004	The Ransomer	Rana	Farzad Motamen		
2005	One Night		Niki Karimi	also screenwriter	
2005	Top of the Tower	Leila	Kiumars Pourahmad		
2005	Gone with the Wind	Tahmineh	Sadra Abdollahi		
2006	Wedding Dinner	Mitra	Ebrahim Vahidzadeh		
2006	Havana File	Zoya Fani	Alireza Raeesian		
2006	A Few Days Later	Shahrzad	Niki Karimi	also screenwriter	
2006	Who Killed Amir?	Ziba Zibadoost	Mehdi Karampour		
2006	Stars 2: She's a Star	Farzaneh Mashreghi	Fereydoun Jeyrani		
2007	The Other Wife	Mahtab	Sirus Alvand		
2007	The Music Box	Ali's mother	Farzad Motamen		
2008	Three Women	Minoo	Manijeh Hekmat		
2008	Women Are Angels	Nazanin	Shahram Shah Hosseini		
2008	Mr. Seven Colors	Firoozeh	Shahram Shah Hosseini		
2008	Shirin	Woman in Audience	Abbas Kiarostami		
2009	Hot Chocolate	Banoo	Hamed Kolahdari		
2009	24th Street	Nazanin	Saeed Asadi		
2009	Trial on the Street	Nasim	Masoud Kimiai		
2009	The Day Goes and the Night Comes	Marjan	Omid Bonakdar, Keyvan Alimohammadi		
2010	Hey to Love	Mitra	Asghar Naeemi		
2010	Democracy in Daylight	Ms. Ehsani	Ali Atshani		
2010	Two Sisters	Mahtab	Mohammad Banki		
2011	The Playfellow	Naghmeh	Gholam Reza Ramezani		
2011	Wakefulness	Yasaman	Farzad Motamen		
2011	Final Whistle	Sahar	Niki Karimi	also screenwriter, producer	
2011	Crime	Atefeh	Masoud Kimiai		
2011	Along the City	Fariba	Ali Atshani		
2011	The Princess of the Moon		Elham Gharehkhani, Mehrtash Mahdavi		
2011	Calm Streets	The Reporter	Kamal Tabrizi		
2012	The Presiden's Cell Phone	Mrs. Tayebi	Ali Atshani		
2012	I'm His Wife	Shahla	Mostafa Shayesteh		
2013	Annunciation to a Third Millennium Citizen	Mrs. Safaii	Mohammad Hadi Karimi		
2014	Raspberry	Homa	Saman Salur		
2014	Life Is Elsewhere	Shahrzad	Manouchehr Hadi		
2015	Wednesday, May 9	Leila	Vahid Jalilvand		
2015	Night Shift	Roya	Niki Karimi	also screenwriter, producer	
2015	Death of the Fish	Tahmineh	Rouhollah Hejazi		
2016	Stolen	Mina	Bijan Mirbagheri		
2017	Human Comedy		Mohammad Hadi Karimi		
2017	Azar	Azar	Mohammad Hamzei	also producer	
2017	Maybe It Wasn’t Love		Saeed Ebrahimifar		
2018	The Truck		Kambuzia Partovi		
2018	Astigmatism	Mrs. Namiri	Majid Reza Mostafavi		
2020	Atabai		Niki Karimi	also screenwriter, producer	
2022	Squad of Girls	Yeganeh Kamayi	Monir Gheidi		
2022	Until Tomorrow		Ali Asgari	as producer	
2022	Laleh		Asadollah Niknejad		
TBA	A Time in Eternity		Mehdi Norouzian	as producer	

=== Web ===
Year	Title	Role	Director	Platform	Ref(s)
2018	Forbidden	Parvaneh Asadzadeh	Amir Pourkian	Video CD	
2020–2021	Blue Blood	Tina Fazlirad	Behrang Tofighi	Filimo, Namava	
2022	Rebel	Shima	Mohammad Kart	Filimo	
2023–2024	Seven		Kiarash Asadizadeh	Tamashakhaneh	

=== Television ===
Year	Title	Role	Director	Network	Notes	Ref(s)
1995	Life		Mohammad Reza A'alami	IRIB TV1	TV series	
2015–2016	Kimia	Mahboubeh Maleki	Javad Afshar	IRIB TV2	TV series	
2023–2024	Homeland	Shaparak Bahadori	Kamal Tabrizi	IRIB TV3	TV series	

== Awards and nominations ==
Award	Year	Category	Nominated Work	Result	Ref.
Bratislava International Film Festival	2015	Best Actress	Wednesday, May 9	Won	
Cairo International Film Festival	2001	Best Actress	The Hidden Half	Won	
Cambridge Film Festival	2021	Best Fiction Feature	Atabai	Nominated	
Cannes Film Festival	2005	Un Certain Regard	One Night	Nominated	
Cannes Film Festival	2005	Caméra d'Or	One Night	Nominated	
Dhaka International Film Festival	2022	Best Feature Film – Women Film Maker's Section	Atabai	Nominated	
Dubai International Film Festival	2011	Best Feature Film	Final Whistle	Nominated	
Fajr Film Festival	1991	Best Actress in a Leading Role	The Bride	Nominated	
Fajr Film Festival	1993	Best Actress in a Leading Role	Sara	Nominated	
Fajr Film Festival	1995	Best Actress in a Leading Role	Pari	Nominated	
Fajr Film Festival	1998	Best Actress in a Leading Role	Psycho	Nominated	
Fajr Film Festival	1999	Best Actress in a Leading Role	Two Women	Honorary Diploma	
Fajr Film Festival	2003	Best Actress in a Leading Role	One Flew Over the Cuckoo's Nest and The Fifth Reaction	Won	
Fajr Film Festival	2015	Special Jury Prize	Night Shift	Honorary Diploma	
Fajr Film Festival	2020	Best Film	Atabai	Nominated	
Fajr Film Festival	2020	Best Director	Atabai	Nominated	
Fribourg International Film Festival	2007	Grand Prix	A Few Days Later	Nominated	
Hafez Awards	1998	Best Actress – Motion Picture	Psycho	Won	
Hafez Awards	1999	Best Actress – Motion Picture	Two Women	Won	
Hafez Awards	2001	Best Actress – Motion Picture	The Hidden Half	Won	
Hafez Awards	2003	Best Actress – Motion Picture	One Flew Over the Cuckoo's Nest	Nominated	
Hafez Awards	2016	Best Actress – Motion Picture	Wednesday, May 9	Nominated	
Hafez Awards	2023	Best Motion Picture	Atabai	Nominated	
Hafez Awards	2023	Best Director – Motion Picture	Atabai	Nominated	
Hafez Awards	2023	Best Screenplay – Motion Picture	Atabai	Nominated	
Hong Kong Asian Film Festival	2007	New Talent Award	A Few Days Later	Nominated	
Iran Cinema Celebration	1999	Best Actress in a Leading Role	Two Women	Won	
Iran Cinema Celebration	2000	Best Actress in a Leading Role	The Afflicted Generation	Nominated	
Iran Cinema Celebration	2001	Best Actress in a Leading Role	The Hidden Half	Nominated	
Iran Cinema Celebration	2003	Best Actress in a Leading Role	The Fifth Reaction	Nominated	
Iran Cinema Celebration	2007	Best Actress in a Leading Role	Stars 2: She's a Star	Nominated	
Iranian Cinema Directors' Great Celebration	2022	Best Film Director	Atabai	Nominated	
Iran's Film Critics and Writers Association	2015	Best Actree in a Leading Role	Wednesday, May 9	Nominated	
Iran's Film Critics and Writers Association	2022	Best Film	Atabai	Won	
Iran's Film Critics and Writers Association	2022	Best Director	Atabai	Won	
Iran's Film Critics and Writers Association	2022	Best Screenplay	Atabai	Won	
Nantes Three Continents Festival	1993	Best Actress	Sara	Won	
San Sebastián International Film Festival	1993	Best Actress	Sara	Won	
Sofia Menar Film Festival	2022	Best Film	Atabai	Nominated	
Taormina International Film Festival	1999	Best Actress	Two Women	Won	
Thessaloniki Film Festival	2005	Golden Alexander	One Night	Nominated	
Torino Film Festival	2005	Best Feature Film	One Night	Nominated	
Torino Film Festival	2005	Special Mention	One Night	Won	
Vesoul Asian Film Festival	2012	Emile Guimet Award	Final Whistle	Won	
Vesoul Asian Film Festival	2012	INALCO Jury Award	Final Whistle	Won	
Vesoul Asian Film Festival	2012	High Schools Award	Final Whistle	Won	
Vesoul Asian Film Festival	2012	Golden Wheel	Final Whistle	Nominated	

== See also ==
- Iranian women
- Iranian cinema
- List of famous Persian women
- Persian women's movement
- Fajr International Film Festival
