= Saman Arastoo =

Iranian actor and director (born 1967)

- سامان ارسطو
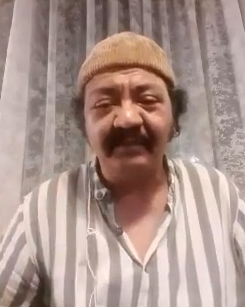
- Arastoo in 2021
- Born: 5 June 1967 (age 59); Shahrud, Iran
- Occupations: Actor, director

Saman Arastoo (Persian: سامان ارسطو; born 5 June 1967) is an Iranian actor and director. He starred in the 2003 drama Abadan prior to gender transition, and directs plays regarding the acceptance of transgender people in Iranian society.

== Career ==
Following wide publicity around his gender transition, Arastoo has been a public figure for the Iranian transgender community, including holding drama therapy workshops such as "Self Cognition". His play Khodkar-é-Bikar (Useless Pen) features transgender characters played by transgender actors.

Arastoo founded the Avaye Divanegan Theatre Group in 1983. The name translates to "Music of the Crazed."

Actor Jack Haven said they first started using their chosen name while participating in a workshop organized by Arastoo.

== Filmography ==
Year	Title	Role
2003	Abadan	Actor
2004	Friday's Soldiers	Actor
2008	Tigh-zan	Actor

== Personal life ==
Arastoo describes his first marriage in 1991 as a "forced marriage" for which the divorce lasted one and a half year. He underwent sex reassignment surgeries at age 42 in 2008. He married again in 2015.
