= Niku Kheradmand =

Iranian actress and dubber

Niku (Nikoo) Kheradmand نیکو خردمند
- Born: 10 November 1932; Tehran, Iran
- Died: 17 November 2009 (aged 77); Tehran, Iran
- Occupations: Actress and film dubber

Niku Kheradmand (Persian: نیکو خردمند, also Romanized as Nikoo Kheradmand; 10 November 1932 – 17 November 2009) was an Iranian actress and film dubber. She died in a Tehran hospital on 17 November 2009, aged 77. Kheradmand had suffered a heart attack several months earlier.

Filmmaker Mehdi Sabbaghzadeh had once regarded Niku Kheradmand as the mother of Iran's cinema. Her first work in film was The Last Act by Varuj Karim-Masihi. She appeared in The Plaything by Turaj Mansuri. Other works include Havana Dossier (Alireza Raiisian), Café Setāreh (Saman Moghaddam), and How Much Do You Want to Cry (Shahed Ahmadlu). She played a role on the TV series Thieves of the Grandmother.

== Awards ==
She won Best Supporting Actress Crystal Simorgh at the 9th edition of the Fajr Film Festival and another Best Supporting Actress Crystal Simorgh at the 12th edition of the festival for her role in The Plaything by Turaj Mansuri.

== Filmography ==
=== Films ===
- 2008 - Shirin
- 2008 - Khāk-e Āshenā (The Familiar Soil), directed by Bahman Farmanara
- 2008 - Takam-Chi
- 2007 - Chacun son cinéma ou Ce petit coup au coeur quand la lumière s'éteint et que le film commence
- 2006 - Café Setāreh, directed by Saman Moghaddam
- 2003 - Ezdevāj-e Ghiābi (Marriage in Absence)
- 2002 - Kāghaz-e bi Khatt (Unruled Paper)
- 2000 - Dokhtari be Nām-e Tondar (A Girl by the Name of Tondar)
- 1997 - Ravāni (Psycho)
- 1994 - Zinat (Ornament)
- 1993 - Khāneh-ye Khalvat (The Quiet Home)
- 1992 - Bāzicheh (The Plaything)

=== Television series ===
- Thieves of the Grandmother
