= Atabai =

- Film poster
- Directed by: Niki Karimi
- Written by: Niki Karimi; Hadi Hejazifar
- Produced by: Niki Karimi
- Starring: Hadi Hejazifar; Sahar Dolatshahi; Javad Ezzati
- Cinematography: Saman Lotfian
- Edited by: Hossein Jamshidi Gohari
- Music by: Hossein Alizadeh
- Release dates: 1 February 2020 (FIFF); 24 November 2021 (Iran)
- Country: Iran
- Languages: Azerbaijani; Persian

Atabai (Persian: آتابای) is a 2020 Iranian romantic drama film directed by Niki Karimi and written by Hadi Hejazifar and Karimi. The film screened for the first time at the 38th Fajr Film Festival and earned 5 nominations.

== Premise ==
The story is about Kazem a middle aged man who lives in a village. He has left the university because of a former love but when two sisters enter his life he falls in love once again.

== Cast ==
- Hadi Hejazifar as Kazem / Atabai
- Sahar Dolatshahi as Sima
- Javad Ezzati as Yahya
- Danial Noroush as Aydin
- Masoumeh Rabaninia as Jeyran
- Mahlagha Meynoosh Zad as Simin
- Yousefali Daryadel as Kazem's Father

== Reception ==
=== Accolades ===
Award	Year	Category	Recipient	Result
Cambridge International Film Festival	2021	Best Fiction Feature	Niki Karimi	Nominated
Dhaka International Film Festival	2022	Best Feature	Niki Karimi	Nominated
Fajr Film Festival	2020	Best Film	Niki Karimi	Nominated
Fajr Film Festival	2020	Best Director	Niki Karimi	Nominated
Fajr Film Festival	2020	Best Actor in a Supporting Role	Javad Ezzati	Nominated
Fajr Film Festival	2020	Best Cinematography	Saman Lotfian	Nominated
Fajr Film Festival	2020	Best Original Score	Hossein Alizadeh	Nominated
Fajr Film Festival	2022	Best Still Photography	Omid Saleh	Nominated
Iranian Cinema Directors' Great Celebration	2022	Best Film Director	Niki Karimi	Nominated
Iran's Film Critics and Writers Association	2022	Best Film	Niki Karimi	Won
Iran's Film Critics and Writers Association	2022	Best Director	Niki Karimi	Won
Iran's Film Critics and Writers Association	2022	Best Screenplay	Niki Karimi, Hadi Hejazifar	Won
Iran's Film Critics and Writers Association	2022	Best Actor in a Leading Role	Hadi Hejazifar	Nominated
Iran's Film Critics and Writers Association	2022	Best Actor in a Supporting Role	Javad Ezzati	Won
Iran's Film Critics and Writers Association	2022	Best Cinematography	Saman Lotfian	Nominated
Iran's Film Critics and Writers Association	2022	Best Sound	Kamran Kian'ersi, Alireza Alavian	Nominated
Iran's Film Critics and Writers Association	2022	Best Original Score	Hossein Alizadeh	Won
Pune International Film Festival	2022	Global Cinema	Niki Karimi	Nominated
Sofia Menar International Film Festival	2022	Best Film	Niki Karimi	Nominated

== See also ==
- Coal
- 3 Faces
- The Song of Sparrows
