= Fireworks Wednesday =

- Theatrical poster
- Persian: چهارشنبه‌سوری
- Directed by: Asghar Farhadi
- Written by: Asghar Farhadi; Mani Haghighi
- Produced by: Jamal Sadatian
- Starring: Hedieh Tehrani; Taraneh Alidoosti; Hamid Farokhnezhad; Pantea Bahram; Matin Heydarinia; Houman Seyyedi; Hassan Tasiri; Sahar Dolatshahi; Ebrahim Javadi; Forough Ghajabagli
- Cinematography: Hossein Jafarian
- Edited by: Hayedeh Safiyari
- Music by: Peyman Yazdanian
- Distributed by: Boshra Films
- Release date: January 20, 2006 (FIFF)
- Running time: 102 minutes
- Language: Persian

Fireworks Wednesday (Persian: چهارشنبه‌سوری, romanized: Čahâršanbe-Suri) is a 2006 Iranian drama film directed by Asghar Farhadi and co-written by Farhadi and Mani Haghighi. It stars Hedieh Tehrani, Taraneh Alidoosti, and Hamid Farokhnezhad. The film screened for the first time at the 24th Fajr Film Festival and received 9 nominations, 4 awards and a diploma honorary.

== Plot ==
The film portrays the life of a turbulent couple, Mozhdeh and Morteza Samiei, as they prepare for a vacation to Dubai the morning after Chaharshanbe Suri, a festival held on the eve of Wednesday before Nowruz. Morteza hires a new maid Rouhi, a bride-to-be, through an agency to help the couple clean their apartment, though Mozhdeh initially insists that she is not required.

While she is doing her work, Rouhi learns piece by piece what is happening between the two: Mozhdeh suspects that Morteza is seeing their divorced neighbor, Simin, behind her back, after discovering Simin's phone number in the logs. Simin, meanwhile, resides in an adjoining apartment that she uses as a beauty salon, which further arouses complaints for neighbors already suspicious of her divorced status. As Morteza says that he would not come home until 5 PM, Mozhdeh sets Rouhi, who wants her eyebrow trimmed, to ask Simin if she is also unavailable until 5 PM; her fears are confirmed.

Simin, though, has enough time to trim Rouhi's eyebrows; there, Rouhi overhears that Simin knows when the Samiei are due to depart to Dubai. As Rouhi is leaving, the landlord arrives to inform Simin that they are selling the apartment, though Rouhi is able to mitigate the confrontation by pretending to be Simin's niece instead of a customer. When Rouhi goes back to Samiei, she finds her chador taken by Mozhdeh, who wants to spy on Morteza, leaving Rouhi to take the Samiei's son, Amirali, home from school. Morteza is enraged upon learning these and publicly beats Mozhdeh. Fed up, Mozhdeh decides to move to her sister and brother-in-law's residence with Amirali, refusing to hear Morteza's apologies. To calm the situation down, Rouhi lies about the reason why Simin knows their departure time.

Morteza offers Rouhi a ride home in exchange for accompanying him and Amirali to see the fireworks. He leaves the two for a while and meets with Simin in private, confirming that the two are indeed having an affair; to his dismay, though, Simin wants them to separate, as she does not want to break up the Samiei. Simin is harassed on the street and tears up at now being totally alone. Rouhi then sniffs Simin's perfume (she has previously scented her hand with Simin's perfume) and sees Morteza with Simin's distinctive musical lighter, realizing the truth. Later, while waiting for a ride home, Rouhi encounters Simin's ex-husband dropping off their daughter with Simin. Rouhi goes to tell Mozhdeh but then decides against it. Mozhdeh continues cleaning the apartment and spying on Simin while Rouhi gets a ride home. When quizzed by Morteza on why they lied, all an uncomfortable Rouhi can say is that Simin had been nice that day. Rouhi's fiance is impressed by the eyebrow job. Morteza tries to convince Simin's ex-husband to come inside, but he insists on sleeping in the car. Morteza sleeps alone while Mozhdeh sleeps with Amirali.

== Cast ==
- Hedieh Tehrani as Mozhdeh Samiei
- Taraneh Alidoosti as Rouhi
- Hamid Farokhnezhad as Morteza Samiei
- Pantea Bahram as Simin
- Houman Seyyedi as Abdolreza
- Sahar Dolatshahi as Mozhdeh's sister

== Reception ==
=== Critical response ===
On review aggregator website Rotten Tomatoes, 100% of 45 reviews are positive for the film, with an average rating of 7.70/10. Metacritic assigned the film a weighted average score of 84 out of 100, based on 18 reviews, indicating "universal acclaim".

Upon the release at Fajr International Film Festival, the film gained critical acclaim in its home country where it won 4 Crystal Simorgh.

Deborah Young of Variety wrote in her review: "Few Iranian films have tried to realistically depict both the urban middle and lower classes, and fewer still with the complexity of story telling and depth of characterization in Asghar Farhadi's impressive third feature, Fireworks Wednesday... The quality of the production is evident in Hossein Jafarian's fluid cinematography and Hayedeh Safyari's nervous editing. The final scenes are a tour de force in which the bonfire-strewn streets fill with merrymakers and the exploding fireworks look as dangerous as a war, an apt metaphor for the everyday violence in the characters' lives."

Sheila O'Malley of Slant Magazine praised the movie as well as Hedyeh Tehrani's performance: " Hedyeh Tehrani, a delectable actress, plays Mozhde, the depressed wife. This is a marvelous performance, layered, painful, heartfelt. It's a difficult part... Tehrani has one of those malleable expressive faces so beloved by cameras everywhere. She thinks something, and it shows. She feels something, and we get it. The scenes of the fights with her husband are electric, exhilarating to watch. They feel like real arguments and have a jagged chaos to them that is truly frightening."

In another review Jeffrey M. Anderson of Combustible Celluloid gave the film 3 & 1/2 Stars (out of 4) and praised originality of Iranian cinema: "One of the things I love about Iranian cinema is that it seems to inspire itself. Even a decade after the first Iranian "New Wave" films began appearing in the United States in 1997, Iranian filmmakers have refused to "go Western" and use Hollywood methods in their films. Rather, Iranian filmmakers have continued to work with the original ideas and methods that made their cinema exciting in the first place... Director Asghar Farhadi takes his time, allowing information to creep in at its own pace rather than trying to force it all upon us in the first ten minutes. But the most vivid element is his well-rounded characters: men and women truly relating to one another in both positive and negative lights."

Geoff Andrew of Time Out wrote: "What distinguishes the film is the way Farhadi keeps us guessing from as to what exactly is happening and why; repeatedly shifting our point of view, he forces us to question our assumptions about characters and their reliability. This compelling, corrosive account of male-female relationships in today’s Tehran is tempered by genuine compassion for the individuals concerned; wisely, Farhadi never serves judgement on them in their troubled pursuit of truth, love and happiness. Intelligent, illuminating and directed with unflashy expertise."

=== Accolades ===
- Gold Hugo at Chicago International Film Festival (2006)
- Golden Lady Harimaguada at Las Palmas de Gran Canaria International Film Festival (2007)
- Crystal Simorgh for Best actress (Hedieh Tehrani), Best Director (Asghar Farhadi) and Best Editing (Hayedeh Safiyari) in 2006 Fajr International Film Festival
