= Hedieh Tehrani =

Iranian actress (born 1972)

- هديه تهرانی
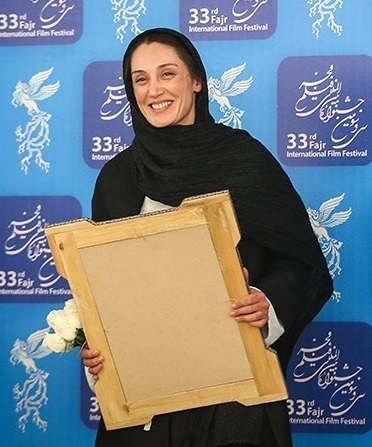
- Tehrani in 2015
- Born: June 25, 1972 (age 53); Tehran, Iran
- Occupations: Actress; photographer
- Years active: 1996–present

Hedieh Tehrani (Persian: هديه تهرانی; born June 25, 1972) is an Iranian actress. She is most noted for her willingness to play mysterious, stony-faced and cold-hearted women. She has received various accolades, including two Crystal Simorghs, four Hafez Awards, an Iran Cinema Celebration Award and an Iran's Film Critics and Writers Association Award.

== Career ==
Mohammad Reza Sharifinia and Azita Hajian were the first ones to propose her a role for The Fateful Day. She auditioned for acting in The Fateful Day but refused to cooperate and the role went to Ladan Mostofi. Before acting in The King, she refused a part in Leila directed by Iranian director Dariush Mehrjui. Kianoush Ayari then approached her for acting in his movie, To Be or Not to Be and again she refused to play. Masoud Kimiayi was the first director who succeeded to have her playing in his film The King.

== Personal life ==
The actress was arrested in 2016, in Tehran's central Lala Garden for campaigning for animal rights, due to the gathering not being authorized by the government. The protest was organized after several Iranian municipalities put down a number of street dogs due to over population. The arrest has been condemned by some activists.

== Filmography ==
=== Film ===
Year	Title	Role	Director	Notes	Ref(s)
1997	The King	Maryam Koohsari	Masoud Kimiai		
1998	As a Stranger	Behrokh Sabeti	Ahmad Amini		
1999	Siavash	Hedieh Tehrani	Saman Moghaddam		
1999	Hemlock	Sima Riahi	Behrooz Afkhami		
1999	Red	Hasti Mashreghi	Fereydoun Jeyrani		
1999	An Umbrella for Two	Yasaman Pakravan	Ahmad Amini		
2000	Corrupt Hands	Diba	Sirus Alvand		
2001	The Party	Negar Aryani	Saman Moghaddam		
2001	Blue	Mahtab	Hamid Labkhandeh		
2001	The Times	Zari	Hamid Reza Selahmand		
2002	Unruled Paper	Roya Royaee	Naser Taghvai		
2002	A House Built on Water	Zhaleh Tirandaz	Bahman Farmanara		
2003	Donya	Donya Shadab	Manouchehr Mosiri		
2003	A Place to Live	Golchehreh	Mohammad Bozorgnia		
2003	Abadan	Arezoo	Mani Haghighi	Banned	
2003	Iranian Girl	Maryam Yazdani	Mohammad Hossein Latifi		
2004	Duel	Hanieh	Ahmad Reza Darvish		
2005	Thirteen		Vahid Rahbani	Short Film	
2005	A Little Kiss	Mysterious Woman / The Death Angel	Bahman Farmanara		
2006	Fireworks Wednesday	Mozhdeh Samiee	Asghar Farhadi		
2006	Half Moon	Hesho	Bahman Ghobadi		
2007	To Each His Own Cinema	Herself	Abbas Kiarostami		
2007	The Magical Generation	Forough	Iraj Karimi		
2009	Shirin	Woman in audience	Abbas Kiarostami		
2010	Seven Minutes Until Autumn	Mitra	Alireza Amini		
2011	The Son of Dawn	Khomeini's Nursemaid	Behrooz Afkhami		
2011	Nightly	Shabnam Nami	Omid Bonakdar		
2012	Tehran 1500	Nazi	Bahram Azimi		
2012	The Wooden Bridge	Nazli	Mehdi Karampour		
2012	Another Day		Hassan Fathi		
2015	For a Rainy Day		Faezeh Azizkhani		
2016	Duet	Minoo	Navid Danesh		
2016	We Will Not Get Used To	Sima	Ebrahim Ebrahimian		
2016	Phenomenon		Ali Ahmadzadeh	Unreleased film	
2017	Israfil	Mahi	Ida Panahandeh		
2017	No Date, No Signature	Sayeh	Vahid Jalilvand		
2018	Orange Days	Aban	Arash Lahooti		
2019	A Hairy Tale	Homa	Homayoun Ghanizadeh		
2019	Lovely Trash	Sima	Mohsen Amiryoussefi		
2020	Shahre Gheseh Cinema		Keyvan Alimohammadi, Ali Akbar Heidari		
2021	Majority	Lily Nazarian	Mohsen Gharaee		

=== Web ===
Year	Title	Role	Director	Platform	Notes
2012–2014	Frozen Heart	Sayeh Solat	Saman Moghaddam	Namava	Main role
2020	The Accomplice	Ziba Fakhri	Mostafa Kiaee	Filimo, Namava	Main role
2025	1001 Nights	Sara Parnian	Mostafa Kiaee	Filimo	Supporting role

== Awards and nominations ==
Award	Year	Category	Nominated Work	Result
Busan International Film Festival	2006	Best Actress in a Leading Role	Fireworks Wednesday	Nominated
Fajr Film Festival	1999	Best Actress in a Leading Role	Red	Won
Fajr Film Festival	2002	Best Actress in a Leading Role	Unruled Paper	Nominated
Fajr Film Festival	2006	Best Actress in a Leading Role	Fireworks Wednesday	Won
Fajr Film Festival	2010	Best Actress in a Leading Role	Seven Minutes Until Autumn	Nominated
Fajr Film Festival	2017	Best Actress in a Leading Role	Israfil	Nominated
Hafez Awards	1997	Best Actress – Motion Picture	The King	Won
Hafez Awards	1999	Best Actress – Motion Picture	Red	Nominated
Hafez Awards	2000	Best Actress – Motion Picture	Hemlock	Won
Hafez Awards	2002	Best Actress – Motion Picture	Unruled Paper	Won
Hafez Awards	2002	Top Actors in Cinema of Iran After The Iranian Revolution	–	Won
Hafez Awards	2003	Best Actress – Motion Picture	Iranian Girl	Nominated
Hafez Awards	2006	Best Actress – Motion Picture	Fireworks Wednesday	Nominated
Hafez Awards	2018	Best Actress – Motion Picture	Israfil	Nominated
Hafez Awards	2021	Best Actress – Television Series Drama	The Accomplice	Nominated
Hafez Awards	2023	Best Actress – Motion Picture	Majority	Nominated
Imagineindia International Film Festival	2019	Best Actress in a Leading Role	Orange Days	Nominated
International Filmfestival Mannheim-Heidelberg	2019	Best Actress in a Leading Role	Orange Days	Nominated
Iran Cinema Celebration	2000	Best Actress in a Leading Role	Hemlock	Nominated
Iran Cinema Celebration	2006	Best Actress in a Leading Role	Fireworks Wednesday	Won
Iran Cinema Celebration	2010	Best Actress in a Leading Role	Seven Minutes Until Autumn	Nominated
Iran's Film Critics and Writers Association	1999	Best Actress in a Leading Role	Red	Third Place
Iran's Film Critics and Writers Association	2000	Best Actress in a Leading Role	Hemlock	Won
Iran's Film Critics and Writers Association	2002	Best Actress in a Leading Role	Unruled Paper	Runner-up
Iran's Film Critics and Writers Association	2003	Best Actress in a Leading Role	Iranian Girl	Runner-up
Iran's Film Critics and Writers Association	2022	Best Actress in a Leading Role	Majority	Nominated
Pyongyang International Film Festival	2002	Best Actress in a Leading Role	The Party	Won
Three Continents Festival	1999	Best Actress in a Leading Role	Red	Nominated
