= Donya (film) =

- Directed by: Manuchehr Mosayeri
- Written by: Ali Rooyintan (draft); Farhad Tohidi (writer)
- Produced by: Ali Mazinani
- Starring: Hedieh Tehrani; Mohamad Reza Sharifinia; Gohar Kheirandish
- Edited by: Nazanin Mofakham
- Music by: Fariborz Lachini
- Release date: 2003
- Running time: 105 minutes
- Country: Iran
- Language: Persian

== Plot ==
Haj Enayat, a wealthy 60-year-old man, plans to sell his large house despite opposition from his wife. At his real estate agency, he meets Donya, a young woman who has recently returned from abroad and expresses interest in purchasing the property. He offers her temporary accommodation in one of his apartments while negotiations continue. Enayat becomes attracted to Donya and sends his wife and daughter on a pilgrimage to Syria. He moves closer to Donya and attempts to change his appearance to impress her. He eventually proposes, and she agrees to marry him on the condition that he transfers ownership of the house to her. When Enayat’s family returns, they are unaware of the marriage, and tensions arise. Donya reveals that she is his legal wife, leading to a breakdown in his family relationships. Later, Enayat becomes suspicious of Donya and confronts her. She reveals that the house originally belonged to her family before the revolution and that Enayat had taken possession of it afterward. Her actions were intended to reclaim the property. Enayat is left alone as the consequences of his actions become clear.

== Cast ==
- Hediyeh Tehrani as Donya Shadab
- Mohamad Reza Sharifinia as Reza Enayat
- Gohar Kheirandish as Reza's wife
- Farajollah Golsefidi as Naser
- Soroosh Goodarzi as Mohsen
- Elham Hamidi as Shadi
- Majid Moshiri
