= The Gun Loaded =

2002 television series

- Also known as: Tofange Sarpor
- Persian: تفنگ سرپر
- Genre: Drama, History War
- Written by: Amrollah Ahmadjoo
- Directed by: Amrollah Ahmadjoo
- Starring: Hamid Reza Pegah; Khosrow Shakibai; Zhaleh Olov; Anoushirvan Arjmand; Fathali Oveisi; Hushang Harirchiyan; Parvin Soleimani; Abbas Amiri Moghaddam; Atash Taqipour; Mina Jafarzadeh; Ferdous Kaviani; Manoochehr Azar
- Country of origin: Iran
- Original language: Persian
- No. of seasons: 1
- No. of episodes: 25

Production
- Producer: Mahmood Fallah
- Production location: Meymeh
- Running time: 45 – 55 minutes

Original release
- Release: 14 September 2002 – 6 March 2003

The Gun Loaded (Persian: تفنگ سرپر ; Tofang-e Sarpor) is an Iranian Drama and History War series. The series is written and directed by Amrollah Ahmadjoo.

== Storyline ==
It is the story of a young man named Ghaybish (Hamid Reza Pegah) who lives during the First World War. During this period, due to the dictatorship of Khans, local rulers, courtiers, Qajar princes and occupying foreigners, the days of the people are going through hardships and darkness. However, people are trying to maintain their reputation and their lives.

== Cast ==
- Hamid Reza Pegah
- Khosrow Shakibai
- Zhaleh Olov
- Anoushirvan Arjmand
- Fathali Oveisi
- Hushang Harirchiyan
- Parvin Soleimani
- Abbas Amiri Moghaddam
- Atash Taqipour
- Mina Jafarzadeh
- Ferdous Kaviani
- Manoochehr Azar
- Sadreddin Hejazi
- Shahin Alizadeh
- Mahbubeh Bayat
- Mohammad Fili
- Mohsen Ghassabian
- Parviz Shahinkhou
- Khosro dastgerdi
- Mehri Mehrnia
- Mostafa tari

== Awards and nominations ==
Year	Award	Category	Recipient	Result
2004	7th Hafez Awards	Best Actor in a drama Television series	Anoushirvan Arjmand	Nominated
