= Arya Aziminejad =

Iranian music composer (born 1973)

- آریا عظیمی‌نژاد
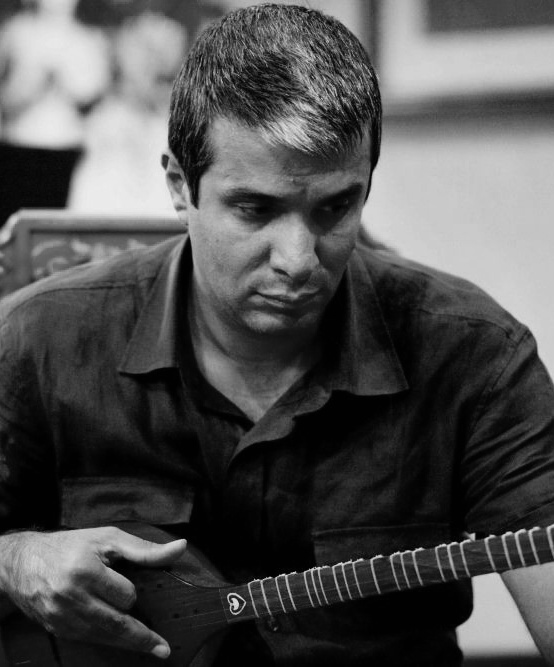
- Born: 25 April 1973 (age 53); Tehran, Iran
- Occupations: Composer, music producer
- Years active: 1987–present
- Website: AryaAziminejad.com

Arya Aziminejad (Persian: آریا عظیمی‌نژاد; born 25 April 1973) is an Iranian music composer.

== Biography ==
Aziminejad was born into a cultured family in Tehran. His first teacher was his grandfather who taught him to play setar. Arya's father, Jamshid Aziminejad has been an active figure in the field of children and teenagers. His program: Khaneye Aroosakha was highly popular TV serial for children; Arya and his sister, Poopak played in the serial. Aziminejad has a B.A. in music from Islamic Azad University of Tehran. He started playing music in 1987 and after a while started composing and editing music. One of his goals has been to mix local and regional music of Iran with modern music. Composing for the following plays made him a nominee for the best music in the Fajr International Theater Festival. He is a member of Mohammad Esfahani Music Orchestra. In 2019, he referee's in first Iranian Talent Show called Asre Jadid Produced by Ehsan alikhani.

== Works ==
=== Plays ===
- Ansooye Ayeneh (Persian: Over the Mirror)
- Gorg va mish (The Twilight)
- TALKH BAZI GHAMAR DAR AGHRAB (Persian title)
- Se sāl va nim (Three Years and Half)
- Ezhdehāk
- Hotel Aroos (The Bridal Hotel).

Composing for the following programs are among his works:

=== TV serials ===
- Pezeshkan (The Doctors)
- Kaktooshaye Bi shaksiat (Dishonest Cacti)
- Zange Akhar (The Last Ring)
- Kamin (Ambush)
- Khaneye Ma (Our House)
- In Rahash Nist (This Is Not The Way)
- Morvaride Sorkh (Red Pearl)
- Rozhaye Eteraz (Day of Protest)
- Nimkat (The Bench)
- Akharin Gonah (The Last Sin)
- Ou Yek Fereshteh Bood (She was an angel)
- Paridokht
- Roze Hasrat (Day of Regret)
- Rastgaran (The Redemption)
- Jerahat (Injury)
- Pas Az Salha (After Years)
- Chardivari
- Zire Hasht (Below Eight)
- Paytakht 1-5
- Ta Soraya
- Panj Kilometr Ta Behesht (Five Kilometers to the Paradise)
- Mesle Yek Kaboos (Like An Nightmare)
- Checke Bargashti
- Rahe Toolani (Long Way)
- Bidar Bash (Be Awake)
- Divar (The Wall)
- Doodkesh (The Chimney)
- Mikaeel
- Ghor'e (Lottery)
- Alal badal (Subbing)
- Safar Dar Khane (Trip at Home)
- Ehzar (Seance)

=== Short films ===
- Se Khahar (Persian: Three Sisters)
- Kif (The Bag)
- Darse Akhar (The Last Lesson)
- Poshte sar baad nemiayad (There is No Wind Blowing Behind)
- Un (That)
- Zard, Abi, Ghermez (Yellow, Blue, Red)

=== Movies ===
- Aroose Khosh Ghadam (The Lucky Bride)
- Neghab (The mask)
- Sahneye Jorm, Vorood Mamnoo
- Esghe mamnoo (Forbidden Love)
- Man VA Deboora (me and deboura)
- Aroosake Farangi (western dull)
- Hamishe Paye Yek Zan Dar Miyan Ast (there is always a woman in between)
- Farshe Irani (Iranian Carpet)
- Parkway
- Mim Mesle Madar, directed by Rasoul Mollagholipour
- Gold and Copper
- Zendegi Khososi (Private Life)
- A Few Kilos of Dates for a Funeral
- Zarzande Khak (The child of dust)
- An Sooye Roodkhane (Beyond the River)
- Nofozi
- Adamkosh (assassin)
- Bidari Rooyaha (awaking dreams)
- Behesht Injast (the paradise is here)
- Kaghaze Khoros Neshan
- Check
- Khabzadeha (dreamy)
- Tragedy
- Mastaneh
- Ein-Shin-Ghaf
- Princess of Rome
- Dar Modate Maloom (in certain time)
- Guinness
- Nim (half)
- Parvandeh ee Baraye Sara
- Abnabat Choobi (Lollipop)
- QANLI YANVAR
- Helen
- Khoob, Bad, Jelf (The Good, the Bad, the Corny)
- Janan
- Takhteh Gaz (Top Gear)
- Hame Chi Adiyeh (all are ok)
- 23 Nafar
- Bi Hessi Moze'ee (Local anesthesia)

==== Musical pieces ====
1. "Shekayate Hejran" (Mohammad Esfahani) Album Noon O Dalghak
2. Introduction to "Bar Atash", "Maro Ey Doost", "Monajat" (vocal music) in the album Barakat Mohammad Esfahani
3. Piece "Ghazal" in the album Bi Vajeh (with the voice of Mohammad Esfahani for Ali al-Ridha)
4. Piece "Zaer Bahar" (Singer: Mohammad Esfahani)
5. Arbaeen Hosseini "Harvaleh" (Singer: Amir Hossein Modarres and Hamid Reza Torkashvand)
6. Piece "Obour" (Singer: Hamidreza Torkashvand)
7. Piece "Zarbeh Davazdahom" (Singer:Hojjat Ashrafzadeh)
8. Piece "Only Love" (Singer: Reza Sadeghi)
9. Piece "Sooze Zulf" (Singer: Amir Hossein Modarres)
10. Piece "Amadam Ey Shah Panaham Bedeh"Mohammad Ali Karimkhani for Ali al-Ridha)
11. Tasar of the movie "Kissing the Moon-Like Face" (Singer: Mohammad Esfahani)
12. Piece of "Jan Khastegan" with the voice of Mohammad Ali Karimkhani for Ali al-Ridha
13. "Ey Karbala" (Singer: Mohammad Esfahani, unpublished)

==== Musicians ====
1. Setar playing in the introductory piece "Bar Atash", "Maro Ey Doost", "Monajat" and "Ba To" in the album Barakat (Singer: Mohammad Esfahani)
2. Setar playing "Shab Afrooz" in the album Noon O Dalghak, "Ta Man Bedidam Rooye To" in the album Mah Gharibistan (Singer: Mohammad Esfahani)
3. Setar playing in the album "Hal Man Bi To" (Alireza Assar)
4. Setar playing in the album "Gharibeh" (Fereydoun Asraei)
5. Setar playing in the album "Rah Bi Payan" (Pouya Nikpour)
6. Setar playing in cinematic music "Caótica Ana" composed by Jocelyn Pook made in Spain
7. Setar playing in the movie music "Brick Lane" composed by Jocelyn Pook made in England

=== Documentary ===
- Avaye Mah
- Baz Ay
- Vaghti Bbrha Paeen Miayand (When clouds come down)
- Atlan
- Neshani (Address)
- Be Pooshte Tablo Negah Kon (Look Behind The Canvas)
- Labayk
- Dar Jostojoye Sayeh (Seeking Shade)

== Honor ==
- Nominee for the best music with Gold And Copper in the 28th Fajr International Theater Festival
- Nominee for the best music with The Child of Dust in the 26th Fajr International Theater Festival
- Won the prize of best fusion piece in first annual ceremony of musicema for "Azaye Alam"
- Nominee for the best music with Gold And Copper in the 14th ceremony of Iran cinema
- Nominee for the best music with The Child of Dust in the 12th ceremony of Iran cinema
- Won the prize of best music for documentary in 17th annual ceremony of khanehcinema for "Atlan"

== Sources ==
- Cinema 1 website
- Cover of the Mim for Mother Soundtrack album.
