= Parvin Soleimani =

Iranian actress (1922–2009)

- پروین سلیمانی
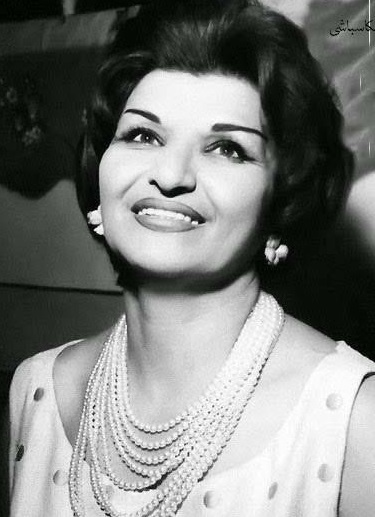
- Born: Batoul Soleimani-Khoo; 13 June 1922; Tehran, Sublime State of Iran
- Died: 1 June 2009 (aged 86); Tehran, Iran
- Occupation: Actress
- Years active: 1944–2008
- Relatives: Mahchehreh Khalili (granddaughter)

Parvin Soleimani (Persian: پروین سلیمانی; 13 June 1922 – 1 June 2009) was an Iranian actress of theater and cinema, who dedicated over 60 years of her life to Iranian art and cinema. She died at the age of 86 in Tehran.

== Career ==
Parvin Soleimani was born in 1922 in Tehran. She began her artistic career in 1944 at the age of 22 with the play "Shahrzad, the Narrator" in theater. She also began to work in radio in those years.

"Golnesa" by Serj Azarian was her first movie in the cinema in 1952. She played in over 80 films including "Ehtejab Prince" (Bahman Farmanara), "The Deer" (Masud Kimiaii), "Shadow of Scorpion" (Kianush Ayyari), and "The Demon" (Ahmadreza Darvish).

Soleimani had also played in several TV films and series like "Noruz Vacation," "Auntie Sara," "School of Grandmas" and "Filthy Thought".

"Actor" (1993), "What's Up?" (1992), "Wilderness" (1989), "Beyond the Fire" (1988), "specter of the scorpion", (1987) and "Flowers and Bullets" (1991) are among her films that will be remembered by all Iranians.

Soleimani was hospitalized with respiratory and heart conditions for a few months and died on June 1, 2009 at the age of 86.

== Selected filmography ==
- The Gun Loaded (2002–2003)
- Ghazal (2001)
- Panje dar khak (1997) (Claws in the Dust)
- Soltan (1996)
- Safar be kheir (1994) (Bon Voyage!)
- Akharin khoon (1993) (The Last Blood)
- Mosta'jer (1992)
- Ansuyeh Atash (1988) (Beyond the Fire)
- Barahoot (1988)
- Sorb (1988) (The Lead)
- Ashianeye mehr (1987)
- Simorgh (1987)
- Bogzar zendegi konam (1986)
- Shabah-e kazhdom (1986) ("Spectre of Scorpion" or (Spectre of the Scorpion)
- Samandar (1985)
- Tanoure-ye Deev (1985) ("The Monster" or "Wailing of the Devil")
- Bagh-e boloor (1979)
- Tuti (1978)
- Hezar bar mordan (1977)
- Bot (1976) (The Idol)
- Daii jan Napelon (1976) (My Uncle Napoleon)
- Gavaznha (1976) (The Deer)
- Boof-e koor (1975) (The Blind Owl)
- Ghazal (1975)
- The Beehive (1975) - directed by Fereydun Gole
- Zabih (1975)
- Jooje fokoli (1974)
- Kaniz (1974)
- Salat-e zohr (1974)
- Shazdeh Ehtejab (1974) (Prince Ehtejab)
- Khak (1972) (The Soil)
- Sobh-e rooz-e chaharom (1972) (The Morning of the Fourth Day)
