= Jamileh Sheykhi =

Iranian actress (1930–2001)

- جمیله شیخی
- Born: 30 April 1930; Zanjan, Iran
- Died: 23 May 2001 (aged 71); Tehran, Iran
- Occupation: Actress
- Children: Atila Pesyani
- Relatives: Setareh Pesyani (granddaughter); Fatemeh Naghavi (daughter-in-law)

Jamileh Sheykhi (Persian: جمیله شیخی, 30 April 1930 – 23 May 2001) was an Iranian actress and the mother of actor Atila Pesyani.

== Career ==
She made her stage debut in 1957 and began film acting with Shipwreck (1975, Nosrat Karimi). As a pioneer and veteran character actress of Iranian theatre and cinema, she performed in a number of films with reputable directors. Sheykhi had a distinguished screen appearance in Travellers (1991, Bahram Bayzai) and won the Best Actress award at the International Fajr Film Festival.

== Selected filmography ==
- Visa
- The Little Bird of Happiness, 1987
- Mosāferan (Travellers), 1992, directed by Bahram Bayzai
- Leila, 1996, directed by Dariush Mehrjoui
- Kaghaz-e Bi Khatt (Unruled Paper), 2001, directed by Naser Taghvai
