= The Mix (film) =

- Directed by: Dariush Mehrjui
- Screenplay by: Dariush Mehrjui
- Produced by: Sirus Taslimi
- Music by: Naser Cheshmazar
- Release date: 2000
- Running time: 95 min
- Country: Iran
- Language: Persian

The Mix (Persian: میکس) is a 2000 film by the Iranian director Dariush Mehrjui. The film was scripted by Mehrjui and lensed by Mahmoud Kalari. It starred Khosro Shakibai, Negar Foroozandeh, Mohamad Reza Sharifinia, Leila Hatami and Ali Mosaffa.

== Cast ==
- Khosro Shakibai
- Negar Foroozandeh
- Mohamad Reza Sharifinia
- Leila Hatami
- Ali Mosaffa
