= Atila Pesyani =

Iranian actor (1957–2023)

- آتیلا پسیانی
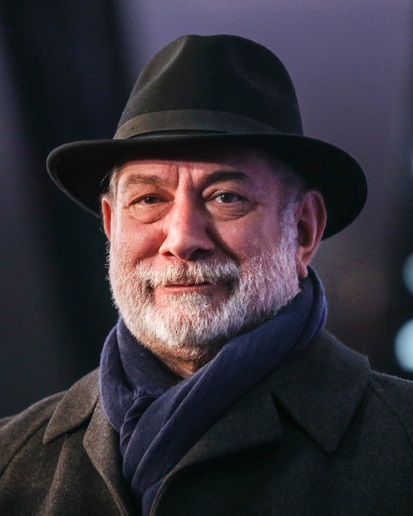
- Pesyani in 2019
- Born: 30 April 1957; Tehran, Iran
- Died: 6 October 2023 (aged 66); Paris, France
- Resting place: Behesht-e Zahra Cemetery
- Education: College of Fine Arts
- Occupation: Actor
- Years active: 1984–2023
- Spouse: Fatemeh Naghavi (m. 1979)
- Children: 2, including Setareh
- Parent: Jamileh Sheykhi (mother)

Atila Pesyani (Persian: آتیلا پسیانی; 30 April 1957 – 6 October 2023) was an Iranian actor.

== Life and career ==
Atila Pesyani was born in Tehran on 30 April 1957. He was the son of actress Jamileh Sheykhi.

Among the films in which he performed are The Hidden Half (2001), Ceasefire 1 and 2 (2005 and 2014), Hidden Feeling (2006), Throughout the Night (2010), The Redemption (2010), The President's Cell Phone (2011) and The Wooden Bridge (2011). Some series which he played roles in are The First Night of Peace (2006), Privacy Policy (2009), Goodbye Child (2012), A Piece of Land (2012), Like a Mother (2013), Madineh (2014) and A Beautiful Revolution (2014). Pesyani received a nomination for the Best Supporting Actor Golden Statue for the movies Two Women (1998), The Burnt Generation (1999), The Last Supper (2001) and Who Killed Amir? (2005) as well as a nomination for the Crystal Simorgh's Best Leading Actor for In Cold Blood (1994) from the Fajr International Film Festival.

Pesyani died of stomach cancer on 6 October 2023, at the age of 66.
