= Unruled Paper =

2002 film

- (Source: hedieh1351)
- Directed by: Nāser Taghvā'i
- Written by: Nāser Taghvā'i and Minoo Farsh'chi
- Produced by: Hasan Tavakkol'niā; Yektā Film, Tehran, 2001 (1380 AH)
- Starring: Khosrow Shakibai; Hadyeh Tehrani; Jamshid Mashayekhi; Arin Matlabi; Hānieh Morādi; Jamileh Sheykhi; Nikoo Kheradmand; Akbar Moazzezi; Soghra Obeysi
- Cinematography: Farhād Sabā. Assistants: Majid Farzāneh and Ābtin Sahāmi
- Music by: Kāren Homāyounfar
- Release date: February 2002
- Running time: 110 minutes
- Country: Iran
- Language: Persian

Unruled Paper (Persian: کاغذ بی‌خط, Kāghaz-e bi Khatt) is a 2002 Iranian film directed by Nāser Taghvā'i (his first after twelve years), based on an original script by Nāser Taghvā'i and Minoo Farsh'chi. The film was produced in 2001 by Yektā Film.

The principal roles in the film are played by Khosrow Shakibai (Jahāngir) and Hadyeh Tehrani (Royā). For his role, Khosrow Shakibai was nominated for the Crystal Phoenix Award, in the category of men, at the 20th Fajr International Film Festival in 2002, received the second Best Actor Of The Year Award From Writers and Critics, in the category of men, in 2002, and was awarded the Golden Tablet from Iran Actor Site in 2003. Hadyeh Tehrani's acting in this film has been praised by many critics as equally superb and laudable. For her role, she was nominated for the Crystal Phoenix Award, in the category of women, at the 20th Fajr International Film Festival in 2002. The title of the film is derived from a remark by Royā that she never was able to write neatly on a ruled paper, but this changed when she wrote on unruled paper, thus giving voice to the blessings of freedom.

The film, with a strong cast of Iranian actors, received critical acclaim in Iran: Various critics have described the movie's dialogues as pithy and thought-provoking, and the language used as both natural and powerful. The quality of the acting and directing have both been praised as well. Taghvā'i attempts to pay attention to the most minute details of the film (for instance, the accuracy with which the separate consecutive shuts match, or the precision of the angles at which the communicating actors look away from the camera). As Tahmineh Milani once has noted, accuracy of presentation is one of the hallmarks of Nāser Taghvā'i's films. The dialogues of the film are replete with terse remarks and critical commentaries on the contemporary political and social conditions prevailing in Iran.

== Plot ==
The film starts with a scene of a sitting room, empty of people, at some two minutes to 7 o'clock in the morning, and ends with a scene of the same empty room at some two minutes past 7 o'clock in the morning of some weeks later; this passage of time is accurately depicted by the brightness of the natural light that is reflected on the wall of a corridor, that leads to this sitting room, in the initial and final scenes. The meticulous attention that Taghvā'i has given to the accurate representation of even the most mundane aspects of the film would at first sight seem to be at odds with the fact that with the exception of the opening and closing scenes, in all other scenes where the clock on the wall of the sitting room is in sight, its pendulum is conspicuously motionless. The opening scene depicts some moments before the family starts a very active day (the day at which the two children of the family, Shangul and Mangul, have their first school-day after the summer school-holiday) and the closing scene, the end of a protracted Friday night, during which Jahāngir and Royā have spent an intellectually and emotionally exhausting night. The motionless pendulum suggests that the events in the intervening period have taken place out of time, or only in imagination. Although the work presented by Taghvā'i certainly qualifies as a surrealist art-form, this motionless pendulum serves as a more profound tool than a means that solely hints at surrealism. Taghvā'i conveys a number of unobtrusive verbal and visual messages to his viewers. Briefly, Taghvā'i and Ms Minoo Farsh'chi, the co-author of the film script, variously refer to the theory of eternal recurrence, as revived by e.g. Friedrich Nietzsche, with a strong emphasis on the importance of having a creative mind thereby to forge room for free will in at least an imaginative world.

Jahāngir is a draughtsman, or perhaps an architect. Royā is normally a housewife, but has recently started to attend a course on writing film scripts, an undertaking that has been actively encouraged by Jahāngir. Taghvā'i introduces his viewers to Royā's penchant for story telling through a scene in which she tells a bedtime story for Shangul and Magul, the story being in reality a popular Persian children's story which is very reminiscent of The Wolf and the Seven Young Kids. This scene also reveals the two children as being both imaginative and highly theatrical. The names Shangul and Magul are the names of two baby goats in the same story; there is no hint in the film however that Shangul and Magul might be the pet names of the children, as opposed to their real names.

Jahāngir is working on a project that he apparently has initially introduced to Royā as being a villa on an island, but that Royā has later discovered that it is a prison compound on the island. Following an intense argument between Jahāngir and Royā, Jahāngir reveals that he himself is deeply unhappy about his project, as his colleagues have nicknamed the prison compound as Jahāngir's Villa. An apparently innocuous argument between Jahāngir and Royā, married already for twelve years, thus leads to an intense and emotional flow of exchanges revolving around the subject matter of how well even closest individuals know each other and the reason why Jahāngir reacts nervously to Royā's curiosity regarding his past. The deliberately ambiguous circumstance in which the intense discussion between Royā and Jahāngir takes place, greatly enhances the power of the words exchanged between the two characters. On the one hand, one is given the impression that Royā is curious because she is preparing her first film script for her class and that she must be using her husband's character in her story. On the other hand, while Jahāngir appears to be disconcerted, one cannot escape the suspicion that he may in fact be a willing participant in the creation of the script that Royā is in the process of creating. Jahāngir never fails to ease the tension by using his dark humour when the going gets tough. It has been speculated that what one is witnessing is the film, or at least a rehearsal of it, is actually based on the script written by Royā, with all the members of the family playing their allotted roles.

The philosophical messages of the film are mostly conveyed by the professor of literature (Jamshid Mashayekhi) who teaches the course that Royā attends. His reflective manners and insightful statements convincingly portray him as a wise academic who has lived a profound life. In a pivotal scene, while being driven by Royā to his home, in the vicinity of "the end of the world", he says:

"This world in which we live is not fit for working. Before I and you everything in it has already been invented. The world of your story is a kind of a world that you have to create yourself; if you want it to revolve on its axis, it must revolve by your will; when you want the sun to shine, it must shine, and when you do not want it to shine, it must disappear behind the clouds; when you want that it rains, the rain must descend from the sky; if you don't wish that it rains, wish it, and the rain will stop."

In the one but the penultimate scene of the film, Nāser Taghvā'i introduces a visual metaphor, indicative of the intimacy between a husband and wife. This metaphor, which consists of a knife falling from the table to the ground and subsequently being simultaneously retrieved by Jahāngir and Royā, with the former grasping the handle of the knife firmly in his fist, and the latter fixing her fingers on the sides of the blade. Of note is the fact that in the motion pictures made in Iran men and women are not permitted to have physical contact.

== Details ==
=== Cast ===
- Khosrow Shakibai: Jahāngir, husband of Royā and father of Shangul and Mangul. Jahāngir is presented in the movie as a protagonist; a kind and liberal husband (however sometimes he demonstrates the repressed emotions of a traditional man). He gladly entertains the guests and does not even contemplate to ask Royā her reason for coming home after midnight, in complete disregard of the guests that she herself had invited. These aspects are dramatically counterbalanced by his ripostes to some of Royā's protests. For instance, when Royā complains about the state of the kitchen following her absence from home for several days, rather than offering a helping hand, Jahāngir proposes that she should take rest and leave the cleaning of the kitchen for the next day when she feels fresh.
- Hadyeh Tehrani: Royā, wife of Jahāngir and mother of Shangul and Mangul. She is depicted as an aspiring writer of film scripts, and desirous of becoming wealthy. Jahāngir suggests that she should become a professional writer, while at the same time warns that her strong reliance on her imagination, and her day-dreaming, may prove detrimental to the upbringing of their children (Royā is the Persian word for dream and vision). As the time passes by and the plot advances further, viewers are led to wonder whether the film one views is the creation of Royā herself, with all the members of the family the willing participants as the actors of the film.
- Jamshid Mashayekhi: Professor (of Literature), teaching a crash course of writing for aspiring writers of film scripts. He is very philosophical and rather enigmatic, although is very well loved by his pupils. When on a rainy night, after the end of a class, Royā offers to drive him to his home, he says, without being sardonic, that he lives very far, in the vicinity of "the end of the world". While introducing the first feature film made in Iran in the course of one of his lectures, he mentions that on the day that this film was screened in Tehran for the first time, "68 years ago", he was born. One of the advises that he gives to his pupils is to forget all the books that they have read and all the films that they have watched, and begin writing their first film scripts by delving into their own personal lives and experiences. Royā seems to take this advice to heart.
- Arin Matlabi: Shangul, son of Jahāngir and Royā and the elder brother of Mangul; he is about nine years old. The names Shangul and Mangul are that of two baby goats in a popular Iranian story for children (this story is very reminiscent of The Wolf and the Seven Young Kids). The film does not make explicit whether Shangul and Mangul are pet names, used by the family and friends, or real names.
- Hānieh Morādi: Mangul, daughter of Jahāngir and Royā and the younger sister of Shangul; she is about seven years old.
- Jamileh Sheykhi: Aziz, widowed mother of Royā. She is outright and in many respects looks like someone with her feet squarely on the ground. Yet, when her friend, Esmat Khānom, asks her about the pestle, in the most serious tone, she responds that "our pestle gets lost every evening. ... I take it to my bed and during nights put in under my pillow."
- Nikoo Kheradmand: Esmat Khānom, a good friend of Aziz. Visiting Aziz on her way back to her home after visiting the graveside of her late husband, Ahmad, Aziz asks Esmat Khānom whether she feels a sense of peace for having visited her husband's graveside. After some thought and hesitation, Esmat Khānom answers first that she does not know, and then says no. Later, she says that when she contemplates, she comes to the realisation that in the year since her husband has died, she has not become lonelier than the thirty years that she had lived with him.
- Akbar Moazzezi: Ali, friend and colleague of Jahāngir. He is the husband of Susan Jān who is a friend and confidante of Royā.
- Soghra Obeysi: Susan Jān (sometimes also Susan Joon), wife of Ali and close friend and confidante of Royā. She surfers from marital problems at home, but does not hesitate to give marital advice to Royā. Jahāngir, although very courteous towards Susan Jān, in her absence shows signs of being annoyed by her inquisitiveness and interference in his private family life. Although Jān (as well as Joon) is a term of endearment in Persian (the actual name of Susan Jān being simply Susan), the way Jahāngir pronounces Jān in saying Susan Jān, signifies a considerable measure of patronising on his part, reflecting his deep irritation by Susan's interference in his family life.
- Shāhin Jafari: Mohandes, a friend and colleague of Jahāngir and Ali. We see him only once as a guest at a small party held at the house of Jahāngir and Royā.
- Mahmoud Beheshti: Taxi Driver. Although he is only seen twice, his two brief exchanges with Royā are crucial to the plot.

=== Make-up ===
- Soudābeh Khosravi in collaboration with Nāzanin Emāmi and Mohammad-Ali Zarrābi

=== Special effects ===
- Majid Shahbāzi

=== Location design and costume ===
- Fāzel Zhyān

=== Sound Management ===
- Jahangir Mirshekari

== See also ==
- Cinema of Iran
- Bāgh-e Ferdows
