= Noora (film) =

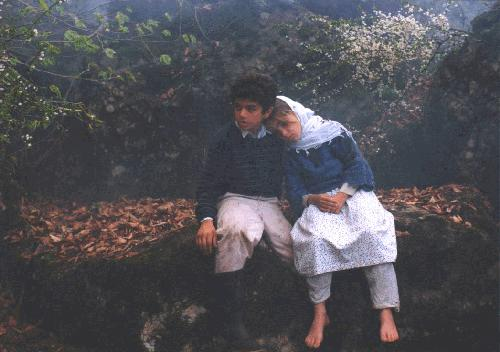
- Directed by: Mahmoud Shoolizadeh
- Written by: Mahmoud Shoolizadeh
- Produced by: Javad Zahiri (I.R.I.B, Ch1)
- Starring: Mohammad Abassi; Masoomeh Yousefi; Farhad Aeesh; Maedeh Tahmasebi
- Cinematography: Farzad Jodat
- Edited by: Jila Ipakchi
- Music by: Majid Entezami
- Release date: 2002
- Running time: 84 min.
- Country: Iran
- Languages: Persian, with English subtitles

Noora (The Kiss of Life) is the first fiction film directed by Mahmoud Shoolizadeh, it has participated in major international film festivals and has won many awards. This film is the story of a ten-year-old boy who lives with his father, mother, little sister and grandmother in a cottage in one of the jungles in the north of Iran. His little sister became paralyzed in an accident. All the family members start an endeavour to solve the problem, but the boy selects a special way and shows his iron will facing the difficulties. The two children can recognize a new meaning for life in the process of the story. They reach tranquility through their spiritual ascension. This film is now available on YouTube in Persian language with Hungarian subtitles.

== Director’s View ==
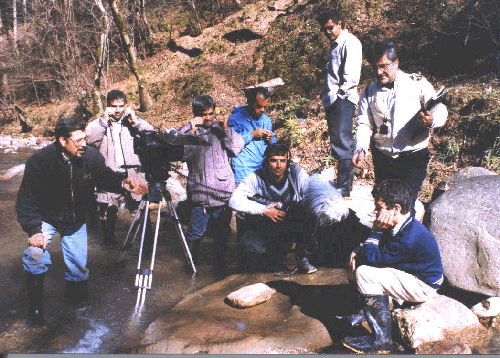
Film director Mahmoud Shoolizadeh(left) directing an actor along with other film crew

"Noora is simple and without any mysterious complexity. The story, characters and their relations are all simple. It starts with a childish play of a brother (Niaz) and sister (Noora) and then continues in huge developments in their lives. Through passing too many difficult barriers, these lovely children, reach the peak of perfection. Niaz, the ten-year-old child experiences the pain of being kind. He grows like a grain and blossoms."

"I tried my best to utilize the visual and technical elements that are suitable for the contents of the story. Using the minimum dialogue and transferring the sense and condition by image, utilizing the nature for transferring the concepts, producing a natural, real and live environment are parts of my goals in making this film in order to create a real belief for the viewers."

== Awards ==
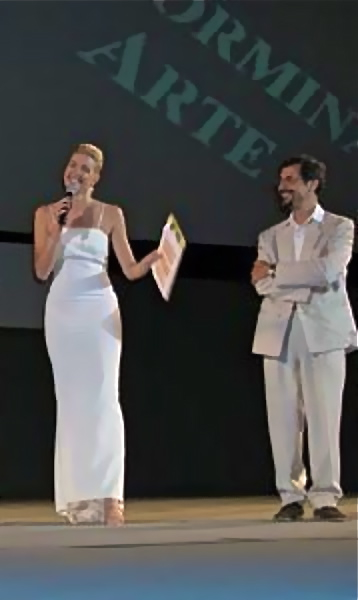
Director Mahmoud Shoolizadeh in the Taormina BNL Film Fest 2003

1. Award for Best Script and special appreciation at the 16th International Children and youth film festival Isfahan - October 2001
2. Award for Best Child actress award at the 16th International Children and youth film festival Isfahan - October 2001
3. Award for Best Set design at the 6th Iran Cinema Film Festival - Tehran - September 2002
4. Award for Best Music at the 6th Iran Cinema Film Festival - Tehran - September 2002
5. Award for Best Director at the 4th Cima Festival (Iran TV) - Tehran - October 2003
6. Award for Best Film at the Azra Film Festival - Tehran - October 2003
7. Award for Best Film Award of the audience at the 49th Taormina BNL Film Fest in Italy, June 2003; the Scarabeo d'oro Award sponsored by Aprilia
8. Award for Best Feature Film at the Indian Cine Film Festival (ICFF-07) - 2007.
