= To Have or Not to Have =

2001 film by Niki Karimi

- Directed by: Niki Karimi
- Written by: Niki Karimi
- Produced by: Abbas Kiarostami
- Release date: 2001
- Running time: 45 minutes
- Country: Iran
- Language: Persian with English subtitles

To Have or Not to Have (Dashtan Va Nadashtan) is a 2001 Iranian documentary film. It was the debut writing and directorial effort of Niki Karimi.

== See also ==
- Niki Karimi
- Abbas Kiarostami
- Cinema of Iran
