= Yassamin Maleknasr =

- یاسمین ملک‌نصر

Yassamin Maleknasr (also spelled Yasman Malek-Nasr, born 19 May 1955, Tehran, Iran) is an Iranian filmmaker and actress.

== Career ==
Yassamin Maleknasr is the first Iranian woman filmmaker to graduate from the University of Southern California (USC) in Film and Television Production. She did post-graduate work in drama at Towson State University in Maryland.

She made her first short film, Jazz Ballet in the U.S.; then after several years working at American film companies, she returned to Tehran to perform in Dariush Mehrjui's film Sara (1993) for which she won a "Best Supporting Actress" award from the Fajr International Film Festival in Tehran. She has also acted in a number of other Iranian features.

In 1995, Maleknasr directed and acted in her first feature film, "Common Plight".

In 2002, she took a journey with a small crew throughout war-torn Afghanistan and traveled more than 3,000 miles by land to make her acclaimed film, “Afghanistan: the Lost Truth”. Her lyrical documentary, "Women of the Silk Road", depicts the lives of four women from four countries of the Silk Road is an exploration of women's lives today via textile along the ancient trade route. Shot in Iran, Turkey, Oman, and Tajikistan, it is a story of love, courage, and hope.

Her films have been screened at various networks such as Arte, France and Ireland, BBC, Australian, and New Zealand networks, TVC Spain, USHUAIA France, plus special screenings at the Screen Actors Guild – Los Angeles, United Nations – New York, World Bank – Washington DC, the United States Senate, and many universities across the United States.

== See also ==
- Iranian cinema
- List of famous Persian women
