= Abadan (film) =

- Directed by: Mani Haghighi
- Written by: Mani Haghighi
- Produced by: Ahmad Ali Moussavi; Mehdi Safavi; Jacques Tizabi
- Starring: Ehsan Amani; Saman Arastoo; Dariush Asadzade; Habib Dehghan Nasab; Shahrokh Foroutanian; Jamshid Mashayekhi; Fatemeh Motamed-Aria; Hedye Tehrani
- Cinematography: Mahmoud Kalari
- Edited by: Mastaneh Mohajer
- Release date: October 8, 2003
- Running time: 83 min
- Country: Iran
- Language: Persian

Abadan (Persian: آبادان) is a 2003 drama film by the Iranian filmmaker Mani Haghighi. It was his first feature film after making a few short films. Since the film was not pre-approved by Iran's Ministry of Culture and Islamic Guidance and because it included profanity and spoken references to extramarital relations, producers bypassed the 2003 Fajr International Film Festival in Tehran, having the film's world premiere in Chicago at the 2003 Festival of Films from Iran instead. It was also shown at the 2004 Tribeca Film Festival.

== Plot ==
Amir has always wished to travel to Abadan and now in his elderly days he wants to materialise his wish, but before doing so he needs to return a package to a friend. In this process he goes missing. Marjan, a middle-aged, middle-class Tehran resident and Amir's daughter, is distraught when her father goes missing. She goes to see her estranged husband, Aman, who reluctantly agrees to look for Amir, while Marjan watches over Aman's house, which is being renovated. Aman enlists the aid of his old friend, Atta, and the two drive off in search of Amir, who presumably took off to find an old friend whom he seems to have forgotten died years earlier.

== Cast ==
- Ehsan Amani as Aman
- Saman Arastoo
- Dariush Asadzade
- Habib Dehghan Nasab
- Shahrokh Foroutanian
- Jamshid Mashayekhi
- Fatemeh Motamed-Aria
- Hedye Tehrani
