= The Unwanted Girl =

- Directed by: Moezzodivan Fekri
- Written by: Moezzodivan Fekri
- Starring: Moezzodivan Fekri
- Release date: 31 October 1953
- Running time: 100 minutes
- Country: Iran
- Language: Persian

The Unwanted Girl (Persian: Dokhtare sar rahi) is a 1953 Iranian film directed by Moezzodivan Fekri.

== Bibliography ==
- Mohammad Ali Issari. Cinema in Iran, 1900-1979. Scarecrow Press, 1989.
