= Orange Days (film) =

Iranian drama film from 2017

- Directed by: Arash Lahoti
- Story by: Jamileh Daralshafaie; Arash Lahooti
- Produced by: Alireza Ghasemkhan
- Starring: Hedieh Tehrani, Ali Mosaffa, Mehran Ahmadi
- Edited by: Mehdi Hosseinvand
- Music by: Christoph Rezaie
- Release date: 2017
- Running time: 90 minutes
- Country: Iran
- Language: Persian

Orange Days is a 2017 Iranian drama film directed by Arash Lahoti. It stars Hedieh Tehrani, Ali Mosaffa and Mehran Ahmadi.

== Plot ==
The film centers on Aban, a 45-year-old woman and the only female contractor in the orange harvesting industry, which is dominated by men. To win the tender for the region's largest orange orchard, she risks everything, including her own home.

However, her male rivals begin to obstruct her contract, and she faces sabotage at every turn. The film follows Aban's journey as she fights against these unfair odds to prove her worth and complete the harvest with her crew of seasonal female workers.

== Cast ==
- Hedieh Tehrani as Aban
- Ali Mosaffa as Majid
- Mehran Ahmadi as Kazem
- Alireza Ostadi as Yaghub
- Zhila Shahi as Firuzeh
- Lili Farhadpour as Leila
- Sadaf Asgari as Maryam

== Awards and nominations ==
=== Awards ===
Country	Event	Award	Year	Ref.
Germany	67th Mannheim-Heidelberg Film Festival	Grand Newcomer Award Mannheim-Heidelberg	2018	
Germany	67th Mannheim-Heidelberg Film Festival	FIPRESCI International Film Critics' Prize	2018	
Germany	67th Mannheim-Heidelberg Film Festival	Prize of the Ecumenical Jury	2018	
North Korea	17th Pyongyang International Film Festival	Golden Torch Award	2019	
Sweden	Yari Film Festival	Best film award	2019	
Spain	Imagineindia International Film Festival	Golden Chakra	2019	
Spain	Imagineindia International Film Festival	Best Actress - Hedieh Tehrani	2019	

=== Nominations ===
Country	Event	Award	Year	Ref.
Brazil	Sao Paulo International Film festival	New Directors Competition (Best Film)	2018	
