= One Night (2005 film) =

- Film poster
- Persian: Yek Shab
- Directed by: Niki Karimi
- Written by: Niki Karimi
- Story by: Kambouziar Parvoti
- Produced by: jahangir kosari
- Starring: Hanieh Tavassoli, Saeed Ebrahimifar, Nader Torkaman, Abdolreza Fakhar
- Cinematography: Hossein Jafarian
- Edited by: Mastaneh Mohajer
- Music by: Peyman Yazdanian
- Release date: May 2005 (Cannes)
- Running time: 91 minutes
- Country: Iran
- Language: Persian

One Night (Persian: Yek Shab) is a 2005 Iranian film. It was the directorial debut of Niki Karimi.

The movie was screened in the Un Certain Regard section of the 2005 Cannes Film Festival.

== Plot ==
Negar (Hāni'eh Tavassoli) has been kicked out of home by her mother. She is left with no choice but to spend the night walking around the streets of Tehran where she meets three men who all have different stories.

== Festivals ==
One Night was screened at the following festivals:

- Cannes film festival 2005
- Munich Film Festival
- Osian's Connoisseur
- Toronto Film Festival
- Edition du Festival du film
- Sienna Film Festival
- Reykjavik International Film Festival 2005
- Brisbane International Film Festival 2006
- Vancouver Film Festival
- Gangnam Tyme Park Festival
- Kolkata International Film Festival, India 2014
