= A Few Days Later =

A Few Days Later (Chand Rooz Ba'd)
- Iran Poster
- Directed by: Niki Karimi
- Written by: Niki Karimi
- Produced by: Mohammad Reza Takhtkeshian
- Starring: Behrang Alavi; Ehsan Amani; Ali-Reza Anoushfar; Behzad Dorani
- Cinematography: Hossein Jafarian
- Edited by: Sepideh Abdolvahab
- Music by: Peyman Yazdanian
- Release date: 13 September 2006 (Toronto International Film Festival)
- Country: Iran
- Language: Persian with English subtitles

A Few Days Later (Chand Rooz Ba'd) is a 2006 Iranian motion picture by Niki Karimi.

The script for the movie won the Hubert Bals Fund of the Rotterdam Film Festival.

== See also ==
- Cinema of Iran
