= Mohammad Esfahani =

Iranian musician and singer (born 1966)

Mohammad Esfahani محمد اصفهانی
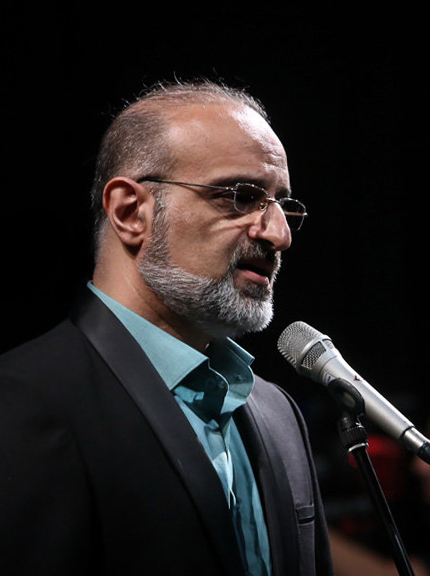

Background information
- Born: Mohammad Mahdi Vaezi Esfahani; 5 July 1966 (age 60); Tehran, Iran
- Occupations: Songwriter; singer; doctor
- Website: mohammadesfahani.com
- Musical career
- Genres: Persian pop; Persian traditional
- Instruments: Vocals; santur
- Years active: 1994–present
- Labels: Donya Music Group; Soroush Multimedia Inc; Hamavaz Ahang; Irangaam; Iran Seda Inc; Avaye Nakisa Records; Avaie Entezar; Payam Records; Avakhorshid; Payam Cultural Artistic Institute; Meshkat; Persia Records

Mohammad Mahdi Vaezi Esfahani (Persian: محمدمهدی واعظی اصفهانی; born 5 July 1966), better known as Mohammad Esfahani, is an Iranian pop and traditional music singer and composer. He holds a first-degree artistic certificate in Iranian traditional singing. Born in Tehran to a family originally from Isfahan, Esfahani graduated from Iran University of Medical Sciences in 1997. He studied Iranian music under the guidance of masters such as Mohammad Reza Shajarian and Ali Jahandar. Esfahani began his singing career by performing works based on poems by contemporary poets like Fereydoun Moshiri and by recording theme songs for television series. He was named the Best Pop Singer of the 2000s by Taraneh Mah magazine and the Best Theme Song Singer of 2012 by Musicema for his work on the series Ye Tikke Zamin.

Esfahani's first professional work was the theme song for the 1994 television series Avaye Fakhteh, with lyrics by Saaed Bagheri and directed by Bahman Zarrinpour, broadcast on Channel 1. To date, he has performed over 15 theme songs for television series and films, including notable works for series such as Ye Tikke Zamin, Armaghan-e Tariki, Velayat-e Eshgh, Zir-e Hasht, Ta Soraya, Masoomiat Az Dast Rafteh, Akharin Davat, Pahlavanan Nemimirand, and Vafa, as well as films like Boosidan Roye Mah and Ekhrajiha.

Esfahani has released 14 albums, collaborating with prominent musicians such as Homayoun Khorram, Babak Bayat, and Fereydoon Shahbazian. His debut album, Al-Noor, was an a cappella collection of prayers, supplications, and religious chants, featuring Esfahani and Abbas Salimi as lead vocalists, recorded with the Ahl-e Beit Tawasheeh group. Three of his albums Tanha-Tarin Sardar, Velayat-e Eshgh, and Ekhrajiha served as soundtracks for the respective television series and film. His album Tanha Mandam is a remastered collection of seven memorable pieces composed by Homayoun Khorram, while Noon va Dalghak, inspired by Charlie Chaplin, gained significant attention for addressing social issues and is recognized as the best-selling pop music album in Iran to date, according to the Ministry of Culture and Islamic Guidance. The album Hasrat, featuring Esfahani's own melodies and arrangements by Fouad Hejazi, achieved high sales due to the simultaneous broadcast of its music video on national television.

Another notable work, Bi-Vaje, was released on 2 May 2011 by Iran-Gam Music Publishing. This album introduced a fresh musical style and included a music video dedicated to Ali ibn Musa al-Reza. The publishing company reported that 200,000 copies of Bi-Vaje were sold within the first two weeks of release. In 2014, Esfahani released a five-track album titled Shekveh, themed around the Iran-Iraq War, with compositions by artists such as Majid Akhshabi, Alireza Kohandiri, and Pedram Keshtkar, and lyrics by poets including Ruhollah Khomeini, Hassan Hosseini, and Abduljabbar Kakaei.

== Biography ==
He was born in Tehran. His father, Mohammad Ali Vaezi, was a physician who was also the governor of Esfahan shortly after the revolution. He was of Esfahani descent, and his mother was born in Tehran. Mohammad Mehdi completed his primary and secondary education at the Alavi School and won a place in the juvenile category in the Quran competitions before the revolution. He was scheduled to be sent to Kuwait to win a position in the Quran competition, which was canceled due to his mother's opposition. From an early age, he learned to recite the Qur'an in three narrations from the masters of the time and has benefited from various methods of this art, especially the Mustafa Ismail method. Mohammad Mehdi entered Medical School of Iran University of Medical Sciences and graduated in 1997. He is married and has three children.

== Professional career ==
Esfahani has released 14 albums to date. In his albums, he has worked with great music masters such as Homayoun Khoram, Babak Bayat, Fereydoun Shahbazian. The wordless is the name of another work of Mohammad Esfahani; The wordless was released in a completely new atmosphere, the wordless is accompanied by a clip about Emam Reza, which has been released on this album. The album distribution company has announced that 200,000 copies of this work have been sold in the first 2 weeks of its release.

== National Orchestra of Iran ==
With the election of the new leader of the Iran's National Orchestra, Mohammad Esfahani was introduced as the singer of the National Orchestra.

=== Studio albums ===
- Alnour
- Golchin – (Iranian Classical Music)
- Tanhatarin Sardar
- Velayat-e Eshg – (Iranian SoundTrack)
- Hasrat
- Faseleh
- Tanha Mandam (I was left alone) – (Iranian National Music)
- Mah-e-Gharibestan (The Moon of Solitude)
- Noon o Dalghak
- Haft Sin (Iranian National Music)
- Ekhrajiha
- Barkat
- Hozour 1 (In live concert)
- Hozour 2 (In live concert)
- Bi Vajeh (Wordless)
- Shekveh

=== Singles ===
- Vasl o Hejran
- Zarrin Kolah
- Sabzeye Norooz
- Faryadras
- Hala ke Oumadi
- Armaghan Tariki
- Mahaleh Ashegham Basheh
- Nafas (Theme music of Nafas)
- Saghf
- Daghe Nahan
- Behesht Az Dast Adam Raft
