= Mostafa Kherghehpoosh =

Iranian film editor

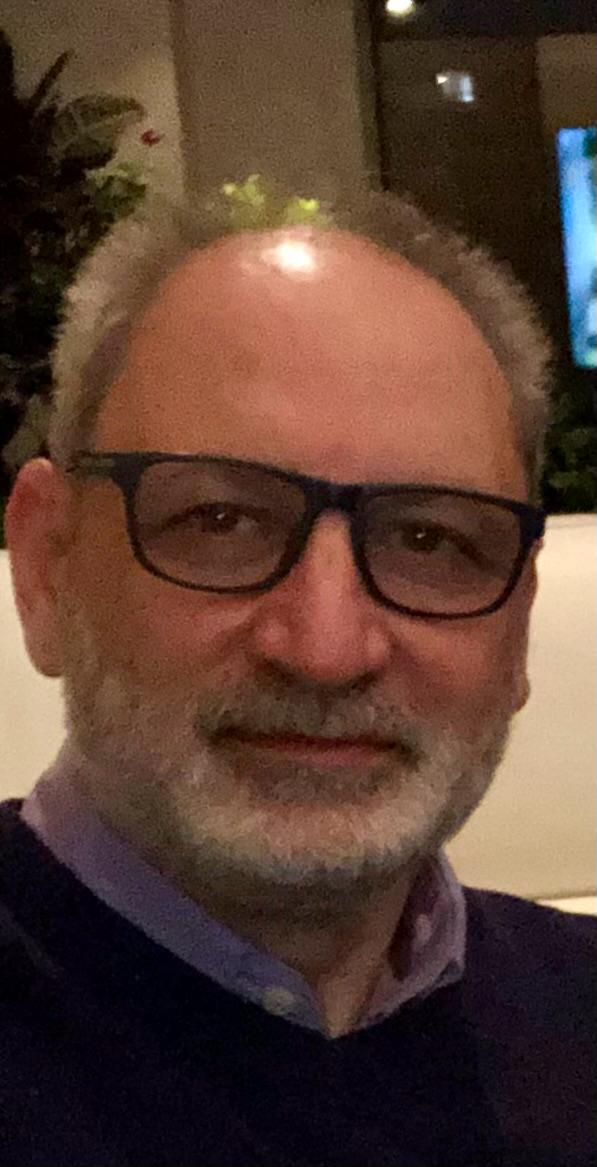
- Born: 1959 (age 66–67); Tehran, Iran
- Education: Film Editing, English Translation
- Occupation: Film Editor
- Years active: 1989–present
- Website: https://www.mostafaedit.com/

Mostafa Kherghehpoosh(Farsi مصطفی خرقه پوش) (born 1959 – Tehran) is an Iranian film editor based in Toronto. He began his independent career as an editor with the film Leila, directed by Dariush Mehrjui, and continued with The Pear Tree. In 1980, he graduated in film editing from the College of Television and Cinema. He later studied English translation at Allameh Tabataba’i University and graduated in 1991.

== Filmography ==
Film title	Director	Release year
I Deserve a Lover Whose Every Rise Sets Fiery Dooms Raging Across the Skies	Mani Haghighi	2026
After Love	Marjan Hashemi	2025
Papa Sierra	Arash Sajadi Hoseini	2025
Endless Journey	Omid Bahrani	2024
Drifting Stones	Samiramis Kia	2024
The Bridge	Rodrigue Hammal	2021
The Mirrorman	Pouyan Kazemi	2020
Silenced Tree	Faysal Soysal	2020
Reverse	Poulad Kimiaie	2019
The Truck	Kambozia Partovi	2018
My Brother Khosrow	Ehsan Biglari	2016
City of Mice 2	Marzie Bromand	2015
Metropole	Masoud Kimiaie	2014
Lovely Junks	Mohsen Amiryoussefi	2013
Berlin -7	Ramtin Lavafipour	2012
Parinaz	Bahram Bahramiyan	2011
Crime	Masoud Kimiaie	2010
No Men Are Allowed	Rambod Javan	2010
The Maritime Silk Road	Mohammad Bozorgnia	2009
Trial in The Street	Masoud Kimiaie	2009
Our Summer In Tehran	Justin Shapiro	2008
Three Women	Manijeh Hekmat	2008
The Boss	Masoud Kimiaie	2007
Rule of Play	Ahmad Reza Motamedi	2007
Havana File	Alireza Reisian	2006
Zagros	Mohammad Ali Najafee	2006
The Rival Wife	Alireza Davoodnejad	2006
Octopus	Alireza Davoodnejad	2005
Turtles Can Fly	Bahman Ghobadi	2004
Duel	Ahmad Reza Darvish	2004
Marriage, Iranian Style	Hassan Fathi	2004
Women’s Prison	Manijeh Hekmat	2002
One Flew Over the Cuckoo's Nest	Ahmad Reza Motamedi	2002
Under the Skin of the City	Rakhshan Bani Etemad	2001
Bread, Love and Motorcycle	Abolhassan Davoodi	2001
Bad Guys	Alireza Davoodnejad	2000
The Crimson Journey	Hamid Farokhnejad	2000
Alone in Tehran	Pirooz Kalantari	1999
The Girl in Sneakers	Rasool Sadr Ameli	1999
Stories of Island (Ep. 1) – The Lost Cousin	Dariush Mehrjui	1999
Stories of Island (Ep. 3) – Baran & the Native	Rakhshan Bani Etemad	1999
Two Women	Tahmine Milani	1999
May Lady	Rakhshan Bani Etemad	1997
The Pear Tree	Dariush Mehrjui	1997
Leila	Dariush Mehrjui	1996

== Television ==
- Under the Sunshade

== Awards and honours ==
New york Indipendent Art Film Festival

- Best Editing for Papa Siera _ 2025_ Winner

Torino Underground CINEFEST

- Best Editing for Silenced Tree – 2010 – Winner

Fajr International Film Festival

- Best Editing for The Truck – 2018 – Nominee
- Best Editing for Metropole – 2014 – Nominee
- Best Editing for Berlin -7 – 2012 – Nominee
- Best Editing for Crime – 2011 – Nominee
- Best Editing for Duel – 2004 – **Winner**
- Best Editing for Bread, Love and Motorcycle – 2001 – Nominee
- Best Editing for Pear Tree – 1998 – Nominee
- Best Editing for Leila – 1996 – Nominee

Donyaye Tasveer Film Festival

- Best Editing for Marriage, Iranian Style – 2006 – Winner
- Best Editing for Duel – 2004 – Winner
- Best Editing for Bad Guys – 2000 – Winner
- Best Editing for Two Women – 1999 – Winner
- Best Editing for Pear Tree – 1998 – Winner
- Best Editing for Leila – 1996 – Winner

Khane Cinema Film Festival

- Best Editing for Duel – 2004 – Winner
- Best Editing for Two Women – 1999 – Nominee
