= Kimiai =

Kimiai (alternatively Kimiayi or Kimiaei) is a surname. Notable people with the surname include:

- Masoud Kimiai (born 1941), Iranian director, screenwriter, and producer
- Poulad Kimiayi (born 1980), Iranian actor and film director
