= Iran Burger =

- Persian: ایران برگر
- Directed by: Masoud Jafari Jozani
- Written by: Masoud Jafari Jozani; Mohammad Hadi Karimi
- Produced by: Fathollah Jafari Jozani
- Starring: Ali Nassirian; Mohsen Tanabandeh; Sahar Jafari Jozani; Hamid Goodarzi; Niusha Zeighami; Hadi Kazemi; Ahmad Mehranfar; Shohreh Lorestani; Gohar Kheirandish; Mohammad-Reza Hedayati; Fariba Motekhasses; Mir-Taher Mazloomi
- Cinematography: Turaj Mansouri
- Edited by: Nima Jafari Jozani
- Distributed by: Filmiran
- Release date: 1 February 2015; Fajr Film Festival
- Running time: 113 Min
- Country: Iran
- Languages: Persian; Luri

Iran Burger (Persian: ایران برگر ; Iran Berger) is a 2015 Iranian Comedy,Drama film directed by Masoud Jafari Jozani.

== Plot ==
It is the story of Amrollah Khan (Ali Nassirian) and Fathollah Khan (Mohsen Tanabandeh), who compete with each other over the council elections in a village, and adventures ensue.The film crew is covering the competition.

== Margins ==
Before its public release, Iran Burger was screened in Khorramabad in the presence of a group of artists, intellectuals, and officials from Lorestan Province. Some critics believed that the use of Luri language in the film was inappropriate and it has contributed to the ongoing cultural offensive against Luri traditions and dialects.

== Cast ==
- Ali Nassirian as Amrollah Khan
- Mohsen Tanabandeh as Fathollah Khan
- Sahar Jafari Jozani as Maahgol
- Hamid Goodarzi as Sohrab
- Niusha Zeighami as Ms.Advisor
- Hadi Kazemi as Sohbat
- Ahmad Mehranfar as Roham
- Shohreh Lorestani as Jahan Banoo
- Gohar Kheirandish as Nane Nabat
- Mohammad-Reza Hedayati as Mr.Manager
- Fariba Motekhasses as Nane Hayat
- Mir-Taher Mazloomi as Hagh Nazar
- Esmaeel Khalaj as Noorollah
- Akbar Rahmati as Jomeh
- Sirous Meimanat as Director
- Bahram Afshari as Panjshanbeh
- Sadegh Tavakoli as Sardar Abdul Karim Zahed
- Radmehr Keshani as Assistant Director
- Somayeh Nojoomi as Taj Banoo
- Fathollah Jafari Jozani as Uncle Samad
- Siavash Cheraghipour

== Awards ==
Year	Award	Category	Recipient	Result
2015	Fajr International Film Festival	Best Actor	Mohsen Tanabandeh	Nominated
2015	Fajr International Film Festival	Best Makeup designer	Mahin Navidi	Won
2015	Fajr International Film Festival	Best Cinematography	Amir Hossein Asadi	Nominated
2015	Fajr International Film Festival	Best Set and Costume Design	Asghar Nejad Imani	Nominated
2015	Fajr International Film Festival	Best Sound (Recording)	Hassan Zahedi	Nominated
2015	Fajr International Film Festival	Best Sound (Sound Mix)	Mahmoud Mousavinejad	Nominated
