= Giti Pashaei =

- گیتی پاشایی
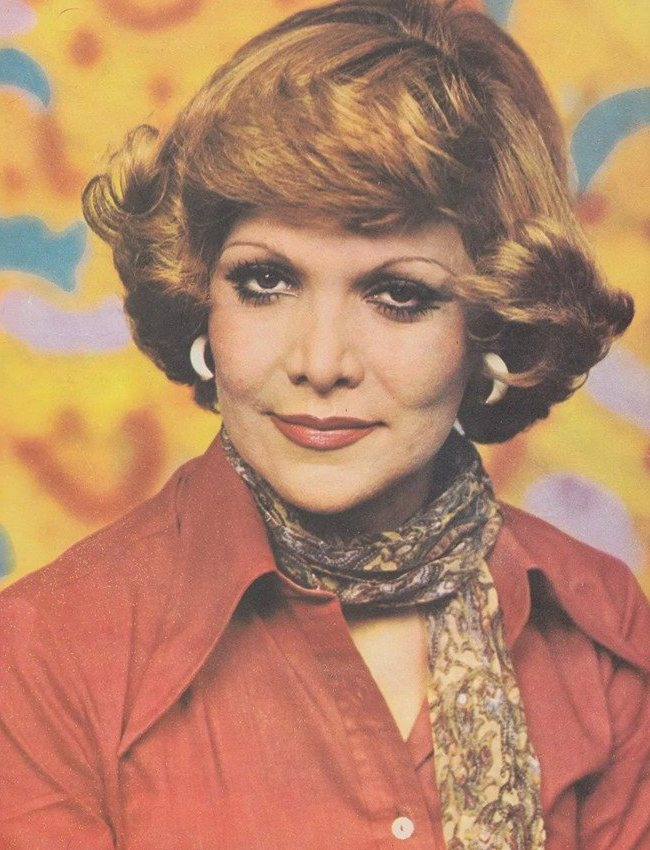
- Born: Giti Pashaei Tehrani; June 13, 1940; Tehran, Iran
- Died: May 7, 1995 (aged 54); Tehran, Iran
- Resting place: Behesht Zahra
- Education: Architecture
- Occupations: Singer, composer, actor
- Spouse: Masoud Kimiai (m. 1969; div. 1991)
- Children: Poulad Kimiayi
- Musical career
- Also known as: Giti Pashayi, Gity
- Origin: Tehran
- Genres: pop
- Label: Vinzomusic Ltd.

Giti Pashaei Tehrani (Persian: گیتی پاشایی تهرانی; sometimes spelt Giti Pashayi; June 13, 1940 – May 7, 1995) was an Iranian singer and musician. Pashaei was one of the most popular Iranian singers of the late 1960s and 1970s.

== Biography ==
Giti Pashaei was born on June 13, 1940, in Tehran, Iran. She inherited her passion for music from her grandfather, Jafar Mansoori, who was known as a poet and musician. Her early life was spent attending the master-classes of such musicians as Faramarz Payvar and Mehdi Forough. She continued her education in New York City, where she obtained a diploma in architecture and also studied orchestration and harmony and became a composer.

In 1979, Islamic Revolution put an end to her singing career. Women were forbidden to sing in public. Later on, she composed many soundtracks for Iranian movies after the revolution in 1979. As a composer, most of the time she worked with her husband Masoud Kimiai, a film director, whom she married in 1969.

== Personal life ==
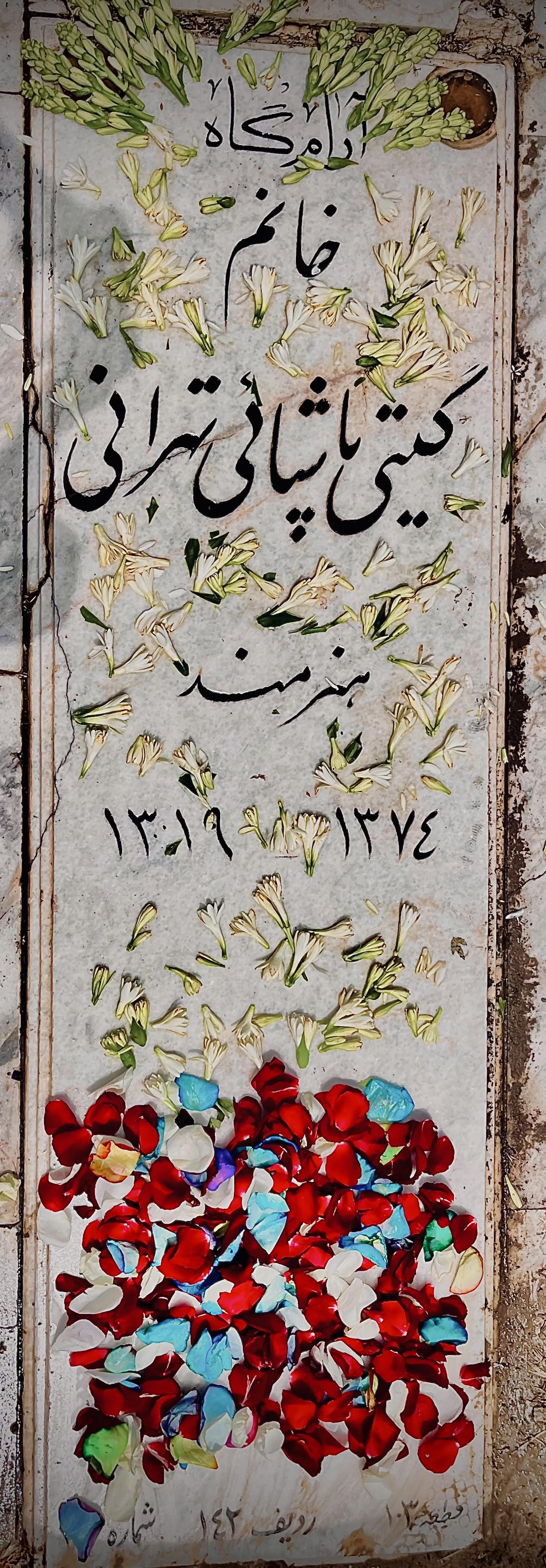
Gravestone of Giti Pashaee

Giti married to Masoud Kimiai, an Iranian film director, in 1969. In the late 1980s, she moved to Hamburg, Germany, where she researched Western Church and Baroque music. The couple separated in 1991, and have a son Poulad Kimiayi, a pianist, who was born on 14 July in 1980.

She died of breast cancer in Tehran on 7 May 1995. Her songs and compositions are still heard abroad.

== Works ==
=== Discography ===
- Miravam (1969)
- Ye Del Dāram (1969)
- Be Man Nakhand (1969)
- Nemikhām Dorough Begi (1969)
- Tasbih-e Sad-Douneh (1971)
- Gol-e Maryam (1971)
- Shādi Bā Man Ghahr-eh (1971)
- Rizeh-Rizeh (album, 1971)
- Ki Migeh Donyā Ghashang-eh (1972)
- Heyf-eh Harf-e Man-o Del Tamoum Besheh (1972)
- Mageh Man-o Khāb Bebini (1973)
- Ey Vāy Ey Vāy (1973)
- Ārezou-hā (1976)
- Ghorou-eh (1976)
- Khodā Mehraboun-eh (1976)

Memorable songs

- "Gol-e Maryam"
- "Mowlānā"
- "Shirin-Sokhan"
- "Bot-e Ayyār"
- "Lili Howzak"
- "Kaniz"

=== Compilation ===
- Arezooha (1995)
- Gole Maryam (1996)
- Rangarang: Pre-revolutionary Iranian Pop (2011, as co-artist)

=== Filmography ===
as actor

- Safar sang (The Journey of the Stone, 1978), as Fatemeh

as composer

- Blade and Silk (1986)
- Tigh o abrisham (1987)
- Sorb (The Lead, 1989), as Giti Pashayi
- The Snake Fang (1989)
- Goroohban (The Sergeant, 1991), as Giti Pashayi
