= Amir Hossein Arman =

Iranian actor and singer (born 1982)

- امیرحسین آرمان
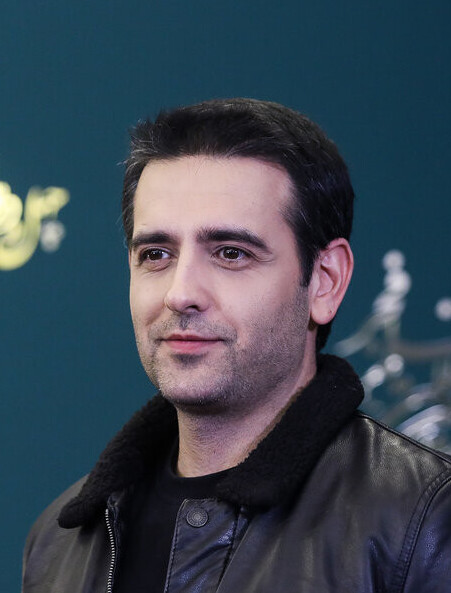
- Arman at the 2024 Fajr International Film Festival
- Born: November 5, 1982 (age 43); Tehran, Iran
- Occupations: Actor; singer
- Years active: 2004–present

Amir Hossein Arman (Persian: امیرحسین آرمان; born November 5, 1982) is an Iranian actor and singer.

== Career ==
He graduated in the field of interior decoration design. Amir Hossein Arman attended theater classes in Iran before embarking on his artistic career. He started his professional career with playing a role in the movie Marriage, Iranian Style directed by Hassan Fathi in 2004. He has performed as a singer in various productions.

Arman, also has acted in several TV series, such as Kimia and Paria; which made him more famous than before. In his acting career, Arman has main roles and complementary roles in different genres such as drama, romance, Mysterious crime and humor genre, which has proven to be a capable actor during his years of artistic activity. In 2021, Amirhossein Arman had the most different role in the "Red Square series", which appeared with a different face and style.

Amir Hossein loves nature and off-road trips. He travels when he has free time and prefers to be away from the city. He is an "honorary environmentalist".

== Endorsements ==
=== Advertising and modeling activities ===
In addition to acting, Amirhossein has collaborated with some brands in the field of modeling. After starring in the home media series "Mannequin", he was invited as a model for a menswear manufacturer. His advertising billboards had shown in the city streets moreover he starred T.V. teasers for that brand. Those teasers were broadcast on TV every day that year. His contract was for about a year, and after that, when he starred in the series "Red Square", he was selected as an advertising model for another brand, but second brand did not have T.V. teasers and all of collaborates was exclusively had shown in the medias of that brand.

Brand	Product	Year of cooperation
LC-MAN	Men's Clothes	2020
Huawei	Electronic and Digital products	2021

== Theater ==
Theater Name	Role	Director	Year of Product	Location
In the Neighborhood of the Tsars	-	Ahmad Soleimani	2025-2026	Iranshahr Theater
Koocheh Asheqi (Love Alley)	Iraj	Seyed Jalaledin Dori	2024	Sa'ad Abad Palace

== Filmography ==
=== Film ===
Film name	Role	Director	Year of Product
Paradise of Criminals(The Criminals Paradise)	Hasan Jafari	Masoud Jafari Jozani	2024
Asemane Qarb (The West Sky)	Hossein Adabian	Mohammad Asgari	2023
Bokharest(Bucharest)	Abed‌	Masoud Atyabi	2022
Anha mara doost dashtand (They Loved Me)	Pedram	Mohamadreza Rahmani	2022
Doshman-e-zan(Female enemy)	---‌	Karim Amini	2018
Nahang-e Anbar 2(Sperm Whale 2: Roya's Selection)	Sohail Tabrizian	Saman Moghadam	2017
AANHA (They)	AMIR	Ehsan Soltanian	2016
Shifte Shab (Night Shift)	Farid	Niki Karimi	2014
Khabar-e Khasi Nist(No News)	MohammadReza	Mostafa Shayesteh	2015
Dare sobh mishe(Morning is close)	Saman	Yalda Jebeli	2015
Nazanin	Mansour	Mahdi Golestaneh	2013
Besharat be yek shahrvande hezareye sevom(Annunciation to a Third Millennium Citizen)	---	Mohammad Hadi Karimi	2012
Sakene Khaneye Choubi(The Resident of the Wooden House)	---	Hossein Ali Layalestani	2012
Yek Habbeh Ghand(A Cube of Sugar)	Ghasem	Reza Mirkarimi	2011
Dobareh ba ham (Together again)	Saied	Roozbeh Heidari	2011
Man madar Hastam(I am a Mother)	Pedram	Fereydoun Jeyrani	2010
Barf Rooye Shirvani Dagh(Snow on a Hot Tin Roof)	Mahan	MohammadHadi Karimi	2011
Dar Emtedade shahr(Along City)	Hamed	Ali Atshani	2010
Bidariye Royaha(The Awakening of the Dreams)	Hamid	Mohammad Ali Bashe Ahangar	2009
Emshab shabe Mahtabe(Tonight There's Moonlight)	Yusef	Mohammad Hadi Karimi	2008
Sad sal be in salha(Hundred Years Better of These Years)	Arash	Saman Moghadam	2007
Hadafe Asli (Main Target)	Saman	Ghodratollah Solh Mirzaie	2006
Online Murder	Ramin	Masoud Abparvar	2005
Ezdevaj be sabke Irani (Marriage, Iranian Style)	Amirhossein	Hassan Fathi	2004

=== Web ===
Name	Role	Director	Year of Product
Hezartoo (Labyrinth)	Ahmadreza Okhovat	Seyed Ali Hashemi	2024
Tasian	Ahmadreza Ahmadi	Tina Pakravan	2025
Meydan-e-Sorkh (Red Square)	Saed Papireh	Ebrahim Ebrahimian	2021
Mankan (Mannequin)	Kaveh Sofian	Hossein Soheili Zadeh	2019
Mamnooe(Forbidden)	Barbod Arman	Amir Pourkian	2018
13 shomali(13 Northerners)	Amirhossein Arman	Alireza Amini	2017

=== Television ===
Film name	Role	Director	Year of Product
Kolah Pahlavi (Pahlavi hat)	Amir Tavakoli	Ziaodin Dorri	2013–2014
Sarzamine Madari (Homeland)	Mola Reza	Kamal Tabrizi	2014
Peyda va Penhan(Obvious & Hidden)	Saleh	Arash Mo'ayerian	2014
Zakhm (Wound)	Maziar	Masoud Abparvar	2015
Kimia	Shahryar Kamfar	Javad Afshar	2016
Paria	Keyvan Ranjbar	Hossein Soheilizadeh	2017
Marze Khoshbakhti (Border of Happiness)	Amir Movahed	Hossein Soheilizadeh	2018

== Discography ==
Amir Hossein Arman
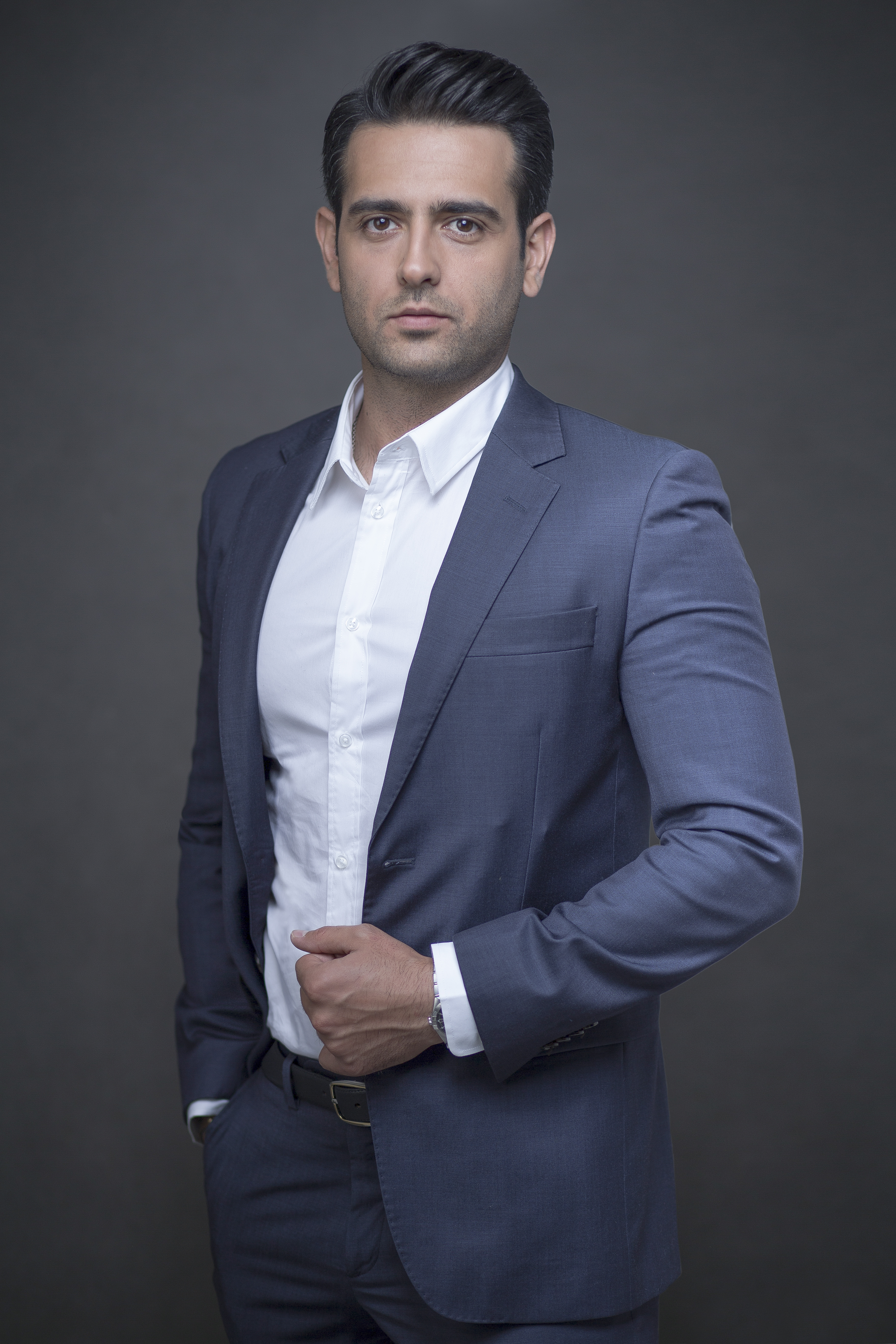

Amirhossein started singing professionally with the song "Towards you" that released in 2013.

The first Live singing took place on September 19, 2016, in Celebration of Cinema critics. He also performed on 3stars TV in March 2017 and on plus1 TV in December 2017. On December 23, 2017he sang live "Dele Divaneh" during playback of "The Yalda night" in Kourosh cinema.

Song
Towards you (Be souye to)
Like a dream (Mesle ye khab)
Desirable (Khastani)
Fire (Atash)
Every night (Har shab)
Trick (Tarfand)
Ta to negam mikoni (When you look at me)
Vaghti ke ba mani (When you are beside me)

== Awards and nominations ==
Nominated for Best pop track (for Khastani/desirable song) in fourth annual celebration Musicema Awards	2017
Nominated for best Actor (for Keivan role in "Paria" tvseries) in Hafez festival	2017
Nominated for best Actor (for Keivan role in "Paria" tvseries) in S Like Series TV program	2017
Nominated for best Actor (for Kaveh Soufian role in "Mankan" Home Media series) in 20th Hafez festival	2020
