= Mir-Taher Mazloomi =

Iranian actor

- میرطاهر مظلومی
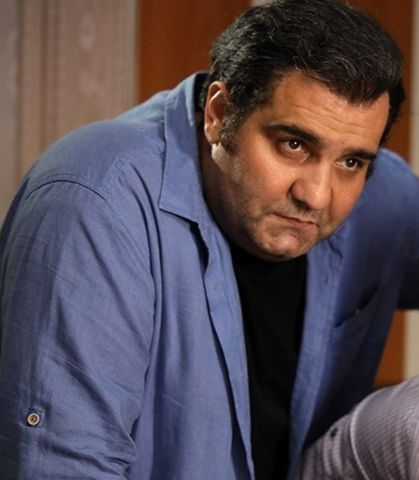
- Mir-Taher Mazloomi behind the scenes of the movie Two Brides – December 2014
- Born: 26 February 1975 (age 51); Tehran, Iran
- Education: University of Tehran
- Occupations: Actor, voice actor
- Years active: 1993–present

Mir Taher Mazloomi (Persian: میرطاهر مظلومی; born 26 February 1975, in Tehran) is an Iranian actor and voice actor.

== Biography ==
He is a theater graduate and started his artistic activity by participating in the classes of Professor Saarigian.

Mirtaher Mazloumi went to the theater stage for the first time in 1988, and then in 1999, he entered television with the series of so-and-so stories. After that, he entered the cinema in 2001 with the movie Saghi.

In addition to acting, Mazloumi is also active in dubbing and has spoken for different characters in many movies. Among his most important works are Gol Mehraboni's works, Oh Fish and Pond, X Large, Samurai in Berlin, Dynamite, Confiscation, Controversy at the Wedding, Two Brides, Nim, Iran Burger, The Season of Puberty, The Sound That Remains, Dismissals, Carnival He mentioned death, when we are all asleep, and the series of nurses, we will relax, Kimia, Rekhneh, Boi Baran, Samdan, Ta Soraya, The 30th Day, The Sheriff, and Rozgar Gharib.

== Filmography ==
- Joker (Iranian TV series) 2021
- Gasht-e ershad 3 2021
- Fish and Puddle 2020
- Cats city 2 2020
- Women Are Angels 2 2020
- Mafia Nights 2020
- Noon Khe (TV Series)
- The Monster (TV series) 2019
- Azhdar 2019
- Salhaye Door Az Khane (TV Series)
- The Monster (TV Series)
- The Samurai in Berlin 2018
- X-Large 2018
- Iran Burger 2015
- Hussein Who Said No 2014
- Guidance Patrol 2012
- Bitter Coffee 2010
- Ekhrajiha 2 2009
- Roozegar-e Gharib 2007
- Zero Degree Turn 2007
- In the Name of the Father 2006
- Nargess (TV series) 2006
- Confiscation
- I Love you
- Jenabe Ali
- Khod Khaaste

== Voice acting ==
- Pirates of the Caribbean: Dead Man's Chest as Davy Jones
- Deadly germs
- Just one breath
- Son
- Dr. Stockman and Oroko Saki in the cartoon Teenage Mutant Ninja Turtles (2008)
- The last accidental hero (2008)
- Forgotten (2009)
- Criminal (2010)
- Lost in Space (2010)
- Batman: Under the Red Hood as Joker
- Trickster (2010)
- First class porter (2010)
- Alternative killers (2010)
- Rig Roan
- The Key of Secrets
- The Legend of Zoro
- Hemat
- Tax collectors
- Let's go brother
- My children
- Felicia's trip
- Promise
- Heavenly and Earthly Warriors
- Another kind of loyalty
- El Dorado
- Titanic
- Bobby
- Man in front
- Harry Potter and the Half-Blood Prince as Albus Dumbledore
- Once upon a time in America (2011)
- Painful memories
- Child (2011)
- Rented Heart
- Man against man (2012)
- Arsenic and old tour (2012)
- The Mayor's Last Efforts (2008)
- The last hurray (2012)
- Man's best friend (2008)

== Awards ==
- Fadjr International Theater Festival Award for Best Actor – Radio Plays Competition
