= Paradise of Criminals =

- Persian: بهشت تبهکاران
- Directed by: Masoud Jafari Jozani
- Written by: Masoud Jafari Jozani
- Produced by: Fathollah Jafari Jozani; Ali Ghaemmaghami
- Starring: Amir Hossein Arman; Ladan Mostofi; Sahar Jafari Jozani; Hamid Goodarzi; Reza Yazdani; Pejman Bazeghi; Hooman Barghnavard; Behnam Tashakkor; Reza Shafiei-Jam; Hesam Manzour
- Cinematography: Amir Karimi
- Edited by: Mehdi Hosseinivand
- Music by: Fardin Khalatbari
- Production company: Jozan Film
- Release date: 1 February 2024; Fajr Film Festival
- Country: Iran
- Language: Persian

Paradise of Criminals (Persian: بهشت تبهکاران, romanized: Behesht-e Tabahkaran) is a 2024 Iranian Crime, drama film written and directed by Masoud Jafari Jozani.

== Plot ==
In 1950, Hassan Jafari (Amir Hossein Arman), an employee of the British Oil Company, was accused of murdering Ahmad Dehghan, the owner of the Tehran Muswar newspaper and the owner of the Nasr Theater (Tehran Theater).

== Margins ==
Masoud Jafari Jozani said angrily at the Fajr Film Festival press conference: "It was unprofessional that this version was released like this. It is very strange that we make everything we want to do secure, What happened to this film is not something we can justify, and it wasn't just an insult to us, it was an insult to people as well,They made a big mistake by releasing the film I gave them for review to the public".

Producer Ali Ghaem Maghami said in a press conference: "The film Paradise of Criminals was a heavy project in terms of production and technical issues, A few days before the start of the Fajr Film Festival, I talked to the festival directors about giving us two days to deliver the final version, but they refused and they said the law is the same for everyone and the ticket sales have been done, The version of our film that was shown on the first day of the festival was incomplete. It was a version that was submitted for review by the festival selection committee! Without music and sound mix, with a green screen! I wish it wasn't released like this and people would see the full film".

== Cast ==
- Amir Hossein Arman
- Ladan Mostofi
- Sahar Jafari Jozani
- Hamid Goodarzi
- Reza Yazdani
- Pejman Bazeghi
- Hooman Barghnavard
- Behnam Tashakkor
- Reza Shafiei-Jam
- Hesam Manzour
- Fariba Motekhasses
- Afsaneh Bayegan
- Fakhreddin Seddigh Sharif
- Farhad Ghaemian
- Esmaeel Khalaj
- Alireza Jalali-tabar

== Awards ==
| Year | Award | Category | Recipient | Result |
|---|---|---|---|---|
| 2024 | Fajr International Film Festival | Best Supporting Actor | Reza Yazdani | Nominated |
| 2024 | Fajr International Film Festival | Best Supporting Actress | Ladan Mostofi | Nominated |
| 2024 | Fajr International Film Festival | Best Director | Masoud Jafari Jozani | Nominated |
| 2024 | Fajr International Film Festival | Best Makeup designer | Mahin Navidi | Nominated |
| 2024 | Fajr International Film Festival | Best Field Special Effects | Arash Aghabeyg | Nominated |
| 2024 | Fajr International Film Festival | Best Costume Design | Asghar Nejad Imani | Nominated |
| 2024 | Fajr International Film Festival | Best Cinematography | Amir Karimi | Nominated |
