= Mazloomi =

Mazloomi is a surname of Iranian origins. People with this name include:

- Carolyn L. Mazloomi (born 1948), American curator, quilter, author, art historian, and aerospace engineer
- Gholamhussein Mazloomi (1950–2014), Iranian football player, coach, and administrator
- Mir Taher Mazloomi (born 1975), Iranian actor
- Parviz Mazloomi (born 1954), Iranian football player and coach
