= Negar Foroozandeh =

Iranian Public Figure actress

Negar Forouzandeh
- نگار فروزنده
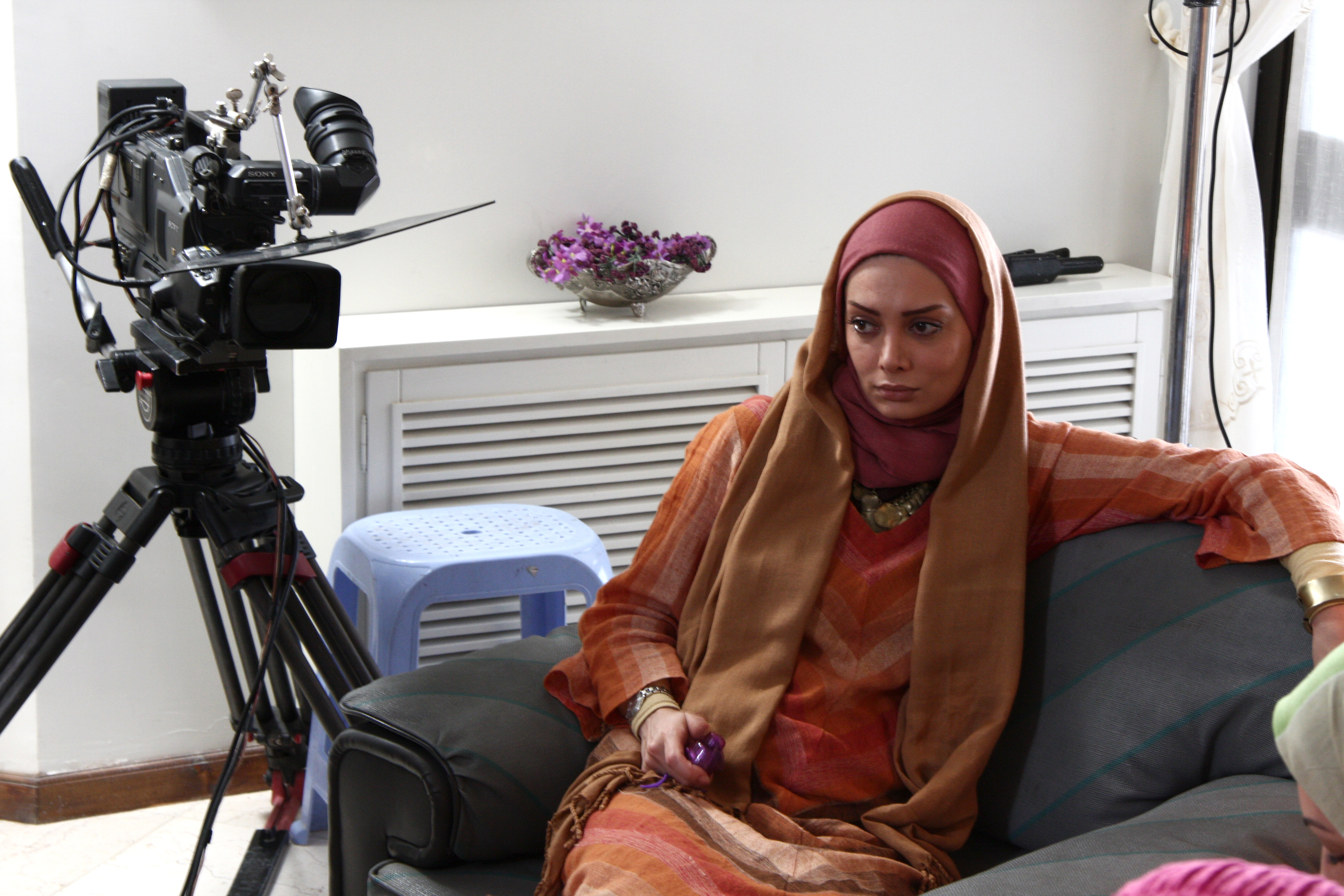
- Negar Forouzandeh at back stage of Bail Film 2008
- Born: June 24, 1978 (age 47); Tehran, Iran
- Other name: Negar Forouzandeh
- Occupation: Actress
- Years active: 1995 - present

Negar Forouzandeh (Persian: نگار فروزنده; born 24 June 1978 in Tehran) is an Iranian actress.

== Career ==
Among her many films are Ekhrajiha and Dayere Zangi. She has worked with many famous Iranian directors such as Dariush Mehrjui, Masoud Kimiai, Ebrahim Hatamikia and Parisa Bakhtavar. Negar Forouzandeh was trained by Hamid Samandarian before entering the film industry.

She has appeared in a number of series, including ‘Detective Alavi’ (1996), ‘Tiptoe’ (2002), ‘I'm a Tenant’ (2004), ‘Reyhaneh’ (2005), ‘The Rich and the Poor’ (2010) and ‘The Decius City’ (2011).

She has also played in several movies such as ‘Hidden Games’ (1995), ‘Mix’ (1999), ‘Café Setare’ (2004), ‘The Outcasts 1’ (2006), ‘Cry Out Loud’ (2006), ‘Tambourine’ (2007), ‘The Outcasts 2’ (2008), ‘Invitation’ (2008), ‘The First Condition’ (2009) and ‘The Outcasts 3’ (2010).

== Filmography ==
- Rich and Poor (TV series)
- Deportees 3 (Ekhrajiha 3)
- Deportees 2 (Ekhrajiha 2)
- Deportees (Ekhrajiha)
- First Condition (Sharte Aval)
- Trial on the Street (Mohakemeh Dar Khiaban)
- Tambourine (Dayereh-e zangi)
- Cafe Setareh
- Da'vat Be Sham
- Bazi-ye Penhan
- Afsongar
- Davat
- Boland Gerye Kon
- Papital
- Masoom (1998)
