= Niusha =

Niusha (Persian: نیوشا) is a feminine given name of Persian origin. Notable people with the name include:

- Niusha Mancilla (born 1971), Bolivian runner
- Niusha Zeighami (born 1980), Iranian actress, model, and makeup artist
