= Mehdi Forough =

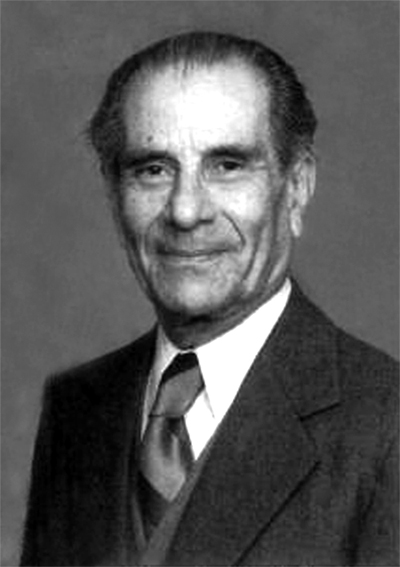
Mehdi Forough, ca. 1990

Mehdi Forough (Persian: مهدی فروغ; b. 1911– d. 2008) was an Iranian scholar, author, dramatist, writer on dramatic arts and culture, translator, and founder of the Academy of Dramatic Arts in Tehran. A native of Esfahan, Mehdi attended Sara-ye Ali in Tehran and went on to study at the Royal Academy of Dramatic Arts, London. He did graduate studies at Columbia University, NYC, where he completed his thesis, Comparative study of Abraham's sacrifice in Persian passion plays and Western mystery plays, 1954. This work was later published by the Ministry of Culture, in Tehran.

Upon his return to his native land he founded the Academy of Dramatic Arts at which he was the director, a teacher and a mentor to many notable actors, film directors, playwrights, and theater producers who continue his legacy around the world. He wrote for the journal Sokhan and authored numerous articles for many other publications. Amongst his books are a treatise on music, titled She'r va Musighi (Poetry and Music, 1957), Nofooz e elmi va elm-e-musighi-e Iran dar keshvar hay-e digar (The Scientific and Cultural Influence of Persian Music in other Countries), and Shahnameh va Adabiat-e-Dramatic (Shahnameh and the Dramatic Literature). In the late nineteen seventies he was the president of Bonyad-e-Shahnameh, an institution devoted to the preservation of the authenticity of Ferdowsi's epic poem.

He is also known for his excellent translations of English texts into Persian. Amongst his many translations of plays are Tennessee Williams' Glass Menagerie and August Strindberg's The Father both of which he staged and directed. Furthermore, he translated Henrik Ibsen's plays, A Doll's House and Ghosts. Another translation related to the Theater is Lajos Egri's The Art of Dramatic Writing. He also translated Aaron Copland's What to Listen for in Music, and Men of Music by Wallace Brockway and Herbert Weinstock. Mehdi Forough, is said to have possessed a legendary voice, although he never performed publicly. He is the composer of a song cycle in which he set well-known Persian poems of Hafez, Saadi, and others to music.

Mehdi Forough was married to Fakhri Dowlatabadi, one of the Iranian women pioneers in playing and teaching of western classical music and the daughter of Haji Mirza Yahya Dowlatabadi, who was the son of Subh-i-Azal and a prominent Constitutionalist of the 1906 Revolution and one of the founders of the modern school systems in Iran. Mehdi Forough's son is the violinist and professor, Cyrus Forough.
