= Maroufi =

Maroufi is a surname. Notable people with the surname include:

== People ==
- Abbas Maroufi (1957–2022), Iranian novelist and journalist
- Ibrahim Maaroufi (born 1989), Moroccan football player
- Javad Maroufi (1912–1993), Iranian musical artist

== Fictional characters ==
- Reza Maroufi, main character in the Iranian film The Command (2005 film)
