= Maryam Soltani =

Iranian actress (born 1977)

- مریم سلطانی
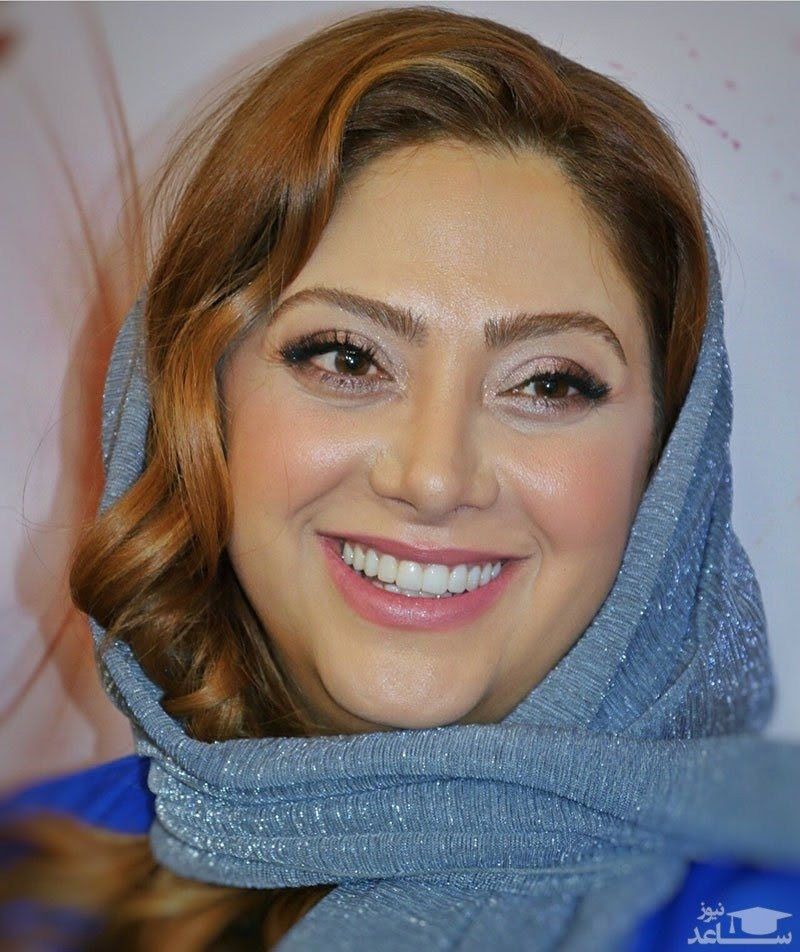
- Born: 26 January 1977 (age 49); Tehran, Iran
- Occupation: Actress
- Years active: 1999–present
- Website: Instagram of Maryam Soltani

Maryam Soltani (Persian: مریم سلطانی; born in 1977) is an Iranian actress.

== Background ==
Maryam Soltani was born in Tehran. She is a graduate of Hamid Samandarian acting academy. In 2000, she had her first acting experience in the film "Entezar".

== Selected filmography ==
- Ba Khaneman (2020)
- Matador (2013)
- Dokhtare Shahe Parion (2011)
- The Redemption TV series (2010)
- Rich and Poor (TV series) (2010)
- Ekhrajiha 3 (2010)
- Se Dar Chahar (2008)
- Roozegar-e Gharib (2007)
- Walking Tall (2005)
- Kalantar (2003)
- Yeki Mesl Man (2003)
