= The Soil (film) =

- Directed by: Masud Kimiai
- Written by: Masud Kimiai; Mahmoud Dowlatabadi
- Release date: 1973
- Country: Iran
- Language: Persian

The Soil (Persian: خاک "Khāk" pr "Khak") is a 1973 Iranian film by Masud Kimiai from the novel by Mahmoud Dowlatabadi. The film stars Behrouz Vossoughi, Farzaneh Taidi, and Faramarz Gharibian.
