= Sahar Jafari Jozani =

Iranian-American actress and Writer

- سحر جعفری جوزانی
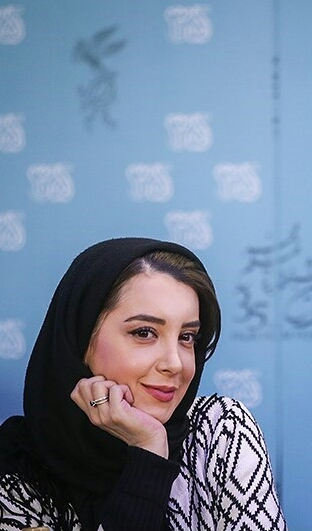
- Sahar Jafari Jozani in January 2017
- Born: July 2, 1978 (age 48); San Francisco, California, U.S.
- Occupations: Actress; Writer
- Years active: 1986–present
- Father: Masoud Jafari Jozani

Sahar Jafari Jozani (Persian: سحر جعفری جوزانی, born July 2, 1978) is an Iranian-American TV and cinema actress and writer. She is the daughter of Iranian director, Masoud Jafari Jozani.

== Life ==
Sahar Jafari Jozani lived in the United States until the age of 5 and then moved to Iran. Due to the separation of her parents, she was raised by her grandmother. She holds a degree in child psychology from Islamic Azad University.

Sahar began her professional career in the arts by acting in her father’s film Shir-e Sangi (The Stone Lion) in 1986. She later worked as both a writer and actress in the television series Doosti Agency (Friendship Agency) and was nominated for the Crystal Simorgh award for Best Supporting Actress at the Fajr Film Festival in 1999 for her role in the movie Balogh (Maturity).

Sahar Jafari Jozani gained more fame by acting in works by Mehran Modiri, including Noghte Chin (Dotted Line) in 2003 and Bagh-e Mozaffar (Mozaffar's Garden) in 2006.

Among her other works, Sahar appeared in the television series Dar Cheshm-e Baad (In the Eye of the Wind) as the character Iran, and in the popular series Ghahve-ye Talkh (Bitter Coffee). She also starred in the feature film Iran Burger.

== Filmography ==
=== Television ===
- Friendship Agency
- Sponsor
- The Dots (TV series)
- Anger and Reconciliation
- Dar Chashm-e Baad
- Mozaffar's Garden
- Faza Navardan
- Man of Many Many Faces
- All My Children
- Laughter Bomb
- Bitter Coffee
- Amnesia
- Mozaffar's Treasure

=== Cinema ===
- Stone Lion
- A man, A Bear
- Adolescence
- Her Eyes
- Seven Songs
- invitation (2008 film)
- Iran Burger
- Behind the Wall of Silence
- Paradise of Criminals
