= Cyrus Forough =

Persian-American concert violinist and professor

Cyrus Forough (Persian: سیروس فروغ) née Ali Forough (Persian: علی فروغ), is a Persian-American concert violinist and professor.

Forough was born in Tehran and began violin studies at age five with his mother, a graduate of the Brussels Royal Conservatory of Music. At nine, Forough was the youngest ever to be admitted to the Royal Conservatory of Music, Brussels as a pupil of Arthur Grumiaux. Later studies were with David Oistrakh at the Moscow Conservatory. Following Oistrakh's death, Forough came to the United States to study with Josef Gingold at Indiana University and served as Gingold's assistant.

Cyrus Forough is a laureate of the Tchaikovsky International Competition and first prizewinner of the Milwaukee Symphony Violin Competition. He was also a finalist in the Munich International Competition. Forough has appeared in recital and as soloist with orchestras internationally. Forough is a professor of violin and chamber music at Carnegie Mellon University, Pittsburgh, PA.

Winner of the USIA's National violin/piano Duo Competition with his wife, pianist Carolyn McCracken, Forough represented the United States as an Artistic Ambassador under the auspices of the US State Department. Forough has concertized and given master classes in Asia and South America. He has also conducted master classes at the Cleveland Institute of Music, Chateau de Champs in Paris, Oberlin Conservatory of Music, and the Toronto Royal Conservatory of Music's Glenn Gould program, among others.

Cyrus Forough is the son of Mehdi Forough, an Iranian scholar, author, dramatist, writer who founded the Academy of Dramatic Arts in Tehran, and Fakhri Dowlatabadi, one of the Iranian women pioneers in playing and teaching of western classical music and the daughter of Haji Mirza Yahya Dowlatabadi, who was the son of Subh-i-Azal, and a prominent Constitutionalist of the 1906 Persian Constitutional Revolution and one of the founders of the modern school systems in Persia/Iran.

== Discography ==
- VI Tchaikovsky International Competition. Violin (1978)
- Sonata Electronica; Works by Alireza Mashayekhi (2019)
