= Niusha Zeighami =

Iranian actress

- نیوشا ضیغمی
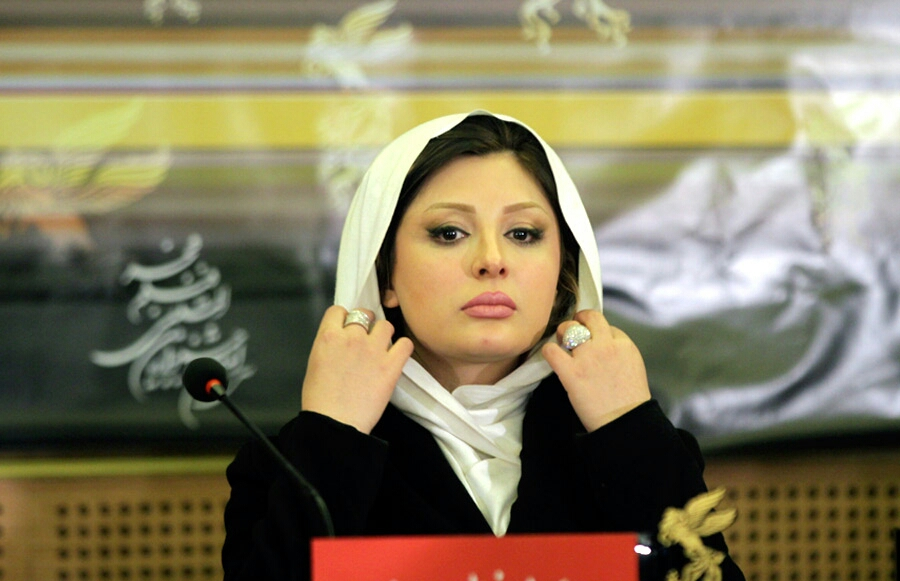
- Born: July 9, 1980 (age 46); Tehran, Iran
- Occupation: Actress
- Years active: 2003 - present
- Spouse: Arash Pouladkhan (m. 2010–2021)

Niusha Zeighami (Persian: نیوشا ضیغمی; born July 9, 1980) is an Iranian actress. She has received various accolades, including nominations for two Crystal Simorgh and a Hafez Award.

== Career ==
She also acted in the series ‘Tell the Truth’ (2012).

Zeyghami has appeared in several movies, including ‘The Juggler’ (2004), ‘The Confrontation’ (2004), ‘My Sin’ (2006), ‘Hidden Feeling’ (2006), ‘Parkway’ (2006), ‘The Outcasts’ (2006), ‘Forced Blessing’ (2007), ‘The Outcasts 2’ (2008), ‘Extreme Cold’ (2009), ‘Mirror and Candlestick’ (2012) and ‘Iran Burger’ (2014).

== Filmography ==
- 2015 Iran Burger
- 2012 Room Number Zero as Sara
- 2012 Guidance Patrol as Parisa
- 2011 Porteghal khooni
- 2011 The Swallows in Love
- 2010 Dokhtare Shahe Parion
- 2009-2010 Dar Chashm-e Baad
- 2009 Ekhrajiha 2 as Narges
- 2009 Democracy Tou Rouze Roshan as Fatemeh
- 2008 Movajehe
- 2008 Shirin
- 2008 Tofigh-e Ejbari as Simin
- 2007 Ekhrajiha as Narges
- 2007 Hess-e Penhan
- 2007 Parkway as Raha's Friend
- 2006 Gonah-e man
- 2006 Shoorideh
