= Dar Chashm-e Baad =

- Also known as: In the Eye of the Wind
- Genre: Historical; Romantic
- Written by: Masoud Jafari Jozani
- Directed by: Masoud Jafari Jozani
- Starring: Parsa Pirouzfar; Akbar Abdi; Kambiz Dirbaz; Setareh Safarave; Jahangir Almasi; Mohammad-Reza Hedayati; Sam Derakhshani; Saeed Nikpour; Sahar Jafari Jozani; Laleh Eskandari; Mahmoud Pakniyat; Angel Rhoades
- Country of origin: Iran
- No. of episodes: 52

Production
- Production locations: Iran; United States
- Running time: 45 minutes (including commercials)
- Production company: IRIB

Original release
- Network: IRIB TV1
- Release: 26 June 2009 – June 18, 2010

In the Eye of the Wind in Persian Dar Chashm-e Bād (Persian: در چشم باد) is an Iranian historical television series directed by Masoud Jafari Jozani.

== Plot ==
The series narrates the Iranian history in a 60-year period from the Jungle Movement to the Iranian revolution and the Iran–Iraq War. In the Eye of the Wind spans the period of history between the revolutionary movement begun by Iran's national hero Mirza Kuchik Khan in the early twentieth century, to the liberation of Khorramshahr during the eight-year war between Iran and Iraq in the 1980s. The story is told through the trials and tribulations, love and relationships, of one family.

== Production ==
The television series "In the Eyes of the Wind" produced by Reza Ansarian and started with the production of "Mahmoud Khosravi" and "Sayyed Jalal Niabi" was replaced by "Habibollah Kase Saz" a few months later. After five years of production, it was given to Massoud Jafari Juzani and Abbas Akbari.

The whole work takes about 5 minutes, about half of which was filmed at the time of Ansari's production and bowl making, and the other 2% was filmed at Jovani and Akbari. Alireza Zarrin Dast started filming the series, but he left the band late last year, and Hassan Pooya replaced him as film director for a month, after which he was transferred to Amir Karimi where he worked till the end. Reconstruction of the streets of Taleghani, Lalezar, and Pamenar was reconstructed to capture the sequences of years 1 and 2, and the reconstruction of the Khorramshahr Mosque took about six months to complete in the main mosque itself. Ghazali Cinema City was the main location of Phase Two of the series.

The third phase of the series related to the Iran-Iraq War was filmed in the Sacred Defense Cinema around Tehran and in Khorramshahr city in year 1–5. In this phase, the designer was Saeed Malekan, Costume Designer: Majid Mirfarkharai, Assistant Director: Ahmad Ramazanzadeh and Director of War Production: Seyed Ali Ghaemmaghami.

The director of the project planning and planning team and the first assistant director is Reza Jafari Jozani.

== Music ==
Hossein Alizadeh has made the music for the series.

== Cast ==
- Parsa Pirouzfar as Bijan
- Setareh Safarave as Leily
- Akbar Abdi as "Hassan Agha"
- Kambiz Dirbaz as Nader
- Angel Rhoades as Holly
- Aysa Aghchay as Aysa
- Brad Potts as Dexter
- Michael Beardsley as Ray Smith
- Abigail McConnell as Nurse
- Jahangir Almasi as "Colonel"
- Laleh Eskandari as Fakhrosadat
- Mohammad-Reza Hedayati as Mahmoud Dezhgir
- Sam Derakhshani
- Saeed Nikpour as Mirza Hassan Irani
- Saeed Rad as Reza Shah
- Mahmoud Pakniyat
- Sahar Jafari Jozani
