= Rich and Poor (TV series) =

2010 Iranian television series

- Persian: دارا و ندار
- Genre: Drama; Comedy
- Written by: Peyman GhasemKhani; Khashayar Alvand; Pedram Karimi and Masoud Dehnamaki
- Directed by: Masoud Dehnamaki
- Starring: Fathali Oveisi; Sam Derakhshani; Reza Rooygari; Alireza Khamseh; Negar Foroozandeh; Marjaneh Golchin; Behnoosh Bakhtiari; Javad Hashemi; Maryam Kavyani; Shohreh Lorestani; Nafiseh Roshan; Maryam Soltani; Sahar Valadbeigi; Reza Tavakoli; Yousef Sayadi; Shahrzad Kamalzadeh; Shahab Abbasi
- Composer: Pirooz Arjmand
- Country of origin: Iran
- Original language: Persian
- No. of seasons: 1
- No. of episodes: 14

Production
- Producer: Seyed Amir Parvin Hosseini
- Production location: Tehran
- Cinematography: Amir Karimi
- Editor: Mohsen Tavakoli
- Running time: 40-55 minutes

Original release
- Release: 21 March – 4 April 2010

Rich and Poor (Persian: دارا و ندار) is an Iranian Drama and Comedy series. The series is directed by Masoud Dehnamaki.This series has been broadcast simultaneously on two channels, IRIB TV5 and Jame Jam.

== Storyline ==
Teymour Golchin is an old man, selfish and wealthy man who has sold all his property, invested in construction in Dubai and is going there forever. In Dubai, Teymour unexpectedly faces the effects of the global economic crisis and realizes that his Iranian partner has fled and...

== Cast ==
- Fathali Oveisi
- Sam Derakhshani
- Reza Rooygari
- Alireza Khamseh
- Negar Foroozandeh
- Marjaneh Golchin
- Behnoosh Bakhtiari
- Javad Hashemi
- Maryam Kavyani
- Shohreh Lorestani
- Nafiseh Roshan
- Maryam Soltani
- Sahar Valadbeigi
- Reza Tavakoli
- Yousef Sayadi
- Shahrzad Kamalzadeh
- Shahab Abbasi
- Reza Banafshekhah
- Yousef Teymouri
- Fatemeh Taheri
- Ramin Rastad
- Alireza Oveisi
- Abbas Mahboub
- Farhad Besharati
- Fariba Torkashovand
- Malakeh Ranjbar
- Saghi Zinati
- Behzad Rahimkhani
- Majid Shahriari
- Shahrbanoo Mousavi
- Ebrahim Bahralolomi
