= Frosty Roads =

Jadehay sard
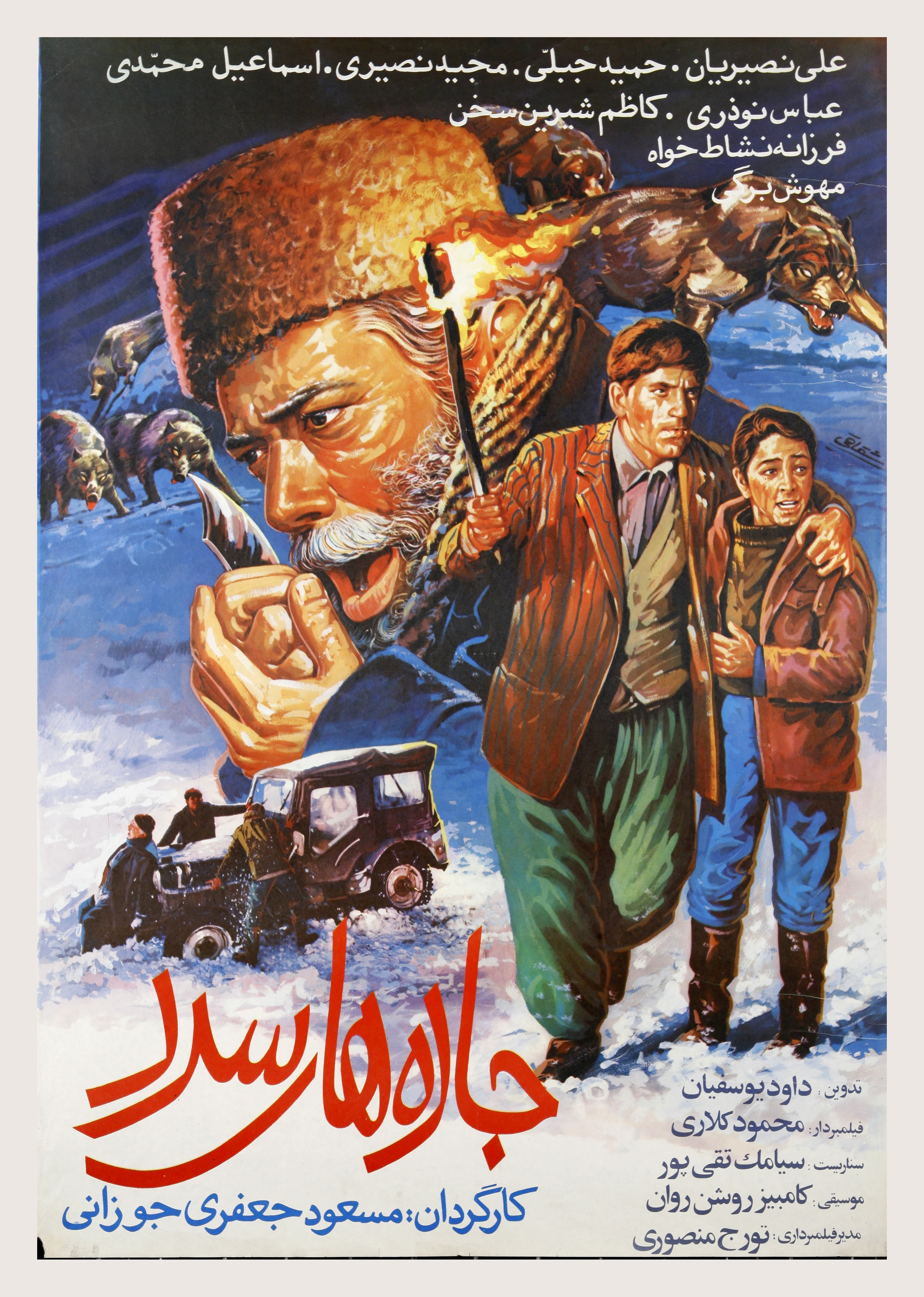
- Directed by: Massood Jafari Jozani
- Written by: Siamak Taghipour
- Based on: "If Daddy Dies" by Reza Sarshar
- Produced by: Siamak Taghipour
- Starring: Hamid Jebeli; Esmail Mohammadi; Ali Nassirian
- Cinematography: Mahmoud Kalari; Turaj Mansuri
- Edited by: Davoud Yusefian
- Music by: Kambiz Roshanravan
- Production company: Farabi Cinema Foundation
- Release date: 29 June 1986
- Running time: 93 minutes
- Country: Iran
- Language: Persian

Jadehay sard (Translation: Frosty Roads) is a 1985 Iranian film by Massood Jafari Jozani. The film is based on the story "If Daddy Dies" by Reza Sarshar. In 1987 it became one of the first Iranian films to receive international attention when it premiered at the 37th Berlin International Film Festival.

== Cast ==
- Ali Nassirian as Moosavi
- Hamid Jebeli as Rahman
- Majid Nasiri as Esmeil
- Esmail Mohammadi as Darvish Gorgali
- Farzaneh Neshat Akhavan as Moosavi's Wife

== Plot ==
Moosavi, a country schoolteacher, must undertake an arduous journey to fetch medicine for his village's sick. Accompanied by his student and a villager, he travels through a blizzard and is pursued by a pack of hungry wolves.

== Awards ==
- 1986 Golden Plate Award for Best Feature Film at the Fajr International Film Festival
