= Reverse (2019 film) =

- Film poster
- Persian: معکوس
- Directed by: Poulad Kimiayi
- Written by: Poulad Kimiayi
- Produced by: Masoud Kimiai
- Starring: Babak Hamidian; Shahram Haghighat Doost; Leila Zare; Parvaneh Massoumi; Ali Reza Kamali; Akbar Zanjanpour; Siavash Tahmoures
- Cinematography: Turaj Mansuri
- Edited by: Amir Adibparvar; Mostafa Kherghehpoosh
- Music by: Behzad Abdi
- Distributed by: Film Afarin
- Release date: 1 February 2019 (Fajr International Film Festival)
- Running time: 96 minutes
- Country: Iran
- Language: Persian

Reverse (Persian: معکوس) is a 2019 Iranian Crime-drama film written and directed by Poulad Kimiayi.

== Plot ==
Salar (Babak Hamidian) is a mobile Auto mechanic whose wife was recently killed in a car accident. His wife's family has complained to Salar and blamed Salar for the accident. They have demanded ransom from him and he has been in prison for a while because of this. After meeting his father's old friend, Reza Dardashti. Reza Dardashti tells him facts about his parents' past and offers him an illegal car race to make money.

== Cast ==
- Babak Hamidian
- Shahram Haghighat Doost
- Leila Zare
- Parvaneh Massoumi
- Ali Reza Kamali
- Akbar Zanjanpour
- Siavash Tahmoures
- Akbar Moazezi
- Houman Sedighi
