= Esmaeel Khalaj =

- اسماعیل خلج
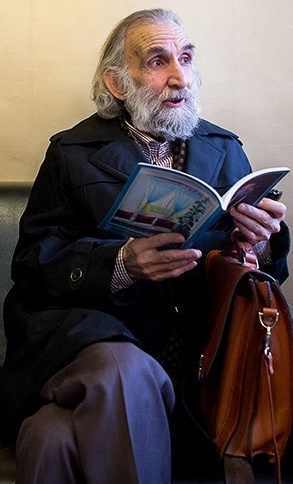
- Born: Tehran, Iran
- Occupation: Actor

Esmaeel Khalaj (born 1936, Persian: اسماعیل خلج) is an Iranian playwright and film and television writer, director and actor. He was born in Astara, but went to Tehran and studied acting under the Iranian acting teacher and director, Abdolhossein Nooshin. He started to write plays in the 1970s. In his plays, he has a very naturalistic worldview and bitter language. In fact, he is under the influence of European nineteenth-century realism and naturalism. Most places in his plays are coffeehouses and dirty places from downtown. His characters are prostitutes, pimps, thieves and illiterate people. These characters use a simple and sometimes rude language, but at the same time they think about very difficult problems like death and life.

== Some of his plays ==
- Hangout (1971)
- Pimp (1971)
- How are You Doing, Mash Rahim? (1971)
- Mrs. Goldooneh (1971)
- Friday Killing (1973)
- Obeid Zakani (1977)
- Shabat (1977)
- Iran Burger (2015)
- Paradise of Criminals (2024)
