= Ekhrajiha =

- Poster of Ekhrajiha
- Directed by: Masoud Dehnamaki
- Written by: Masoud Dehnamaki
- Produced by: Habibollah Kasehsaz
- Starring: Akbar Abdi; Amin Hayai; Mohamad Reza Sharifinia; Kambiz Dirbaz; Manoucher Azar; Fakhreddin Sedigh Sharif; Ali Osivand; Arzhang Amirfazli; Negar Forouzandeh; Mina Jafarzadeh; Niusha Zeighami; Shohreh Lorestani; Javad Hashemi; Abolfazl Hamrah; Ghasem Zare; Mahmoud Maghami; Abdolreza Akbari; Hossein Nagavi; Hadi Nagavi; Mahdi Nagavi; Hurie Moghadam
- Cinematography: Hassan Pouya
- Edited by: Reza Baharangiz
- Music by: Fereydoun Shahbazian; Singer:Mohammad Esfahani
- Distributed by: Filmiran
- Release date: March 7, 2007
- Running time: 104 min.
- Language: Persian

Ekhrajiha (Persian: اخراجی‌ها, Deportees) is a 2007 Iranian film, written and directed by Masoud Dehnamaki, narrating a story during Iran–Iraq War.

The film is Dehnamaki's first feature film, after he directed two documentaries about social problems in Iran.

The film had also broken all box-office records in Iran, earning nearly 1 billion toman only twenty-eight days after its release and finishing its run with over 2 billion toman. Additionally the film is one of few Iranian war movies in which the heroes are extremely flawed and shown to commit acts often viewed as "immoral" by authorities in Iran.

== Plot ==
The movie, set in 1988 begins when Majid (Kambiz Dirbaz), a local thug from Southern Tehran is released from prison along with his friend Amir (Arzhang Amirfazli). To avoid embarrassment, Majid and his friends have told his family and neighborhood that Majid is returning from Hajj at Mecca. Even though his lie is unveiled after some stupid mistakes by Amir and his other friend Bayram (Akbar Abdi).

Majid has been attempting to show that he is an honorable man so he can marry Narges (Niousha Zeyghami), the daughter of Mirza (Manouchehr Azar); a pious man in the neighborhood. Bayram on the other hand wants to marry Majid's sister Marzieh (Negar Forouzandeh). In order to impress Narges and her father, Majid decides he must go to the front and fight against the Iraqi Army.

Majid, Amir, Bayram, Mostafa (Alireza Osivand), Bijan (Amin Hayai) and a local musician sign up for the war and head off to training. Here they are met with opposition by Haj Saleh (Mohamad Reza Sharifinia) and Kamali (Ghasem Zareh), who question their faith as Majid and his friends don't pray, gamble, use foul language, smoke and use drugs. They are eventually kicked out of training but with the help of an acquaintance from the neighborhood named Morteza (Javad Hashemi) they are allowed to go back to training.

Morteza attempts to "reform" Majid and his friends as they go through the last days of the Iran–Iraq War.

== Awards and nominations ==
25th Fajr Film Festival

=== Wins ===
- Viewer's Choice for Best Film

=== Nominations ===
- Best Set & Costume Design
- Best Special Effects

== Cast ==
=== Main cast ===
- Akbar Abdi - Bayram
- Kambiz Dirbaz - Majid
- Mohamad Reza Sharifinia - Haj Saleh
- Amin Hayai - Bijan
- Arzhang Amirfazli - Amir
- Alireza Osivand - Mostafa

=== Supporting cast ===
- Manouchahr Azar - Mirza
- Javad Hashemi - Morteza
- Abolfazl Hamrah - Abbas
- Sepand Amirsoleimani - Doktor
- Ghasem Zareh - Kamali
- Negar Forouzandeh - Marzieh
- Niousha Zeyghami - Narges
- Mina Jafarzadeh - Majid's mother
- Fakhreddin Sedigh Sharif - Haj agha

== Response ==
The movie was not viewed positively by most Iranian critics, and was not awarded any major prizes from festivals. Ekhrajiha was released nationwide in Iran on March 7, 2007, and grossed 1 billion toman in its first 28 days on screen, finishing its nationwide release with a box office take of roughly 2 billion toman. This means the movie at the time was highest-grossing movie in Iranian cinema, surpassing Tahmineh Milani's Atash Bas. Tofighe Ejbari is currently the highest-grossing movie of all time in Iranian cinema, with Ekhrajiha in a close second.

Nearly one month after the release of the movie, high quality bootlegs of the movie were being sold in Iran, even though the movie was still playing in cinemas. Dehnamaki accused Hamshahri newspaper employees of being responsible for the release of the bootlegs.

== Sequel ==
Massoud Dehnamaki made two sequels for this film, Ekhrajiha 2 and Ekhrajiha 3 in 2009 and 2011.
