= Guidance Patrol (film) =

2012 Iranian film by Saeed Soheili

- Poster for home video
- Directed by: Saeed Soheili
- Written by: Mehdi Mirzaie; Saeed Soheili; Mehdi Mohammad-Nezhadiani
- Produced by: Saeed Soheili
- Starring: Hamid Farrokhnezhad; Saed Soheili; Poulad Kimiayi; Sahar Ghoreishi; Niusha Zeighami; Jamshid Hashempour
- Cinematography: Touraj Aslani
- Edited by: Kaveh Imani
- Music by: Naser
- Distributed by: Filmiran
- Release date: 15 March 2012 (Tehran)
- Running time: 100 minutes
- Country: Iran
- Language: Persian
- Box office: 1,533,642,000 Toman

Guidance Patrol (Persian: گشت ارشاد; Gasht-e Ershad) is a 2012 Iranian comedy film directed by Saeed Soheili. The movie depicts three urban working poor young men who impersonate crew of a Guidance Patrol (the morality police) to earn money. Dealing with a national issue and mocking the morality police, the movie soon sparked controversy in Iran and eventually was pulled from screens.

Ahmad Khatami called it "obscene" and "immoral" in Tehran's friday prayer speech. Ansar-e Hezbollah protested outside the Ministry of Culture and Islamic Guidance building and set a 48-hour deadline for suspending the screening of the movie. Islamic Propagation Organization's Art Center, one of main proprietors of movie theatres in Iran, refused to screen the movie in its all 62 cinemas in order to "observe its duties in the protection of social and ideological values" because the movie "targeted Islamic morality and family decency".

Though it was only able to screen in 15 movie theatres, it enjoyed a strong opening and became the box office number-one for Nowruz before getting banned after 31 days. Surpassed by Kolah Ghermezi and Bache Naneh and I Feel Sleepy, it became the third highest-grossing film screened in Iran in 1391 SH.

== Sequel ==
Saeed Soheili made two sequels for this movie, Guidance Patrol 2 and Guidance Patrol 3 in 2017 and 2020.

== Awards and nominations ==
Awards
Award	Year	Category	Recipients and nominees	Result
Fajr International Film Festival	2012	Crystal Simorgh - Best Lead Actor	Hamid Farrokhnezhad	Nominated
Fajr International Film Festival	2012	Crystal Simorgh - Best Supporting Actor	Saed Soheili	Nominated
Fajr International Film Festival	2012	Crystal Simorgh - Best Supporting Actor	Poulad Kimiai	Nominated
Fajr International Film Festival	2012	Honours Diploma - Best Score	Naser Cheshmazar	Won
Fajr International Film Festival	2012	Crystal Simorgh - Best Field Effects	Hamid Rasoulian	Nominated
