= Men of Music =

1939 text

- Author: Wallace Brockway and Harvey Weinstock
- Publisher: Simon and Schuster
- Publication date: 1939

Men of Music: Their Lives, Times and Achievements is a volume of mini-biographies and evaluations of famous classical music composers, written by Wallace Brockway and Herbert Weinstock, and originally published by Simon & Schuster in 1939. Revised and expanded editions appeared in 1950 and 1958, and the book has gone through seven printings, the most recent being a 1967 softcover edition.

The book gained a certain amount of fame because the authors were chosen by the publishing firm itself. They were chosen precisely because they were not professional music critics, and would therefore be able to avoid the highly technical jargon that layman readers might find on album liner notes, in publications, and today, on classical music websites.

Some of Brockway and Weinstock's opinions, however, were, and have always been, controversial, as noted by Time magazine in their 1939 review of the original edition. Among them are:

- the evaluation of Tchaikovsky as "the greatest symphonist of the nineteenth century after Beethoven" (bypassing Brahms, who is often given that honor by critics, but receives a less favorable evaluation in this book),
- of Franz Liszt as "the greatest musical failure of the nineteenth century",
- of the Ode to Joy in Beethoven's Ninth as a "cataclysmic anticlimax" (because of the difficulty involved in singing it well),
- of Beethoven's Missa Solemnis as also being impossible to perform because of the difficulty involved in singing it,
- of Beethoven's now well-loved Symphony No. 6, the Pastoral, as "plain dull" because it supposedly does not contain any of the stylistic "trademarks" that the composer was famous for,
- of Richard Strauss's now-acclaimed late work Metamorphosen as "a half-hour's non-entertainment for string orchestra" (1958 edition). "The fair thing is to treat Richard Strauss as a man who died in 1911".
- and finally, the charge that in the final two movements of his Symphony No. 3, "Brahms descends to real ugliness in his orchestration".

Men of Music also reflects the musical evaluations of the era in which it was published, as well as the authors' own prejudices. As examples, the only baroque composers covered are Bach and Handel; Antonio Vivaldi, who had not yet achieved the popularity that he enjoys now, is left out of the book, along with any mention of his best-loved work, The Four Seasons, which had not been recorded in 1939, and no mention of the work was added in later revisions of the book. The Nutcracker, which had not yet been performed complete in the United States in 1939, was barely mentioned in the original edition; only the twenty-minute Nutcracker Suite extracted from it was given anything resembling a detailed discussion, and Brockway and Weinstock did not change this in later revisions of the book. Gustav Mahler is also notably missing from the volume, as is Antonín Dvořák, composer of the enormously popular New World Symphony.

No American composers are covered in the book.

== Sources ==
- Brockway, Wallace and Herbert Weinstock Men of Music (Simon & Schuster, 1939, rev.ed, 1950)
- Outline of Musicians - TIME
- NYPL Digital Library Men of Music
