= Masoud Jafari Jozani =

Iranian filmmaker

- مسعود جعفری جوزانی
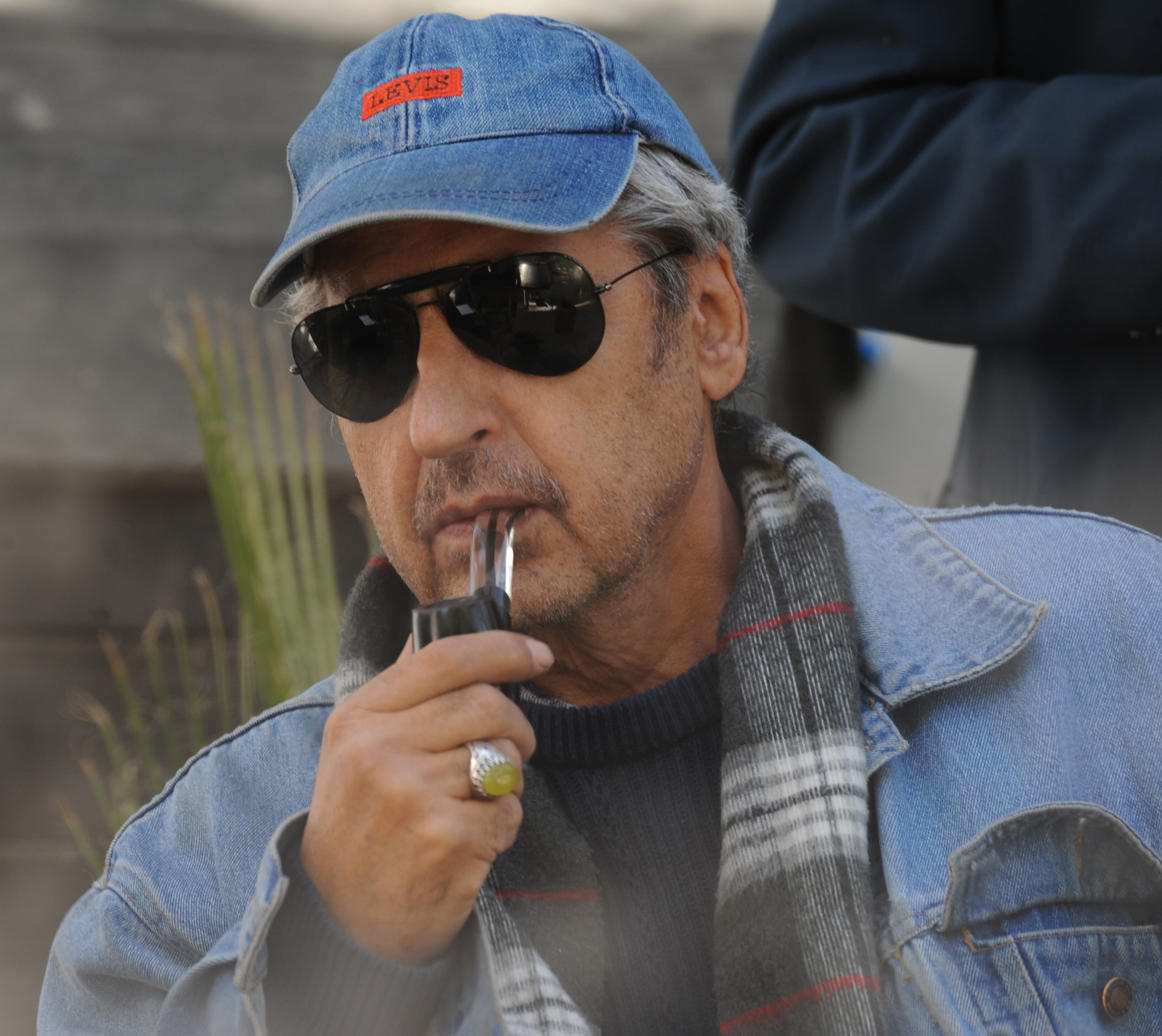
- Born: 9 December 1948 (age 77); Malayer, Pahlavi Iran
- Education: San Francisco State University
- Occupation: Filmmaker
- Years active: 1984–present
- Children: 3, including Sahar
- Awards: List of awards by Masoud Jafari Jozani

Masoud Jafari Jozani (Persian: مسعود جعفری جوزانی; Persian pronunciation: [mæsˈʔuːd dʒæfæˈɾiː dʒozɒːˈniː], born 9 December 1948) is an Iranian film director, screenwriter and producer. He has received an award for the best short film at the Fajr International Film Festival. In the Wind's Eye is one of Jafari Jozani's most notable works, which he directed and wrote. This TV series In the Wind's Eye was the first Iranian film to be shot in the United States since the Iranian Revolution (1979) and one of the most expensive films in the history of Iran, with a budget of $12 million.

Jozani, Iranian cinema's enduring face, is a post-revolutionary cinema pioneer who introduced Iranian post-revolutionary cinema to international festivals with his debut film, Frosty Roads. He was recognized as a bridge between East and West cinema in 1987 and 1988, when he attended many international film festivals, including the Berlin International Film Festival, the Montreal World Film Festival, the Hawaii International Film Festival, and the Hong Kong International Film Festival. Jozani teaching cinema and graphics in the United States (with a lifetime teaching license), teaching at Iranian universities, and managing the Jozan Film Institute.

== Early life and education ==
Masoud Jafari Jozani was born on 9 December 1948 in Malayer, Hamadan province, Pahlavi Iran.

Jozani received an M.A. degree in cinema from the San Francisco State University (1977). He began his cinematic career as a scriptwriter and director of short films.

== Career ==
=== 1980–1984: Entering television and animation ===
==== Towards Freedom (1980) ====
Towards Freedom by Jozani is considered the first political documentary in Iran, played on 10 February 1980 by the Islamic Republic of Iran Broadcasting. Jafari Jozani founded the IRIB's animation section and produced some animated films.

=== 1984: Beginning a cinematic career ===
==== Speak to Me (1984) ====
In 1984, Jozani, by making the short film Speak to Me, produced by the Institute for the Intellectual Development of Children and Young Adults, managed to get the honorary diploma for best short film from the third Fajr International Film Festival.

==== Frosty Roads (1984) ====
In 1984, Jafari Jozani made his debut feature film in his birthplace. Frosty Roads was one of the best-selling films of the first decade of the revolution, and it is valued for its visual structure as much as its substance. The only professional and well-known member of this film was Ali Nassirian. This film opened the path for Hamid Jebeli, Turaj Mansuri, Mahmoud Clari, Alireza Raisian, and Shapur Pouramin to break into the professional film industry.

==== The Stone Lion (1987) ====
The Stone Lion (Persian: شیر سنگی (فیلم), romanized: Shir Sangi), is the story of a confrontation between tradition and modernity, which won the Crystal Simorgh for Best Screenplay in the fifth Fajr International Film Festival. The killing of one British creates a deadly confrontation between two Bakhtiari leaders, starring Ezzatolah Entezami and Ali Nassirian, making it the most important and most important durable of Jozani's works. Also participated in many international festivals, such as the 11th Montreal World Film Festival (Canada) in 1988, and was appreciated.

==== Eye of the Hurricane (1989) ====
His next movie was Eye of the Hurricane, which had a larger production than The Stone Lion. It was again a documentary story about the presence of foreigners in Iran during World War II.

==== Maturity (1999) ====
After the cultural developments of 1992–2002, he attended to the youth's problems by making the film Maturity and received awards in the 18th Fajr International Film Festival.

=== 2002–2012: Filmmaking the expensive TV series in the history of Iran ===
==== In the Wind's Eye (2008) ====
He spent most of the 2002–2012 writing and directing the TV series In the Wind's Eye (a 44 piece TV series of 50 minutes each) shown on IRIB TV1, which was a must-see program on TV and told the story of Iran from the Mirza Kuchik Khan's uprising to the Iran–Iraq War. The script was written in two years by Jafari Jozani.

This historical TV series In the Wind's Eye was telling three historical periods: the first was the end of the Qajar Iran and beginning of the Pahlavi dynasty, the second was World War II and a special time after the revolution which was after the Battle of Khorramshahr. Making this series with 480 locations in over 10 other cities and provinces was one of the biggest television productions.

=== 2015: Return to Cinema ===
==== Iran Burger (2015) ====
The feature film Iran Burger, Jozani's only comedy made, with the help of a local and folkloric atmosphere, and a script written in situation comedy, was made into a high selling film.

==== Behind the Wall of Silence (2017) ====
His other film was Behind the Wall of Silence which is focused on Aids and was made with the help of the people's organizations, was invited by the 61st conference of women (CSW), and was supposed to be shown on 20 March 2017 with the presence of the main characters in the gathering at non-governmental organizations (NGO) and people-centered institutions in support of the mothers and children suffering from HIV/AIDS in the Headquarters of the United Nations in New York in the US was due to the United States president, Donald Trump's discrimination and racist decision of not giving visas to the people of this movie to go to the United Nations and attend the main UN conference and was canceled.

==== Paradise of criminals (2020) ====
In 2020, he began making the film Paradise of Criminals, which also deals with the events of the nationalization of the oil industry.

== Unfinished projects ==
=== Films ===
==== Baskerville ====
The script is based on the life of Howard Baskerville, an American teacher in the American Memorial School in Tabriz who was killed during the Persian Constitutional Revolution in an attempt to break the siege of Tabriz. Jafari Jozani wrote this script in 1995, and the Hozeh Honari purchased it the same year. In 1998, Jafari Jozani and Shahriar Rohanwere bought it from the Hozeh Honari, and Ebtekar Publishing published it.

In the years afterward, Jafari Jozani signed contracts with American and Canadian film studios to produce the Baskerville film in Iran. Still, each failed for some reason, except for the most recent agreement signed with the association searching for a common ground, which even obtained official permission from the Ministry of Culture and Islamic Guidance to produce the film. According to the American newspaper Le Figaro, an American producer decided to use Brad Pitt as Howard Baskerville; However, for whatever reason, the film was never made. Finally, the American and Iranian Screenwriters Association in the United States and Canada registered the Baskerville scripts titled after Jafari Jozani and Mohammad Mehdi Dadgoo.

In 2005, Jafari Jozani was informed that an Iranian filmmaker based in the United States announced that he was planning to travel to Turkey to make Baskerville. Jozani reacted to the media and announced that he was filing a lawsuit for stealing works of art in Iran and the United States.

In 2010 Jafari Jozani, after obtaining a filming license in the United States, decided to make the TV series Baskerville. He tried to make this TV series with the financial assistance of the Iranian and American companies, but it did not work out.

==== Cyrus the Great ====
Jafari Jozani wrote the screenplay of Cyrus the Great in the style of an adapted screenplay based on the life story of Cyrus the Great with the researcher Fathullah Jafari Jozani and Abdul Karim Younesi.

The character of Cyrus is highly significant in terms of historical and national standing. Still, big powers without history and culture are attempting to deny Iran's position in the world, so the construction of this project was on the agenda.

Ali Moallem, one of the producers, introduced Jafari Jozani as the director. After the death of Ali Moallem, Jafari Jozani handed over the script to the investors. Before that, he covered the project costs with his capital. The project started after concluding a contract with foreign investors, but stopped for some reason.

=== Television series ===
==== Khawaja Nasir al-Din al-Tusi ====
Jafari Jozani was going to make a TV series about Nasir al-Din al-Tusi after the TV series In the Wind's Eye for Simafilm. However, Khawaja Nasir al-Din al-Tusi did not get made.

==== Pourya-ye Vali ====
Jafari Jozani wrote the script for Pourya-ye Vali for a TV series in five seasons (52 episodes of 50 min). Although the contract for this series was signed in 2013 by the Islamic Republic of Iran Broadcasting, it was not produced due to a change in management of IRIB, and finally Anapana Publishing published it.

Fathollah Jafari Jozani and Doctor Abdulkarim Yunesi, the researchers of this script, used over 30 books, including Jami' al-tawarikh, Tarikh-i Jahangushay, and The Cambridge History of Iran.

The life story of Pahlavān Mahmoud, more commonly known as Pouryā-ye Vali, begins in 1219 when the Mongolians assaulted Iran. Between 1270 and 1283, Iranian manufacturers were treated as slaves by the Mongol rulers and compelled to build weapons for them. Rural subjects who couldn't pay their taxes for themselves and their families were sold. During this time, Pouria-ye Vali was able to bring together liberals and fighters by organizing and building traditional sporting halls known as Zurkhaneh.

The other historical characters of this script are Saadi Shirazi, Ubayd Zakani, Nasir al-Din al-Tusi, Rashid al-Din Hamadani, and the wrestling champion File Hamedani.

==== Ya'qub ibn al-Layth ====
Jafari Jozani and the Farabi Cinema Foundation concluded the contract for Ya'qub ibn al-Layth. Ya'qub ibn al-Layth's screenplay about the founder of the Saffarid dynasty in Sistan and his chivalry, simple life, and his role in history in uniting the Iranian people.

Ya'qub ibn al-Layth al-Saffar was a young Ayyār who was under the influence of Rostam's stories, decided to help the poor and oppressed people with the help of the small group of young Ayyars that had gathered around him and in the opinion of the people of Sistan became a legendary champion. The script will be aired on the Home Video.

Jafari Jozani said in one of his interviews:

"Unfortunately, our children know more about Robin Hood than Ya'gub Al-Layth while he is one of the historical figures who has founded Ayyār-i and Futuwwa in Iran and teaches the youth how a better life is possible."

== Filmography ==
=== Short films ===
- 1976 – Remember the Flight (5 min.)
- 1977 – Caged (6 min. claymation)
- 1978 – Conception (20 min., claymation, won the 1978 Student Academy Award, played on the KQED (P.B.S) in the United States and the Islamic Republic of Iran Broadcasting)
- 1979 – Towards Freedom (100 min. Documentary, played on Iranian television)
- 1984 – Escape, based on the Masnavi-ye-Man'avi (the book by Rumi the Persian poet, 16 min., Claymation, for the Islamic Republic of Iran Broadcasting)
- 1984 – Broken Image, based on the Masnavi-ye-Man'avi (the book by Rumi the Persian poet, 25 min. Claymation, for the Islamic Republic of Iran Broadcasting)
- 1985 – Speak to Me (30 min. for the Institute for the Intellectual Development of Children and Young Adults)

=== Feature films ===
- 1985 – Frosty Roads (director)
- 1986 – The Stone Lion (Persian: شیر سنگی (فیلم), romanized: Shir Sangi) (writer and director)
- 1989 – Eye of the Hurricane (writer and director)
- 1991 – Shadow of Imagination (writer and director)
- 1992 – A Man and a Bear (writer and director)
- 1992 – Once Upon a Time, Cinema (producer)
- 1994 – Heart and Dagger (writer and director)
- 1999 – Puberty (writer and director)
- 2001 – Her Eyes (writer and producer)
- 2015 – Iran Burger (writer and director)
- 2017 – Behind the Wall of Silence (writer and director)
- 2021 – The Wheels and Feet of the Runner (docudrama / producer)
- 2024 – Paradise of Criminals (writer and director)

=== Television series ===
- 2009 – 2010 – In the Wind's Eye (writer and director), IRIB TV1

== Scripts ==
Type:

Play (theatre)

Screenplay

Short story

Writing date	Title	Publication date	Publisher	Notes
1970	Black Nanny			
1970–71	Stories Have Become Sorrows			
1971	Resalat			
1976	Remember the Flight			
1977	Caged			
1978	The Conception			
1981	Billy			
1983	Broken Image			
1983	The Escape			
1988	The Stone Lion			
1988	The Highest peak	1988	Ghamous monthly	
1989	Eye of the Hurricane			
1989	Shadow of Imagination	1991	Najva	
1990	A Man, A Bear	1982	Rowzaneh	
1991	Baskerville	2000	Ebtekar	
1994	Bashir	1994	Sorush magazine	
1995	Barkooleh			
1995	The Heart and Dagger			
1996	Storm's nest			
1997	Al-Jahad			
1999	Khawaja Nasir al-Din al-Tusi			
2000	Maturity			
2001	Her Eyes			
2002	Beyond the Wall			
2003	Iran Burger	2016	Anapana	
2004	In the Wind's Eye	2009	Sorush	
2004	Raisons selling Boy			
2010	Pourya-ye Vali	2018	Anapana	
2012	Cyrus the Great	2016	Trita	
2015	A Tale of Love			
2017	Behind the Wall of Silence	2019	Anapana	
2020	Criminals Heaven			
2021	Ya'qub ibn al-Layth			

== Awards and honors ==
- Frosty Roads was a winner of the Special Jury Award for Best Film from the Fourth Fajr International Film Festival – 1986.
- Frosty Roads was a winner of the Tablet for Appreciation of Masoud Jafari Jozani as the Best Director from the First Cultural–Artistic Village – 1987.
- The Stone Lion was a winner of the Crystal Simorgh for best script from the 5th Fajr International Film Festival – 1987.
- The Crystal Simorgh for Jafari Jozani's lifetime of Artistic achievements and celebrating him in the 26th Fajr International Film Festival – 2008
- Jafari Jozani was chosen at the 8th conference of Immanent Faces of Iran – 2010.
- The President of Iran appreciated Jafari Jozani in the unveiling of five volumes of documents of Iran's occupation during World War II – 2011.
- Jafari Jozani was presented the Golden Statue at the first International Film Festival of Kish – 2011.
- In the Wind's Eye won the Hafiz award for best Television Direction from the Picture World's 12th festivities of Cinema-Television – 2012.
- First Class Badge for directing, and doctorate in Cinematic Directing – 2015
- Jafari Jozani was appreciated for his many artistic and cultural achievements by the Academy of Iranian-American Doctors – 2016.
- Ambassador of Water – 2016
- Jafari Jozani was the Iranian Art Ambassador at the 11th Delhi International Arts Festival (DIAF), India – 2017.
- Jafari Jozani was celebrated at the first Conference of Development of Malayer in Iran – 2018.
- In the Wind's Eye won best Direction for Television and Best TV series in the 14th edition of Moghavemat International Festival – 2019.
- Special Appreciation by the international advisor for national commission UNESCO-Iran and the Human Rights Commission for 2nd region of Iran – 2019
- Bukhara magazine held the night of Masoud Jafari Jozani at the House of Humanities Thinkers – 2019.
- Winner of the Turquoise Statue of Simorgh and the memorial plaque from Doctor Mohammad Soltanifar, the deputy minister of Culture and Islamic Guidance in the first Arman Bartar National Present Festival – 2018
- Certificate of Appreciation and Statue from the third Festival of National health Film Festival – 2018
- Won the first Statue of Abureyhan at the First National Iranian Film Producers Guild – 2020

== National and international festivals judgment ==
- Chairman of the International Cinema Competition at the fourth International Films for Children and Young Adults – 1989
- Jury member of the Iranian Cinema Competition at the seventh Fajr International Film Festival – 1989
- Jury member of the Iranian Cinema Competition at the tenth Fajr International Film Festival – 1992
- Jury member of the short films at the 14th Fajr International Film Festival – 1996
- Jury member of the International Film at the 6th International Film Festival of the Sacred Defense – 1997
- Jury member of Iranian Cinema at the 13th International Films for Children and Young Adults – 1999
- Jury member of the fifth celebration of Khaneh Cinema – 2002
- Jury member of Iranian Cinema at the 26th Fajr International Film Festival – 2008
- Jury member of Iranian Cinema at the 28th Fajr International Film Festival – 2010
- Jury member of International Film Festival "Varna" in Bulgaria – 2013
- Jury member of the International Film Festival (SAARC) in Sri Lanka – 2016
- Jury member of the first Shanghai Cooperation Organisation "SCO" International Film Festival in China – 2019
- Jury member of National Cinema Competition at the 15th Resistance International Film Festival – 2019

== International praise and criticism ==
Kevin Thomas, a journalist of the American newspaper Los Angeles Times, in the article "Iran's 'Man, a Bear' Finds Humor, Heart", published on 12 July 1996, wrote:

"Once past an awkward start, Masoud Jafari Jozani's "A Man, a Bear" emerges as a courageous satirical allegory on authoritarianism and hardship in contemporary Iran."

"Yet, along with its outspokenness, "A Man, a Bear" is also a warm, endearing and often very funny film."

Ben Walters published an article entitled "First Iranian film shot in US since 1979 gets under way" in British newspaper The Guardian on 1 September 2009, in which he wrote:

Production is to begin on the first Iranian film shot in the US since the Islamic Revolution. In the Wind's Eye, directed by veteran filmmaker Masoud Jafari Jozani, is also reported to have the highest-ever budget for an Iranian film at $12m (£7.3m).

American Variety, the oldest and most prestigious magazine in world cinema, in a report on 8 September 2009 entitled "Open door policy: L.A. lures Iran crew", examined the production of the series In the Wind's Eye and stated:

As the American public was riveted by the spectacle of riot police suppressing the massive demonstrations disputing the results of Iran's June 12 election, one crack appeared in the wall between the two countries. Surprisingly, Iranian helmer Masoud Jafari Jozani managed to secure visas for members of his cast and crew to travel to and film in the U.S. — the first Iranian production to do so since the 1979 Islamic Revolution.

Indiewire, a film industry and review website, wrote in a report on the production of the series In the Wind's Eye entitled "Jafari project the first Iranian production filming in the U.S. since the Islamic Revolution in 1979":

Based on a 52-hour epic television series that took four years to produce and recently began airing on Iranian television, "Dar Chashme Bad", production has begun in Los Angeles on a companion feature film, "In The Wind's Eye". Following three generations of Iranians from 1920 through 1981, with an overall budget of $12 million, the project will be the longest running and most expensive production in that country's film industry's history. It is also the first Iranian production filmed in the US since the revolution in 1979. Veteran filmmaker, Masoud Jafari Jozani, has written and directed each episode of the series, as well as the screenplay for the feature film, which will be released in theatres in Iran.

James Reinl, a reporter from the United States, wrote a report entitled "Iranian movie cameras roll in US" for UAE newspaper The National on 14 September 2009 about the permission to shoot In the Wind's Eye, in which he wrote:

As Washington and Tehran perform a diplomatic dance over Iran's suspected nuclear weapons programme, one group of Iranian filmmakers has benefited from the apparent thaw in relations between the long-standing enemies. Masoud Jafari Jozani, an Iranian director, secured a dozen visas to enter the United States and film a movie. "This would have been unheard of a year ago," said Jozani, who is filming In the Wind's Eye in California. He described his Iranian crew as the first such group of film-makers granted entry to the United States since the Islamic Revolution in 1979.
