= Verdict (2005 film) =

The Command
- Theatrical poster
- Directed by: Masoud Kimiai
- Written by: Masoud Kimiai
- Produced by: Masoud Kimiai
- Starring: Poulad Kimiayi; Ezzatollah Entezami; Khosro Shakibai; Leila Hatami; Bahram Radan
- Cinematography: Alireza Zarrindast
- Edited by: Jafar Panahi
- Music by: Majid Entezami>br>Kaveh Nasehi
- Release date: 2005
- Running time: 104 minutes
- Country: Iran
- Language: Persian

The Command (Persian: حکم) lit. is a 2005 Iranian film directed by Masoud Kimiai. It stars Poulad Kimiayi, Ezzatollah Entezami, Khosro Shakibai, Leila Hatami, Bahram Radan. It is the 25th film by Kimiai. The film tells the story of gangster relations in Iran and a love story between two former lovers.

== Plot ==
Mohsen (Poulad Kimiayi) and Foroozandeh (Leila Hatami) are a former couple. They and Sahand (Bahram Radan), who is their friend, go to an Engineer manager's house to rob his safe. After that, they go to Reza Maroufi (Ezzatollah Entezami), an old retired gangster to take a fake passport for Foroozandeh. Mohsen and Forozandeh struggle in the way and Foroozandeh returns to Tehran. Maroufi and Sahand also come back to Maroufi's house in Tehran and they see Foroozandeh that is injured by Mohsen .....

== The cast ==
- Ezzatollah Entezami as Reza Maroufi
- Khosro Shakibai as Had-e-Misagh
- Leila Hatami as Foroozandeh
- Poulad Kimiayi as Mohsen
- Bahram Radan as Sahand
- Merila Zarei as Darya
- Jalal Pishvayian as Habib
- Bahram Fattahi as Jalal
