= Herbert Weinstock =

American writer

- Weinstock c.1946
- Born: 16 November 1905; Milwaukee, Wisconsin, US
- Died: 21 October 1971 (aged 65); New York City, US
- Occupations: Writer and editor

Herbert Weinstock (16 November 1905 – 21 October 1971) was an American writer, music historian, editor and translator. A prolific writer on musical subjects, he was particularly known for his biographies of the bel canto opera composers Rossini, Donizetti, and Bellini which he published between 1963 and 1971. Weinstock was born in Milwaukee, Wisconsin but from 1930 was based in New York City where he became the music editor of the Alfred A. Knopf publishing house in 1943. He died in New York at the age of 65, survived by his long-time companion, Ben Meiselman.

== Life and career ==
Weinstock was born in Milwaukee, Wisconsin. He briefly attended the University of Chicago but left to start his own a bookstore. After running the bookstore for three years, he moved to New York City. He published his first books on music in 1939 and 1941, Men of Music: Their Lives, Times, and Achievements and The Opera, a History of its Creation and Performance, both co-authored with Wallace Brockway (1905–1972). Weinstock and Brockway had been close friends since their time as students at the University of Chicago.

Weinstock became the music editor for Alfred A. Knopf in 1943 and remained associated with that publishing house for the remainder of his career, apart from a period between 1959 and 1963 when he worked for Doubleday and Macmillan. In 1943 he also published the first of his composer biographies, Tchaikovsky. It was followed by Handel (1946), Chopin: The Man and His Music (1949), Donizetti and the World of Opera in Italy, Paris and Vienna in the first half of the Nineteenth Century (1963) and Rossini (1968). His last biography, Vincenzo Bellini: His Life and His Operas was published shortly after his death in 1971 and was the first, full‐length critical biography of Bellini in English.

From the early 1930s Weinstock had been a friend, champion, and chronicler of the Mexican composer Carlos Chávez. He wrote a lengthy analysis of his music for The Musical Quarterly in 1936 and translated his Hacia una nueva música: ensayo sobre música y electricidad into English for publication by Norton in 1937. He also wrote the notes to a series of concerts given by Chávez at New York's Museum of Modern Art in 1940 and the biography for the catalogue of Chávez works published by the Pan American Union in 1944.

Weinstock died in New York City at the age of 65 following an operation. At the time of his death he was working on a biography of Gluck. In his review of Weinstock's Bellini biography, Alan Rich wrote that his qualities as a biographer "combined the story‐teller's gift with an enthusiasm for great works of art that made Weinstock the envy of all who knew him." He also wrote that as the music editor at Knopf, Weinstock "was responsible for guiding into print some of the best, most readable and most important writing about music" that the 20th century had produced.

The Herbert Weinstock Collection at the New York Public Library contains professional and personal papers, letters, and memorabilia belonging to Weinstock, members of his family, and Weinstock's long-time companion, Ben Meiselman. (Note: Ruth Franklin, the biographer of Shirley Jackson, wrote that "Weinstock was among the very few relatively uncloseted gay men in New York publishing in the 1940s." Weinstock and Meiselman were frequent house guests at the Vermont home of Jackson and her husband Stanley Hyman.) Meiselman, who died in 1989, also donated a large collection of Weinstock's scores and music books to the music department of Bar-Ilan University.

== Works ==
In addition to his books and translations, Weinstock was a music critic for The Saturday Review, The New York Times, and from 1966 for the British journal Opera. He also contributed over 300 articles on music to the Encyclopedia Americana as well as numerous notes for recordings and concert programs.

=== Books ===
- Herbert Weinstock and Wallace Brockway (1939). Men of Music: Their Lives, Times, and Achievements. Simon and Schuster (31 editions published between 1939 and 1966)
- Herbert Weinstock and Wallace Brockway (1941). The Opera, a History of its Creation and Performance. Simon and Schuster (34 editions published between 1941 and 1966)
- Herbert Weinstock (1943). Tchaikovsky. Alfred A. Knopf (32 editions published between 1943 and 1980)
- Herbert Weinstock (1946). Handel. Alfred A. Knopf (36 editions published between 1946 and 1979)
- Herbert Weinstock (1949). Chopin: The Man and His Music. Alfred A. Knopf (23 editions published between 1949 and 1981)
- Herbert Weinstock (1953). Music as an Art. Harcourt Brace (1 edition)
- Irene Gass (Note: Irene Gass (1885–1968) was an English school teacher and writer of children's books, many of them on musical subjects. The daughter of a Congregational minister, she also wrote the words for several hymns and Christmas carols as well as Eric Thiman's Christmas cantata Flower of Bethlehem. She taught at Bristol Grammar School for most of her working life.) and Herbert Weinstock (1958). Through an Opera Glass. Abelard-Schuman (for younger readers, 2 editions)
- Herbert Weinstock (1963). Donizetti and the World of Opera in Italy, Paris and Vienna in the first half of the Nineteenth Century. Pantheon Books (40 editions published between 1963 and 1986)
- Herbert Weinstock (1966). What Music Is. Doubleday (revised and expanded version of Music as an Art, 19 editions published between 1966 and 1988)
- Herbert Weinstock (1968). Rossini. Alfred A. Knopf (42 editions published between 1968 and 1987)
- Herbert Weinstock (1971). Vincenzo Bellini: His Life and His Operas. Alfred A. Knopf (28 editions published between 1971 and 1980)

=== Translated books ===
- Carlos Chávez (1937). Toward a New Music: Music and Electricity, W. W. Norton & Co. (translated from the Spanish Hacia una nueva música: ensayo sobre música y electricidad)
- Francesco Carletti (1964). My Voyage Around the World. Pantheon Books (translated from the Italian Ragionamenti del mio viaggio intorno al mondo)
- Pierre Boulez (1968). Notes of an Apprenticeship. Alfred A. Knopf (a collection of previously published essays translated from the original French)
- Edmond Michotte (1968). Richard Wagner's visit to Rossini (Paris 1860) and An Evening at Rossini's in Beau-Sejour (Passy 1858). University of Chicago Press (translated from the French La visite de R. Wagner à Rossini (Paris 1860) and Une soirée chez Rossini à Beau-Séjour (Passy 1858))
- Jacques Chailley (1971). The Magic Flute, Masonic Opera. Alfred A. Knopf (translated from the French La Flûte enchantée, opéra maçonnique)
