= Maziar Lorestani =

Iranian actor and screenwriter

Mazyar lorestani
- مازیار لرستانی
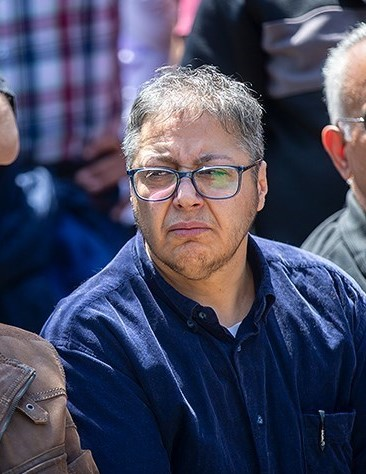
- Born: Shohreh Salehi Lorestani; June 21, 1966 (age 59); Tehran, Iran
- Occupations: Actor; Screenwriter; Director
- Years active: 1985–present

Maziar Lorestani (born October 18, 1966, Tehran) is an Iranian director and film, television, and stage actor.

== Early life and education ==
Lorestani was born in Tehran. His father was a judge, and his mother was a teacher. The two were initially unsupportive of Lorestani's desire to pursue theatre as a career, but came to support him after seeing his theatre projects.

Lorestani graduated from Islamic Azad University, where he studied music. The performance of his thesis show, Matori, was cancelled, due to the show containing dance.

== Career ==
In 2021, Lorestani organized the digital "coo.coo 19" festival, which exhibited creative works created by children during the COVID-19 pandemic.

=== Acting ===
Lorestani began acting in the 1980s under the name Shohreh Lorestani. He debuted in the 1987 film Goldooneh Khanom. He began acting in television series in 1990.

=== Directing ===
By 2013, Lorestani was working on a documentary for the United Nations on children's education in rural Iranian villages.

In 2014, Lorestani produced and directed the children's television series Adventures of Aunt Dena and Sheplek (ماجراهای خاله دنا و شپلک). The 26-episode series had the character of Aunt Dena introducing children to various animals.

==== Theatre ====
As of 2013, Lorestani had directed 17 theatrical productions.

In 2015, Lorestani directed a production of Pinnochia at Tehran's Iranshahr Theatre Hall.

In September 2023, Lorestani directed a production of Waiting for Godot at Charsu Hall of Tehran's City Theater Complex. The play planned to run until October 22.

== Filmography ==
=== Films ===
Year	Film	Role	Ref
1987	Goldooneh Khanom		
1993	Three Common Man		
1996	Leily Is with Me	Elaheh	
2009	Checkmate		
2014	Bavar-e Aramesh		
2014	Khanem Sadat		
2015	Iran Burger	Jahan Banoo	
2018	Centipede	Shirin	
2018	Don't Be Embarrassed		

=== Television ===
Year	Series	Role	Ref
	Once Upon Time		
	Green House		
	Neighbors		
	Red		
	Final Shot		
	Family Restaurant		
	Younghood		
	For the Last Time		
	Unfinished		
	The Eight Stage		
	Shaheed-e Kufa	Maryam Bint Osman	
2008	SMS from Another World		
2010	Mokhtarnameh	Hamdanid woman	
2010	Rich and Poor		
2013	We are not angels		
2020	Tweezers		

== Personal life ==
In 2022, Lorestani came out as a transgender man and announced he would be going by the first name Maziar.
