= Pamenar =

Pamenar پامنار
- Village
- Location within Iran
- Coordinates: 32°37′25″N 48°29′24″E
- Country: Iran
- Province: Khuzestan
- County: Dezful
- Bakhsh: Sardasht
- Rural District: Shahi

Population (2006)
  - Total: 168
- Time zone: UTC+3:30 (IRST)
  - Summer (DST): UTC+4:30 (IRDT)

Pamenar (Persian: پامنار, also Romanized as Pāmenār) is a village in Shahi Rural District, Sardasht District, Dezful County, Khuzestan Province, Iran. At the 2006 census, its population was 168, in 39 families.
