= Poulad Kimiayi =

Iranian actor

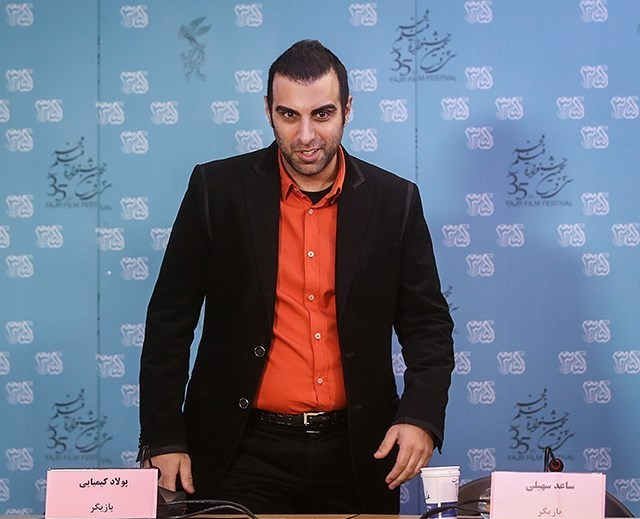
- Born: 1980 (age 45–46); Tehran, Iran
- Occupations: Actor, Film director, Musician
- Years active: 1988–present
- Parents: Masoud Kimiai (father); Giti Pashaei (mother)

Poulad Kimiayi (or Poulad Kimiai; Persian: پولاد کیمیایی) is an Iranian actor, film director, and musician. He is best known for his role in the Gradual Death of a Dream series (2008) by Iranian director Arpa Foundation award-winning Fereydoun Jeyrani and the film series Guidance Patrol (2012–2017–2020) which was temporarily banned six days after its initial release.

== Early life and education ==
Poulad Kimiayi was born in 1980 in Tehran to Masoud Kimiai and Giti Pashaei. His childhood and teenage was mostly spent in Germany. when he was 5, his mother gave him his first musical training to play piano. He debuted at age eight with a minor appearance in his father's film, The Lead, in 1988. He came back to Iran after playing in the movie Trade and following his mother's sickness.

Since Masoud Kimiai had decided to make a movie starring Googoosh, he traveled to Cuba and Canada with his father in 2009. He studied Digital Media at Seneca polytechnic and returned to Iran after graduation in 2002.

== Career ==
Poulad Kimiayi started his film career as cast in his father's movies, which received much criticism. To answer the Press and criticisms, explained that the roles he has played in Masoud Kimiai movies were both an opportunity and a hindrance. In an attempt to avoid criticism for always playing male hero roles in Masoud Kimiai movies, he took on a different gender role in the film "Guidance Patrol". His performance earned him a nomination for the Crystal Simorgh award for the second role of a man from the 30th Fajr Film Festival.

In 2019, he wrote the screenplay for the film Reverse and directed it as his very first movie. This film was screened in the New Look section of the 37th Fajr Film Festival. He pursued his interest in theater and made his debut in 2023 with a role in the Concert show "The Story of Lasting Songs" at Roudaki Hall in Tehran.

== Filmography ==
=== Film ===
Year	Title	Role	Director
1988	The Lead	The child beside the cinema	Masoud Kimiai
1994	Trade	Reza	Masoud Kimiai
1996	The King	Adel	Masoud Kimiai
1998	Shout		Masoud Kimiai
2000	Protest	Yousef	Masoud Kimiai
2004	A Candle in the Wind	Farbod	Pouran Derakhshandeh
2004	The Friday's Soldiers	Saeed	Masoud Kimiai
2005	The Command	Mohsen Cheshmehsari	Masoud Kimiai
2005	Crime Scene, No Entry		Ebrahim Sheibani
2007	The Boss	Siyamak	Masoud Kimiai
2009	Trial on the Street	Amir	Masoud Kimiai
2009	Life with Closed Eyes	Omid	Rasoul Sadr Ameli
2010	Shoot the Target		Mohamad Katiraei
2011	Crime	Reza Sarcheshmeh	Masoud Kimiai
2011	The smell of wheat	Shahrokh	Mohamadreza Khaki
2012	Guidance Patrol 1	Ataa	Saeed Soheili
2014	Metropole	Kaveh	Masoud Kimiai
2014	Zero	Mr.Kasmaei	Masoud Yazdanifar
2017	Guidance Patrol 2	Ataa	Saeed Soheili
2017	Domestic Killer	Bahman	Masoud Kimiai
2017	Asphyxia	Mansour	Fereydoun Jeyrani
2019	Selfie with Democracy	Visitation angel, Khoshouei	Ali atshaani
2020	Guidance Patrol 3	Ataa	Saeed Soheili
2022	Liable		Farnaz Amini
2022	Killing a Traitor	Shahrokh	Masoud Kimiai

=== As director and writer ===
Year	Title	Director	writer	Producer
2019	Reverse	Poulad Kimiyai	Poulad Kimiyai	Masoud Kimiyai

=== Television series ===
Year	Title	Role	Director	Network
2006	Blood Money	Rasoul	Javad Mozdabadi	IRIB TV1
2007	Gradual Death of a Dream series	Aras Mashreghi	Fereydoun Jeyrani	IRIB TV2
2008	The Same day	Saam	Alireza Amini	IRIB TV1
2011	The 6th Person	Adib Asayesh	Bahman Goudarzi	IRIB TV3
2013	Matador	Amin Hamed	Farhad Najafi	IRIB TV1

== Theatre ==
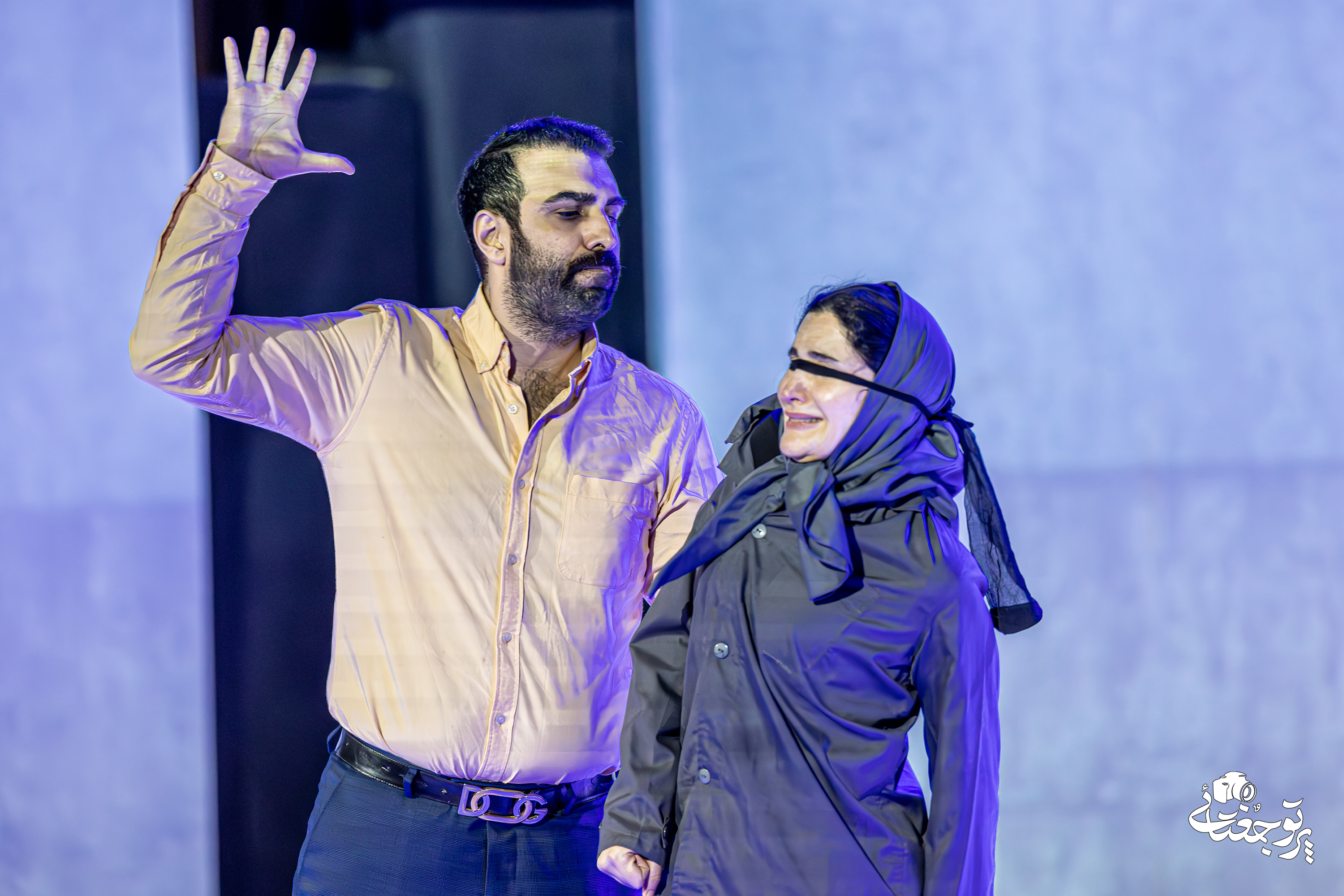
Poulad Kimiayi on theatre stage

Year	Title	Role	Director	Stage
2023	The Story of Lasting Songs	Actor	Seyyed Jalal-al-din Dorri	Roudaki Hall
2024	Galileo	Singer	Shahab-al-din Hosseinpour	City Theater of Tehran
2024	The Story of Lasting Songs	Actor	Seyyed Jalal-al-din Dorri	Sa'dabad Complex

== See also ==
- Cinema of Iran
- List of Iranian male actors
