= Hurie Moghadam =

Iranian actress

- Born: Hurie Moghadam; October 30, 1987 (age 37); Tehran, Iran
- Occupation: Actress

Hurie Moghadam (born 30 October 1987) is an Iranian actress, Writer and director.

== Filmography ==
- 2024 Seven Heads of the Dragon (TV series)
- 2022 Ostad (film)
- 2020 Zir Khaki (TV series)
- 2020 Truck (TV series)
- 2019 Prisoners (film)
