= Fariba Motekhasses =

Iranian actress

- فریبا متخصص
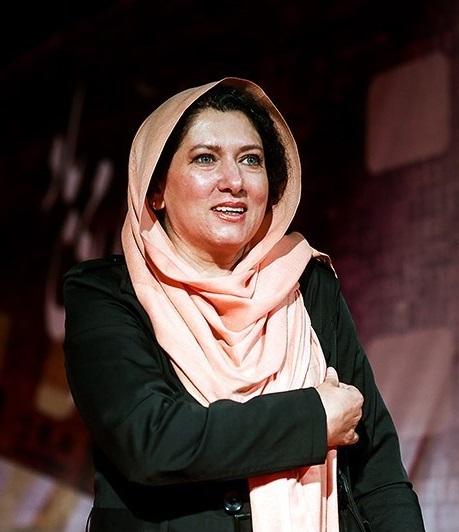
- Fariba Motekhasses, 2015
- Born: July 23, 1961 (age 65); Borujerd, Iran
- Occupations: Actor, voice actress
- Spouse: Mohsen Pourbahrami
- Children: Pouria Pourbahrami

Fariba Motekhasses (Persian: فریبا متخصص) is an Iranian actress known for her work in Iranian cinema, television, and theater. She has appeared in numerous films and TV series and participated actively in theater festivals.

== Early life and career ==
Fariba Motekhasses was born on July 23, 1961, in Borujerd, Lorestan Province, Iran. Her father, originally from Borujerd and of Lur ethnicity, and her mother, from Tehran, moved the family to Abadan due to her father's job. After his retirement in 1976, they relocated to Tehran. Fariba grew up in a large family with five siblings and credits her father as one of her main supporters in pursuing acting.

From childhood, Fariba was drawn to acting, showcasing her talent by mimicking teachers' voices during school breaks. This passion grew in her teenage years when she attended acting classes at Bagh-e Ferdows. In 1980, at the age of 19, she began her professional career with the theater play Morvarid, directed by Akbar Zanjanpour.

Fariba entered the film industry in 1984 with the movie Shab-e Mokaafat, directed by Faramarz Baseri, and debuted on television the same year with the series Taleb, directed by Abdolreza Akbari. In 1989, she joined radio as a voice actress and narrator for radio plays, where her distinctive voice gained recognition. Over the years, she received over nine domestic and international awards for her radio work until her retirement from the medium.

Fariba earned a bachelor’s degree in sociology in 1991 and later pursued cinema studies in Cyprus. She also studied briefly in Germany. These educational experiences, combined with her early career, laid a strong foundation for her work in theater, film, television, and radio. Her particular fondness for theater led to a significant presence in the 1980s and 1990s, though her theater activities later decreased due to other professional commitments.

== Filmography ==
=== Cinema ===
| Year | Title | Director |
|---|---|---|
| 1984 | Shab-e Mokaafat | Faramarz Baseri |
| 1984 | Shengool o Mangool | |
| 1989 | Khab-e Zemestani | |
| 1995 | Mah Pishooni | Ali Akbar Koohaki, Javad Ershad |
| 1995 | Roozi Ke Khastgar Amad | Faryal Behzad |
| 1998 | Sibe Sorkh-e Hava | Saeed Assadi |
| 2004 | Max | Saman Moghadam |
| 2006 | Aroosi-ye Maman | |
| 2008 | Az Ma Behtaran | |
| 2008 | Ashiane-i Baraye Zendegi | Hamid Taleghani |
| 2014 | Iran Burger | Masoud Jafari Jozani |
| 2016 | Posht-e Divar-e Sokoot | Masoud Jafari Jozani |
| 2016 | Eshgholance | Mohsen Mahini |
| 2016 | Aba Jan | Hatef Alimardani |
| 2016 | Zir-e Saghf-e Doodi | Pouran Derakhshandeh |
| 2019 | Knockout | Farnaz Amini |
| 2020 | Baraye Marjan | Hamid Zargarnezhad |
| 2020 | BPM Band | Farnaz Amini |
| 2023 | Behesht-e Tabbahkaran | Masoud Jafari Jozani |

=== Television ===
| Year | Title | Director | Network |
|---|---|---|---|
| 1984 | Taleb | Abdolreza Akbari | Channel 1 |
| 1985 | Andar Lataef-e Roozegar | Mansour Kooshan | |
| 1988 | Galesh-haye Madarbozorg | Bahman Zarrinpour | Channel 1 |
| 1991 | Vazirmokhtar | Saeed Nikpour | Channel 1 |
| 1991 | Qabil | Hamid Tamjidi | |
| 1992 | Mazd-e Tars | Hamid Tamjidi | Channel 2 |
| 1992 | Bia Ta Gol Barafshanim | Khosro Malekan | |
| 1993 | Norooz 72 | Dariush Kardan | Channel 1 |
| 1993 | Hamsayeha | Hassan Fathi | Channel 1 |
| 1993 | Bagh-e Gilas | Majid Beheshti | Channel 1 |
| 1993 | Malke-haye Faranse (TV theater) | Hassan Fathi | Channel 2 |
| 1994 | Nimeh-ye Penhan-e Mah | Majid Jafari | Channel 1 |
| 1994 | Avaye Faghteh | Bahman Zarrinpour | Channel 1 |
| 1994 | Alaeddin | Houshang Tavakoli | Channel 1 |
| 1995 | Jay-e Khali-ye Darya | Houshang Tavakoli | |
| 1996 | Bebakhshid | Reza Karam Rezaei | |
| 1996 | Khesis-e Dehkade-ye Rogaford (TV theater) | Kourosh Narimani | Channel 2 |
| 1997 | Dar Pey-e Faghteh | Masoud Abparvar | |
| 1997 | Delhaye Shad | Hamid Ghadakchian | Channel 2 |
| 1997 | Jan Gabriel Borkman (TV theater) | Hassan Fathi | Channel 2 |
| 1997 | Qatar-e Arvah (TV theater) | Reza Karam Rezaei | Channel 2 |
| 1998 | Tavallodi Digar | Dariush Farhang | Channel 5 |
| 1998 | Cheshm Be Rah | Asghar Farhadi | Channel 5 |
| 1998 | Hameye Pesaran-e Man (TV theater) | Mohammad Rahmanian | Channel 4 |
| 1999 | Zaman-e Shooridegi | Mohammad Ali Najafi | Channel 1 |
| 1999 | Telefon-e Moshtarak | Khosro Malekan | Channel 1 |
| 2000 | Khastgari-ye Pormajara | Mohammad Banaei | Channel 2 |
| 2000 | Hamsafar | Qasem Jafari | Channel 3 |
| 2001 | Shab-e Aftabi | Qasem Jafari | Channel 3 |
| 2003 | Dar Cheshm-e Baad | Masoud Jafari Jozani | Channel 1 |
| 2004 | Booy-e Gharib-e Paeiz | Mojtaba Yasini | Channel 2 |
| 2005 | Payan-e Namayesh | Bahman Zarrinpour | Channel 1 |
| 2006 | Be Donya Beguied Bayistad | Mohammadreza Ahang | Channel 5 |
| 2006 | Salam | Mohammadreza Farzin | Channel 5 |
| 2007 | Saye-ye Tanhaei | Bijan Shokriz | Channel 1 |
| 2009 | Be Koja Chenin Shetaban | Abolghasem Talebi | Channel 5 |
| 2010 | Malkoot | Mohammadreza Ahang | Channel 2 |
| 2012 | Zamane | Hassan Fathi | Channel 3 |
| 2012 | Amaliyat 125 (Season 3) | Masoud Abparvar | Channel 5 |
| 2013 | Setare-ye Hayat | Javad Ershad | Channel 3 |
| 2014 | Kifar | Hossein Tabrizi | Channel 2 |
| 2016 | Ghorreh | Borzou Niknejad | Channel 3 |
| 2018 | Rahayam Nakon | Mohammad Mahdi Asgarpour | Channel 3 |
| 2019 | Melkavan | Ahmad Moazzami | iFilm |
| 2020 | Sharm | Ahmad Kavari | Channel 3 |
| 2021 | Roozhaye Abi | Mohammadreza Haji Gholami | Channel 5 |
| 2021 | Fereshtegan-e Bi Bal | Amirhossein Enayati | Channel 5 |
| 2021 | Mastand-e Abutaha | Seyed Abolfazl Sangesefidi | Channel 3 |
| 2021 | Afra | Behrang Tofighi | Channel 1 |
| 2021 | Moj-e Aval | Seyed Amirsajjad Hosseini | Channel 3 |
| 2021 | Barf-e Bisoda Mibarad | Pourya Azarbaijani | Channel 3 |
| 2022 | Atash-e Sard | Reza Aboofazeli | Channel 2 |
| 2022 | Gildokht | Majid Esmaeili | Channel 1 |
| 2023 | Bazpors | Ahmad Moazzami | Channel 1 |
| 2023 | Mahramaneh | Mahmoud Moazzami | Channel 3 |
| 2024 | Tooba | Saeed Soltani | Channel 1 |

=== Web ===
| Year | Title | Director |
|---|---|---|
| 2015 | Shahrzad 1 | Hassan Fathi |
| 2017 | Shahrzad 2 | Hassan Fathi |
| 2017 | Shahrzad 3 | Hassan Fathi |
| 2023 | Daftar-e Yaddasht | Kiarash Asadizadeh |

== Judging ==
- The 22nd Khorramshehr Conquest National Theater Festival
- The 20th Posta-Mehr National Theater Festival
- The Epic Narrators Festival

== Awards ==
- Winner of the Crystal Simorgh for Best Actress in Iranian Theater at the 34th Fajr Theater Festival
- Best Actress at the 34th International Fajr Theater Festival (2016)
