= Masoud Kimiai =

Iranian film director, screenwriter and producer (born 1941)

- مسعود کیمیایی
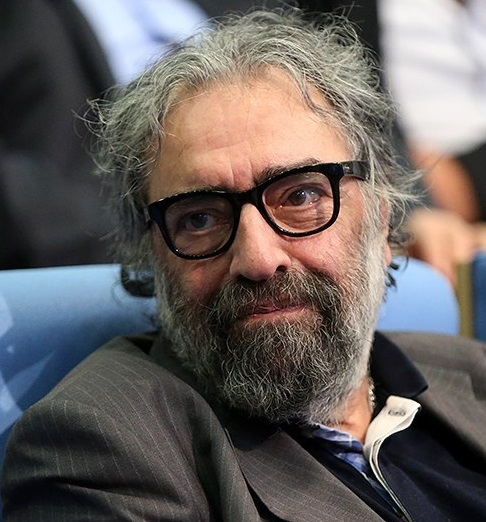
- Born: Masoud Kimiai; July 29, 1941 (age 84); Tehran, Iran
- Occupations: Film director Screenwriter
- Years active: 1968–present
- Spouses: Giti Pashaei (m. 1969; div. 1991) Googoosh (m. 1991; div. 2003)
- Children: Gilda and Poulad Kimiayi

Masoud Kimiai or Masoud Kimiaei, (Persian: مسعود کیمیایی, [mæˈsuːd kimiːˈʔiː]; born 29 July 1941) is an Iranian director, screenwriter and producer.

== Biography ==
Without any academic training in cinema or theater, and with only a few years of experience as assistant director, Kimiai became a historical figure in the Iranian cinema. He learned film making from the movies, and of his early days of contact with the cinema.

Kimiai started his career as an assistant director and made his debut, Come Stranger, in 1968. With his second film, Qeysar (also known as Qaiser and Gheisar) (1969), he and Dariush Mehrjui with the film The Cow, caused a historical change in Iranian film industry as the features that are considered the first films of the "Iranian New Wave". Qeysar became a great success at the box office and opened the way for young, talented filmmakers who never had a chance in the industry before.

His films deal with people at the margin of the society with his anti-hero characters that die at the end. Many directors of commercial films imitated his Qeysarin the next couple of years, but he later shifted his focus to young antagonists. He usually writes his screenplays, using slang dialogue based on ordinary traditional people's dialect, which has received attention alongside criticism from Iranians in its unrealistic nature.

In 1991, he was awarded a prize in 41st Berlin International Film Festival for his Snake Fang. This was not his sole international prize. At the Cairo International Film festival in 1979 he got from the International Catholic Organisation for Cinema (OCIC), the OCIC Prize for his film The Journey of the Stone. The international OCIC jury gave its award to this film because The Journey of the Stone denounced the exploitation of mankind by mankind and called for a more just social order.

He has been married three times. He was married to the late Iranian pop singer Giti Pashaei until 1991, afterwards he married the Iranian pop singer Googoosh.

== Filmography ==
- Come Stranger, 1968
- Qeysar, 1969
- Reza Motorcyclist(Motori) (film), 1970
- Dash Akol, 1971
- The Soil, 1973
- Baluch, 1972
- The Deer, 1974
- The Horse (short film)
- The Oriental Boy (short film), 1974
- Ghazal, 1976
- The Journey of the Stone, 1978
- The Red Line, 1982
- The Blade and the Silk, 1987
- The Lead, 1988
- Snake Fang, 1990
- The Sergeant, 1991
- The Wolf's Trail, 1992
- Fist, 1995
- Trade, 1995
- The Feast, 1996
- Mercedes, 1998
- Cry, 1999
- Complain, 2002
- Future Soldiers, 2004
- The Command, 2005
- The Boss, 2006
- Trial on the Street, 2009
- Crime, 2011
- Qeysar 40 years later (Documentary), 2011
- Metropole, 2014
- Domestic Killer, 2016
- Blood done, 2019
- Reverse, 2019
- There Was Blood, 2020
- Killing a Traitor, 2022

== Awards ==
- Nominated Crystal Simorgh Best Director Fajr International Film Festival 2000
- Winner Special Jury Prize Montreal World Film Festival 1992
- Honourable Mention 41st Berlin International Film Festival 1991
- Nominated Crystal Simorgh Best Trailer Fajr International Film Festival 1989
- OCIC International Catholic Organization for Cinema 1979
- Winner Award for Best Director Cairo International Film Festival 1979
- Winner Silver Medal International Filmfestival Mannheim-Heidelberg 1976
- Best Script Tashkent International Film Forum 1971
- Best Film and Writer Sepas Film Festival 1969
- Best Director Sepas Film Festival 1969

== Bibliography ==
- Jassadhaye Shishe-ei (Novel)
- Hassad Bar Zendegi Ein-al-Qozat (Novel)
- Zakhm Aql (Poetry)
