= List of awards and nominations received by Ebrahim Hatamikia =

Ebrahim Hatamikia awards and nominations
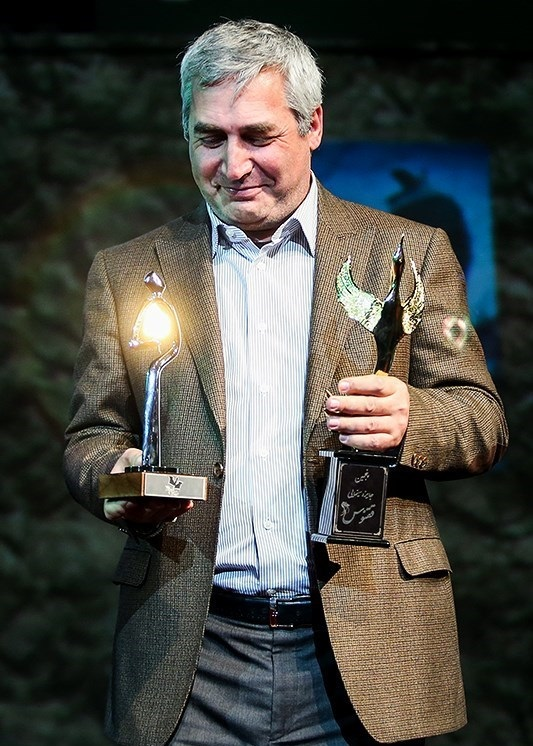
- Hatamikia receives Golden Phoenix and Golden Mirror awards for Bodyguard
Awards and nominations
Award	Wins	Nominations
Fajr International Film Festival	15	26
Iran Cinema Celebration	3	10
Iran's Film Critics and Writers Association	3	8

Totals (Note: Certain award groups do not simply award one winner. They acknowledge several different recipients, have runners-up, and have third place. Since this is a specific recognition and is different from losing an award, runner-up mentions are considered wins in this award tally. For simplification and to avoid errors, each award in this list has been presumed to have had a prior nomination.)
- Wins: 43
- Nominations: 85

This article is List of awards and nominations received by Iranian director and screenwriter Ebrahim Hatamikia.

Hatamikia has received several awards and honors through his career including 23 nominations for Crystal Simorgh which won 10 of them. The Bodyguard (2016) is the most nominated and most awarded film of him. His first was for The Path (1985), a short film which produced at early stages of his professional career. In addition to awards and nominations for directing and screenwriting, he has nominated for Best Supporting Actor at the 6th Iran's Film Critics and Writers Association Awards.

== Awards and nominations ==
Award	Year	Section	Category	Work(s)	Result	Ref.
Baghdad International Film Festival	2016	Drama Feature Films	Golden Palm for Best Film	Bodyguard	Won	
City International Film Festival	2017	Feature Films	Best Director	Bodyguard	Nominated	
Fajr International Film Festival	1985	Short Films	Crystal Simorgh for Best Short Film	The Path	DH.	
Fajr International Film Festival	1989	Iranian Competition	Crystal Simorgh for Best Screenplay	The Scout	Nominated	
Fajr International Film Festival	1989	Iranian Competition	Crystal Simorgh of Special Jury Prize	The Scout	Won	
Fajr International Film Festival	1990	Iranian Competition	Crystal Simorgh for Best Director	The Immigrant	Nominated	
Fajr International Film Festival	1990	Iranian Competition	Crystal Simorgh for Best Screenplay	The Immigrant	DH.	
Fajr International Film Festival	1993	Iranian Competition	Crystal Simorgh for Best Director	From Karkheh to Rhein	Nominated	
Fajr International Film Festival	1993	Iranian Competition	Crystal Simorgh for Best Screenplay	From Karkheh to Rhein	Nominated	
Fajr International Film Festival	1994	Iranian Competition	Crystal Simorgh for Best Director	The Green Ashes	Nominated	
Fajr International Film Festival	1998	Iranian Competition	Crystal Simorgh for Best Director	The Glass Agency	Won	
Fajr International Film Festival	1998	Iranian Competition	Crystal Simorgh for Best Screenplay	The Glass Agency	Won	
Fajr International Film Festival	1999	Iranian Competition	Crystal Simorgh for Best Director	The Red Ribbon	Nominated	
Fajr International Film Festival	1999	International Competition	Crystal Simorgh for Best Director	The Red Ribbon	Won	
Fajr International Film Festival	1999	Iran's Bests from 1979	Best "Sacred Defense cinema" Film	From Karkheh to Rhein	Won	
Fajr International Film Festival	1999	Iran's Bests from 1979	Best Political Film	The Glass Agency	Won	
Fajr International Film Festival	2002	Iranian Competition	Crystal Simorgh for Best Director	Low Heights	Nominated	
Fajr International Film Festival	2006	Iranian Competition	Crystal Simorgh for Best Film (Note: Co-produced with Mohammad Pirhadi)	In the Name of the Father	Won	
Fajr International Film Festival	2006	Iranian Competition	Crystal Simorgh for Best Director	In the Name of the Father	Nominated	
Fajr International Film Festival	2006	Iranian Competition	Crystal Simorgh for Best Screenplay	In the Name of the Father	DH.	
Fajr International Film Festival	2006	International Competition	Crystal Simorgh for Best Film (Asia sub-section)	In the Name of the Father	Won	
Fajr International Film Festival	2010	Iranian Competition	Crystal Simorgh for Best Director	In Amethyst Color	Won	
Fajr International Film Festival	2010	Iranian Competition	Crystal Simorgh for Best Screenplay	In Amethyst Color	Nominated	
Fajr International Film Festival	2010	Iranian Competition	Crystal Simorgh of Special Jury Prize	In Amethyst Color	Nominated	
Fajr International Film Festival	2010	International Competition	Crystal Simorgh for Best Screenplay	In Amethyst Color	Won	
Fajr International Film Festival	2014	Iranian Competition	Crystal Simorgh for Best Director	Che	Nominated	
Fajr International Film Festival	2014	International Competition	Interfaith Award	Che	Won	
Fajr International Film Festival	2018	Contending for Simorgh	Crystal Simorgh for Best Director	Damascus Time	Won (Note: Along with Bahram Tavakoli for Directing of The Lost Strait)	
Hafez Awards	1999	—	Best Director	The Red Ribbon	Nominated	
Hafez Awards	1999	—	Best Screenplay	The Red Ribbon	Nominated	
Hafez Awards	2002	Cinema	Best Director	Low Heights	Nominated	
Hafez Awards	2002	Cinema	Best Screenplay (Note: Co-written with Asghar Farhadi)	Low Heights	Nominated	
Hafez Awards	2011	Cinema	Best Director	In Amethyst Color	Nominated	
Hafez Awards	2016	Cinema	Best Director	Bodyguard	Nominated	
Hafez Awards	2018	Cinema	Best Director	Damascus Time	Nominated	
Iran Cinema Celebration	1998	Feature Films	Golden Statuette for Best Director	The Glass Agency	Won	
Iran Cinema Celebration	1999	Feature Films	Golden Statuette for Best Director	The Red Ribbon	Nominated	
Iran Cinema Celebration	2002	Feature Films	Golden Statuette for Best Director	Low Heights	Won	
Iran Cinema Celebration	2002	Feature Films	Golden Statuette for Best Screenplay	Low Heights	Nominated	
Iran Cinema Celebration	2002	Feature Films	Film Critics and Writers Association's Choice	Low Heights	Nominated	
Iran Cinema Celebration	2002	Feature Films	House of Cinema's Choice (Note: Jointly nomination for Hatamikia as director and Manouchehr Mohammadi as producer.)	Low Heights	Won (Note: Along with Manijeh Hekmat and Sirus Taslimi for directing and producing of Women's Prison)	
Iran Cinema Celebration	2008	Feature Films	Golden Statuette for Best Director	Invitation	Nominated	
Iran Cinema Celebration	2008	Feature Films	Golden Statuette for Best Screenplay (Note: Co-written with Chista Yasrebi)	Invitation	Nominated	
Iran Cinema Celebration	2016	Feature Films	Golden Statuette for Best Director	Bodyguard	Nominated	
Iran Cinema Celebration	2018	Feature Films	Golden Statuette for Best Director	Damascus Time	Nominated	
Iran's Film Critics and Writers Association	2008	Iran's Recent 30 Years	Best "Sacred Defense cinema" Filmmaker	—	Won	
Iran's Film Critics and Writers Association	2011	Feature Films	Best Director	In Amethyst Color	Won	
Iran's Film Critics and Writers Association	2011	Feature Films	Best Screenplay	In Amethyst Color	Nominated	
Iran's Film Critics and Writers Association	2013	Feature Films	Best Supporting Actor	The Private Life of Mr. & Mrs. M	Nominated	
Iran's Film Critics and Writers Association	2014	Feature Films	Best Director	Che	Nominated	
Iran's Film Critics and Writers Association	2016	Feature Films	Best Director	Bodyguard	Nominated	
Iran's Film Critics and Writers Association	2016	Feature Films	Special Jury Award for Directing	Bodyguard	Won	
Iran's Film Critics and Writers Association	2018	Feature Films	Best Director	Damascus Time	Nominated	
IRIB TV Festival	2003	A-Grade Series	Best Director	The Red Soil	Won	
London Iranian Film Festival	2016	—	Audience Choice awards	Bodyguard	1st	
Mar del Plata International Film Festival	2003	International Competition	Golden Astor for Best Film	Low Heights	Nominated	
Mirror Award	2016	Feature Films	Golden Mirror for Best Film	Bodyguard	Won	
Phoenix Award	2016	Feature Films	Golden Phoenix for Best Film	Bodyguard	Won	
Phoenix Award	2018	Feature Films	Golden Phoenix for Best Film	Damascus Time	Won	
Resistance International Film Festival	1990	Feature Films	Best Film	The Scout	Won	
Resistance International Film Festival	1990	Feature Films	Best Director	The Scout and The Immigrant	Won	
Resistance International Film Festival	1992	Feature Films	Best Screenplay	Union of the Good	DH.	
Resistance International Film Festival	1994	Feature Films	Best Director	From Karkheh to Rhein	Nominated	
Resistance International Film Festival	1994	Feature Films	Best Screenplay	From Karkheh to Rhein	DH.	
Resistance International Film Festival	1996	Feature Films	Best Director	Minoo Watchtower	Nominated	
Resistance International Film Festival	1996	Feature Films	Best Screenplay	The Scent of Joseph's Shirt	Nominated	
Resistance International Film Festival	1998	Feature Films	Best Director	The Glass Agency	Nominated	
Resistance International Film Festival	1998	Feature Films	Best Screenplay	The Glass Agency	Nominated	
Resistance International Film Festival	1998	Feature Films	Special Jury Award	The Glass Agency	Won	
Resistance International Film Festival	2000	20 Years Cinema	Four Major "Sacred Defense cinema" Filmmakers	—	2nd	
Resistance International Film Festival	2005	Overall	Five Best "Sacred Defense cinema" Filmmakers	—	1st	
Resistance International Film Festival	2010	"Sacred Defense"	3 Best Directors	The Glass Agency	1st	
Resistance International Film Festival	2010	"Sacred Defense"	3 Best Screenplays	The Glass Agency	1st	
Resistance International Film Festival	2014	Iranian Feature Films	Best Director	Che	Won	
Resistance International Film Festival	2014	Iranian Feature Films	Best Screenplay	Che	Nominated	
Resistance International Film Festival	2014	International Feature Films	Special Jury Award	Che	Won	
Resistance International Film Festival	2016	Iranian Feature Films	Best Director	Bodyguard	Won	
Resistance International Film Festival	2016	Iranian Feature Films	Best Screenplay	Bodyguard	Nominated	
Resistance International Film Festival	2016	Martyr-families' Choice	Best Work	Bodyguard	Won	
Resistance International Film Festival	2018	40 Years Cinema	Best Director	—	Won (Note: Along with Masoud Dehnamaki and Rasoul Mollagholipour)	
Resistance International Film Festival	2018	40 Years Cinema	Best Screenwriter	—	Won (Note: Along with Narges Abyar and Mohammad-Hossein Mahdavian)	
San Sebastián International Film Festival	1999	—	Golden Shell for Best Picture	The Red Ribbon	Nominated	
VIFF Vienna Independent Film Festival	2017	—	Golden Statuette for Best Feature Film	Bodyguard	Nominated	
VIFF Vienna Independent Film Festival	2017	—	Golden Statuette for Best Director	Bodyguard	Won	
VIFF Vienna Independent Film Festival	2017	—	Golden Statuette for Best Art Direction	Bodyguard	Won	

== Most awards and nominations ==
Most nominations for
Nominations	Film
15	Bodyguard
9	The Glass Agency
8	Low Heights
7	In Amethyst Color
6	The Red Ribbon
6	Che

Most awards for
Wins	Film
9	Bodyguard
7	The Glass Agency
