= Ebrahim Hatamikia =

Iranian screenwriter and film director

- ابراهیم حاتمی‌کیا
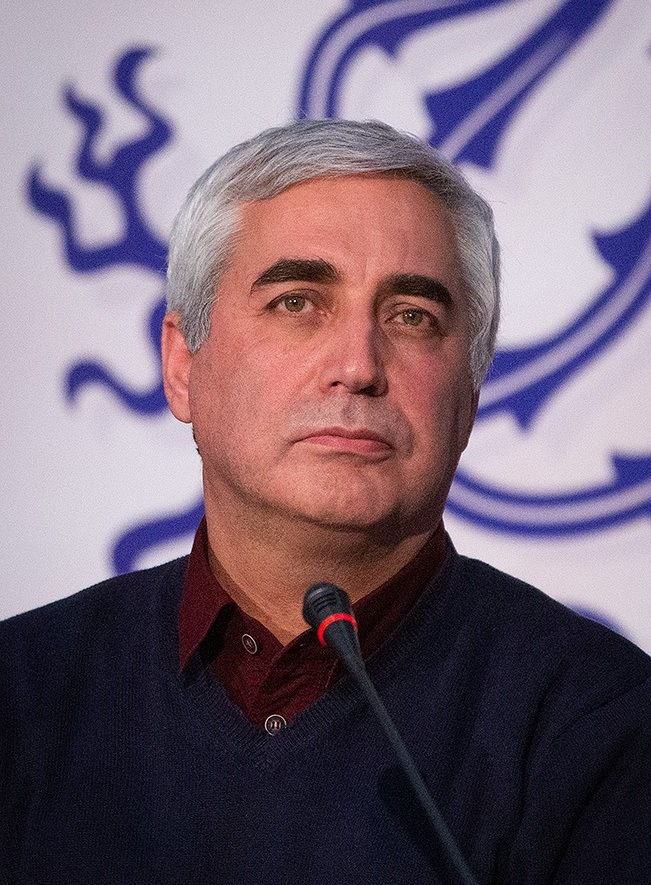
- Hatamikia in Fajr International Film Festival 2020
- Born: 23 September 1961 (age 65); Tehran, Iran
- Education: Screenwriting
- Alma mater: Tehran University of Art
- Occupations: Film director, screenwriter, cinematographer and actor
- Years active: 1979–present
- Children: Nayereh; Yousef; Esmaeil
- Awards: Full list
- Military career
- Allegiance: Iran
- Branch: Revolutionary Guards
- Service years: 1980s
- Unit: Audiovisual unit
- Conflicts: Iran–Iraq War

Ebrahim Hatamikia (Persian: ابراهیم حاتمی‌کیا, romanized: Ebrāhīm Ḥātamīkīā; born 23 September 1961) is an Iranian film director, screenwriter, cinematographer and actor. Hatamikia is a prolific proponent of films depicting the Iran–Iraq War's impact on Iran. His films are considered some of the best ever made in the genre of Iranian war cinema, and are notable for their attention to social changes brought about by the war. He is known for his explorations of the trauma by the war, both on returning soldiers and those who await them, unable to mourn effectively without knowing the fate of their loved ones.

== Career ==
Ebrahim Hatamikia is among of the filmmakers of the new generation of the cinema of Iran after Iranian Revolution, who is internationally renowned for his role in the cinema of Iran in the 1990s. He was born in 1961 in Tehran to a Persian father and Azeri mother. He began his directing career with some short films and documentaries about the Iran–Iraq War. His movies are considered to be the best that tackle the war and the issues surrounding it. His works have often received admiration in national film festivals. The Glass Agency and In the Name of the Father have won him the best screenplay and directing awards in the sixteenth and twenty-fourth Fajr International Film Festival respectively.

I truly did not come to the war from cinema; rather,
I discovered cinema through being in the war.

— Ebrahim Hatamikia

Hatamikia is now considered as an icon of professional religious filmmakers in Iran. His name was heard for the first time in the short films section of the 3rd Fajr International Film Festival. The Path (1985) received honors and was recognized by the jury for excellence in presenting a theme related to the war. Hatamikia's early war-related features The Scout (1989) and The Immigrant (1990) explored the psychological and sociological impact of the war on the home front. In his subsequent glossy feature From Karkheh to Rhein (1993), he explored the psychology of a disabled veteran on a medical trip to Germany, adding to the war theme the tension of the direct contact with the West and of displacement to foreign lands. From Karkheh to Rhein considered as an anti-war film. Hatamikia in From Karkheh to Rhein and The Glass Agency have depicted the complex processes of re-integration and re-assimilation, particularly for veterans who were chemically injured or suffered chronic illnesses. The two are particularly praised by Hezbollahi citizens in Iran. Hatamikia's From Karkheh to Rhein is particularly interesting in connection with the discourse of the Iranian diaspora during the war.

The Glass Agency (1998) portrayed the feelings and life conditions of those who expunged from the public sphere and lost out from Rafsanjani's neoliberalisation. It tells the story of two former soldiers which despite enduring sacrifices by participating in the war, did not enjoy any of the material rewards coming from post-war reconstruction, and had criticized the government's hypocrisy of turning veterans into symbolic heroes but not actually caring for them. By the film, Hatamikia had provoked the government, which then took him to court over the film and barred its release for a while. The Glass Agency is a metaphor for the glass house that Iran became after the war, where internal conflicts have been more salient than international ones. As Esha Momeni noted, it seems that Hatamikia is criticizing the state for that issue, however martyrdom's glorification by him, continues to serve the state by covering up its deficiencies in the post-war era. As Hamid Naficy notes, the film deals with the crisis of reintegrating war veterans into a society that nearly a decade after the war's end seems apathetic to their plight. in addition to criticize the government, it critiques society, which revered the soldiers but now wants to get on with life.

In Amethyst Color (2005) was banned from screening by the order of the Ministry of Intelligence because the film depicts the image of a security official. His other film, Dead Wave (2001), was also prohibited from screening by the demand of military officials. However, both films were later screened in Iranian cinemas. Despite the IRGC's strong footprint on post-revolutionary cinema, many of Iran's most important directors such as Ebrahim Hatamikia, Rasoul Mollagholipour, Mojtaba Ra'i, and Ahmad-Reza Darvish, who were products of this system of support, have increasingly moved away from the war movies promoted by the IRGC. The situation has reached a point where an important war movie director, Ebrahim Hatamikia publicly criticizes the interference of military personnel in cultural and artistic activities. He talked about this in the press conference for his new film Dead Wave, which has yet to be released despite the fact that it was produced by Ravayat-e Fath Foundation. In fact, reportedly the producer prevented the movie, which is about a military commander obsessed with attacking an American warship who also has problems with his son, from being screened. A very high quality video of this movie was however widely and illegally distributed.

== Cinematic style ==
As of Richard Peña, The Red Ribbon (1999) reminds a bit of some of the later absurdist dramas by Fernando Arrabal. It is a dense and highly metaphoric drama involving three characters and set in a tank graveyard in the no-man's-land between Iran and Iraq. He aspires to the technical sophistication of Hollywood.

Hatamikia was one of the few war filmmakers with a previous background in Super 8 and animated film production who joined Jihad's Television unit and the IRGC's Audiovisual unit in 1986. He uses the war and its extreme situations as a vehicle to negotiate camouflaged taboo topics. In From Karkheh to Rheine a few veterans doubt about their participation in the war. The television series The Red Soil (2002–2003) momentarily exposes the absurdity of the concept of the nation as a homogeneous entity, with depiction of the confusion around which side of the border belongs on during the Iraqi occupation while portrays in-between spaces of an Iranian Arab and an Iraqi Arab.

His films brilliantly deal with the different and unexpected types of returns. Through the image of exiles seen in From Karkheh to Rhein and The Scent of Joseph's Shirt, Roxanne Varzi notes that the audience come to understand the international scope of the war, and that what binds a nation is so much more than land. Hatamikia believes none Iranian could escape the mark of war, by virtue of association. Therefore, every Iranian takes part in the act of mourning. His films open a new and safe realm for mourning through presenting the nation with its death in a beautiful and artistic way. Aftermore, by influences of Morteza Avini in The Chronicles of Victory (1986–1988) war documentary television series, Hatamikia depicts returning from the imaginary realm through the very visual realm that made that journey possible. At the same time that these films reinstate the importance of faith, they stress the importance of remaining in the realm of the real, with those who are still with us. In The Glass Agency, he envisages martyrdom as the only possible and proper ending for a war veteran. He draw on the themes of the Karbala paradigm, specially martyrdom and self-sacrifice, and employs elements of the Ta'ziyeh. The concept of Mostaz'af is present in his films.

In particular, Hatamikia's melodramas have been the hallmark of war films after Morteza Avini's films of the Sacred Defense. Hatamikia's films centered on the trauma of war veterans and the destitute lives they have lived in the post-war period, while Avini's films promoted the heroism of soldiers and the necessity of fighting for the Islamic Republic, however both directors have upheld a somber vision of the war hero.

Even though the war cinema addresses the ideological, charismatic and populist characteristics of the political system, these are raised in the context of war, not as political criticism. In effect these films belong to the war genre rather than a political genre. Because of the agitated political atmosphere of the country, many films were considered political. This was because people were searching for symbolism when analyzing these films. Ebrahim Hatamikia shot From Karkheh to Rhine in Germany, a country in the West. The film is a call for reunion, for the return of women who have been alienated by the Revolution, especially those who have physically left home for the West. In this film, the split between men and women — in this case brother and sister — and the cultural space between them are shown by the different countries in which they live. The westernized sister has to be reconciled with her radical religious Iranian brother. the film was a powerful indictment of the failures of the state to honour its soldiers. Though highly acclaimed by Adineh and other art magazines, Kayhan was quick to denounce the film as yet another example of failure of the cinema to mark the successes and glories of the war. The paper warned its readers about the new immoral trend and noted that yet again the Ministry of Culture and Islamic Guidance was at fault; its cinema section had provided a $1 million budget for the film.

The Scent of Joseph's Shirt (1996) is Hatamikia's first female-centric film. The female characters in Hatamikia's films usually have a visible presence even though they may not be the main characters.

The war era has become the theme of many films, with some of them representing the situation of cities in the wartime. Hatamikia in Union of the Good (1992) portrays the general image of Tehran as a quiet city that turned to a location of a rocket war and sometimes this calmness and quietness breaks with the sound of ambulances and fire-fighting alarms.

== Recognition ==
Hatamikia is one of the most notable members of a group of Iranian filmmakers who experienced the Iran-Iraq War and one of the first Basij filmmakers that took a critical look at post-war Iran by portraying the disillusionment of war veterans and their treatment by both secular society and the government that reneged on its promises. His films appeal to a broad audience because they delicately tread the thin line between what many secular Iranians define as typical Basij government propaganda and the secular anti-government sentiment. In so doing, his films have allowed a space for Iranians to begin to think about and debate the war. Also, they have encouraged a generation of young Iranians to rethink the war and revolutionary values in general.

His ability to translate an American film scenario for an Iranian audience and make it look like the Iran-Iraq war points to the universality of war, is an issue overlooked by film critics. However, The Glass Agency (1998) was dismissed by American critics as nothing more than an attempt to make an Iranian version of Dog Day Afternoon (Sidney Lumet, 1975), Hatamikia went on to make other imitations, like The Red Ribbon (1999), which looks a lot like The English Patient (Anthony Minghella, 1996).

== Political views ==
He criticized assassination attempt of the reformist Saeed Hajjarian by writing an open letter to the nation.

== Filmography ==
Key
†	Denotes films that have not yet been released

=== As director ===
==== Short films ====
Title	Year	Credited as		Notes	Ref(s)
Title	Year	Writer	Other	Notes	Ref(s)
The Promised	1982 (Note: Product year. The film was not screened.)	Yes	—N/a	Animation film	
Proud's Sequel	1982	Yes	—N/a		
Blinds of Heart	1982	Yes	—N/a		
Sacred Soil	1985 (Note: Premiere year on Gregorian calendar. Note that in Cinema of Iran, production year of each film on Solar Hijri calendar is considered as specific year of that film, which is a Gregorian year before the date showed here.)	Yes	No		
The Path	1985	Yes	No		
The Red Carcanet	1986	Yes	Yes	Also cinematographer	

==== Feature films ====
Title	Year	Credited as		Notes	Ref(s)
Title	Year	Writer	Other	Notes	Ref(s)
Identity	1987	Yes	No		
The Scout	1989	Yes	No		
The Immigrant	1990	Yes	No		
Union of the God	1992	Yes	No		
From Karkheh to Rhein	1993	Yes	No		
The Green Ashes	1994	Yes	No		
The Scent of Joseph's Shirt	1996	Yes	Yes	Cameo	
Minoo Watchtower	1996	Yes	No		
The Glass Agency	1998	Yes	No		
The Red Ribbon	1999	Yes	No		
Dead Wave	2001	Yes	No		
Low Heights	2002	Yes	No	Co-written with Asghar Farhadi	
In Amethyst Color	2005	Yes	Yes	Co-edited with Sohrab Khosravi	
In the Name of the Father	2006	Yes	Yes	Co-produced with Mohammad Pirhadi	
Invitation	2008 (Note: The film premiered on the same Gregorian year which the film was produced on it.)	Yes	Yes	Cameo; co-written with Chista Yasrebi	
The Report of a Party	2011	Yes	No		
Che	2014	Yes	No		
Bodyguard	2016	Yes	Yes	Cameo	
Damascus Time	2018	Yes	No		
Exodus	2020	Yes	No		
Moses the Kalimullah: At Dawn	2025	Yes	Yes		

==== TV series ====
Title	Credited as		Original air date	Network	Ref(s)
Title	Writer	Other	Original air date	Network	Ref(s)
The Red Soil	No	No	25 September 2002 – 15 January 2003	IRIB TV1	
The Green Ring	Yes	No	20 October 2007 – 23 February 2008	IRIB TV3	
Moses the Kalimullah	Yes	Yes			

=== Other works ===
==== Short films ====
Title	Year	Credited as	Director(s)	Notes	Ref(s)
Arise	1984	Cinematographer	Nosratollah Karimi	Documentary film	
Fátima	1995	Cinematographer	—N/a	Documentary film	
The Glass Meeting	2017	Producer, Screenwriter	Yousef Hatamikia		

==== Feature films ====
Title	Year	Credited as	Director(s)	Notes	Ref(s)
Paranoia	1986	Camera Assistant	Saeed Hajimiri	Cameo	
Transition	1989	Producer	Kamal Tabrizi		
The Love Squadron	1998	Screenwriter	Saeed Hajimiri	Co-written with Saeed Hajimiri	
The Private Life of Mr. & Mrs. M	2012	Actor	Rouhollah Hejazi		
The Eye of War	2016	Producer	Yousef Hatamikia, Mehdi Borjian	Documentary film	

==== TV series ====
Title	Year	Credited as	Director(s)	Notes	Network	Ref(s)
The Chronicles of Victory	1987	Cinematographer	Morteza Avini	S04E05: "Magic or miracle?" Co-photographed with Hassan Pirhadi	IRIB TV1	
The Chronicles of Victory	1988	Cinematographer	Morteza Avini	S05E10: "Another shine (1)"	IRIB TV1	
The Chronicles of Victory	1988	Cinematographer	Morteza Avini, Himself	S05E11: "Another shine (2): Mr. Saeid"	IRIB TV1	
Oil's Journey	2000	Cinematographer, Screenwriter	Ebrahim Asgharzadeh	Documentary series in 13 episodes Co-Written with Ebrahim Asgharzadeh	Sahar TV	
Kolah Ghermezi 88	2009	Actor	Iraj Tahmasb	Himself at episode 7	IRIB TV2	

=== Documentary appearances ===
Title	Year	Director(s)	Notes	Ref(s)
The Chronology of An Unfinished Script	1999	Ebrahim Asgharzadeh	Dead Wave making-of	
Friendly Persuasion: Iranian Cinema After the 1979 Revolution	2000	Jamsheed Akrami		
Voice of Golich Valley	2004	Ali-Mohammad Ghasemi		
Iran: A Cinematographic Revolution	2006	Nader Takmil Homayoun		
Heart-dependent	2007	Omid Najvan	The Glass Agency making-of	
The Green Route	2008	Omid Najvan	The Green Ring making-of	
The Red Ribbon	2009	Reza 'Atefi	The Red Ribbon making-of	
Mud-Brick and Mirrors	2009	Shadmehr Rastin		
Root in the Soil	2010	Mohammad Khalilzadeh		
Wild Ducks	2015	Yousef Hatamikia	The Report of a Party making-of	
Gohar Kheirandish: A Filmography	2015	Pouria Heidary Oureh		
Ebrahim's Dream	2017	Mahmoud Karimi	Che making-of	
Ebrahim's Rushes	2018	—N/a	His works' making-of in 13 episodes	
The Robin †	2020	Sajjad Imani		

== Footnotes ==
=== Sources ===
- Abecassis, Michaël (May 2011). "Iranian War Cinema: Between Reality and Fiction". Iranian Studies. 44 (3): 387–394. doi:10.1080/00210862.2011.556390. S2CID 162722028.
- Akrami, Jamsheed (1992). "CINEMA ii. Feature Films". In Yarshater, Ehsan (ed.). Encyclopædia Iranica. Vol. 5. Encyclopaedia Iranica Foundation. pp. 572–579. ISBN 0933273673.
- ASL19 (2014). "Censorship in Iranian Cinema". In Decherney, Peter; Atwood, Blake (eds.). Iranian Cinema in a Global Context: Policy, Politics, and Form. Abingdon, Oxon: Routledge. pp. 229–242. ISBN 9781315771373.
- Bajoghli, Narges (2019). Iran Reframed: Anxieties of Power in the Islamic Republic. Stanford: Stanford University Press. ISBN 9781503608849.
- Behrouzan, Orkideh (December 2015). "Medicalization as a way of life: The Iran-Iraq War and considerations for psychiatry and anthropology". Medicine Anthropology Theory. 2 (3): 40–60. doi:10.17157/mat.2.3.199. Archived from the original on 13 February 2020.
- Devictor, Agnès (2012). "How Can Faith Be Filmed on the Battlefront and Experienced by TV Spectators?". In Khosronejad, Pedram (ed.). Iranian Sacred Defense Cinema: Religion, Martyrdom and National Identity. Canon Pyon: Sean Kingston Publishing. pp. 161–173. ISBN 978-1907774171.
- Esfandiary, Shahab (2012). Iranian Cinema and Globalization: National, Transnational, and Islamic Dimensions. Bristol: Intellect. ISBN 9781841504704.
- Farhi, Farideh (2004). "The Antinomies of Iran's War Generation". In Potter, Lawrence G.; Sick, Gary G. (eds.). Iran, Iraq, and the Legacies of War. New York: Palgrave Macmillan. pp. 101–120. ISBN 9781349958221.
- Fischer, Michael M. J. (2004). Mute Dreams, Blind Owls, and Dispersed Knowledges: Persian Poesis in the Transnational Circuitry. Durham: Duke University Press. ISBN 0822385511.
- Ghanoonparvar, M. R. (Fall 2009). "Postrevolutionary Trends in Persian Fiction and Film". Radical History Review. 2009 (105): 156–162. doi:10.1215/01636545-2009-013.
- Ghorbankarimi, Maryam (2015). A Colourful Presence: The Evolution of Women's Representation in Iranian Cinema. Newcastle upon Tyne: Cambridge Scholars Publishing. ISBN 978-1443882729.
- Ginsberg, Terri; Lippard, Chris (2010). Historical Dictionary of Middle Eastern Cinema. Lanham, Maryland: Scarecrow Press. ISBN 978-0810873643.
- Goharipour, Hamed (2016). "A Review of Urban Images of Tehran in the Iranian Post-revolution Cinema". In Arefian, Fatemeh Farnaz; Moeini, Seyed Hossein Iradj (eds.). Urban Change in Iran: Stories of Rooted Histories and Ever-accelerating Developments. Heidelberg: Springer. pp. 47–57. ISBN 9783319261133.
- Haghighi, Ali Reza (2002). "Politics and Cinema in Post-revolutionary Iran: An Uneasy Relationship". In Tapper, Richard (ed.). The New Iranian Cinema Politics, Representation, and Identity. I.B. Tauris. pp. 109–116. ISBN 1860648045.
- Jahed, Parviz, ed. (2012). Directory of World Cinema: Iran. Vol. 1. Bristol: Intellect. ISBN 9781841503998.
- Keddie, Nikki R.; Richard, Yann (2003). Modern Iran: Roots and Results of Revolution (2nd ed.). Yale University Press. ISBN 9780300121056.
- Kim, Somy (2014). "Comedic Mediations: War and Genre in The Outcasts". In Devi, Gayatri; Rahman, Najat (eds.). Humor in Middle Eastern Cinema. Detroit: Wayne State University Press. ISBN 9780814339374.
- Lotfalian, Mazyar (Fall 2009). "Islamic Revolution and the Circulation of Visual Culture". Radical History Review. 2009 (105): 163–167. doi:10.1215/01636545-2009-014.
- Moallem, Minoo (2016). "Revisiting the Mostaz'af and the Mostakbar". In Bhavnani, Kum-Kum; Foran, John; Kurian, Priya A.; Munshi, Debashish (eds.). Feminist Futures: Reimagining Women, Culture and Development (2nd ed.). London: Zed Books. pp. 344–365. ISBN 9781783606412.
- Moallem, Minoo (2018). "Staging Masculinity in Iran–Iraq War Movies". In Magnan-Park, Aaron Han Joon; Marchetti, Gina; Tan, See Kam (eds.). The Palgrave Handbook of Asian Cinema. London: Palgrave Macmillan. pp. 489–506. ISBN 9781349958221.
- Momeni, Esha (June 2019). "Red Death and Black Life: Media, Martyrdom and Shame". Middle East Critique. 28 (2): 177–195. doi:10.1080/19436149.2019.1599538. S2CID 182597406.
- Naficy, Hamid (2001). "Iranian cinema". In Leaman, Oliver (ed.). Companion Encyclopedia of Middle Eastern and North African Film. London: Routledge. pp. 130–222. ISBN 0415187036.
- Naficy, Hamid (2012). A Social History of Iranian Cinema, Volume 4: The Globalizing Era, 1984–2010. Durham: Duke University Press. ISBN 9780822348665.
- Omid, Homa (1994). Islam and the Post-Revolutionary State in Iran. London: Macmillan Press. ISBN 9781349232482.
- Peña, Richard (May–June 1999). "Being There". Film Comment. 35 (3): 70–71. JSTOR 43455394.
- Rahbaran, Shiva (2016). Iranian Cinema Uncensored: Contemporary Film-makers Since the Islamic Revolution. I.B. Tauris. ISBN 9781784534172.
- Rastegar, Kamran (2010). "The Glass Agency: Iranian War Veterans as Heroes or Traitors?". In Thiranagama, Sharika; Kelly, Tobias (eds.). Traitors: Suspicion, Intimacy, and the Ethics of State-Building. Philadelphia: University of Pennsylvania Press. pp. 188–199. ISBN 9780812205893.
- Rastegar, Kamran (2015). Surviving Images: Cinema, War, and Cultural Memory in the Middle East. Oxford University Press. ISBN 9780199390175.
- Riahi, Marjan (2016). "Shadows of War: An Overview of Iranian War Films from 1980 to 1988". In Khakpour, Arta; Khorrami, Mohammad Mehdi; Vatanabadi, Shouleh (eds.). Moments of Silence: Authenticity in the Cultural Expressions of the Iran-Iraq War, 1980–1988. New York: New York University Press. pp. 176–189. ISBN 9781479805099.
- Rivetti, Paola (2020). Political Participation in Iran from Khatami to the Green Movement. Cham, Switzerland: Palgrave Macmillan. ISBN 9783030322007.
- Sadr, Hamid Reza (1999). "Contemporary Iranian Cinema and Its Major Themes". In Issa, Rose; Whitaker, Sheila (eds.). Life and Art: The New Iranian Cinema. London: British Film Institute. pp. 26–43. ISBN 0851707750.
- Sadr, Hamid Reza (2006). Iranian Cinema: A Political History. London: I.B. Tauris. ISBN 9780415455374.
- Saeed-Vafa, Mehrnaz (2002). "Location (Physical Space) and Cultural Identity in Iranian Films". In Tapper, Richard (ed.). The New Iranian Cinema Politics, Representation, and Identity. I.B. Tauris. pp. 200–214. ISBN 1860648045.
- Saeidi, Shirin; Vafa, Amirhossein (June 2019). "After Isolation: Mirrors between Parallel Worlds and New Conceptual Spaces of Activism in Post-Revolutionary Iran". Millennium. 47 (3): 417–443. doi:10.1177/0305829819840800. S2CID 181896831.
- Strohmaier, Alena (2019). Medienraum Diaspora: Verortungen zeitgenössischer iranischer Diaspora filme. Neue Perspektiven der Medienästhetik (in German). Wiesbaden: Springer. doi:10.1007/978-3-658-24606-8. ISBN 978-3-658-24605-1. S2CID 166098004.
- Varzi, Roxanne (2002). "A Ghost in the Machine: The Cinema of the Iranian Sacred Defence". In Tapper, Richard (ed.). The New Iranian Cinema Politics, Representation, and Identity. I.B. Tauris. pp. 154–166. ISBN 1860648045.
- Varzi, Roxanne (2006). Warring Souls: Youth, Media, and Martyrdom in Post-Revolution Iran. Durham: Duke University Press. ISBN 9780822388036.
- Wittmann, Matthias (June–July 2015). "Krieg und Revolution im Kino des Iran: Eine Telescopage". Mittelweg 36 (in German). 24 (3): 64–83. ISSN 0941-6382.
- Zeydabadi-Nejad, Saeed (2008). "Iranian Intellectuals and Contact with the West: The Case of Iranian Cinema". In Ridgeon, Lloyd (ed.). Iranian Intellectuals: 1997–2007. Abingdon, Oxon: Routledge. pp. 115–138. ISBN 978-0415443289.
- Zeydabadi-Nejad, Saeed (2009). The Politics of Iranian Cinema: Film and Society in the Islamic Republic. Abingdon, Oxon: Routledge. ISBN 9780415455374.
