= Sacred Defense cinema =

Iranian film genre

Holy Defense cinema (Persian: سینمای دفاع مقدس, romanized: Sīnimā-yi Difā'-i Muqaddas) refers to a genre of Iranian films that deals with various aspects of the Iran-Iraq war of 1980–1988. Although little noticed in the West, the genre has produced more than 200 movies, including some critical and commercial hits. Some of Iran's most noted directors have engaged with the genre, among them Ebrahim Hatamikia, Mohsen Makhmalbaf, Majid Majidi and Kamal Tabrizi. Hatamikia is one of the most prolific and successful proponents of the genre.

In 2007, Iranian war cinema retrospectives were curated by Pedram Khosronejad and held in New York and at the Barbican Centre in London. The first comprehensive academic study in the West was published in 2012: Iranian Holy Defence Cinema: Religion, Martyrdom and National Identity by Khosronejad.

== Notable directors ==
- Ebrahim Hatamikia
- Mohammad Bozorgnia
- Rasoul Mollagholipour
- Shahriar Bahrani
- Ahmad Reza Darvish
- Mohsen Makhmalbaf
- Abolqasem Talebi
- Kamal Tabrizi

== Notable films ==
- The 5th Kilometer, 1980
- Jan-bazan, 1981
- A Military Base in Hell, 1982
- Hesar, 1983
- Rahaei, 1983
- Two Blind Eyes, 1983
- A Boat to the Beach, 1984
- Land of Lovers, 1984
- Eagles, 1984
- The First Bell, 1984
- We Are Standing, 1984
- The Flag Bearer, 1985
- Passage, 1986
- Identity, 1987
- Man and Weapon, 1988
- Horizon, 1989
- Transition, 1989
- Snake Fang, 1989
- The Scout, 1989
- Bashu, the Little Stranger, 1990
- The Immigrant, 1990
- The Sergeant, 1991
- Union of the Good, 1992
- The Abadanis, 1993
- From Karkheh to Rhein, 1993
- Journey to Chazabeh, 1996

== Sources ==
- Minuchehr, Pardis (August 2014). "Pedram Khosronejad, ed. Iranian Sacred Defence Cinema: Religion, Martyrdom and National Identity (Canon Pyon, U.K.: Sean Kingston Publishing, 2012). Pp. 213. $110.00 cloth". International Journal of Middle East Studies. 46 (3): 631–633. doi:10.1017/S0020743814000804. ISSN 0020-7438. JSTOR 43303206.
