= The Passage (Iranian film) =

Passage
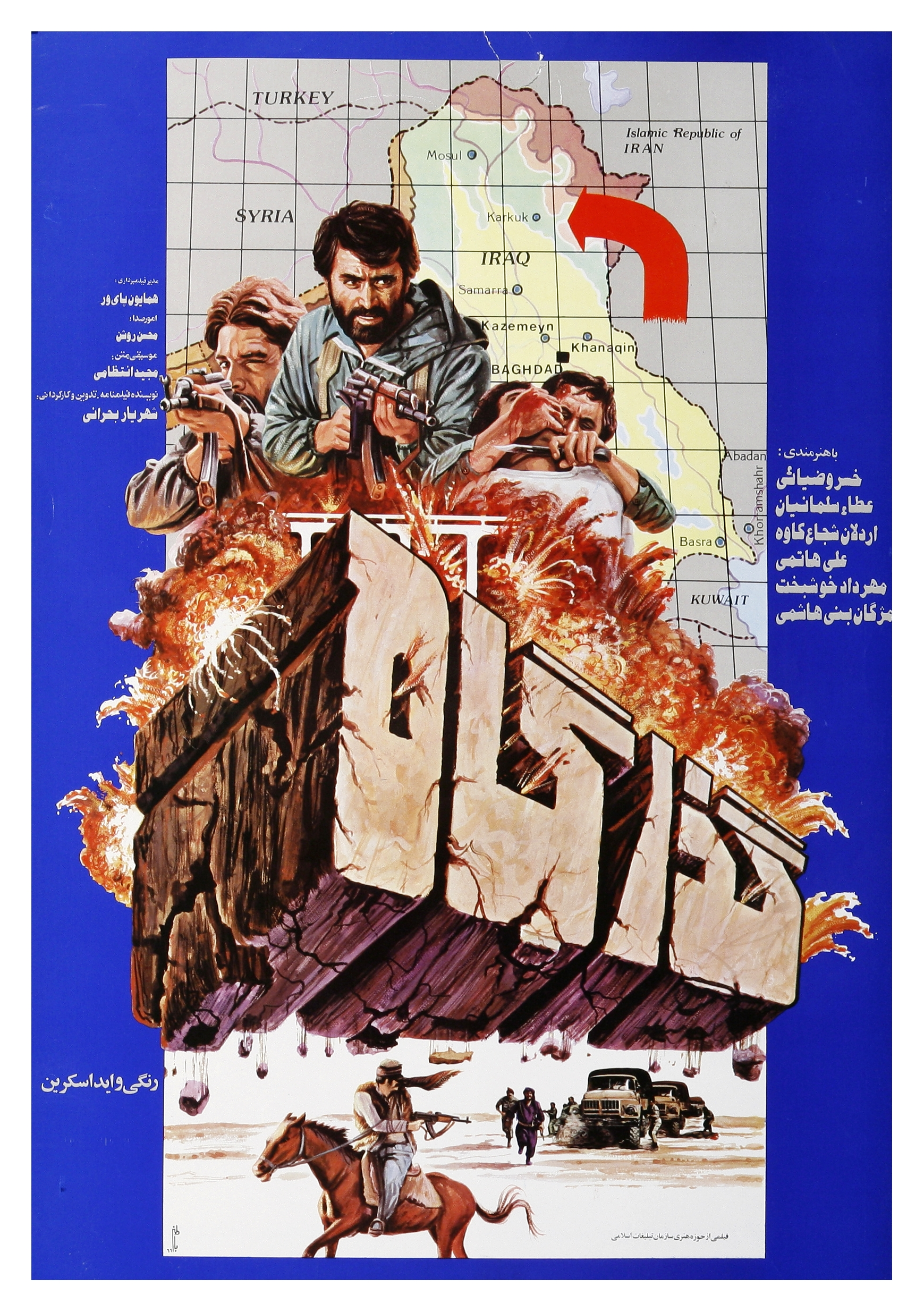
- Directed by: Shahriar Bahrani
- Written by: Shahriar Bahrani
- Produced by: Mohammad Bagher Ashtiani
- Cinematography: Homayoun Payvar
- Edited by: Seyyed Ahmad Miralai
- Music by: Majid Entezami
- Release date: 1986
- Running time: 90 minutes
- Country: Iran
- Language: Persian

The Passage is a 1986 film by the Iranian director Shahriar Bahrani. Bahrani also scripted the film which was lensed by Homayoun Payvar. Set during the Iran–Iraq War, it is an example of Sacred Defence cinema.

== Cast ==
- Khosrow Ziaei
- Ataullah Soleimanian
- Muharram Zeinalzadeh
- Zadeh Ardalan
- Shoja Kaveh
- Mehrdad Khoshbakht
- Mojgan Bani Hashimi
- Ali Shah Hatami
- Mohammad Alidoost
- Maliheh Keshari
- Ansieh Ghanbari
- Ruhollah Baradari
