= Journey to Chazabeh =

1996 film by Rasool Mollagholipour

Journey to Chazabeh (Persian: Safar be Chazabeh) is a 1996 film by the Iranian director Rasool Mollagholipour. Mollagholipour also scripted the film which starred Habib Allahyari, Farhad Aslani and Habib Dehghan Nasab. Set in the aftermath of the Iran-Iraq war, it is an example of Sacred Defence cinema.
