= Roxanne Varzi =

Iranian-American cultural anthropologist

- Born: 1971 (age 54–55); Iran
- Education: American University, Columbia University
- Known for: Warring Souls: Youth, Media, and Martyrdom in Post-Revolution Iran (book) (2006); Plastic Flowers Never Die (documentary) (2008); The Whole World Blind (sound performance) (2011); Last Scene Underground: An Ethnographic Novel of Iran (book) (2015); Salton Sublime (sound performance) (2017)
- Website: www.faculty.uci.edu/profile.cfm?faculty_id=5393

Roxanne Varzi (Persian: رکسانا ورزی; born 1971) is an Iranian-born American cultural anthropologist, filmmaker, sound artist, writer, playwright, and educator. She is a full professor of anthropology and film and media studies at University of California, Irvine (UCI). Varzi is known for her various works in media, including books, film documentaries, sound performances, and theatrical plays.

== Early life and education ==
Roxanne Varzi was born in 1971 in Iran, to an American mother and an Iranian father. Her family migrated to the United States after the Iranian Revolution in 1979, settling in Grosse Pointe, Michigan.

She moved in 1991 to continue her education at the American University in Cairo in Cairo, Egypt, and graduated in 1993 from American University in Washington D.C.. In 1994, she moved to Tehran and remained there for four years, and returned to the United States to continue her studies.

She was the first recipient of the Fulbright award to Iran since the Iranian Revolution. Varzi completed her PhD in 2002 at Columbia University for anthropology.

== Career ==
From 2002 to 2004, Varzi was an instructor of anthropology at New York University. From 2004-2005 she was at SOAS, London. Varzi joined the University of California, Irvine in 2005, and she became a full professor of in the Department of Anthropology in 2009.

While at the University of California, Irvine, she has completed many works. Even though many of her works are focused on Iranian culture, she has expanded her work to tackle universal issues concerning war. Due to her Iranian roots, many of her works focus on post-Revolution Iran public culture.

Her first book, Warring Souls: Youth, Media, and Martyrdom in Post-Revolution Iran (2006) focuses heavily on how propaganda and media take a role in shaping the identities of those living in post-Revolution Iran. The author says this that her book focuses on "the intersection of religion, vision, and power, and whether the individual ultimately has the power to turn an image off". Her second work, Plastic Flowers Never Die (2008) which is an experimental documentary on the effects of the war in Iran, and the aftermath of the war. In this documentary, she speaks to mural painters, museum curators, and veterans to get a thorough breakdown of war and how the post-war period has been affected by the war. Plastic Flowers Never Die was selected for 14 film festivals. The Whole World Blind (2011) was her first sound performance. It is said to be experienced while the audience is "blindfolded and wearing headphones". The audience listens to a "narrative loop of a curator describing a slide show of war photography". Her second book, Last Scene Underground: An Ethnographic Novel of Iran (2015) is a fictional story set in Iran's Green Movement about young Iranians learning life lessons "through politics, art, and the meaning of home". Her work, Salton Sublime (2017), is another sound performance focusing on what sublime means in the current state of environmental degradation our world is facing.

== Awards ==
- Fulbright Award (2000)
- Society for Humanistic Anthropology - Ethnographic Fiction Competition (2007)
- Gold medalist in multicultural fiction for Last Scene Underground, Independent Publisher Book Awards (2016)

== Publications ==
=== Books ===
- Varzi, Roxanne (2002). Visionary Terrains of Post Revolution Iran: War, Youth Culture, Media and Public Space (dissertation). Columbia University.
- Varzi, Roxanne (2006). Warring Souls: Youth, Media, and Martyrdom in Post-Revolution Iran. Duke University Press. ISBN 9780822337218.
- Varzi, Roxanne (2015). Last Scene Underground: An Ethnographic Novel of Iran. Stanford University Press. ISBN 9780804796897.

=== Chapters ===
- Karim, Persis M.; Khorrami, Mohammad Mehdi; Varzi, Roxanne (1999). "The Pelican". A World Between: Poems, Short Stories, and Essays by Iranian-Americans. George Braziller. pp. 214–. ISBN 9780807614457.
- Kim, David K.; Jackson, John L., eds. (2011). "Iran's French Revolution: Religion, Philosophy, and Crowds". Race, Religion, and Late Democracy. Volume 637 of Annals of the American Academy. SAGE. pp. 53–63. ISBN 9781452218267.

=== Articles ===
- Varzi, Roxanne (February 21, 2017). "Am I an immigrant?". London Review of Books.
- Varzi, Roxanne (June 5, 2018). "The Knot in the Wood: The Call to Multimodal Anthropology". American Anthropologist.
- Varzi, Roxanne (July 12, 2018). "Nicht Hier Und Nicht Dort" [Not Here and Not There]. Le Monde diplomatique (in German). LMd, Berlin.
- Varzi, Roxanne (June 18, 2020). "Commentary: A mask in the O.C. has become as heated as the veil in Iran". Daily Pilot, Los Angeles Times.

== Works ==
- Plastic Flowers Never Die (documentary) (2008)
- The Whole World Blind (sound performance) (2011)
- Salton Sublime (sound performance) (2017)
- Splinters of a Careless Alphabet (play) (2019)
- Act One to The End: Ask the Ayatollah (play) (2019)
