= Hamid Farrokhnezhad =

Iranian actor, writer and director

- حمید فرخ‌نژاد
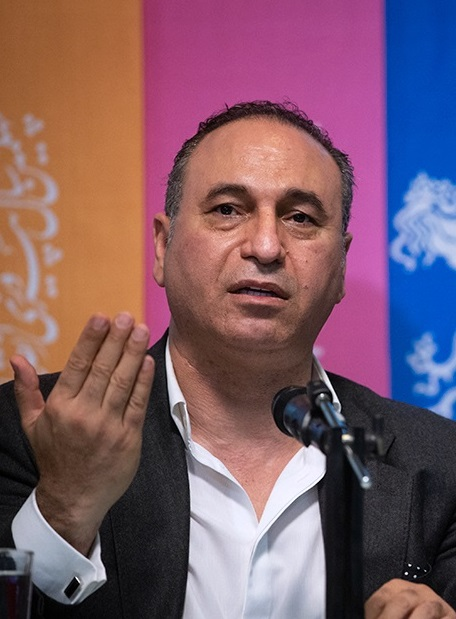
- Farrokhnezhad at the 2019 Fajr Film Festival
- Born: حمید فرخ‌نژاد; 17 April 1969 (age 57); Abadan, Iran
- Occupations: Actor, writer, director
- Years active: 1991–present
- Height: 1.92 m (6 ft 4 in)
- Spouse: Foroozan Jalilifar
- Children: 1

Hamid Farrokhnezhad (Persian: حمید فرخ‌نژاد, Romanized as 'Hamīd Farrokhnežād'; born 17 April 1969) is an Iranian actor, writer, and director. He has received various accolades, including four Crystal Simorgh (two for acting), two Hafez Awards, three Iran Cinema Celebration Awards, and an Iran's Film Critics and Writers Association Award.

== Career ==
He started his career in student theatre and making some short films. After acting in Khosrow Sinai's Dar Kooche-haye Eshgh he had the chance to play a role in another movie by Sinai, Aroos-e Atash aka Bride of fire which brought him many awards in Fajr Film Festival, Karlovy Vary International Film Festival and Khane-ye Cinema award. He had roles in three films by Sinai and had worked with notable Iranian directors such as Ebrahim Hatamikia, Asghar Farhadi and Bahram Beyzayi.

He also gained TV popularity after acting in the role of a ghost named "Hasan Golab" in a TV series directed by Ebrahim Hatamikia.

On 26 March 2022, following the Russian invasion of Ukraine, Farrokhnezhad criticized the invasion of Ukraine, calling it “savagery” and “brutal attack”, and announced that he returned the best actor award he had received from the 2005 Moscow International Film Festival, in protest of the invasion.

On 2 February 2026, Farrokhnezad boycotted the Fajr International Film Festival in protest of the government's handling of the 2025–2026 Iranian protests.

== Filmography ==
=== Film ===
Year	Film	English Title	Role	Director
1991	Dar Kooche-haye Eshgh	"In the alleys of love"		Khosrow Sinai
2000	Aroos-e Atash	"Bride of fire"	Farhan	Khosrow Sinai
2002	Low Heights	"Ertefa-e Past"	Ghasem	Ebrahim Hatamikia
2004	Tab	"The Fever"		Reza karimi
2004	Be Rang-e-Arghavan	"In Amethyst Color"	Behzad	Ebrahim Hatamikia
2005	Big Drum Under Left Foot	"Tabl-e Bozorg Zir-e Pay-e Chap"	"Hafez	Kazem Ma'soumi
2006	Sahne-ye Jorm, Voroud Mamnou'	"Crime scene, No admittance"	Maj. Parsa	Ebrahim Sheibani
2006	Fireworks Wednesday	"Chaharshanbeh Soori"	Morteza	Asghar Farhadi
2008	Haghighat-e Gomshodeh	"The lost truth"	Dr. Kia	Mohammad Ahmadi
2008	Atashkar	"Fire keeper"	Sohrab	Mohsen Amiryoussefi
2008	Hareem	"Sanctum"	Maj. Mohebbi	Reza Khatibi
2008	Shab-e Vaghe'e	"The night of the incident"	Daryagholi	Shahram Asadi
2009	Poosteh	"The shell"	Saeed	Mostafa Al-e Ahmad
2009	Bidari-e Royaha	"The Awakening of the Dreams"	Ayub's Brother	Mohammad Ali Bashe Ahangar
2009	Democracy Tou Rouze Roshan	"Democracy in Daylight"	Sotudeh	Ali Atshani
2010	Shokolat-e Dagh	"Hot Chokolate"		Hamed Kolahdari
2010	Dar Entezare Mojezeh	"Waiting for a Miracle"	Amir	Rasul Sadr Ameli
2010	Mohammad	"Muhammad"	Abu sufyan	Majid Majidi
2011	Gasht-e Ershad	"Guidance Patrol"	Haj Abbas	Saeed Soheili
2012	Zendegi-e Khosusi-e Agha va Khanom-e Mim	"The Private Life of Mr. & Mrs. M "	Mohsen Mehrad	Rouhollah Hejazi
2012	Parinaaz	"Parinaz"	Zakaria	Bahram Bahramian
2012	Esterdad	"Reclamation"	Faramarz Takin	Ali Ghaffari
2012	The Wedlock	"Zendegi-ye Moshtarek-e Aghaye Mahmoudi va Banoo"	Mansour Mahmoodi	Ruhollah Hejazi
2012	Besharat be yek shahrvand-e Hezareye Sevvom	"Annunciation to a Third Millennium Citizen"	Detective	Mohammad Hadi Karimi
2013	Mordan be Vaght-e Shahrivar	"Death ath the Time of Shahrivar"	Alireza	Hatef Alimardani
2013	Parvaz-e Zanburha	"Flight of the Bees"		Hamed Amrayi
2015	Yasin	"Yasin"	Mahmoud	Hamed Amrayi
2015	Moshkel-e Giti	"Guiti's Problem"	Iraj	Bahram Kazemi
2016	Khoob, Bad, Jelf	"the Good, the Bad, the Gaudy"	Major Shademan	Peiman Ghasemkhani
2016	Gasht 2	"The Patrol 2"	Haj Abbas	Saeed Soheili
2017	Bi hesab	Getting Even	Mohsen	Mostafa Ahmadi
2018	Lottery	Lottery	Morteza	Mohammad Hossein Mahdavian
2018	Tegzas	Texas	Uncle Hushang	Masoud Atyabi
2018	Ma shoma ra doost darim khanom-e Yaya	We like you Mrs Yaya	Morteza	Abdolreza Kahani
2019	Symphony No. 9	Symphony No. 9		Mohammad Reza Honarmand
2019	The Devil's Daughter		nader	Ghorban Mohammadpour

=== Writing, directing and producing ===
- Kooche-ye Payeez -1998 - Production Manager - Dir. Khosrow Sinai
- Aroos-e Atash - 2000 - Screenwriter - Dir. Khosrow Sinai
- Safar-e Sorkh - 2001 - Screenwriter and Director

=== Theater career ===
- 2004 - Shab-e Hezaroyekom (1001st night) - Dir. Bahram Beyzayi

=== TV career ===
- 2008 - Halghe-ye Sabz - Dir. Ebrahim Hatamikia

== Awards and nominations ==
- Crystal Simorgh of Best supporting actor for Aroos-e Atash in 18th Fajr International Film Festival
- Crystal Simorgh of Best screenplay for Aroos-e Atash in 18th Fajr International Film Festival
- 35th Karlovy Vary International Film Festival award for best actor for Aroos-e Atash
- The award for Iranian actor of the year by Film Magazine critics in 2002 and 2003
- Best Actor award for Tabl-e Bozorg Zir-e Pay-e Chap at the 27th Moscow International Film Festival in 2005
- Crystal Simorgh for Best leading actor for Esterdad in 31st Fajr International dFilm Festival
