= The Flag Bearer =

1984 Iranian film by Shahriar Bahrani

The Scout
- Directed by: Shahriar Bahrani
- Written by: Abbas Soleimani
- Release date: 1984
- Running time: 95 minutes
- Country: Iran
- Language: Persian

The Flag Bearer (Persian: Parcham-dar) is a 1984 film by the Iranian director Shahriar Bahrani. Bahrani also wrote the script for the film which was lensed by Abbas Soleimani. Abbas Naseri, Dehkharghani Seyed, Ahmad Mir, Alaei Reza Agharabi, Hojjatollah Goodarzi starred in the principal roles. Set during the Iran–Iraq War, the film is an early example of Sacred Defence cinema.
