= Hamid Reza Sadr =

Iranian film critic (1956–2021)

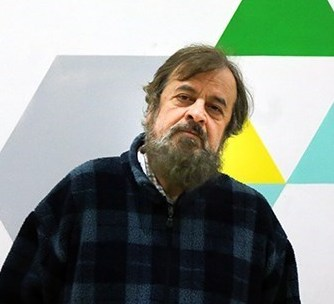
- Sadr at 36th Fajr Film Festival
- Born: 19 April 1956; Mashhad, Iran
- Died: 16 July 2021 (aged 65); California, United States
- Resting place: Behesht-e Zahra
- Education: Tehran University; University of Leeds
- Occupations: Journalist, author, critic, professor
- Writing career
- Period: 1981–2021
- Subjects: Cinema, football

Hamid Reza Sadr (Persian: حمیدرضا صدر; 19 April 1956 – 16 July 2021) was an Iranian football and film critic, journalist, author, university professor, historian, and economist. Sadr earned a Ph.D. in urban planning after studying at both the University of Tehran and the University of Leeds in England. He was well known for his publications on various subjects such as football, cinema, and non-fiction based on history and social studies.

== Career ==
From 1981, Sadr's movie reviews were published in many Iranian journals, including Zan-e Rooz, Soroush, Film Magazine, Film International, and Haft (Seven) magazine. He defined his critical approach to films as "relative, not unconditional"; he analysed a film for what he felt was its likely audience, yet he usually approached movies emotionally, with a strongly touching writing style. He was especially scathing towards some films that incurred widespread critical disapproval, such as the work of Bahram Beizai and Masoud Kimiai. The originality of his opinions, as well as the vigorous way in which he expressed them, won him eager supporters as well as angry critics.

He translated From Reverence to Rape: The Treatment of Women in the Movies, the influential book by Molly Haskell, which was published in Zan-e Rooz magazine.

He wrote a book on politics and Iranian cinema, Iranian Cinema: A Political History. The comprehensive analysis provided in this book gives refreshing, up-to-date introduction to those interested in Iranian cinema and its socio-political dimensions and history, observing recurrent themes and genres as well as highlighting lesser-known thematic concerns and figures. Sadr, while acknowledging the lack of imaginative expression in mainstream Iranian cinema, the weak scripts, the poor performances, the repetitive and conservative nature and content, argued for and analysed the political contexts and the constant shifts embedded within even the apparently least noteworthy Iranian films.

Sadr was known for his monthly column, "Shadow of Imagination" {سایه خیال}, which appeared in Film Magazine, and his reports on international film festivals, particularly on the London Film Festival. He interviewed many famous actors, directors and film critics, including Anthony Hopkins, Peter O'Toole, Mike Leigh, Jim Jarmusch, Carlos Saura, Andrei Konchalovsky, Peter Wollen, Laura Mulvey, Jeffrey Noel Smith, John Gillett, Sohrab Shahid-Sales and Farokh Ghafari.

He was a co-producer of Looking for Scheherazade, a documentary directed by Safi Yazdanian in 2003.

Sadr was a soccer enthusiast and wrote several features on sociology, politics and football. His book Once Upon a Time Football is about politics and football but also tells the story of his relationship with football and its effect on his own personal life. Sadr became famous for his many appearances over several years on Iranian national television, where he talked about football matches.

== Death ==
Sadr was diagnosed with stage IV colon cancer in September 2018. He began writing his last book on the day he found out about his illness, a book about his battle with it and the thoughts and feelings he experienced in the following months. After a three-year battle, he died of cancer on 16 July 2021 at the age of 65 years. The book (From Gheytarieh to Orange County) was published shortly after his death with the last chapter being written by his daughter detailing the final days before his death.

== Books ==
- Comedy Cinema (Tehran, 1987, Film Publication)
- Conversation note to Dora, 1994 ISBN 978-3-216-30071-3
- یه چیزی بگو by Laurie Halse Anderson, 1999 (Translator)
- Sadr, Hamid Reza (2006). Iranian Cinema: A Political History. Ney Publications. p. 392. ISBN 978-1845111465.
- The Memorial Secretary: A Novel ISBN 978-3-552-06006-7
- Against the Wind: Politics of Iranian Cinema (Tehran, 2002, Zarrin Publications)
- Iranian Cinema: A Political History (London, 2006, I.B. Tauris)
- Once Upon a Time Football (Tehran, 2000, Avige Publication) which is a personal review of football based on political and social events.
- A contributor in Life and Art : The New Iranian Cinema (BFI, 1999, London)
- A contributor in The New Iranian Cinema: Politics, Representation & Identity (London, 2002, I.B. Tauris)
- The Damned Utd (Tehran, 2010, Cheshmeh Publications) which is a translation of David Peace's novel.
- Once Upon a Time Football (Tehran, 2011, Cheshmeh Publications) which is the updated version of the previous book.
- The curse of the greengrocer Mohamed Bouazizi. Democracy or Islamic Rule? Vienna Lectures in the City Hall, Vol. 158, 2011 ISBN 978-3-854-52558-5
- Sadr, Hamid Reza (2012). The Hot Seat. Cheshmeh Publications. p. 413.
- A Boy On the Terraces (Tehran, 2013, Cheshmeh Publications)
- Sadr, Hamid Reza (2014). You Will Die in Cairo. Cheshmeh Publications. p. 216., non fiction and the winner of Jalal Al-e Ahmad Literary Awards.
- Speak (Tehran, 2017, Cheshmeh Publications), Translation of Laurie Halse Anderson's novel.
- Three Hundred Twenty Five (Tehran, 2017, Cheshmeh Publications), non-fiction novel.
- The Eternal Jerseys (Tehran, 2018, Cheshmeh Publications), A poetic look at the legendary football players.
- From Gheytarieh to Orange County (Tehran, 2021, Cheshmeh Publications), non-fiction about his life from the day he found out he had cancer until his death.
