= Man and Weapon =

Man and the Gun
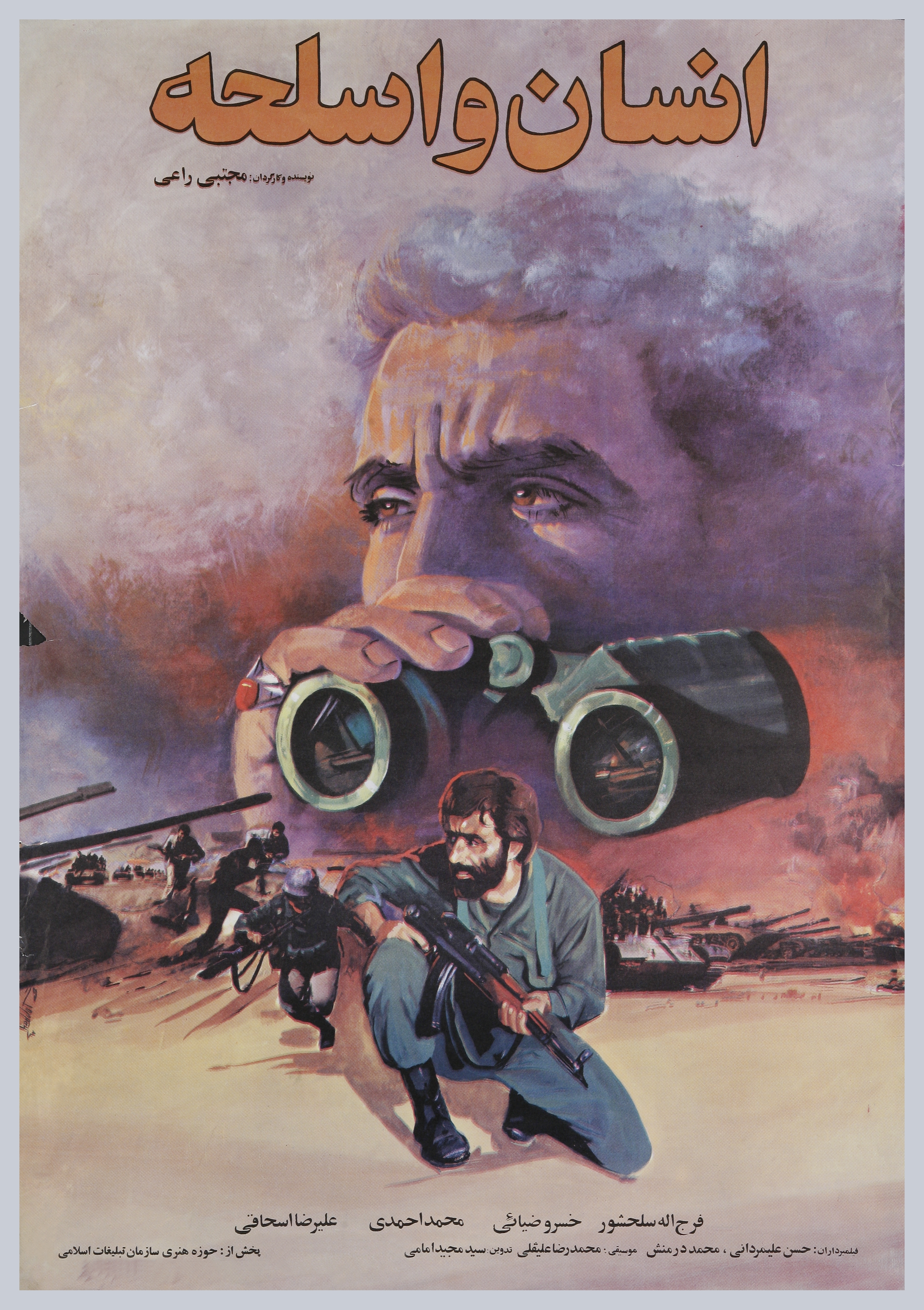
- Directed by: Mojtaba Raei
- Written by: Mojtaba Raei; Khalil Ab-Borin
- Produced by: Mojtaba Raei; Farajollah Salahshour
- Starring: Farajollah Salahshour; Khosrow Ziaei; Mohammad Ahmadi; Alireza Eshaghi; Gholamreza Ali-Akbari
- Cinematography: Hassan Alimardani; Mohammad Darmanesh
- Edited by: Seyyed Majid Emami
- Music by: Mohammad Reza Aligholi
- Production company: Ansar Film
- Distributed by: Hozeh Honari
- Release date: May 7, 1989
- Running time: 100 minutes
- Country: Iran
- Language: Persian

Man and Weapon (Persian: Ensan va aslahe) is a 1989 film by the Iranian director Mojtaba Raie. Raie also co-wrote the script for the film, which starred Farajollah Salahshoor, Khosrow Ziaee and Alireza Eshaghi. Set during the Iran-Iraq war, the film is an example of Sacred Defence cinema.
