= Khorshid Karevan =

1990 play by Mahdi Motevasseli

Khorshid Karevan (خورشید کاروان)
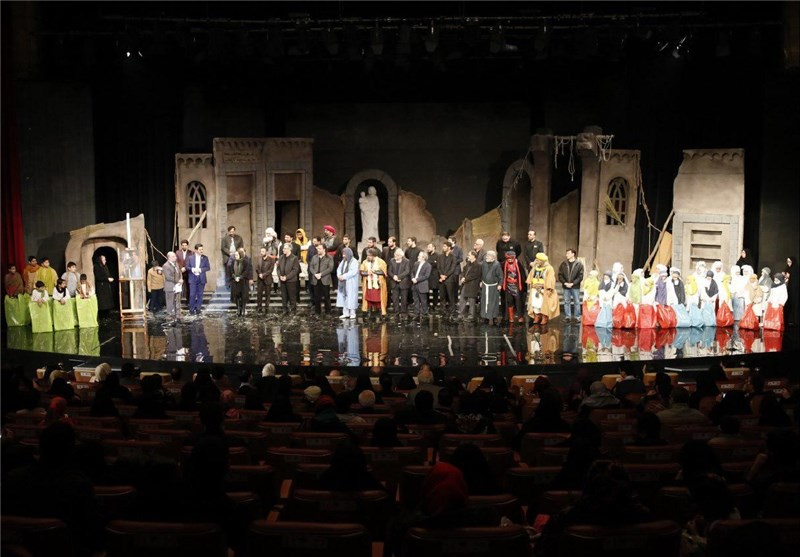
- Closing ceremony for the 2015 performance of in Tehran
- Written by: Mahdi Motevasseli
- Characters: The Christian Monk, Petros, Zajr, Mokhaffar, The commander, The soldier, the kids (1 to 5)
- Original language: Persian
- Subject: Aftermath of Ashura
- Genre: Historical drama
- Setting: year 61 AH ( in AHt: 680 CE) in Levant

Premiere
- Date premiered: 1990

Khorshid Karevan (Persian: خورشید کاروان) is an Iranian play written by Mahdi Motevasseli from the Fadak Cultural Institute started in 1990, played on scene for 29 consecutive years in Iran. The play has also been on scene in countries other than Iran including UK, UAE and the Netherlands. The popular religious theater in 2015 attracted 23,000 spectators attending the performance in Tehran in Milad tower. It has been estimated that more than a million spectators in total have seen the performance over the past 26 years. The theater goes on scene in Muharram and Safar in memory of Ashura and its aftermath every year in Tehran and other cities in Iran.

Hossein Mosafer Astaneh and Mahmoud Farhang has been the first and the second directors of the play respectively.

== Cast ==
Anoushirvan Arjmand has been playing the role of the Christian Monk for 22 years until he died in 2014. Jalil Farjad replaced him in 2015. Keramat Roodsaz, Asadollah Babaii, Farhad BEsharati and Mahdi Amini are among the players for the last performance.

== Synopsis ==
A Christian Monk with his junior student (Petros) discuss the actual reference of the names "Ilia", "Shebr" and "Shobair" mentioned in the holy book in a remote, worn-out church outside Levant where the Caravan of Captives of Karbala along with Kufa army commander and soldiers reached the church. The soldiers discovers an ancient slate in the church that mentions the name of Hussein and damned his murderers and think that the Christian Monk and his student are connected to Hussein somehow and get ready to kill them. Hereafter the night at the church sees a lot of dramatic events and emotional episodes where the story of Ashura are being gradually told by the characters.

== History of the play ==
The current form of play is inspired from the play named "Haiha't" written by Abu Basem Hayadaar. The play was on stage for the first time in 1990 and kept being performed every year during Muharram ceremonies in Iran.
