= Land of Lovers =

1984 film

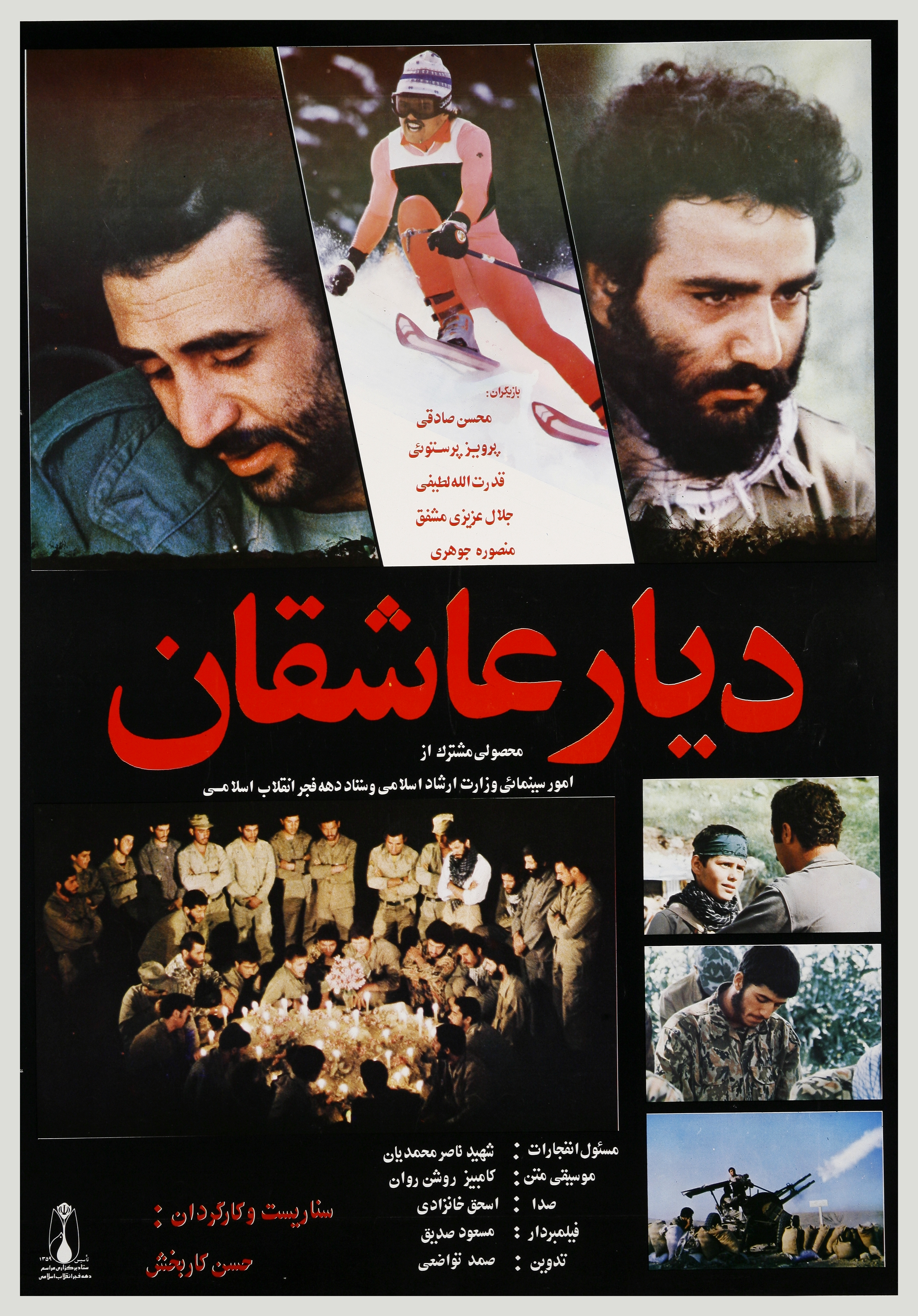

Land of Lovers (Persian: Diar-e asheghan; alternative English title: Lover's Place) is a 1984 film by the Iranian director Hassan Karbakhsh. Karbakhsh also wrote the script for the film, which starred Mohsen Sadeghi, Parviz Parastui and Ghodrat Latifi. Parastui was lauded at the 1985 Fajr Film Festival for his acting in this film.

Set during the Iran-Iraq war, the film is an example of Sacred Defence cinema and is considered "the first film with a distinctly Iranian treatment of the war, although this kind of approach soon gave way to cliches".
