= Jalil Farjad =

Iranian theater, cinema and TV actor

- جلیل فرجاد
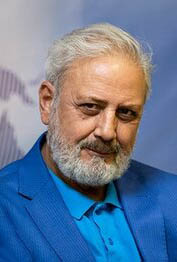
- Born: 9 March 1952 (age 73); Marand, Iran
- Occupation(s): Theatre and film actor
- Children: 2

Jalil Farjad (Persian: جلیل فرجاد; born 9 March 1952) is an Iranian theater, cinema and TV actor.

== Selected filmography ==
- Tebyan Stories, 2017
- Cheshm-o Cheragh, 2016
- Rah-e Darrow, 2011
- Cheshm-e Khoda, 2010
- Mahfel-e X, 2010
- Operation 125, 2008
- Ominous Seed, 2008
- Alphabet of Murder, 2005
- Khaneh dar Tariki, 2004
- Die Hard, 1999
- Khorshid Karevan, 1990
- Identity, 1987
