= The Red Ribbon =

- English poster of the film
- Directed by: Ebrahim Hatamikia
- Written by: Ebrahim Hatamikia
- Starring: Parviz Parastui; Reza Kianian; Azita Hajian
- Cinematography: Hassan Pooya
- Edited by: Hayedeh Safiyari
- Music by: Mohammadreza Aligholi
- Distributed by: Vara Honar
- Release date: September 23, 1999
- Running time: 118 minutes
- Country: Iran
- Language: Persian

The Red Ribbon (Persian: روبان قرمز) is a 1999 Iranian war drama film directed by Ebrahim Hatamikia. The film was submitted to the 17th Fajr International Film Festival and won three Crystal Simorghs in the fields of best directing, best editing and best actress. The film looks a lot like The English Patient. Hatamikia's ability to translate an American film scenario for an Iranian audience and make it look like the Iran-Iraq war points to the universality of war.

== Plot ==
Three stubborn characters confront each other in a mine-riddled no-man's-land in the devastated South. Mahboobeh, a headstrong, grief-crazed woman who grew up in the area; Davoud, an embittered veteran focused to the point of insanity on his job clearing mines and Jomeh, an Afghan refugee whose own experience of tragedy gives him the empathy to communicate with his fellow outcasts.

== Cast ==
- Parviz Parastui as Davoud

The bearded rough looking man, whose job is taking out land mines.

- Reza Kianian as Jomeh

A mysterious Afghani who lives in a dump where a thousand war tanks are kept.

- Azita Hajian as Mahboobeh

A woman who has lost everything and now only wants to live in her family`s ruined house.

== Reception ==
Richard Peña, Professor of Professional Practice at the School of The Arts at Columbia University, mentioned Azita Hajian, who won the award for best actress in the 17th Fajr International Film Festival, does give an extremely intense, amazingly physical performance. The film is a dense, highly metaphoric drama involving three characters and set in a tank graveyard in the no-man's-land between Iran and Iraq. It reminded him a bit of some of the later absurdist dramas by Fernando Arrabal and others. As he noted on early 1999, it seemed to be a great favorite with many of the Iranian critics, however yet fared less well with the foreign guests of the Fajr festival.
