= Two Blind Eyes =

Two Blind Eyes (Persian: دو چشم بی‌سو, romanized: Do cheshm-e bi-soo) is a 1983 film by the Iranian director Mohsen Makhmalbaf. The film was written by Makhmalbaf and shot by Ebrahim Ghazizadeh. Set during the Iran-Iraq war, it is an early example of Sacred Defence cinema.

== Cast ==
- Mohammad Kasebi
- Majid Majidi
- Reza Cheraghi
- Habib Valinezhad
- Ghasem Kharrazani
- Esmat Makhmalbaf
- Fatemeh Meshkini
- Hamid Derakhshan
- Behzad Behzadpour
- Hossein Sabri
- Ebrahim Majidi
