= Identity (1987 film) =

1987 Iranian film by Ebrahim Hatamikia

- Directed by: Ebrahim Hatamikia
- Written by: Ebrahim Hatamikia
- Screenplay by: Ebrahim Hatamikia
- Starring: Jalil Farjad; Reza Asadi; Ali Gholami
- Cinematography: Morteza Poursamadi
- Edited by: Darioush Ashouri
- Music by: Mohammadreza Mohseni
- Production company: IRIB TV2
- Release date: 1 February 1987 (Fajr)
- Running time: 90 minutes
- Country: Iran
- Language: Persian

Identity (Persian: هویت, romanized: Hovīyat) is a 1987 film by the Iranian director Ebrahim Hatamikia. Hatamikia also scripted the film, which starred Jalil Farjad. Set during the Iran-Iraq war, it is an example of Sacred Defense cinema, depicting the Iran–Iraq War's impact on Iran.

== Cast ==
- Jalil Farjad
- Reza Asadi
- Ali Gholami
- Abolghasem Mobaraki
- Ahmad Nateghi
- Mohsen Aziminia
