= Shirin Bina =

Iranian actress

Shirin Bina شیرین بینا
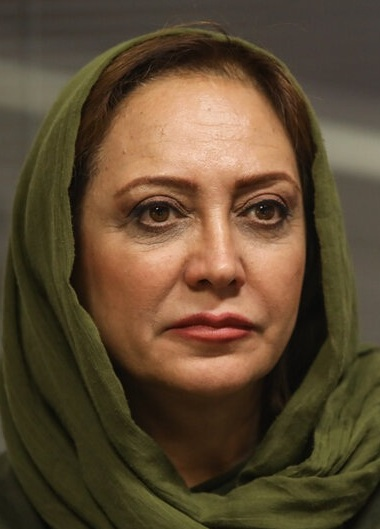
- Shirin Bina, 23 November 2019
- Born: Shirin Sedgh-Gooya; 20 August 1964 (age 62); Marand, Iran
- Occupation: Actress
- Years active: 1994–present

Shirin Bina (Persian: شیرین بینا) is an Iranian theater, cinema and TV actress born on 20 August 1964 Marand, Iran.

== Filmography ==
Year	Title
2021	Island (TV series)
2018	Eshghulance
2014	Panj Setareh
2013	Motherly
2013	Hush! Girls Don't Scream
2011	To Va Man
2009	Harim
2008	Shirin
2007	The Trial
2004	Komakam Kon (TV Series)
2003	Mashgh Eshgh (TV Series)
2003	The Wind Carpet
2001	Traveler from India (TV Series)
2000	Saint Mary (TV Series)
1999	Sohrab
1996	Bag of Rice
1995	The Scent of Joseph's Shirt
1994	Tick Tack
