= The Wind Carpet =

- Theatrical release poster
- Persian: فرش باد
- Japanese: 風の絨毯
- Directed by: Kamal Tabrizi
- Written by: Masako Imai; Mohammad Soleimani
- Produced by: Alireza Shoja Nouri; Production Manager: Farhad Kaynezhad
- Starring: Reza Kianian; Rentarō Mikuni; Youki Kudoh; Hushang Harirchiyan; Shirin Bina; Miyu Yagyu; Maryam Boubani
- Cinematography: Hassan Pooya; Tadayuki Ui
- Edited by: Hossein Zandbaf
- Music by: Peyman Yazdanian
- Distributed by: Sony Pictures
- Release date: 16 May 2003 (Cannes Film Festival)
- Running time: 111 minutes
- Country: Iran
- Languages: Persian; Japanese

The Wind Carpet, also known as Kaze no jûtan or Farshe Baad (Persian: فرش باد), is a 2003 Iranian drama film directed by Kamal Tabrizi.

== Plot ==
A Japanese female designer wants a carpet made that she plans to show at the Nakayama Carnival. She asks weavers in Isfahan to weave the carpet, but her death leaves the work unfinished. Her husband and daughter go to Iran to finish the incomplete work and become the guests of a family in Isfahan.

== Cast ==
- Reza Kianian
- Rentarō Mikuni
- Youki Kudoh
- Hushang Harirchiyan
- Shirin Bina
- Miyu Yagyu
- Maryam Boubani
- Fereydoon Heydari
- Mohammadreza Khorshidi
- Reza Nabavi
- Takaaki Enoki
- Yuri Masuda
- Farboud Ahmadjoo
- Fariba Kamran
- Hossein Ghgiabi
- Abbas Ahmadi Motlagh
- Mehdi Tarokh
