= Miyu Yagyu =

Japanese actress (born 1990)

- 柳生 みゆ, 柳生 美結
- Born: 20 October 1990 (age 35); Osaka Prefecture, Japan
- Occupations: Actress; tarento; model
- Years active: 1999–present
- Agent: Hirata Office
- Notable work: Kaze no Jūtan; Two Love –Futatsu no Ai no Monogatari–; Stay; Saitai
- Style: Television drama; film; advertisements
- Height: 1.56 m (5 ft 1 1/2 in)
- Website: Official website

Miyu Yagyu (柳生 みゆ, 柳生 美結, Yagyū Miyu; born 20 October 1990, in Osaka Prefecture, Japan) is a Japanese actress, tarento, and fashion model who has appeared in a number of feature films and television series. She is represented with Hirata Office. She is nicknamed Gyū-chan (ぎゅうーちゃん).

== Filmography ==
=== TV series ===
| Year | Title | Role | Notes | Ref. |
|---|---|---|---|---|
| 2011 | Carnation | Shizuko Ohara | Asadora | |
| 2016 | Asa ga Kita | Sachi Shiroka | Asadora | |
| 2024 | Dear Radiance | Toshiko | Taiga drama | |

=== Films ===
| Year | Title | Role | Notes | Ref. |
|---|---|---|---|---|
| 2003 | The Wind Carpet | Sakura Nagai | Lead role | |
| 2005 | The Innocent Seven | Shoko Nishiyama | | |
| 2007 | I Just Didn't Do It | Toshiko Furukawa | | |
| 2007 | Stay | Michiru Sanno | Lead role | |
| 2007 | Virgin Snow | Yuri Sasaki | South Korean-Japanese film | |
| 2008 | Goth | Sakura Kamiyama | | |
| 2012 | Saitai | Ayano Takeda | Lead role | |
| 2014 | Fatal Frame | Toshiko Makino | | |
| 2020 | All the Things We Never Said | | | |
| 2026 | Busshi | Kaori Yamashita | | |
| 2026 | Mystery Arena | | | |

=== Short films, unreleased films ===
| Year | Title | Role | Notes | Ref. |
|---|---|---|---|---|
| 2005 | Dennō Girl | Chinatsu | Lead role | |
| 2015 | Bouquet nante iranai! | Mako | | |

== Bibliography ==
=== Magazines ===
| Year | Title | Ref. |
|---|---|---|
| 2007 | Pichi Lemon | |
| 2012 | Miyu. | |
