= Minoo Watchtower =

1996 film

Minoo Watchtower is a 1996 drama film by the Iranian director Ebrahim Hatamikia. Hatamikia also wrote the script for the film, which was lensed by Aziz Sa'ati. Niki Karimi, Ali Mosaffa and Mohamad Reza Sharifinia starred in the principal roles.

The film is an example of Sacred Defense cinema, a genre of Iranian films depicting the Iran–Iraq War's impact on Iran.
