= A Military Base in Hell =

- Directed by: Akbar Sadeghi
- Written by: Akbar Sadeghi
- Produced by: Akbar Sadeghi
- Starring: Faramarz Gharibian; Jamshid Hashempur; Zakaria Hashemi; Hossein Mollaghasemi; Ali Mahzoun; Majid Mirzayian
- Release date: 20 March 1985
- Running time: 117 minutes
- Country: Iran
- Language: Persian

A Military Base in Hell (Persian: پایگاه جهنمی, "Pāygāh-e jahannami") is an Iranian film by the director Akbar Sadeghi. Sadeghi also scripted the film. It was released in 1984, and is an early example of Sacred Defense Cinema, i.e. cinema about the Iran–Iraq war. Among others, it starred Faramarz Gharibian, Jamshid Hashempur, and Zakaria Hashemi.
