= Hesar (film) =

Hesar (Fence) is a 1983 film by the Iranian director Hassan Mohammadzadeh. It was written by Fazlullah Nuri. It starred Jeyran Sharif and Morteza Najafi. It is set during the Iran-Iraq war and is an early example of Sacred Defence cinema.
