= Al Young =

American poet, novelist, essayist, screenwriter (1939–2021)

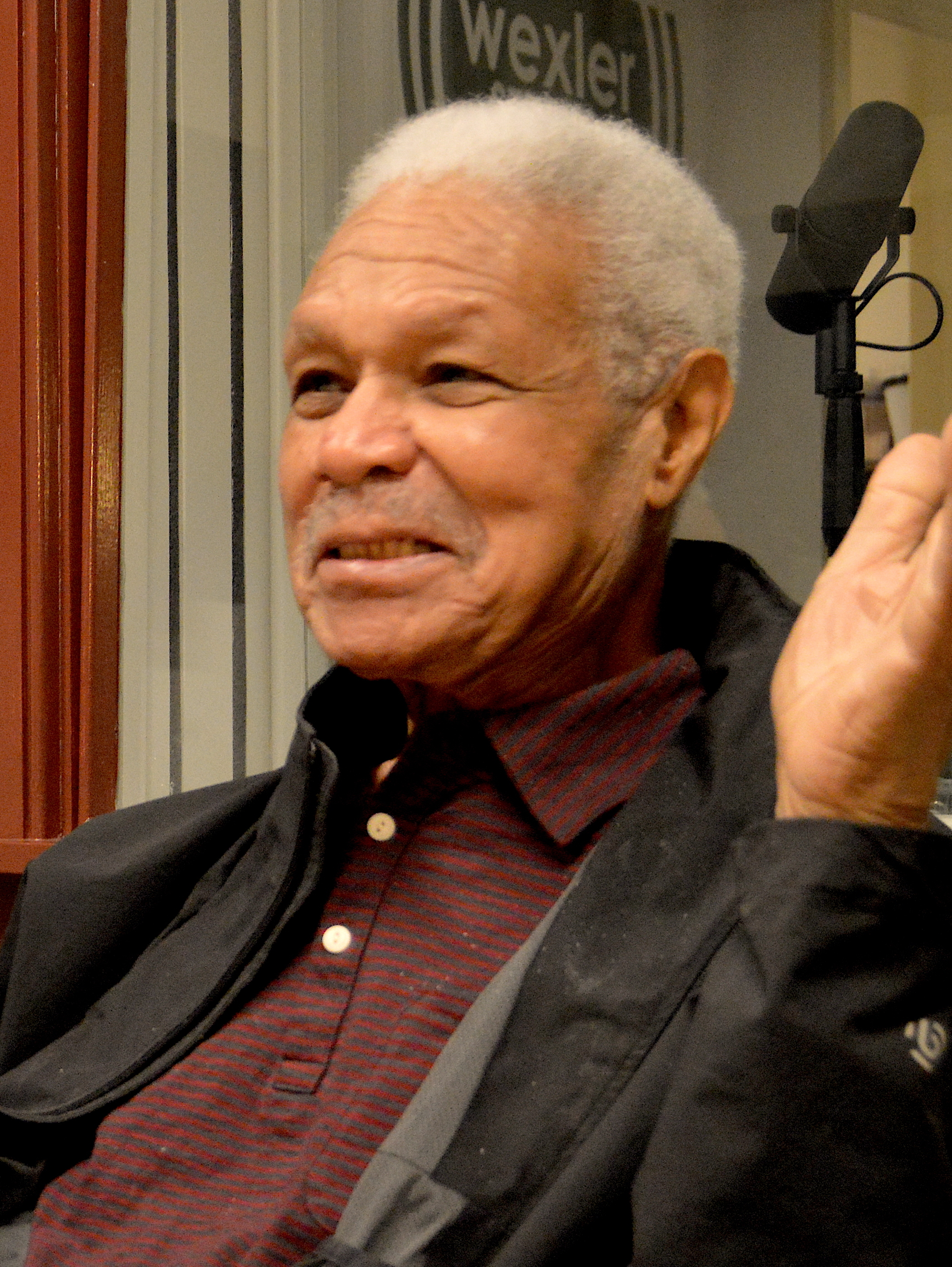
- Young in 2018
- Born: Albert James Young; May 31, 1939; Ocean Springs, Mississippi, U.S.
- Died: April 17, 2021 (aged 81); Concord, California, U.S.
- Other name: Earnest James Young
- Education: University of Michigan; University of California, Berkeley (BA)
- Spouse: Arline June Belch (m. 1963–2016; death)
- Children: 1
- Awards: Poet Laureate of California (2005–2008)
- Website: Official website

Albert James Young (May 31, 1939 – April 17, 2021) was an American poet, novelist, essayist, screenwriter, and professor. He was named Poet Laureate of California by Governor Arnold Schwarzenegger from 2005 to 2008. Young's many books included novels, collections of poetry, essays, and memoirs. His work appeared in literary journals and magazines including Paris Review, Ploughshares, Essence, The New York Times, Chicago Review, Seattle Review, Brilliant Corners: A Journal of Jazz & Literature, Chelsea, Rolling Stone, Gathering of the Tribes, and in anthologies including the Norton Anthology of African American Literature, and the Oxford Anthology of African American Literature.

== Early life ==
Born May 31, 1939, in Ocean Springs, Mississippi, on the Gulf Coast near Biloxi. His maternal grandparents had been sharecroppers. Young attended the "Kingston School for Colored", a segregated school in the South. He graduated in 1957 from Central High School in Detroit.

From 1957 to 1960 he attended the University of Michigan. At the University of Michigan, he co-edited Generation, the campus literary magazine. He also met classmate Janet Coleman in Michigan, whom he later co-authored work with in 1989.

In 1961, he moved to the San Francisco Bay Area. Settling at first in Berkeley, California, he held a wide variety of jobs (including folksinger, lab aide, disk jockey, medical photographer, clerk typist, employment counselor). He graduated with honors in 1969 from University of California, Berkeley (UC Berkeley), with a degree in Spanish.

== Career and teaching ==
Young taught poetry, fiction writing and American literature at UC Berkeley; University of California, Santa Cruz from 1983 until the early 1990s; University of California, Davis; Bowling Green State University; Foothill College; the Colorado College; Rice University; the University of Washington; the University of Michigan; and the University of Arkansas.

From 1969 to 1976, he was Edward B. Jones Lecturer in Creative Writing at Stanford University near Palo Alto, where he lived and worked for three decades.

In the 1970s, he wrote film scripts Joseph Strick, Sidney Poitier, Bill Cosby, and Richard Pryor. Young also wrote liner notes for George Benson's Breezin' album (1976).

In 2002, he was appointed the San José State University's Lurie Distinguished Professor of Creative Writing.

He also taught at Charles University in the Czech Republic under the auspices of the Prague Summer Programs. In the spring of 2003, he taught poetry at Davidson College (Davidson, NC), where he was McGee Professor in Writing. In the fall of 2003, as the first Coffey Visiting professor of creative writing at Appalachian State University in Boone, NC, he taught a poetry workshop. From 2003 to 2006, he served on the faculty of Cave Canem's summer workshop retreats for African-American poets.

His students included poet Persis Karim.

== Honors and awards ==
In 1974, Young was awarded a Guggenheim fellowship in fiction. He was also awarded a Fulbright fellowship, two Puschart prizes, the PEN-USA Award, multiple National Endowment for the Arts fellowships, and a Wallace Stegner fellowship. He twice received the American Book Award, for Bodies and Soul: Musical Memoirs (1982), and The Sound of Dreams Remembered: Poems 1990–2000 (2002).

In the 1980s and 1990s, as a cultural ambassador for the United States Information Agency, he traveled throughout South Asia, Egypt, Jordan, Israel and the Palestinian West Bank.

In 2001, he traveled to the Persian Gulf to lecture on American and African-American literature and culture in Kuwait and in Bahrain for the U.S. Department of State. Subsequent lecture tours took him to Southern Italy in 2004, and to Italy in 2005. His poetry and prose have been translated into Italian, Spanish, Swedish, Norwegian, Serbo-Croatian, Polish, Chinese, Japanese, Russian, German, Urdu, Korean, and other languages. Blending story, recitation and song, Young often performed with musicians.

On May 15, 2005, he was named Poet Laureate of California by Governor Arnold Schwarzenegger. In appointing Young as Poet Laureate in 2005, the Governor Schwarzenegger praised him: "He is an educator and a man with a passion for the Arts. His remarkable talent and sense of mission to bring poetry into the lives of Californians is an inspiration." Muriel Johnson, Director of the California Arts Council declared: "Like jazz, Al Young is an original American voice."

In 2009, Young was awarded an honorary Doctorate of Humane Letters (L.H.D.) from Whittier College.

== Family life and death ==
He was married to technical writer and editor Arline June Young (née Belch) from 1963 until her death in 2016. The couple had one child, a son named Michael. After living in Palo Alto from 1969 to 1999, in 2000 Young returned to Berkeley, where he continued to freelance.

In February 2019, Young had a stroke. He died of complications of the stroke on April 17, 2021, in Concord, California, aged 81.

== Published works ==
=== Poetry collections, full-length ===
- Dancing: Poems. Corinth Books. 1969. ISBN 9780870910579.
- The Song Turning Back Into Itself. Holt, Rinehart and Winston. 1971. ISBN 9780030866920.
- Geography of the Near Past: Poems. Holt paperback. Holt, Rinehart, and Winston. 1976. ISBN 9780030138768.
- The Blues Don't Change: New and Selected Poems. Louisiana State University Press. 1982. ISBN 9780807109786.
- Heaven: Collected Poems: 1956-1990. Berkeley, CA: Creative Arts Book Company. 1992. ISBN 9780887390692.
- The Sound of Dreams Remembered: Poems 1990-2000. Loveletter Editions. 2001. ISBN 9781427601148.
- Coastal Nights and Inland Afternoons: Poems 2001-2006. Angel City Press. 2006. ISBN 9781883318734.
- Something About the Blues: An Unlikely Collection of Poetry. Sourcebooks MediaFusion. 2008. ISBN 9781402210648.

=== Chapbooks ===
- Straight No Chaser. A Donald S. Ellis book. Berkeley, CA: Creative Arts Book Company. 1994. ISBN 9780887391064.
- Conjugal Visits: And Other Poems in Poetry and Prose. Berkeley, CA: Creative Arts Book Company. 1996. ISBN 9780887391187.

=== Musical memoirs ===
- Drowning in the Sea of Love: Musical Memoirs. Ecco Press. 1995. ISBN 9780880013888.
- Janet, Coleman; Al, Young (1989). Mingus/Mingus: Two Memoirs. Berkeley, CA: Creative Arts Book Company. ISBN 9780887390678.
- Things Ain't What They Used To Be: Musical Memoirs. A Donald S. Ellis Book. Berkeley, CA: Creative Arts Book Company. 1987. ISBN 9780887390241.
- Kinds of Blue: Musical Memoirs. D.S. Ellis. 1984. ISBN 9780916870829.
- Bodies & Soul: Musical Memoirs. Berkeley, CA: Creative Arts Book Company. 1981. ISBN 9780916870393.

=== Novels ===
- Seduction by Light. Delta Fiction. 1988. ISBN 9780440550037.
- Ask Me Now. San Francisco, CA: McGraw-Hill. 1980. ISBN 9780070723603.
- Sitting Pretty: A Novel. Holt, Rinehart and Winston. 1976. ISBN 9780030152665.
- Who is Angelina?: A Novel. Holt, Rinehart and Winston. 1975. ISBN 9780030122712.
- Snakes. Holt, Rinehart and Winston. 1970. ISBN 9780030845352.

=== Collaborations ===
- Jazz Idiom: blueprints, stills, and frames: the jazz photography of Charles L. Robinson (photographs and comments by Charles L. Robinson, poetic takes and riffs by Al Young, Heyday Books, 2008)

=== Anthologies edited ===
- The Literature of California, Volume 1: Native American Beginnings to 1945 (with Jack Hicks, James D. Houston and Maxine Hong Kingston, eds., University of California Press, 2000)
- African American Literature: A Brief Introduction and Anthology (HarperCollins College Publishers, 1996)
- Yardbird Lives! (co-edited with Ishmael Reed, Grove Press, 1978)

=== Screenplays ===
- Sparkle (1972), for the Robert Stigwood Organisation (RSO)
- Nigger (1972), for Joseph Strick and Laser Films, Inc., based on Dick Gregory's autobiography
- A Piece of the Action (1977), for Sidney Poitier and Verdon Productions, starring Bill Cosby
- Bustin' Loose (1981), starring Richard Pryor, Cicely Tyson
