= The Scarecrow (1985 film) =

Matarsak
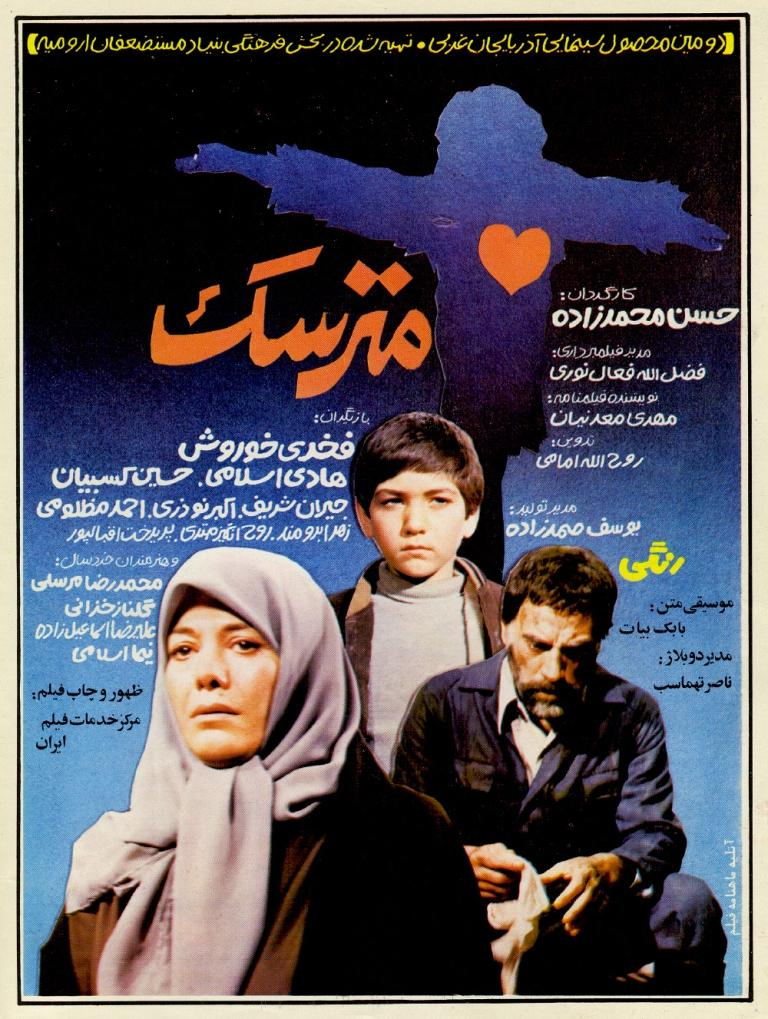
- Directed by: Hassan Mohammadzadeh
- Written by: Mehdi Ma'danian
- Cinematography: Fazlollah Kaal Nouri
- Edited by: Ruhollah Emami
- Music by: Babak Bayat
- Production companies: Cultural Department of the West Azerbaijan, Mostazafan Foundation
- Release date: 1985
- Running time: 95 minutes
- Country: Iran
- Language: Persian

Matarsak (The Scarecrow) is a 1985 Iranian film, directed by Hassan Mohammadzadeh and written by Mehdi Ma'danian. The film was the first to win the Best Film prize at the Fajr Film Festival, which commenced after the Iranian Revolution. The performances of Mohammad Reza Morseli in a juvenile role and Jeyran Sharif in a supporting role received acclaim and awards, with Morseli winning Best Young Actor and Sharif winning Supporting actress.
