= Horizon (1989 film) =

- Directed by: Rasool Mollagholipoor
- Written by: Rasool Mallagholipoor
- Produced by: Jahanbakhsh Soltani
- Release date: 1989
- Running time: 100 minutes
- Country: Iran
- Language: Persian

Horizon (Persian: Ofogh) is a 1989 film by the Iranian director Rasool Mollagholipoor. Mollagholipoor also scripted the film. Set during the Iran-Iraq war, Horizon is an example of Sacred Defence cinema. It starred among others Jahanbakhsh Soltani, Ali Sajjadi Hosseini and Mehrzad Nooshiravan.
