= Bodyguard (2016 film) =

2016 Iranian film

- Persian: بادیگارد
- Directed by: Ebrahim Hatamikia
- Written by: Ebrahim Hatamikia
- Produced by: Ehsan Muhammad Hasani
- Starring: Parviz Parastui; Merila Zarei; Babak Hamidian; Amir Aghaei
- Cinematography: Mahmoud Kalari
- Edited by: Mehdi Hosseinivand
- Music by: Karan Homayounfar
- Production company: Owj Arts and Media organization
- Distributed by: Filmiran (Iran)
- Release date: February 11, 2016 (Fajr)
- Running time: 105 minutes
- Country: Iran
- Language: Persian

Bodyguard (Persian: بادیگارد) is a 2016 Iranian film about a middle-aged man who protects high-ranking political figures in Iran. The film is written and directed by Iranian film director Ebrahim Hatamikia. The film was first shown in the 34th Fajr International Film Festival. Parviz Parastoui, Merila Zarei, and Babak Hamidian star in the movie. It is produced by Ehsan Muhammad Hasani.

== Synopsis ==
Bodyguard is the story of a middle-aged man who protects high-ranking political figures. However, he gets into trouble when a suicide bomber wearing an explosive vest approaches the vice president. The director of the film stated "some motifs in Bodyguard to recollect his 1999 hit The Glass Agency."

== Cast ==
- Parviz Parastoui
- Merila Zarei
- Babak Hamidian
- Mahmud Azizi
- Amir Aghaei
- Farhad Ghaemian
- Diba Zahedi
- Pedram Sharifi
- Kamran Najafzadeh

== Awards and nominations ==
The awards the film won and was nominated for at the 34th Fajr International Film Festival include:

Year	Award	Category	Recipient	Result
2016	Fajr International Film Festival	Best Actor	Parviz Parastouee	Won
2016	Fajr International Film Festival	Best Music	Karan Homayounfar	Nominated
2016	Fajr International Film Festival	Best Filmography	Mahmoud Kalari	Nominated
2016	Fajr International Film Festival	Best visual effects	Hadi Eslami	Won
2016		Best films according to audiences view	Ehsan Mohammad Hassani	Second
2016		Best voice	Bahman Ardalan and Seyyed Alireza Alavian	Nominated

The film nominated in four categories at Madrid International Film Festival:

Year	Award	Category	Recipient	Result
2017	Madrid International Film Festival	Best Foreign Film	Ehsan Mohammad Hasani	Nominated
2017	Madrid International Film Festival	Best Actor	Parviz Parastouee	Nominated
2017	Madrid International Film Festival	Best Supporting Actor	Babak Hamidian	Nominated
2017	Madrid International Film Festival	Best Editing	Mehdi Husseinvand	Nominated

At the 2nd Vienna Independent Film Festival the film won the following awards:

Year	Award	Category	Recipient	Result
2017	VIFF Vienna Independent Film Festival	Best Feature Film	Ebrahim Hatamikia	Nominated
2017	VIFF Vienna Independent Film Festival	Best Director	Ebrahim Hatamikia	Won
2017	VIFF Vienna Independent Film Festival	Best Supporting Actor	Babak Hamidian	Won
2017	VIFF Vienna Independent Film Festival	Best Art Direction	Ebrahim Hatamikia	Won

Other Awards:

- Winner of the Special Award for Directing at the 10th Iranian Film Critics Festival.
