= Jan-bazan =

Jan-bazan is an Iranian war film directed by Nasser Mohammadi and written by Hossein Omrani. Released in 1981, it is a very early example of Sacred Defence cinema, or cinema about the Iran-Iraq war.
