= The Eclipse (Iranian film) =

The (Lunar) Eclipse (Persian: Khosoof) is a 1992 film by the Iranian director Rasool Mollagholipoor. Mollagholipoor also scripted the film which starred Hamid Abdolmaleki, Fariborz Arabnia and Mahmoud Basiri.
