= Jeyran Sharif =

Iranian actress

Jeyran Sharif (Persian: جیران شریف) is an Iranian actress. She is best known for her role in films such as Matarsak (The Scarecrow), for which she won a Best Supporting Actress prize at the Fajr International Film Festival, and the war drama Hesar (Fence).

== See also ==
- List of Iranian actresses
