= The Scout (1989 film) =

- Directed by: Ebrahim Hatamikia
- Written by: Ebrahim Hatamikia
- Starring: Gholamreza Ali Akbari Mehrdad Solaymani
- Release date: 1989
- Running time: 75 minutes
- Country: Iran
- Language: Persian

The Scout (Persian: دیده‌بان, romanized: Deedeh-ban) is a 1989 film by the Iranian director Ebrahim Hatamikia. Hatamikia also scripted the film, which starred Gholamreza Ali Akbari and Mehrdad Solaymani. Set during the Iran-Iraq war, it is an example of Sacred Defense cinema, a genre of Iranian films depicting the Iran–Iraq War's impact on Iran.
