= Minoo Moallem =

- Born: Iran
- Education: University of Tehran, Université de Montréal
- Occupations: Educator, author, scholar
- Known for: Transnational and postcolonial feminist studies, religious nationalism and transnationalism, consumer culture, immigration and diaspora studies, Middle Eastern Studies and Iranian films, cultural politics

Minoo Moallem is an Iranian-born American educator, author, and scholar. She is a Professor of Gender and Women’s Studies at the University of California at Berkeley. Her academic specialties are transnational and postcolonial feminist studies, religious nationalism and transnationalism, consumer culture, immigration and diaspora studies, Middle Eastern Studies and Iranian films, cultural politics. She is best known for her work on Islamic nationalism and fundamentalism as byproducts of colonial modernity and modernization of patriarchies.

She has been the director of media Studies at UC Berkeley since 2017. She was Chair of Gender and Women’s Studies Department at Berkeley from 2008 to 2010; and Chair of the Women’s and Gender Studies Department at San Francisco State University from 2001 to 2006.

== Biography ==
She received a B.A. degree in Sociology, followed by a M.A. degree in Sociology from the University of Tehran. She received a PhD in Sociology from Université de Montréal in 1990, with a thesis "La pluralité des rapports sociaux: similarité et différence: le cas des Iraniennes et des Iraniens au Québec" She then engaged in postdoctoral studies at the University of California at Berkeley.

Before coming to Berkeley, she was a Professor in the Women’s and Gender Studies Department at San Francisco State University from 1996 to 2006, during which time she served as Chair of the department from 2001 to 2006.

== Publications ==
- Between Warrior Brother and Veiled Sister: Islamic Fundamentalism and the Cultural Politics of Patriarchy in Iran, University of California Press, 2005, According to WorldCat, the book is held in 1157 libraries
  - Review, by Azadeh Kian-Thiebaut The Middle East Journal. 60, no. 2, (2006): 383
  - Review, by M Derayeh, The American journal of Islamic social sciences. 25, no. 2, (2008): 126-127
  - Review, by N C Moruzzi International Journal of Middle East Studies, 39, no. 1, (2007): 128-130
  - Review, by N Gerodetti, British Journal of Middle Eastern Studies, 28, Part 2 (2001): 245-246
  - Review, by Roksana Bahramitash, Iranian Studies, v39 n4 (20061201): 597-600
  - Review, by Mitra Rastegar, The Arab Studies Journal, v13/14 n2/1 (20051001): 182-185
- co-editor (with Caren Kaplan and Norma Alarcon) of Between Woman and Nation: Nationalisms, Transnational Feminisms and The State], Duke University Press, 1999 According to WorldCat, the book is held in 440 libraries
  - Review, by Natalia Gerodetti, British Journal of Middle Eastern Studies, v28 n2 (20011101): 245-247
- Krooth, Richard, and Minoo Moallem. The Middle East: A Geopolitical Study of the Region in the New Global Era. Jefferson, N.C.: McFarland & Co, 1995.
  - Review, by Gerald Blake, The Geographical Journal, v163 n1 (19970301): 94
- Guest editor of a special issue of Comparative Studies of South Asia, Africa and the Middle East on Iranian immigrants, exiles and refugees. She is also the author of numerous book chapters and articles.

She has published articles in feminist journals including Signs: Journal of Women in Culture and Society, Feminist Studies, Meridians: feminism, race, and transnationalism, Nimeye Digar, Documentation Sur La Recherche Feministe, "The Scholar $ Feminist Online" and Journal of Feminist Studies of Religion.

Her digital project, "Nation-on-the Move" (with design by Eric Loyer) was published in Vectors: Journal of Culture and Technology in a Dynamic Vernacular (Special issue on Difference.
