= Low Heights =

- video cover
- ارتفاع پست
- Directed by: Ebrahim Hatamikia
- Release date: May 2002 (Iran)
- Running time: 115 minutes
- Country: Iran
- Language: Persian

Low Heights (in Persian: ارتفاع پست, transliteration: Ertefa'e Past) is a 2002 Iranian thriller film directed by Ebrahim Hatamikia and starring Hamid Farrokhnezhad, Leila Hatami, Amir Aghaei, Reza Shafiee Jam, and Gohar Kheirandish. It was written by Hatamikia and Asghar Farhadi.

== Plot ==
Ghasem, together with his wife Narges, his mother and other relatives, takes a flight to Bandar Abbas, Iran. He seeks to get hired by an industrial company. Since the conditions of work and life are hardly satisfactory, everyone accepts the auspicious invitation. Narges is the only one who knows the true intentions of her husband. Once the plane has taken off and reached cruising altitude, Ghasem takes out a gun, disarms the only flight marshal, threatens the pilot and requires a change of destination to Dubai. While Ghasem is distracted by internal altercations, a second security guard, who till then had been taken for a passenger, leaps at the hijacker and snatches his gun. As the plane again heads for the planned destination, a new maneuver conducted by Narges succeeds in grabbing the gun and the hijackers once again redirect the plane to Dubai. Short of fuel, the plane ends up crashing into the water in the middle of nowhere.

The story is partly based on a true event which happened on December 13, 2000, when three members of an extended family of 23 tried to hijack a plane during an Iranian domestic flight. That flight however landed safely and the hijackers' actions failed because of the timely reaction of the flight guards. The initial verdicts of death penalty and life imprisonment for the main culprits were later commuted to lengthy prison sentences.

== Cast ==
- Hamid Farokhnezhad
- Leila Hatami
- Gohar Kheirandish
- Reza Shafiei Jam
- Amir Aghaei
- Mehdi Saki
- Mohammad Ali Inanlou
- Shahram Ghaedi
