= The Immigrant (1990 film) =

1990 Iranian film by Ebrahim Hatamikia

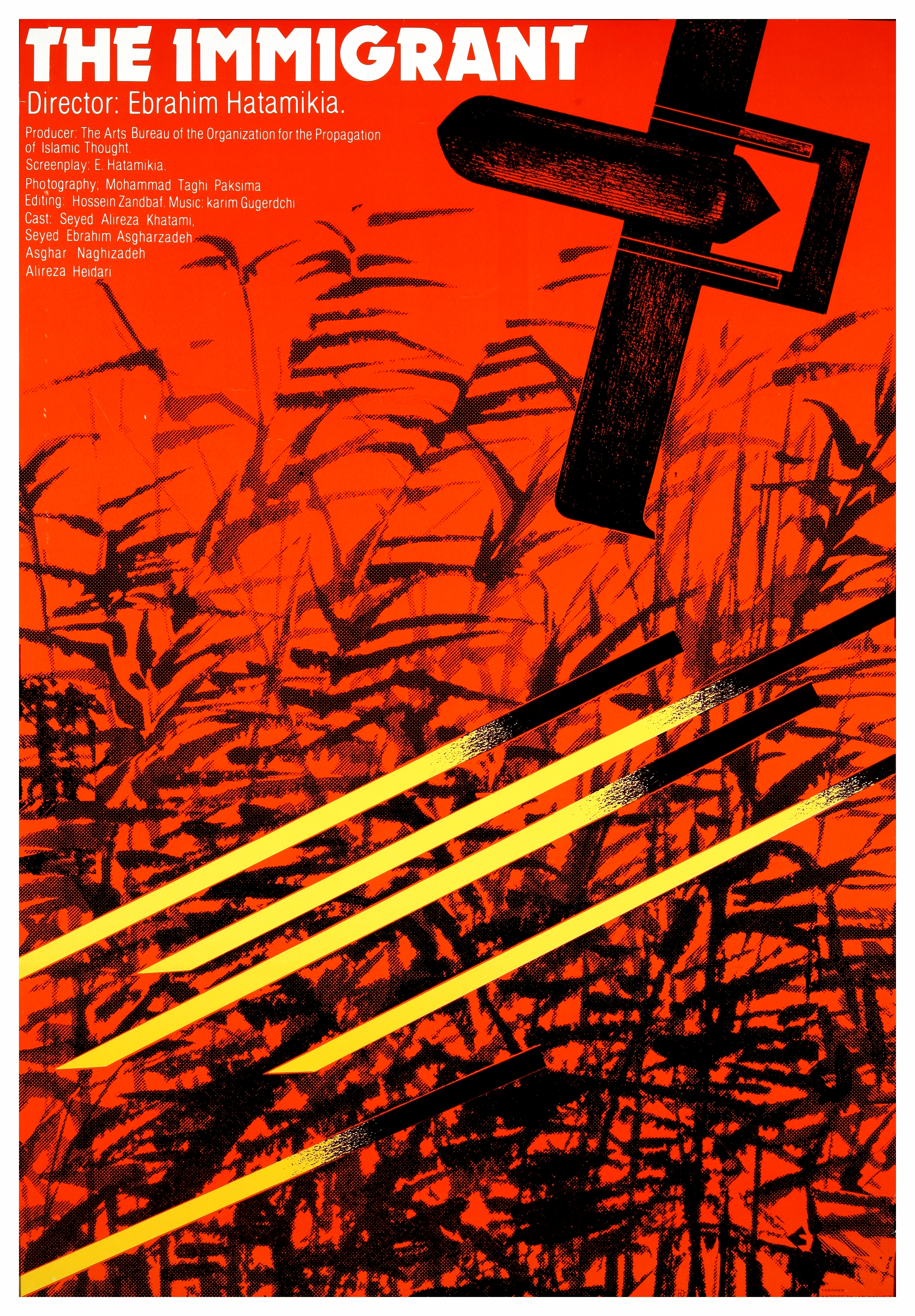
- English version poster
- Directed by: Ebrahim Hatamikia
- Written by: Ebrahim Hatamikia
- Screenplay by: Ebrahim Hatamikia
- Produced by: Islamic Propagation Organization's Artistic Center
- Cinematography: Mohammad-Taghi Pak-Sima
- Edited by: Hossein Zandbaf
- Music by: Karim Gougerdchi
- Release date: 1 February 1990 (Fajr)
- Running time: 95 minutes
- Country: Iran
- Language: Persian

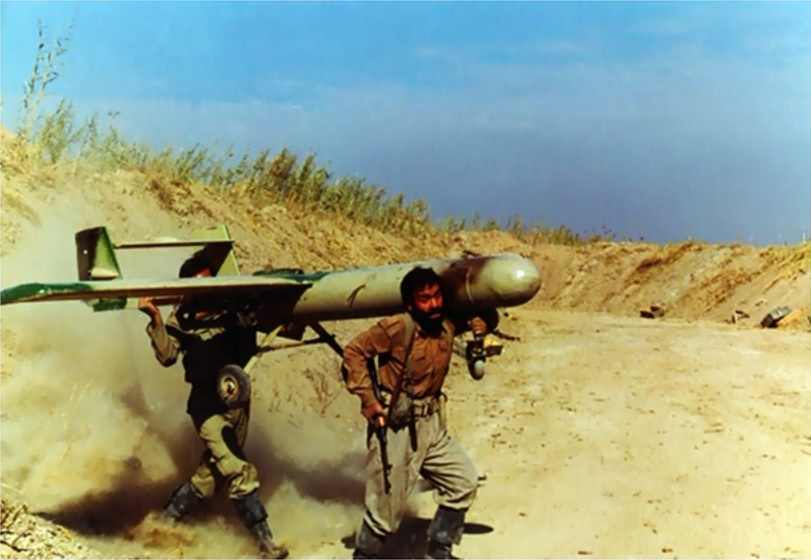
Asghar Naghizadeh with a Qods Mohajer in The Immigrant.

The Immigrant (Persian: مهاجر, romanized: Mohājer) is a 1990 Iranian film by the director Ebrahim Hatamikia. The movie is set in the Mesopotamian Marshes during the Iran–Iraq War, and is a fictional look at the deployment of the early generation of Qods Mohajer drone fighters on the battlefield. The movie was a critical success upon its release in 1990, and won the Crystal Simorgh award for best film (one of five Hatamikia films to win that award). Today, The Immigrant is seen as a milestone in the development of the Iranian film genre known as Sacred Defense cinema, which depicts the Iran–Iraq War's impact on Iran.

== Cast ==
- Seyed Ali Reza Khatami - Asad
- Seyed Ebrahim Asgharzadeh - Mahmoud
- Ali Reza Heydari - Ghafour
- Asghar Naghizadeh - The Guide
- Gholamreza Ali Akbari - Raoufi
