= In the Name of the Father (2006 film) =

2006 Iranian film by Ebrahim Hatamikia

- Directed by: Ebrahim Hatamikia
- Written by: Ebrahim Hatamikia
- Produced by: Mohammad pirhadi
- Starring: Parviz Parastui; Golshifteh Farahani; Mahtab Nasirpour
- Cinematography: Hassan Karimi
- Edited by: Sohrab Khosravi
- Music by: Mohammadreza Aligholi
- Release date: 20 January 2006
- Running time: 105 minutes
- Country: Iran
- Language: Persian

In the Name of the Father (Persian: به نام پدر, romanized: Be Name Pedar) is a 2006 film by the Iranian director Ebrahim Hatamikia. Hatamikia also wrote the script for the film, which was lensed by Hassan Karimi. Parviz Parastui, Mahtab Nasirpour, Golshifteh Farahani starred in the principal roles.

The film won the Crystal Simorgh for best film at the Fajr Film Festival. Parastui and Nasirpour also won the best actor and best actress awards, respectively.

== Plot ==
The film is about the relationship between a Basiji father and his young daughter, who were injured by land mines left over from the Iran–Iraq War.

== Cast ==
- Parviz Parastui
- Golshifteh Farahani as Habibeh
- Mahtab Nasirpour as Raheleh
- Kambiz Dirbaz
- Mehrdad Ziai
- Afshin Hashemi
- Mirtaher Mazloumi
- Kazem HajirAzad
- Shabnam Moghaddami
