= The Scent of Joseph's Shirt =

1995 Iranian film by Ebrahim Hatamikia

- Directed by: Ebrahim Hatamikia
- Written by: Ebrahim Hatamikia
- Screenplay by: Ebrahim Hatamikia; Dariush Moaddabian
- Produced by: Majid Modarresi
- Starring: Ali Nasirian; Ebrahim Hatamikia; Hasan Pourshirazi; Niki Karimi; Shirin Bina
- Music by: Majid Entezami
- Release date: 1995 (Fajr)
- Country: Iran
- Language: Persian

The Scent of Joseph's Shirt (Persian: بوی پیراهن یوسف, romanized: Buy Pirâhan Yusof) is a 1995 war and drama film written and directed by Ebrahim Hatamikia, Iranian director, who is described as " one of the most outstanding directors of war genre." The film focuses on the prisoners of war of the 1980-1988 Iran–Iraq War. In an interview, Hatamikia said that the film portrays his perception of the concept of the reappearance of Muhammad al-Mahdi.

== Plot ==
Daei Ghafoor is a taxi driver whose son is said to have been killed during the Iran–Iraq War, but in his heart he still believes that his son is alive. Despite all the evidence pointing to the death of his son, Yousef, he still is waiting for his return. One day, Daei Ghafoor meets a woman, Shirin, at the airport. Shirin has returned to Iran from Europe to find her brother, Khosrow, a missing soldier in the war. Both begin looking for their loved ones.

== Cast ==
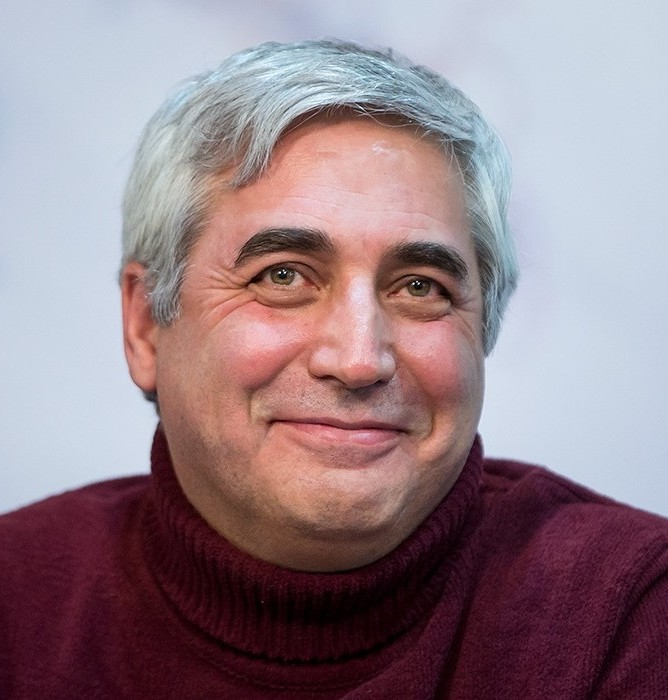
Ebrahim Hatamikia, director and writer of The Scent of Joseph's Shirt

The following actors played role in the film:

- Ali Nasirian
- Hasan Pourshirazi
- Jafar Dehghan
- Niki Karimi
- Shirin Bina

== Reception ==
In an interview, Ebrahim Hatamikia said he was asked why he would not make a film on Imam Mahdi, a question to which he replied: "I have created that; The Scent of Joseph's Shirt! ...it was the movie portraying my perception of the awaiting concept." According to Shahram Jafarinejad, a film critic, The Scent of Joseph's Shirt deals with awaiting and awaiters. Mohammad Ghouchani, Iranian journalist, said: "...no movie had been able to portray the concept of awaiting as much as The Scent of Joseph's Shirt did... ."

The Scent of Joseph's Shirt is the first "female-centric movie" by Hatamikia and features a "strong female central character".

== Music ==
The film score is produced by Majid Entezami, Iranian composer, and musician.
