= In Amethyst Color =

- Directed by: Ebrahim Hatamikia
- Written by: Ebrahim Hatamikia
- Produced by: Jamal Sadatian
- Starring: Hamid Farrokhnezhad; Khazar Ma'ssumi; Kourosh Tahami; Farhad Ghaemian
- Cinematography: Hassan Karimi
- Edited by: Ebrahim Hatamikia; Sohrab Khosravi
- Music by: Fardin Khalatbari
- Distributed by: Boshra Film
- Release dates: February 1, 2005 (Fajr); February 1, 2010 (Fajr); February 17, 2010 (Iran)
- Running time: 97 minutes
- Country: Iran
- Language: Persian

In Amethyst Color (Persian: به رنگ ارغوان, romanized: Be Rang-e Arḡavān) (poor-translated as the In Purple Color and The Color Purple) is a 2005 Iranian drama film directed by Ebrahim Hatamikia and starring Hamid Farokhnezhad and Farhad Ghaemian. Hatamikia won the Crystal Simorgh for Best Director in 2010.

The film was banned from screening in Iran for some years by the order of the Ministry of Intelligence because the film depicts the actions of an undercover Iranian intelligence officer.

== Plot ==
Houshang , an Iranian intelligence officer, arrives in a university town disguising himself as a student. His mission is to monitor Arghavan, a student at the university, whose parents are anti-government. He sets up a hidden camera on the balcony of guesthouse which is opposite to Arghavan's apartment. One day, he enters into Arghavan's room and plants microphones in multiple places. He leaves the room disheveled but Arghavan doesn't file a complaint.

Houshang learns that a fellow student, Mohsen, used to be Arghavan's lover but now they are estranged. He comes close to kill Mohsen after extracting information about Arghavan's parents from him but decides to leave him.

One day, two of Arghavan's father's associates come to her, to kill her father her before he is captured. Houshang had been to listening to her and goes to her apartment and lies to her that her father is waiting at the university and told her that her father told him that he had not sent anyone to her. She leaves to find her father while Houshang kills the female associate and the male escapes after injuring Houshang terribly.

Houshang is wounded and dressing himself in his room when Arghavan shows up. He couldn't go out, so he just opens the window of his room and responds to Arghavan, who is visibly distressed. She wants to talks to Houshang and in the end asks him to meet her as soon as possible. He goes to her apartment after some time and acts surprised on seeing the broken windows and all the mess in her apartment. When she shows him the body of the dead female, he starts acting distressed and says he is going to call the police. Arghavan pleads him to not do that as that will put her in trouble and asks him to help her get rid of it. Houshang helps her bury the body in a remote area in the middle of the night.

Another day, Arghavan receives a phone call from her father and when she asks her why he wasn't at the university, he responds that he was never there and tells her that her phone is being tapped. Houshang had been listening to this entire conversation. Arghavan also understands that Houshang is with the Iranian intelligence.

Houshang protects Arghavan when her father comes to town and gets killed by the intelligence. He goes beyond his duty and has fallen in love with her. Arghavan is captured by the intelligence as well.

In the final scene, some time after their last meeting, Houshang shows up, as a cameraperson, at a protest which Arghavan is a part of. Their eyes meet and she recognizes him. We see that secret photographs are being taken of the two from a distance and somewhere an intelligence person is writing a report about both of them.

== Cast ==
- Hamid Farrokhnezhad as Houshang
- Khazar Ma'soomi as Arghavan
- Farhad Ghaemian as Shafaq Kamrani (Arghavan's father)
- Kourosh Tahami as Mohsen
- Seyyed Mehrdad Ziaei
- Behnaz Tavakoli as Balout/Batoul
- Reza Babak as Superior Intelligence Officer
- Mohammad Ali Inanloo as Dean
