= Hamid Reza Zouravand =

Iranian race walker (born 1990)

Personal information
- Born: 13 January 1990 (age 36) Hamedan, Iran

Sport
- Country: Iran
- Sport: Athletics

Hamid Reza Zouravand (Persian: حمیدرضا زورآوند; born 13 January 1990) is an Iranian race walker. He competed in the men's 20 kilometres walk at the 2016 Summer Olympics.
