= Kum-Kum Bhavnani =

India-born American sociologist and filmmaker

Kum-Kum Bhavnani is a university professor, filmmaker, and author. As of 2018, she is a professor of Sociology and Distinguished Professor with Feminist Studies and Global and International Studies at the University of California, Santa Barbara, where she is Chair of the interdisciplinary program in Women, Culture, Development. She served as the Chair (2019–20) of the University of California Academic Senate.

In 2006, Bhavnani premiered first feature-length documentary, The Shape of Water, based on her research in Senegal, Brazil, India, and Jerusalem. It is narrated by Susan Sarandon. Bhavnani premiered Nothing Like Chocolate in 2012, and Lutah in 2014. Bhavnani is the founder and director of Mirror Hammer Films.

== Background and education ==
Born in India and raised in London, Bhavnani completed her first degree, a B.Sc. (Hons.) in Psychology at the University of Bristol. She completed her M.A. in Child and Educational Psychology at the University of Nottingham. Her Ph.D. (1983–1987) was awarded in 1988 by Cambridge University (King's College). She came to the University of California Santa Barbara in 1991.

== Publications ==
Bhavnani's books and co-edited volumes include Talking Politics (Cambridge University Press), Feminism and ‘Race’ (Oxford University Press), Feminist Futures (Zed Press), and On the Edges of Development (Routledge). She was also the inaugural editor for Meridians: feminism, race, transnationalism from 2000–2002 at Smith College, Massachusetts.

== Filmography ==
Year	Film	Writer	Director	Producer
2006	The Shape of Water	✓	✓	✓
2012	Nothing Like Chocolate	✓	✓	✓
2014	Lutah - A Passion for Architecture: A Life in Design	✓	✓	✓
2018	We Are Galapagos	✓	✓	✓
