= Persis Karim =

American poet, educator, editor (born 1962)

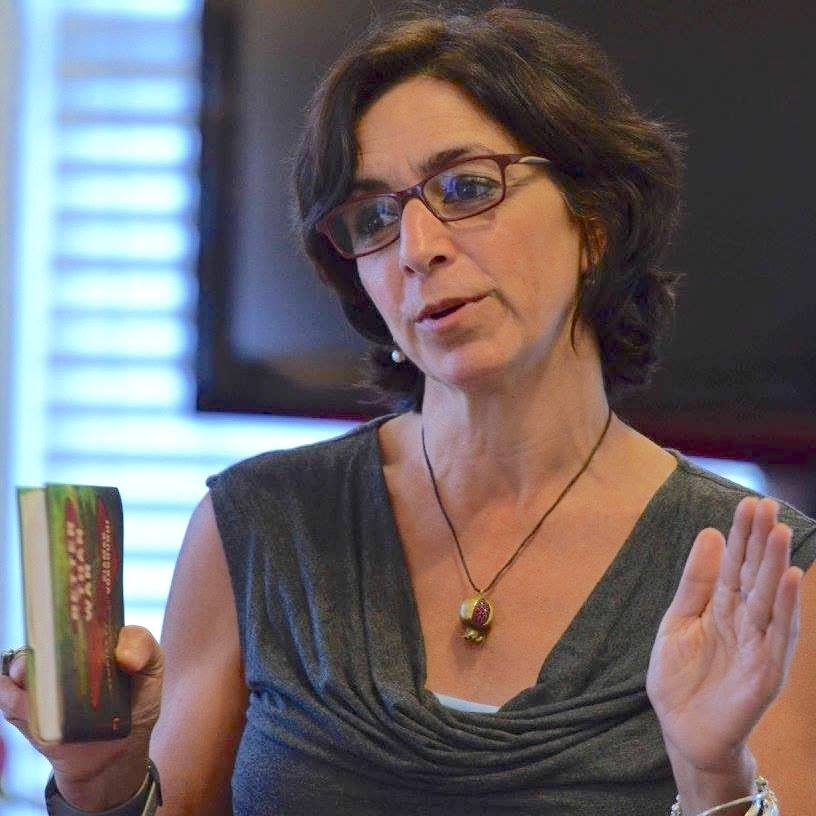
- Karim in 2016
- Born: Persis Maryam Karim; 1962 (age 63–64); Walnut Creek, California, U.S.
- Education: University of California, Santa Cruz, University of Texas at Austin
- Occupations: Poet, editor, educator
- Known for: Iranian Diaspora Studies, Iranian American Studies
- Website: persiskarim.com

Persis Maryam Karim (born 1962) is an American poet, essayist, editor, and educator. Her work focuses on Iranians living outside of Iran, specifically Iranian Americans, and their complicated histories and identities which is often presented through storytelling. She served as the Neda Nobari Distinguished Chair and director of the Center for Iranian Diaspora Studies at San Francisco State University (SFSU) from 2017 to 2025.

== Biography ==
Persis Maryam Karim was born in 1962 in Walnut Creek, California. Her father was an Iranian, born in Paris; her mother was French and had immigrated from Dijon, France. She was the youngest child in her family (with six siblings and two half siblings), and was raised in the San Francisco Bay Area.

Karim attended the University of California, Santa Cruz (BA 1985), and University of Texas at Austin (PhD 1998, comparative literature). She had studied under poet Al Young.

Karim is known for editing anthologies and sharing the stories of Iranian-Americans, including A World Between: Poems, Short Stories, and Essays by Iranian-Americans (1999) and Tremors: New Fiction by Iranian American Writers (2013). From 1999 until 2017, Karim worked at San José State University, where she was a co-director of its Persian Studies Program.

Karim and Soumyaa K. Behrnes co-directed the documentary film The Dawn is Too Far: Stories of Iranian-American Life (2024), which follows the Iranian diaspora community in the San Francisco Bay Area from the 1950s until present day.

The Center for Iranian Diaspora Studies is scheduled to close in 2025.

== Publications ==
- Karim, Persis Maryam (1993). The Search for History in Persian Fiction: The Case of Simin Daneshvar's Savushun. University of Texas at Austin.
- Karim, Persis Maryam (1998). Fissured Nations and Exilic States: Displacement, Exile, and Diaspora in Twentieth-century Writing by Women (dissertation). University of Texas at Austin.
- Karim, Persis M.; Khorrami, Mohammad Mehdi (1999). A World Between: Poems, Short Stories, and Essays by Iranian-Americans. George Braziller. ISBN 9780807614457.
- Karim, Persis M. (2006). Let Me Tell You Where I've Been: New Writing by Women of the Iranian Diaspora. Al Young (Forward). University of Arkansas Press. ISBN 9781557288202.
- Amirrezvani, Anita; Karim, Persis, eds. (2013). Tremors: New Fiction by Iranian American Writers. University of Arkansas Press. ISBN 9781610755191.

=== Contributions ===
- Parsipur, Shahrnush (2004). Women Without Men: A Novel of Modern Iran. Persis M. Karim (Afterword), Kamran Talattof (Translator), Jocelyn Sharlet (Translator). Feminist Press at the City University of New York. ISBN 9781558614529.
- Karim, Persis (2018-08-29). "Iranians Have Always Lived Limbo in the United States. Now it is Chaos". The Washington Post. ISSN 2641-9599.

== See also ==
- List of Iranian women writers
