= Kamran Najafzadeh =

Iranian television presenter

- Born: Kamran Najafzadeh; 19 May 1979 (age 47); Tehran, Iran
- Education: Agricultural engineering
- Alma mater: Islamic Azad University of Karaj
- Years active: 2002–present
- Children: Amirkian Najafzadeh

Kamran Najafzadeh (Persian: کامران نجف‌زاده) is an Iranian journalist, reporter and television presenter .

== Early life ==
Kamran Najafzadeh was born on 19 May 1979 in Tehran's Sattarkhan neighborhood. He is married and has one son. He has a bachelors degree in Genetic Engineering and a masters degree in Theater.

== Career ==
Prior to entering Iranian television, Kamran Najafzadeh was a journalist at a number of newspapers including Arman and Keyhan Sports. He currently hosts a TV show where he speaks to actors, poets, singers, artists, athletes, politicians, etc.

He has reported from many countries from all around the world and was Iran's designated corespondent in the United Nations in New York. He is also known for his journalism in active war zones in different countries.

Kamran is also an ambassador for children and elderly in need of care. As well as an ambassador for rare diseases.

== Reactions to interviews ==
He did a short one-liner interview with Lionel Messi during the time he was in France. He was registered as a candidate for Iran's parliament.
