= Pedram Khosronejad =

Iranian anthropologist (born 1969)

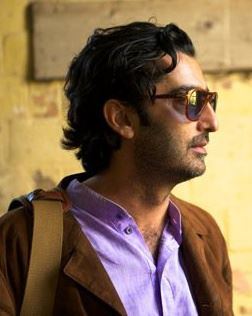
- Born: Pedram Khosronejad; 2 April 1969 (age 57); Tehran, Iran

Academic background
- Education: University of Tehran; Ecole Pratique des Hautes Etudes; École des Hautes Études en Sciences Sociales
- Thesis: Les Lions en Pierre Sculptés chez les Bakhtiâri : Description et Significations de Sculptures Zoomorphes dans une Société Tribale du Sud-ouest de l'Iran (2007)
- Doctoral advisor: Thierry Zarcone

Academic work
- Discipline: Social anthropology and Visual anthropology

Pedram Khosronejad (Persian: پدرام خسرونژاد; born 1969) is a socio-cultural and visual anthropologist of contemporary Iran. He is of Iranian origin and commenced his studies in painting (B.A. University of Art, Tehran, Iran) and in Visual Art Research (M.A. University of Art, Tehran, Iran) before moving to France with a Ph.D. grant in 2000. He obtained his D.E.A. (Diplome d’Etudes Approfondies) at Ecole Pratique des Hautes Etudes (Sorbonne, Paris) and obtained his Ph.D. at the École des Hautes Études en Sciences Sociales (Paris). His research interests include cultural and social anthropology, the anthropology of death and dying, visual anthropology, visual piety, holy artifacts, and religious material culture, with a particular interest in Iran, Persianate societies and the Islamic world.

Since July 2020, Khosronejad has been curator of Persian Arts at the Powerhouse Museum, Sydney, Australia;'an adjunct professor at the Religion and Society Research Cluster in School of Social Sciences at Western Sydney University; and a fellow at the Department of Anthropology at Harvard University.

Between 2015 and 2019, Khosronejad was the Farzaneh Family Scholar and associate director for Iranian and Persian Gulf Studies at the School of International Studies/School of Media&Strategic Communications of Oklahoma State University, U.S.

Between 2007 and 2015, he held the position of Goli Rais Larizadeh Fellow of the Iran Heritage Foundation for the Anthropology of Iran in the Department of Social Anthropology at the University of St Andrews. Since its creation, this full-time academic position remained the only academic appointment in Europe and the West dedicated entirely to the anthropology of Iran. He is chair of The Anthropology of the Middle East and Central Eurasia Network of the European Association of Social Anthropologists.

== German Civilian Expatriates of Persia & WWII ==
Since August 2019, Khosronejad has been working on a groundbreaking interdisciplinary research project regarding the German Civilian Expatriates of Persia (Iran), Australians who had been detained with their parents in Iran in 1941 after the country's invasion by the British and Soviet Armies during the Second World War. This project concerns the life stories of 512 German civilian internees who were detained in Australian internment camps and their contribution to the field of Iranian Studies and also to the development of Australia after the war period. It is astonishing to learn that Dr. Hans Eberhard Wulff the author of The Traditional Crafts of Persia, Prof. Wilhelm Max Eilers great orientalist and archaeologist, and Karl Jan Zoubek, professor of music at the University of Tehran, was among them.
