= Mohammad Mehdi Khorrami =

Mohammad Mehdi Khorrami is a literary critic, writer and Iranologist.

He studied Persian and French literatures in the University of Texas at Austin and he received his PhD in 1996. Currently he teaches Persian language and literature at New York University. His research is focused on the literary characteristics of contemporary Persian fiction and classical Persian poetry. He is also a specialist in Persian literature in migration.

== Publications ==
- Karim, Persis M.; Khorrami, Mohammad Mehdi (1999). A World Between: Poems, Short Stories, and Essays by Iranian-Americans. George Braziller. ISBN 9780807614457.

== See also ==
- Iranology
- Persian literature
