= Richard Peña =

Professor of Professional Practice at the Columbia University School of The Arts

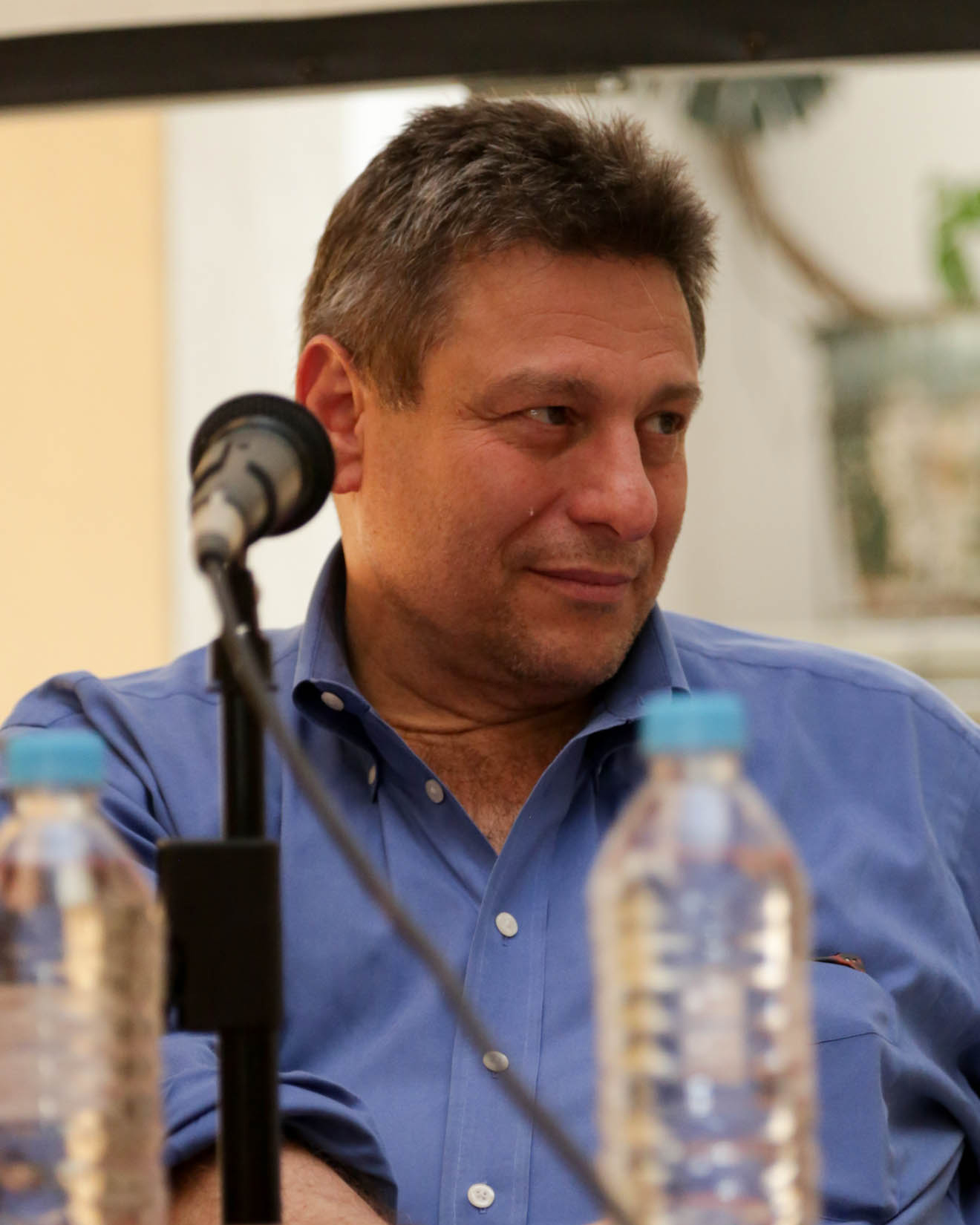
- Peña in 2013
- Born: 1953 (age 71–72); New York City, New York, U.S.
- Occupations: Film critic, educator, and program and festival director
- Family: Married, three children

Richard Peña (born 1953) is a Professor of Professional Practice at the Columbia University School of The Arts. He was formerly program director of Film at Lincoln Center, organizers of the New York Film Festival and the New Directors/New Films Festival.

== Early life and education ==
Peña is the son of Spanish and Puerto Rican parents. He was raised in New York City. He earned a bachelor's degree at Harvard University and a Master's degree in film from the Massachusetts Institute of Technology.

== Career ==
Peña taught at the University of California Berkeley before joining the Film Center at the Art Institute of Chicago as a film curator. In 1988, he joined the Film Society of Lincoln Center as the director of programming. At the Film Society, Peña organized retrospectives of Michelangelo Antonioni, Sacha Guitry, Iranian director Abbas Kiarostami, Robert Aldrich, Wojciech Has, Youssef Chahine, Yasujirō Ozu, and Amitabh Bachchan, as well as film series devoted to African, Taiwanese, Polish, Hungarian, Arab, Cuban and Argentine cinema.

In the wake of the September 11, 2001 attacks on the World Trade Center, Peña was involved in the controversy over Abbas Kiarostami, who was refused a US immigration visa to attend the festival because of his Iranian roots. Peña had invited Kiarostami to the festival. In the event Peña stated: "It's a terrible sign of what's happening in my country today that no one seems to realize or care about the kind of negative signal this sends out to the entire Muslim world."

From 2001 to 2002, Peña was the host of Sundance Channel's Conversations in World Cinema, on which he interviewed Harmony Korine among other filmmakers. Since 1996, he has organized together with Unifrance Film the annual "Rendez-Vous with French Cinema Today" program. He is also responsible for creating the annual New York Jewish Film Festival.

Peña is a Professor of Professional Practice in the Film Department at Columbia University, where he specializes in film theory and international cinema and founded the Columbia University MA program in Film Studies: History, Theory and Criticism (HTC). He resigned from his posts as the Film Society of Lincoln Center's Program Director (after 25 years) and as the head of the NYFF Selection Committee and as of 2012 was to be organizing a new educational initiative for the film society.

== Honors ==
He was honored at the 2013 Jerusalem Film Festival and held a discussion with Mohsen Makhmalbaf after the screening of The Gardener about the power of cinema.

== Personal life ==
He resides in his hometown, New York City, with his wife. He has three children.
