= Shahriar Bahrani =

Iranian director

Shahriar Bahrani شهریار بحرانی
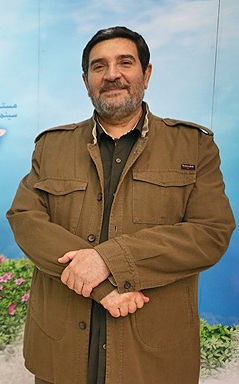
- Born: 1951; Tehran, Iran
- Occupation: Director

Shahriar Bahrani (Persian: شهریار بحرانی) is an Iranian director.

== Selected filmography ==
- 2009: The Kingdom of Solomon
- 2000: Saint Mary
- 1997: Inverted world
- 1993: The Attack on H-3 (based on the H-3 airstrike)
- 1989: Don't Muddy the Water!

...
