= Rasoul Mollagholipour =

Iranian filmmaker

Rasoul Mollagholipour رسول ملاقلی‌پور
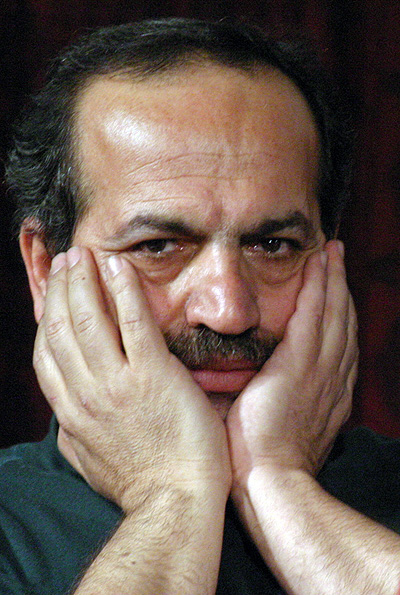
- Born: 9 September 1955; Tehran, Iran
- Died: 6 March 2007 (aged 51); Noshahr, Iran
- Occupation: Filmmaker
- Years active: 1983–2007

Rasoul Mollagholipour (Persian:رسول ملاقلی‌پور; also spelled Rasool Mollagholi Poor; 9 September 1955 – 6 March 2007) was an Iranian film director, screenwriter and cinematographer.

== Career ==
He began his career as a photographer. He directed several short documentaries about the 1980–88 Iran–Iraq War. The film director won critical acclaim for the 16-mm "Neynava".

His movie Mim Mesle Madar (M for Mother, 2006) was a huge success despite its tragic, intense, and shocking scenes. It was selected to represent Iran in the Best Foreign Language Film category at the 2008 Oscars.

He also wrote film scripts and acted as a jury member in Fajr International Film Festival. Afternoon of the 10th Day was his last feature film.

== Films ==
1. Neynava (1983)
2. A Boat to the Beach (1985)
3. The Flight in the Night (1986)
4. The Horizon (1988)
5. Majnoon (1990)
6. Khosoof (1992)
7. The Refugee (1993)
8. Gharche Sammi (The Poisonous Mushroom, 2002)
9. Mim Mesle Madar (2006)
10. Afternoon of the 10th Day (2009 - Unfinished, completed by Mojtaba Raie)

== See also ==
- Iranian cinema
