= Mohammad Reza Delpak =

Iranian sound design

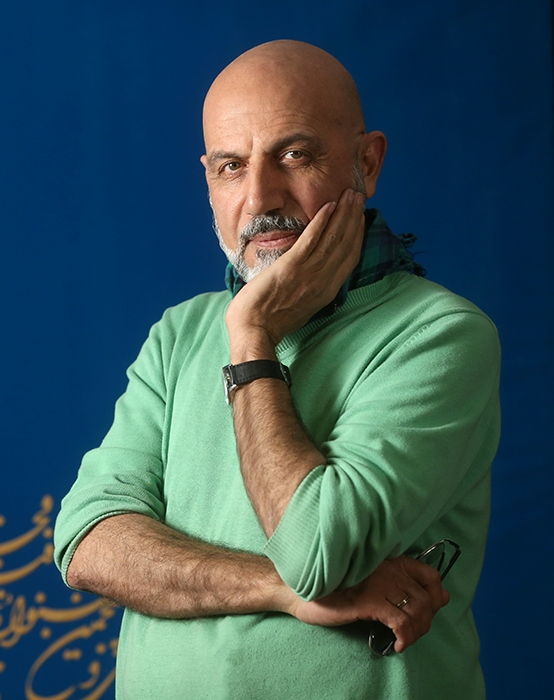
- Born: Tehran, Iran
- Occupations: Sound post production, Department–(Sound designer)-(sound mixing)-(sound editing)
- Years active: 1966–present
- Known for: Taste of Cherry; The Salesman (2016 film); A Separation; Children of Heaven

Mohammad Reza Delpak(Persian: محمدرضا دلپاک (born in Tehran) is a sound Department Cinema of Iran. He is the first sound designer of Iranian cinema.

== Biography ==
Mohammad Reza Delpak was born in Tehran in 1955. He holds a master's degree and an honorary doctorate both in arts. He started his career as a sound designer and sound re-recording mixer in 1974. He initiated the term “Sound Designing” in Iran film industry in 1994 for the first time in “the fateful day” fiction feature film. He has collaborated on over 100 feature fiction films and 45 documentary as a supervisor of sound design and mix. Most of these films have been selected by many international film festivals and received prestigious awards. This includes Cannes film festival, BAFTA, BFI, Berlin international film festival, Venice international film festival, Golden Globe, and Locarno international film festival. He honored by working with world-known Iranian filmmakers, including Abbas Kiarostami, Asghar Farhadi, Majid Majidi, Jafar Panahi, Dariush Mehrjui, and Reza Dormishian. Two of the films he has contributed as supervisor of Sound Designer & mix, the Sales Man, 2016 and A Separation, 2011 both directed by Asghar Farhadi, have been awarded in Oscar Academy as the best foreign language films. The Children of Heaven by Majid Majidi also was nominated in Oscar Academy 1998. He is privileged by receiving several precious national awards namely, the Crystal Simorgh, the Statue of the Cinema House, and a Memorial Statue. Since 2016, he has been a member and jury of the American Academy of Motion Picture Arts and Sciences.

== Filmography ==
- A Hero 2021
- Sun Children 2020
- Sun (supervising sound editor) 2019
- Hava, Maryam, Ayesha (supervising sound editor) 2019
- A man without shadow 2019
- Living 2018
- About The Salesman 2018
- Beyond the Clouds (2017 film) (supervising sound editor) 2017
- Under the Smoky Roof (2017)
- The End Of Dreams (2017)
- Lögndagen (supervising sound editor) 2017
- The Salesman (2016 film) Sound department (Sound Designer) and Mixing 2016
- Lantouri (supervising sound editor) 2016
- Muhammad: The Messenger of God (film) (supervising sound editor) 2015
- Berlin -7º (sound editor)
- Hush! Girls Don't Scream (supervising sound editor) 2013
- I'm Not Angry! (2012)
- Orange Suit (sound mixer) 2012
- Hatred (2012 film)
- Like Someone in Love (film) (Sound Designer) 2012
- The Bear (2012 film) (sound editor) 2012
- Wind and Fog (supervising sound editor) 2011
- A Separation sound designer and sound mixer 2011
- Life with Closed Eyes (supervising sound editor) (2010)
- 40 Years Old (supervising sound editor) (2010)
- Whisper with the Wind (sound mixing) 2009
- About Elly (sound mixing) and (Sound Designer) 2009
- Shirin (film) (supervising sound editor) 2008
- Khak Ashena (supervising sound editor) 2008
- The Song of Sparrows (supervising sound editor) 2008
- Offside (2006 Iranian film) (sound designer) 2006
- Mainline (Khun bazi), 2006
- Pars Sea (supervising sound editor) (2006)
- Zaman mi-istad (sound designer) 2006
- One Night (2005 film) (supervising sound editor) 2005
- Khab-e talkh (sound designer) 2005
- The Willow Tree (sound designer and mixer) 2005
- Tradition of Lover Killing (sound designer) 2004
- Bitter Dream (sound designer and mixer) 2004
- Gilaneh (sound designer and mixer) 2004
- Navel (sound mixer) 2004
- White Nights (sound mixer) 2003
- Letters in the Wind (film) (Production designer) 2002
- Along the wind in the desert alone (2002)
- Zagros (supervising sound editor)
- Baran (Sound Department) 2001
- ABC Africa (Sound Department) 2001
- Sanam (sound designer) 2000
- Birth of a Butterfly (sound designer) 2000
- The Wind Will Carry Us (sound designer) / (sound mixer) 1999
- The Triumphant Warrior (sound mixer) 1999
- A Mother's Love (sound designer) 1999
- The Color of Paradise (sound designer) 1999
- Children of Heaven (supervising sound editor) 1998
- Taste of Cherry (sound designer) 1997
- The Mirror (1997 film) (sound mixing) 1997
- The Father (1996 film) (supervising sound editor) 1996
- Bolandiha-ye sefr (sound) 1993
- Se mard-e aami (sound) 1993
- The Grey City (sound) 1991
- Water, Wind, Dust 1989
- Ma istadeim (sound) 1984
- Kilometr-e 5 (sound) 1982
- Ballad of Tara (sound) 1979
- Prophet Joseph (TV series) (sound designer)
- Qaleh 1966 (Documentary short) (sound mixer)
- Teheran, payetakht-e Iran ast 1966 (Documentary short) (sound mixer)

== Awards ==
- (10 Celorian Fajr 5 Statues of Hafiz and 5 Statues of the Cinema House and 1 Award of the Writers and Critics Association)
- The 14th Cinema House Celebration-
- Fourth Cinema House Celebration; Statue; Best Sounding and Mix; The Long Films Competition; 2000 Under the City
- Crystal Simorgh Best Sound and Wax
- Winner of the 32st Fajr Film Festival Lantouri
- Winner of the 31st Fajr Film Festival - Berlin 7
- Winner of the 16th Fajr Film Festival - Birth of a Butterfly
- Winner of the 20th Fajr Film Festival - Travel to Tomorrow
- Winner of the 17th Fajr Film Festival - The Color of Paradise
- Seventh Winner of Fajr Film Festival - Bear
- Winner of the 27th Fajr International Film Festival - About Elly
- Winner of the 24th Fajr Film Festival - Time is up
- Winner of the 19th Fajr Film Festival - Rain
- I'm not angry at the thirty-second winner of the Fajr Film Festival
- Hafiz Statue; Best Sound; Mohammad Reza Delapak; The 10th Celebration of the World of Pictures; The Cinematic Part of the Game (2007)
