= Hayedeh Safiyari =

Iranian film editor (born 1959)

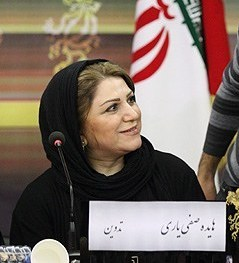
- Safiyari in 2012
- Born: 27 June 1959 (age 67); Gorgan, Golestan province, Iran
- Occupation: Film editor
- Years active: 1981–present
- Notable work: Everybody Knows; The Salesman; A Separation; About Elly
- Spouse: Mohsen Abdolvahab (former)
- Children: Sepideh Abdolvahab

Hayedeh Safiyari (Persian: هایده صفی‌یاری, ; born 27 June 1959 in Gorgan) is an Iranian film editor. In her more than forty years of work, she has collaborated on over 90 feature films and documentaries. She has received four Iranian film awards (Crystal Simorgh Awards) for her work, among other honors and was invited to become a member of the Academy of Motion Picture Arts and Sciences. She is considered one of the most renowned film editors in Iran.

== Career ==
Hayedeh Safiyari graduated in Art Cinema from Iran Broadcasting University in Iran and decided to pursue her professional career in movie editing. She remembers to have discovered her passion for editing when she edited films by other students as part of her thesis. After graduating, she first worked for the Iranian state television, then as a sound editor on one feature film and subsequently on five more.

She became an assistant editor to film director Bahram Beyzai, who edited his own films as well as selected projects for other film directors. While working with him, she received further offers that enabled her to break into the Iranian film industry, Safiyari said in an interview with Filmmaker Magazine.

The majority of the edits she has carried out are for internationally well-acclaimed filmmakers such as Asghar Farhadi, Bahram Beyzai, Bahman Ghobadi, Rakhshan Banietemad, Reza Dormishian, and Pooran Derakhshande. She is best known for her long-time collaborations with Iranian director Asghar Farhadi, including the Oscar-winning A Separation and The Salesman.

Hayedeh Safiyari has received several prestigious awards. Among them are the Crystal Simorgh, the Statue of the Cinema House, the Asian Film Award, the Jury Prize of Iran's film Critics & Writers Association. Two of her films, The Salesman (2016) and A Separation (2011), both directed by Asghar Farhadi, have been awarded with an Academy Award in the category as the Best foreign-language Film. She extended her professional work to many countries, including USA, France, Spain, Italy, Sweaden, and Turkey.

Safiyari has edited over 90 feature fiction films and several documentaries over a span of forty years. Many of these films have been selected by major international film festivals, e. g. among others the Cannes Film Festival, BFI, Berlin International Film Festival, Venice Film Festival, Golden Globe Awards, and the Locarno Film Festival.

In 2023 she was awarded Best Editing in the 6th Asian Film Awards for A Separation.

== Work ==
Hayedeh Safiyari has been working as a film editor since 1981. She works exclusively on arthouse films and is considered one of the most renowned film editors in Iran. From 2021 to 2022, she was invited to be a member of the jury at the Tallinn Black Nights Film Festival in Estonia.

She is best known for her long-standing collaboration with Iranian director Asghar Farhadi, including the Oscar-winning films A Separation and The Salesman.

In the interview book “Asghar Farhadi. Interviews”, Farhadi repeatedly comments on his long-standing collaboration with Hayedeh Safiyari. On average, they developed the rhythm of each film together, which he considers one of the essential elements of his work. Many details of earlier stages of work, from the script to the actual on-set filming, would only be harmonized “... while editing, so the final rhythm passes through the filter of editing.”

== Private Life ==
Hayedeh Safiyari was married to the Iranian screenwriter and film director Mohsen Abdolvahab. Their daughter, Sepideh Abdolvahab, born in 1984, has also been working as a film editor since 2006. She began her career in 2002 as her mother's assistant editor on Asghar Farhadi's film drama A Separation. She subsequently worked with her on other films.

== Filmography (Selection) ==
- 1998: The Glass Agency, Director: Ebrahim Hatamikia
- 1999: The Red Ribbon, Director: Ebrahim Hatamikia
- 2002: Low Heights, Director: Ebrahim Hatamikia
- 2002: Marooned in Iraq, Director: Bahman Ghobadi
- 2004: Turtles Can Fly, Director: Bahman Ghobadi
- 2006: Fireworks Wednesday, Director: Asghar Farhadi
- 2008: Dayere Zangi, Director: Parisa Bakhtavar
- 2009: Whisper with the Wind, Director: Shahram Alidi
- 2009: About Elly, Director: Asghar Farhadi
- 2011: A Separation, Director: Asghar Farhadi
- 2012: Modest Reception, Director: Mani Haghighi
- 2012: Hatred, Director: Reza Dormishian
- 2012: The Orange Suit, Director: Dariush Mehrjui
- 2013: Good to Be Back, Director: Dariush Mehrjui
- 2013: Hush! Girls Don't Scream, Director: Pouran Derakhshandeh
- 2016: A Dragon Arrives!, Director: Mani Haghighi
- 2016: Lantouri, Director: Reza Dormishian
- 2016: I'm Not Angry!, Director: Reza Dormishian
- 2016: The Salesman, Director: Asghar Farhadi
- 2017: Under the Smoky Roof, Director: Pouran Derakhshandeh
- 2017: Simulation, Director: Abed Abest
- 2018: Everybody Knows, Director: Asghar Farhadi
- 2019: A Man without a Shadow, Director: Alireza Raeesian
- 2021: A Hero, Director: Asghar Farhadi
- 2021: Brother's Keeper, Director: Ferit Karahan
- 2021: Naboodan (Absence), Director: Ali Mosaffa
- 2022: Holy Spider, Director: Ali Abbasi
- 2023: Bread and Roses, Director: Sahra Mani
- 2024: Shakkar, Director: Nasim Kiani
- 2024: In the Land of Brothers, Director: Raha Amirfazli, Alireza Ghasemi
- 2025: The Bitter Tears of Zahra Zand, Director: Vahid Hakimzadeh
- 2025: An Eye for an Eye, Director: Tanaz Eshaghian, Farzad Jafari

== Awards ==
- 1998: Crystal Simorgh for Best Editing at the Fajr Film Festival for The Glass Agency
- 1999: Crystal Simorgh for Best Editing at the Fajr Film Festival for The Red Ribbon
- 2006: Crystal Simorgh for Best Editing at the Fajr Film Festival for Fireworks Wednesday
- 2012: Crystal Simorgh for Best Editing at the Fajr Film Festival for The Orange Suit
- 2012: Asian Film Award, Best Editing for Nader and Simin
- 2014: Jury Prize for Best Editing from Iran's Film Critics and Writers Association for I'm Not Angry!
- 2014: Jury Prize for Best Editing from Iran's Film Critics and Writers Association for Hatred
- 2016: Jury Prize for Best Editing from Iran's Film Critics and Writers Association for A Dragon Arrives!
- 2019: Hafez Award for Best Editing in the Feature Film category for I'm Not Angry!
- 2021: Hafez Award for Best Editing in the Feature Film category for A Hero
- 2021: Best Editing International Competition of the Ankara Film Festival for Brother's Keeper, with Ferit Karahan and Sercan Sezgin
- 2021: Best Editing, Antalya Golden Orange Film Festival for Brother's Keeper, together with Ferit Karahan and Sercan Sezgin
- 2022: Jury Prize at the St Andrews Film Festival for Naboodan
- 2023: Best Editing, Danish Film Awards for Holy Spider, with Olivia Neergaard-Holm
- 2025: Best Editing of a Documentary Film, Tribeca Film Festival for An Eye for an Eye, with Soren B. Ebbe
