= Mehrdad Mirkiani =

- Born: Tehran, Iran
- Occupation: Make-up artist
- Years active: 1998–present
- Known for: The Salesman; A Separation; Lantouri

Mehrdad Mirkiani Persian: مهرداد میرکیانی (born 1963 in Tehran) is an Iranian makeup artist and makeup designer.

== Filmography ==
- Exodus (2020)
- Tale of the Sea (makeup artist) 2018
- Pig (2018 film) (makeup designer) 2018
- Bomb (makeup designer) 2018
- Jashne Deltangi (makeup designer) 2018
- Flaming (makeup designer) 2018
- The Misunderstanding (makeup designer) 2018
- Isolation (makeup designer) 2017
- I Motherhood (makeup designer) 2017
- Abba Jaan (makeup artist) 2017
- A Special Day (makeup artist) 2017
- Majan (makeup designer) 2017
- Sara and Ayda (makeup artist) 2017
- The Salesman (2016 film) (makeup artist) 2016
- 50 Kilos of Sour Cherries (makeup designer) 2016
- Born in 1987 (makeup artist) 2016
- A Dragon Arrives! (makeup artist) 2016
- A House on 41st Street (makeup artist) 2016
- Blind Side (makeup artist) 2016
- Breath (makeup artist) 2016
- Lantouri (makeup artist) 2016
- Where Are My Shoes? (makeup artist) 2016
- There Will Be Blood on Wednesday (makeup artist) 2015
- Three Fish (TV Movie) (makeup artist) 2015
- Death of the Fish (makeup artist) 2015
- Avalanche (makeup artist) 2015
- Confessions of My Dangerous Mind (makeup artist) 2015
- /II The Buffalo (makeup designer) 2015
- I Want to Dance (makeup artist) 2014
- We Have a Guest (makeup artist) 2014
- Withdrawal (Urgent Elimination) (Short) (makeup artist) 2014
- Nabat (makeup department head) 2014
- Che (2014 film) (makeup designer) 2014
- Angels Come Together (makeup artist) 2014
- I'm Not Angry! (makeup artist) 2014
- Snow (makeup artist) 2014
- Tales (film) (makeup designer) 2014
- I Cherish My Home 2014 (Short) (makeup artist) (completed)
- Barg Rizan (makeup artist) 2013
- A Cradle for the Mother (makeup designer) 2013
- The Painting Pool (makeup artist) 2013
- I Am a Mother (makeup designer) 2012
- Laboratory (makeup designer) 2012
- Someone Wants to Talk with You (makeup artist) 2012
- Hatred (makeup supervisor) 2012
- Kissing the Moon-Like Face (makeup artist) 2012
- Modest Reception (makeup artist) 2012
- Kolah Ghermezi and Bache Naneh (makeup artist) 2012
- Mixed Pizza (makeup artist) 2011
- A Separation (makeup artist) 2011
- Felicity Land (makeup artist) 2011
- Gold and Copper (makeup artist) 2011
- Leila's Dream (makeup designer) 2010
- Son of Adam Daughter of Eve (makeup artist) 2010
- About Elly (makeup artist) 2009
- Heiran (makeup designer) 2009
- A Span of Heaven (makeup artist) 2008
- Khake ashena (makeup designer) 2008
- The Magical Generation (makeup designer) 2007
- Ghaedeye bazi (makeup designer) 2007
- The Reward of Silence (makeup designer) 2007
- Being a star (makeup designer) 2006
- Setareh Mishavad (makeup designer) 2006
- Mainline (makeup designer) 2006
- Half Moon (makeup artist) 2006
- Fireworks Wednesday (makeup designer) 2006
- In the Name of the Father (makeup designer) 2006
- Friday Evening (makeup artist) 2006
- Girl's Dormitory (makeup designer) 2005
- A Little Kiss (makeup designer) 2005
- Spaghetti in 8 minutes (makeup designer) 2005
- Gilane (makeup designer) 2005
- Ghadamgah (makeup designer) 2004
- The Beautiful City (makeup designer) 2004
- Jayi baraye zendegi (makeup designer) 2003
- Dancing in the Dust (2003 film) (makeup designer) 2003
- Pink (makeup designer) 2003
- Kolah Ghermezi and Sarvenaz (makeup designer) 2002
- The Pastry Girl (makeup designer) 2002
- Low Heights (makeup artist) 2002
- Kolah ghermezi and Sarvenaz (makeup artist) 2002
- Dead Wave (makeup designer) 2001
- The Mummy 3 (makeup designer) 2000
- The Red Ribbon (makeup artist) 1999
- The Legend of the Golden Hoopoe (makeup designer) 1998
- The Glass Agency (makeup artist) 1998
