= I'm Not Angry! =

- Film poster
- Directed by: Reza Dormishian
- Written by: Reza Dormishian
- Produced by: Reza Dormishian
- Starring: Navid Mohammadzadeh; Amir Salehian; Baran Kosari
- Cinematography: Ali Azhari
- Edited by: Hayedeh Safiyari
- Music by: Reza Koulqani
- Distributed by: Iranian Independents
- Release date: 8 February 2014 (Berlin)
- Running time: 110 minutes
- Country: Iran
- Language: Persian
- Budget: $400,000

I'm Not Angry! (Persian: عصبانی نیستم!, translit. Asabani Nistam!) is a 2014 Iranian drama film written and directed by Reza Dormishian, starring Navid Mohamadzadeh and Baran Kosari. The film was screened in the Panorama section of the 64th Berlin International Film Festival.

The film depicts the bitter story of Navid, an Iranian Kurd university student, who has become "starred". (Note: A term used in Iran for the university students who have been expelled from university because of their political beliefs or activities, hence the insertion of an asterisk in front of their names.) Navid tries hard not to lose his love, Setareh. (Note: The Persian word for star.) They met 4 years ago during the unrest in Tehran after the disputed election in 2009, and now Setareh's father asks Navid to clarify his relation with her. We accompany Navid in his efforts to provide the minimum requirements of living, and we take a glance at the various layers of the social classes in Iran.

I’m not angry! is an independent product in the Iranian cinema. That is, the film has not received any financial help from any institute, organisation, centre, institution, state-run or non-governmental network or foundation. The shooting of I’m not angry! was done in more than 60 locations from the northernmost to the southernmost areas in Tehran. A 2013 production, I’m Not Angry!, was a controversial film in 32nd Fajr International Film Festival in 2014 and the only Iranian film in 64th Berlin International Film Festival in 2014. It is Reza Dormishian's second feature film after the feature Hatred. Shot completely in Tehran, I’m Not Angry! explicitly criticises today's conditions in Iran, and as it is written at the beginning of the film, it is ‘A Free Adaptation of Today Iran’.

Berlin International Film Festival in its festival's website announced on 18 January that I’m Not Angry! would be screened in the 64th Berlinale, held 6–16 February 2014 in Germany, as the sole representative of the Iranian cinema. The film had an enthusiastic reception from the critics and audience, and after each screening, Reza Dormishian and the two leading actors Navid Mohammadzadeh and Baran Kosari attended the press conferences among lengthy applauses.

== Synopsis ==
I’m Not Angry! is the story of Navid, a "starred" (student expelled for political reasons) university student who—while trying to provide the minimum requirements of a normal life—tries not to get angry when he is faced with the immoralities prevalent in his society, and he does all he can not to lose his love, Setareh.

== Cast ==
- Navid Mohammadzadeh as Navid
- Amir Salehian as Navid
- Baran Kosari as Setareh
- Reza Behboodi as Mr. Javadi
- Milad Rahimi as Ahmad
- Amir Reza Amiraqa as Mohsen
- Misaq Zaré as Mr. Bagheri
- Reza Koulqani as Reza
- Hojjat Hassanpour as Amir
- Mohamad Kart as Sasan
- Tinou Salehi as Hamid
- Bahram Afshari as Real Estate Agent

== Production ==
- Director of Photography: Ali Azhari
- Sound recording: Nezamoddin Kiaie
- Sound mixing: Mohammad Reza Delpak
- Sound editing: Reza Narimizadeh
- Make-up artist: Mehrdad Mirkiani
- Costume design: Baran Kousari
- Product management: Mehdi Badrloo
- Visual effects: Amir Saharkhiz, Kamran Saharkhiz
- Assistant director: Pedram Alizadeh
- Photography: Mohamad Badrloo
- Released by: Filmiran

== Awards ==
- 17th Shanghai International Film Festival, Best Film Award, 2014
- 17th Shanghai International Film Festival, Best Director Award, for Reza Dormishian, 2014
- 17th Shanghai International Film Festival, Vincent Ward Prize sponsored by the University of Canterbury, for 'Best Film and Best Director for the Asian New Talent Prize', for Reza Dormishian, New Zealand, 2015
- 8th Celebration of Iran's Film Critics and Writers Association, Best Actor Award, for Navid Mohamadzadeh, 2014
- 8th Celebration of Iran's Film Critics and Writers Association, Best Edit Award, for Haydeh Safiyari, 2014
- 8th Celebration of Iran's Film Critics and Writers Association, Honorary Diploma Award for Best Director 'Reza Dormishian', 2014
- 15th Asiatica Film Mediale of Roma, Special Mention, Best Asian Feature Film Award, 2014
- Asia Pacific Screen Awards, APSA Academy NETPAC Development Prize, for Reza Dormishian, 2014
- 5th London Iranian Film Festival, Best Narrative Feature Award, for Reza Dormishian, 2014
- 4th Iranian Film Festival Australia (IFFA), Audience choice Award, 2014
- 4th Iranian film festival Czech Republic (IFF), Audience Award, 2015

== Nominations ==
- 8th Annual Asia Pacific Screen Awards (APSA), nominated for 2 awards, 2014
- 8th Celebration of Iran's Film Critics and Writers Association, nominated for 7 awards, 2014
- 32nd Fajr International film festival, nominated for Best Man Actor Award, for Navid Mohamadzadeh, 2014
- 32nd Fajr International film festival, nominated for Best Woman Actor Award, for Baran Kousari, 2014
- 32nd Fajr International film festival, ‌nominated for best Edith, for Hayedeh Safiyari, 2014
- 32nd Fajr International film festival, ‌nominated for best sound recording, for Nezamoddin Kiaie, 2014
- 32nd Fajr International film festival, ‌nominated for best sound mixing, for Mohammad Reza Delpak, 2014
- 32nd Fajr International film festival, ‌nominated for best Visual effects, for Amir Saharkhiz and Kamran Saharkhiz, 2014
