= Tanaz Eshaghian =

Iranian-American documentary filmmaker

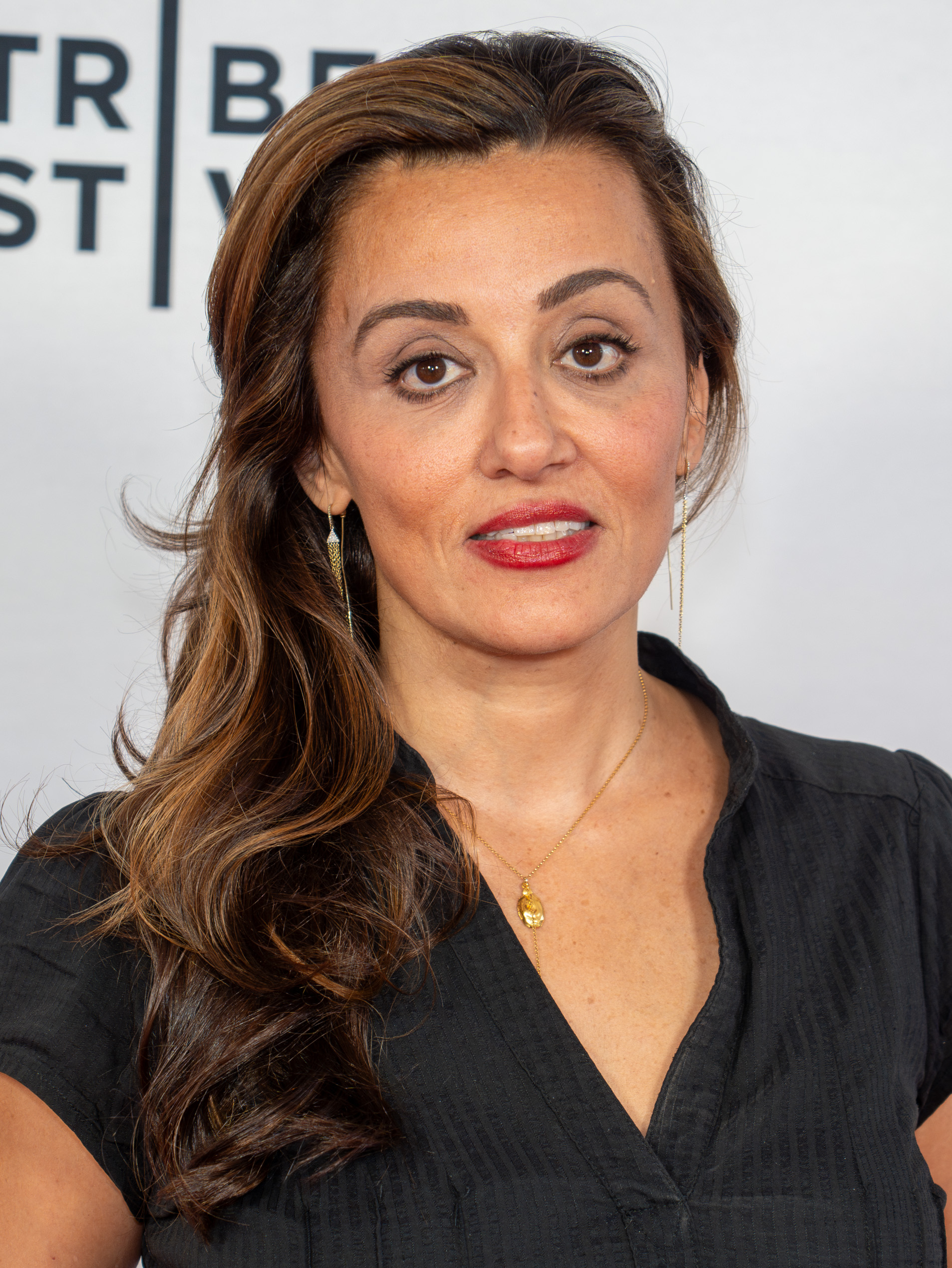
- Eshaghian at the 2025 Tribeca Festival
- Born: Iran
- Education: Brown University, The New School
- Occupation: Documentary filmmaker
- Known for: Be Like Others, Love Crimes of Kabul

Tanaz Eshaghian (Persian: طناز اسحاقیان; born 8 September) is an Iranian-born American documentary filmmaker. She resides in New York City.

== Early life and education ==
Tanaz left Iran with her mother at the age of 6, during the period after the 1979 Iranian Revolution. She is both Iranian and Jewish.

Eshaghian grew up in New York City, and went to Trinity School. She graduated from Brown University with a BA degree in semiotics. She has an MA degree in media studies from The New School.

== Career ==
For her début feature-length film Be Like Others, a provocative look at transgender women in Iran choosing to undergo sex change surgery, she returned to Iran for the first time in 25 years. Be Like Others, a BBC 2, France 5, ITVS production, premiered at the 2008 Sundance Film Festival and went on to win the Teddy special jury prize at the Berlin Film Festival, Best Documentary at Noor Iranian Film Festival, as well as the ELSE Siegessäule Reader's Choice Award, and was nominated for an Emmy Award. It has been invited to over 30 film festivals worldwide and had its U.S. television premiere on HBO in June 2009. In 2011, she completed Love Crimes of Kabul, a documentary film inside a women's prison in Kabul, Afghanistan, focusing on "moral crimes", for HBO.

Her first film I Call Myself Persian: Iranians in America, completed in 2002, told the story of how Iranians living in the U.S. were affected by prejudice and xenophobia after the September 11 attacks. In Love Iranian-American Style, completed in 2006, she filmed her traditional Iranian family, both in New York and Los Angeles, California, documenting their obsession with marrying her off and her own cultural ambivalence.

Her films have also screened at the Museum of Modern Art, and in the Walter Reade cinema at the Lincoln Center for the Performing Arts in New York City.

In 2025, Eshaghian directed An Eye for an Eye alongside Farzad Jafari, which had its world premiere at the Tribeca Festival, where it received a Special Jury Mention for Documentary Feature.

== Love Iranian-American Style (2006) ==
Eshaghian's Love Iranian-American Style provides a first-person account of the documentarian's struggles with the prospects of dating and marriage, as she hits the age of 25. As an Iranian-Jewish-American who lives with her single mother, Eshagian has traditionally restricted her dating patterns to Caucasian men, but the pivotal birthday arrives and sends her mother into a panic; she thus avows to set Tanaz up in a traditional arranged marriage with an Iranian groom. Tanaz agrees - barely - and thus embarks on a series of dates with prospective candidates for the "big M." Her technique consists of setting the suitors up in one-on-one, on-camera interviews, in which she asks them, point blank, to espouse their feelings about dating and marriage, leading to a series of brutally honest and occasionally hilarious confessions. Eshagian also unearths old boyfriends and films them expostulating on why they broke up with her. On another level, the film sees the director plunging, headfirst, into a cultural abyss as she attempts to define herself via ethnic identity - and finds herself being torn, sharply, between the Iranian ideal of a fixed, long term union and the distinctly American tendencies to play the field and test the waters before committing.

The Iranian Jewish tradition views marriage much more as a group alliance than as an individual affair like in Western culture. The Iranian family doesn't perceive bounds that create privacy for couples; instead, the family expects to know all about what is happening in a relationship. Tanaz finds this uncomfortable because she distinguishes between her family of orientation, the one that raised her, and her family of procreation, the family she will create through marriage, and she wants that family to be independent following American culture. Tanaz was raised in an extended family household—one that includes several generations of relatives. In American culture, families are neolocal—they establish new homes when they marry. Although Tanaz's family wants her to engage in endogamy at first and remain within their cultural community, Tanaz convinces them she has to marry someone of American culture (exogamy). The traditions of working for one's husband and marrying young are examples of gender roles in Iranian Jewish culture.The disparity between the expectations for women as opposed to for men demonstrates gender stratification—varying respect for the individual based on gender—that supports a male-dominated hierarchy.

== Filmography ==
- 2002: I Call Myself Persian: Iranians in America
- 2003: From Babylon to Beverly Hills: The Exodus of Iran’s Jews
- 2006: Love Iranian-American Style
- 2008: Be Like Others
- 2011: Love Crimes of Kabul
- 2018: The Last Refugees
- 2022: As Far As They Can Run
- 2025: An Eye for an Eye

== Awards ==
- 2002: Best Short Documentary Film of Woodstock Festival, for I Call Myself Persian
- 2008: Teddy Award, for Be Like Others
- 2008: Amnesty International Film Prize, for Be Like Others
- 2008: Reader Jury of the "Siegessäule" at 58th Berlin International Film Festival, for Be Like Others
- 2010: Emmy Award Nomination Long Form Informational Documentary, for Be Like Others
- 2011: Movies That Matter Camera Justicia award, for Love Crimes Of Kabul
- 2017: Palm Springs Short Film Festival best documentary short, for The Last Refugees
- 2022: Woodstock Film Festival best short documentary, for As Far As They Can Run
- 2022: DOC NYC Best short documentary director, for As Far As They Can Run
- 2023: Emmy Nomination Outstanding Short Documentary, for As Far As They Can Run
- 2023: Oscar short list for As Far As They Can Run in the Documentary short category
- 2025: Special Jury Mention for An Eye For An Eye at the Tribeca Film Festival
- 2025: Best Editing for An Eye For An Eye at the Tribeca Film Festival

== See also ==
- List of female film and television directors
- List of LGBT-related films directed by women
- List of Iranian women filmmakers and theatre directors
