= Bahram Afshari =

Iranian actor and director (born 1987)

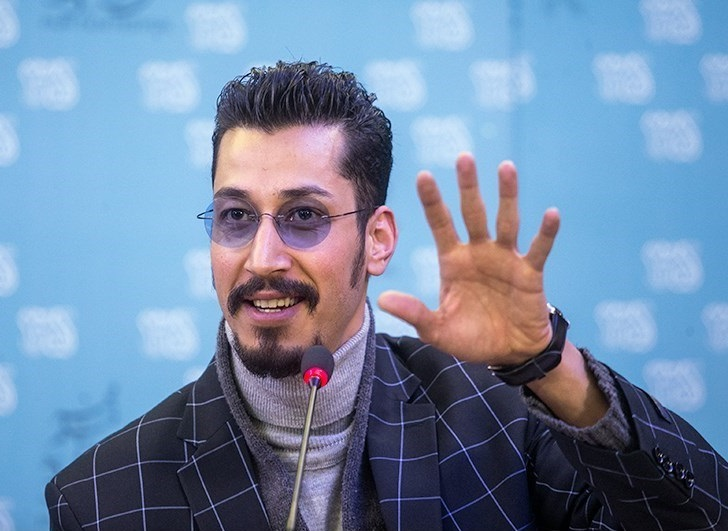
- Afshari at the 2017 Fajr Film Festival
- Born: May 27, 1987 (age 39); Hamadan, Iran
- Education: Azad University (BFA)
- Occupations: Actor; director; playwright
- Years active: 2003–present

Bahram Afshari (Persian: بهرام افشاری; born May 27, 1987) is an Iranian actor and director. He is best known for his role as Behtash Fariba in Capital (2013–present). His directorial debut film, Seventy Thirty (2024) became the highest-grossing film of all time in Iran, and he also starred in Fossil (2023), the second highest-grossing film.

Afshari has received various accolades, including a Crystal Simorgh, two Hafez Awards, in addition to nominations for two Iran Cinema Celebration Awards and an Iran's Film Critics and Writers Association Award.

== Early life ==
Bahram Afshari was born on 27 May 1987 in Hamedan, Iran. His parents separated during his childhood, and he has spoken about this experience, stating:

My mother left me and my father when I I was two years old. My father later fell ill, and I spent much of my childhood in hospitals, caring for him.

—

From a young age, Afshari was passionate about acting and performed in theater productions in Hamedan. At the age of 22, he moved to Tehran to pursue his career, studying acting professionally under Hamid Samandarian. He subsequently began working in theater. Afshari graduated with a degree in manufacturing and production from a vocational school and later earned a bachelor's degree in acting from Islamic Azad University, Tehran.

== Filmography ==
=== Film ===
Year	Title	Role	Director	Notes	Ref(s)
2013	Tah Asphalt		Reza Asghari	Short film; unreleased	
2014	I'm Not Angry!	Real Estate Agent	Reza Dormishian		
2014	Mom's Birthday		Morteza Shams	Short film	
2015	Iran Burger	Panjshanbeh	Masoud Jafari Jozani		
2016	Lantouri	Bahram	Reza Dormishian		
2017	Simple Worker Needed	Ghadam	Manouchehr Hadi		
2018	Rahman 1400	Anoush	Manouchehr Hadi		
2019	Newcastle	Ebi	Mohsen Ghasabian		
2019	Unsophisticated	Saeed Gholami	Farzad Motamen		
2020	Mr. Censor	Shahram Far'i	Ali Jabbarzadeh		
2020	After the Incident		Pouria Heidary Oureh		
2021	Staging	Asad	Alireza Samadi		
2022	Sag Band	Farzad	Mehran Ahmadi		
2023	Fossil	Esi Amouee	Karim Amini		
2023	Gray House		Bahram Afshari	Short film; also as writer	
2024	The Year of the Cat	Jahangir	Mostafa Taghizadeh		
2024	Seventy Thirty	Barat Amini	Bahram Afshari	Directorial feature film debut	
2025	Man with Glasses	Halim Rayegan	Karim Amini		
2026	The Death Bath		Kazem Daneshi		

=== Web ===
Year	Title	Role	Director	Platform	Notes	Ref(s)
2019–2020	The Heart	Farab Sohrabpour	Manouchehr Hadi	Filimo	Supporting role	
2020	Mutual Friendship	Himself	Shahab Hosseini	Namava	Talk show; 1 episode	
2021	Red Square	Payam Makin	Ebrahim Ebrahimian	Filimo	Main role; 9 episodes	
2022	The Secret of Survival	Rahim Timsar	Saeed Aghakhani	Filmnet	Main role; 17 episodes	
2022	Party	Himself	Iraj Tahmasb	Namava	Guest appearance; 1 episode	

=== Television ===
Year	Title	Role	Director	Network	Notes	Ref(s)
2013–present	Capital	Shirafkan Fariba / Behtash Fariba	Sirous Moghaddam	IRIB TV1	Main role; 35 episodes	
2017	AlalBadal	Hormoz	Sirous Moghaddam	IRIB TV1	Main role; 14 episodes	
2019	Special Condition	Manouchehr Shane'Besar	Vahid Amirkhani	IRIB TV3	Main role; 18 episodes	

== Theatre ==
Year	Title	Playwright	Director	Stage	Notes	Ref(s)
2015, 2018	Hedgehog	Bahram Afshari	Bahram Afshari	Iranian Artists Forum, Baran Theatre, Iranshahr Theater	Also as actor	
2022, 2024, 2025	Who Killed the Hedgehog?	Bahram Afshari	Bahram Afshari	Shahrzad Theater Complex, Yazd Central Hall	Also as actor	
2024–2025	300	Mohammad Rahmanian	Sohrab Pournazeri	Sa'dabad Complex	As actor	

== Awards and nominations ==
Name of the award ceremony, year presented, category, nominee of the award, and the result of the nomination
Award	Year	Category	Nominated work	Result	Ref(s)
Fajr Film Festival	2026	Best Actor in a Leading Role	The Death Bath	Won	
Fajr International Theater Festival	2013	Best Actor – Regions, New Experiences, New Look	Robinson Crusoe	Won	
Hafez Awards	2017	Best Actor – Television Series Comedy	AlalBadal	Nominated	
Hafez Awards	2018	Best Actor – Television Series Comedy	Capital	Won	
Hafez Awards	2020	Best Actor – Television Series Comedy	Capital	Nominated	
Hafez Awards	2023	Best Actor – Television Series Comedy	The Secret of Survival	Nominated	
Hafez Awards	2023	Best Actor – Motion Picture	Fossil	Won	
Iran Cinema Celebration	2017	Best Actor in a Supporting Role	Lantouri	Nominated	
Iran Cinema Celebration	2018	Best Actor in a Supporting Role	Simple Worker Needed	Nominated	
Iran's Film Critics and Writers Association	2017	Best Actor in a Supporting Role	Simple Worker Needed	Nominated	
Urban International Film Festival	2017	Best Actor	Simple Worker Needed	Nominated	
