= President Mir Qanbar =

- Directed by: Mohammad Shirvani
- Written by: Mohammad Shirvani
- Starring: Mir Qanbar
- Release date: 2005
- Running time: 70 minutes
- Country: Iran
- Language: Persian

President Mir Qanbar is a 2005 Iranian documentary film directed by Mohammad Shirvani. The film follows Mir Qanbar, an elderly Iranian man, as he campaigns in the country's presidential election.

The film won the Award of Excellence at the Yamagata International Documentary Film Festival in 2005 and in 2007 won the Audience Favorite award at the Noor Iranian Film Festival in Los Angeles.

== See also ==
- Fat Shaker
