= Hadi Ahmadi =

Iranian actor and writer

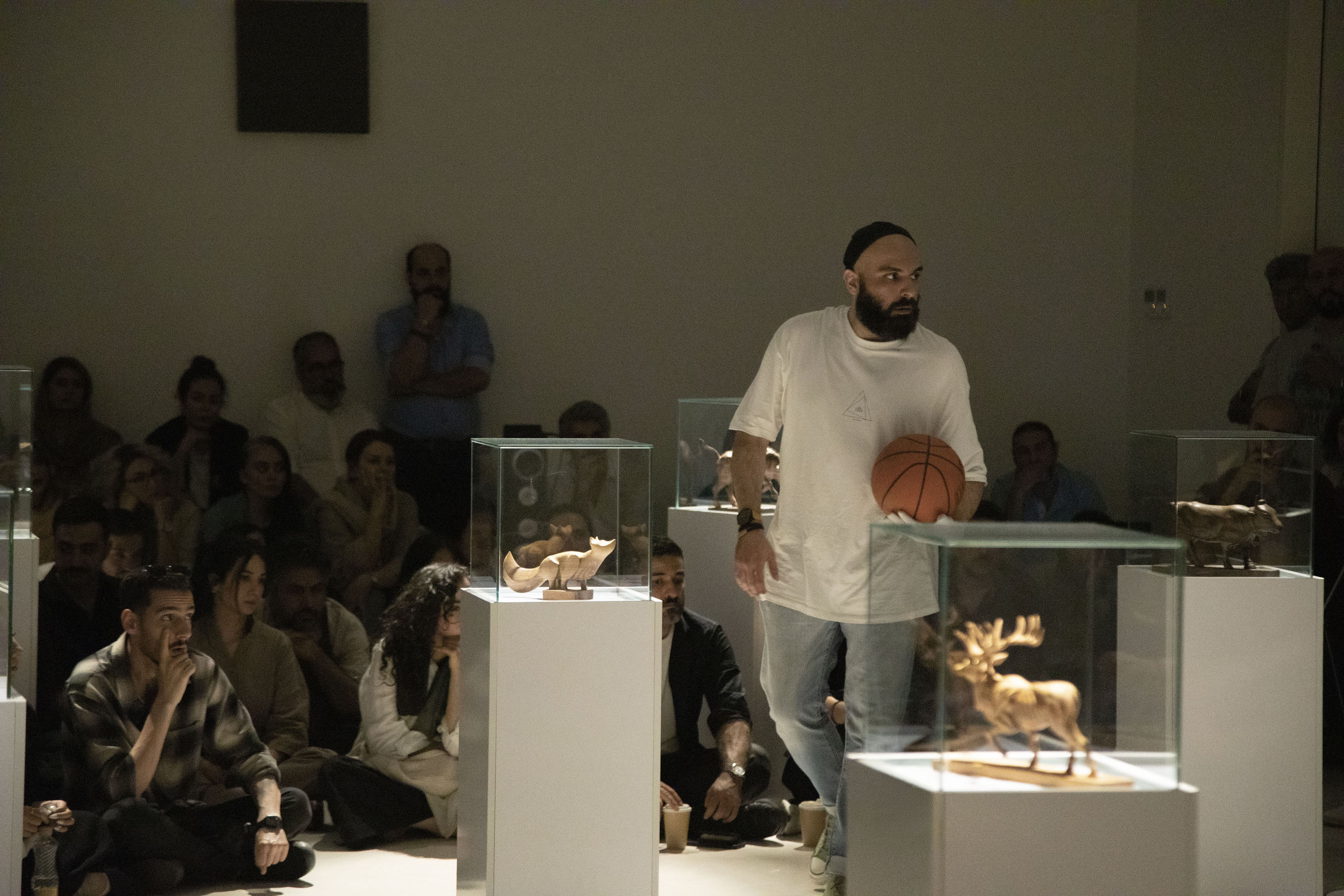
- Hadi Ahmadi in his self-portrait theater
- Born: 31 July 1987 (age 37); Tehran, Iran
- Style: Theater / Cinema

Hadi Ahmadi (born July 31, 1987) is an Iranian actor, writer, and theater director.

== Activities ==
Hadi Ahmadi studied acting under Hamid Samandarian in 2011 and completed a comprehensive writing course under figures such as Mohammad Yaghoubi. Ahmadi is active in various fields, including writing, acting, and directing. He wrote short films such as Unframed. Additionally, he acted in works such as Wooden Crow. His performance in the play Wooden Crow garnered attention from Armenian audiences at the HighFest Theatre Festival in Armenia.

In 2017, he earned the Best Actor award at the 6th Shahr Theater Festival for acting, directing, and writing the play False Singing at Fakhrabad Crossroad. He also won the Best Actor award at the 5th Omid Theater Festival for his performance in The Story of Mr. Peter Semyonovich.

In cinema, Ahmadi has acted in films such as Lantouri and Imaginary ("Tassavor"), with the latter being screened at the Cannes Film Festival in 2022.

=== Works ===
No.	Title	Year	Director	Role	Venue	Source
1	Lost and Found	2017	Amir Mohandesian	Writer	IranShahr Theatre Hall	
2	Singing Off-Key at Fakhrabad Crossroad	2018 and 2019	Director of the play	Director, actor, writer	Entezami Theater Hall and Hafez Hall	
3	Notes in Print	2015	Director of the play	Director and actor	Baran Theater	
4	Self-Portrait	2024	Morteza Mirmontazemi	Writer and actor	West Platform	
5	Framed (Short Film)	2020	Morteza Mirmontazemi	Writer, actor	Cinema	
6	Paivazik	2020	Hojjat Gholami	Actor	Cinema	
7	Declaration	2020	Moein Zarabi	Actor	Cinema	
8	Massage Room	2021	Sahra Asadollahi	Actor	Cinema	
9	Lily Is the Name of All Iranian Girls	2016	Amir Mohandesian	Actor	Baran Theater	
10	The Tenant	2015	Taymaz Rezvani	Actor	Baran Theater	
11	"Twenty-Five" (Day of Lies episode)	2014	Mohammad Yaghoubi	Actor	Niavaran Cultural Center	
12	August: Osage County	2014	Mohammad Yaghoubi	Actor	Baran Theater	
13	Red and Others	2014	Naziar Omrani	Actor	Gholhak Cinema Complex	
14	Skin, Bone, Iron	2013	Taymaz Rezvani	Actor	Parin Theater	
15	After the Impact of a Hard Object on the Head	2021	Sajjad Dagestani	Actor	Entezami Theater Hall	
16	Lantouri	2015	Reza Dormishian	Actor	Cinema	
17	Imagine	2020	Ali Behrad	Actor	Cinema	
