= Hossein Pakdel =

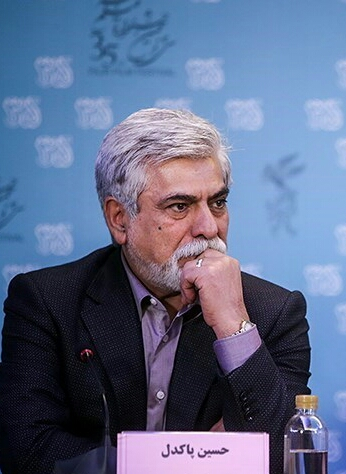
- Hossein Pakdel in February 2017
- Occupations: actor; theatre director; producer; playwright; television presenter
- Spouse: Atefeh Razavi
- Relatives: Masoud (brother); Mahdi (brother)

Hossein Pakdel (Persian: حسین پاکدل) is an Iranian actor, theatre director, producer, playwright, and television presenter. His filmography includes performances in notable works such as Mannequin (2019), The Snow on the Pines (2012), Lantouri (2016), Astigmatism (2018), Night Shift (2015), Watching This Movie Is a Crime (2019), and Seventy Thirty (2024).

In 2011, at the 29th Fajr International Theater Festival, Hossein Pakdel received the award for Best Director from the jury of the International Association of Theatre Critics (IATC) for his direction of the play "His Excellency".

== Personal life ==
Hossein Pakdel is a member of a family engaged in the performing arts, which includes his spouse, Atefeh Razavi, and his two brothers, Masoud and Mahdi.

== Defamation Allegations ==
On 6 June 2024, Tehran's Prosecutor announced the opening of a judicial case against a television presenter and actor for "publishing content aimed at disrupting public peace" and "insult and defamation." Subsequently, Tasnim and Fars news agencies identified the individual as Hossein Pakdel. Tasnim reported that "Hossein Pakdel, on his Instagram account, targeted Ebrahim Raisi and Qasem Soleimani with mockery and satire." Fars stated that "Hossein Pakdel had published an insulting story against martyrs the previous day." Pakdel, without explicitly naming Raisi or Soleimani, had written on his Instagram account: "The kitchen of politics turns seasoned men into rubber steaks, and inept men into regime-special cutlets." The term "cutlet" entered public discourse following the death of Islamic Revolutionary Guard Corps (IRGC) commander Qasem Soleimani in a 2020 U.S. drone strike, which resulted in the dismemberment of his body. The ambiguous nature of Pakdel's statement underscored the authorities' limited tolerance for any perceived criticism directed towards Iranian leaders and national figures, even when such critique is expressed indirectly.

== Filmography ==
=== Web ===
Year	Title	Role	Director	Platform	Notes	Ref(s)
2025	Beretta		Amir Hossein Torabi	FILMNET		
