= Love Crimes of Kabul =

- Directed by: Tanaz Eshaghian
- Written by: Sara Bernstein
- Produced by: Tanaz Eshaghian; Christoph Jorg
- Starring: Kareema; Firuz; Aleema; Zia Jaan; Sabereh
- Cinematography: Kat Patterson
- Edited by: Jay Freund
- Music by: Florencia Di Concilio
- Production company: HBO Documentary Films
- Distributed by: HBO
- Release date: July 11, 2011
- Running time: 72 minutes
- Languages: Dari; Pashto; English in subtitles

Love Crimes of Kabul is a 2011 documentary film following select cases of inmates at Badam Bagh women's prison in Kabul, Afghanistan, where half are jailed for "moral crimes" such as adultery, premarital sex and running away from home. "If they were good women, they wouldn't be here," says a prison guard at the beginning of the film.

== Cases ==
- Kareema, 20 and pregnant, has been in prison for two months awaiting trial for the crime of pre-marital sex with fiancé Firuz. She faces up to 15 years in prison.
- Aleema, 23, ran away from her violent family and sought refuge with Zia Jaan, another woman. They have been in prison three months. Aleema accuses Zia of trying to prostitute her, which Zia denies. Aleema is facing up to 15 years for running away; Zia Jaan up to 20 years for housing her and attempting to sell her.
- Sabereh, 18, is accused of having anal sex with a neighbor. She was turned in by her father. Medical exam showed she is still a virgin.

== Reception ==
According to critic aggregation site Rotten Tomatoes, the film has a critic score of 58%, with reviews calling it; "eye-opening", "fascinating" and "shocking".

== See also ==
- No Burqas Behind Bars, a 2013 documentary about life in the Takhar Prison women's prison in Afghanistan
