= Mannequin (TV series) =

- Persian: مانکن
- Genre: Romance, drama
- Written by: Babak Kaydan
- Directed by: Hossein Soheilizadeh
- Starring: Amir Hossein Arman; Nazanin Bayati; Mohammad Reza Foroutan; Merila Zarei; Farzad Farzin; Linda Kiani; Hossein Pakdel; Elham Pavehnejad; Shabnam Qolikhani; Nafiseh Roshan; Homayoun Ershadi; Reza Tavakoli
- Theme music composer: Masoud Sekhavatdoust
- Opening theme: Farzad Farzin
- Composer: Masoud Sekhavatdoust
- Country of origin: Iran
- Original language: Persian
- No. of seasons: 1
- No. of episodes: 26

Production
- Producer: Iraj Mohammadi
- Production location: Tehran
- Cinematography: Reza Sheibani
- Editor: Amin Abedi
- Running time: 50–55 minutes

Original release
- Network: Filimo
- Release: 24 August 2019 – 17 February 2020

Mannequin (Persian: مانکن, romanized: Mankan) is a 2019–2020 Iranian romance, drama TV series directed by Hossein Soheilizadeh.

== Storyline ==
"Mannequin" deals with the economic inequality of different classes of society and the comparison of able-bodied people with the low-income class of society. Kaveh (Amir Hossein Arman) and Hamta (Nazanin Bayati) have started a romantic relationship, but social and economic problems cause them to face challenges along the way.

== Cast ==
- Amir Hossein Arman as Kaveh
- Nazanin Bayati as Hamta
- Mohammad Reza Foroutan as Akhgar
- Merila Zarei as Katayoun
- Farzad Farzin as Bahram
- Linda Kiani as Jila
- Hossein Pakdel as Salman
- Elham Pavehnejad as Farkhondeh
- Shabnam Qolikhani as Afsoon
- Nafiseh Roshan as Maryam
- Homayoun Ershadi as Jamshid
- Reza Tavakoli as Dariush
- Rabeh Madani as Parvin
- Behshad Sharifian as Behnam
- Mohammad Sadeghi as Abtin
- Behzad Khalaj as Khalaj
- Maedeh Mohammadi as Parimah
- Arefeh Memarian as Bahar
- Siavash Kheirabi
