= An Eye for an Eye (2025 film) =

2025 documentary film

- Official poster
- Directed by: Tanaz Eshaghian; Farzad Jafari
- Produced by: Christoph Jörg; Katayoun Arsanjani; Joey Marra
- Cinematography: Gelareh Kiazand; Ali Jalali
- Edited by: Soren B. Ebbe; Hayedeh Safiyari
- Music by: Kristian Eidnes Andersen
- Production companies: Unchained Productions; Closer Media; Elkfilm; SeeTǒ Productions
- Distributed by: Jolt
- Release dates: June 5, 2025 (Tribeca); August 12, 2026 (United States)
- Running time: 84 minutes
- Countries: United States; Denmark; Iran
- Language: Farsi

An Eye for an Eye is a 2025 internationally co-produced documentary film, directed by Tanaz Eshaghian and Farzad Jafari. It follows Tahereh, who has been convicted of murdering her husband. After serving her sentence, she faces negotiation with her in-laws, who have the legal right to execute or forgive her.

It had its world premiere at the Tribeca Festival on June 5, 2025, where it received Special Jury Mention for Documentary Feature and Best Editing in a Documentary Feature. It was released in the United States on August 12, 2026, by Jolt.

== Premise ==
Tahereh has been convicted of murdering her husband. After serving her sentence, she faces negotiation with her in-laws, who have the legal right to execute or forgive her.

== Production ==
Tanaz Eshaghian was looking for her next project when she was told the story of Tahereh, deciding to make a documentary about her.

== Release ==
It had its world premiere at the Tribeca Festival on June 5, 2025, where it received Special Jury Mention for Documentary Feature and Best Editing in a Documentary Feature. In July 2026, Jolt acquired distribution rights to the film, and set it for a August 12, 2026, release.

== Reception ==
On Rotten Tomatoes, 100% of 10 critic reviews are positive, with an average rating of 8.60/10.

Louisa Moore of Screen Zealots praised the film writing: "Tells a difficult story with honesty and compassion, trusting viewers to grapple with its painful contradictions, impossible choices, and the unforgettable human impact." Ben Sears of Loud and Clear Reviews wrote: "A fascinating, complex morality tale where the viewer can’t help but see both sides in a life-or-death debate, and one of the best documentaries of the year."
