= Donkey in Lahore =

- Directed by: Faramarz K. Rahber
- Production company: Faraway Productions
- Release date: 28 April 2008 (USA)
- Running time: 117 minutes

Donkey In Lahore is a 2008 documentary by Faramarz Rahber about the life of an Australian who falls in love with a Pakistani woman and decides to marry her. In North America, it premiered in the east coast at the Tribeca film festival and in the west coast at the Dawn Breakers International Film Festival, later winning the Audience Favorite award, Best Documentary and Best Director at the 2009 Noor Iranian Film Festival.
