= Deep Breath (2003 film) =

2003 film

- Directed by: Parviz Shahbazi
- Written by: Parviz Shahbazi
- Produced by: Amir Samavati
- Starring: Mansour Shahbazi; Maryam Palizban; Saeed Amini
- Cinematography: Ali Loghmani
- Edited by: Parviz Shahbazi
- Music by: Mehrdad Palizban
- Distributed by: Beh Negar
- Release date: 2003
- Running time: 86 minutes
- Country: Iran
- Language: Persian

Deep Breath (Persian: نفس عمیق) is a 2003 Iranian film directed by Parviz Shahbazi. The film won the Crystal Simorgh for Best Screenplay at the 2003 Fajr International Film Festival and the FIPRESCI Prize at the 2003 Pusan International Film Festival. The film was also Iran's official submission for the Best Foreign Language Film Academy Award in 2004.
