= Nahid Moslemi =

Iranian actress

- ناهید مسلمی
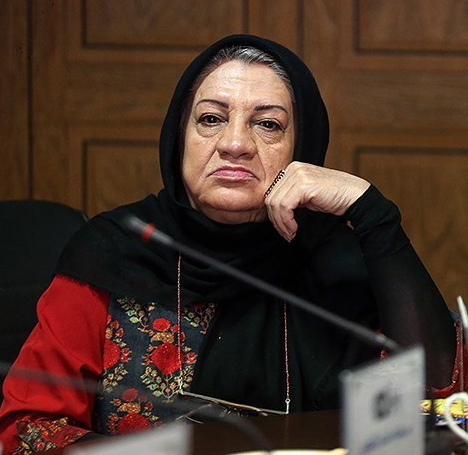
- Moslemi in 2019
- Born: December 16, 1955 (age 70); Tehran, Iran
- Occupation: Actress
- Years active: 1976–present
- Spouse: Abbas Khaligh (m. 1997)
- Children: Sheida Khaligh

Nahid Moslemi (Persian: ناهید مسلمی; born December 16, 1955) is an Iranian actress. She gained prominence in 2010 through her role in the television series Chardivari.

== Early life and career ==
Moslemi was born in Tehran. She began her acting career in 1978 with her debut role in the play Dictation and Angle by Gholamhossein Saedi, directed by Bahram Dehghan.

Moslemi trained under Roknoddin Khosravi and, in 1983, joined the Anahita Institute under Mostafa Oskooyi's direction. Alongside her theater training, she worked as a translator for the Red Crescent for several years. She began her professional stage career with the Anahita Oskooyi group, performing alongside Behzad Farahani. Moslemi holds a degree in English literature and comparative cultural history. Her performances have earned her accolades at numerous festivals.

Moslemi is the mother of Shida Khaligh, a fellow Iranian actress. In 2006, she received the Best Actress award from the Actors’ Association of the House of Theater for her role in Mohammad Yaghoubi’s play The Moon in the Water. Her performance in the home theater production Shahrzad further solidified her reputation.

In February 2014, Moslemi was honored with the festival statuette at the 32nd Fajr Theater Festival for her outstanding contributions to theater.

== Filmography ==
=== Theatr ===
Year	Title	Director	Notes
1986	Maryam va Mardavij	Behzad Farahani	Performed at Tehran City Theater, Main Hall
1988	Medea	Qotbeddin Sadeghi	Performed at Tehran City Theater, Chaharsou Hall
1990	Ah Khaharam Medea	Masoud Samiei	Performed at Tehran City Theater, Qashqai Hall
1990	Simorgh	Qotbeddin Sadeghi	Performed at Tehran City Theater, Main Hall
2008–2017	Kukuye Kabutaran-e Haram	Alireza Naderi	Performed at Tehran City Theater, Chaharsou Hall

=== Cinema ===
Year	Title	Director
2000	Zendan-e Zanan	Manijeh Hekmat
2006	Tasvieh Hesab	Tahmineh Milani
2006	Mitaresam, Pas Dorogh Migooyam	Tahmineh Milani
2010	Dooneh Zamin	Kamal Tabrizi
2011	Ye Habbeh Ghand	Reza Mirkarimi
2017	Mogheyman-e Nakoja	Shahab Hosseini
2017	Ghanoun-e Murphy	Rambod Javan
2019	Shenay-e Parvaneh	Mohammad Kart
2019	Sag Band	Mehran Ahmadi
2023	Do Rooz Dir Tar	Asghar Naeimi
2023	Seventy Thirty	Bahram Afshari

=== Television ===
Year	Title	Director	Notes
1991	Forough-e Bipayan	Esmaeil Pourreza	Channel 2
1996	Tasvir-e Yek Roya	Ahmad Amini	Channel 1
1999	Mosafer	Javad Ardakani	Channel 2
2000	In Yek Dadgah Nist	Asghar Tousi	Channel 5
2000	Dokhtaran	Asghar Tousi	Channel 5
2005	Reyhaneh	Sirous Moghadam	Channel 3
2006	Payan-e Namayesh	Bahman Zarrinpour	Channel 1
2007	Halghe-ye Sabz	Ebrahim Hatamikia	Channel 3
2007	Bidari	Bahram Azimpour	Channel 3
2009	Parantez Baz	Kiumars Pourahmad	Channel 1
2009	Chardivari	Sirous Moghadam	Channel 1
2011	Chek Bargashti	Sirous Moghadam	Channel 1
2012	Tehran Pelak 1	Mehdi Mazloumi	Channel 5
2014	Hameh Chiz Anjast	Shahram Shah-Hosseini	Channel 3
2014	Barabar Ba Asl	Seyed Jalaleddin Dori	Channel 1
2018	Heyat Modireh	Maziar Miri	Channel 5
2019	Zoj Ya Fard	Alireza Najafzadeh	Channel 3

=== Web ===
Year	Title	Director	Notes
2015–2018	Shahrzad	Hassan Fathi	Home Video Network
2020–2021	Siavash	Soroush Mohammadzadeh	Home Video Network
2020–2021	Mikham Zende Bemoonam	Shahram Shah-Hosseini	Home Video Network
2022	Yaghi	Mohammad Kart	Home Video Network
2023	Daftar-e Yaddasht	Kiarash Asadizadeh	Home Video Network
2024	Occasion	Seyed Masoud Atyabi	Home Video Network
2024	Dar Entehay-e Shab	Aida Panahandeh	Home Video Network
2024	Joker	Ehsan Alikhani	Reality Show, Home Video Network

== Awards and honors ==
- First Place, Best Actress, Short Film Last Glance, Tabriz, Young Cinema Unity Festival, 1989
- Certificate of Appreciation for Best Actress for the play Bahram Chubineh, directed by Qotboddin Sadeghi, 1994
- First Place, Best Actress in Play Reading for Aunt Iran, 2006
- Top Award, Monologue Festival, 2008
- Certificate of Appreciation, 6th Actors’ Celebration for The Cooing of the Shrine’s Doves, directed by Alireza Naderi, 2009
- Nominated for Best Actress for the play Continuous Past at the 32nd Fajr Theater Festival, 2014
- Special Jury Award, 15th Resistance Theater Festival for the play Jan Gaz, 2015
- Nominated for Best Actress at the 29th Fajr Theater Festival for the play No Gentlemen Allowed
- Certificate of Appreciation, Baran Theater Week, 2016
- Selected in the Professions Category, 13th International Radio Festival for the radio play Someone Take My Father, Radio Namayesh, 2014
