= HighFest International Performing Arts Festival =

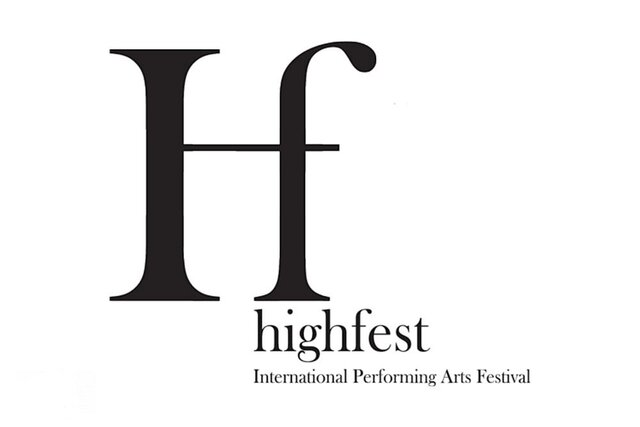
- Location: Yerevan, Armenia
- Founded: 2003
- Hosted by: Armenian Actors Union NGO
- Website: www.highfest.am

The HighFest International Performing Arts Festival (in English: HighFest | in Armenian: Հայֆեստ) was established in 2003. The festival is organized by the non-governmental organization Armenian Actors Union.

== Foundation ==
The HighFest festival began with the goal of bringing artistic companies to Armenia, introducing world art to the country, and showcasing Armenian culture and art to visitors attending the festival. In recent years, the festival has expanded significantly, attracting a broader range of artists. It is considered the most significant festival among the countries of the former USSR outside of Moscow.

== Event dates ==
The HighFest International Performing Arts Festival is held annually from October 1 to October 8 in Yerevan, Armenia.

== Iranian groups ==
Every year, numerous groups from Iran participate in the festival due to the proximity of the two countries and the ease of travel. Notable participants include:

- Titook Theater Group led by Ebrahim Poshtkoohi,
- Dimak Group led by Albert Bigjanyan,
- Mokhtalefat Group led by Arman Shirali Nejad and Arad Entezar.
- Morteza Mirmontazami participated in the festival in 2024 alongside Hadi Ahmadi with the play "The Wooden Crow."

Additionally, Artur Ghukasyan, the festival's founder and director, mentioned in an interview that the priority in selecting participating groups is to invite performers from neighboring countries such as Iran and Georgia, emphasizing the importance of maintaining connections with theaters in neighboring regions.

== Scope ==
In recent years, the festival has expanded to include not only theater but also other forms of performing arts. Since 2006, HighFest has featured performances across various genres, including drama, comedy, mime, movement, circus, street performances, immersive theater, puppet theater, shadow theater, and multimedia theater. The festival also includes contemporary dance, movement, and music performances such as opera, classical music, musical theater, contemporary music, jazz, folk music, and other forms of performing arts.

== Budget ==
Despite being an NGO, the HighFest festival receives governmental support. The festival's budget is primarily funded through an allocation from the Armenian Ministry of Culture and other sponsors, which are governmental or semi-governmental entities. Additionally, many countries, such as the United Kingdom, France, and the United States, cover the travel expenses of their artistic groups through their consulates.
