= Seventy Thirty =

- Directed by: Bahram Afshari
- Written by: Hamzeh Salehi
- Produced by: Seyed Ebrahim Aamerian
- Starring: Bahram Afshari; Hootan Shakiba; Sadaf Espahbodi; Elahe Hesari; Nahid Moslemi; Hossein Pakdel
- Cinematography: Rouzbeh Rayga
- Edited by: Hassan Ayoubi
- Music by: Amir Tavassoli
- Distributed by: Aamerian film and Filimo
- Release date: 27 November 2024
- Running time: 100 minutes
- Country: Iran
- Language: Persian
- Box office: 6.4 Milions$

Seventy Thirty (Persian: هفتاد سی) is a 2024 Iranian social comedy film directed by Bahram Afshari, produced by Seyed Ebrahim Aamerian, and written by Hamzeh Salehi. The film marks Afshari's directorial debut. He stars alongside Hootan Shakiba in the leading roles.

The film was released in Iranian cinemas on 27 November 2024 and grossed over 360 billion tomans, becoming the highest-grossing film in the history of Iranian cinema.

== Plot ==
Barat and Parviz try to keep Ya’ghoob—who has won a lottery prize—alive long enough for him to collect it, hoping to claim a share for themselves. However, a doctor informs them that Ya’ghoob will die soon, complicating their plan to benefit from his winnings.

== Cast ==
- Bahram Afshari as Barat Amini
- Hootan Shakiba as Parviz Ladari
- Sadaf Espahbodi as Kokab
- Mehdi Hosseini-Nia as Siavash
- Elahe Hesari as Parvaneh Ladari
- Siavash Tahmoures as Ya’ghoob Iraji
- Nahid Moslemi as Khatoon Sarmadi
- Hossein Pakdel as Doctor

== Reception ==
=== Gross ===
The film grossed over 360 billion tomans.

=== Reception ===
The film has been regarded as shallow, weak, and unsuccessful, from its comedic design to its other concerns. Although it attempts to avoid sexual humor, it fails to create comedic situations without it. One review states:

"Almost all of Seventy Thirty's comedy revolves around Bahram Afshari insulting others with his distinctive accent. Remove the accent, and there is nothing in his character that is funny. The film's comedy is entirely contained in the characters’ dialogue, arguments, and shouting, and there is practically no situational comedy in the film."

Nevertheless, the film manages to keep a smile on the audience's face from beginning to end.

== See also ==
- List of highest-grossing Iranian films
