= Farzad Farzin =

Iranian singer (born 1981)

- فرزاد فرزین
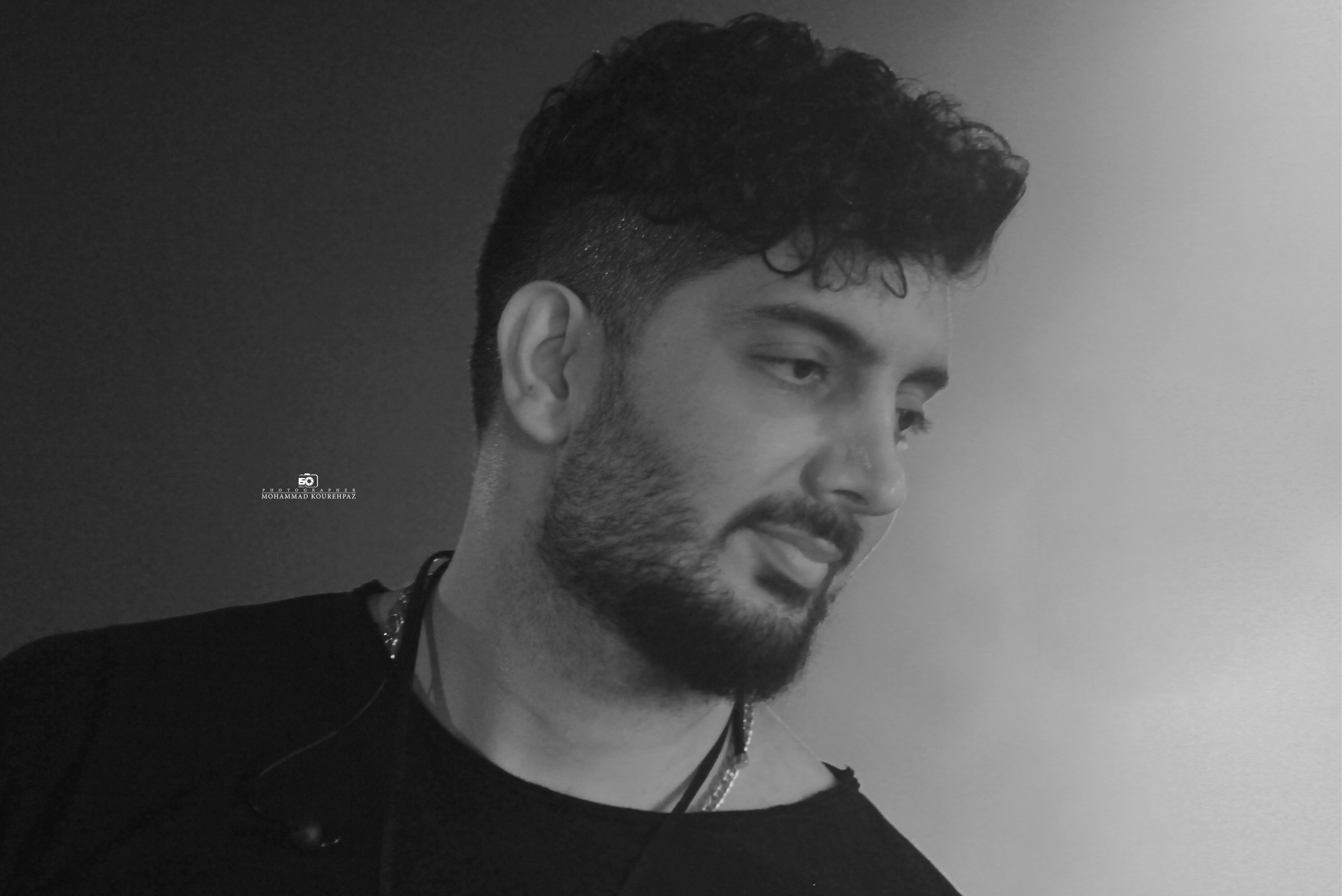
- Born: 24 June 1981 (age 45); Tehran, Iran
- Occupations: Musician, singer, songwriter, composer
- Musical career
- Genres: Persian Pop
- Instruments: Vocals; Guitar
- Years active: 2000–present
- Labels: Chehreye Khandan, IranGaam, Navaaye Raameshe
- Website: www.farzadfarzin.net

Farzad Farzin (Persian: فرزاد فرزین; born 24 June 1981 in Tehran, Iran) is an Iranian singer, songwriter, arranger, and actor.

== Career ==
=== Early years ===
Farzad was one of the founders and original band member of the Corouz Group in 2001. He left the band before they could release their first album. Farzad's spot in Corouz was taken by Shervin Sohrabian. Farzad had left Corouz Group for personal reasons, but did keep the rights to all songs he had created for Corouz Group.

=== Solo career ===
After many revisions in terms of content, title and record label, he finally was able to release his first (legal) album Sharaareh in 2005 on the Navaaye Raameshe label. His second (legal) album Shock took quite a while to see the light of day. Originally it was planned for release in 2006, but was postponed. This was mainly due to the fact that his new album(s) were leaked on the Internet prematurely. As a result, he had a hard time publishing and performing his work inside Iran legally. In the meantime he was able to give a couple of European concerts together with Mohsen Yeganeh in the Netherlands and Germany in May 2007. The second album Shock was finally released in 2008.

To avoid the same problems from recurring, Farzad tried to come to some sort of understanding with blogs and pirate websites not to freely distribute songs from his next album directly after its release in stores. For his third album, Shaans, Farzad was so afraid it would be leaked and bootlegged that he could not sleep for nights, and he released the album prematurely on a late afternoon with a misprinted cover While (legal) music television is non-existent inside Iran, it was quite a novelty that this album was promoted in movie theatres and on VCD/DVDs with a 3-minute music video medley featuring four of the new album's songs.

Late August 2010, he managed to make his European chart debut with the second song Chikeh Chikeh from his third album Shaans and managed to stay there for two weeks with an introduction to his new album. This received high attention in the Iranian on-line media.

=== Acting ===
Farzad Farzin also has a modest acting career. His first role was that of singer in the movie Pesaraane Ajori, directed by Majid Gharizadeh. Many years before that he appeared in many shortfilms as well as the TeleFilm Donyaaye Mahboob, directed by Arsalan Amirhosseini. Farzad Farzin recently starred in a motion picture about an aspiring singer whose biggest dream is to sing a song for the Persian Gulf while standing on a boat. He also featured on the soundtrack. He also acted in Sag haye poshali and in a serial called Asheghaneh.He is also a cast member of Mankan Serial.

== Filmography ==
=== Film ===
Year	Title	Role	Director	Notes	Ref(s)
2007	Brick Made Boys	Safa	Majid Gharizadeh		
2010	Concert on the Water		Jahangir Jahangiri		
2013	Straw Dogs		Reza Tavakoli		
2023	Duet Song	Ilia	Arezoo Arzanesh		

=== Web ===
Year	Title	Role	Director	Platform	Ref(s)
2017	Romance	Touraj Chelbiani / Farzad Farzin	Manouchehr Hadi		
2019–2020	Mannequin	Bahram	Hossein Soheilizadeh	Filimo, Namava	
2021	Queen of Beggars	Parsa Parsa (Barsam Afzali)	Hossein Soheilizadeh	Filimo	
2023–2024	Mafia Nights: Zodiac	Himself	Mohammad Reza Rezaeean	Filimo	
2023	Camp Nou	Shahab	Manouchehr Hadi	Filimo	
2024	The North Pole	Arsham Yekta	Amin Mahmoudi Yekta	Filimo	

== Discography ==
Farzad released the following albums with a government permit.

- Sharareh (Persian: شراره), Navaaye Raameshe (2005)
- Shock (Persian: شوک), IranGaam (2008)
- Chance (Persian: شانس), Chehreye Khandan (2010)
- Shot (Persian: شلیک), IranGaam (2012)
- Personal (Persian: شخصی), IranGaam (2014)
- Six (Persian: شش), HonareAval (2016)

The following albums were leaked on the Internet before Farzad was able to secure a government permit for official release. As a result, Farzad Farzin did not get the necessary permits and was even barred from publishing any work for a certain period of time.

- Chase (Persian: تعقیب)
- Threat (Persian: تهدید)
- Jazzab (Persian: جذاب), Avaye Doran (2019),(Arrangement By: Hamed Baradaran)
- Atish (Persian :اتیش)

=== Remixes ===
Farzad released officially a remix album for his track "Tabestooneh". and after that a remix album for another track "Atish"
