= Niloofar (film) =

2008 Iranian film by Sabine El Gemayel

- Directed by: Sabine El Gemayel
- Written by: Sabine El Gemayel
- Produced by: Jean Bréhat; Rachid Bouchareb; Fereshteh Taerpoor
- Starring: Shahab Hosseini; Amir Aghaei; Mobina Aynehdar
- Edited by: Bahram Dehghani
- Music by: Fardin Khalatbari
- Production companies: 3B Productions; Khaneh
- Distributed by: Tadrart Films
- Release date: 27 August 2008 (Canada)
- Running time: 82 minutes
- Countries: Iran; Lebanon; France
- Languages: Persian; Arabic

Niloofar is an Iranian drama film written and directed by Lebanese filmmaker Sabine El Gemayel. It is an international co-production between the French company Pyramide Films and companies in Lebanon and Iran. The film was released in 2008 and screened at the AFI Fest in Los Angeles that year.

The story focuses on a young girl just entering puberty. This new phase in her life marks her entry into the circle of women, which brings with it new cultural obligations that leave little room for her own personal quest.

Niloofar won the Best Feature Film and Best Actress award at the 2009 Noor Iranian Film Festival in Los Angeles.

== Synopsis ==
Niloofar, a twelve-year-old Iraqi girl, dreams of being able to read and write. Unfortunately, in her village only boys can go to school. Niloofar's mother, a midwife, pushes her to become her apprentice. During one of the deliveries, Niloofar meets an educated woman. In secret, she starts to teach Niloofar how to read and write.

In the meantime, Niloofar's father has bought a field of palms. The price: Niloofar, as soon as she is a woman. Niloofar is horrified by this and tries to postpone her periods. When her periods finally do arrive, she hides this from the community. But the truth cannot be hidden for long and one day her secret is exposed. Terrified Niloo must obey her father's word and marry a man who once had his own daughter put to death for loving a boy.

This boy was Niloo's uncle, Aziz. Aziz, haunted by the memory of the young lover he lost years before, feels compelled to help Niloo avert a similar destiny. Aziz devises a plan to help Niloo escape and the two set off together. Niloo's family is furious when they discover she is missing and vow to bring her back to face retribution for dishonoring the family. They send her stepbrother out to track Niloofar down and bring her back.

== Cast ==
- Roya Nonahali as Salmah
- Mobina Aynehdar as Niloofar
- Nayereh Farahani as Noor
- Shahab Hosseini as Aziz
- Hengameh Ghaziani as Firoozeh
- Tooraj Faramarzian as Uncle Akbar
- Sadegh Safaie as Abdollah
- Fatemeh Motamed Aria as Banoo
- Alireza Ziaijan as Said
- Miald Shirmohamadi as Amir
- Saghar Slolaymani as Zeinab
- Amir Aghaei as Sheik Abbas

== Production ==
=== Development ===
Writer and director Sabine El Gemayel based the script's story on a girl she met in Lebanon who was facing the prospect of an arranged marriage. Gemayel commented, however, that the issues raised in the film are not specific to one culture, saying, "It’s a humanist film that’s critical of a specific tradition, not a culture ... I did not want to make a film that was anti-Arab.”

=== Filming ===
Niloofar was filmed in Iran in 2007 over a 53-day shoot.

== Critical reception ==
The film received critical acclaim. In a positive review of a screening at the AFI Fest, the AP said, "writer-director Sabine El Gemayel evinces a poetic eye for the colors and textures of domestic life" and the film "is direct and elliptical, contemporary and timeless".

Robert Koehler of Variety was more critical, writing the film is "a wobbly variation on the familiar theme of tradition-bound girls growing up in the 21st century".

== Festivals ==
- Montréal World Film Festival
- AFI Fest
- Berlin International Film Festival
- Zlín International Film Festival for Children and Youth
- Rehoboth Beach Independent Film Festival
- Noor Iranian Film Festival - Winner - Best Feature and Best Actress for Roya Nonahali
