= Be Like Others =

- Cover of Amazon Prime US release
- Directed by: Tanaz Eshaghian
- Written by: Tanaz Eshaghian
- Produced by: Tanaz Eshaghian; Christoph Jorg
- Cinematography: Amir Hosseini
- Edited by: Jay Freund
- Music by: Henning Lohner
- Distributed by: The Film Collaborative
- Release date: 19 January 2008 (Sundance Film Festival)
- Running time: 74 minutes
- Countries: Canada, United Kingdom, United States, France
- Language: Persian

Be Like Others: The Story of Transgendered Young Women Living in Iran (also known as Transsexual in Iran) is a 2008 documentary film written and directed by Tanaz Eshaghian about trans people in Iran. It explores issues of gender and sexual identity while following the personal stories of some of the patients at a Tehran gender reassignment clinic. The film played at the Sundance Film Festival and the Berlin International Film Festival, winning three awards.

== Overview ==
Although homosexual relationships are illegal (punishable by death) in Iran, sex reassignment operations are permitted. In 1987, Islamic leader Ayatollah Khomeini passed a fatwa allowing sex-change operations as a cure for "diagnosed transsexuals". Be Like Others shows the experiences of male and female patients at Dr. Bahram Mir-Jalali's Mirdamad Surgical Centre, a sex-reassignment clinic in Tehran. One of them is Ali Askar, a 24-year-old man who faces harassment from other men due to his feminine appearance and behaviour. He does not want to become a woman but sees no other options for him in Iranian society. He decides to go ahead with the surgery despite death threats from his father and finds support from Vida, a post-operative transsexual he meets at the clinic. By the end of the film, Ali has become a woman named Negar. She has been disowned by her family, experienced depression and has had to work as a prostitute. Twenty-year-old Anoosh is another young man who has been ostracised due to his femininity. His boyfriend feels more comfortable when Anoosh dresses as a woman, and in contrast to Ali, Anoosh's mother is supportive of his desire to change sex. The end of the film shows Anoosh – now Anahita – happy and engaged to her boyfriend. However, her boyfriend has become increasingly distant since Anahita had her surgery.

Throughout the film, the patients of the sex-reassignment clinic assert that they are not homosexual, seeing homosexuality as something that is shameful and immoral. Eshaghian's opinion is that this shame is the driving force behind so many Iranians deciding to change their sex. She says that identifying as transsexual rather than homosexual allows them to live free from harassment. The film follows the lives of individuals undergoing this procedure and gives viewers a look into what life is like afterwards.

== Production ==
Eshaghian, an Iranian American film-maker, got the idea for Be Like Others after reading a 2004 article in The New York Times about sex-change operations happening in Iran and being surprised that such an operation would be acceptable in a Muslim country. She wrote a proposal for a film and tried to find funding, but was unsuccessful. She contacted a British journalist who had written on the subject and he gave her telephone numbers for Dr. Bahram Mir-Jalali and the Muslim cleric featured in the film. To find subjects, she visited the predominant sex-reassignment clinic in Iran, and spent time in the waiting-room talking to patients and their families. She found that female-to-male transsexuals were generally very successful in living as their new gender and as a result were reluctant to take part in the documentary for fear of being "outed" as transsexual. She felt that the contrasting stories of Ali and Anoosh highlighted the importance of family bonds in Iranian society. At a question and answer session at the Sundance Film Festival, Eshaghian said that one of the men she met while filming decided to live as a gay man rather than become a woman, and that she is now trying to help him leave Iran.

== Distribution and reception ==
In 2008, Be Like Others was screened at the Sundance Film Festival, where it was nominated for the Grand Jury Prize and the Berlin International Film Festival where it won three Teddy Awards, the Amnesty International Film Prize – Special Mention, Reader Jury of the Siegessäule and the Jury Award. The film was shown on BBC television as Transsexual in Iran in February 2008. It screened at the Seattle International Film Festival in June 2008. Writing for Variety, Robert Koehler called Be Like Others "a powerful window into a once-hidden side of the country" and "a model of non-dogmatic filmmaking on a highly charged topic."

In 2010, Be Like Others was nominated for a GLAAD Media Award for "Outstanding Documentary" during the 21st GLAAD Media Awards. In 2012, the film screened at the Noor Iranian Film Festival and won Best Documentary.

== See also ==
- LGBT rights in Iran
- Transgender rights in Iran
- List of LGBT films directed by women
