= Bam 6.6 =

- Directed by: Jahangir Golestanparast
- Produced by: Jahangir Golestanparast
- Release date: 2007
- Country: Iran

Bam 6.6 is a documentary about the 2003 Bam earthquake in Iran. The film, subtitled "Humanity has no Borders", was produced and directed by Jahangir Golestanparast.

The film documents the plight of American tourists Tobb Dell'Oro and his Jewish fiancée, Adele Freedman, after they are buried under the quake's rubble. Particular attention is paid to the ways in which grief-stricken Iranians make efforts to treat the couple's injuries and comfort Adele afterwards. The film's format combines footage of the earthquake with interviews of survivors and people who coordinated humanitarian efforts.

== Release ==
Bam 6.6 premiered at the United Nations Association Film Festival in October 2007, nearly four years after the earthquake struck. An updated release includes supplemental footage and additional interviews with witnesses, victims, and aid workers.

== Awards ==
- Winner, Best Story at the 2008 Noor Iranian Film Festival
- Winner, Best Documentary at the 2008 Noor Iranian Film Festival
- Winner, Best Director at the 2008 Noor Iranian Film Festival

== See also ==
- Voices of Bam
- United States-Iran relations
- History of the Jews in Iran
