= Noor Iranian Film Festival =

The Noor Iranian Film Festival is an annual film festival held in Los Angeles, California, founded by cultural producer Siamak Ghahremani and co-founder Anthony Azizi in 2007. The festival's namesake comes from the word Nur, also spelled Noor, meaning to shed light or "noor," on Iranian culture and heritage through Iranian cinema. A non-profit, non-religious, and non-political organization, the Noor Iranian Film Festival (NIFF) was created to shed light, or ‘noor,’ on Persian culture, helping to express the beauty of a culture that is commonly misperceived due to its portrayal in the media. Additional to the main annual festival in Los Angeles, a tour of the program has made several return trips to cities such as Daytona Beach, San Diego, San Francisco, Seattle, and Washington D.C.

The Los Angeles festival has been held at such venues as the James Bridges Theater on the UCLA Campus, Laemmle's Music Hall 3 in Beverly Hills and Magnin Auditorium at the Skirball Cultural Center. It has taken place every year since 2007, with the exception of 2010, where due to Iran's political uprising in 2010, and out of respect for the people in Iran, the festival decided to postpone its 4th festival to 2011. The postponement was also due to a lack of sponsorship and seed money for the festival.

== Programming ==
The program blocks have included feature films, documentaries, short films and animated films, all of which were selected to shed light on Iranian culture and heritage. Their submission guidelines for filmmakers state: "NIFF accepts films from Iranian filmmakers, films made about Iran or Iranians, and/or films that include Iranians as part of the cast or crew."

== Judges ==
1st Annual Noor Film Festival Judges

- Natasha Henstridge, Maz Jobrani, Harry Lennix, Shaun Toub, Kyle Secor

2nd Annual Noor Film Festival Judges

- Shohreh Aghdashloo, Reza Badiyi, Rainn Wilson, Omid Djalili, Ever Carradine

3rd Annual Noor Film Festival Judges

- Brooke Adams, Esai Morales, Habib Zargarpour, Rudi Bakhtiar, Ali Pourtash

4th Annual Noor Film Festival Judges

- Corey Feldman, Kami Asgar, Max Martini, Bai Ling, Frances Fisher

5th Annual Noor Film Festival Judges

- Navid Negahban, Homa Sarshar, Behrouz Vossoughi, Tony Plana, Kristoff St. John

6th Annual Noor Film Festival Judges

- Marshall Manesh, Dennis Haysbert, Faraj Heidari

7th Annual Noor Film Festival Judges

- Omid Abtahi, Mahnaz Afshar, Catherine Dent

8th Annual Noor Film Festival judges

- Reza Sixo Safai, Mozhan Marno, Ayat Najafi

== Awards ==
Additional to judged awards for films screened at the festival, the event selects honorary recipients with a career achievement award. In 2013 the festival announced that the Achievement Award would be renamed the Reza Badiyi Achievement Award, in honor of the director/producer Reza Badiyi, recipient of the festival's first Achievement Award in 2009.

=== Achievement Awards ===
Year	Recipient	Role
2009	Reza Badiyi	Producer, director
2011	Bob Yari	Producer
2013	Shohreh Aghdashloo	Actress
2014	Shaun Toub	Actor

=== Film Awards ===
==== 2007 ====
Award	Recipient	Film
Theme Award	Ryan Haidarian	Aref
Audience Favorite	Mohammad Shirvani	President Mir Qanbar
Best Comedy	Kaveh Sejadhosseini	Cold City
Best Animation	Amir Mehran	The Lost Waves
Best Story	Bahman Dadfar	Flying Next to the Red Chair
Best Drama	Sasan Saleimani	It Takes Time As Smoking A Cig
Best Documentary	Mehdi Rahmani	The Autumn Boys
Best Director	Shahram Mokri	The Dragonfly Storm (short)

==== 2008 ====
Award	Recipient	Film
Theme Award	Armin Palangi	Hidden Generation
Audience Favorite	Aryana Farshad	Mystic Iran
Best Animation	Saeid Ghahari	Rebirth of Rostam
Best Story	Jahangir Golestan	Bam 6.6
Best Documentary	Jahangir Golestan	Bam 6.6
Best Director	Jahangir Golestan	Bam 6.6

==== 2009 ====
Award	Recipient	Film
Best Feature Film	Sabine El Gemayel	Niloofar
Audience Favorite	Faramarz Rahber	Donkey in Lahore
Best Documentary	Faramarz Rahber	Donkey in Lahore
Best Director	Faramarz Rahber	Donkey in Lahore
Best Story	Mohammad Nourizad	Flags of Kaveh's Castle
Best Actor	Abazar Noorizad	Flags of Kaveh's Castle
Best Actress	Mobina Aynehdar	Niloofar
Best Short Film	Ladan Yalzadeh	The Florist

==== 2011 ====
Award	Recipient	Film
Audience Favorite	Maryam Keshavarz	Circumstance
Best Director	Maryam Keshavarz	Circumstance
Best Actress	Nikohl Boosheri	Circumstance
Best Actor	Navid Negahban	Liberation (Short)
Best Story	Jon Goldman	Diplomacy
Best Short Film	Jon Goldman	Diplomacy
Best Documentary	Joe Ayella	American Coup
Best Animation	Ameneh Eslami	Little Tale of Us

==== 2012 ====
Award	Recipient	Film
Audience Favorite	Morteza Rezvani	The Iran I Remember
Best Feature Film	Dave Moutray/Shahaub Roudbari	Losing Her
Best Feature Film Director	Esmaeel Mihandoust	A Very Close Encounter
Best Documentary	Tanaz Eshaghian	Be Like Others
Best Documentary Director	Beate Petersen	Nasseredin Shah and his 84 Wives
Best Story	Ala Mohensi	My City Pizza
Best Short Film	Ana Lily Amirpour	A Girl Walks Home Alone at Night
Best Short Film Director	Ana Lily Amirpour	Pashmaloo

==== 2013 ====
Award	Recipient	Film
Audience Favorite	Peyman Moaadi	Snow on Pines
Best Feature Film	Youssef Delara/Michael D. Olmos	Filly Brown
Best Feature Film Director	Marjane Satrapi/Vincent Paronnaud	Chicken with Plums
Best Documentary	Aref Mohammadi	A Survivor from Magadan
Best Documentary Director	Nahid Persson Sarvestani	My Stolen Revolution
Best Story	Aref Mohammadi	A Survivor from Magadan
Best Short Film	Neysan Sobhani	Dimensions
Best Short Film Director	Parish Rahbar	Fade
Best Animation	Mo Davoudian	Pepe and Lucas
Best Animation Director	Mo Davoudian	Pepe and Lucas

2014

Award	Recipient	Film
Best short film	Ali Asgari	More Than Two Hours
Best Short film Director	Ethan Rains	Still Here
Best Animation	Behrouz Bagheri	The Hard Dream
Best Documentary	Iran's Unwanted Sons and daughters	Out of Rain
Best Documentary Director	Ayat Najafi	No Land's Song
Best Feature film	Mohammadreza Vatandoust	When The Lemons Turned Yellow
Best Film Director	Desiree Akhavan	Appropriate Behavior
Best Story or Idea	Nima Shayeghi	Boys With Broken Ears
Audience Favorite	K-von Moezzi	Nowruz: Lost & found

2016

Award	Recipient	Film
Best Feature Film	Salem Salavati	The Last Winter
Best Short Film	Ali Asghari	The Baby
Best Documentary	Shahriar Siami Shal	Out Of Focus
Best Animation	Maryam Farahzadi	The Role Of Each Fret
Best Short Documentary	Hilda Hashempour	I.D.

== See also ==
- History of the Iranians in Los Angeles
