= Maryam Palizban =

Iranian film and stage actress (born 1981)

- مریم پالیزبان
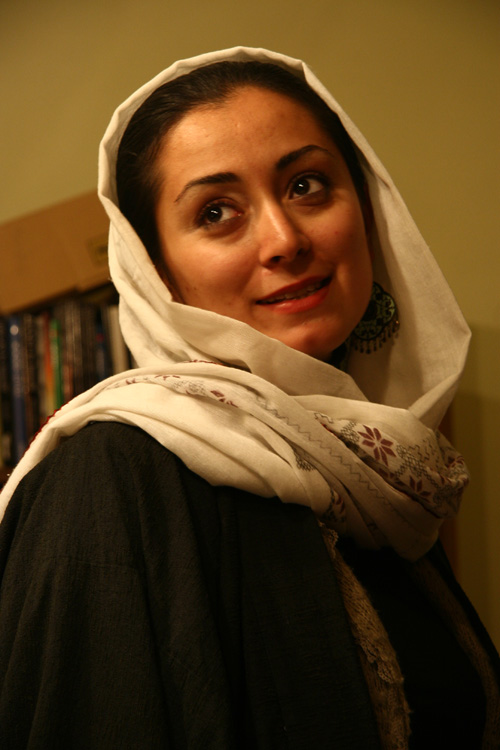
- Born: October 6, 1981 (age 44); Urmia, Iran
- Education: Ph.D. from Free University Berlin, Germany - Philosophy and Humanities (Institute for Theater Studies); University of Tehran
- Occupations: Actress, Poet
- Years active: 1999-present
- Website: http://www.mpaliz.blogfa.com

Maryam Palizban (Persian: مریم پالیزبان) is an Iranian film and stage actress. She graduated in performing arts and theatre studies at Tehran University-Faculty of fine arts in 2004 and got her Ph.D. degree at the Free University Berlin, Germany in 2014.

She has been a research fellow on Performing martyrdom in ta'ziyeh as Shi'a Theatre-Ritual: "Martyrs on the Stage" within the project "Figurations of the Martyr in Near Eastern and European Literature” from 2012 to 2014 at the Center for literary and cultural research Berlin (ZfL).

Her KHK (Käte Hamburger Kollegs) project is entitled "The Theatrical Space of Beliefs, Transcendence and Immanence in Roman-Catholic and Shi'a-Islam: From Napoli to Rasht".

She played a leading part in Deep Breath, for which she was nominated as best actress by the Cinema Academy, 21st Fajr International Film Festival. Other Iranian movies in which she appeared are Fat Shaker (2013) and Lantouri (2016).

== Filmography ==
- Deep Breath (2003)
- Fat Shaker (2013)
- Lantouri (2016)

== See also ==
- Parviz Shahbazi

== Sources ==
- Degaran Website
- www.lettersfromtentland.com
- Palizban in Persian Wikipedia
