= Transgender rights in Iran =

Iran locator map

Transgender rights in Iran are limited, with a narrow degree of official recognition of transgender identities by the government, but with trans individuals facing very high levels of discrimination from the law, the state, and from wider society.

Before the Islamic Revolution in 1979, the issue of transgender identity in Iran had never been officially addressed by the government. Beginning in the mid-1980s, however, transgender individuals were officially recognized by the government, under condition of undergoing sex reassignment surgery, with some financial assistance being provided by the government for the costs of surgery, and with a change of sex marker on birth certificates available post-surgery.

Iran allows people who identify as female to participate in women's sports if they have had genital reassignment surgery.

However, substantial legal and societal barriers exist in Iran. Transgender individuals who do not undergo surgery have no legal recognition and those that do are first submitted to a long and invasive process, including virginity tests, formal parental approval, psychological counseling that reinforces feelings of shame, and inspection by the Family Court. In addition, non-binary genders are not recognized in Iran and the quality of trans healthcare in the country, including hormone therapy and reconstruction surgeries, is often very low.

Iranian officials have said that transgender people have "a special physical and psychological condition", and they most usually classify this as "gender identity disorder", which is considered to be outdated by the ICD-11's most recent versions. Iran has no laws protecting trans people against stigmatization or hate crimes. Transgender individuals also face extreme social pressures to hide the fact that they are transgender, often being forced to move to a new city, cut ties with any previous relationships, and conform to the strict sex segregation in Iran. Harassment against transgender individuals is common within Iran, and trans people face increased risk of physical and sexual assault, exclusion from education and jobs, poverty, and homelessness.

The United Nations Human Rights Council has reported that "lesbian, gay, bisexual and transgender children are subjected to electric shocks and the administration of hormones and strong psychoactive medications".

== History ==
=== Pre-1979 ===
There is evidence of third genders existing in civilisations in the region that is now Iran dating back thousands of years. A 2018 study of burial sites at Teppe Hasanlu found that around 20% of the tombs did not conform to a binary gender-divided distribution of artifacts or showed signs of the buried having performed masculine roles while wearing feminine dressing (or vice-versa). A bowl at the site was also discovered depicting a bearded man wearing female clothing shown sitting on the floor, a position that was usually reserved for women in the local iconography.

Surgery for intersex conditions have been practiced in Iran since the 1930s. In 1963, Ayatollah Ruhollah Khomeini wrote a book in which he stated that there was no religious restriction on corrective surgery for intersex individuals, though this did not apply to those without physical ambiguity in sex organs. At the time Khomeini was a radical, anti-Shah revolutionary and his fatwas did not carry any weight with the Imperial government, which did not have any specific policies regarding transgender individuals.

=== After the revolution ===
The new religious government that came to be established after the 1979 Iranian Revolution classed transgender people and crossdressers with gays and lesbians, who were condemned in Shah's era and faced the punishment of lashing or even death under Iran's penal code.

One early campaigner for transgender rights was Maryam Hatoon Molkara, a transgender woman. Before the revolution, she had longed to become physically female but could not afford surgery and wanted religious authorization. In 1975, she began to write letters to Khomeini, who was to become the leader of the revolution and was in exile. After the revolution, she was fired, forcibly injected with male hormones, and institutionalized. She was later released with help from her connections and continued to lobby many other leaders. Later she went to see Khomeini, who had returned to Iran. During this visit, she was subjected to beatings from his guards because she was wearing a binder and they suspected she could be armed. Khomeini, however, did give her a letter to authorize her sex reassignment operation, which she later did in 1997. Due to this fatwa, issued in 1987, transgender women in Iran have been able to live as women until they can afford surgery, have surgical reassignment, have their birth certificates and all official documents issued to them in their new gender, and marry men.

Khomeini's original fatwa was reconfirmed by the second supreme leader of Iran, Ali Khamenei, and is also supported by many other Iranian clerics. Hojatoleslam Kariminia, a mid-level cleric who is in favor of transgender rights, has stated that he wishes "to suggest that the right of transsexuals to change their gender is a human right" and that he is attempting to "introduce transsexuals to the people through my work and in fact remove the stigma or the insults that sometimes attach to these people." In 2010, the Iranian Legal Medicine Organization formulated the first national standardised protocol of the diagnosis and treatment of gender dysphoria. In 2014, the Transgender Studies Center was founded as part of the Mashhad University of Medical Sciences.

== Discrimination ==
There is a great deal of stigma attached to the idea of transgender identity and gender reassignment in ordinary Iranian society, and most transgender people, after completing their transition, are advised to maintain discretion about their past. Trans people are subject to employment discrimination, rejection by their families and communities, police abuse, and depression. Because they are typically rejected by their families and social networks, where Iranians usually look to for financial support and employment opportunities, they are often forced into sex work and sometimes commit suicide. A 2021 study in Health Care for Women International found that 92% of trans women in Iran had faced verbal or emotional violence and over 70% had faced physical violence. The study further found that "most people do not report this violence to the authorities and believe that reporting is useless." Most participants in a 2018 study in Quality & Quantity had "experiences of being accused, arrested, and physically abused by the police" and faced discrimination in the workplace, including being fired for being trans.

Division between trans men and trans women portrays trans men as more "real" or valid than trans women.

A 2016 report by OutRight Action International found that "trans Iranians continue to face serious discrimination and abuse in both law and practice, and they are rarely treated as equal members of society" and that "the Iranian trans community faces pressure from both state and non-state actors, ranging from hostile public attitudes to acts of extreme violence, risk of arrest, detention, and prosecution." The report noted that Iranian police would often arrest anyone they suspected of being trans and would hold them in custody until they could complete an official investigation to determine that the arrested individual was legally recognised as trans. Police would also frequently target trans people for flogging under anti-cross-dressing rules. Justice for Iran has found that "censorship laws prevent access to accurate information on matters relating to sexual orientation and gender identity."

Trans people are banned from serving in the Iranian military and issued specific exemption cards by the military. This practice of identifying transgender individuals put them at risk of physical abuse and discrimination.

=== Asylum seekers ===
A high number of transgender individuals from Iran have fled the country and attempted to seek asylum elsewhere. Some refugees have reported facing discrimination and being shunned by Iranian expat communities in the countries that they end up gaining asylum in. Refugees can also face issues regarding legal gender recognition and healthcare in their countries of asylum.

In 2020, protests were held in Iceland over the potential deportation of a trans teenager from Iran who was seeking asylum. The teen had originally intended to seek asylum in Portugal, but had been forced to leave the country and flee to Iceland after the Iranian Revolutionary Guard attempted to arrest him and forcibly return him to Iran.

== Healthcare ==
According to the Center for Human Rights in Iran: "SRS in Iran is extremely dangerous — while subsidized by the state, the pre-surgery process is abusive, the surgery is typically performed by ill-trained surgeons, and botched procedures and poor follow-up care often result in permanent medical complications." According to Justice for Iran, the Iranian state fails to "ensure that SRS surgeons and other health care professionals dealing with [transgender people] meet appropriate standards of education, skill and ethical codes of conduct" and that trans people face difficulty accessing proper information on healthcare, which "results directly from the government and its associated medical entities withholding or intentionally misrepresenting modern, scientific information on matters of sexual orientation and gender identity." Regulations around transgender healthcare in Iran do not meet the World Professional Association for Transgender Health's Standards of Care.

=== Procedures ===
The process of undergoing sex reassignment surgery is extensive and arduous, and is restricted to those over the age of 18. There further exists a requirement for adult trans individuals to provide formal certification of parental approval to be issued a permit for surgery. People who so much as question their sexuality are encouraged to see a psychologist, and they are usually recommended to undergo sex reassignment surgery in order to fit in with the strict gender binary that is present in Iran. There is no procedure that allows non-binary individuals access to healthcare.

Following approval from the psychiatrist, people are then referred to the Iranian family court, which reviews the case with a committee from the Iranian Legal Medicine Organization. The Legal Medicine Organization performs a number of tests, including at least six months of individual and group therapy sessions, interviews with family members, physical examinations, hormone tests, and chromosomal tests, in a process known as "filtering". Filtering is the separation of homosexuals, who are deemed "deviant", from transsexuals, who are deemed "curable" by undergoing surgery. If the Legal Medicine Organization formally concludes that the individual suffers from gender dysphoria, the Family Court then issues formal legal permission for the individual to undergo reassignment. Once a transgender individual has undergone sex reassignment, the Family Court orders a further set of examinations to confirm that reassignment has taken place, including the sterilisation of the individual. The Family Court then issues formal legal permission for the individual to legally become the new sex, with legal documents, such as birth certificates and passports, changed accordingly.

=== Funding and legality ===
Sex change surgery is not actually legal under Iranian civil law, although the operations are carried out. Iranian law has both secular and religious components, and secular jurisprudence says nothing about transgender issues. In this case, Sharia and fatwas take up the slack until it does, and it is under the religious law and Khomeini's fatwa during the interlude that surgery can be carried out. The government has officially provided transgender persons financial assistance in the form of grants and loans of up to 55 million rial (US$1,841). However, subsidies for healthcare rarely cover a significant portion of the healthcare costs, leaving healthcare inaccessible to most trans individuals. Furthermore, in several parts of the country, subsidies have been suspended on the pretext of insufficient government funds.

=== International reports ===
UNHCR's 2001 report says that sex reassignment surgery is performed frequently and openly in Iran, and that homosexual and cross-dressing men, although unrelated to trans identity, would be safe as long as they keep a low profile. However, the Safra Project's 2004 report considers UNHCR's report over-optimistic. The Safra Project's report suggests that UNHCR underestimated legal pressure over transgender and LGBT matters. The Safra Project report further states that currently, it is not possible for presumed transgender individuals to choose not to undergo surgery - if they are approved for sex reassignment, they are expected to undergo treatment immediately. Those who wish to remain "non-operative" (as well as those who cross-dress and/or identify as genderqueer) are considered their gender assigned at birth, and as such they are likely to face harassment as being homosexuals and subject to the same laws barring homosexual acts.

The 2016 OutRight Action International report noted that access to healthcare was severely limited for those who could not afford it and that the healthcare system would often refuse to approve individuals who suffered from additional health issues for medical transition (and hence legal rights), citing one doctor on AsrIran claiming that "not everyone who wants to change their gender suffers from gender identity disorder[sic]." The report also found that many psychologists would encourage parents to actively discourage young children from displaying gender non-conforming behaviour. As well, the report highlighted a culture of gatekeeping in the healthcare system, often imposing extremely long waiting periods on patients out of a belief that it would lower regret rates. A doctor at the Legal Medicine Organization stated that less than half of those who had applied between 1987 and 2004 had been given authorisation for GRS.

=== Health demographics ===
A 2022 study in the Archives of Sexual Behavior estimated that there were around 1.46 trans individuals per 100 000 Iranians, with 839 individuals being deemed eligible for reassignment by the Iranian Legal Medicine Organization between 2012 and 2017. Of those 839 individuals, around two-thirds were trans men and one third were trans women, with an average age of around 25 and around one third being located in Tehran, with 6 out of the 31 Iranian provinces having no recorded individuals. Between 2006 and 2010, the government issued 1366 permits for SRS.

A 2021 study in the Journal of Psychiatric Research found that "depressive and trauma- and stressor-related disorders" were common among trans people in Iran, with "as many as 70% of the clients reported that they had experienced suicidal ideation."

A 2016 study of 104 trans women in Tehran found an HIV prevalence of 1.9%. A 2009 study found no cases of HIV/AIDS among the 58 trans individuals tested.

=== Forced surgery for homosexual people ===
Media coverage has speculated that homosexual individuals are pressured to undergo medical reassignment as part of the Iranian state's oppression of homosexuality. A 2016 study found that European and American literature and media "has widely represented the Iranian authorities legalizing sex-change surgery" in light of the Iranian authorities' "punishments on gay people", and depict Iran's legalized transgender surgery "as an alternative way to force non-heteronormative genders to fit into categories of male and female in order to prevent acts that fall outside gender binaries." The 2016 study critiques that view and asserts instead that "sex change surgery is not understood by Iranian transsexuals as a way to fit themselves into the category of male or female; neither is it perceived as the last resort to live as a full member of society. Rather, it is understood as bringing the body closer to the soul." Two studies have contested the belief that social pressure made cisgender homosexuals undergo sex change surgery.

== Transgender community ==
Transgender people have formed non-governmental organizations and support groups in Iran. These groups provide information and skills to support transgender people, and work to combat social stigma. They often rely on the medical model and "treat" transgender identity as a disease. Although this contributes to the pathology of transgender experiences, it gives space for individuals to identify themselves without the judgement of moral deviancy and identify other internalized stigmas.

=== In popular media ===
Increased international attention to the Iranian transgender community and their legal status may have been a result of 2002 award-winning film Juste une femme (Just a Woman) by Mitra Farahani.

Transgender director Saman Arastoo directs plays about trans people in Iran, casting transgender actors in the roles.

== See also ==
- Transgender
- Transgender history
- Third gender
- Legal status of transgender people
- Legal status of gender-affirming healthcare
- Transgender rights movement
- Transgender rights in the United States
- Transphobia in the United States
- Heteronormativity
- LGBT rights in Iran
- Be Like Others, a documentary film about transgender people in Iran
- List of transgender-related topics

== Notes ==
- Robert Tait, A fatwa for transsexuals, and a similar article on The Guardian. Gives details on Molkara's plea.
- Frances Harrison, Iran's sex-change operations, BBC.
- UNHCR, Iran Country Report, 7th European Country of Origin Information Seminar Berlin, 11–12 June 2001 - Final report. Transsexual part is on pp. 104.
- Safra Project Country Information Report Iran. 2004 report, and consider UNHCR report underestimate the pressure. Mentions gender diversity on pp, 15.
