= The Death Bath =

2026 Iranian drama film

- Persian: زنده‌شور
- Directed by: Kazem Daneshi
- Written by: Mohammad Davoudi; Kazem Daneshi
- Produced by: Kazem Daneshi
- Starring: Bahram Afshari; Sara Bahrami; Amir Jafari; Shabnam Moghaddami; Hamed Behdad; Sadaf Asgari
- Cinematography: Parsa Majd
- Edited by: Khashayar Mohebian; Elaheh Izadi
- Music by: Karen Homayounfar
- Distributed by: Shayesteh Film
- Release dates: February 8, 2026 (Fajr International Film Festival); July 15, 2026 (Iran)
- Running time: 120 minutes
- Country: Iran
- Language: Persian

The Death Bath (Persian: زنده شور, romanized: Zendeh-Shour) is a 2026 Iranian drama film directed and produced by Kazem Daneshi, and written by Mohammad Davoudi and Daneshi. The film stars Bahram Afshari, Sara Bahrami, Amir Jafari, Shabnam Moghaddami, Hamed Behdad and Sadaf Asgari.

The film follows the final hours of several prisoners sentenced to death and the efforts of a prosecutor's representative to obtain forgiveness from the victims' families. The Death Bath premiered in the competition section of the 44th Fajr Film Festival in February 2026 and was released theatrically in Iran in July 2026.

== Plot ==
The film takes place during the final hours of several prisoners sentenced to death. A representative of the prosecutor is tasked with overseeing the execution proceedings while attempting to persuade the victims' families to forgive the prisoners and spare their lives. The story explores the themes of capital punishment, forgiveness, justice and the moral consequences of execution.

== Cast ==
- Bahram Afshari
- Sara Bahrami
- Amir Jafari
- Shabnam Moghaddami
- Hamed Behdad
- Sadaf Asgari
- Maral Farjad
- Mohammad Valizadegan
- Erfan Naseri
- Touraj Alvand
- Roya Javidnia
- Alireza Mohammadi-Ara

== Production ==
The film was directed and produced by Kazem Daneshi, who co-wrote the screenplay with Mohammad Davoudi. Daneshi stated at the film's press conference that the screenplay was jointly written by him and Davoudi, with the story developed around judicial issues and contemporary social conditions.

The film was produced as a social drama focusing on capital punishment and forgiveness. It was selected for the competition section of the 44th Fajr Film Festival, where it was screened on 8 February 2026.

== Release ==
The Death Bath premiered at the 44th Fajr Film Festival in February 2026. The film subsequently received a theatrical release in Iran in July 2026.

== Reception ==
The film received attention during the 44th Fajr Film Festival for its treatment of capital punishment, forgiveness and the judicial system. At its festival press conference, Daneshi described the film as being concerned with forgiveness rather than portraying the judicial system as inherently antagonistic.

A review published by Khabar Online described the film as a tense social drama centred on the question of forgiveness, while criticizing the second half of the film for becoming overly sentimental and its editing for weakening the overall impact of the story.

== Awards and nominations ==
At the 44th Fajr Film Festival, The Death Bath won five Crystal Simorgh awards, including Best Director for Kazem Daneshi, Best Actor for Bahram Afshari, Best Supporting Actress for Maral Farjad, Best Original Score for Karen Homayounfar, and the Audience Award for Best Film. It also received nominations in categories including Best Film, Best Screenplay, Best Supporting Actor, Best Editing, Best Sound Recording and Best Makeup.

Year	Festival	Category	Recipient	Result	Ref
2026	44th Fajr Film Festival	Best Original Score	Karen Homayounfar	Won	
2026	44th Fajr Film Festival	Best Supporting Actress	Maral Farjad	Won	
2026	44th Fajr Film Festival	Best Actor	Bahram Afshari	Won	
2026	44th Fajr Film Festival	Best Director	Kazem Daneshi	Won	
2026	44th Fajr Film Festival	Audience Award for Best Film	Kazem Daneshi	Won	
2026	44th Fajr Film Festival	Best Makeup	Mahmoud Dehghani	Nominated	
2026	44th Fajr Film Festival	Best Sound Recording	Rashid Daneshmand and Alireza Alavian	Nominated	
2026	44th Fajr Film Festival	Best Editing	Khashayar Mohebian	Nominated	
2026	44th Fajr Film Festival	Best Screenplay	Mohammad Davoudi and Kazem Daneshi	Nominated	
2026	44th Fajr Film Festival	Best Supporting Actor	Amir Jafari	Nominated	
2026	44th Fajr Film Festival	Best Film	Kazem Daneshi	Nominated	
