= Siamak Ghahremani =

- Born: January 7, 1974 (age 51); Iran
- Occupation(s): Actor, event producer, radio host
- Years active: 2007–present
- Known for: Founder of the Noor Iranian Film Festival, radio host for Radio Javan
- Spouse: Sharareh Ghahremani

Siamak Ghahremani (born January 7, 1974) is an Iranian American cultural event producer and radio host. He is a founder of the annual Noor Iranian Film Festival in Los Angeles and co-host of the talk show Popcorn on Radio Javan. He has also co-hosted the Sunday Morning Show on 670 AM KIRN. After the establishment of NIFF, Ghahremani started managing Iranian artists’ performance tours in the US. In 2017, Ghahremani managed TM Bax US tour.

== Early life and career ==
Ghahremani was born on January 7, 1974, in Iran, to parents who were of Baha’I religion. His family suffered religious persecution because the Baha’I religion was accorded no recognition in Iran. On a number of occasions Iranian prisons officials went to their house from Evin Prison but would not find them at home. Ghahremani was denied enrollment in schools in his district and had to travel about an hour to a school where the authorities there were considerate and tolerated Baha’i religion students. Ghahremani’s mother was denied access to proper medical attention when she had a miscarriage because of her religion. After this incident Ghahremani’s family tried to flee the country to Pakistan to seek asylum but were intercepted by the border and detained for weeks before being released due to the worsening health condition of his mother. They tried and succeeded in their second attempt to flee the country. Shortly after their arrival, his mother died at the age of 31 when Ghahremani was only twelve years old.

Ghahremani developed interest in movies when he was a kid as his mother took him to movies and began to like artists such as John Wayne and Anthony Quinn who were his mother’s favourite artists. During the Iranian revolution VCRs and movies were banned, they started renting boxes which contained a VHS player and a couple dozen movies inside. After the death of his mother he increased the frequency of his visit to movies to suppress the pains of his mother’s death. That exposure to film and cinema was the seed in developing and launching Noor Iranian Film Festival, the first Iranian Film Festival outside of Iran which worked closely with Hollywood stars such as Francis Fisher, Harry Lennix, Rain Wilson, Shohreh Aghdashloo, Behrouz Vossoughi, and Reza Badiyi.

== Noor Iranian Film Festival ==
In 2007, Ghahremani and actor Anthony Azizi founded the Noor Iranian Film Festival, with the determination to showcase the culture and heritage of Iranians around the world, through cultivation and promotion of Iranian-American talent in Hollywood. The festival has been held annual every year since 2007, with the exception of a postponement in 2010. It was the first Iranian Film Festival to occur outside of Iran.
