= Mohammad Shirvani =

Iranian alternative filmmaker (born 1973)

- محمد شیروانی
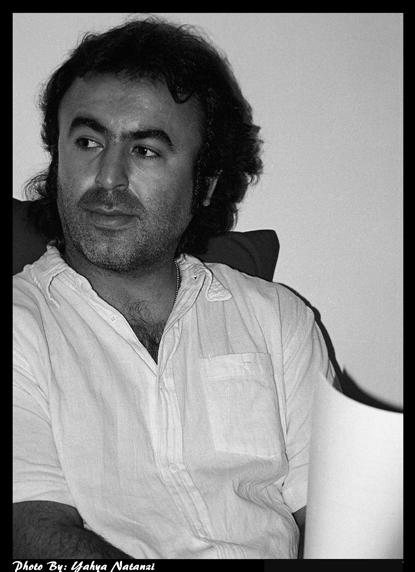
- Born: 1973 (age 52–53); Tehran, Imperial State of Iran
- Occupations: Film director; Screenwriter; Documentary film

Mohammad Shirvani is an Iranian alternative filmmaker. In 1998 He escaped from the military service to make his first short film “The circle”. In 1999 “The Circle” was selected for Critics' Week International Cannes festival. Being selected by Cannes Festival made a great impact on the young director and since then he has become a full time filmmaker. He has never limited his professional career and has made movies in every form including experimentals, documentaries, short films and feature films. His films have been screened in more than 400 international festivals and events. He won the Golden Tiger Award for Best Feature Film for “Fat Shaker” in Rotterdam, 2013.

== Filmography ==
=== Short films ===
Title	Time	Format	Year
The Circle	12 MIN	35MM	1999
The Candidate	15 MIN	DV-35MM	2000
To Consent	20 MIN	DV	2001
Souvenir	20 MIN	DV	2001
The Cherries Which Were Canned	13 MIN	35MM	2002
Iranian Conserve	14 MIN	DV	2003
The Calm City	2 MIN	DV	2005
Six Eyes	23 MIN	DV	2014
Tight Skin of the Ambiance	15 MIN	IPHONE 4	2014

=== Documentary films ===
Title	Time	Format	Year
Peresident Mir Qanbar	65 MIN	DV	2005
Where 's Leili	73 MIN	DV	2006
444Days	57 MIN	HDV	2007
Seven Blind Woman Filmmakers	106 MIN	DV	2004-2008
Iranian Cookbook	73 MIN	DV	2009
021, Tehran	51 MIN	HDV	2010
Telescope	78 MIN	HD	2011

=== Video art ===
Title	Time	Format	Year
The Calm City	2 MIN	DV	2005
Khayyam	5 MIN	HB	2008
Unit Further Notice	184 MIN	HDV	2008
Six Eyes	23 MIN	HD	2014

=== Feature films ===
Title	Time	Format	Year
Navel	82 MIN	DV-35MM	2002
Fat Shaker	84 MIN	HD	2013

=== Performance art ===
Title	location	Year
Open	Tehran	2011
Face of the Winner man	Tehran	2012
Phoenix, Lake Urmia or Iranian Independent Cinema	Urmia	2017

=== Installation art ===
Title	location	Year
Elephant in the Darkness	Rotterdam	2013

== Awards ==
- The Circle, Best Short Film - Fajr IFF - Tehran- 1999
- The Circle, Selected for Critics' Week International -Cannes IFF, France- 1999
- The Candidate, Grand Prize - Marseilles IDFF, 2000
- Iranian Conserve, Best Short Film - Cinema Tout Ecran IFF, Geneva - 2004
- Iranian Conserve, Jury Prize - Cracow IFF, Poland - 2005
- Navel, Grand Prize - Split IFF, Croatia - 2004
- President Mir Qanbar, Award of Excellence - Yamagata - IDFF, 2005
- President Mir Qanbar, Magnolia Award for Best Social Documentary - Shanghai TV IFF, 2006
- Iranian Cookbook, Best Experimental Documentary Film - Cinema Verite IDFF, Tehran - 2010
- Iranian Cookbook, Best Film of Audience Award . Yamagata IDFF, 2011
- Iranian Cookbook, Japan Community Cinema Center Award - Yamagata IDFF, 2011
- Fat Shaker, Tiger Award for The Best Film - Rotterdam IFF, 2013
