= The Orange Suit =

2012 film

- نارنجی‌پوش
- Directed by: Dariush Mehrjui
- Written by: Dariush Mehrjui
- Produced by: Dariush Mehrjui
- Cinematography: Farrokh Majidi
- Edited by: Hayedeh Safiyari
- Music by: Christophe Rezai
- Release date: February 2012 (Fajr)
- Country: Iran
- Language: Persian

The Orange Suit (Persian: نارنجی‌پوش, Narenji-Poush) is a 2012 film by the Iranian director Dariush Mehrjui. Mehrjui also co-wrote the script with Vahidéa Mohammadi. The film was lensed by Farrokh Majidi and starred Hamed Behdad, Homayoun Ershadi, Kianoosh Gerami, Mitra Hajjar, and Leila Hatami.
