= Iranian Legal Medicine Organization =

The Iranian Legal Medicine Organization (ILMO) (Persian: سازمان پزشکی قانونی) is a program under Iran's Judicial Branch. It is based in Tehran. In addition to publishing data about medical conditions and fatalities in the country, and releasing reports on injuries and fatalities due to natural disasters.

== History ==
1922, the first Office of Legal Medicine, in the Ministry of Justice, was established. Until 1942 forensics were done in private doctors offices.

In 2022 ILMO released a statement in which they claimed that Mahsa Amini's death was due to medication she had been taking, rather than due to police violence.

== Publications ==
ILMO owns the Iranian Journal of Forensic Medicine.
