= About Elly =

- Theatrical release poster
- Directed by: Asghar Farhadi
- Written by: Asghar Farhadi (screenplay); Azad Jafarian (thanks to)
- Produced by: Asghar Farhadi
- Starring: Taraneh Alidoosti; Golshifteh Farahani; Shahab Hosseini; Merila Zarei; Mani Haghighi; Peyman Moaadi; Rana Azadivar; Ahmad Mehranfar; Saber Abar
- Cinematography: Hossein Jafarian
- Edited by: Hayedeh Safiyari
- Distributed by: Dreamlab Films
- Release dates: February 1, 2009 (FIFF); February 7, 2009 (Berlinale)
- Running time: 119 minutes
- Country: Iran
- Language: Persian
- Box office: $879,422

About Elly (Persian: درباره الی, translit. Darbāre-ye Eli) is a 2009 Iranian drama film. The fourth film by filmmaker Asghar Farhadi, the film examines middle class relationships in Iran.

It received universal acclaim. Farhadi won the Silver Bear for Best Director at the 59th Berlin International Film Festival. The film was also nominated for 10 awards at the 27th Fajr International Film Festival in Tehran where Farhadi won the Crystal Simorgh for Best Director. About Elly was Iran's official submission for the competition in the Foreign Film section at the 82nd Academy Awards.

== Plot ==
A group of middle-class Iranians, former classmates at the law faculty of the university, go to the Caspian Sea for a three-day vacation: Sepideh, her husband Amir and their young daughter; Shohreh, her husband Peymān and their two children, including their son Arash; and Nāzy and her husband Manuchehr. Sepideh, who planned the trip, brings along her daughter's kindergarten teacher, Elly, in order to introduce her to Ahmad, a divorced friend visiting from Germany.

At the seaside mansion that Sepideh has booked, the woman in charge tells them the owners will return the next day and suggests that they stay instead in a deserted beach-front villa. Sepideh lies to the old woman about the relationship between Elly and Ahmad: she says they're married and on their honeymoon.

Elly is a little shy, but begins to feel interested in Ahmad, who seems to have feelings for her in return. She calls her mother and lies to her, saying that she's with her co-workers at a sea-side resort and that she expects to go back to Tehran the following day, as planned. She also asks her mother not to mention her visit to anyone else.

Sepideh, however, doesn't want Elly to leave and hides her luggage before leaving for an errand. One of the mothers asks Elly to watch the children playing at the seaside. Later, Arash is found floating in the sea while Elly is nowhere to be seen. Arash is resuscitated, but the group doesn't know whether Elly has drowned or has just left for Tehran. The police are called, while the group continues to search for Elly. The group starts to blame each other for the series of events leading up to her disappearance and her presence on the trip.

However, things are not as they seem, as it turns out that Sepideh has been lying and knew Elly was engaged to a man named Alireza. Since Elly was reluctant to marry Alireza, Sepideh insisted she come on the trip to meet Ahmad. Elly initially refused the invitation, as an engaged woman but, following pressure from Sepideh, eventually accepted. Alireza arrives and attacks Ahmad, then asks Sepideh whether Elly had refused her invitation to go on holiday. Sepideh wants to protect the honour of Elly and tell the truth but, following pressure from the others who feel threatened by Alireza, lies and tells him that Elly accepted the invitation without hesitation.

A body is found in the water, and Alireza identifies it as Elly in the mortuary, breaking down in tears.

== Cast ==
- Golshifteh Farahani as Sepideh
- Shahab Hosseini as Ahmad
- Taraneh Alidoosti as Elly
- Peyman Moaadi as Peymān
- Mani Haghighi as Amir
- Merila Zarei as Shohreh
- Ahmad Mehranfar as Manouchehr
- Rana Azadivar as Nāzy
- Saber Abar as Ali-Reza
- Amir Arsalan AleBouyeh as Peyman.
- Hossein Rahmani Manesh as Saman.

== Crew ==
- Sound recorder: Hassan Zahedi
- Sound mix: Mohammad-Reza Delpak
- Sound editor: Reza Narimizadeh

== Reception ==
The film was hailed critically upon the release in its home country. One year after its release, it was voted the 4th greatest Iranian movie of all time by the national society of Iranian critics. The review aggregator website Rotten Tomatoes reports a 99% approval rating with an average rating of 8.1/10 based on 70 reviews. The website's consensus reads, "About Elly offers viewers performances as powerful as its thought-provoking ideas, and adds another strong entry to Asghar Farhadi's impressive filmography." On Metacritic, the film holds a score of 87 out of 100 based on 29 reviews, indicating "universal acclaim".

One of the strongest supporters of About Elly is David Bordwell, film theorist and film critic, who has called it a masterpiece: "Gripping as sheer storytelling, the plot smoothly raises some unusual moral questions. It touches on masculine honor, on the way a thoughtless laugh can wound someone's feelings, on the extent to which we try to take charge of others' fates. I can't recall another film that so deeply examines the risks of telling lies to spare someone grief. But no more talk: The less you know in advance, the better. About Elly deserves worldwide distribution pronto."

Alissa Simon of Variety wrote in her review: "To many, the film's first half may seem mannered, even boring, with the old pals, particularly the men, indulging in obnoxious, condescending behavior. But after an alarming incident at the 45-minute mark, Farhadi ratchets up the tension, and the pic becomes a mystery thriller of sorts that epitomizes the Sir Walter Scott quote Oh what a tangled web we weave, when first we practice to deceive."

Adam Eisenberg in his review from Tribeca Film Festival called About Elly: "a mirror of sorts to Michelangelo Antonioni's stylistic revolution L'Avventura." And wrote: "Here the contrast between Farhadi and Antonioni is perhaps sharpest. Although L'Avventura is certainly cinematic with its relationship between images and themes, ... In Farhadi's world, cold glances, a husband's demand for more tea, and tearful rage, are all comments, not symbols, on a culture where telling the truth is often not the best option. It's a culture that lends itself to suspense, and Farhadi might have more in common with Hitchcock, than the Iranian New Wave he emerges from."

Christopher Bourne, upon seeing the film at the Tribeca Film Festival, said: "The brilliance of Farhadi's script and direction (his efforts earned him the Silver Bear for best director at this year's Berlin Film Festival) becomes most apparent in the latter stages of the film. As one secret after another is revealed, Farhadi deftly maps out the shifts in the perceptions and behavior of the characters toward each other as well as the viewer's perception of the characters."

Lee Marshall of Screen Daily called the film "One of the most remarkable Iranian films to surface in the last few years" and added: "About Elly is a small but compelling ensemble piece of surprising depth. It's one of those rare films that can be read on one level purely as a satisfying drama, but which also has a rich, independent inner life, centered on big questions about right and wrong, social coercion and the lies people tell themselves and each other."

== Accolades ==
- Won Asia Pacific Screen Award for Best Screenplay 2009 (Asghar Farhadi)
- Won Jury Grand Prize Asia Pacific Screen Award 2009 (Asghar Farhadi)
- Nominated Asia Pacific Screen Award for Best Film 2009 (Asghar Farhadi - Mahmoud Razavi)
- Nominated Asia Pacific Screen Award for Best Actress 2009 (Golshifteh Farahani)
- Won Asia-Pacific Film Festival for Best Screenplay 2009 (Asghar Farhadi)
- Won Special Jury Award Asia-Pacific Film Festival 2009 (Asghar Farhadi)
- Won Silver Berlin Bear for Best Director 2009 (Asghar Farhadi)
- Nominated Golden Berlin Bear 2009 (Asghar Farhadi)
- Nominated 27th Fajr International Film Festival for Best Actor 2009 (Shahab Hosseini)
- Won Netpac Award Brisbane International Film Festival 2009 (Asghar Farhadi)
- Nominated Golden Frog Camerimage for Main Competition 2009 (Hossein Jafarian)
- Nominated Gold Hugo Chicago International Film Festival for Best Feature 2009 (Asghar Farhadi)
- Won Crystal Simorgh for Audience Choice of Best Film in 27th Fajr International Film Festival 2009
- Won Crystal Simorgh for Best Director in 27th Fajr International Film Festival 2009 (Asghar Farhadi)
- Won Crystal Simorgh for Best Sound Fajr Film Festival 2009 (Mohammad Reza Delpak)
- Won Golden Crow Pheasant (Suvarna Chakoram) International Film Festival of Kerala for Director/Producer 2009
- Won Jury Award Tribeca Film Festival for Best Narrative Feature 2009 (Asghar Farhadi)
- Won Reader Jury of the "Standard" Vienna International Film Festival 2009
- House of Cinema Award for Best Actor 2010 (Shahab Hosseini)
- Nominated Asian Film Awards for Best Director 2010 (Asghar Farhadi)
- Nominated Asian Film Awards for Best Screenwriter 2010 (Asghar Farhadi)
