= Fat Shaker =

Fat Shaker (Original title: Larzanandeye charbi)
- Directed by: Mohammad Shirvani
- Produced by: Mohammad Shirvani
- Starring: Levon Haftvan; Maryam Palizban; Amir Salehian; Hassan Rostami; Navid Mohammadzadeh
- Release date: January 18, 2013 (US)
- Running time: 85 minutes
- Country: Iran

Fat Shaker (Persian: لرزاننده‌ی چربی - Larzanandeye charbi) is an Iranian drama film written and directed by Mohammad Shirvani. It had its première at the Sundance Film Festival in 2013, and also won the Tiger Award at the Rotterdam Film Festival.
