= Nezamoddin Kiaie =

Iranian sound engineer (1944–2026)

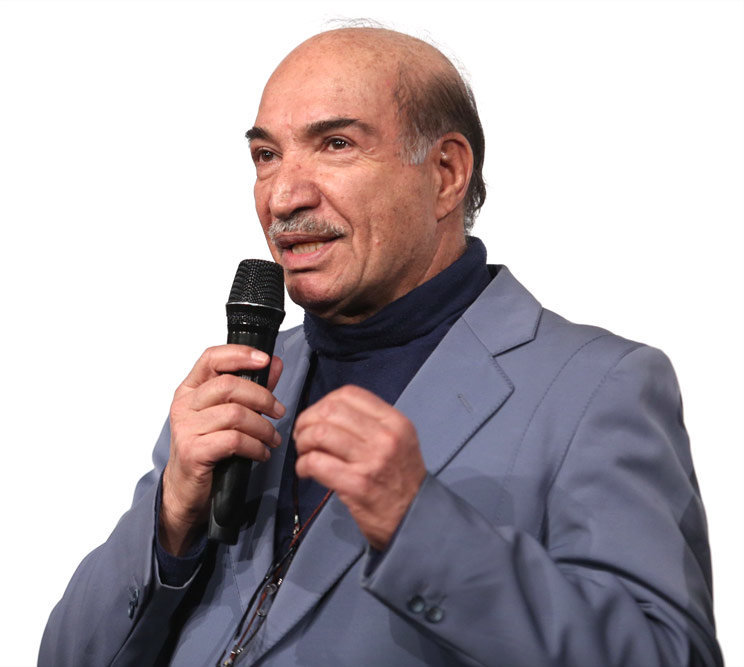
- Kiaie in 2015
- Born: 1944; Tehran, Iran
- Died: 6 February 2026 (aged 81–82)
- Occupation: Sound engineer
- Children: 1

Nezamoddin Kiaie (1944 – 6 February 2026) was an Iranian sound engineer. He won a Crystal Simorgh and was nominated for another one in the category Best Sound Recording for the films A Moment of Innocence and A Candle in the Wind.

Kiaie died on 6 February 2026.
