= Hatred (2012 film) =

- Film poster designed by Reza Mirkarimi
- بغض
- Directed by: Reza Dormishian
- Produced by: Gholamreza Mousavi
- Starring: Baran Kosari; Babak Hamidian; Mehran Ahmadi
- Cinematography: Turaj Aslani
- Edited by: Hayedeh Safiyari
- Distributed by: Filmiran
- Release date: 2012
- Running time: 84 min
- Countries: Iran; Turkey
- Languages: Persian; Turkish

Hatred (in Persian: بغض; transliterated: boqz) is a 2012 Iranian drama film directed by Reza Dormishian. It is set in Istanbul, Turkey and deals with Iranian youth immigration.

== Plot ==
Jaleh and Hamid are two youngsters from the third generation of Iranian immigrants in Turkey. Their families came to Turkey to have a peaceful life. Two parallel narrations from two different periods of the young characters' lives are presented. One narration is about their first days of meeting and happiness. The other is about the eight crucial hours when they commit a robbery so they can use the money to start a happy life somewhere else. However, as often happens in such cases, they are led in a different direction.

== Awards ==
- Camerimage International Film Festival, Bronze Frog Statue Award, Best Cinematography, for Turaj Aslani (director of photography), 2012
- 6th Iranian Critics and Film Writers, Best Director Award, for Reza Dormishian, 2014
- 6th Iranian Critics and Film Writers, Best Editor Award, for Hayedeh Safiyari, 2014
- 16th Celebration of Khaneh Cinema (The Iranian Alliance of Motion Picture Guilds), Best First Film Award, 2014

== Nominations ==
- Revelation Perth International Film Festival, nominated for Audience Choice Award, 2012
- Montréal World Film Festival, nominated for Golden Award, for Reza Dormishian, 2012
- Warsaw International Film Festival, nominated for Grand Prix, for Reza Dormishian, 2012
