= Lantouri =

2016 film

- Film poster
- Persian: لانتوری
- Directed by: Reza Dormishian
- Written by: Reza Dormishian
- Produced by: Reza Dormishian
- Starring: Navid Mohammadzadeh; Amir Salehian; Maryam Palizban; Baran Kowsari; Behrang Alavi; Amir Salehian; Mehdi; Hadi Ahmadi; Bahram Afshari
- Cinematography: Ashkan Ashkani
- Edited by: Hayedeh Safiyari
- Music by: Keyhan Kalhor
- Distributed by: Iranian Independents
- Release date: 1 February 2016 (Fajr IFF)
- Running time: 115 minutes
- Country: Iran
- Language: Persian

Lantouri (Persian: لانتوری) is a 2016 Iranian drama film written, directed and produced by Reza Dormishian. It was shown in the Panorama section at the 66th Berlin International Film Festival and in the Discoveries section of the 32nd Warsaw Film Festival. The film covers the story of throwing acid to the face of a young active journalist by a young man "Pasha" who is a leader of a gang of thieves and blackmailers. A gang that all of its members have been affected by injustice experiences in society.

== Plot ==
Pasha, the leader of the gang of Lantouri, falls in love with Maryam, a social activist and journalist who has started a campaign called "No to Violence" in order to convince the families of the crime victims to forgive the murderers of their love ones. Maryam rejects repeatedly Pasha‘s love and his feeling for her. Pasha loses his mind because of the rejection, splashes acid on Maryam‘s face and she loses her sight because of what Pasha did to her. Now, Maryam who previously convincing others to forgive criminals asks for justice and revenge, and requests “eye for eye” punishment.

== Cast ==
- Navid Mohammadzadeh as Pasha
- Maryam Palizban as Maryam
- Baran Kosari as Baran
- Mehdi Koushki
- Bahram Afshari as Bahram
- Behrang Alavi as Saeed (Maryam's friend)
- Reza Behboodi
- Behnaz Jafari
- Fatemeh Naghavi
- Kazem Sayahi
- Parivash Nazarieh
- Nader Falah
- Hojjat Hassanpour as Alireza
- Ardeshir Rostami
- Hossein Pakdel
- Setareh Pesyani
- Hadi Ahmadi
- Amir Salehian as Daryosh

== Awards and nominations ==
- 17th Hafez Awards Celebration, Abbas Kiarostami Memorial Medal Award, 2016
- 17th Buenos Aires International Human Rights Film Festival, Best Picture Film Award, 2017
- 34th Fajr International Film Festival, nominated for Crystal Simorq Award for Best Make-up artist, for Abdollah Eskandari and Mehrdad Mirkiani, 2016
- 34th Fajr International Film Festival, nominated for Crystal Simorq Award for Best Edith, for Hayedeh Safiyari, 2016
- 34th Fajr International Film Festival, Crystal Simorq Award for Best Sound, for Mohammad Reza Delpak, Saeed Bojnoordi, Hossein Mahdavi, 2016
- 32nd Warsaw International Film Festival, Competition 1-2, 2016
- 31st Mar del Plata International Film Festival, Special Screenings, Argentina, 2016
