= Reza Dormishian =

رضا درمیشیان Reza Dormishian
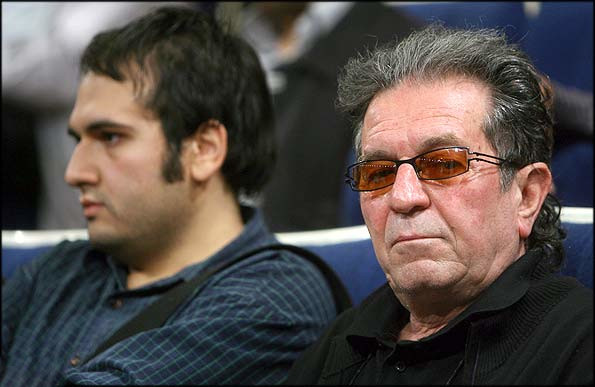
- Reza Dormishian With Darioush Mehrjoui
- Born: November 6, 1981 (age 44); Tehran, Iran
- Occupations: Writer; Screenwriter; Documentarian director Producer
- Years active: 1996–present

Reza Dormishian (Persian: رضا درمیشیان, born November 6, 1981) is an Iranian film director, screenwriter and film producer. He has worked as assistant director with notable directors such as Dariush Mehrjui, Fereydoun Jeyrani, and Alireza Davood Nejad.

== Career ==
He started writing as a film critic in 1997 for several newspapers. He later worked as an executive editor for cinema books and magazines. He was an assistant to some prestigious Iranian filmmakers, including Dariush Mehrjui and Alireza Davood Nejad. He has also worked as a screenwriter. He started making short films and documentaries in 2002.

Hatred was his first feature film, produced independently in Istanbul. Hatred displays the frenzied love and hatred and two accounts from two phases in the life of an Iranian refugee couple in Istanbul, Turkey. The film was received well by critics and cinema writers and the Iranian critics gave it three awards (Best Directing, Best Cinematography, and Best Editing). Although Hatred was censored to be screened in Iran, it was screened and praised in various festivals such as the Competition Section of the 36th Montreal World Film Festival in Canada, Competition Section of the 28th Warsaw Film Festival in Poland, and Competition Section of the Camerimage Film Festival in Poland.

His second feature, I'm not angry!, was the most controversial film of the Iranian cinema in 2014. This social drama criticizes the Ahmadinejad era, and it was the only Iranian film present in the Panorama Section of 64th Berlin International Film Festival. I'm not angry! was screened in the 32nd Fajr Film Festival while 15 minutes of it had been censored, and it was faced with warm welcome by the audience and grave opposition by extremist groups, to the extent that the cinema authorities stopped its screening. As the hardliners and extremists were going to attack the closing ceremony of the festival with 15 buses of their men, the festival authorities forced Reza Dormishian not to receive his awards and to withdraw his film from the festival, and they announced in the closing ceremony that Reza Dormishian had waived his awards to maintain calmness in the Iranian cinema. The jury members, however, revealed the next day that the awards had indeed belonged to I'm not angry! and that Dormishian had agreed to resignation under pressure.

Screening of I'm not angry! in Iran has been banned since then.

On 3 February 2026, Dormishian was among several figures in the Iranian film industry who signed a statement supporting the 2025–2026 Iranian protests and condemning the government's response to them.

== Filmography ==
Year	English title	Original title	Director	Screenwriter	Producer	Directing Advisor	First Assistant Director	Assistant Director	Line Producer	Year of Released	Note
2019	LA minor	LA-minor			YES						
2018	No Choice	Majbourim	YES	YES	YES					2020	Tokyo International Film Festival, “No Choice” by Reza Dormishian is an entry to the Tokyo Premiere section.
2017	White Chairs	Yavashaki	YES							2017	Premiered at the 41st International São Paulo Film Festival
2016	Lantouri	Lantouri	YES	YES	YES						
2014	I'm not Angry!	Asabani Nistam!	YES	YES	YES						
2013	Good to Be Back	Che Khoobe Ke Bargashti	YES								
2012	Hatred	Boqz	YES	YES							
2012	I Am a Mother	Man Mathar Hastam				YES		YES			
2012	Orange Suit	Narenji Poosh							YES		
2010	Fairy Tale	Gheseye Pariya						YES			
2010	Pamenar	Pamenar	YES	YES	YES						Short Film
2010	Tehran, Tehran	Tehran, Tehran						YES			
2007	Magician	Jadougar	YES	YES	YES						Documentary
2007	Parkway	Parkway					YES				
2007	The Music Man	Santouri					YES				
2006	Being a Star	Setareh Misahavad					YES				
2006	Persian Carpet	Farsh-e Irani					YES				Documentary, the segment: 'The Carpet and the Angel'.
2005	Salad-e Fasl	Salad-e Fasl					YES				
2004	Stars 3: Was a Star	Setareh Bood					YES				
2003	Meeting the Parrot	Molaghat ba Tooti					YES				
