= Badger (disambiguation) =

A badger is a short-legged, digging animal.

Badger or The Badger(s) may also refer to:

== Arts and entertainment ==
=== Fictional characters ===
- Badger (comics), a superhero created in 1983
- Badger, in 1908 novel The Wind in the Willows
- Badger Beadon, in 1936 detective story Why Didn't They Ask Evans?
- Bill Badger, in 1960 novel Bill Badger and the Pirates
- Badger, in 1979 novel The Animals of Farthing Wood
- Badger Myer, in 1985 film Better Off Dead
- Badger Lords, in the Redwall fantasy novel series (1986–2011)
- Badger, a puppet in TV programme Bodger & Badger (1989–1999)
- Badger, in TV series Monarch of the Glen (2000–2005)
- Badger, in the 2002 Firefly TV series
- Badger, in TV series Breaking Bad (2008–2013)

=== Works ===
- Badgers (animation) or Badger Badger Badger, a 2003 animated meme
- The Badger (newspaper), of the University of Sussex since 1965
- Badger (TV series), a 1999 British series
- Badger Books, a British paperback imprint (1960–1967)
- Badger, a 2001 EP by The Figgs
- "The Badger", a 2018 episode of Ozark

=== Other uses in arts and entertainment ===
- Badger (band), a 1970s British rock band

== People and roles ==
- Badger (surname), including a list of people with the name
- Badger (occupation), a food dealer in early Modern Britain
- Bernard Hinault (born 1954), French cyclist nicknamed The Badger
- Dorgon (lit. 'Badger') (1612–1650), Manchu prince and regent of the Qing dynasty
- Vadym Sukharevsky (born 1984), Ukrainian military officer, callsign Badger
- Badger, a youth volunteer for St John Ambulance

== Places ==
=== Australia ===
- Badger Island, Tasmania
- Little Badger Island, Tasmania

=== United States ===
- Badger, Alaska
- Badger, California
- Badger Hill, California
- Badger, Iowa
- Badger, Minnesota
- Badger, South Dakota
- Badger, Washington
- Badger, Wisconsin
- Badger Valley, a valley in Wisconsin
- Badger's Island, Kittery, Maine
- Wisconsin, "The Badger State"

=== Elsewhere ===
- Badger, Newfoundland and Labrador, Canada
- Badger, Shropshire, England

== Sport ==
- Brock Badgers, teams of Brock University, Canada
- Wisconsin Badgers, teams of the University of Wisconsin–Madison, United States
  - Bucky Badger, their mascot

== Transport and the military ==
=== Businesses ===
- Badger (automobile company), a car company in Wisconsin 1910–1911
- Badgerline, a bus company in Bristol, England

=== Land vehicles ===
- Badger IFV, a South African infantry fighting vehicle
- Nikola Badger, a cancelled proposed electric pickup truck
- Badger Bus, a service in Wisconsin, United States
- British Rail Class 89, nicknamed Badger
- Badger, a Chicago-Milwaukee Amtrak train now served by Hiawatha
- Badger, an armoured engineering vehicle derivative of the Leopard 1

=== Ships ===
- SS Badger, a Lake Michigan ferry
- USS William Badger, an American Civil War Union supply ship
- Badger (1775 ship), an English slave ship
- Badger (1803 ship), a hired armed cutter serving the Royal Navy
- HMS Badger, several British ships

=== Other military uses ===
- Tupolev Tu-16 (NATO codename: Badger), a Soviet twin-engine jet bomber
- Badger, a 1953 American nuclear test within Operation Upshot–Knothole

== Other uses ==
- Badger, to question argumentatively in court
- Badger Beers, brewed by Hall & Woodhouse
- MMH-Badger MAC, a message authentication code

== See also ==
- Badgered, a 2005 animated short film
- Bâdgir, an Iranian windcatcher
- Badger game, an extortion scheme
