= Amir Aghaei =

Iranian actor

- امیر آقایی
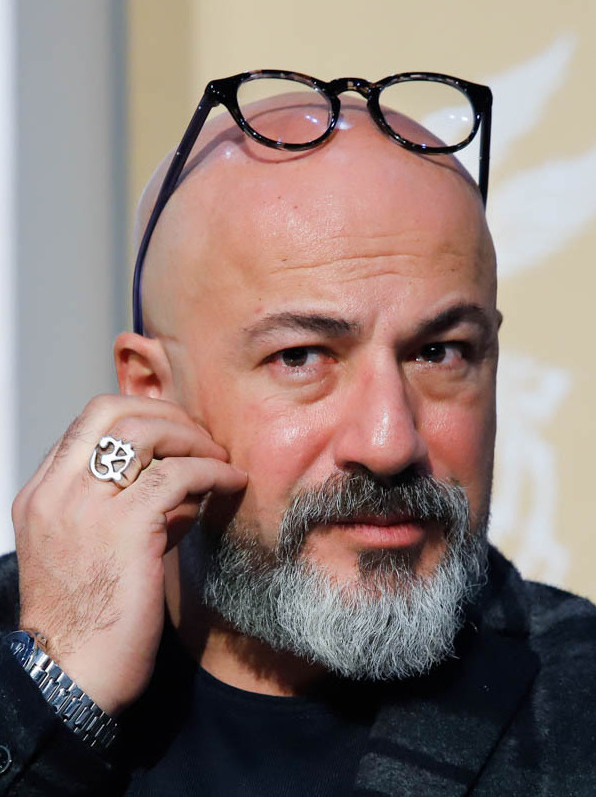
- Aghaei at the 2020 Fajr Film Festival
- Born: August 1, 1970 (age 55); Urmia, Iran
- Occupations: Actor; author; photographer
- Years active: 2001–present

Amir Aghaei (Persian: امیر آقایی; born August 1, 1980) is an Iranian actor and author.

== Career ==
Amir Aghaei made his cinematic debut by performing in Ebrahim Hatami-Kia's ‘Low Heights’ (2001).

Among his movies are ‘The Second Woman’ (2007), ‘Elixir and Dust’ (2008), ‘Hell, Purgatory, Heaven’ (2008), ‘Death is My Trade’ (2010), ‘Sa'adat Abad’ (2010), ‘Hush! Girls Don't Scream’ (2012), ‘Wednesday, 9 May’ (2014) and ‘Mermaid’ (2015).

Aghaei has also performed in a number of series including ‘The Gift of Darkness’ (2010), ‘The First Night of Peace’ (2005), ‘The Innocents’ (2008), ‘The Red Soil’ (2000) and ‘Remembrance’ (2013). He is also interested in painting, photography and poetry. He has exhibited his works in a number of galleries and published a book of poetry titled 'Willows in the Wind' (2010).

== Filmography ==
=== Film ===
Year	Title	Role	Director	Notes	Ref(s)
2002	Low Heights	Hassan	Ebrahim Hatamikia		
2007	The Other Wife		Sirus Alvand		
2008	The Last Role		Reza Ziaee Doostan		
2008	Elixir and Dust	Reza	Abbas Rafei		
2008	Niloofar	Sheik Abbas	Sabine El Gemayel		
2009	Hell, Purgatory, Paradise		Bijan Mirbagheri		
2011	Felicity Land	Ali	Maziar Miri		
2011	Death Is My Profession		Amir Hossein Saghafi		
2012	Private Life		Hossein Farahbakhsh		
2013	Hush! Girls Don't Scream	Asal's father	Pouran Derakhshandeh		
2013	A Cradle for the Mother	Mostafa	Panahbarkhoda Rezaee		
2013	We're All Sinners	Farhad	Hassan Nazer		
2015	Wednesday, May 9	Jalal	Vahid Jalilvand		
2015	The Nameless Alley	Babak	Hatef Alimardani		
2015	Night Shift	Rahim	Niki Karimi		
2015	360 Degree		Sam Gharibian		
2016	Bodyguard	Mr. Ashrafi	Ebrahim Hatamikia		
2016	Mermaid		Amir Masoud Aghababaian		
2017	Season of Nages	Reza Farjam	Negar Azarbaijani		
2017	No Date, No Signature	Dr. Kaveh Nariman	Vahid Jalilvand		
2017	Privacy	Babak	Ahmad Moazemi		
2017	Lina	Uncle	Ramin Rasouli		
2019	A Man Without a Shadow	Foad Dashtara	Alireza Raisian		
2019	Russian	Toumaj	Amir Hossein Saghafi		
2020	Drown	Hashem	Mohammad Kart		
2021	The Four Walls		Bahman Ghobadi		
2022	Killing a Traitor	Mehdi Baligh	Masoud Kimiai		
2022	Motherless	Amirali	Morteza Fatemi		
2022	Beyond the Wall		Vahid Jalilvand		
2024	When You Were Not Here		Kaveh Sajjadi Hosseini		
TBA	Nightcrawler		Farzad Motamen		
TBA	Line of Rescue		Vahid Mousaian		
TBA	1542		Hadi Rahimi		

=== Web ===
Year	Title	Role	Director	Platform	Ref(s)
2012	Icy Heart 3	Atila	Saman Moghaddam	Video CD	
2017	The Excellency	Esfandiar Parham	Sam Gharibian	Video CD	
2019	Dance on the Glass	Edris Malek	Mehdi Golestaneh	Video CD	
2020–2021	Blue Blood	Nima Bahri	Behrang Tofighi	Filimo, Namava	
2022	Cold Blooded		Amir Hossein Torabi	Filmnet	
2023–2024	Fereshteh's Sin	Navid Ashiri	Hamed Angha	Filimo	

=== Television ===
- Ferris wheel (2016)
- The Recall (TV series) (2011)
- Lotus (2008)
- The day arises (2006)
- The passed way (2005)
