= Mehdi Hosseininia =

Iranian actor (born 1981)

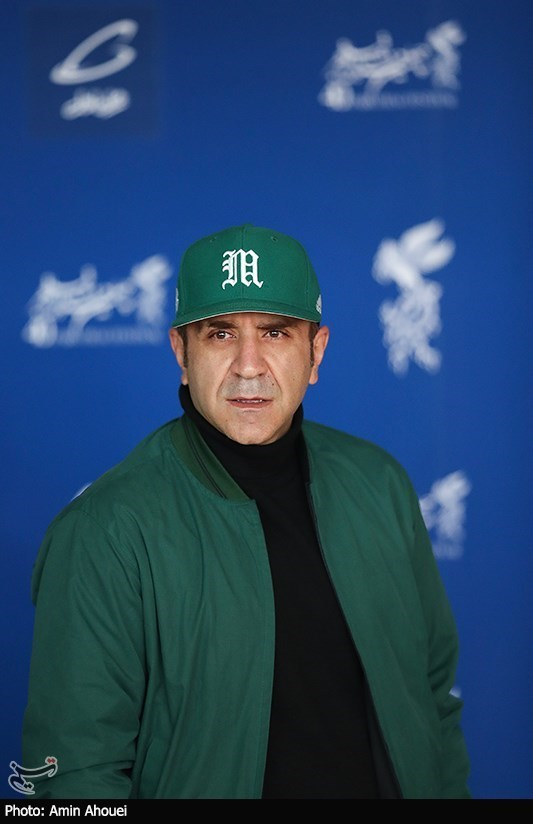
- Hosseininia at the 40th Fajr International Film Festival in 2022
- Born: 19 September 1981 (age 44); Tehran, Iran
- Occupation: Actor
- Years active: 2011–present

Mehdi Hosseininia (Persian: مهدی حسینی‌نیا; born 19 September 1981) is an Iranian actor. He made his feature film debut in Here Without Me (2011). He is best known for his supporting performances in Just 6.5, Drown, Leila's Brothers, and the web series The Rebel.

== Filmography ==
=== Film ===
Year	Title	Role	Director	Notes
2011	Here Without Me		Bahram Tavakoli	
2012	I'm His Wife		Mostafa Shayesteh	
2013	No Where, No Body		Ebrahim Sheibani	
2014	The Story of Mary's Disappearance		Mohammadreza Lotfi	
2016	Nobody Dies Here	Oil thief	Hossein Kondori	
2016	50 Kilos of Sour Cherries		Mani Haghighi	
2016	Drought and Lies	Police officer	Pedram Alizadeh	
2017	Chanel	Hamoun	Hossein Kondori	
2017	The Atmosphere Station	Warehouse manager	Mehdi Jafari	
2017	The Night of Turning 18		Hamed Tehrani	
2019	African Violet	Ghasem	Mona Zandi Haghighi	
2019	We Are All Together	Passenger	Kamal Tabrizi	
2019	Law of Tehran	Hassan Gavi	Saeed Roustaee	
2020	Drown	Mosayeb	Mohammad Kart	
2020	The Badger	Rouzbeh	Kazem Mollaie	
2020	Killer Spider	Taxi driver	Ebrahim Irajzad	
2021	Bright House		Rouhollah Hejazi	
2021	Expediency	Lashkari	Hossein Darabi	
2021	Squad of Girls	Vajiheh's husband	Monir Ghaedi	
2021	The Sixth Day	Shafie'	Hojat Ghasemzadeh Asl	
2022	Leila's Brothers	Bayram	Saeed Roustaee	
2024	Maybe Somewhere Else		Ali Tasdighi	
2024	Hard Shell	Kianoush	Majidreza Mostafavi	
2024	Alligator Blood	Mehdi	Javad Ezzati	
2024	Seventy Thirty	Siavash	Bahram Afshari	

=== Television ===
Year	Title	Role	Director	Network
2015	Pardeh Neshin		Behrouz Shoaibi	IRIB TV1
2018	Twilight		Homayoun Asadian	IRIB TV3

=== Web series ===
Year	Title	Role	Director	Platform
2017	The Grand	Minister of Finance	Sam Gharibian	Video CD
2021	Siavash	Vahid	Soroush Mohammadzadeh	Namava
2021	I Want to Live	Meftah	Shahram Shahhosseini	Filimo
2022	Red Square	Mansour	Ebrahim Ebrahimian	Filimo
2022	The Rebel	Rahman	Mohammad Kart	Filimo
2022	Set Me Free	Bahram	Shahram Shahhosseini	Filimo
2023	The Lost Prestige	Amir Aghabeigi	Sajjad Pahlevanzadeh	Filimo
2024	The Beheading	Bahman Matin	Saman Salour	Filmnet
2024	The Estrangement	Farhad Salarzadeh	Amir Pourkian	Namava
2025	Hunting Ground	Bahador	Nima Javidi	Filimo
2025	Beretta: The Story of a Gun	Amirali Naddaf	Amirhossein Torabi	Filmnet
2026	Polka Dot	Iraj	Ebrahim Irajzad	Sheyda
2026	Twenty One	Major Majd	Behnam Behzadi	Sheyda
