= Tannaz Tabatabaei =

Iranian actress (born 1984)

- طناز طباطبایی
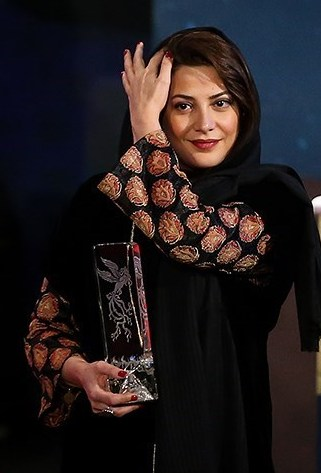
- Tabatabaei at the 2020 Fajr Film Festival
- Born: May 10, 1984 (age 42); Tehran, Iran
- Education: Islamic Azad University, Central Tehran Branch
- Occupation: Actress
- Years active: 2000–present

Tannaz Tabatabaei (Persian: طناز طباطبایی; born May 10, 1984) is an Iranian actress. She has received various accolades, including two Crystal Simorgh for her performances in Drown (2020) and Without Her (2022) and two Iran's Film Critics and Writers Association Awards for The Voices (2009) and Villa Dwellers (2017). Tabatabaei earned three Hafez Award nominations for her roles in Drown, Rebel, and Without Her.

== Early life ==
She has been active since 2000 acting in Cinema, TV-Series, and Theatre and started her occupation by passing Hiva-Film acting free classes she has chosen Zabih after a month but her first role as an actress in cinema was Aida, I Saw Your Dad Last Night by Rasul Sadr Ameli.

Tannaz shows her abilities by acting in Mive Mamnoue which was one of the main roles and she completed it in the best way for her role in Marham.

In 2009, she won an award for best supporting actress for her role as Negar in Sadaha.

In 2010, she presented for acting in two banned screening movies, Gozaresh yek jashn directed by Ebrahim Hatamikia and Parinaz directed by Bahram Bahramian.

In 2017, she won the award for best supporting actress for her role as Sima in Vilaeiha at the 11th Critics' Choice movie award for Best Iranian film.

She has also worked in music and painting except cinema.

== Filmography ==
=== Film ===
Year	Title	Role	Director	Notes	Ref(s)
2004	Aida, I Saw Your Father Last Night	Tannaz	Rasul Sadr Ameli		
2007	The Music Box	Miss Sa'adati	Farzad Motamen		
2007	Four Finger	Marjan	Saeed Soheili		
2007	Benighted	Maryam	Farzad Motamen		
2008	Tehrani Boy	Leili Bidel	Kazem Rastgoftar		
2008	Voices	Negar	Farzad Motamen	Nominated – Crystal Simorgh Fajr Film Festival Award for Best Supporting Actress Won – Iran's Film Critics and Writers Association Award for Best Supporting Actress	
2008	Shirin	Herself	Abbas Kiarostami		
2009	Mizak	Setareh	Hossein Ali Layalestani		
2009	Tehran Tehran	Niloofar	Mehdi Karampour		
2010	Salve	Maryam	Alireza Davood Nejad	Won – Iran's Film Critics and Writers Association Diploma Honorary for Best Actress	
2010	Devoted	Gandom	Bahman Goudarzi		
2010	The Report of a Celebration	Herself	Ebrahim Hatamikia		
2011	Orange Suit	Herself	Dariush Mehrjui		
2012	The 7th	Nazanin	Masoud Gharagozlo	Short film	
2013	Hush! Girls Don't Scream	Shirin	Pouran Derakhshandeh	Nominated – Hafez Award for Best Actress Motion Picture	
2013	The Last 50 Steps	Havzhin	Kiumars Pourahmad		
2014	Resident of the Middle Floor		Shahab Hosseini		
2014	Hard Makeup	Ladan	Hamid Nematollah		
2015	Crazy Rook	Mandana	Abolhassan Davoudi	Nominated – Crystal Simorgh Fajr Film Festival Award for Best Actress	
2015	Death of the Fish	Farideh	Rohollah Hejazi		
2015	Twenty Weeks	Dr. Bahrami	Masoud Gharagozloo		
2016	Arvand	Leila	Pouriya Azarbaijani		
2016	Sound and Fury	Hana Sarafraz	Houman Seyyedi	Nominated – Crystal Simorgh Fajr Film Festival Award for Best Actress	
2016	Delighted	Bahar	Abdolreza Kahani	Unreleased film	
2017	Villa Dwellers	Sima	Monir Gheidi	Won – Iran's Film Critics and Writers Association Award for Best Supporting Actress	
2017	Fairy Out of Wedluck	Hakimeh	Bahram Bahramian		
2018	Millionaire of Miami	Mahsa	Mostafa Ahmadi		
2019	Tala	Leila	Parviz Shahbazi		
2019	Russian	Marjan	Amir Hossein Saghafi		
2020	Drown	Parvaneh	Mohammad Kart	Won – Crystal Simorgh Fajr Film Festival Award for Best Supporting Actress Nominated – Iran's Film Critics and Writers Association Award for Best Supporting Actress	
2020	Sun Children	Ali's mother	Majid Majidi	Cameo	
2022	Without Her	Roya	Arin Vazirdaftari	Won – Crystal Simorgh Fajr Film Festival Award for Best Actress	

=== Television ===
Year	Title	Role	Director	Notes	Network	Ref(s)
2000	The Sacrifice	Aminah	Abbas Moradiyan	TV series		
2001	Youth		Saeed Soltani	TV series		
2007	Pecker	Pegah	Farzad Motamen	TV film	IRIB TV1	
2007	The Forbidden Fruit	Ghazaleh Fotouhi	Hassan Fathi	TV series	IRIB TV2	
2009–2010	In the Eye of the Wind	Farangis	Masoud Jafari Jozani	TV series	IRIB TV1	
2009	Open Parenthesis	Niki Golshahr	Kiumars Pourahmad	TV series, Nominated – Hafez Award for Best Actress Television Series Comedy		
2013	The Red Hat	Herself	Iraj Tahmasb	TV program		

=== Web ===
Year	Title	Role	Director	Platform	Ref(s)
2011	Frozen Heart	Shiva Ghaem Maghami	Mohammad Hosein Latifi		
2013	King of Ear	Gandom Shoja'at	Davood Mir Bagheri		
2022	Rebel	Tala Motallaee	Mohammad Kart	Filimo	
TBA	Brave		Jamshid Mahmoudi	Filmnet	

== Theatre ==
Year	Title	Director
2010	Lesson	Dariush Mehrjui
2010	A Little Higher	Arvand Dashtarai
2011	Tin Tin: The Secret of Mondas Castle	Arvand Dashtarai
2012	The Gardener of Death	Arvand Dashtarai
2016–2017	Love Letters from the Middle East	Kioumars Moradi
2018	Trauma	Afsaneh Mahian
2019	Crime and Punishment	Reza Servati
2022	300	Amir Jadidi
