= Ali Shadman =

Iranian actor (born 1996)

- علی شادمان
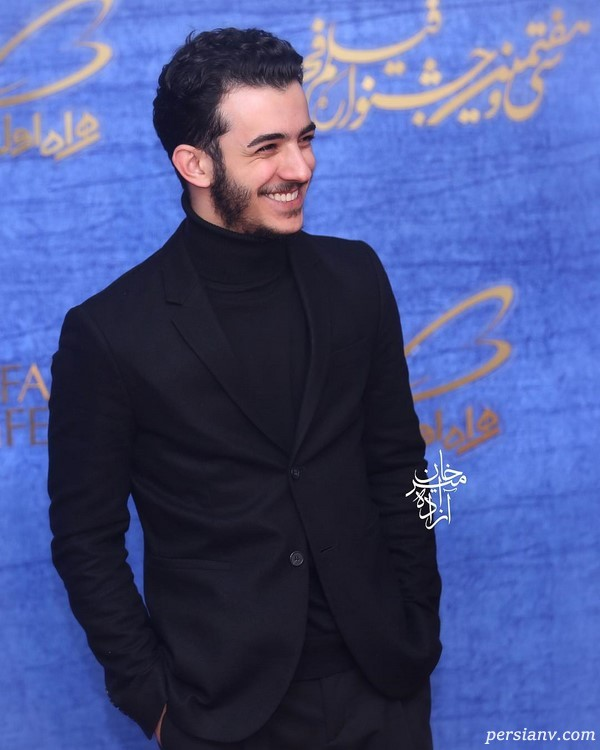
- Shadman at the 2019 Fajr Film Festival
- Born: Mohammad Ali Shadman; 24 November 1996 (age 29); Ilam, Iran
- Occupation: Actor
- Years active: 2006–present

Mohammad Ali Shadman (Persian: علی شادمان, born 24 November 1996) is an Iranian actor. He is best known for his acting in M for Mother (2006) that was selected as the Iranian entry for the Best Foreign Language Film at the 80th Academy Awards, but it was not nominated. He is also known for Divar Be Divar (2017–2018), Drown (2020), I Want to Live (2021) and Rebel (2022). Shadman earned a Crystal Simorgh for Best Actor nomination for his performance in Drowning in Holy Water.

== Early life ==
Mohammad Ali Shadman was born on 24 November 1996 in Ilam, Iran. He has a sister named Arina and is the first child in the family. He is of Kurdish origin.

== Career ==
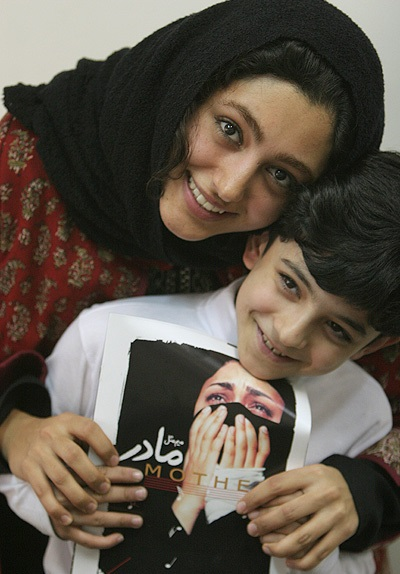
Ali Shadman and Golshifteh Farahani in press conference of M for Mother (2006).

He was first introduced to Iranian cinema by Rasoul Mollagholipour and Mohammad Reza Balali, his best friend in the film M for Mother, because of his ability to play the violin.

== Filmography ==
=== Film ===
Year	Title	Role	Director	Notes
2006	M for Mother	Saeed	Rasoul Mollagholipour	
2008	A Time to Love	Babak	Ebrahim Forouzesh	
2008	Miss Iran	Ali	Saman Moghaddam	Released in 2026
2009	Non-profit Police Station	Majid	Yadollah Samadi	
2012	Cinema Dream	Kazem	Ali Shah Hatami, Hamid Shah Hatami	
2014	Resident of the Middle Floor		Shahab Hosseini	
2016	The Orphanage	Hesam	Abolqasem Talebi	
2016	Arvand	Ebrahim	Pourya Azarbayjani	
2017	Villa Dwellers	Elias	Monir Gheidi	
2019	Alive	Vahid	Hossein Amiri Doumari, Pedram Pouramiri	
2019	Hotel New Moon	Sahand	Takefumi Tsutsui	
2019	We Are All Together	Mohsen	Kamal Tabrizi	
2020	Sheen	Sina	Meisam Kazazi	
2020	Drown	Ashkan	Mohammad Kart	
2020	Drowning in Holy Water	Sohrab	Navid Mahmoudi	
2024	Summer Time	Davoud	Mahmoud Kalari	
2025	Tehran Another View	Pasha	Ali Behrad	

=== Web ===
Year	Title	Role	Director	Platform
2021	I Want to Live	Kaveh Haghi	Shahram Shah Hosseini	Filimo
2022	Rebel	Javid Ganji	Mohammad Kart	Filimo
2025	One Way Ticket		Pouria Heidary Oureh	Namava
2026	The Red and the Black		Ida Panahandeh	Filimo

=== Television ===
Year	Title	Role	Director	Network	Notes
2015–2016	Kimia	Kayvan Parsa	Javad Afshar	IRIB TV2	TV series
2016–2017	Moon and Leopard	Soheil Naeemi	Ahmad Amini	IRIB TV3	TV series
2017	The Convicts	Soheil	Seyyed Jamal Seyyed Hatami	IRIB TV1	TV series
2017–2018	Divar Be Divar	Arman Khalil Zadeh	Saman Moghaddam	IRIB TV3	TV series
2023	Homeland	Rahi Bahadori	Kamal Tabrizi	IRIB TV3	TV series

== Awards and nominations ==
Award	Year	Category	Nominated Work	Result	Ref.
Fajr Film Festival	2020	Best Actor in a Leading Role	Drowning in Holy Water	Nominated	
Fajr Film Festival	2024	Best Actor in a Leading Role	Summer Time	Nominated	
Hafez Awards	2021	Best Actor – Television Series Drama	I Want to Live	Nominated	
Hafez Awards	2023	Best Actor – Television Series Drama	Rebel	Nominated	
Hafez Awards	2024	Best Actor – Television Series Drama	Homeland	Nominated	
International Film Festival for Children and Youth Awards	2009	Best Actor	A Time to Love	Won	
International Film Festival for Children and Youth Awards	2012	Best Actor	Cinema Dream	Won	
Iran Cinema Celebration	2008	Best Actor in a Leading Role	A Time to Love	Nominated	
Roshd International Film Festival	2007	Best Child Actor	M for Mother	Won	
