= Beyond the Wall (2022 film) =

- Film poster
- Persian: شب، داخلی، دیوار
- Directed by: Vahid Jalilvand
- Written by: Vahid Jalilvand
- Produced by: Ali Jalilvand
- Starring: Navid Mohammadzadeh; Diana Habibi; Amir Aghaei; Alireza Kamali; Saeed Dakh; Danial Kheirikhah
- Production company: Mehr Taha Studio
- Distributed by: The Match Factory
- Release date: 8 September 2022 (Venice)
- Running time: 126 minutes
- Country: Iran
- Language: Persian

Beyond the Wall (Persian: شب، داخلی، دیوار, romanized: Shab, Dakheli, Divar, lit. 'Night, Interior, Wall') is a 2022 Iranian drama film written and directed by Vahid Jalilvand, and produced by Ali Jalilvand. The film stars Navid Mohammadzadeh, Diana Habibi and Amir Aghaei. Beyond the Wall had its world premiere at the 79th Venice International Film Festival on 8 September 2022.

== Premise ==
A blind man named Ali attempts suicide, but is interrupted by his building concierge; he then tells Ali about an escaped woman, named Leila, who is hidden in the building. Ali becomes determined to help Leila.

== Cast ==
- Navid Mohammadzadeh as Ali
- Diana Habibi as Leila
- Amir Aghaei
- Alireza Kamali
- Saeed Dakh
- Danial Kheirikhah

== Production ==
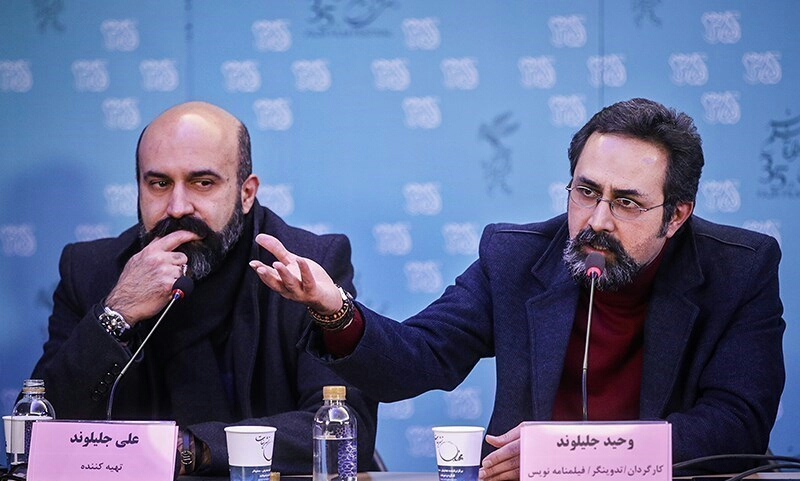
Vahid Jalilvand (right) and his brother Ali Jalilvand (left)

The film is written and directed by Vahid Jalilvand, and produced by his brother Ali Jalilvand, starring Navid Mohammadzadeh and Amir Aghaei, who have worked together with Jalilvand in his previous film No Date, No Signature.

The film is said to have taken at least two years to make, and filming was halted after Mohammadzadeh, the lead actor, contracted COVID-19.

== Release ==
Beyond the Wall had its world premiere in-competition at the 79th Venice International Film Festival for the Golden Lion, on 8 September 2022.

Similar to Leila's Brothers by Saeed Roustayi at the 2022 Cannes Film Festival starring Navid Mohammadzadeh, Beyond The Wall has not received permission from the Iranian authorities.

German company, The Match Factory, secured the film's international rights in July 2022.

== Reception ==
=== Accolades ===
Beyond the Wall was selected to compete for Golden Lion at the 79th Venice International Film Festival, along with No Bears by Jafar Panahi as Iran's only entries for the main competition.

Award	Date of ceremony	Category	Recipient(s)	Result	Ref(s)
Venice International Film Festival	31 August – 10 September 2022	Golden Lion	Vahid Jalilvand	Nominated	
Asia Pacific Screen Awards	11 November 2022	Best Screenplay	Vahid Jalilvand	Nominated	
Asia Pacific Screen Awards	11 November 2022	Best Performance	Navid Mohammadzadeh	Nominated	
International Film Festival and Forum on Human Rights	10 — 19 March, 2023	Fiction Grand Award	Beyond the Wall	Won	
