= Rebel (Iranian TV series) =

Iranian TV series

- Persian: یاغی
- Genre: Drama; Life drama; Romance
- Written by: Pedram Pour-Amiri; Hossein Doumari; Mohammad Kart
- Directed by: Mohammad Kart
- Starring: Parsa Pirouzfar; Ali Shadman; Tannaz Tabatabaei; Amir Jafari; Niki Karimi; Farhad Aslani; Mehdi Hosseini-nia; Aban Askari; Mahlagha Bagheri; Abbas Jamshidifar; Javad Khajavi; Elika Naseri
- Composer: Bamdad Afshar
- Country of origin: Iran
- Original language: Persian
- No. of seasons: 1
- No. of episodes: 20

Production
- Producer: Maziar Hashemi
- Production locations: Tehran; Mazandaran
- Editor: Esmaeil Alizadeh
- Running time: 1st Episode :100 minutes Other Episodes: 60 minutes

Original release
- Network: Home video
- Release: 19 May – 22 September 2022

Rebel (Persian: یاغی, romanized: yāği) is an Iranian Home series in the drama genre that has been made for Filimo's home Show service in 20 episodes. Mohammad Kart is the director of this series and its screenplay is written by Pedram Pouramiri, Hossein Doumari and Kart based on the novel Salto. The main actors of this series are Parsa Pirouzfar, Ali Shadman, Tannaz Tabatabaei, Amir Jafari, Niki Karimi, Farhad Aslani, Mehdi Hosseininia, Aban Askari, Mahlagha Bagheri, Abbas Jamshidifar, Javad Khajavi and Elika Naseri. Yaghi premiered on May 29, 1401, and ended on September 31, consisting of 20 episode. this series were well received by critics and audiences.

== Storyline ==
Javid (Ali Shadman) is a teenager from the lower neighborhoods of Tehran who, based on what has happened in his life, has not yet been able to have an identity card and is tired of all the hardships he has endured in his life And to be able to start a good and dignified life and marry a girl named Abra (Elika Naseri), who are interested in each other; He is looking for a way to provide evidence to the judge of requesting his identity card to prove his claim, that the late Mahmoud Ganji is his father. But for do this he has no choice but to undergo genetic testing, and to do so he needs to satisfy his paternal family, who refuse to do so. But in this way, he encounters problems and events.

== Cast ==
Actor	Character	Description
Ali Shadman	Javid	Abra's boyfriend
Parsa Pirouzfar	Bahman	A rich and influential person in wrestling who owns a wrestling club.
Tannaz Tabatabaei	"Tala" Motallaei	Bahman' Wife
Amir Jafari	"Esmaeil" Ghowanlu (Nicknamed "Esi the Piggy bank")	The Fence and gambler with whom Javid works. He hold soil wrestlings in the neighborhood.
Niki Karimi	Shima	Bahman's last wife
Farhad Aslani	"Akbar" Mojallal	
Aban Askari	"Atefe" Ghanbarzadeh	Javid's step sister
Abbas Jamshidifar	"Mr. Ali" Gorgin	Esmaeil Ghowanlu's partner that has an addiction treatment center and involved in soil wrestling betting.
Elika Naseri	Abra	Javid's Girlfriend
Mahlagha Bagheri	Narges	Abra's Mother
Nahid Moslemi	Mrs. Ganji	Javid's Aunt
Mehdi Hosseini-nia	Rahman	Bahman's brother
Amir Reza Delavari		
Javad Khajavi	Hamed	Singer of a street band
Nader Shahsavari	Seyyed	
Saman Mahkouyeh	Reza (Niknamed Reza the sludge)	Javid's buddy
Afshin Hassanlou	Lali	Javid's buddy
Towfigh Heidari	Saeid (Niknamed Saeid the wirepuller)	Javid's buddy

== Release ==
The first episode of Rebel was shown on 19 May 2022, through the Filimo service, and the next episodes will be shown weekly every Thursday at 8:00 AM.

== Reception ==
=== Reviews ===
Rebel has received positive reviews from critics and audiences. Vajihe Amirkhani from Hamshahri Online, in reviewing the first part of this series, praised the melody, the performance of the actors and its characterization. In his review of the first two episodes, Farbad Mateen from Zumji praised the acting of the actors and the story-telling process, but criticized some of the dialogues and long scenes of the series. He considered the depiction of "lot people and thugs" to be the style of Mohammad Kart's direction, which can be seen in his previous works. A critic in IRNA considered "its unpredictability" to be the strong point of the series and added that "the complex script of the series constantly attacks its audience and takes them to a path that they did not think of. Farid Mateen from Zumji website praised the acting of the actors and the storytelling process in his review of the first two episodes, but criticized some of the dialogues and long scenes of the series. He considered the portrayal of "lots of people and thugs" to be the style of Mohammad Kart's direction, which can be seen in his previous works. A critic in IRNA considered "its unpredictability" to be the strong point of the series and added, "the complex script of the series constantly abuses its audience. And it takes him to a path that he did not think of.

Film and TV critic Golbo Fayouzi criticized the change of the outlaw genre and added that the series "gives the wrong address and everything proceeds naively and with the least possible trust in the audience's intelligence.
