= Ali Jalilvand =

Iranian engineer

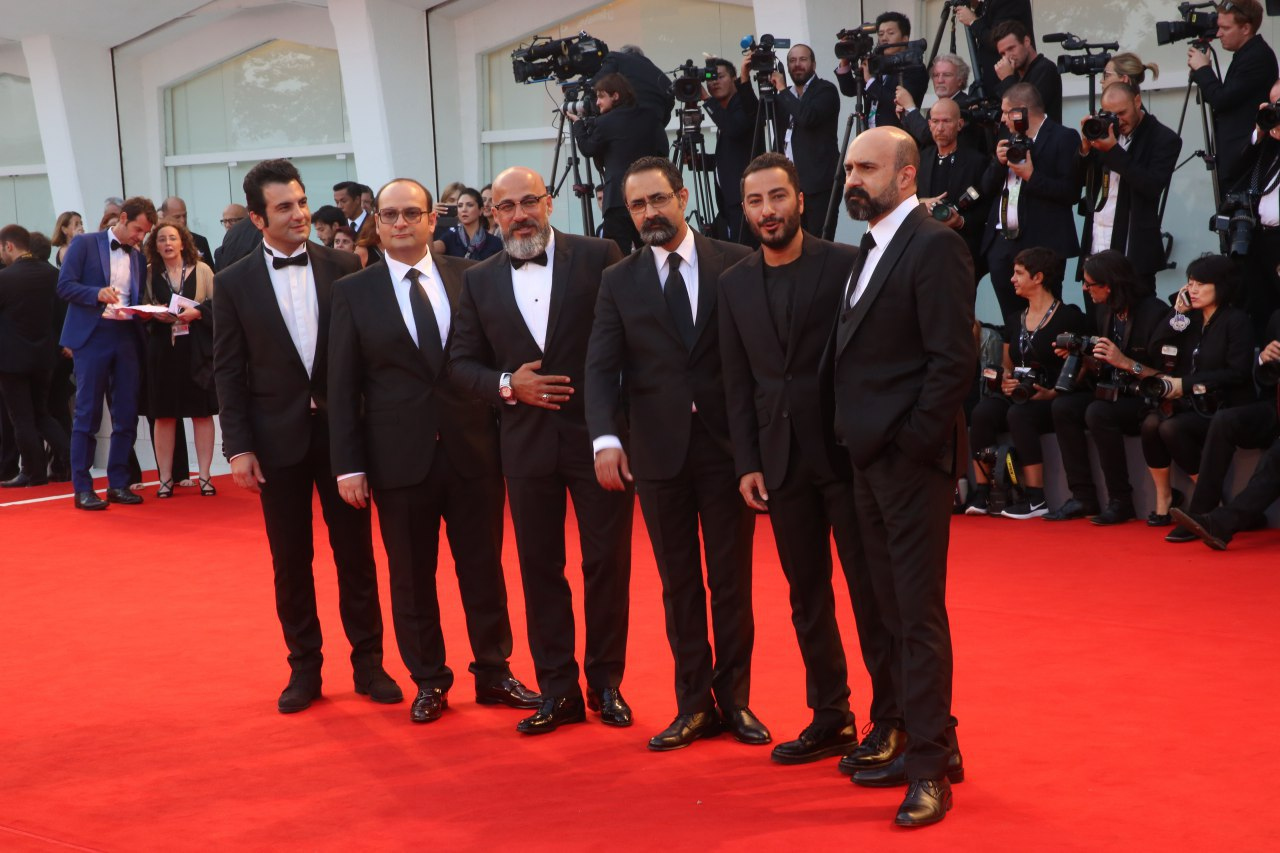
Red Carpet for film "No Date, No Signature"

Ali Jalilvand was born in Tehran in 1973, and he is a civil engineering graduate from Tehran Azad University.

He began his career as programmer and then production manager in Iranian television in 1989. He began producing in the cinema and television officially after 5 years, and he is now a member of Film Producers Guild of Iran as a professional producer. He has produced more than 35 feature films, documentary films, series, documentary series, and theatres since 1995.

== Filmography ==
- Production of more than 20 documentary and fiction series in television
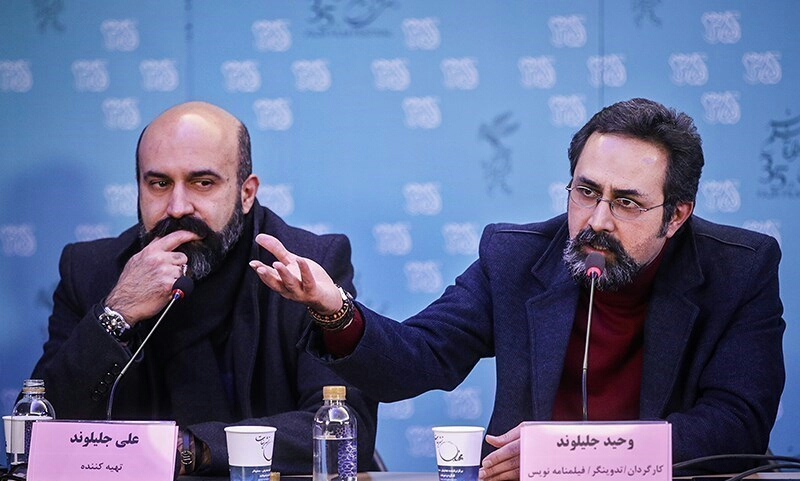
- Fajr Film Festival
  Production of 9 short fiction films:
- Three Generations in Mellat Beauty Salon, 1996
- Rosary of Love, 1997
- Dawn, 2000
- Mani, 2003
- Glasses, 2004
- Our Good Village, 2005
- Behind My Back, 2006
- Two Facing People, 2007
- Transcendence, 2009
- Production 'Border Zero", documentary by Mehdi Afsharnik, 2019
- Production
- Production of three feature films
- Wednesday, May 9 by Vahid Jalilvand, 2015
- No Date, No Signature by Vahid Jalilvand, 2017
- "Below Border Zero", documentary by Mehdi Afsharnik, 2019
