= Abbas Jamshidifar =

Iranian actor (born 1980)

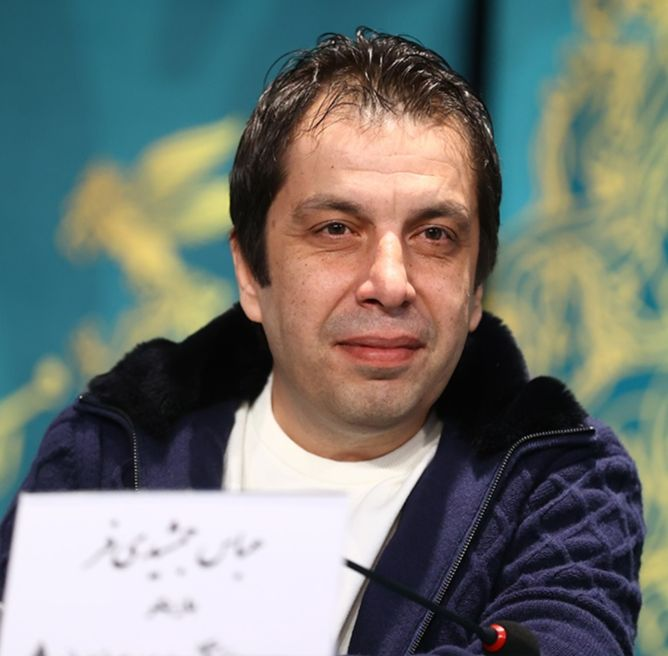
- Jamshidifar at the 2024 Fajr International Film Festival
- Born: September 8, 1980 (age 45); Kermanshah, Iran
- Occupation: Actor
- Years active: 2000–present
- Spouse: Mahdokht Mousavian (m. 2023)

Abbas Jamshidifar (Persian: عباس جمشیدی‌فر; born September 8, 1980) is an Iranian actor. He is best known for his roles in Happy Times of Mr. Habib (2007), 50-50 of a Shop (2011), and Mortal Wound (2021). Jamshidifar has received various accolades, including a Fajr Theatre Festival Award, in addition to nominations for two Hafez Awards and an Iran's Film Critics and Writers Association Award.

== Filmography ==
=== Film ===
Year	Title	Role	Director	Notes	Ref(s)
2008	The Wall		Mohammad Ali Talebi		
2009	Fighter Rooster	Gholamrezaee	Masoud Atyabi		
2018	Silent Voices		Sahabanoo Zolghadr		
2018	The Redtails	Guardian	Arash Moayerian		
2019	Tornado		Javad Hashemi		
2019	Under the Supervision		Majid Salehi		
2021	Shishlik		Mohammad Hossein Mahdavian		
2022	How Much You Want to Cry? 2		Ali Tavakolnia		
2022	Space Island: Tornado 2		Javad Hashemi		
2023	Leather Jacket Man	Pasha	Hossein Mirzamohammadi		
2024	Kianoush's Garden		Reza Keshavarz Haddad		
2024	Knight		Hossein Namazi		
2024	Alligator Blood	Peyman Pazouki	Javad Ezzati		
2024	Funnel		Mohsen Amiryoussefi		
2025	Saddam	Khashayar Moteajeb	Pedram Pouramiri		
2025	Dear Mother		Soheil Moafagh		

=== Web ===
Year	Title	Role	Director	Platform	Notes	Ref(s)
2019	Recovery	Keramat	Bahador Asadi	Namava	Supporting role	
2020	Tweezers		Hossein Tabrizi	Rubika, Tik	Main role	
2021–2025	Mortal Wound	Akhavan	Mohammad Hossein Mahdavian	Filimo	Recurring role	
2021–2022	Joker	Himself	Ehsan Alikhani, Hamed Mirfatahi	Filimo	Reality show	
2022	Rebel	Ali Gorgin	Mohammad Kart	Filimo	Supporting role	
2023	Secret Army	Himself	Saeed Aboutaleb	Filimo	Game show	
2023	TNT	Himself	Hamed Ahangi	Filimo	Talk show	
2023	The Fall	Ardalan	Sajad Pahlevanzadeh	Filimo	Supporting role	
2023	The Black Hole	Jandaghi	Hossein Namazi	Filmnet	Supporting role	
2024	The North Pole	Parviz	Amin Mahmoudi Yekta	Filimo	Supporting role	
2024	Dariush	Kazem	Hadi Hejazifar	Filmnet	Main role	
2025	A Delayed Death	Gholam	Adel Tabrizi	Filmnet	Main role; 20 episodes	

== Awards and nominations ==
Name of the award ceremony, year presented, category, nominee of the award, and the result of the nomination
Award	Year	Category	Nominated Work	Result	Ref(s)
Fajr Theatre Festival	2001	Best Actor	Thus I Gave Up	Won	
Fajr Theatre Festival	2004	Best Actor	Don Quixote	2nd runner-up	
Hafez Awards	2024	Best Actor – Television Series Drama	Dariush	Nominated	
Hafez Awards	2025	Best Actor – Television Series Comedy	A Delayed Death	Nominated	
Iran's Film Critics and Writers Association	2025	Best Actor in a Supporting Role	Alligator Blood	Nominated	
