= Wednesday, May 9 =

2015 film

- Film poster
- Directed by: Vahid Jalilvand
- Written by: Vahid Jalilvand
- Produced by: Ali Jalilvand
- Starring: Niki Karimi
- Cinematography: Morteza Pursamadi
- Edited by: Vahid Jalilvand
- Music by: Karen Homayounfar
- Release date: 7 September 2015 (Venice)
- Running time: 102 minutes
- Country: Iran
- Language: Persian

Wednesday, May 9 (Persian: Chaharshanbeh, 19 Ordibehesht) is a 2015 Iranian drama film directed by Vahid Jalilvand in his feature debut. It was shown in the Horizons section of the 72nd Venice International Film Festival where it won the FIPRESCI Award.

== Cast ==
- Niki Karimi
- Amir Aghaei
- Afarin Oveysi
- Shahrokh Forootanian
- Vahid Jalilvand
- Saeed Dakh
- Kataneh Afsharinezhad
- Sahar Ahmadpur
- Milad Yazdani
- Borzu Arjmand

== Reception ==
=== Critical response ===
On review aggregator website Rotten Tomatoes, the film holds an approval rating of 100% based on 7 reviews, and an average rating of 7.8/10.
