= Mim Mesle Madar =

M Like Mother
- Film poster
- Directed by: Rasoul Mollagholipour
- Written by: Rasoul Mollagholipour
- Produced by: Manouchehr Mohammadi
- Starring: Golshifteh Farahani Jamshid Hashempour Ali Shadman Hossein Yari Sahar Dolatshahi
- Cinematography: Shapour Pouramir
- Music by: Arya Aziminejad
- Release date: 2006
- Country: Iran
- Language: Persian

M for Mother (Persian: میم مثل مادر, romanized: Mim Mesle Madar) is a 2006 Iranian film. Directed by Rasoul Mollaqolipour, the film stars Ali Shadman, Golshifteh Farahani and Hossein Yari. it was selected as the Iranian entry for the Best Foreign Language Film at the 80th Academy Awards, but it was not nominated.

The film is among the highest box office records in the history of Iranian cinema. Acclaimed Iranian actress Golshifteh Farahani stars in this film. The film's score attained great acclaim, composed by Arya Aziminejad.

== See also ==
- Iranian cinema
