= HMS Orpheus (1780) =

Frigate of the Royal Navy

History

Great Britain
- Name: HMS Orpheus
- Ordered: 2 October 1778
- Builder: Adams & Barnard, Deptford
- Laid down: 7 July 1779
- Launched: 3 June 1780
- Completed: By 15 July 1780
- Fate: Wrecked on 23 January 1807

General characteristics
- Class & type: 32-gun fifth-rate Amazon-class frigate (1773) frigate
- Tons burthen: 68866/94 (bm)
- Length: 126 ft 4 in (38.5 m) (overall); 104 ft 8 in (31.9 m) (keel)
- Beam: 35 ft 2 1/4 in (10.7 m)
- Depth of hold: 12 ft (3.7 m)
- Sail plan: Full-rigged ship
- Complement: 220
- Armament: Upper deck: 26 × 12-pounder guns; QD: 4 × 6-pounder guns + 4 × 18-pounder carronades; Fc: 2 × 6-pounder guns + 2 × 18-pounder carronades

HMS Orpheus was a 32–gun fifth rate frigate of the Royal Navy. She was launched in 1780, and served for more than a quarter of a century, before she was wrecked in 1807.

== American War of Independence ==
On 14 April 1781, Orpheus and HMS Roebuck captured the USS Confederacy off the Delaware. The Royal Navy briefly took her into service as HMS Confederate.

In March 1782, Orpheus captured the American letter of marque Navarro. The Royal Navy took her into service as HMS Polecat.

== French Revolutionary Wars ==
1792 Orpheus sailed to the leeward Island under the command of Captain Henry Newcombe, 1793 sailed to the East Indies. On 5 May 1794, Orpheus captured the French frigate Duguay Trouin, the former East Indiaman Princess Royal, which the French had captured on 27 September 1793.

On 22 June 1796 Orpheus was in the Straits of Banca, where she captured the Dutch brig Harlingen. The British took Harlingen into service as HMS Amboyna.

In August 1797 Orpheus was reported as being in Madras and Captain William Hill was appointed commander.

On 7 May, 1800 she was anchored in the Sunda Strait.

== Napoleonic Wars ==
On 16 April 1806, Orpheus, Captain Thomas Briggs, was in company with the revenue cutter Badger. They shared in the proceeds of the capture of two merchant vessels, Vrou Fingina and Vyf Gesusters. (Note: Prize money was paid in June 1815. A first-class share was worth £77 0s 1d; a fifth-class share, that of a seaman, was worth 10s 1½d.)

== Fate ==
Orpheus, under the command of Captain Thomas Briggs, arrived off Jamaica from England in the evening of 22 January 1807. Being short of water, Briggs decided to try to sail her into Port Royal, rather than wait for a pilot. Around midnight Orpheus grounded on a reef that was not accurately marked on her charts. Efforts to lighten her failed and she took on water. When the water reached her main deck, the crew took to the boats, abandoning her.
