= Salve (film) =

2011 film

- Theatrical poster
- Directed by: Alireza Davood Nejad
- Written by: Alireza Davoudnejad
- Produced by: Alireza Davoudnejad
- Starring: Tannaz Tabatabaei
- Cinematography: Reza Sheykhi
- Release date: 2011
- Running time: 95 minutes
- Country: Iran
- Language: Persian

Salve (Persian: مَرهَم, translit. Marham) is a 2011 Iranian drama film directed by Alireza Davood Nejad. Kobra Hassanzadeh Esfahani won the Best Actress award in the Asia Africa section at 7th Dubai International Film Festival.

== Cast ==
- Tannaz Tabatabaei as Maryam
- Ehteram-Sadat Habibian as Ehteram
- Kobra Hassanzadeh Esfahani as Ashraf Sadat
- Alireza Davood Nejad as Reza

== Reception ==
Well-known Iranian directors such as Bahram Beizayi and Asghar Farhadi praised the film.
