= HMS Badger =

Eight ships and one shore establishment of the Royal Navy have borne the name HMS Badger, after the Eurasian badger:

Ships

- HMS Badger (1745) was a 14-gun sloop launched in 1745 and lost in 1762.
- HMS Badger (1776) was a 14-gun brig, purchased from civilian service in 1776, where she had been named Pitt. She was condemned in 1777.
- HMS Badger (1777) was a brig purchased in 1777 and sold in 1784.
- HMS Badger (1794) was a 4-gun gunvessel, formerly a Dutch hoy, purchased in 1794 and sold in 1802.
- HMS Badger (1808) was 10-gun Cherokee-class brig-sloop launched in 1808. She was used as a mooring vessel from 1835, was beached in 1860 and broken up in 1864.
- HMS Badger (1854) was a wood screw gunboat launched in 1854. She was to have been named HMS Ranger, but was renamed prior to her launch. She was broken up in 1864.
- HMS Badger (1872) was an Ant-class iron screw gunboat launched in 1872 and sold in 1908.
- HMS Badger (1911) was an Acheron-class torpedo boat destroyer launched in 1911 and sold in 1921.

Shore establishment

- HMS Badger (shore establishment) was commissioned in 1939 as the headquarters of the Flag Officer In Charge, Harwich. The site was decommissioned in 1946, but the facility remained an emergency port control until 1992.

Hired armed vessels

- His Majesty's hired armed cutter Badger shared in the prize money for Dutch vessels captured at the Vlieter Incident on 30 August 1799.
- His Majesty's hired armed cutter Badger served the Royal Navy under contract between 16 November 1811 and 13 May 1814.

Excise cutter

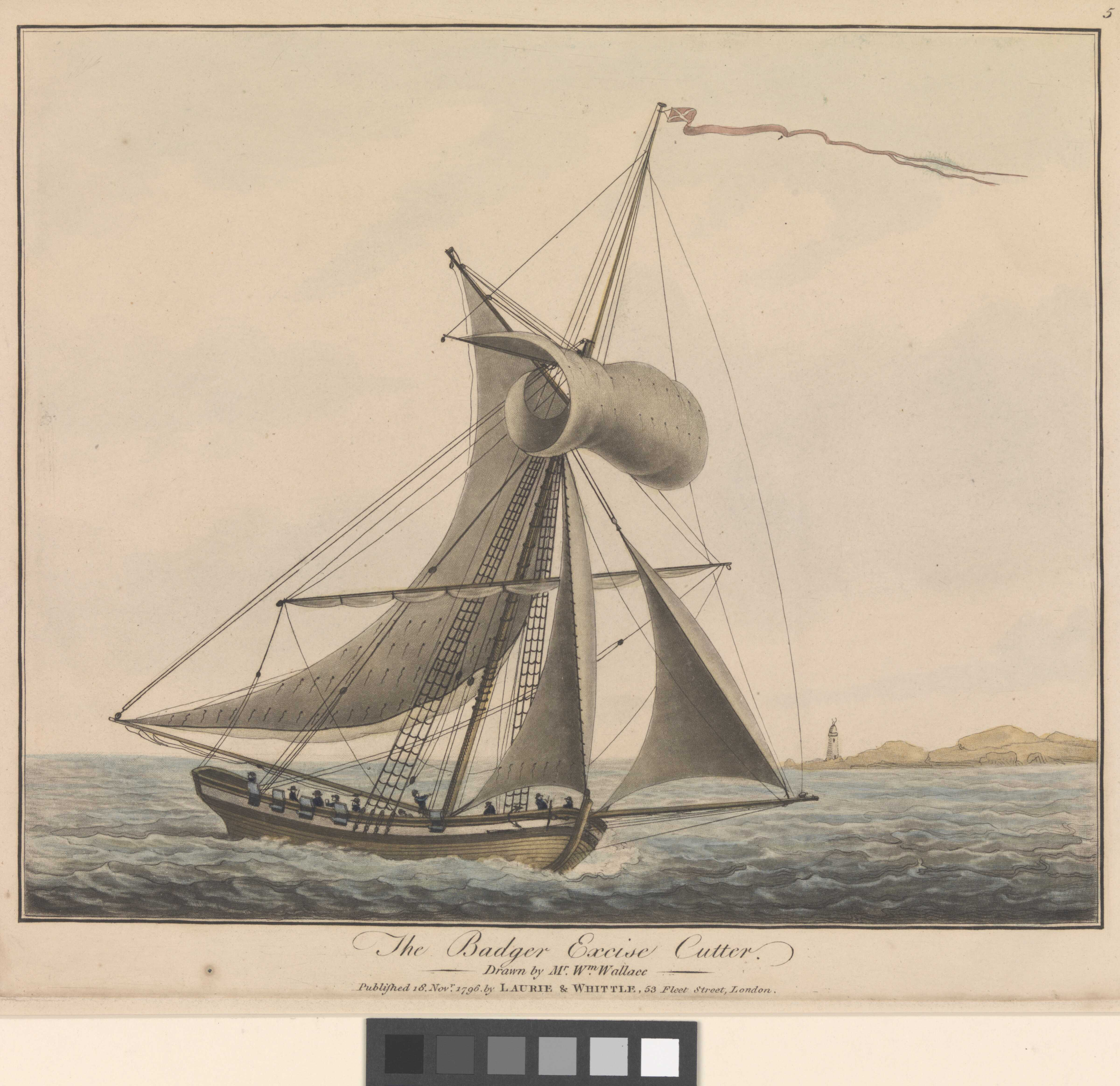
HMRC Badger (cutter, 1794) 10 guns, drawing published in 1796

- His Majesty's Excise Cutter Badger was recorded as capturing the French privateer lugger Calaifen between Folkestone and Dungeness on 5 December 1798.
- His Majesty's Excise Cutter Badger brought into Yarmouth on about 16 December 1803 a French privateer armed with one swivel gun and having a crew of 35 men.
- His Majesty's Revenue cutter Badger captured the smuggling lugger Iris on 12 November 1819 for which her commander and crew received substantial prize money.
- His Majesty's Revenue cutter Badger captured the smuggler Vree Gebroeders a yawl-rigged cutter on 13 January 1823.

Replica

- HMS Badger is a 36 ft (11 m) replica gunboat, converted from a Great Lakes lifeboat and launched in 2001. She operates from Penetanguishene on the Canadian side of Lake Huron.
