= Nasim Adabi =

Iranian actress

- نسیم ادبی
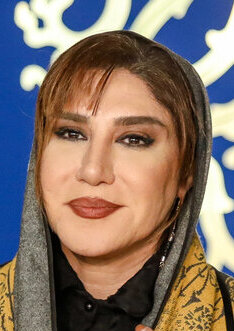
- Adabi at the 2022 Fajr Film Festival
- Born: September 8, 1976 (age 49); Tehran, Iran
- Occupation: Actress
- Years active: 1993–present
- Spouse: Ebrahim Esbati (m. 2008; died 2021)

Nasim Adabi (Persian: نسیم ادبی, born September 8, 1976) is an Iranian actress. She is best known for her roles in Shahrzad (2015–2018) and Golshifteh (2018). She has received various accolades, including a Fajr International Theater Festival Award, in addition to nomination for a Hafez Award.

== Filmography ==
Name	Director	Year
Killing a Traitor	Masoud Kimiai	2022
Hotel New Moon	Takefumi Tsutsui	2019
Dear Brother	Mohammad Reza Ahang	2019
A Man without a Shadow	Alireza Raisian	2019
Ashoftegi	Fereydoun Jeyrani	2019
Zahr-e Mar	Javad Razavian	2019
Aghigh	Behrang Tofighi	2019
Taghbaz	Shahram Asadzadeh	2018
Golshifteh	Behrouz Shoaybi	2018
Shahrzad	Hassan Fathi	2015
Mo'ammaye shah	Mohammad Reza Varzi	2015
Green Ring	Ebrahim Hatamikia	2008

== Awards and nominations ==
- Best Actor in Fajr Theatre Festival 2016
- Best Actor in Fajr Theatre Festival 2015
- Best Actor in Fajr Theatre Festival 2011
- Best Actor in Fajr Theatre Festival 2009
- Award for best actress for playing in "Puppet called Scarek" from student festival, 2002
- Award for best actor for playing in "Puppet called Scarek" from The Festival of The Bar, 2002
- Award for best actress for playing in "Acacalaureate" screening from Ardabil Festival, 1996
- Hafez Statue tteyz received best tv comedy actress from 19th Hafez Celebration for Golshifteh Collection 2019

== See also ==
- Iranian women
- Cinema of Iran
