= Khatereh Asadi =

Iranian actress (born 1983)

- خاطره اسدی
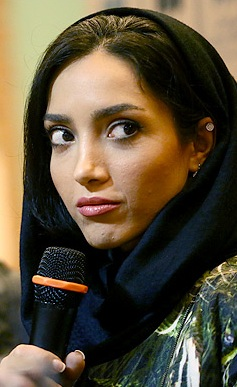
- Khatereh Asadi, 21 December 2013
- Born: 29 August 1983 (age 43); Tehran, Iran
- Education: Azad University
- Occupation: Actress
- Years active: 2004–present

Khatereh Asadi (Persian: خاطره اسدی; born 29 August 1983) is an Iranian actress.

== Biography ==
Asadi was born on 29 August 1983 in Tehran and graduated in School of Radio & Television Art & Literature. She holds a bachelor's degree in drama, majoring in acting from the Faculty of Art & Architecture from Islamic Azad University. She began working in cinema and television in the early 1980s. She was nominated for "Best Drama Actress" on Hafez Awards for her role in Forbidden. She was also nominated for "Best Supporting Actress" in Crystal Simorgh Film Festival for Aida, I Saw Your Dad Last Night.

== Filmography ==
- Crossroads (2006) as Shadi
- Praise (2006)
- Aida, I Saw Your Father Last Night (2005) as Sanaz
- Day and Night (2008)
- Shirin (2008) as Herself
- Barf Rooye Shirvani Dagh (Snow on a Hot Tin Roof) (2011)
- Annunciation to a Third Millennium Citizen (2013)
- Blind Spot (2015)
- Hot Scent (2020)
- Haft Daghighe ta Paeez (Seven Minutes to Fall) (2020)

== Serials ==
- Fall of an Angel, directed by Bahram Bahramian
- Forbidden, directed by Amir Pourkian (Nominated for Best Drama Actress in Hafez Ceremony)
- Ordinary People, directed by Rambod Javan.
- Afra, directed by Ebrahim Ebrahimian.

== Theatre ==
- Droughts and Lies (2015) directed by Mohammad Yaghoubi
- Hamsaye Agha, directed by Hossein Kiani
- Saadi Theater, Summer 32, directed by Hossein Kiani
- The Silence of the Sea, directed by Nima Dehghan

== Nominations ==
- Best Supporting Actress, Crystal Simorgh Film Festival, for her role in for Aida, I Saw Your Dad Last Night.
- Best Drama Actress, on 19th Hafez Awards, for her role in Forbidden
