= Hush! Girls Don't Scream =

- Film poster
- Persian: هیس! دخترها فریاد نمی‌زنند
- Directed by: Pouran Derakhshandeh
- Written by: Pouran Derakhshandeh
- Produced by: Pouran Derakhshandeh
- Starring: Tannaz Tabatabaei; Shahab Hosseini; Merila Zarei; Babak Hamidian; Jamshid Hashempour; Bahar Rezazadeh; Laleh Marzban
- Cinematography: Morteza Poursamadi
- Edited by: Hayedeh Safiyari
- Music by: Karen Homayounfar
- Production company: Khovarmehr Film Co.
- Distributed by: Farabi Cinematic Institute
- Release date: February 1, 2013 (FIFF)
- Country: Iran
- Language: Persian
- Box office: US$1,602,941

Hush! Girls Don't Scream (Persian: هیس! دخترها فریاد نمی‌زنند, romanized: Hiss! Doxtar-hâ Faryâd Nemizanand) is a 2013 Iranian drama film directed by Pouran Derakhshandeh. It is about a woman on death row for killing a man. Most of the film's characters seem to feel her actions were justified, unlike the judicial system of Iran. Her lawyer tries to save her. The film stars Tannaz Tabatabaei, Shahab Hosseini and Merila Zarei.

== Plot ==
On her wedding night, Shirin is arrested for murdering the janitor of their home building. She refuses to talk to the police, who believe the janitor was blackmailing her with something until she grew tired and decided to kill him. The detective informs her fiance that she has canceled her marriage with two other men previously, which appears to be what she did not want to get revealed. The fiance gets angry and his father encourages him to forget her.

Shirin's parents hire a famously skilled lawyer, who visits Shirin in detention and manages to make her state her first words after arrest. The lawyer considers this a start and learns from Shirin's mother that in contrast to Shirin's two previous marriage attempts, she chose the last one herself; and that they are true lovers. The lawyer meets the fiance, who finally agrees to help. He visits Shirin and asks her for her motive. She begins to reveal her story: When she was a child, her parents were at work most of the time and entrusted her to an assistant named Morad, who frequently abused her and took pictures of her while they were alone. The police arrest Morad, who denies the accusations. However, when pictures of other girls are found in his house, he is tortured until he confesses to dozens of sexual abuses. As a result, he is sentenced to death.

Then Shirin is asked of the reason she killed the janitor. She reveals that as she was preparing to join her fiance, she noticed her neighbors' daughter being abused by the janitor. She freed the girl and killed the janitor. The detective and the lawyer debrief the abused girl and her parents, who refuse to testify, as the disclosure of the daughter's abuse can ruin the family's reputation and become a scandal that is not accepted in Iranian culture.

The lawyer tries another way to help Shirin's case. She brings a psychologist to the trial, where the latter states that traumatic events in childhood can affect the person's mental state and behavior. The court does not accept that and sentences Shirin to qisas.

Since the death sentence can be replaced by diyya if a family member of the victim exists, the lawyer and the fiance search for the janitor's family. They discover that there is a living brother, and the fiance meets a carpet salesman who knows of the brother's whereabouts. The salesman initially refuses to talk. The fiance threatens to burn the carpets and the salesman eventually reveals the location. The fiance and the lawyer head there, but discover the brother is dying of a drug overdose. They take him to a hospital but the brother dies. As a result, Shirin is transferred for execution.

== Cast ==
- Tannaz Tabatabaei as Shirin
- Shahab Hosseini as the detective
- Merila Zarei as Shirin's lawyer
- Babak Hamidian as Morad
- Jamshid Hashempour as a police officer
- Nima Safayi as Shirin's fiance
- Amir Aghaei as Shirin's neighbor
- Bahar Rezazadeh as the school’s teacher
- Hojjat Hassanpour Sargaroui as Amin
- Farhad A-Ish as the warden
- Shirin Bina as Shirin's neighbor
- Setareh Eskandari as the psychologist
- Reza Tavakkoli as the carpet salesman

== Awards ==
Year	Award	Category	Recipients and nominees	Result
2013	4th London Iranian Film Festival	Best Feature Film	Hush! Girls don't scream	Won
2013	6th Biffes	Commendation Award	Pouran Derakhshandeh	Won
2013	International Arvayn Festival America	Audience Award	Hush! Girls Don't Scream	Won
2013	7th Celebration Writers of Cinema Iran	Best Actress	Tannaz Tabatabaei	Nominated
2013	7th Celebration Writers of Cinema Iran	Best Supporting Actor	Babak Hamidian	Won
2013	7th Celebration Writers of Cinema Iran	Best Supporting Actress	Merila Zarei	Nominated
2013	7th Celebration Writers of Cinema Iran	Best Music	Karen Homayounfar	Nominated
2013	7th Celebration Writers of Cinema Iran	Best Editor	Haydeh Safiyari	Nominated
2014	Women’s Independent Film Festival	Best Screenplay	Hush! Girls Don't Scream	Won
2014	Women’s Independent Film Festival	Best Actress	Tannaz Tabatabaei	Won
2014	Women’s Independent Film Festival	Honorable Mention	Hush! Girls Don't Scream	Won
2014	14th Hafez Awards	Best Screenplay	Hush! Girls Don't Scream	Won
2014	14th Hafez Awards	Best Actor	Babak Hamidian	Won
2014	International Independent Film Awards	Diamond Winner	Hush! Girls Don't Scream	Won
2016	12th Action On Film America	Best Film	Hush! Girls Don't Scream	Won
2016	12th Action On Film America	Best Actor	Shahab Hosseini	Won
