= Ehsan Khajeh Amiri =

Iranian singer

Ehsan Khajeh-Amiri احسان خواجه‌امیری
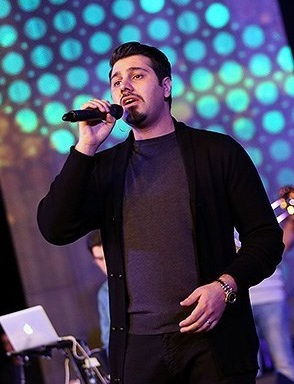
- Amiri during a concert in Milad Tower (February 2015)

Background information
- Born: 29 October 1984 (age 41); Tehran, Iran
- Genres: Persian Pop
- Occupations: Singer; composer
- Instruments: Piano, violin
- Years active: 2004–present

Ehsan Khajeh-Amiri (Persian: احسان خواجه‌امیری; born October 29, 1984) is an Iranian pop music singer. He is the son of Persian traditional music singer Iraj. He sang Iran national football team's official song for the 2014 FIFA World Cup. He has a son named Arshan, born in March 2013.

== Discography ==
=== Studio albums ===
- Mano Baba (من و بابا, "Me and Father"), 2001
- Baraye Avalin Bar (برای اولین بار, "For the First Time"), 2005
- Salame Akhar (سلام آخر, "The Last Greeting"), 2007
- Fasle Tazeh (فصل تازه, "New Season"), 2009
- Ye Khatereh Az Farda (يه خاطره از فردا, "A Memory from Tomorrow"), 2010
- Asheghaneha (عاشقانه‌ها, "The Amorous"), 2012
- Paeiz, Tanhaei (پاییز؛ تنهایی, "Autumn, Loneliness"), 2015
- 30 Salegi (سی‌سالگی, "Thirties"), 2016
- Shahre Divooneh (شهر دیوونه, "Crazy city"), 2019

Albums
Mano Baba (Official, Released 2004)
No.	Title	Native	Meaning
1	Shahzadeh	شاهزاده	The Prince
2	Jaan e Baba	جان بابا	Spirit of Father
3	Bachehaye Khiabooni	بچه‌های خیابونی	Homeless Kids
4	Raaz e Del	راز دل	Heart's Mystery
5	Fesane	فسانه	Legend
6	Eshgh & Havas	عشق و هوس	Love & Passion
7	Farda	فردا	Tomorrow
8	Az Man Joda Masho	از من جدا مشو	Don’t Leave me
9	Khodahafez	خداحافظ	Goodbye
Baraye Avvalin Bar (Official, Released 2005)
No.	Title	Native	Meaning
1	Baraye Avalin Bar	برای اولین بار	For the First Time
2	Khiale To	خیال تو	Your Imagination
3	Labkhand e Ejbari	لبخند اجباری	Compulsory smile
4	Engar na Engar	انگار نه انگار	Like nothing has happened
5	Vaghti ke Nabashi	وقتی که نباشی	When You're not here
6	Gharibaneh	غریبانه	Stranger
7	Taraneh Khuneh	ترانه‌خونه	Song of Home
8	Man Bi To	من بی تو	Me Without You
9	Hess e Gharibi	حس غریب	A Strange Feeling
10	Zamuneh	زمونه	Time
11	Mix	میکس	Mix
Salame Akhar (Official, Released 2007)
No.	Title	Native	Meaning
1	Khial	خیال	Pretend
2	Saye be Saye	سایه به سایه	Shadow to Shadow
3	Baran ke Mibarad	باران که می‌بارد	When it Rains
4	Shans	شانس	The Chance
5	Zesht o Ziba	زشت و زیبا	The Ugly & the Beauty
6	Bavar Nemikonam	باور نمی کنم	I can't believe
7	Tamumesh Kon	تمومش کن	Finish it
8	Jodaee	جدایی	Separation
9	Saale Barouni	سال بارونی	Rainy year
10	Salaam e Akhar	سلام آخر	The Last Greeting
Fasl e Tazeh (Official, Released 2009)
No.	Title	Native	Meaning
1	Nemiduni	نمی‌دونی	You Don't Know
2	Shirin	شیرین	Sweet
3	Geryeh	گریه	Cry
4	Dochar	دچار	Stricken
5	Haghighat Dare Deltangi	حقیقت داره دلتنگی	Nostalgia is True
6	Fall	فال	Presage
7	Raftani	رفتنی	Goner
8	Khoshbakhti	خوشبختی	Happiness
9	Eshgh Miyad	عشق میاد	Love Comes
10	Tab e Talkh	تب تلخ	Bitter Fever
Ye Khatereh az Farda (Official, Released 2010)
No.	Title	Native	Meaning
1	Nemidunam	نمی دونم	I Don't Know
2	Daram Miam Pishet	دارم میام پیشت	I'm Coming to You
3	Khodet Khasti	خودت خواستی	What You Wanted
4	Eteraf	اعتراف	The Admission
5	Khab o Bidari	خواب و بیداری	Sleep and Awakening
6	Bi Kasi	بی‌کسی	Loneliness
7	Kash Asheghet Nemishodam	کاش عاشفت نمی شدم	Wish I Didn't Fall in Love with You
8	Mosri	مسری	Contagious
9	Donya	دنیا	The Universe
10	Etefagh	اتفاق	The Event
11	Mosri (Remix)	مسری	Contagious (Remix)
12	Khalasam Kon	خلاصم کن	Set Me Free
Asheghaneha (Official, Released 2012)
No.	Title	Native	Meaning
1	Ehsase Aramesh	احساس آرامش	Tranquility
2	Arezoo	آرزو	Desire
3	In Hagham Nist	این حقم نیست	Not What I Deserve
4	Kojaei	کجایی	Where Are You
5	Darya	دریا	Sea
6	Lahze	لحظه	Moment
7	Khoshbakhti	خوشبختی	Prosperity
8	Tamome Ghalbe Man	تموم قلب من	All of My Heart
9	Labe Tigh	لب تیغ	Edge of Blade
10	Naborde Ranj	نابرده رنج	Never Comes Easy
Paeiz, Tanhaei (Official, Released 2015)
No.	Title	Native	Meaning
1	Tanhaei	تنهایی	Loneliness
2	Paeiz	پاییز	Autumn
3	Eshghe Dovvom	عشق دوم	Second Love
4	Haras	هراس	Fear
5	Ashegh	عاشق	Lover
6	Hess	حس	Feeling
7	Divoonegi	دیوونگی	Madness
8	Sadeh	ساده	Simple
9	Cheshmamo Mibandam	چشمامو میبندم	I Close My Eyes
10	Dard	درد	Pain
11	Gozashte ha	گذشته‌ها	Pasts
12	Tavaan	تاوان	Compensation
30 Salegi (Official, Released 2016)
No.	Title	Native	Meaning
1	30 Salegi	سی‌سالگی	Thirties
2	Akhar Hamoon Shod	آخر همون شد	That was the end of us
3	Ye Roozi Miad	یه روزی میاد	Someday
4	Jazebeh	جاذبه	Gravity
5	Jaddei Ke Sakhte Boodam	جاده‌ای که ساخته بودم	The Road I Built
6	Bi Tafavot	بی‌تفاوت	Apathetic
7	Nafas	نفس	Breath
8	Arezoo Kon	آرزو کن	Make a Wish
9	Baade To	بعد تو	After You
10	Kari Kardi	کاری کردی	Your Doing
11	Darde Amigh	درد عمیق	Deep Pain
Shahre Divooneh (Official, Released 2019)
No.	Title	Native	Meaning
1	Shahre Divooneh	شهر دیوونه	Crazy City
2	Tarkam Kard	ترکم کرد	Left Me
3	Gharibeh	غریبه	Stranger
4	Lab Tar Kon	لب تر کن	Just Say
5	Too Baroon	تو بارون	Under the Rain
6	Ba Delam	با دلم	With My Heart
7	Miram	می‌رم	I'll Leave
8	Vaghti Mikhandi	وقتی می‌خندی	When You Laugh
9	Khalasam Kon	خلاصم کن	Release Me
10	Sahneh	صحنه	Stage

=== Singles ===
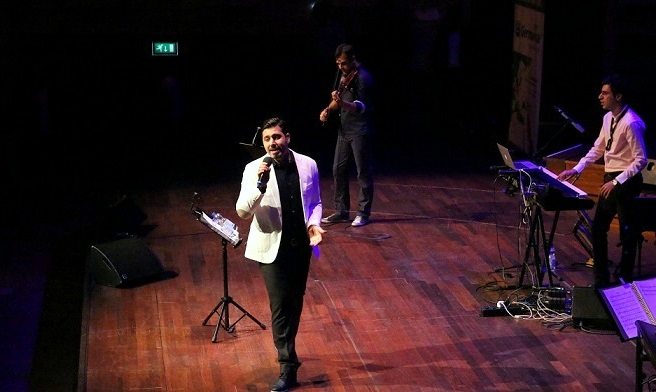
Khajeamiri during a concert in Rotterdam, Netherlands

- Vaghti Mikhandi (وقتی می‌خندی, "When you laugh"), 2018
- Aramesh (آرامش, "Calm"), 2018
- Gerdaab (گرداب, "Whirlpool"), 2018
- Ashegh Ke Beshi (عاشق که بشی, "When be lover"), 2017
- Ba Toam ( با توام, "I'm with you"), 2016
- Darde Amigh (درد عمیق, "Deep pain"), 2016
- Sanie (ثانیه, "Second") 2015
- Boghz (بغض, "Spite") 2015
- Darvazeh Haye Donya (دروازه‌های دنیا, "The gates of the world"), 2014
- Taavaan (تاوان, "Punishment), 2014
- Taghdir (تقدیر, "destiny"), 2014
- Baraye Akharin Bar (برای آخرین بار, "For the last time")
- Miveye Mamnoue (میوه ممنوعه, "The Forbidden Fruit")
- Pouleh Kasif (پول کثیف, "Dirty money")
- Majnoun-e-Leili (مجنون لیلی, the song of Majnoun-e Leili movie)
- Abre Mosafer (ابر مسافر, "Passenger cloud")
- Aghebate Eshgh (عاقبت عشق, "The sequel of love")
- Ashegham Man (عاشقم من, "I'm in love")
- Azade Azadam (آزاد آزادم, "I'm free")
- Emshab Shabe Mahtabe (امشب شب مهتابه, "Moon is Shining Tonight")
- Mesle Hichkas (مثل هیچکس, "Like no one")
- Be Dadam Beres (به دادم برس, "Help me")
- Shabe Sorme (شب سرمه)
- Daste Khali (دست خالی)
- Labkhand Payani (لبخند بایانی)
- Mosaferkhoone (مسافر خونه)
- Divoone Hali (دیوونه حالی)
