= The Forbidden Fruit =

- Also known as: Mive-ye mamnooe Forbidden Fruit
- Persian: میوه ی ممنوعه
- Genre: Drama
- Written by: Alireza Kazemipour
- Directed by: Hassan Fathi
- Starring: Ali Nassirian; Amir Jafari; Hanieh Tavassoli; Tannaz Tabatabaei; Gohar Kheirandish; Ammar Tafti; Shabnam Farshadjoo; Kianoosh Gerami
- Opening theme: "Idle"
- Ending theme: "Forbidden Fruit"
- Composer: Ehsan Khajeh Amiri
- Country of origin: Iran
- Original language: Persian
- No. of seasons: 1
- No. of episodes: 30

Production
- Producer: Esmaeel Afifeh
- Production locations: Tehran, Iran
- Cinematography: Afshin Ahmadi
- Camera setup: Multi-camera
- Running time: 30–45 minutes
- Production company: Islamic Republic of Iran Broadcasting

Original release
- Network: IRIB TV2
- Release: 3 December 2007 – 2008

The Forbidden Fruit (Persian: میوه ی ممنوعه, romanized as Mive-ye mamnooe or Mive mamnooe) is an Iranian drama television series created for the channel IRIB TV2. It was filmed in Tehran, Iran. It was directed by Hassan Fathi and written by Alireza Kazemipour. It ran for one season of 30 episodes, which are sometimes grouped into 22 episodes when shown in reruns.

The plot centers on the disappearance and later murder of a company owner, Shayegan. His daughter Hasti, his creditor Jalal, and Jalal's family all become involved in the search for Shayegan and his killer.

It premiered on 3 December 2007. Episodes aired on weekdays at 6:00 PM. This program features a soundtrack that was composed and performed by Ehsan Khajeh Amiri. The ending theme was released as a single by Amiri.

== Plot ==
A devoutly religious man of considerable age called Haj Younis is thrown into a whirlwind of emotions when he meets the young daughter of a man whose bankruptcy she blames on his son, Jalal. He finds himself fighting his heart to prove his long-lived faith, but inevitably falls prey to the restless desires the young girl incites in him.

== Cast and characters ==
- Ali Nassirian as Haj Younis
- Amir Jafari as Jalal Younis
- Hanieh Tavassoli as Hasti
- Gohar Kheirandish as Ghodsi
- Nima Reisi as Mostafa
- Tannaz Tabatabaei as Gazal
- Ammar Tafti as Farzad
- Shabnam Farshadjoo as Samaneh
- Kianoosh Gerami as Shahram
- Sedigheh Kianfar as Aziz
