= Drown (film) =

2020 Iranian drama film

- Film poster
- Persian: شنای پروانه
- Directed by: Mohammad Kart
- Written by: Pedram Pour Amiri; Hossein Amiri Domari; Mohammad Kart
- Produced by: Rasul Sadr Ameli
- Starring: Javad Ezzati; Tannaz Tabatabaei; Amir Aghaei; Ali Shadman; Pantea Bahram
- Cinematography: Saman Lotfian
- Music by: Masoud Sekhavatdoost
- Release date: February 1, 2020 (FIFF)
- Country: Iran
- Language: Persian

Drown (Persian: شنای پروانه, romanized: Shenā-ye Parvāneh; also titled Butterfly Stroke) is an Iranian drama crime mystery film directed by Mohammad Kart. The film screened for the first time at the 38th Fajr Film Festival and earned 12 nominations and received 5 awards.

== Plot ==
Parvaneh (Tanaz Tabatabai) goes to her brother-in-law Hojjat (Javad Ezzati)'s refinery garage and asks him to stop his brother Hashem (Amir Aghaei). Hashem has gone to a swimming pool with his henchmen for revenge and is destroying it because a video of Parvaneh swimming in the swimming pool is published on the Internet. On the way back from the pool, Hashem kills Parvaneh. The court sentences Hashem to death. Hojjat and his father (Nader Shahsavari) go to Parvaneh's father (Alireza Davoudnejad) for consent. Parvaneh's father says he only agrees if the one who took the video is found. Police say the SIM card that first aired the film belonged to a man named Reza Zare, who recently escaped from an addiction camp. Hojjat is looking for Reza along with Mosayeb (Mahdi Hosseininia), Hashem's close friend. But they find that Reza is dead.

With Hashem's guidance, Hojjat goes to the people who worked with Hashem. These include Ashkan (Ali Shadman) who owns a liquor factory and Shapoor (Panthea Bahram) who runs a casino. But both deny involvement in the filming. The next day, the police arrests all the people Hojjat had approached. Their henchmen blame Hojjat for reporting them to the police and attack his house. Hojjat, along with her sister-in-law Mohammad (Iman Safa), kidnaps and harasses people in the region who have a history of snitching.

Akbar Kenti (Behrouz Panahandeh), one of the abductees, admits that it was him that reported to the police and he did so on the orders of a woman who claimed to be the temporary wife of Hojjat. Hojjat pulls the woman (Aban Asgari) to his garage by a fake accident and puts pressure on her. The woman confesses to filming Parvananeh and hiring Akbar under Mosayeb's order.

Hojjat kidnaps Mosayeb who confesses to everything with the motive of taking revenge on Hashem and says that a few years ago Hashem hired several people to kidnap and rape Mosayeb. He also says that the arrest of Hojjat for inadvertently smuggling, followed by abortion and infertility of Afsaneh (Mahlaqa Bagheri), Hojjat's wife, was a plan of Hashem. He also says that Hojjat has inadvertently smuggled Methamphetamine for Hashem and Mosayeb several times.

Hojjat takes some money from Mosayeb to set him free. Instead, he prepares three and a half kilos of Methamphetamine (the amount which can follow a death sentence for the smuggler) and embeds it in Mosayeb's apartment and calls the police to arrest him. In the last scene of the film, Hojjat tells his family that he has not been able to find the distributor of the film.

== Cast ==
- Javad Ezzati as Hojat
- Amir Aghaei as Hashem
- Tannaz Tabatabaei as Parvaneh
- Ali Shadman as Ashkan
- Pantea Bahram as Shapoor
- Alireza Davood Nejad as Ahmad
- Mahlagha Bagheri as Afsaneh
- Mehdi Hosseininia as Mosayeb
- Iman Safa as Mohammad
- Hojjat Hassanpour as Hossein
- Nahid Moslemi as Toobi
- Aban Asgari as The Woman / Film Recorder

== Reception ==
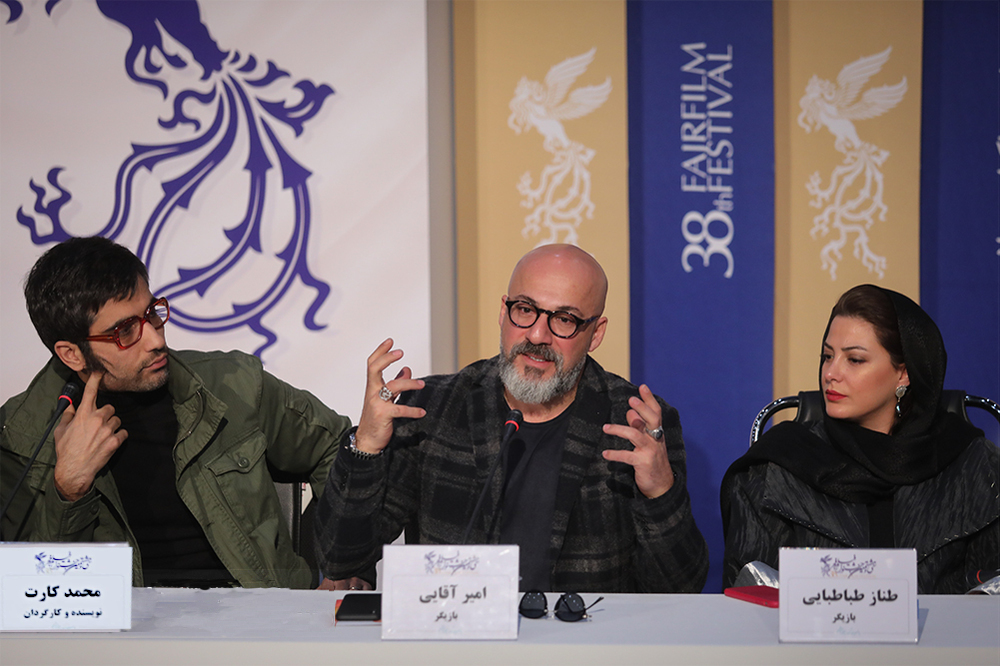
Mohammad Kart, Amir Aghaei and Tannaz Tabatabaei in 38th Fajr Film Festival.

=== Awards and nominations ===
Year	Award	Category	Recipient	Result
2022	Fajr Film Festival	Best Film	Rasul Sadr Ameli	Nominated
2022	Fajr Film Festival	Best Director	Mohammad Kart	Nominated
2022	Fajr Film Festival	Best Screenplay	Pedram Pour Amiri, Hossein Amiri Domari, Mohammad Kart	Nominated
2022	Fajr Film Festival	Best Supporting Actress	Tannaz Tabatabaei	Won
2022	Fajr Film Festival	Best Supporting Actor	Amir Aghaei	Won
2022	Fajr Film Festival	Best Cinematography	Saman Lotfian	Nominated
2022	Fajr Film Festival	Best Original Score	Masoud Sekhavatdoust	Nominated
2022	Fajr Film Festival	Best Makeup Design	Azim Farain	Nominated
2022	Fajr Film Festival	Best Custom Design	Ghazaleh Motamed	Nominated
2022	Fajr Film Festival	Best Editor	Esmaeil Alizade	Won
2022	Fajr Film Festival	Best Sound	Best Sound Effects: Mehdi Salehkermani	Won
2022	Fajr Film Festival	Best Sound	Best Sound Recording: Arash Ghasemi	Won
2022	Fajr Film Festival	Best Special Effects	Arash Aghabeik	Nominated
2022	Fajr Film Festival	Audience Choice of Best Film	Mohammad Kart	Won
2022	Hafez Awards	Best Film	Rasul Sadr Ameli	Nominated
2022	Hafez Awards	Best Director	Mohammad Kart	Nominated
2022	Hafez Awards	Best Screenplay	Pedram Pour Amiri, Hossein Amiri Domari, Mohammad Kart	Nominated
2022	Hafez Awards	Best Actor	Javad Ezzati	Nominated
2022	Hafez Awards	Best Actor	Amir Aghaei	Nominated
2022	Hafez Awards	Best Actor	Mehdi Hosseininia	Nominated
2022	Hafez Awards	Best Actress	Tannaz Tabatabaei	Nominated
2022	Hafez Awards	Best Actress	Pantea Bahram	Nominated
2022	Hafez Awards	Best Editor	Ismael Alizadeh	Nominated
2022	Hafez Awards	Best Cinematography	Saman Lotfian	Nominated
2022	Iranian Cinema Directors' Great Celebration	Best New Film Director	Mohammad Kart	Nominated
2022	Iran's Film Critics and Writers Association	Best Film	Rasul Sadr Ameli	Nominated
2022	Iran's Film Critics and Writers Association	Best Director	Mohammad Kart	Nominated
2022	Iran's Film Critics and Writers Association	Best Screenplay	Pedram Pour Amiri, Hossein Amiri Domari, Mohammad Kart	Nominated
2022	Iran's Film Critics and Writers Association	Best Actor in a Leading Role	Javad Ezzati	Nominated
2022	Iran's Film Critics and Writers Association	Best Actor in a Supporting Role	Amir Aghaei	Nominated
2022	Iran's Film Critics and Writers Association	Best Actress in a Supporting Role	Tannaz Tabatabaei	Nominated
2022	Iran's Film Critics and Writers Association	Best Editor	Ismael Alizadeh	Nominated
2022	Iran's Film Critics and Writers Association	Best Original Score	Masoud Sekhavatdoost	Nominated
2022	Iran's Film Critics and Writers Association	Best Creativity and Talent (first filmmakers)	Mohammad Kart	Nominated
2022	Urban International Film Festival	Best Film	Rasul Sadr Ameli	Nominated
2022	Urban International Film Festival	Best Director	Mohammad Kart	Nominated
2022	Urban International Film Festival	Best Screenplay	Pedram Pour Amiri, Hossein Amiri Domari, Mohammad Kart	Won
2022	Urban International Film Festival	Best Actor	Amir Aghaei	Nominated
2022	Urban International Film Festival	Best Actress	Pantea Bahram	Nominated
2022	Urban International Film Festival	Best Technical	Ismael Alizadeh	Nominated
