= Hotel New Moon =

- Film poster
- Directed by: Takefumi Tsutsui
- Written by: Naghmeh Samini; Jun Kawasaki
- Produced by: Javad Noruzbegi; Shohreh Golparian; Shôji Masui
- Starring: Mahnaz Afshar; Laleh Marzban; Masatoshi Nagase; Ali Shadman; Nasim Adabi
- Cinematography: Katsumi Yanagijima
- Edited by: Sohrab Khosravi
- Music by: Hamed Sabet
- Production companies: Altamira Pictures; Qabe Aseman; Small Talk
- Distributed by: Namava, Filimo (Iran) 7thartfilms (Worldwide)
- Release dates: April 20, 2019 (FIFF); May 20, 2020 (Iran)
- Running time: 89 minutes
- Countries: Iran; Japan
- Languages: Persian; Japanese; English

Hotel New Moon (Persian: مهمانخانه ماه نو, romanized: Mehmankhane Mahe No, Japanese: ホテルニュームーン, romaji: hoterunyūmūn) is a 2019 Iranian drama film directed by Takefumi Tsutsui and written by Naghmeh Samini and Jun Kawasaki. The film screened for the first time at the 37th Fajr International Film Festival.

== Cast ==
- Mahnaz Afshar as Noushin Tavakol
- Laleh Marzban as Mona Tavakol
- Masatoshi Nagase as Takeshi Tanaka
- Ali Shadman as Sahand
- Nasim Adabi as Roya
- Ayako Kobayashi as Etsuko Tanaka
- Maryam Boubani as Noushin's mother
- Javad Yahyavi as Takeshi's translator
- Marjan Alavi as Amanbakht
