= Aida, I Saw Your Dad Last Night =

2004 film by Rasul Sadrameli

- Directed by: Rasul Sadrameli
- Screenplay by: Rasul Sadrameli; Kambuzia Partovi
- Based on: Nora’s Father by Marjan Shirmohammadi
- Produced by: Ali Sartipi; Rasul Sadrameli
- Starring: Sophie Kiani; Sharareh Dolatabadi; Shahrokh Foroutanian; Khatereh Asadi; Tannaz Tabatabaei
- Cinematography: Bahram Badakshani
- Edited by: Masoumeh Shahnazari
- Music by: Fariborz Lachini
- Release date: 2004
- Running time: 90 minutes
- Country: Iran
- Language: Persian

Aida, I Saw Your Dad Last Night (Persian: دیشب باباتو دیدم آیدا) is a 2004 Iranian coming-of-age drama film directed by Rasul Sadrameli based on Marjan Shirmohammadi's novel Nora's Father.

== Cast ==
- Sophie Kiani as Aida
- Sharareh Dolatabadi as Aida's Mother
- Shahrokh Foroutanian as Aida's Father
- Khatereh Asadi as Sanaz
- Tannaz Tabatabaei as Tannaz
