= I Want to Live (TV series) =

2021 Iranian television series

- Persian: می‌خواهم زنده بمانم
- Genre: Drama; Romance
- Created by: Shahram Shah Hosseini
- Written by: Majid Molaee; Pouya Saeedi; Pouria Kakavand
- Directed by: Shahram Shah Hosseini
- Starring: Sahar Dolatshahi; Hamed Behdad; Pedram Sharifi; Ali Shadman; Anahita Dargahi; Babak Karimi; Azadeh Samadi
- Music by: Masoud Sekhavatdoust
- Country of origin: Iran
- Original language: Persian
- No. of seasons: 1
- No. of episodes: 20

Production
- Producer: Mohammad Shayesteh
- Editor: Soheyl Halimi
- Running time: 44–70 minutes

Original release
- Network: Filimo
- Release: 22 February – 5 July 2021

I Want to Live (Persian: میخواهم زنده بمانم, romanized: Mikhaham Zende Bemanam) is a 2021 Iranian television series written by Majid Molaee, Pouya Saeedi, and Pouria Kakavand and directed by Shahram Shah Hosseini, and starring Sahar Dolatshahi, Hamed Behdad and Pedram Sharifi. Each episode was released on Filimo.

== Synopsis ==
Homa (Sahar Dolatshahi) and Nader (Pedram Sharifi), two teachers, are about to get married. On the night of Homa's father's birthday (Babak Karimi), police officers come to their house and find drugs in her father's car. The officers arrest her father and take him to the police station. Homa goes there and realizes that the sentence for possessing this amount of drugs is death penalty. She is introduced to a lawyer who has a reputation for saving people with difficult cases. Home goes with Nader to see the lawyer, Amir Shaygan (Hamed Behdad). After meeting with the lawyer, He asks Nader to come to the place he says for one night and talk to him about the condition of accepting their case. After Nader goes to the place, Amir tells him that if he leaves Homa and she marries him, he will accept the case.

== Cast ==
- Sahar Dolatshahi as Homa Haghi
- Hamed Behdad as Amir Shaygan
- Pedram Sharifi as Nader Sarmad
- Ali Shadman as Kaveh
- Anahita Dargahi as Shiva Mastour
- Babak Karimi as Homayoun Haghi
- Azadeh Samadi as Zohreh Afshar
- Amir Norouzi as Yahya Farrokhi
- Mehdi Hosseininia as Meftah
- Mehran Ahmadi as Bahman Dashti
- Farid Sajjadi Hosseini as Afshar, Zohreh's father
- Afsaneh Chehreh Azad as Fakhri, Homayoun's wife and Homa's mother
- Ezatollah Mehravaran
- Nahid Moslemi
- Mehdi Sabaghi
- Mohmmad Reza Maleki
- Maedeh Tahmasebi
- Bahram Ebrahimi
- Roya Javidnia
- Nafiseh Zare
- Bahareh Kianafshar
- Mani Shah Hosseini
- Shahram Shah Hosseini
- Salman Khati
- Ali Milani

== Soundtrack ==
All of the tracks are performed by Homayoun Shajarian.

No.	Title	Length
1.	"Cloudy Sky"	4:29
2.	"Weather of Your Whispers"	4:49
3.	"One Breath of Your Desire"	4:08

== Awards and nominations ==
Name of the award ceremony, year presented, category, nominee of the award, and the result of the nomination
Award	Year	Category	Recipient(s)	Result	Ref.
Hafez Awards	2021	Best Actor – Television Series Drama	Hamed Behdad	Nominated	
Hafez Awards	2021	Best Actor – Television Series Drama	Ali Shadman	Nominated	
Hafez Awards	2021	Best Actress – Television Series Drama	Azadeh Samadi	Nominated	
Hafez Awards	2021	Best Director – Television Series	Shahram Shah Hosseini	Won	
Hafez Awards	2021	Best Screenplay – Television Series	Majid Molaee, Pouya Saeedi, Pouria Kakavand	Nominated	
Hafez Awards	2021	Best Television Series	Mohammad Shayesteh	Nominated	
Hafez Awards	2021	Best Soundtrack	Homayoun Shajarian (''One Breath of Your Desire'')	Nominated	
