= A Man Without a Shadow =

2019 Iranian film

A Man without a Shadow
- official poster
- Persian: مردی بدون سایه
- Directed by: Alireza Raeesian
- Written by: Alireza Raeesian
- Produced by: Alireza Raeesian
- Starring: Leila Hatami; Ali Mosaffa; Farhad Aslani; Amir Aghaei; Gohar Kheirandish; Nader Fallah; Siamak Atlasi; Nasim Adabi
- Cinematography: Masoud Salami
- Music by: Sattar Oraki
- Release date: April 2019 (FIFF)
- Running time: 90 Minutes
- Countries: Iran; Spain
- Languages: Persian; Spanish

A Man without a Shadow (Persian: مردی بدون سایه, romanized: Mardi bedoone Sayeh) is a 2019 Melodrama Iranian film written, produced and directed by Alireza Raeesian. It stars Leila Hatami, Ali Mosaffa, Farhad Aslani, Amir Aghaei, Gohar Kheirandish, Nader Fallah, Siamak Atlasi, and Nasim Adabi. It was shot in Iran and Spain and premiered at the 37th Fajr Film Festival. The film depicts some emotional and matrimonial challenges of Iranian modern society. The film attended a number of international film festivals, including the 10th edition of the London Iranian Film Festival in the United Kingdom and the 18th Dhaka International Film Festival in Bangladesh. The Malaysia International Film Festival listed this film in its "Official selection" in 2020, alongside the Asian Film Festival Barcelona listed it in its "Special section" in the same year.

== Summary ==
Mahan is a determined documentary filmmaker who tackles the challenging subject of honor killings. Despite the importance of his work, the broadcaster rejects his film, resulting in his unwarranted firing. Faced with threats from the victim's family, he recognizes that his safety is in jeopardy. In a bold move to support him, his wife, Sayeh, secures a high-profile position at a major company. She confidently travels to Spain with her boss to close a significant deal, but upon her return, she mysteriously disappears.
