= Vahid Jalilvand =

Iranian film director

- وحید جلیلوند
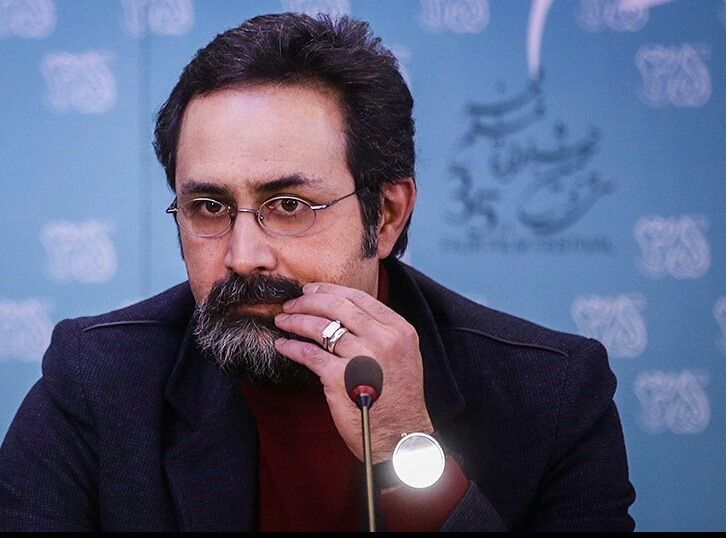
- Jalilvand at the 35th Fajr Film Festival (2017)
- Born: March 11, 1976 (age 50); Tehran, Iran
- Education: Tehran University
- Occupations: Director; screenwriter; editor; actor
- Years active: 1991–present
- Notable work: Wednesday, May 9 No Date, No Signature; Beyond the Wall

Vahid Jalilvand (Persian: وحید جلیلوند; born March 11, 1976) is an Iranian film director, screenwriter, actor and editor. He has won the Crystal Simorgh for Best First Director and Best First Film at the 33rd Fajr Film Festival and the FIPRESCI Award at the 72nd Venice International Film Festival for his feature directorial debut in drama film Wednesday, May 9 (2015). In 2017, he won The Orizzonti Award for Best Director at the 74th Venice International Film Festival for his second film, No Date, No Signature. His third film, Beyond the Wall (2022) competed for the Golden Lion at the 79th Venice International Film Festival.

== Career ==
Vahid Jalilvand was born in Kermanshah in 1976. He is a graduate of University of Tehran in theatre directing. Jalilvand started his career as a theatre actor and made his stage debut when he was only 15. In 1996, he started working in the Iranian State TV channels as an editor and then as a TV director. Later, he directed two home video series and more than 30 documentaries in social and industrial fields. He has been the director and actor in many television series and plays. “Wednesday, May 9”, his first feature was awarded FIPRESCI Prize and the INTERFILM Award for Promoting Inter-religious Dialogue in Orizzonti, Venice Int’l Film Festival 2015. “No Date, No Signature” is his second feature which was awarded best director and best actor in Orizzonti, Venice Int’l Film Festival 2017.“No Date, No Signature” was Iran's representative to the 91st Academy Awards for Best Foreign Language Film, 2019.

== Filmography ==
=== Feature films ===
Year	Title	Director	Writer	Editor	Actor
2015	Wednesday, May 9	Yes	Yes	Yes	No
2017	No Date, No Signature	Yes	Yes	Yes	No
2022	Beyond the Wall	Yes	Yes	Yes	No

=== Documentary ===
Year	Title	Director	Writer	Actor
1998	The Hands of the Crafts Creators	Dast Khaleghe Sanaa't	13 Episodes, Director	
2000	The Statue	Peykareh	26 Episodes, Director - Editor	
2001	The City of the Well-Known	Shahr e Mashahir	13 Episodes, Producer	
2004	Nostrak: North South Corridor	Nostrak: Corridor Shomal - Jonoub	1 Episode, Director - Editor	
2004	Shahid Rajaei Port	Bandar e Shahid Rajaee	1 Episode,	
2005	Amirabad Port	Bandar e Amir Abad	1 Episode,	
2006	The Coquetry of the Sun	Kereshmeye Khorshid	1 Episode, Director - Editor	
2007	Ghadir Looking at Dawn	Ghadir minegarist	1 Episode, Director - Editor	
2009	Naive Like a Father	Sadeh Mesle Yek Pedar	1 Episode, Director	
2009	Dubai, 72 Hours	Dubai 72 Sa'at	1 Episode, Director - Editor	
2013	I Grow Green	Man Sabz Mishavam	1 Episode, Director	

=== Television ===
Year	Title	Director	Writer	Actor
2005	An Eye Made of Love	Yes	8 Episodes, Director - Editor	
2006	The Footprint of Rain	Yes	44 Episodes, Director	
2007	Rain in a Different Version	Yes	26 Episodes, Director	
2007	The Star Is Out…Say Hello	Yes	26 Episodes, Director	
2008	40 Minutes Without Judgment		26 Episodes, Director	
2008	A Different Type Though	Amma No'ee Digar	11 Episodes, Director	
2011	A Frozen Heart	Ghalb e Yakhi	6 Episodes, Director	
2011	The Recall			Yes

== Awards and nominations ==
=== Wednesday, May/9 ===
- FIPRESCI Best Film Award, Venice International Film Festival, Italy
- INTERFILM Award, Venice International Film Festival, Italy
- Golden Puffin Award for Best Film, Reykjavík International Film Festival, Island
- Best First Film Director Award, Bratislava International Film Festival, Slovakia
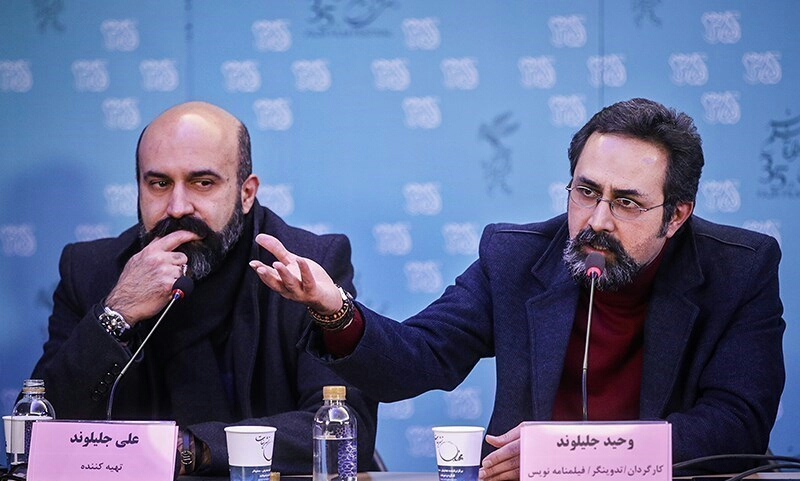
- Fajr Film Festival
  FIPRESCI Best Film Award, Bratislava International Film Festival, Slovakia
- Jury's Award, Vesoul International Film Festival of Asian Cinema, France
- NETPACK Award, Vesoul International Film Festival of Asian Cinema, France
- Best Fiction Film Award, Berkshire International Film Festival, England
- Crystal Simorgh for Best First Film Director, 33rd Fajr Film Festival, Iran
- Best Direction Award, City Film Festival, Iran
- Best First Film Director Award, Feast of Iran's Cinema Critics and Writers Association, Iran

=== No Date, No Signature ===
- Best Direction Award, in orizzonti, 74th Venice Film Festival
- Gold Hugo Award for Best Direction, 53rd Chicago International Film Festival, USA
- Silver Alexander Award, 58th Thessaloniki International Film Festival, Greece
- Critics Award, 58th Thessaloniki International Film Festival, Greecev
- Critics Award, 19th Bratislava International Film Festival, Slovakia
- Best Screenplay Award, 19th Stockholm International Film Festival, Sweden
- Best Direction Award, Sheed Film Festival, USA
- Jury's Award for Direction, Belgrade International Film Festival, Serbia
- Best Direction Award, Tarkovsky Film Festival, Russia
- Best Film Award (Grand Prix), Brussels International Film Festival (BRIFF), Belgium
- Crystal Simorgh for Best Direction, 35th Fajr Film Festival, Iran
- Best Direction Award, 20th House of Cinema Feast, Iran
- Best Screenplay Award, 20th House of Cinema Feast, Iran
- Best Scriptwriter Award, 1st Cinema Cinema Academy, Iran
- Best Film Special Award, 1st Cinema Cinema Academy, Iran
- Jury's Special Award Kinenova Skopje Film Festival, Macedonia
- Best Dramatic Feature Award, Thailand Film Festival
