= Badger Hill, California =

Badger Hill
- Former settlement
- Location in California
- Coordinates: 39°12′58″N 121°02′58″W
- Country: United States
- State: California
- County: Nevada County
- Elevation: 2,552 ft (778 m)

Badger Hill is the name of two historic mining areas in Nevada County. The first to be established, in August 1849, was located just east of Grass Valley, approximately where the narrow gauge railroad's Grass Valley station was later located. It appears to have been quickly incorporated into Grass Valley. The second was established around 1853, about 15 miles northeast of Grass Valley, 1 mile north of Cherokee and just south of the Middle Yuba River. It adopted its own mining laws in March 1854. Hydraulic mining predominated with the arrival of ditch water. It had a number of successful mines, some of which operated into the 20th century. The English Company and the Badger Hill Gold Mining Company were among the principal mines. The mines abutted those of Cherokee to the south, and Cherokee seems to have served the Badger Hill miners as a commercial and social center.
