= Badger Valley =

Valley in Wisconsin, USA

Coordinates: 43°12′03″N 89°56′02″W

Badger Valley (elevation: 732 feet (223 m)) is a valley in Sauk County, in the U.S. state of Wisconsin.

Badger Valley was named from the badgers seen there by early settlers.
