= No Date, No Signature =

2017 film

- Film poster
- Directed by: Vahid Jalilvand
- Written by: Vahid Jalilvand; Ali Zerangar
- Produced by: Ehsan Alikhani; Ali Jalilvand
- Starring: Amir Aghaei; Hedye Tehrani; Navid Mohammadzadeh; Liana Rezazadeh
- Cinematography: Payman Shadmanfar
- Edited by: Vahid Jalilvand
- Music by: Peyman Yazdanian
- Distributed by: Filmiran
- Release dates: January 31, 2017 (FIFF); September 2, 2017 (Venice)
- Running time: 104 minutes
- Country: Iran
- Language: Persian

No Date, No Signature (Persian: بدون تاریخ، بدون امضاء) is a 2017 Iranian drama film directed by Vahid Jalilvand. It was selected as the Iranian entry for the Best Foreign Language Film at the 91st Academy Awards, but it was not nominated.

== Premise ==
While driving his car, Dr. Kaveh Nariman accidentally hits a motorcycle that a family was riding on. The family leaves apparently unscathed. The next day, at his place of work, which is forensic medicine, Dr. Nariman comes across the dead body of the son of the same family, but he refuses to face the family of the deceased in order to find out the main reason of the boy's death.

== Cast ==
- Amir Aghaei as Dr Nariman
- Hedieh Tehrani as Sayeh
- Navid Mohammadzadeh as Moosa
- Zakia Behbahani as Laila
- Saeed Dakh as inspector
- Alireza Ostadi as knowledge employee
- Hojjat Hassanpour as Kamal
- Ehsan Rahim Del as the chicken owner
- Alireza Rahim Del as Habib
- Fatemeh Mortazi as Kaveh's mother

== Reception ==
=== Critical response ===
On review aggregator website Rotten Tomatoes, 91% of 23 reviews are positive for the film, with an average rating of 7.30/10. Metacritic assigned the film a weighted average score of 71 out of 100, based on 8 reviews, indicating "generally favorable reviews".

=== Accolades ===
No Date, No Signature won the Grand Prix in the International Competition in the 2018 Brussels International Film Festival (BRIFF).

== See also ==
- List of submissions to the 91st Academy Awards for Best Foreign Language Film
- List of Iranian submissions for the Academy Award for Best Foreign Language Film
