= Badger Motor =

American automobile company (1910–1911)

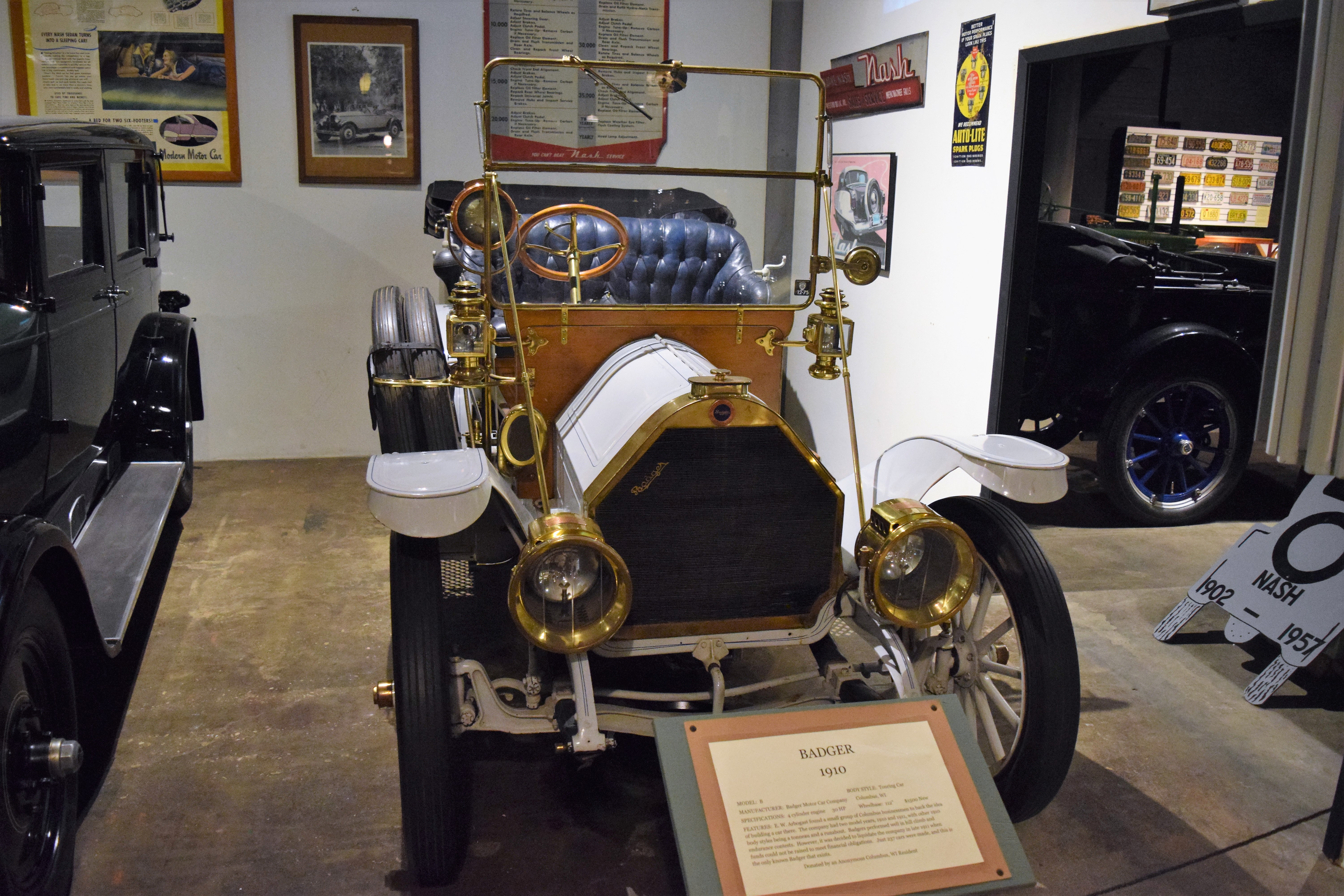
1910 Badger at the Wisconsin Automobile Museum

The Badger Motor car company of Columbus, Wisconsin, United States, was an automobile company founded in 1910.

The company produced 237 cars in two years before it went bankrupt in 1911.

== History ==
=== Origins ===
In March 1909, E. W. Arbogast, who was the son-in-law of a wealthy grain merchant from Watertown, Wisconsin, was failing to persuade anyone there that he could build a high-power, high-priced car that he could sell in the medium price range. So he went to Columbus, where he said he could build an example, test it, then sell it, but only if the town's local investors provided him money to manufacture it in Columbus. In May 1909, he was successful in attracting enough capital to start. The company was then created with A.M. Bellack (a local clothier) as president, Charles E. Fowler (a local grocer) as vice-president, and J.R. Wheeler (a local banker) as treasurer. The factory was completed in November 1909. Herman Wertheimer was the partner, who also was the Mayor of Watertown, Wisconsin, at the time period.

=== Production ===
By February 1910, storage space was important for cars completed but not yet delivered, so the Columbus Canning Company's third floor was used. Trade press was flattering. One of the sales pitches, "a Hill Climber with Power to burn," was shown when finished cars were driven to the third floor of the Columbus Canning Company for storage. The cars had 4-cylinder engines. However, luck ran out when dealers' nationwide network was not realized. Dealers already up and running did not always have good things to say, such as one Los Angeles agency who said, "Motors too small and torsion rod weakness not improved." In April 1911, investors decided to hedge their bets by going into real estate. In late 1911, the company went into liquidation. and all the land was sold to cover debts. It seems that the initial investors were made whole by the land sale.

== Models ==
Year	Engine	HP	Transmission	Wheelbase
1910	4-cylinder	30	3-speed manual	112 in (2,845 mm)
1911	4-cylinder	30	3-speed manual	110 in (2,794 mm)
