= The Badger (newspaper) =

Newspaper published by the University of Sussex

- Type: Monthly newspaper
- Format: Compact
- Owner: The University of Sussex Students' Union
- Editor-in-chief: Marni Lippin
- Deputy editor: Jack Mayfield, Isobel Garnett and Jamie Gilbert
- Founded: 1965
- Political alignment: Unaligned
- Language: English
- Headquarters: Falmer House, University of Sussex, Falmer, Brighton
- Circulation: 1,500 (monthly)
- Website: thebadgeronline.com

The Badger is the monthly newspaper of the University of Sussex's Students' Union.

The paper has a monthly circulation of around 1,500 print copies available to students and staff at the university during term time, covering news and sports on campus, as well as comment pieces, features, local life, and arts coverage. It also publishes content online. In 2025-26 the appointed Editor is Marni Lippin (Editor-in-Chief), the appointed Senior Editors are Jack Mayfield, Isobel Garnett and Jamie Gilbert.

Since its inception in 1995 under the name "The Badger", the paper has variously run as a weekly, fortnightly or monthly publication from its inception until 2017 and is the only print and online newspaper that serves the University of Sussex.

It is one of three student media outlets at the University, alongside URF - the student radio station, and The Channel - the student arts magazine.

Their mascot is a badger named "Bradger"

== History ==
The Badger, in its current form, began in October 1995, having formerly been known as Union News since the 1970s. The paper has since covered a variety of stories, including several on-campus occupations and the expulsion of five Sussex students for involvement in protests.

The Newspaper was embroiled in a scandal in 2015 when its own students' union seized copies of the newspaper and prevented them from being distributed, which also forced the then-editor to resign. The University of Sussex Students' Union claimed the papers were seized due to the potential for legal action against them. This stemmed from an article written about legal action taken by a student against the University.

In 2017, journalists from the newspaper were accused of 'fake news' and Sun level journalism by a senior member of staff, Professor Laurence Pearl, then head of the Life Sciences Department, after the paper ran a story on problems within the school. Professor Pearl stood down from his position towards the end of the year of publication.

== Awards ==
The Badger has previously been nominated for and won awards from the Student Publication Association, a body for student newspapers in the United Kingdom and Ireland. This includes winning an award for Best Sports Coverage in 2014, and former Editor, Daniel Green, being highly commended for their Outstanding Achievement award in 2016. In 2016 The Badger was nominated for Best Sports Coverage and for Best Comment/Opinion Piece. In 2022, the appointed Editor, Georgia Keetch won a SPA award for Outstanding Commitment. In 2024, The Badger was nominated for 10 National Student Awards, Best Newspaper Design, Best Overall Digital Media, Best Sports Publication Section, Best Culture Writer (Francesca Sylph), Rising Star (Semhar Tesfazgy), Outstanding Commitment (Semhar Tesfazgy), Best Lifestyle Piece (Lucy Spencer), Best Arts and Culture Piece (Harry Turnbull and Isabella Poderico) Best Photographer (Zeeshan Tirmizi) and Best Interview (Cynthia Chan). Lucy Spencer was Highly Commended for Best Lifestyle Piece, Semhar Tesfazgy was Highly Commended for Outstanding Commitment and won the Rising Star Award, Harry Turnbull and Isabella Poderico won Best Culture Piece, and The Badger was highly commended for their Digital Media. In 2025, The Badger won Best Print Design in the South East and Isabella Poderico won Best Journalist in the South East. At the 2025 National Awards The Badger received 6 nomination for Best Newspaper Design, Best Reporter (Isabella Poderico), Best Culture Writer (Lucy Spencer), Best Feature (Marianne Carney), and Best Arts and Culture Piece (Harry Turnbull). Marianne Carney won Best Feature.
