= Brussels International Film Festival (2018–present) =

Annual Belgian film festival

- Location: Brussels, Belgium
- Founded: 2018
- Most recent: 2025
- Hosted by: Un Soir... Un Grain
- Festival date: Opening: 4 September 2026; Closing: 12 September 2026
- Website: briff.be/en/

Current: 8th
- 9th 7th

The Brussels International Film Festival (BRIFF) is a film festival that has taken place in Brussels, Belgium every September since 2018.

It has no relation to the previous Brussels International Film Festival (BRFF), which occurred between 1974 and 2016.

== History ==
In its first edition in 2018, which took place in the Flagey Building, BRIFF staged three competition categories: International, European and National. In 2019, the European competition was dropped and the Directors' Week section was added.

== Overview ==
The event takes place in several cinemas around Brussels, and hosts several competitions, retrospectives, master-classes, youth activities, professional events, and programs of films around a specific theme.

The three competitions as of 2021 are International Competition; Directors' Week; and National Competition.

=== Venues ===
As of 2021, the screenings and other events of the festival take place in the UGC De Brouckère, Palace, Galeries and Bozar cinemas, all in central Brussels.

== Awards ==
=== Grand Prix ===
The main award (Best Film) is known as the Grand Prix. The inaugural Grand Prix in 2018 was won by the Iranian film No Date, No Signature.

- 2018 – No Date, No Signature
- 2025 – The Mysterious Gaze of the Flamingo
- 2026 – A Man of His Time

=== Jury Prize ===
- 2025 – Sentimental Value
- 2026 – Rose
