= Pouran Derakhshandeh =

Iranian film director, producer, screen writer, and researcher

- پوران درخشنده
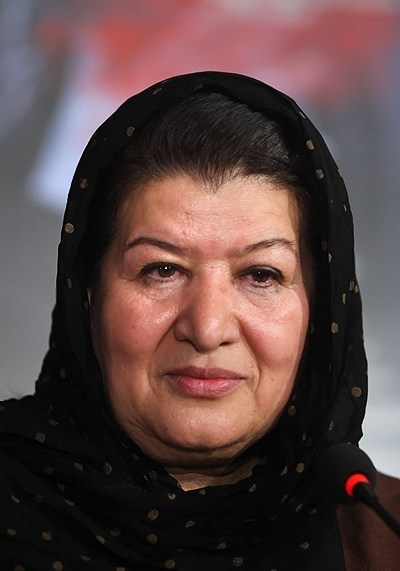
- Pouran Derakhshandeh, 2013
- Born: Pourān Derakh'shandeh; March 27, 1951 (age 75); Kermanshah, Iran
- Education: Iran Broadcasting University
- Occupations: film director, producer, screen writer, and researcher
- Years active: 1986–present

Pourān Derakhshandeh (Persian: پوران درخشنده; born 27 March 1951 in Kermanshah) is an Iranian film director, producer, screen writer, and researcher.

== Career ==
Derakh'shandeh graduated in film directing in 1975 from Advanced School of Television and Cinema (مدرسه عالی تلویزیون و سینما) in Tehran. She started her professional career by making documentary films for the Kermanshah Television and subsequently for the Tehran Television. Her motion pictures include Relationship (1986), A Little Bird of Happiness (1987), Passing Through the Dust (1988), Lost Time (1989), A Love Without Frontier (1998), Candle in the Wind (2003), Wet Dream (2005), Eternal Children (2006), and Hush! Girls Don't Scream (2013).

At the time she began working at NIRT and Produced “Plague”; A documentary about plague disease in Kurdistan Province. Next year, she produced a documentary about the "Last Wednesday of the Year" ceremony custom which is widespread in many parts of Iran, “End Wednesday” (1976). In 1978 she directed “Mineral Springs of Rah Haraz” and a trilogy documentary series about handicrafts in Kurdistan titled, “Moj, janamaz and sajadeh”, “Nazok kari” and “Short–napped coarse carpet”. The four-part “Synthetic and Natural Fiber” was a research documentary about thread, worsted cotton, silk and synthetic fiber. During 1979-1980, Derakhshandeh produced “The Wheels Whirl”. It examines economic and social depression and closed manufactures like Iran National. “Shokaran” focused on addiction. The 17-part documentary explores difficulties for women, men and children who are addicted to drugs, drug smuggling, and means of preventing drug abuse. The production lasted from 1980 to 1982.

=== Memberships ===
- WIF - Women in Film.
- IFP - Independent Feature Project.
- CIFEJ - Centre international du film pour I'enfance et la jeunesse. (International Centre of Films for Children and Young People)
- DG of Iranian Cinema.
- WG of Iranian cinema.

=== Academic experience ===
- Visual Communication, College of Social Sciences, Islamic Azad University, 1991-1999
- Film Production, College of Psychology and Educational sciences, Tehran University, 1999

Derakhshandeh has also led some college research.

=== International participation ===
With the support of Farabi Cinema Foundation, Derakhshandeh participates at some local and international film festivals :

- Jury Member of Short Film International Film Festival (2011)
- Ava Handicap Film Festival (2011)
- Jury Member of International Fajr Film Festival (2011)
- Selection Jury International Fajr Film festival (2011)
- International Children Film Festival (2009)
- International Children Film Festival (2008)
- International Cosar Film Festival (2006)
- Select Jury member at 23rd Fajr Film Fest (2005).
- Third Eye 4.Asian Film Festival, Mumbai (2005).
- 3rd Pune International film fest (2005).
- 19th Isfahan INTL children Film Fest (2004).
- 34th Roshd INTL, Film Fest (2004).
- 18th Isfahan children INTL Film Fest (2003).
- Select Jury member at Varesh Film Fest (2003).
- 3rd Olympic sports and TV Film Fest (2003).
- IRIB collage Film Fest.
- Milad Koosar Documentary Film Fest.
- 12th Productions of provinces Film Fest (2003).
- Oil Film Fest (2003).
- Fourth Asian Film Fest in India (2001).
- Cairo Children Film Fest (2001).
- CIFEJ at 16th Isfahan INTL children Film Fest (2001).
- (oozra) Woman Villager Film Fest.(2000)
- Saabs Environment Film Fest (2000).

== Filmography ==
=== Screenwriting ===
- Mute contact (1985)
- Passing through the Dust (1988)
- Lost Time (1988)
- That Night in the Train (1989)
- Parvin Etesami (1993–95)
- Love without Frontiers (1998)
- Candle in the Wind (2003)
- Wet Dream (2004)
- Farangis (2004)
- Masoume (2005)

=== Documentary films ===
- Plague (1975)
- End Wednesday (1976)
- Gelim (1978)
- Revolve Gears (1978)
- Conium (1980)
- Tiger of Eshgh Valley (2001–2002)
- Springs of Sanghestan Valley (2001–2002)
- A Necklace of Dandelions for My Sister (2001–2002)
- Six Brides for Ameneh (2001–2002)
- Rasul, A Little Hercule (2001–2002)
- Shobo from Sunset til Sunset (2001–2002)

=== Feature films ===
- Mute Contact (1986)
- A Little Bird of Happiness (1987)
- Passing through the Dust (1988)
- Lost Time (1989)
- A Love without Frontier (1998)
- Candle in the Wind (2003)
- Wet Dream (2005)
- Eternal Children (2006)
- Twenty (20) Produced by Pouran Derakhshandeh (2009)
- Endless Dream (2010)
- Professorials (2010)
- Hush! Girls Don't Scream (2013)
- Under the Smoky Roof (2017)

== Awards ==
- "Eternal Children" was elected as the best movies in "Hygiene, Safety, Health" Section Of 37th ROSHD international Film Festival
- Carlo Vevari International Film Festival First Prize for Twenty (20) (Producer and Director)
- "The Eternal Children" won six "Golden Butterfly" awards at the 21st Children and Young Adults Film Festival Sections :
  - "The Golden Butterfly" award for the best artistic and technical film
  - "The Golden Butterfly" award for the best director of the feature film
  - "The Golden Butterfly" award for the best young adult artist, Ali Ahmadifar The Iranian Cinema
  - "The Golden Butterfly" award for the best feature film (Producer & Director: Pouran Derakhshandeh ) The Children and Young Adults Jury
  - "The Golden Butterfly " award for the best feature film Audience Award
  - "The Golden Butterfly" award for the most welcomed Iranian film Out of Competition
- "Diploma of Honor" for the Best Film, awarded by Hamedan Municipality Jury Eternal Children
- Winner of two Crystal Simorgh awards in the 25th Fajr International Film Festival:
  - Crystal Simorgh for Best Film Music for Mr. Kambiz Roshan Ravan
  - Crystal Simorgh for Best Actress in a Supporting Role For Ms. Pantea Bahram
- Eternal Children Was Elected By Welfare Office In The Peritheral Part of The Festival
- A Golden Statue & Cash Prize for the best Family & Educational Movie(Wet Dream) From 36th Roshod INTL Film Fest-Tehran 2006
- A Golden Statue & Cash Prize for the best Actor(Wet Dream) - Faramarz Gharibian
- Special Prize Of the Educational Department for Handicapped Children for "Relationship" and "Little Bird Of Happiness".
- A Candle in the Wind nominated in three categories. It won “Crystal simorgh” for the best leading actor, Bahram Radan, at the 22nd Fajr International Film Festival. It was also nominated in eight categories at House Cinema Film Fest.
- Special Mention at “Family Film” for her career.
- Honor diploma for “Six Brides for Ameneh” at Shahrekord “Women and Cinema” Film Fest (2002).
- Special Jury award from “Student and Graduates of IRIB College Film Fest” for love without—Frontier (2001).
- First “Golden Torch” Prize for "A Little Bird of Happiness" at Korean Film Fest (2001).
- Best Film "A Little Bird of Happiness" at Women's Film Fest (1992).
- Honor diploma and Grand Prize for "A Little Bird of Happiness" at Argentina Women's Film Fest (1988).
- Five awards for "A Little Bird of Happiness" at Fajr Film Fest (1987).
- Special mentions for “Mute Connection (Relationship)“ at Giffoney
- Audience Award for Best Film at 31st Fajr Film Festival - "Hush! Girls Don't Scream" (2013)
- Best Film Award and London Iranian Film Festival - "Hush! Girls Don't Scream"(2013)

== Retrospectives of Derakhshandeh's works ==
- Locarno International Film Festival (1995)
- Bangladesh International Film Festival (2005)
- Bombay International Film Festival (2005)
- Pune International Film Festival "India" (2005)
- Cinemanila International Film Festival "phelepin" (2005)
- Serilanka International Film Festival (2011)
- South Korea International Kids Film Festival (2011)
- Tribute to Pouran Derakhshandeh at the International Fajr Film Festival (2011)

== See also ==
- Iranian women
- List of famous Persian women
- List of female film directors
- Women's cinema
