= Alireza Davood Nejad =

Iranian director, screenwriter, and producer

- علیرضا داوودنژاد
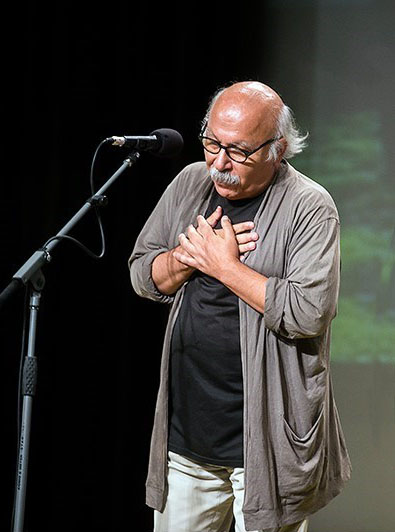
- Born: 7 May 1953 (age 73); Tehran, Iran
- Occupations: Film director; screenwriter; film producer
- Children: Zahra; Reza; Ali

Alireza Davood-Nejad (Persian: علیرضا داوودنژاد; born 7 May 1953) is an Iranian director, screenwriter, and producer. His son, Reza Davood Nejad, was a TV actor.

== Filmography ==
=== as Actor ===
- At the End of the Night

=== as Director ===
- Sweet Agony 2, 2018 - In production
- Ferrari, 2017
- Snake Oil, 2016
- Actors Studio, 2013
- Salve, 2010
- Tigh-zan, 2008
- Havoo, 2006
- Hashtpa, 2005
- Meet the Parrot, 2003
- Bachehaye bad, 2000
- Behesht az ane to, 2000
- Sweet Agony, 2000
- Asheghane, 1995
- Khal'e selah, 1993
- Niaz, 1992
- Bipanah, 1987
- The House of Spider, 1983
- Jayeze, 1982
- Ghadeghan, 1978
- Asheghane, 1977
- Nazanin, 1976
- Shahrag, 1975

=== as Writer ===
- Tootia, 1998
