= Badger (1803 ship) =

Royal Navy armed cutter

History

United Kingdom
- Name: Badger
- Namesake: Badger
- Owner: Atwood (1815)
- Builder: Cowes
- Launched: 1803
- Fate: Last listed 1822

General characteristics
- Type: Cutter
- Tons burthen: 107, or 10735/94 (bm)
- Propulsion: Sail
- Complement: 1803:23; 1807:23; 1809:33
- Armament: 1803:10 × 9-pounder guns; 1807:10 × 9-pounder guns; 1809:12 × 9&4-pounder guns; 1811:10 × 6-pounder guns

Badger was launched in 1803. She served as an Excise Cutter, a hired armed cutter serving the British Royal Navy, and then as a merchant vessel. She was last listed in 1822.

== Career ==
Captain Matthew Gunthorpe acquired a letter of marque on 9 June 1803. He was captain of "His Majesty's Excise Cutter Badger" when on 12 December he captured the French privateer Vigilant after a three-hour chase. Vigilant was a cutter of about 50 tons (bm), belonging to Dunkirk, and under the command of Citizen Jean Winnor Vanderwalle. She was armed with only one swivel gun, though her crew of 35 men had small arms. She had sailed from Ostend the day before and had made no captures. Gunthorpe and Badger brought Vigilant into Yarmouth.

Lloyd's List reported on 3 September 1805 that the "Badger cutter" had detained and sent into Yarmouth Commerce, Tirrell, master, which had been sailing from America to Amsterdam.

On 16 April 1806, HMS Orpheus, Captain Thomas Briggs, was in company with Badger. They shared in the proceeds of the capture on that day of two merchant vessels, Vrou Fingina and Vyf Gesusters. (Note: Prize money was paid in June 1815. A first-class share was worth £77 0s 1d; a fifth-class share, that of a seaman, was worth 10s 1½d.) Then on 18 April, Lloyd's List reported that the "Badger Excise Cutter" had sent Concordia, Leck, master, into Harwich.

Captain James White received a letter of marque on 29 August 1807, and then Captain William Ogle Carr received one on 16 January 1809.

Between 16 November 1811 and 13 May 1814, Badger served the British Royal Navy under contract as His Majesty's hired vessel Badger. In 1813 her master was J. Marshall. From 13 December 1813 to 16 May 1814 her commander was Lieutenant Josias Bray, and she served on the North Sea station.

Badger entered Lloyd's Register in the 1815 volume with Munro, master, Atwood, owner, and trade London—Curaçao. This entry continued unchanged through 1822, which was the last time Badger was listed. The Register of Shipping last listed Badger in 1816. She last appeared in Lloyd's List's ship arrival and departure data in 1815 when she put into Cowes on 4 October needing a new bowsprit. She had been on a voyage from London to St Thomas.
