= Mohammad Kart =

Iranian film director

- محمد کارت
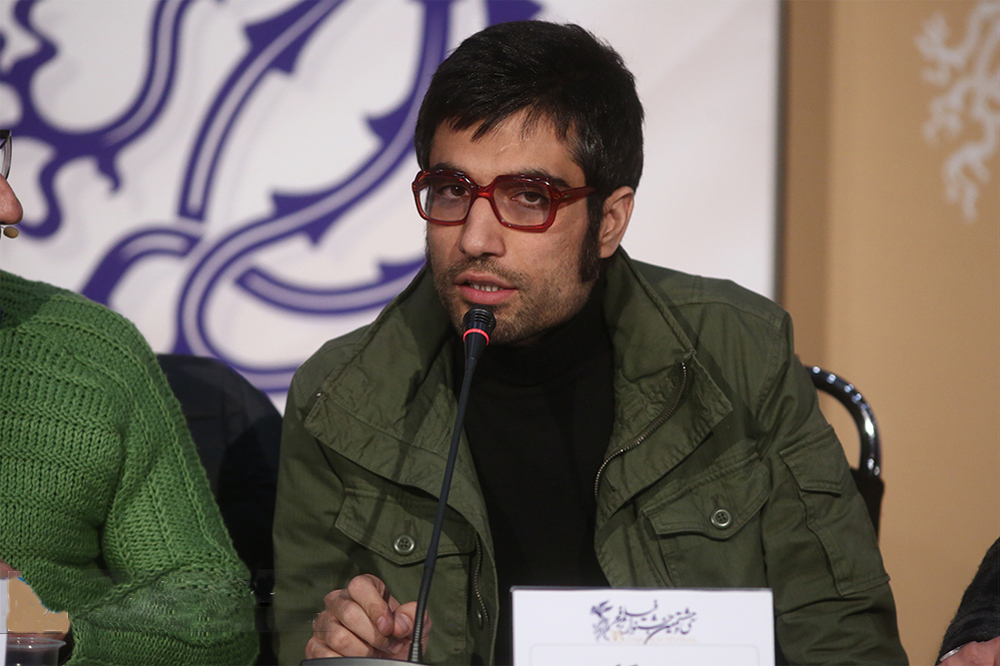
- Kart at the 38th Fajr Film Festival (2020)
- Born: 4 April 1986 (age 40); Shiraz, Iran
- Occupations: Film director; Screenwriter; Actor
- Years active: 2000–present
- Spouse: Aban Askari

Mohammad Kart (Persian: محمد کارت; born 4 April 1986) is an Iranian film director, screenwriter and actor. In 2020, he won the Crystal Simorgh for Audience Choice of Best Film for making the film Drown at the 38th Fajr Film Festival.

== Filmography ==
=== Film ===
Year	Title	Director	Writer	Actor	Notes
2011	The Report of a Party	No	No	Yes	
2012	Needlessly and Causelessly	No	No	Yes	
2012	Kissing the Moon-Like Face	No	No	Yes	
2013	Good to Be Back	No	No	Yes	
2014	I'm Not Angry!	No	No	Yes	
2014	The Sale	No	No	Yes	
2015	I Am Diego Maradona	No	No	Yes	
2016	Parole	No	No	Yes	
2016	InnWard	No	No	Yes	Short Film
2018	Pedovore	Yes	Yes	No	Short Film
2020	Drown	Yes	Yes	No	

=== Web ===
Year	Title	Director	Writer	Actor	Platform
2022	Rebel	Yes	Yes	No	distributed by Filimo

=== Television ===
Year	Title	Director	Writer	Actor
2016	Ferris Wheel	No	No	Yes

=== Documentary ===
Year	Title	Director	Writer	Producer
2014	Bruise	Yes	Yes	Yes
2015	Incubus: The Small Chance	Yes	No	No
2017	Avantage	Yes	Yes	Yes
2018	Loveratory	No	No	Yes
2020	Cocoon	Yes	Yes	Yes

== Awards and nominations ==
Year	Award	Category	Nominated work	Result	Ref.
2019	Fajr Film Festival	Best Short Film	Child Eater	Won	
2020	Fajr Film Festival	Best Director	Drown	Nominated	
2020	Fajr Film Festival	Best Screenplay	Drown	Nominated	
2020	Fajr Film Festival	Audience Choice of Best Film	Drown	Won	
2021	Hafez Awards	Best Director – Motion Picture	Drown	Nominated	
2021	Hafez Awards	Best Screenplay – Motion Picture	Drown	Nominated	
2022	Iran's Film Critics and Writers Association	Best Director	Drown	Nominated	
2022	Iran's Film Critics and Writers Association	Best Screenplay	Drown	Nominated	
2022	Iran's Film Critics and Writers Association	Best Creativity and Talent (first filmmakers)	Drown	Nominated	
