= Shahram Haghighat Doost =

Iranian actor (born 1973)

- شهرام حقیقت‌دوست
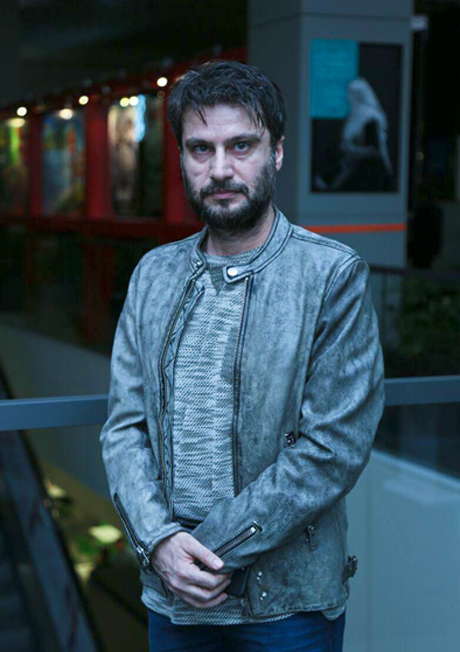
- Haghighat Doost at the 2018 Fajr International Film Festival
- Born: 18 March 1973 (age 53); Rasht, Gilan, Iran
- Citizenship: Iranian
- Occupation: Actor
- Years active: 1995–present

Shahram Haghighat Doost (Persian: شهرام حقیقت‌دوست; born March 18, 1973) is an Iranian actor. His breakout role was as Naser in the television series Red Line (1997–1998). Haghighat Doost earned a Crystal Simorgh nomination for his performance in The Heart of Raqqah (2024) at the 42nd Fajr International Film Festival and received a Hafez Award nomination for his role in Kianoush's Garden (2024).

== Early life ==
Shahram Haghighat Doost was born on March 18, 1973 in Rasht, Gilan, Iran.

== Personal life ==
Haghighat Doost boycotted the Fajr International Film Festival in light of the 2025–2026 Iranian protests.

== Filmography ==
=== Film ===
Year	Title	Role	Director	Notes	Ref(s)
1998	The Pear Tree	Student	Dariush Mehrjui		
2003	Thirst	Kourosh	Mohammad Hossein Farahbakhsh		
2003	The Crime		Mohammad Ali Sajjadi		
2009	Predicament	Yashar	Mohammad Ali Sajjadi		
2014	Kalashnikov	Habib	Saeed Soheili		
2017	Under the Smoky Roof	Amir	Pouran Derakhshandeh		
2017	Yellow	Faramarz	Mostafa Taghizadeh		
2017	Lobby		Mohammad Parvizi	Unreleased film	
2018	Cypress Under Water	Goudarz	Mohammad Ali Bashe Ahangar		
2018	Hot Scent	Ahmad	Ali Ebrahimi		
2019	Reverse	Siamak	Poulad Kimiai		
2024	The Heart of Raqqah	Reza	Kheirollah Taghianipour		
2024	Kianoush's Garden		Reza Keshavarz Haddad		
2025	The Killer and the Savage	Bijeh	Hamid Nematollah		

=== Web ===
Year	Title	Role	Director	Platform	Notes	Ref(s)
2013–2014	King of Ear	Houman Abparvar	Davood Mirbagheri		Main role	
2015	Love Is Not Closed	Bijan Mardomi	Bijan Birang		Main role	
2022	Cold Blooded	Amir Ali Toloui	Amir Hossein Torabi	FILMNET	Main role	
2023	Amsterdam	Homayoun	Masoud Gharagozlu	Tamashakhaneh	Main role	
2023–2024	The Marsh	Iraj	Borzou Niknejad	FILMNET	Main role	
2025	Beretta	Major Yunus Amjad	Amir Hossein Torabi	FILMNET	Main role	

=== Television ===
Year	Title	Role	Director	Network	Notes	Ref(s)
1997–1998	Red Line	Naser	Ghasem Jafari	IRIB TV3	TV series; leading role	
1999	The Story of a City		Asghar Farhadi	IRIB TV5	TV series; guest appearance	
2010–2011	Mokhtarnameh	Ubayd Allah ibn Hurr Ja'fi	Davood Mirbagheri	IRIB TV1	TV series; main role	
2011–2012	Flying Passion	Saeed Khojastehfar	Yadollah Samadi	IRIB TV1	TV series; main role	
2012	Goodbye Baby	Morteza	Manouchehr Hadi	IRIB TV3	TV series; leading role	
2015	Old Road	Tinat	Bahram Bahramian	IRIB TV1	TV series; main role	

== Awards and nominations ==
Name of the award ceremony, year presented, category, nominee of the award, and the result of the nomination
Award	Year	Category	Nominated Work	Result	Ref(s)
Fajr Film Festival	2024	Best Actor in a Leading Role	The Heart of Raqqah	Nominated	
Hafez Awards	2014	Best Actor – Television Series Drama	Goodbye Baby	Nominated	
Hafez Awards	2024	Best Actor – Motion Picture	Kianoush's Garden	Nominated	
Iran Cinema Celebration	2003	Best Actor in a Leading Role	The Crime	Nominated	
