= Xaniar Khosravi =

Iranian singer (born 1985)

- زانیار خسروی
- Born: 22 April 1985 (age 41); Tehran, Iran
- Occupations: Singer; composer; arrangement; sound recordist
- Musical career
- Genres: Persian pop; rap; electropop
- Instruments: Vocals; piano; keyboard
- Years active: 2008–present
- Label: OTOEPHUE

Xaniar Khosravi (Persian: زانیار خسروی, also romanized as Zānyār Xosrawi; born 22 April 1985) is an Iranian singer. composer, lyricist and arranger. He officially published his album debut named 28 in early 2013.

Xaniar was born in Tehran, and is the younger brother of Sirvan Khosravi, who is a pop singer too.

He also appeared as an actor on two Iranian films by now, which one of them is Peyman Moaadi's directing debut The Snow on the pines. Also the other film is Love is not banned a film by Bijan Birang.

His first concert tickets sold out in less than two days, which was a motive for his continued work.

== Discography ==
=== Albums ===
- Twenty Eight (28)- 2013

=== Songs ===
- after me
- Darya (Ehaam)
- Bezan Baran (Ehaam)
- cheshmanat arezoost (Ehaam)
- my mood (Ehaam)
- I'm not backing now (nemiram aghab)
- you don't know (nemidooni)
- 70 million stars(70 millions setare)
- risk
- beside moonlight (kenare mahtab)
- yes
- she
- i knew you were gonna go (midoonestam miri)
- gravity (jazebe)
- with out you (bedoone to)
- hye you
- dreamy eyes (cheshmaye royayi)
- but I'll miss you (ama delam vasat tang mishe)
- It went by fast (zood gozasht)
- hypnotism
- i still have hope (omid daram hanooz)
- I'm not a millionaire (man millionaire nistam)
- if you want (to age bekhay)
- you became my world]] (to shodi hame donyam)
- if you weren't here (to nabashi)
- i dont want to change (man nemikham avaz besham)
- rare feeling (hese kamyab)
- you make me jealous (hasoodim mishe)
- Cheraghaye Shahr

=== Music videos ===
- that's it
- Do not dodge
- Without you
- risk
- Life is all the same
- I'm not a millionaire
- gravity
- If you stay (age mimoondi)
- with out you (live)
- i knew you were gonna go (midoonestam miri)
- I'm not backing now (nemiram aghab)
- Huh

== Filmography ==
- The Snow on the pines- 2010
- Love is not Closed – 2014
- The Professional – 2021

== See also ==
- Sirvan Khosravi
- Persian pop music
