= Predicament =

Predicament may refer to:

- Predicament (2010 film), a comedy horror film
- Predicament (2008 film), an Iranian crime-drama film
