= Maryam Kavyani =

Iranian actress (born 1970)

- مریم کاویانی
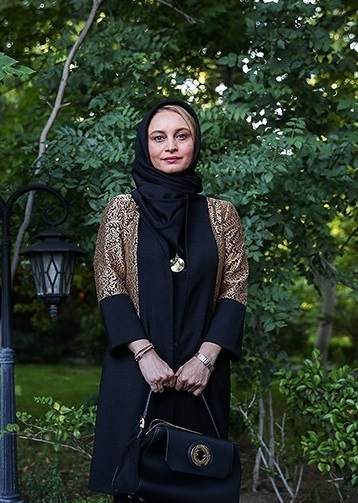
- Born: 22 June 1970 (age 55); Ahvaz, Iran
- Occupations: TV and cinema actress
- Years active: 2002–present
- Spouse: m.r
- Children: 1

Maryam Kavyani (Persian: مریم کاویانی; born June 22, 1970) is an Iranian actress.

== Biography ==
Maryam Kavyani was born in Ahvaz to Baboli parents. She lives in Tehran. Kavyani has a postgraduate degree in nursing and before entering into the acting profession in 2002, worked as a professional nurse.

In 2002 she played her first role in the feature film The Youthful Dream (Royā-ye Javāni), directed by Nāder Moghaddas. Since this time she has played in feature films Dexterous (Tar-dast), 2004, directed by Mohammad Ali Sadjadi, Spaghetti in Eight Minutes (Espāgeti dar Hasht Daghigheh), 2005, directed by Rāmbod Javān, Rival Wife (Havoo), 2005, directed by Alireza Dāvoudnejād, and crime-drama Predicament (Makhmaseh), 2008, directed by Mohammad Ali Sadjadi. She became a national household name in Iran after appearing in the role of Raanā in the television series She Was An Angel (Ou Yek Fereshteh Bud), directed by Alireza Afkhami, which was broadcast in 2005.

Kavyani has been playing major roles in mainly television series, such as The Night Way (Rāh-e Shab), directed by Dāriush Farhang, The Times of Gharib (Ruzgār-e Gharib), directed by Kianoush Ayari, and drama The Fifth Sun (Panjomin Khorshid), directed by Alireza Afkhami. The latter, in which Kavyani plays the role of Maryam, sister of Mohsen, is at present (August 2009) being broadcast by Channel 3 of IRIB.
