= Thirteen Cats on the Hot Gabled Roof =

- Directed by: Ali Abdolali Zadeh
- Screenplay by: Farzana Shabina, Ali Abdullah Zadeh, Majid Farmland
- Story by: Farzana Shabina, Ali Abdullah Zadeh, Majid Farmhand
- Produced by: Yousef Samadzadeh
- Starring: Mohammad Reza Golzar; Mohammad Reza Sharifinia; Mahnaz Afshar; Merila Zarei; Hesam Navab Safavi; Sirus Gorjestani; Mahmoud Bahrami; Mahmoud Jafari; Nima Fallah; Gohar Kheirandish
- Cinematography: Ali Allahyari
- Edited by: Kamran Ghadakchian
- Music by: Karen Homayounfar
- Release date: 15 September 2004
- Running time: 90 Minutes
- Country: Iran
- Language: Persian
- Budget: ﷼1,000,000,000 (estimated)

Thirteen Cats on the Hot Gabled Roof (2004), also known as Sizdah gorbe roye shirvani, is a Persian film directed by Ali Abdolali Zadeh. It was written by Ali Abdolali Zadeh, Farzaneh Shabani, and Majid Farazmand, and produced by Yousef Samadzadeh. The film won the 22nd Fajr International Film Festival (FIFF) Award.

== Synopsis ==
On a planet called Samurai, an important King makes a pact with the Devil. In return for his fertility, the King gives the Devil permission to choose a husband for his first-born daughter. When the King's daughter grows up, the Devil chooses a weak man as her husband. The King, along with all his daughters, is then cursed to become a cat, except for his youngest, Oudeka. In a quest for power and with a desire to reclaim her kingdom, Oudeka flees to Earth, escaping from the Devil. Several years later, Oudeka sends an agent named Ramu to planet Samurai to find her oldest sister and her fiancé to defeat their enemy.

== Awards ==
The film received an award for Best Visual Effects in Iran's 22nd Fair International Film Festival (FIFF). Yousef Samadzadeh, the film's visual effects artist, also received an honors award at the festival.

The film was also nominated for Best Visual Effects (Amirreza Motamedi) and Best Soundtrack (Karen Homayounfar) during the 8th Khane Cinema film competition.

== List of film set crew (2004) ==
=== Directors ===
- Director: Ali Abdolali Zadeh
- Assistant Directors: Hassan Laffafian, Reza Shahriary
- Manager: Hassan Laffafian
- Script Supervisors: Fatemeh Nasseri, Hengameh Farazmand

=== Cast ===
- Mohammad Reza Golzar as Ramo
- Mohammad Reza Sharifinia as Oudeka
- Mahnaz Afshar as Royka
- Merila Zarei as Gohar
- Hesam Navab Safavi as Jama
- Siroush Gorjestani as Gholam Abroo
- Mahmoud Bahrami and Nima Fallah as Gholam Abroo's Assistants
- Mahmoud Jafari as the Police officer
- Gohar Kheirandish as Granny

=== Production team ===
- Producer and Production Manager: Yousef Samadzadeh
- Project Executor: Hamidreza Samadzadeh
- Production Manager substitute: Davoud Nazemi

=== Film crew ===
- Filming Manager: Ali Allahyari
- Lighting: Shahram Najjarian
- Camera Assistants: Ali Kangarlou, Jalal Alifekr, Kaveh Haaj Ramezani
- Editor: Kamran Ghadakchian
- Art Director: Siamak Ehsaei
- Costume Designer: Fereshteh Reshad
- Makeup Artist: Jalaluddin Moayerian

=== Music ===
- Music Composer: Karen Homayounfar
- Drums: Arash Farazmand †
- Guitars: Pouya Hosseini
- Bass: Soheil Soheili

=== Sound ===
- Sound Editor: Sasan Bagherpour
- Foley Artist and Sound Designer: Ahmad Kalantari
- Writer: Francis E. Dec
