= Dead Man's Burden =

2012 film by Jared Moshe

- Theatrical release poster
- Directed by: Jared Moshe
- Written by: Jared Moshe
- Produced by: Veronica Nickel
- Starring: Barlow Jacobs; Clare Bowen; David Call; Joseph Lyle Taylor; Richard Riehle
- Cinematography: Robert Hauer
- Edited by: Jeff Israel
- Music by: H. Scott Salinas
- Production companies: Illuminaria Productions; Stick! Pictures
- Distributed by: Cinedigm
- Release dates: June 16, 2012 (LA Film Festival); May 3, 2013 (United States)
- Running time: 93 minutes
- Country: United States
- Language: English

Dead Man's Burden is a 2012 American Western film written and directed by Jared Moshe. It stars Barlow Jacobs and Clare Bowen as two siblings that reunite over the death of their father and a potential sale of their land.

The film premiered at the Los Angeles Film Festival on June 16, 2012, and was released in the United States on May 3, 2013, by Cinedigm.

== Plot ==
Martha and her husband Heck are two hardy settlers trying to survive in New Mexico after the end of the Civil War and the death of Martha's father. They're given hope for a better life when a mining company shows interest in purchasing their homestead, but things become tense when Martha's brother Wade, who defected to the Union Army, returns home after hearing of their father's death – unaware that Martha herself was the one who brought about his demise.

== Cast ==
- Barlow Jacobs as Wade McCurry
- Clare Bowen as Martha Kirkland
- David Call as "Heck" Kirkland
- Joseph Lyle Taylor as E.J. Lane
- Richard Riehle as Hank "Three Penny Hank"
- Jerry Clarke as Sheriff Deacon
- Adam O'Byrne as Archie Ainsworth
- Travis Hammer as Ben Ainsworth
- Luce Rains as Joe McCurry
- William Sterchi as W.C. Claymore

== Production ==
When writing the script for Dead Man's Burden, Moshe wrote with the intent to cast the film with lesser known actors, as he didn't want "to bring in a big-name actor who didn't look like they belong in that period." Moshe did not use storyboards, as the film had a tight budget and couldn't afford a storyboard artist, instead watching other Western films for inspiration and working closely with cinematographer Robert Hauer. Filming took place in New Mexico over an 18-day period, where the cast experienced freak storms that forced the cast to walk to the set but did not delay filming.

== Release ==
The world premiere of Dead Man's Burden was held at the Los Angeles Film Festival on June 16, 2012. In October 2012, Cinedigm acquired the film's North American distribution rights. It was released in theaters on May 3, 2013.

== Reception ==
On Rotten Tomatoes the film has an approval rating of 74% based on reviews from 19 critics. On Metacritic the film has a score of 76% based on 12 reviews, indicating "generally favorable" reviews.

Common elements praised in the film was Moshé's choice in cast, which Variety lauded as a highlight. In their mostly positive review IndieWire remarked that the lack of major stars and the choice to film a Western (which they saw as a "mostly defunct genre") could jeopardize commercial prospects. The New York Daily News's review was more mixed, as they felt that the "verbose period film has the complicated plot and tight pacing of a cable TV drama, which is then squashed into an indie-film paradigm."
