= Saeed Shahram =

Saeed Shahram سعید شهرام
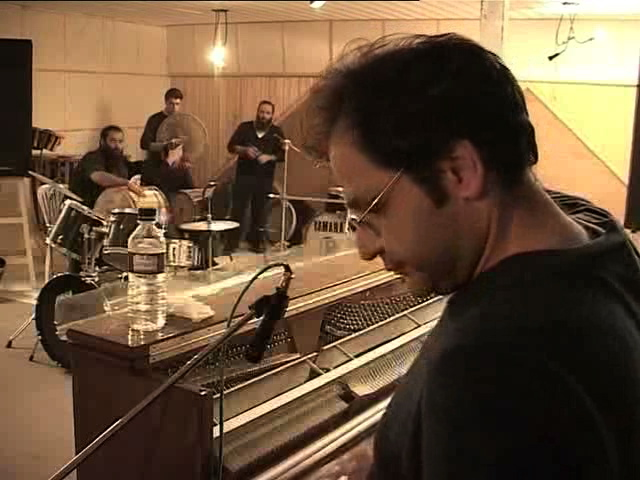
- Saeed in the studio

Background information
- Born: 1961 (age 63–64)
- Occupations: composer, arranger, and conductor
- Years active: 1984–present
- Website: http://www.saeedshahram.com

Saeed Shahram (Persian: سعید شهرام; born 1961) is a noted composer with over 60 feature-length movie soundtracks to his credit since 1983. His accomplishments include awards for the film "Two Sides of a Coin" and "Abadanies", the latter winning the prize for Best Film at the 1994 International Film Festival in Locarno, Switzerland. He studied composition, electronic music, and completed Dastgah under Mr. Pour Torab and Master Karimi in 1983. He has been composing full-time since then. Shahram moved to the United States in 1994 and has been traveling back to Iran periodically, especially since 2006, to compose a variety of scores for award-winning films, such as "Lonesome Trees" director Saeed Ebrahimefar. Currently, Shahram has several scores for film and television projects in production. He resides in Seattle, Washington and has been serving on the board of the Seattle Composers Alliance since 2001. He is also a member of ASCAP. He recently have moved to San Rafael, California.

== Works ==
Compositions

- 2023–24 – "Zal and Roudabeh": Feature Film Animation, San Rafael, California
- 2024 – "Neglected Homeland": Feature Film Animation, San Rafael, California
- 2023 – "Tell to Wind Too": Feature Film Animation, San Rafael, California
- 2022–23 – "Black Gem": Animation Feature Film, San Rafael, California
- 2021–22 – "Sublimation": San Rafael, California
- 2016–19 – "Aunti Frog": Puppet Feature Film, Tehran, Iran/Seattle, Washington
- 2016 – "Kalileh and Demneh": Animation Feature Film, Tehran, Iran/Seattle, Washington
- 2015–16 – "GITA": Feature Film Animation, Tehran, Iran/Seattle, Washington
- 2009 – "Paye Piyadeh": Feature Film Animation, Tehran, Iran
- 2008 – Life of Garib (Persian: روزگار قریب): TV Series, 37 Episodes, Tehran, Iran
- 2008 – Predicament: Feature Film Animation, Tehran, Iran
- 2008 – Winter Sleep: Feature Film Animation, Tehran, Iran
- 2008 – Amnesia: Feature Film Animation, Tehran, Iran
- 2007 – The Music Box: Feature Film Animation, Tehran, Iran
- 2007 – Virtual Truth: Feature Film Animation, Tehran, Iran
- 2007 – Higher than the Sky: Feature Film Animation, Tehran, Iran
- 2006 – Lonesome Trees (Persian: درختان تنها): Feature Film Animation, Tehran, Iran
- 2006 – When All Were Sleeping (Persian: وقتی همه خواب بودند): Feature Film Animation, Tehran, Iran
- 2006 – Encounter (Persian: برخورد): Feature Film Animation, Tehran, Iran
- 2005 – 5 PM at Ferdos Park: Feature Film Animation, Tehran, Iran
- 2005 – "Tardast": Feature Film Animation Tehran, Iran
- 2005 – The Runaway Bride (Persian: عروس فراری): Feature Film Animation, Tehran, Iran
- 2005 – Seattle Transportation: TV Series, Episode 1, Seattle, Washington
- 2002 – The Butterfly: Theatrical Play, Seattle, Washington
- 2002 – Kelvin Design: Commercial Film, Farinaz Taghavi, Seattle, Washington
- 2000 – On the Footsteps in Our Fatherland: Documentary Film, New York
- 1998 – Yves Saint Laurent: Commercial Film, Seattle, Washington
- 1997–98 – Career Advantage: Episode 26 TV Series for KCSM-TV, San Francisco, San Jose, San Mateo, California
- 1997 – Seattle Train Station: Documentary Film, Seattle, Washington
- 1997 – Hotel Carton: Feature Film International Film Festival, Tehran, Iran
- 1997 – White, Black, and Gray: TV Series, Tehran, Iran
- 1996 – KCSM-TV: Public TV Logo, San Francisco, San Jose, San Mateo, California
- 1995 – Rodell: Feature Film Animation, Chicago, Illinois
- 1994 – Abadanis: Feature Film Animation (Silver Leopards Award and Crystal Deer Award), Tehran, Iran
- 1994 – The Sting: Feature Film Animation, Tehran, Iran
- 1994 – Two Sides of a Coin: Feature Film Animation (Crystal Deer Award), Tehran, Iran

Recordings

- 2004 – Bright Colors of Hope: (Composed, conducted and arranged) World Jazz and operatic, Seattle, Washington and San Francisco, California
- 2002 – Amordad: (Composed, conducted and arranged) Cultural Anthems, Seattle, Washington
- 1999–present – Stand on the Earth: (Composed, conducted and arranged) World Jazz, Seattle, Washington
- 2001 – Gatha: (Produced, arranged and conducted) Zoroastrian Anthems Vancouver, British Columbia
- 2001 – New Seed: (Composed) World Music, Seattle, Washington and Mexico
- 1998–2000 – Ancient Whispers: (Composed, conducted and arranged) Zoroastrian Anthems, Seattle, Washington
- 1997 – Ceremony of the Soul: (Produced, arranged and conducted) World Music, Seattle, Washington
- 1996 – Invisible Borders: (Composed, conducted and arranged) New Age, San Francisco, California

Publications

- 2000 – Talking Rhythm: Mexico and United States
