= Reza (film) =

- Directed by: Alireza Motamedi
- Screenplay by: Alireza Motamedi
- Produced by: Kiumars Pourahmad
- Starring: Alireza Motamedi; Sahar Dolatshahi; Reza Davood Nejad; Setareh Pesyani; Afsar Asadi
- Cinematography: Ali Tabrizi
- Edited by: Meysam Molaei
- Release date: 2017
- Country: Iran
- Language: Persian

Reza is a drama film directed by Alireza Motamedi. This film was screened for the first time in 2017 at the 36th Fajr International Film Festival. The public screening of the film has started on March 11, 2017, in the Art and Experience group.

== Critic feedback ==
Deborah Young, a Hollywood reporter writer who watched the film at the Fajr International Film Festival, described in a note that the "obsessive initiative of films like Reza" was "a sign of the modernity of Iranian cinema". She went on to say that the prolongation of the film's plans is boring. Majid Eslami called the film "one of the most exciting first films" of recent years in Iranian cinema and described its stage design as "brilliant".

== Cast ==
- Alireza Motamedi as Reza
- Sahar Dolatshahi as Fati
- Reza Davoodnejad
- Setareh Pasyani as Wazir
- Afsar Asadi
- Farzam as Nima
