= Sirvan Khosravi =

Iranian singer, musician, and actor

Sirvan Khosravi سیروان خسروی
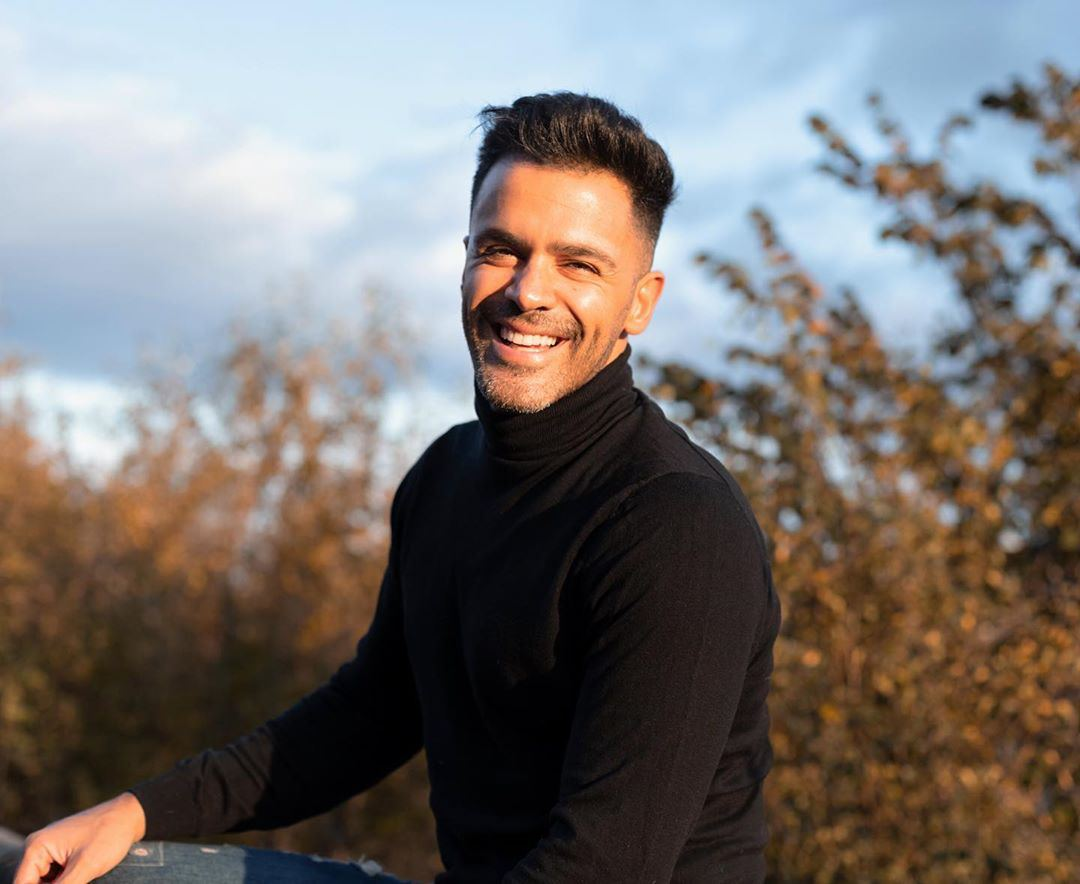

Background information
- Born: 26 July 1982 (age 44); Tehran, Iran
- Genres: Pop rock; rock; electropop
- Occupations: Singer; songwriter; music producer
- Instruments: Vocals; piano; keyboard; guitar; synthesizer
- Years active: 2001–present
- Label: OTOEPHUE
- Website: sirvankhosravi.com
- Height: 179 cm (5 ft 10 in)
- Relatives: Xaniar Khosravi (brother)

Sirvan Khosravi (Persian: سیروان خسروی; born 26 July 1982) is an Iranian singer, songwriter, and music producer. He has produced music for various artists including Xaniar Khosravi, his younger brother, who is also a singer-song writer. He rose to fame in 2005 after releasing his debut album "To Khial Kardi Beri".

== Early life ==
Sirvan Khosravi was born in Tehran. He is of Kurdish descent. He started learning the keyboard at age 11. At 16 he took some lessons with Kaveh Yaghmaei who became his mentor.

== Career ==
Before releasing his first album in 2005, Sirvan participated in the works of other Iranian artists as an Audio Engineer, Mixing and Mastering Engineer and Producer. After meeting Omid Athari Nejad in 2001, he produced his first album titled "To Khial Kardi Beri" and released it in 2005.

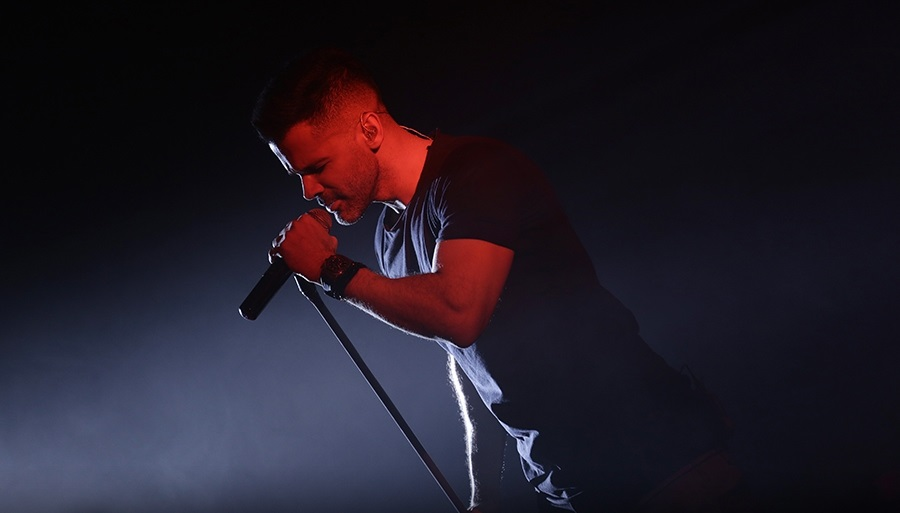
Sirvan Khosravi's concert in Tehran

Khosravi started to produce his second music album "Sa’ate 9" from 2005 and released it in 2009. He performed his first concert in February 2009. In 2012, he became very popular among Iranians by performing the end song of "Sakhteman Pezeshkan" or "Doctors' Building" show.

After gaining success with his album Sa'ate 9 with hits such as "Emrooz Mikham Behet Begam" (today, I want to tell you), "Zendegi Hamin Emrooze" (Life is just today), "Delam Gerefte" (I'm Feeling Blue), he started to work on his next album Jaddeie Royaha (Road of Dreams) which was again a success. But after releasing some "highly energetic" singles he rose to national fame and started his Iran tour and managed to gain the media and the audience's attention. He continued playing at concerts in major cities of Iran and before his unplugged album, he released some high quality music videos that his fans responded well to. He also recorded a high energy World Cup single with his brother, Xaniar Khosravi, titled "70 Million Stars". He received some praise for his unplugged album in 2016 which was filmed in Azadi Tower in 2015 and included his live performances and some behind the scenes from his music videos. This album was sponsored by AXE and was directed by the Farahbod brothers, the cover was designed by Ali Ghazizadeh, and the songs were rearranged by Sirvan's friend Kaveh Yaghmaei and Sirvan himself. His Song Tanha Nazar reached number 5 on Spotify's Hong Kong Top 50 chart on 24 May 2020.

== Discography ==
=== Albums ===
- 2005: To Khial Kardi Beri
- 2009: 9 O’clock
- 2012: Road of Dreams
- 2016: Unplugged
- 2017: Borderless
- 2020: Monologue
- 2020: Monologue: At The Top of Tehran
- 2023: Black Box

=== Singles ===
- 2006: "Stay With Me"
- 2006: "Way of the World" (Remix)
- 2007: "The Tradition of the World" (New Version)
- 2010: "Yes (Are)" (Night Mix)
- 2011: "Autumn Rain" (Baroon Paeezi)
- 2011: "I Fell in Love With You"
- 2011: "Building of the Doctors"
- 2011: "No, Don't Go" (Na Naro)
- 2011: "Saying Goodbye" (Khodafezi)
- 2012: "I Love You" (With Omid Hajili)
- 2012: "Spring is Close" (Bahar Nazdike)
- 2012: "You Thought of Leaving" (To Khial Kardi Beri) (New Version)
- 2013: "Restless" (BiGharar) (Club Mix)
- 2013: "I Love Life" (Dost Daram Zendegi ro)
- 2013: "This Soon" (Be Hamin Zoodi)
- 2013: "Shine Again" (Bazam Betab)
- 2014: "70 Million Stars" (70 Million Setare)
- 2014: "Memories Of You" (Khaterate Too)
- 2014: "Where are You" (Kojaei Too)
- 2015: "One Day You Will Come (Ye Roozi Miay)"
- 2016: "Soojehat Tekrarieh"
- 2016: "Empty Frame (Ghabe Akse Khali)"
- 2017: "Do not be surprised(Tajob Nakon)"
- 2017: "Come Back (Bargard)"
- 2017: "Many days passed (kheyli rooza gozasht)"
- 2017:"I'm happy (khoshalam)"
- 2017:"l'm not backing down (nemiram aghab)"
- 2017:"This is not a place to stay (Inja jay moondan nist)"
- 2019:"Jaye man nisti"
- 2019:"Dorost Nemisham"
- 2019:"Dorost nemisham (Xaniar remix)"
- 2019:"Tanha Nazar(Live)"
- 2020:"In Hess Naabe"
- 2020:"Tanha Nazar(Remix)"
- 2020:"Baroone Payizi(Live)"
- 2020:"Hobab (Bubble)"
- 2022: "Divoonegi"-Sirvan Khosravi
- 2023:"Oon Rooza Ro Mikham (I want that days)
- 2024:"Bargaye Narenji (Orange Leaves)

== Songwriting and producing (for other artists) ==
=== Albums ===
- 2004: Harmoonie Solh (Peace Harmony) – Farid Merci
- 2006: Varan – Varan Group
- 2006: Kenare Mahe Doodi (Beside the Smoky Moon) – Alireza Tehrani
- 2009: Bi To Tanham (I am Alone Without You) – Amir Yegane
- 2010: Eshghe Man Bash (Be My Love) – Behnam Safavi
- 2010: Romantic – Shahab Ramazan
- 2011: Asir (Slave) – Alireza Ghomeishi
- 2011: Mano Raha Kon (Leave Me) – Mehdi Yarahi
- 2012: Aramesh (Peace) –Behnam Safavi
- 2012: Asheghaneha (The Amorous) – Ehsan Khajeh Amiri
- 2012: To Mahkumi be Bargashtan (You are Convicted to Return) – Khashayar Etemadi
- 2013: "Jashne Tanhaee" (Celebrating Loneliness) – Shahab Ramezan

=== Singles ===
- 2006: "Ki Delesh Miad ke Tanhat Bezare?" ("How can Anybody Leave you Alone?") – Arsham
- 2006: "Havvaye Bi Havas" (Havva Without Passion) – Arsham
- 2006: "Mishe Asheghe To Bud" (It's Possible to Love You) – Arsham
- 2006: "Nakone Shab Berese" (Night Would Come) – Arsham
- 2006: "Asemune Eshgham" (Sky of My Love) – Afshin Sepehr
- 2006: "Javooni" (Youth) – Afshin Sepehr
- 2006: "Doosam Nadari" (You Don't Love Me) – Tufan Karami
- 2007: "To Gozashti az Eshgh" (You Crossed the Love) – Mehdi Asadi
- 2007: "Vaysa Donya" (World, Wait) – Reza Sadeghi
- 2007: "Vali Ye Roozi Dastat …" (But Someday your Hands...) – Ardalan
- 2007: "Geryehasho be Man Bede" (Give Me the Cries) – Ario Habibi
- 2008: "Mikham Begam" (I Want to Say) – Hafez Hamed
- 2008: "Khatereha" (Memories) – Moein,
- 2008: "Mesle Ye Khatere" (Like a Memory) – Nader Meschi
- 2008: "Mantaghe-e Mamnoo'e" (Forbidden Zone) – Nader Meschi
- 2008: "Yalla" (Hurry up) – Mehdi Asadi
- 2008: "Eshghe Mani" (You are My Love) – Omid Hajili
- 2008: "Baraye Asheghi Dire" (It's Late for Love) – Omid Hajili
- 2009: "Tafre Naro" (Don't Evade) – Xaniar Khosravi
- 2009: "Risk" – Xaniar Khosravi
- 2009: "Dooset Dashtam" (I Loved You) – Emad, Ramin
- 2009: "Forsate Ezterari" (Critical Opportunity) – Emad, Ramin
- 2009: "Bayla" – Ramin Khazayi
- 2009: "Karet Doroste" (Nice Job) – Ramin Khazayi
- 2010: "Hypnotism" – Xaniar Khosravi
- 2011: "Nemidunam" (I Don't Know) – Ehsan Khajeh Amiri
- 2011: "Jonun" (Craziness) – Shahab Ramezan
- 2011: "Jadde-e Donya" (The Road of the World) – Shahab Ramezan
- 2011: "Jashne Tanhayi" (Loneliness Celebration) – Shahab Ramezan
- 2011: "Kenare Mahtab" (Next to Moonlight) – Xaniar Khosravi, Milad Derakhshani
- 2011: "Hamsangar" (Comrade) – Shahab Ramezan
- 2012: "Deltangetam" (I Miss You) – Behnam Safavi
- 2012: "Kash Khoda Mano Bebine" (I Wish God See Me) – Behnam Safavi
- 2012: "Che Bi Andaze Mikhamet" (How much I want You) – Behnam Safavi
- 2012: "Khoshbakhtam" (I Am Fortunate) – Shahab Ramezan
- 2012: "Ehsase Aramesh" (Peaceful Feeling) – Ehsan Khajeh Amiri
- 2012: "Taghdir" (Destiny) – Khashayar Etemadi
- 2013: "Bedune To" (Without You) – Xaniar Khosravi
- 2013: "Dasti Dasti" Xaniar Khosravi
- 2021: "Gharib E Ashena"- Ehaam

Band musicians

- Yasha Hakami : Keyboard player
- Arash Eyvazi : Bass
- Sina Partovi : Drums
- Amir Danaie : Guitar

== Filmography ==
Television
Year	Title	Notes	Ref.
2011–2012	Doctors' Building	Opening and end credit theme songs	
2013	Raly Irani (Iranian Rally)	As himself	
2019–	Nahang Abi (Blue Whale)	End credit theme song	
2021	the professional	as Siamak	

== See also ==
- Xaniar Khosravi
- Persian pop music
