= The Ballad of Lefty Brown =

2017 film by Jared Moshe

- Theatrical release poster
- Directed by: Jared Moshe
- Written by: Jared Moshe
- Produced by: Edward Parks; Neda Armian; Dan Burks; Jared Moshe
- Starring: Bill Pullman; Kathy Baker; Jim Caviezel; Tommy Flanagan; Peter Fonda
- Cinematography: David McFarland
- Edited by: Terel Gibson
- Music by: H. Scott Salinas
- Production companies: Om Films, Inc; Armian Pictures; Dissident Pictures; Higher Content; Rival Pictures
- Distributed by: A24
- Release dates: March 11, 2017 (SXSW); December 15, 2017 (United States)
- Running time: 111 minutes
- Country: United States
- Language: English
- Budget: $5-8 million
- Box office: $7,856

The Ballad of Lefty Brown is a 2017 American western action film written and directed by Jared Moshe. Starring Bill Pullman, Kathy Baker, Jim Caviezel, Tommy Flanagan, and Peter Fonda, the film follows Lefty Brown (Pullman), a Montana frontiersman seeking vengeance against the outlaws who murdered his friend, the newly elected Senator Edward Johnson (Fonda).

The Ballad of Lefty Brown premiered at South by Southwest on March 11, 2017, and was theatrically released in the United States on December 15, 2017. Despite underperforming commercially, the film received critical acclaim, with particular praise for Pullman's performance.

== Plot ==
In 1889 Montana, a man stumbles out of a saloon after being shot in the back. A lawman, Edward Johnson, enters and directs his partner "Lefty" Brown to go around back. The killer jumps from a window, surprising Lefty, who fails to apprehend him. Ed comes out and subdues the man, admonishing Lefty for his mistake. Ed and Lefty immediately ride off and hang the man despite Lefty protesting the illegality of it, it is Ed's chosen method of exacting justice.

Shortly after arriving back at his ranch, Ed and his wife Laura prepare to move to Washington, Ed has recently been elected Senator. She has reservations about Ed's decision to leave Lefty in charge of the ranch, but Ed is sure of his loyalty. The next day, a ranch hand informs Ed and Lefty that three horses have been rustled and they ride off to check. When Ed and Lefty come to the spot, Ed is trying to bequeath his rifle to Lefty when he is suddenly shot in the head by an unknown sniper. Lefty survives and rides back to the ranch with Ed's body. Laura is distraught and blames Lefty for not protecting her husband and pays no mind when Lefty says he will avenge Ed. Lefty buries the rifle and rides off to begin his search.

Later, Governor James Bierce and Marshal Tom Harrah arrive to console Laura. They, Ed and Lefty used to ride together. Hearing that Lefty has gone off to find the man, Tom decides to find him to prevent him getting himself into trouble. On the trail, Lefty is set upon by a gunman who turns out to be a young man named Jeremiah Perkins. The boy asks to accompany Lefty, who initially refuses, but takes him along when he considers the boy's situation.

Tom finds Lefty and Jeremiah. Lefty is excited for him to join the posse, but he refuses, claiming he is only there to bring Lefty in. Disappointed that Tom won't help their friend Ed, they tie him up. After hearing his name and claiming he is a western hero from a novel he has, Jeremiah inspires Tom to join their quest. At a junction, Lefty leaves Tom and Jeremiah to chase a lead in which Tom has no faith, which leads Lefty directly to the killer's gang's hideout. The three regroup: Jeremiah will tend the horses, Lefty will go in back and Tom in front. Just as Tom is about to spring the trap, a man rides up who Tom recognizes as an employee of the governor's. A shootout ensues in which Jeremiah (who sneaked back) and the governor's man are shot, Tom kills several of the gang and Lefty apprehends the killer. Two of the gang escape.

Lefty tends to Jeremiah's wound, and as he begins to tell a heroic story about Edward, Jeremiah asks him to tell the story about how he got shot in his leg instead. At first hesitant and telling him it isn't that interesting, Lefty agrees. Lefty had pursued an outlaw when Edward was unavailable. They were ambushed on their stagecoach, and they ended up hiding in a box canyon outside of which the outlaws waited for them knowing they'd run out of food. Lefty couldn't wait any longer, and was shot as he also shot the outlaw, giving him his limp and the name "Lefty". Meanwhile, Tom interrogates the killer, named Frank Baines. They antagonize one another, with Tom noting that an employee of the governor's was sent to pay Frank, who killed Ed. Tom burns the money and gets drunk, leaving abruptly. Lefty and the injured Jeremiah are left to bring Frank in. Shortly after leaving, however, the escaped gang set upon them. Tom goes to see Jimmy and asks if he hired Frank to kill Ed. Though Jimmy denies it, he alludes to there being a difference of opinion between him and Ed, leaving Tom unconvinced.

Finding out the money is gone, the gang handcuff and strip Frank, Lefty, and Jeremiah and search for the money. In the confusion, Frank is able to kill both men but his pistol misfires as he tries to kill Lefty. Jeremiah gets a rifle from a dead man and kills Frank. Realizing the bad shape Jeremiah is in, Lefty rides back to the ranch, where the ranch hands attempt to lynch him. Laura intervenes but they tie him up; she reads him a telegraph from Jimmy claiming Lefty killed Ed. Realizing no one believes him, Lefty escapes and digs up Ed's rifle he buried before managing to secure medical supplies after forcing one of the pursuing ranch hands at gunpoint. He nurses Jeremiah back to health and laments how wrong he was that Jimmy was their friend. He says he's never gotten a single thing right in his whole life. Jeremiah reminds him that Lefty saved his life. After trying to decide what to do now, they go to town to confront Jimmy.

In town, Jimmy is hosting a memorial for Ed. Laura asks Jimmy not to appoint the senatorial runner-up to Ed's position, but Jimmy again alludes to a railroad deal Ed did not support. Jeremiah enters the building to spy and Lefty goes to the saloon to enlist Tom's help. Though Tom initially refuses to help, after knocking Lefty out, he interrupts Jimmy's eulogy and accuses him of killing Ed. Soldiers apprehend him, but Lefty comes to and starts shooting. Jimmy takes Laura inside and Lefty and Tom shoot their way through town; Tom is mortally wounded. In the hotel, Lefty confronts Jimmy, who reveals everything: Ed opposed a contract Jimmy proposed between Congress and the railroad, so Jimmy had a rustler kill him so he could appoint a senator who would support his deal to Ed's seat. Laura hears everything and Lefty knocks him out. Lefty says he'll take him to the judge, but Laura insists on dealing with this "Ed's way" - with an immediate hanging.

Not wanting Laura to be hanged herself for killing a governor without trial, Lefty hangs Jimmy knowing blame will be placed on himself. Lefty tells Jeremiah to stay and be raised by Laura and he rides off alone, concluding the Ballad of Lefty Brown.

== Cast ==
- Bill Pullman as "Lefty" Brown
- Kathy Baker as Laura Johnson
- Jim Caviezel as Governor James Bierce
- Joe Anderson as Frank Baines
- Tommy Flanagan as Tom Harrah
- Peter Fonda as Edward Johnson
- Lewis Pullman as Billy Kitchen
- Michael Spears as "Biscuit"
- Diego Josef as Jeremiah Perkins
- Adam O'Byrne as Thaddeus Crobley
- Joseph Lee Anderson as Oak

== Production ==
The project was initiated in September 2016, at which time the casting of Bill Pullman, Jim Caviezel, Peter Fonda, Kathy Baker and Tommy Flanagan was announced. Writer and director Jared Moshe and producer Neda Armian considered other locations where they could film the movie. After scouting many different states in the West, they chose Montana to film the movie, because of the authenticity that would bring to the project. More than a hundred locals were used as extras.

Principal photography began on September 8, 2016. Filming took place at Bannack State Park in Bannack, Montana, 25 miles southwest of Dillon. Other locations included Dillon, Montana, Virginia City, Montana and Ennis, Montana. Filming lasted for 20 days.

== Release ==
The film had its world premiere at South by Southwest on March 11, 2017. Shortly after, A24 and DirecTV Cinema acquired distribution rights to the film. The film had a subsequent wide release on December 15, 2017. Sold-out screenings of the film, near its shoot location in Whitehall, Montana, raised over $10,000 toward historical preservation efforts by the Jefferson Valley Museum.

The Blu-ray/DVD from Lionsgate features bonus content including the featurette "Designing the Look of ‘The Ballad of Lefty Brown" with director Jared Moshe and production designer Eve McCarney discussing the creative process, color palettes and set choices for the film. "Bringing the Truth to Myth: Inside of the Characters of The Ballad of Lefty Brown," features interviews with Moshe, Bill Pullman, Kathy Baker, Tommy Flanagan, and Jim Caviezel. The DVD also includes audio commentary with Moshe and Pullman.

== Reception ==
=== Critical response ===
On review aggregator website Rotten Tomatoes, the film holds an approval rating of 80% based on 30 reviews, and an average rating of 6.3/10. On Metacritic, the film has a weighted average score of 64 out of 100, based on 12 critics, indicating "generally favorable reviews".
