= The Killer and the Savage =

- Film poster
- Directed by: Hamid Nematollah
- Written by: Masoumeh Bayat; Hamid Nematollah
- Produced by: Hamid Nematollah
- Starring: Leila Hatami; Shahram Haghighatdoost; Amin Hayai; Setareh Eskandari
- Cinematography: Saeed Barati
- Edited by: Hayedeh Safiyari
- Music by: Christophe Rezai
- Release date: January 31, 2025 (IRFFNY)
- Country: Iran
- Language: Persian

The Killer and the Savage (Persian: قاتل و وحشی, romanized: Qātel Va Vahshi) is a 2025 Iranian crime thriller drama film written by Masoumeh Bayat and Hamid Nematollah, directed by Nematollah, and starring Leila Hatami, Shahram Haghighatdoost, Amin Hayai and Setareh Eskandari. It premiered at the 3rd Iranian Film Festival New York on January 31, 2025.

== Cast ==
- Leila Hatami as Ziba
- Shahram Haghighatdoost as Bijeh
- Amin Hayai
- Setareh Eskandari
- Shahram Ghaedi
- Sam Noori
- Ezatollah Ramezanifar
- Ali Alaee
- Yasamin Moini
