= Love is not Closed =

Iranian TV series

- Persian: عشق تعطیل نیست
- Genre: Sitcom; Rom-com
- Written by: Bijan Birang
- Directed by: Bijan Birang
- Starring: Mohammad Reza Golzar; Mahnaz Afshar; Shahram Haghighat Doost; Behnoosh Bakhtiari; Mehraneh Mahin Torabi; Xaniar Khosravi; Alireza Khamseh; Reza Naji; Fariba Naderi
- Composer: Ali Birang
- Country of origin: Iran
- Original language: Persian
- No. of seasons: 1
- No. of episodes: 26

Production
- Producers: Bijan Birang; Mohammad Shahbazi
- Production location: Tehran
- Cinematography: Mohammad Reza Kazemi
- Editor: Naser Fakhri
- Running time: 50 minutes

Original release
- Network: Home video
- Release: 26 January – 27 February 2014

Love is not Closed (Persian: عشق تعطیل نیست) is an Iranian sitcom Series directed by Bijan Birang. In February 2014, the series was cancelled after five episodes.

== Storyline ==
A young couple on the eve of their seventh wedding anniversary are faced with events that affect their lives and those around them...

== Cast ==
- Mohammad Reza Golzar
- Mahnaz Afshar
- Shahram Haghighat Doost
- Behnoosh Bakhtiari
- Mehraneh Mahin Torabi
- Xaniar Khosravi
- Alireza Khamseh
- Reza Naji
- Fariba Naderi
- Hadis Mir Amini
- Bahram Shahmohammadloo
- Sina Razani
- Maedeh Tahmasebi
- Hossein Erfanian
- Mahsa Erfanian
