= Shabnam Qolikhani =

Iranian actress, writer and director (born 1977)

- شبنم قلی‌خانی
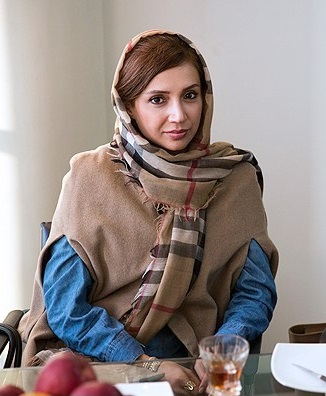
- Born: 9 November 1977 (age 48); Tehran, Iran
- Education: Islamic Azad University – Theater directing
- Occupations: Actress; TV director; Writer
- Years active: 1997–present

Shabnam Qolikhani (Persian: شبنم قلی‌خانی; born 9 November 1977) is an Iranian TV, and cinema actress.

== Career ==
Shabnam Qolikhani is an Iranian actress, director and acting coach. She started her career as an actor in 1997 by acting in Antigone and directed her first short film, Reality of a Street Seller, in 2004. She has written and directed several theatre and short films, including both documentary and feature films. She has been teaching in drama schools since 2004. She was a member of faculty in Tehran Azad University for several years, teaching principle of Acting and drama. She has Master of Art in Dramatic Art (theater directing) from Azad University, Tehran, Iran in 2003 and got her Bachelor of Art in Dramatic Arts (stage design) from Azad University, Tehran, Iran in 2000.

== Filmography ==
=== Television dramas ===
Year	Title	Role	Network	Notes
2005	The First Night of Calmness		IRIB TV3	Lead role
2006	We the Few People		IRIB TV3	Lead role
2006–2007	The Years of Snow and Pansy		IRIB TV3	Lead role
2009	The Ladder of the Sky	Veys	IRIB TV1	Lead role
2010	The Fifth Sun	Homa	IRIB TV3	Lead role
2011	Five Kilometres to Paradise	Aida	IRIB TV3	Lead role
2013	land of Mountains		IRIB TV3	Lead role
2016	Eight and a half Minutes	Yekta	IRIB TV2	Lead role
2020	There is a stranger with me	Minoo	IRIB TV2	
2020	Mannequin	Afsoon	Filimo	Lead role

=== Films ===
Year	Title	Role
1997	Saint Mary	Saint Mary
2002	Thirst	
2007	For My Sister	
2007	Soheil Star	
2009	The Memory	
2010	Parinaz	
2010	Tehran's Kid	
2010	Sweet Excitement	
2011	Stepchild	
2011	The Little Big Guy	
2012	The Last Thursday of the Month	

=== Theater ===
Year	Title	Role
1997	Antigone	
2010	Kaa	
2016	Play Reading whispers behind in second class citizens	
2016	Peeling	

== Awards ==
- The Acknowledgment Board of the Artists' Islamic Association for playing the role of "Saint Mary"
- The "Prominent Actress" Acknowledgment Sheet for playing of role of "Saint Mary", Jame-Jam World Network
- Acknowledgment Sheet for playing of role of "Saint Mary", Awarded by CEO of IRIB (Islamic Republic of Iran Broadcasting)
- The Best Actress's award, Golden Platform (a festival in Russia), 2005
- Iranian Student Film Festival Jury Appreciation for the production of the short film "Lonely Me", April 2006
- Certificate of Achievement from the 1st Iranian Consumption Optimization Film Festival, November 2010
- The "Best Actress", Jame-Jam TV Network Audiences' Choice Award, January 2004
- Certificate of Achievement from the 2nd Canada's Iranian Film Festival, September 2010
- The Acknowledgment Board from the IRIB board of directorsfor playing in "Ladder to Sky", a TV series
- The Acknowledgment Board from the IRIB III board of directorsfor playing in "Five Kilometers to Paradise", a TV series
