= Om Films =

American film production company

- Type: Private
- Industry: Film; Television
- Founded: 2006
- Founder: Niraj Bhatia; Daniel Burks
- Headquarters: Santa Monica, California, United States
- Products: Motion pictures
- Services: Film production

Om Films is an American film production company founded by executive producer Niraj Bhatia and producer/screenwriter Daniel Burks in 2006. Om concentrates on feature films, but also produces shorts, documentaries, and web series, including the Producers Guild of America award-winning documentary Beats, Rhymes, & Life: The Travels of A Tribe Called Quest; Mortified Nation!; and Caucus, a look into the 2012 GOP caucus in Iowa.

Om's films have premiered at Sundance Film Festival, SXSW, AFI Dallas Film Festival, AFI Docs (where Caucus was selected as the closing night film), and have screened at many more including the Los Angeles Film Festival (where Beats won the Audience Award), São Paulo International Film Festival (where Beats won Best International Documentary), and MIFF. Om's latest feature, Space Station 76 premiered at South by Southwest on March 8, 2014, where Sony Pictures secured all international rights. Om Films, Inc. is based in Santa Monica, CA.

== Filmography ==
| Title | Release date | Other Production Companies | Distribution | Runtime (minutes) |
|---|---|---|---|---|
| Placebo | 2006 | | | 28 min |
| Beats, Rhymes & Life: The Travels of a Tribe Called Quest | 2011 | Rival Pictures | Sony Pictures Classics | 97 min |
| Mortified Nation! | 2013 | Rival Pictures | | 85 min |
| Caucus | 2013 | Rival Pictures/Bonfire Films | | 104 min |
| The Starck Project | 2014 | Starck Doc/Lascaux Films/Eight 6 Eighty 6/M3 Films | | 90 min |
| Space Station 76 | 2014 | Rival Pictures | Sony Pictures | 93 min |
| Super Dark Times | 2017 | Higher Content | | 100 min |
| The Ballad of Lefty Brown | 2017 | Higher Content/ARMIAN Pictures | | 111 min |
| Darkness Visible | 2017 | British Film Institute/Higher Content | | POST |
| Stray Dolls | 2018 | | | |
| Ticket To Nashville | 2019 | | | |
