= The Snow on the Pines =

- Film poster
- Persian: برف روی کاج‌ها
- Directed by: Peyman Moaadi
- Written by: Peyman Moaadi
- Produced by: Jamal Sadatian
- Starring: Mahnaz Afshar; Vishka Asayesh; Saber Abar; Hasan Majoni; Anahita Afshar; Hossein Pakdel; Shirin Yazdanbakhsh; Xaniar Khosravi
- Cinematography: Mahmoud Kalari
- Edited by: Spideh Abdolvahab
- Music by: Karen Homayonfar
- Distributed by: Boshra Film
- Release date: February 2012 (Fajr Film Festival)
- Running time: 90 minutes
- Country: Iran
- Language: Persian
- Box office: +400,000 USD

The Snow on the Pines (Persian: برف روی کاج‌ها) is a 2012 Iranian black and white film written and directed by Iranian-American director and actor Peyman Moaadi.

The Snow on the pines is Moaadi's debut as a director. Also, it won a Crystal simorgh in the Fajr International Film Festival.

== Story ==
A woman who is a piano teacher deals with an important moment in her life and meets the dilemma of the decision. She has to choose in a common way, and/or find a different way.

== Awards ==
Crystal simorghs:

- Crystal simorgh; for the best film chosen by audiences. the 30th Fajr International Film Festival.
- Appreciation prize; for the best actress (Mahnaz Afshar) New look section. the 30th Fajr International Film Festival.

=== Awards for Moaadi ===
Year	Award	Category	Nominated work	Result
2013	Fajr International Film Festival	Audience Award for Best Film (with Jamal Sadatian)	The Snow on the Pines	Won
2013	Fajr International Film Festival	Best Director	The Snow on the Pines	Nominated
2014	Vesoul International Film Festival	Golden Wheel	The Snow on the Pines	Nominated
2014	Erbil International Film Festival	Best Director	The Snow on the Pines	Won
