= Jared Moshe =

American filmmaker

Jared Moshe is an American director, screenwriter and producer of independent films. He wrote and directed the films Dead Man's Burden (2012), The Ballad of Lefty Brown (2017) and Aporia (2023). He has also produced the features Destricted (2006), Kurt Cobain: About a Son (2006), Low and Behold (2007), Beautiful Losers (2008), Corman's World: Exploits of a Hollywood Rebel (2011), and Silver Tongues (2011).

== Early life ==
Moshe grew up in Chappaqua, New York. He is a graduate of Horace Greeley High School and Amherst College.

== Career ==
Prior to writing and directing, Moshe began his career as a producer on Kurt Cobain: About a Son, which premiered at the 2006 Toronto Film Festival and was nominated for an Independent Spirit Award. The film was produced under Moshe's Sidetrack Films banner, a financing and production company. Among the other films produced by Moshe at Sidetrack were Low and Behold, which premiered at the 2007 Sundance Film Festival, and Beautiful Losers, which played at the 2008 SXSW Film Festival and 2008 Locarno Film Festival.

Under his Stick! Pictures banner, Moshe executive produced Corman's World: Exploits of a Hollywood Rebel, a feature-length documentary exploring the career of Hollywood director Roger Corman. Interviewed celebrities include Robert De Niro, Quentin Tarantino, Jack Nicholson, Martin Scorsese, and Ron Howard, among others. The film was shown at the 2011 Sundance Film Festival and the 2011 Cannes Film Festival. It was distributed by A&E.

He also produced Silver Tongues, starring Lee Tergesen and Enid Graham. At the 2011 Slamdance Film Festival, Silver Tongues was given the Audience Award for Best Narrative Film, and was also nominated for an Independent Spirit Award. The movie was released by Virgil Films.

=== Film directing ===
Dead Man's Burden

Moshe made the transition to writer-director with the feature Western Dead Man's Burden (2012), starring Clare Bowen, David Call, and Barlow Jacobs. The film premiered at the 2012 Los Angeles Film Festival. It was released theatrically by Cinedigm. Paste Magazine named the film one of the "100 Best Westerns of All Time."

The Ballad of Lefty Brown

In 2017 Moshe wrote and directed The Ballad of Lefty Brown (2017), starring Bill Pullman, Kathy Baker, Jim Caviezel, Tommy Flanagan, and Peter Fonda in one of his final performances. The film premiered at the 2017 SXSW Film Festival, where it was acquired for distribution by A24.

Aporia

Moshe's third feature is the lo-fi, sci-fi drama Aporia (2023) starring Judy Greer, Edi Gathegi, Payman Maadi and Faithe Herman. The film was theatrically released by Well Go USA in 2023.
