= Nardebam-e Aseman =

- official poster
- Also known as: The Ladder of the Sky
- Genre: Science; Religion; Historical
- Written by: Hamed Anqa
- Directed by: Mohammad Hossein Latifi
- Starring: Vahid Jalilvand; Borzoo Arjmand; Hasan Pourshirazi; Shabnam Gholikhani; Vishka Asayesh; Farhad Ghaemian; Rahim Noroozi; Saeed Sadr; Mohammad Javad Omidi; Ahmad Allameh Dahr
- Composer: Karen Homayounfar
- Country of origin: Iran
- No. of episodes: 21

Production
- Producer: Mohsen Ali-Akbari
- Running time: 45 minutes
- Production company: IRIB

Original release
- Network: IRIB TV1
- Release: August 2009 – September 2009

Nardebām-e Asmān (Persian :نردبام آسمان, The Ladder of the Sky) is an Iranian TV series directed by Mohammad Hossein Latifi and produced in 2008. It is a historical and biographical series about the life and career of Iranian mathematician and astronomer Jamshid Kashani, also known as Jamshid Al-Kashi. It was broadcast during the month of Ramazan (August–September) of 2009 in Iran. The title of the Series is that of Kashani's astronomical treatise, with the Arabic title Soll'am-os-Samā' (literally meaning The ladder of the sky), which he completed on 1 March 1407 CE in Kashan.

== Plot ==
The Series narrates the life and the scientific works of the Iranian mathematician and astronomer Ghiyath al-Din Jamshid Kashani (1380–1429). It covers the entire life of Jamshid Kashani, from his birth in Kashan, until his death in Samarkand where he lived during the later part of his life, on the invitation of the Timurid ruler of Samarkand Ulugh Beg, as the designer, architect and director of the Samarkand observatory.

== Cast ==
- Vahid Jalil'vand as Jamshid Kashani
- Rahim Norouzi as Ulugh Beg
- Borzoo Arjmand as Moeen al-Din, son of Jamshid's sister and later a respected medical doctor in the Court of Ulugh Beg in Samarkand
- Shabnam Gholikhāni as Veys, Jamshid's wife
- Vishkā Āsāyesh as Āy Bānu, daughter of an alchemist and astrologer who later became an assistant to Jamshid in the Samarkand observatory
- Dāriush Kārdān as Masoud-e Tabib, Jamshid's father
- Hasan Pourshirazi as Safdar, Jamshid's spiritual teacher and guide
- Mohammad-Rezā Dāvoudnejād as The Sheriff

== Dialogues ==
Although the subject matter of the series is a historical one, almost all the dialogues throughout the series are in modern style and not strictly formal; even in the Court of Ulugh Beg courtly language is largely avoided. With this choice, the director has attempted to keep the series appealing to younger viewers who otherwise might consider the series as old-fashioned and greyish.

== See also ==
- List of Islamic films
