= Alireza Khamseh =

Iranian actor

- علیرضا خمسه
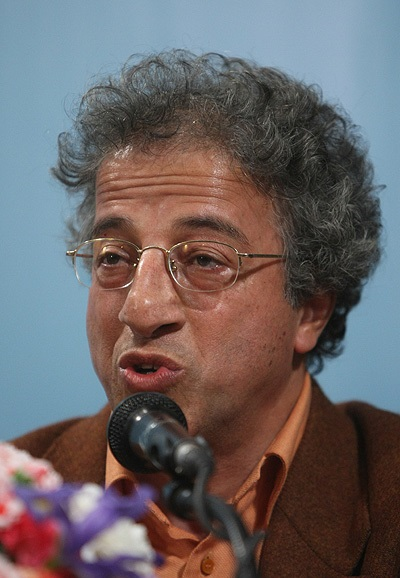
- Alireza Khamseh (2009)
- Born: Alireza Khamseh; January 29, 1953 (age 73); Tehran, Iran
- Education: Shahid Beheshti University; University of Paris
- Years active: 1975–present

Alireza Khamseh (Persian: علیرضا خمسه) is an Iranian cinema and television actor.

== Personal life ==
Khamseh boycotted the Fajr International Film Festival in protest of the government's crackdown of the 2025–2026 Iranian protests.

== Selected filmography ==
- Paytakht
- Rich and Poor
- Love is not Closed
- Man of Many Faces
- Once Upon a Time
- Standardized Patient
- Pickpockets Don't Go to Heaven
- Twenty
