= Jamal Sadatian =

Iranian film producer

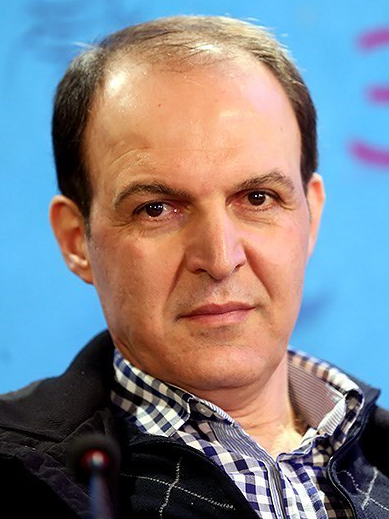

Seyed Jamal Sadatian (born 13 September 1956) is an Iranian film producer.

Sadatian established the Iranian motion picture company BoshraFilm in 1990.

Sadatian's films include The Color Purple (2005), Fireworks Wednesday (2006), Dayere Zangi (2008), Seven minutes to Fall (2010), Shabane Rooz (2011), The Snow on the Pines (2012), At the End of 8th Street (2012), Saye Roshan (2013), Azar, Shahdokht, Parviz, & Others (2014), A Persian Melody (2015) and Just 6.5 (2019).

== Awards ==
- Fajr Film Festival, Won Crystal Simorgh for Best Film, Best Actress, Critics Choice Awards, 2012. 'Snow on the Pines'
- Fajr Film Festival, Won Crystal Simorgh for Best film and Best actress in the first role. This film was also chosen 'best film' by audience and critics. 'Fireworks Wednesday'
- Fajr Film Festival, Won Crystal Simorgh for Best Director, Best Film, and Best Cinematography, 2004
- The Film 'The Colour Purple' received 4 Crystal Simorghs at Fajr Film Festival. One for Best Director, one for Best Film chosen by audience and one for Best Film chosen by judges at Fajr Film Festival. Lastly received an award for best Cinematography.
- The Film 'Azar, Shahdokht, Parviz and others' received two Crystal Simorghs for Best Screenplay and one for Best Film.
- Fajr Film Festival, Won Crystal Simorgh for Best Actor, and SG, 2010. 'Shabane Rouz'
- The Film '7 Minutes to Fall' received an honorary diploma for Best Director. Won 2 Simorgh awards for Best Actor in the first role and best SG effects.
