= Last Knights =

2015 film by Kazuaki Kiriya

- Theatrical release poster
- Directed by: Kazuaki Kiriya
- Written by: Michael Konyves; Dove Sussman
- Produced by: Luci Kim
- Starring: Clive Owen; Cliff Curtis; Aksel Hennie; Peyman Moaadi; Ayelet Zurer; Shohreh Aghdashloo; Ahn Sung-ki; Morgan Freeman
- Cinematography: Antonio Riestra
- Edited by: Mark Sanger
- Music by: Nicolas Neidhardt; Satnam Ramgotra; Martin Tillman
- Production companies: Grindstone Entertainment Group; Luka Productions; Czech Anglo Productions
- Distributed by: Lionsgate
- Release date: 3 April 2015
- Running time: 115 minutes
- Countries: United Kingdom; South Korea; Czech Republic
- Language: English
- Budget: $19.2 million
- Box office: $1.8 million

Last Knights is a 2015 action drama film directed by Kazuaki Kiriya and written by Michael Konyves and Dove Sussman, based loosely on (and Westernizing, for the most part) the Japanese legend of the forty-seven rōnin. The film, a joint production between the UK, Czech Republic and South Korea, stars Clive Owen and Morgan Freeman in the lead roles. It centres on a band of warriors who seek to avenge the loss of their master at the hands of a corrupt minister.

The film had its limited release on 3 April 2015, by Lionsgate and was released to video on demand on 30 June 2015. The film was dedicated to the memory of actor Dave Legeno, who died in 2014.

== Plot ==
Commander Raiden is surprised when aging nobleman Bartok makes him heir to his kingdom, a vassal to a corrupt empire. When minister Geza Mott beats Bartok for failing to provide an adequate bribe, Bartok retaliates and is put to trial where he denounces the loss of honour in the empire. Raiden is ordered to execute his master Bartok, whose clan is disbanded and estate divided. Geza has his warrior Ito watch Raiden lest he seek revenge.

A year passes and Geza, still fearful of Raiden, demands half his father-in-law Auguste's troops to protect construction of his newly fortified estate, and is promoted to First Councillor to the Emperor. The Emperor chides Geza for his paranoid behavior over Raiden who is now a drunkard. Raiden has sold his sword for drink, his wife has left him, and he is hated by his men for killing Bartok. Geza relaxes his watch on Raiden.

Raiden and the Bartok clan soldiers have sacrificed everything for the illusion of complete defeat, while preparing to avenge Bartok's death. Auguste, an old friend of Bartok, has made a pact to help Raiden in return for freeing his daughter from her abusive marriage to Geza. Raiden and his men infiltrate Geza's estate and face Geza's soldiers.

Raiden kills Ito in a duel; Ito's men surrender to him. Raiden breaks into Geza's bedroom and decapitates him as his men rescue Bartok's daughter. The Emperor's council realises the public view Geza's death as righteous and widely support the Bartok clan. They caution him against the risk of turning the people against the crown. Raiden asks that only he be executed for Geza's death.

The crown publicly acknowledges the righteousness of the Bartok clan, but reminds the crowd that killing a high council member is the same as an attack on the emperor and Raiden will be executed. Raiden charges Lieutenant Cortez to take control of the Bartok clan. In flashback, he apologises to Naomi. Raiden lowers his head with his eyes closed, and as the executioner draws his sword back, Raiden's eyes suddenly open wide as the screen goes to black.

== Cast ==
- Clive Owen as Raiden
- Morgan Freeman as Bartok
- Cliff Curtis as Lieutenant Cortez
- Aksel Hennie as Geza Mott
- Dave Legeno as Olaf
- Ayelet Zurer as Naomi
- Shohreh Aghdashloo as Maria
- Ahn Sung-ki as Auguste
- Tsuyoshi Ihara as Ito
- Park Si-yeon as Hannah
- Hannah Rose Caton as Lilly
- Giorgio Caputo as Slim Tully
- James Babson as Fat Jim
- Payman Maadi as Emperor
- Noah Silver as Gabriel
- Peter Hosking as Accountant

== Reception ==
On Rotten Tomatoes, the film has an approval rating of 16% based on 31 reviews, with an average rating of 3.3/10. The site's critical consensus reads: "As blandly unimaginative as its title, Last Knights revisits well-worn sword-and-sandal tropes without adding anything new—or interesting—to the genre." On Metacritic, the film has a weighted average score of 27 out of 100, based on 13 critics, indicating "generally unfavorable reviews".

Manohla Dargis of The New York Times said the film "proves as square and blandly manly as an old Prince Valiant comic strip."

Justin Chang of Variety wrote: "Last Knights is a fairly ludicrous mystery and a so-so action movie, but it's nonetheless been constructed with an earnest attention to detail that shouldn't be taken for granted."

Max Nicholson of IGN awarded it a score of 5.8 out of 10, saying "Last Knights doesn't quite rise to the challenge, despite good leads in Clive Owen and Morgan Freeman."

Tim Grierson of Screen International described the film as a conventional medieval action drama that relies heavily on familiar genre tropes such as themes of honor and revenge. While Clive Owen's performance as Raiden was praised for its gravity and believability, the film overall was criticized as generic and predictable.

Claudia Puig of USA Today criticized Last Knights as a sluggish and overlong drama that squandered the talents of its strong ensemble cast. She faulted the film for its stilted dialogue, weak pacing, and unconvincing special effects, concluding that it lacked energy or originality.
