= Thirst (2002 film) =

- عطش
- Directed by: Mohammad Hossein Farahbakhsh
- Written by: Payman Maadi
- Produced by: Abdollah AliKhani
- Starring: Bahram Radan; Fariborz Arabnia; Shahram Haghighat Doost; Shabnam Gholikhani; Saghar Azizi; Manouchehr Sadeghpour; Tayeb Sherafati
- Cinematography: Faraj Heidari
- Edited by: Kamran Ghadakchian
- Music by: Keyvan Jahanshahi
- Distributed by: Pouya Film
- Release date: 18 June 2002
- Running time: 92 minutes
- Country: Iran
- Language: Persian

Thirst (Persian: عطش; Atash) is a 2002 Iranian crime-drama film directed by Mohammad Hossein Farahbakhsh.

== Plot ==
The story of the film is about Nader who is released from prison and to execute a plan to steal a gold shop, he found two experts in opening the safe and electronics, and this group of three executes their plan skillfully, but…

== Cast ==
- Bahram Radan
- Fariborz Arabnia
- Shahram Haghighat Doost
- Shabnam Gholikhani
