= Bomb: A Love Story =

Bomb: A Love story
- Film poster
- Directed by: Peyman Moadi
- Written by: Peyman Moadi
- Produced by: Ehsan Rasoulof; Peyman Moadi
- Starring: Peyman Moadi; Leila Hatami; Habib Rezaei; Mahmoud Kalari
- Cinematography: Mahmoud Kalari
- Edited by: Bahram Dehghani
- Music by: Eleni Karaindrou
- Release date: February 2018 (Fajr)
- Running time: 95 minutes
- Country: Iran
- Language: Persian

Bomb: A Love Story (Persian: بمب؛ یک عاشقانه) is a 2018 Iranian war drama film written and directed by Peyman Moadi. Cinematography was by Mahmoud Kalari. Leila Hatami, Peyman Moadi, Siamak Ansari, Habib Rezaei and Mahmoud Kalari starred. The film premiered at the 2018 Fajr International Film Festival.

== Plot ==
In the middle of the Iran–Iraq War and at the height of the bombing of Tehran, days pass with fear and dread. But love and affection and life and hope forget the tangible fear of death; The dead are repeated in the words of the living. Death is an absolute question and love is a recurring ambiguity. Bomb: A Love Story deals with the hopeful course of life, not the absolute blackness of death.

== Cast ==
- Peyman Moadi
- Leila Hatami
- Siamak Ansari
- Habib Rezaei
- Hojjat Hassanpour
- Mahmoud Kalari

== Music ==
Music for the film was written by Eleni Karaindrou. A recording, with Karaindrou playing the piano, was released on the ECM New Series.
