= Aporia (film) =

2023 film by Jared Moshe

- Theatrical release poster
- Directed by: Jared Moshe
- Written by: Jared Moshe
- Produced by: Neda Armian; T. Justin Ross
- Starring: Judy Greer; Edi Gathegi; Payman Maadi; Faithe Herman; Whitney Morgan Cox; Veda Cienfuegos
- Cinematography: Nicholas Bupp
- Edited by: Marshall Granger
- Music by: H. Scott Salinas
- Distributed by: Well Go USA Entertainment
- Release date: August 11, 2023 (United States)
- Running time: 104 minutes
- Country: United States
- Language: English
- Box office: $21,600

Aporia is a 2023 science fiction film written and directed by Jared Moshe, starring Judy Greer as a woman who tries to change the past where her husband was killed by a drunk driver.

After its worldwide premiere at the 2023 Fantasia International Film Festival, it had a limited theatrical run beginning August 11, 2023. The film was released on DVD on September 12.

== Plot ==
Eight months after the death of her husband Malcolm, Sophie Rice is suffering from severe depression and a strained relationship with her daughter Riley. She is also frustrated that Darby Brinkley, the drunk driver who hit and killed Malcolm, has not suffered any legal repercussions for the death. Malcolm's best friend, physicist Jabir Karim, shows Sophie a machine that he and Malcolm built at his house while attempting to create a time machine. Jabir explains that the machine is capable of sending a subatomic particle to a designated space and time in the past, which will kill any living being that it appears within. While the machine is not yet powerful enough to achieve his ultimate goal, to kill the man responsible for the death of his family ten years prior, he tells Sophie that they can use it to kill Darby at a time before the accident, thus preventing Malcolm's death. While initially incredulous, Sophie eventually agrees to the idea and the two activate the machine together. They are subsequently delighted to discover that it worked, creating a new timeline where Malcolm never died. Only Sophie and Jabir remember the previous timeline, and Jabir deduces that those present in the room when the machine is activated retain their memories of the unaltered timeline.

While Sophie is initially overjoyed at having Malcolm back, she begins to be disturbed by many minor, unanticipated changes to the timeline that also occurred as a result of killing Darby, and eventually admits to Malcolm what she and Jabir did to save him. While Jabir and Malcolm continue to improve the machine, the three of them debate the ethics of using it, and what they should do. Jabir realizes that he cannot use it to save his family as planned, as doing so would create a timeline where the machine was never built and thus negate any of the other changes made using it. He instead advocates using it to erase mass murders from history by preemptively killing the perpetrators. The other two are wary of this idea, with Sophie being particularly worried about the unintended consequences that could result from further changes to the past.

Sophie learns that Darby's widow, Kara, and her young daughter, Aggie, are destitute in the current timeline due to Darby's unexpected death. Feeling guilty that she altered their lives for the worse, she befriends them and attempts to help them as best she can. After learning that Aggie has multiple sclerosis, and that Kara is now struggling to pay for her medical care, Sophie, Malcolm, and Jabir resolve to use the machine to help them. Malcolm proposes that they kill the con man that had tricked Kara into losing her bakery years in the past. The three agree to this plan, and after using the machine, confirm that Kara and Aggie are now running a successful bakery together. Shortly after this, however, Malcolm and Sophie are horrified to discover that this change to the timeline has resulted in their daughter no longer existing, with them now having a son instead. Sophie realizes that as she and Malcolm have no memories from this new timeline, it would be unfair for their son to be raised by parents who do not know him.

Sophie, Malcolm, and Jabir eventually agree that Jabir should use the machine to save his family, in order to create a new timeline in which the machine was never created. By activating the machine alone, only he would retain his memories, and the other two would have their memories altered to fit the new timeline. While they don't know what the new timeline will be like, Sophie and Malcolm express their hopes to each other that they will both be alive and with their daughter as Jabir activates the machine.

In the new timeline, Sophie arrives home from work and enters the front door of her house, as the film ends without revealing what is inside.

== Cast ==
- Judy Greer as Sophie Rice
- Edi Gathegi as Malcolm Rice
- Payman Maadi as Jabir Karim
- Faithe Herman as Riley Rice (Female)
- Whitney Morgan Cox as Kara Brinkley
- Veda Cienfuegos as Aggie Brinkley
- Elohim Nycalove as Riley Rice (Male)
- Adam O'Byrne as Darby Brinkley

== Reception ==
Aporia received mostly positive reviews, with the performances of the cast given particular praise. Writing for the Los Angeles Times, Robert Abele described it as "mix of rough-around-the-edges logic and heartfelt suspense, it likably reclaims sci-fi’s speculative, moral heft from the province of shiny, plastic world-ending epics, dropping it squarely onto, as Casablanca memorably put it, "the problems of three little people". Writing for Variety, reviewer Dennis Harvey said "the concept provides enough narrative drive to prevent Aporia from settling into mere depressing kitchen-sink realism. While it may not stress fear or fancy as much as most such comparable tales, this quasi-scientific fiction nonetheless easily holds us in suspense, wondering just where so much monkeying with the time-space continuum will lead." Jeannette Catsoulis of The New York Times gave a more mixed review, describing it as "a deeply silly time-travel weepie buoyed solely by the soapy warmth of its performances."

The film was nominated at the 51st Saturn Awards for the Saturn Award for Best Independent Film.
