= The Fifth Sun (TV series) =

2010 TV series

- Persian: پنجمین خورشید
- Genre: Drama Sci-Fi
- Written by: Alireza Afkhami; Sajjad Abolhassani
- Directed by: Alireza Afkhami
- Starring: Hamid Goudarzi; Shabnam Gholikhani; Maryam Kavyani; Shahram Ghaedi; Anoushirvan Arjmand; Mahvash Sabrkon
- Theme music composer: Ali Reza Eftekhari
- Composer: Pirooz Arjmand
- Country of origin: Iran
- Original language: Persian
- No. of seasons: 1
- No. of episodes: 26

Production
- Producer: Davood Hashemi
- Production location: Tehran
- Cinematography: Hassan Ali Assadi
- Editors: Reza Soorani; Afsaneh Afkhami
- Running time: 45 minutes

Original release
- Release: 16 December 2010 – 15 January 2011

The Fifth Sun (Persian: پنجمین خورشید) is an Iranian Drama, Sci-Fi series. The series is directed by Alireza Afkhami. The series has also been aired on iFilm since November 2021.

== Storyline ==
A student of mechanics, Mohsen (Hamid Goudarzi) and his close friend Homayoun (Shahram Ghaedi) are living in poor economic conditions in 1985. They find an Inscription that can travel in time, and Mohsen travels with Antique for 24 years. Mohsen, who encounters new and far-fetched phenomena and there he falls in love with a girl named Homa (Shabnam Gholikhani). Other things happen to Mohsen that he is forced to go back to 1985 and...

== Cast ==
- Hamid Goudarzi
- Shabnam Gholikhani
- Maryam Kavyani
- Shahram Ghaedi
- Anoushirvan Arjmand
- Mahvash Sabrkon
- Mehdi Solooki
- Pendar Akbari
- Kamiyar Mohebi
- Niloufar hooshmand
- Asgar Ghods
- Hassan Najafi
- Nasim Geramipour
- Mohammad Matin Heidarinia
- Nabioallah Pirhadi
- Reza Tavakoli
- Ali Mirzaei
