= Sullam al-Sama' =

1407 book by Jamshid Kashani

Sullam al-sama'
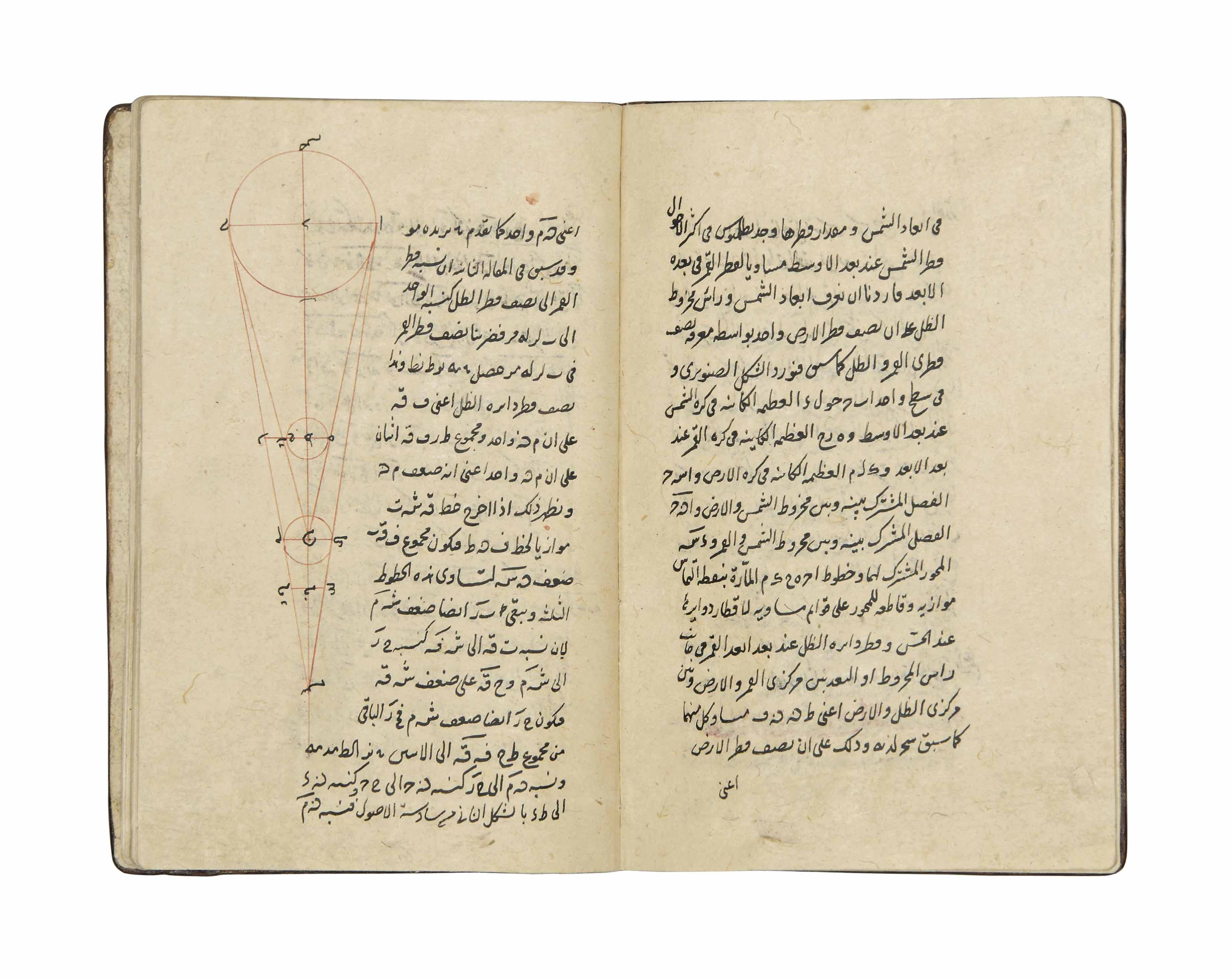
- Manuscript of al-Kashi's al-Risala al-Kamaliya. Copy created in Safavid Iran, dated 26 June 1520
- Author: Jamshid Kashani
- Original title: سُلَم السَماء
- Language: Arabic
- Subject: Astronomy
- Publication date: 1407; 619 years ago
- Publication place: Iran

Sullam al-Sama', also known as Resaleh-ye Kamaliyyeh (Arabic*: سُلَم السماء, Transliterated as Sǒllam os-Samā'), meaning "The Ladder of the Sky" or "The Stairway of Heaven", is an astronomical treatise written by the Persian mathematician and astronomer Jamshid Kashani in 1407 about the determination of the distance and size of heavenly bodies such as the Earth, the Moon and the Sun.

== The text ==
Kashani finished writing the book on 1 March 1407. He mentioned in the preface of another book of his, Meftah al-Hesab (lit. "The Key of Arithmetic"), that: "I studied all books on astronomy that the scientists had written before me and I realized that they had many difficulties and disagreements about the determination of the size or distance of the astronomical objects like Mercury or Venus to the Sun. So I decided to write this book and I named it Sullam al-sama' to be a guide for the wise."

== Series adaptation ==
The book shares its title with a TV series about Kashani produced in Iran in 2008.
