= Afsar Asadi =

Iranian actress and make-up artist

- افسر اسدی
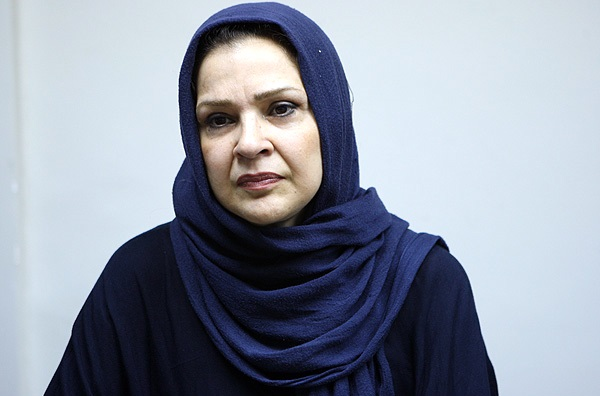
- Born: 16 January 1958 (age 68); Meyaneh, Iran
- Education: University of Tehran
- Occupations: Actress, make-up artist
- Spouse: Asghar Hemmat
- Children: Hamoon Hemmat; Ghazal Hemmat

Afsar Asadi (Persian: افسر اسدی; born 16 January 1958) is an Iranian actress and make-up artist.

== Filmography ==
=== As an actress ===
- Movies

Year	Name	Translation in English
1990	Obour Az Ghobar	Passing Through the Dust
1990	Zaman-e Az Dast Rafteh	The lost time
1990	Raz-e khanjar	Secret of the Dagger
1995	Sarboland	Honorable
1995	Rusari Abi	The Blue Veiled
1999	Tehran Rouzegar-e No	Tehran, New Era
2002	Koudakaneh	Childlike
2005	Asb	The Horse
2008	Yek Vajab Az Aseman	A Span of Heaven
2011	12 Sandali	The Twelve Seats
2012	Gahvarei Baraye Madar	A Cradle for Mother
2015	Jameh Daran	A Persian Melody
2017	Reza	Reza

- TV Series

Year	Name	Translation in English
1978	Hezar dastan	Nightingale
1991	Vazir Mokhtar	Minister Plenipotentiary

=== As a make-up artist ===
Year	Name	Translation in English
1990	Parvaz-e Panjom-e Zhoan	The Fifth Flight in June

== Awards ==
- Best Supporting Actress, Fajr Film Festival, for Obour Az Ghobar (1990)
- Nominated for Best Supporting Actress, Fajr Film Festival, for Rousari-e Aabi (1995)

== See also ==
- Iranian women
- Iranian cinema
- List of famous Persian women
- Persian women's movement
- Fajr International Film Festival
