= Kamran Qadakchian =

- کامران قدکچیان
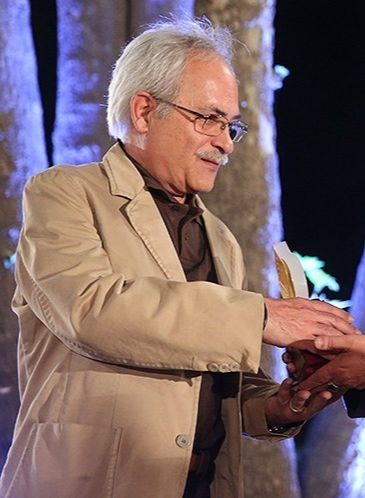
- Born: January 3, 1948 (age 78); Tehran, Iran
- Occupations: Film director; Film editor
- Father: Ahmad Qadakchian

Kamran Ghadakchian (Persian: کامران قدکچیان; born January 3, 1948 in Tehran, Iran) is a film director and editor. He is the son of actor Ahmad Qadakchian.

== Selected filmography ==
- Sorcerer, 1972
- The Song of Tehran, 1992
- Wounded, 1997
- Thirst, 2002
- Thirteen Cats on the Hot Gabled Roof, 2004
