= A Persian Melody =

- Persian: جامه‌دران
- Directed by: Hamid-Reza Ghotbi
- Written by: Nahid Tabatabaei; Hamid-Reza Ghotbi
- Produced by: Jamal Sadatian
- Starring: Mahtab Keramati; Mostafa Zamani; Baran Kosari; Pegah Ahangarani; Elham Nami; Afsar Asadi; Jamal Ejlali
- Cinematography: Ali-Mohammad Ghasemi
- Edited by: Hassan Hassandoost
- Music by: Saeed Ansari
- Distributed by: Boshra Film
- Release date: 2 February 2015
- Running time: 100 minutes
- Country: Iran
- Language: Persian

A Persian Melody (Persian: جامه‌دران, "Jāme-darān") is a 2015 Iranian drama film directed by Hamid-Reza Ghotbi.

== Plot ==
"Shirin" (Mahtab Keramati) returns to Iran after many years to attend the funeral of her deceased father. But, in this ceremony, she realizes that secrets about her father are hidden from her that have roots in the past... .

== Cast ==
- Mahtab Keramati as Shirin
- Mostafa Zamani as Mahmud
- Baran Kosari as Gohar
- Pegah Ahangarani as Mahlagha
- Elham Nami
- Afsar Asadi as Mahlagha
- Jamal Ejlali
- Farzaneh Neshat Khah
- Maryam Boubani
- Shirin Kazemi
- Maryam Rostami
- Fatemeh Mortazi
- Siavash Cheraghi Pour as Savash
- Farzam as Ali Reza

== Awards and nominations ==
Year	Award	Category	Recipient	Result
2015	33rd Fajr International Film Festival	Best Film	Jamal Sadatian	Nominated
2015	33rd Fajr International Film Festival	Best Director	Hamid Reza Ghotbi	Nominated
2015	33rd Fajr International Film Festival	Best screenplay	Nahid Tabatabaei - Hamid Reza Ghotbi	Won
