= Predicament (2008 film) =

- Persian: مخمصه
- Directed by: Mohammad Ali Sadjadi
- Written by: Mohammad Ali Sadjadi
- Produced by: Manoochehr Shahsavari
- Starring: Masoud Rayegan; Mahdi Pakdel; Shahram Haghighat Doost; Laleh Eskandari; Farhad Ghaemian; Soraya Ghasemi; Maryam Kavyani
- Cinematography: Hossein Maleki
- Edited by: Mohammad Ali Sadjadi
- Music by: Saeed Shahram
- Release date: 24 June 2008
- Running time: 100 minutes
- Country: Iran
- Language: Persian

Predicament (Persian: مخمصه) is a 2008 Iranian Crime-drama film written and directed by Mohammad Ali Sadjadi.

== Plot ==
Capt. Reza Shemirani (Mahdi Pakdel) and his colleagues are involved in unusual robberies. Amir Delavari (Masoud Rayegan) is a thief who has a special skill in theft and special relations with his subordinates. One of the Delavari accomplices is injured during the robbery and...

== Cast ==
- Masoud Rayegan
- Mahdi Pakdel
- Shahram Haghighat Doost
- Laleh Eskandari
- Farhad Ghaemian
- Soraya Ghasemi
- Maryam Kavyani
- Farhad Besharati
- Amir Reza Delavari
- Masoumeh Mirhosseini
- Mehdi Mayamei
- Shiva Khosromehr
- Pooya Delavari
- Hamid Safayi
