= Payman Maadi =

Iranian-American actor (born 1970)

Peyman Maādi
- پیمان معادی
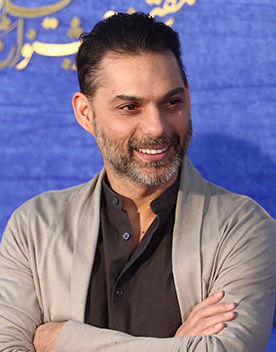
- Maadi at the 2019 Fajr Film Festival
- Born: July 9, 1970 (age 56); New York City, U.S.
- Citizenship: United States; Iran
- Occupations: Actor; screenwriter; director
- Years active: 2000–present
- Spouse: Faranak Qavanlou
- Children: 2

Payman Maadi (Persian: پیمان معادی; born July 9, 1970), also known as Peyman Moadi, is an Iranian-American actor, screenwriter, and director. He is best known for starring in the films A Separation (2011) and About Elly (2009) by Iranian Academy Award-winning director Asghar Farhadi, Last Knights (2015) and the independent drama film Camp X-Ray (2014). For his role in A Separation, he won the Silver Bear for Best Actor at the 61st Berlin International Film Festival (2011).

== Early life ==
Maadi was born in New York City to Iranian parents. When he was 5 years old, his father, an attorney, decided to move back to Iran. He graduated from the Islamic Azad University, Karaj Branch with a degree in metallurgical engineering. Maadi later decided to become a screenwriter.

== Career ==
Maadi started his film career as a screenwriter with the film Swan Song in 2000. He later wrote several renowned Iranian films. He began his acting career in Asghar Farhadi's film About Elly (2009), continuing his working relationship with the director in the film A Separation, which was released to widespread critical acclaim.

Two years later, he received the Silver Bear award for Best Actor in Leading Role at the Berlin International Film Festival for his performance as Nader in Farhadi's A Separation (2011). He was seen in the indie drama Camp X-Ray, which was accepted into the U.S. Dramatic Competition section of the 2014 Sundance Film Festival and was released October 17, 2014. Maadi also appeared in the HBO television series The Night Of. In 2014 he was a jury member at the 17th Shanghai International Film Festival.

He won the Crystal Simorgh for his role in Walnut Tree (2020) at the Fajr Film Festival. The film is about a father who has to bear the burden of his children's grief under the terrible shadow of war.

== Personal life ==
Maadi divides his time between Tehran and Los Angeles. He owns a watch gallery in Tehran. He identifies as Muslim.

== Filmography ==
=== Film ===
Year	Title	Role	Director	Notes	Ref(s)
2000	Swan Song		Saeed Asadi	As writer	
2002	Thirst		Mohammad Hossein Farahbakhsh	As writer, costume designer	
2004	Coma		Arash Moayerian	As writer	
2006	Cafe Setareh		Saman Moghaddam	As writer	
2006	Wedding Dinner		Ebrahim Vahidzadeh	As writer, director advisor	
2007	Lipstick		Payman Maadi	Short film; also as writer	
2009	About Elly	Payman	Asghar Farhadi		
2011	A Separation	Nader	Asghar Farhadi		
2011	Mourning	Masoud (voice)	Morteza Farshbaf		
2012	The Snow on the Pines		Payman Maadi	Also as writer	
2014	Camp X-Ray	Ali Amir	Peter Sattler		
2014	Tales	Taxi Driver	Rakhshan Banietemad		
2014	Melbourne	Amir	Nima Javidi		
2015	Last Knights	Emperor	Kazuaki Kiriya		
2016	13 Hours: The Secret Soldiers of Benghazi	Amahl	Michael Bay		
2016	Life and a Day	Morteza	Saeed Roustaee		
2016	Window Horses	Payman	Ann Marie Fleming	Voice	
2018	Bomb: A Love Story	Iraj Zokayi	Payman Maadi	Also as writer	
2018	Pig	Himself	Mani Haghighi		
2019	Suddenly a Tree	Farhad	Safi Yazdanian		
2019	Just 6.5	Samad Majidi	Saeed Roustaee		
2019	6 Underground	Murat Alimov	Michael Bay		
2020	Walnut Tree	Qader Molanpour	Mohammad Hossein Mahdavian		
2020	Night Shift	Asomidin Tohirov	Anne Fontaine		
2022	Leila's Brothers	Manouchehr Jourablou	Saeed Roustaee		
2023	Opponent	Iman	Milad Alami		
2023	Aporia	Jabir	Jared Moshe		
2023	Parfum		Dylan Gee	Short film	
2024	Hard Shell		Majid Reza Mostafavi		
2025	Woman and Child	Hamid	Saeed Roustaee		
2026	Crime 101	Sammy Kassem	Bart Layton		

=== Television ===
Year	Title	Role	Director	Network	Notes	Ref(s)
2016	The Night Of	Salim Khan	Steven Zaillian, James Marsh	HBO	Miniseries, 8 episodes	
2020	Westworld	Elliot	Jonathan Nolan, Frederick E.O. Toye	HBO	3 episodes	
2024	Viper of Tehran	Arman Bayani	Saman Moghaddam	Filmnet	Main role; 14 episodes, also as writer	
2025	Azaazil	Behrouz Sharifi	Hassan Fathi	Namava	Main role	
TBA	Caviar		Payman Maadi	Filimo	Also writer	

== Awards and nominations ==
Award	Year	Category	Nominated work	Result	Ref(s)
Asia Pacific Screen Awards	2011	Best Performance by an Actor	A Separation	Nominated	
Asia Pacific Screen Awards	2018	Best Screenplay	Bomb: A Love Story	Nominated	
Berlin International Film Festival	2011	Silver Bear for Best Actor	A Separation	Won	
Fajr Film Festival	2012	Best First Director	The Snow on the Pines	Nominated	
Fajr Film Festival	2012	Best First Screenplay	The Snow on the Pines	Nominated	
Fajr Film Festival	2012	Audience Choice of Best Film	The Snow on the Pines	Won	
Fajr Film Festival	2016	Best Actor in a Leading Role	Life and a Day	Nominated	
Fajr Film Festival	2018	Best Film	Bomb: A Love Story	Nominated	
Fajr Film Festival	2018	Best Screenplay	Bomb: A Love Story	Nominated	
Fajr Film Festival	2018	Special Jury Prize	Bomb: A Love Story	Won	
Fajr Film Festival	2019	Best Actor in a Leading Role	Just 6.5	Nominated	
Fajr Film Festival	2020	Best Actor in a Leading Role	Walnut Tree	Won	
Hafez Awards	2014	Best Screenplay – Motion Picture	The Snow on the Pines	Nominated	
Hafez Awards	2016	Best Actor – Motion Picture	Life and a Day	Nominated	
Hafez Awards	2019	Best Screenplay – Motion Picture	Bomb: A Love Story	Nominated	
Hafez Awards	2019	Best Motion Picture	Bomb: A Love Story	Nominated	
Hafez Awards	2019	Best Actor – Motion Picture	Just 6.5	Won	
Hafez Awards	2021	Best Actor – Motion Picture	Walnut Tree	Won	
Hafez Awards	2024	Best Actor – Television Series Drama	Viper of Tehran	Nominated	
Hafez Awards	2024	Best Screenplay – Television Series	Viper of Tehran	Nominated	
International Bosphorus Film Festival	2018	Best International Director	Bomb: A Love Story	Won	
International Cinephile Society	2012	Best Actor	A Separation	Runner-up	
International Online Cinema Awards	2015	Best Supporting Actor	About Elly	Nominated	
Iran Cinema Celebration	2011	Best Actor in a Leading Role	A Separation	Nominated	
Iran Cinema Celebration	2014	Best Screenplay	The Snow on the Pines	Nominated	
Iran Cinema Celebration	2014	Best New Director	The Snow on the Pines	Nominated	
Iran Cinema Celebration	2015	Best Actor in a Supporting Role	Tales	Nominated	
Iran Cinema Celebration	2016	Best Actor in a Leading Role	Life and a Day	Won	
Iran Cinema Celebration	2019	Best Actor in a Leading Role	Just 6.5	Nominated	
Iran's Film Critics and Writers Association	2009	Best Actor in a Supporting Role	About Elly	Nominated	
Iran's Film Critics and Writers Association	2011	Best Actor in a Leading Role	A Separation	Won	
Iran's Film Critics and Writers Association	2012	Best Director	The Snow on the Lines	Nominated	
Iran's Film Critics and Writers Association	2012	Best Creativity and Talent (first filmmakers)	The Snow on the Lines	Nominated	
Iran's Film Critics and Writers Association	2014	Best Actor in a Supporting Role	Tales	Nominated	
Iran's Film Critics and Writers Association	2016	Best Actor in a Leading Role	Life and a Day	Won	
Iran's Film Critics and Writers Association	2018	Best Film	Bomb: A Love Story	Nominated	
Iran's Film Critics and Writers Association	2018	Best Director	Bomb: A Love Story	Nominated	
Iran's Film Critics and Writers Association	2018	Best Screenplay	Bomb: A Love Story	Nominated	
Iran's Film Critics and Writers Association	2022	Best Actor in a Leading Role	Walnut Tree	Nominated	
Stockholm International Film Festival	2019	Achievement Award	–	Won	
Vesoul International Film Festival	2014	Golden Wheel	The Snow on the Pines	Nominated	
Village Voice Film Poll	2011	Best Actor	A Separation	Fourth Place	
