= Mohammad Ali Sajjadi =

Mohammad Ali Sajjadi محمدعلی سجادی
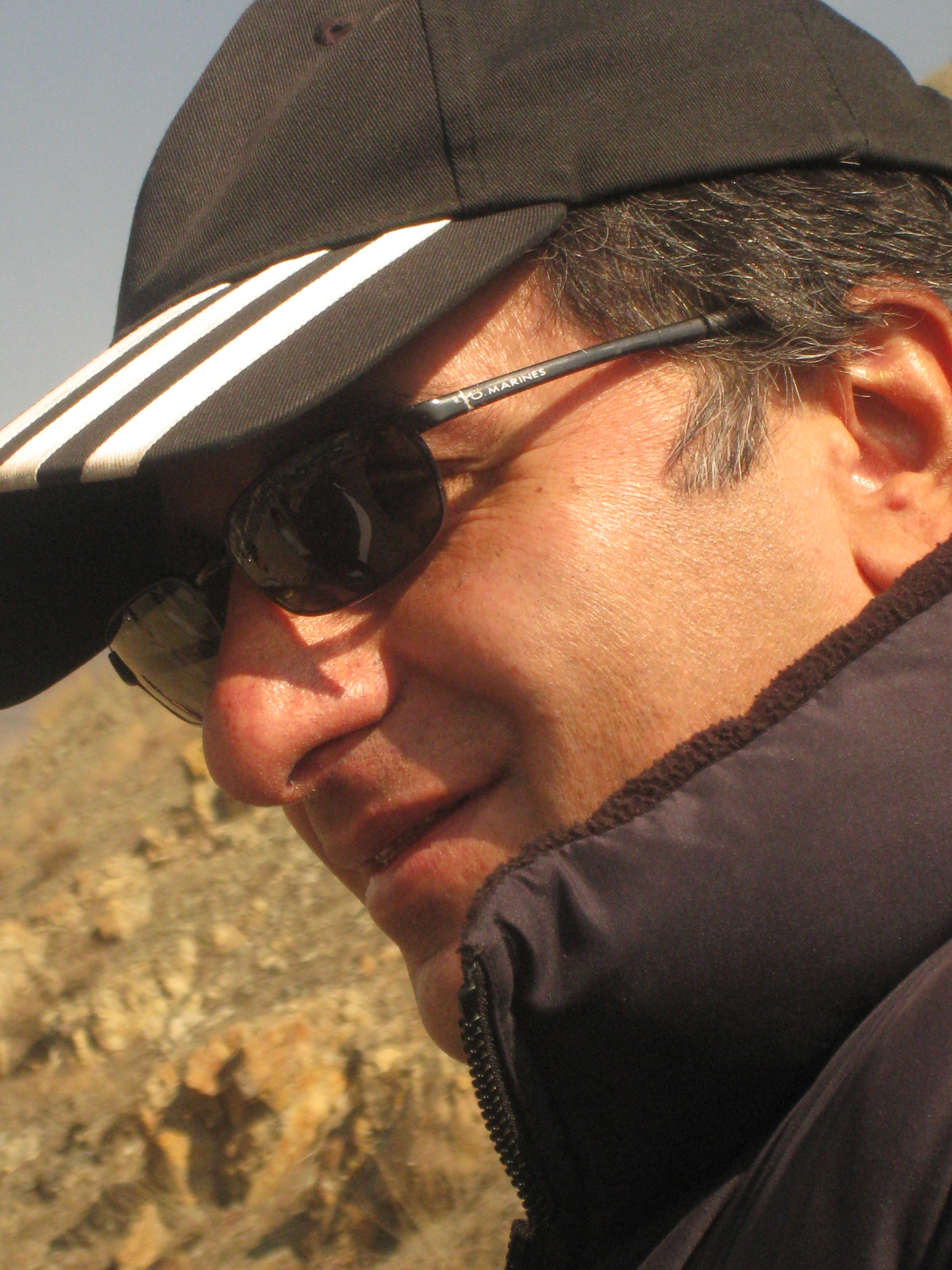
- Born: 1957 (age 68–69); Amol, Iran
- Occupations: Film director, screenwriter, editor, producer, production designer

Mohammad Ali Sajjadi (Persian: محمدعلی سجادی; born 1957, Amol), is an Iranian film director, screenwriter, editor, producer, production designer and writer.

== Filmography ==
Year	Film	Credited as					Notes
Year	Film	Director	Producer	Writer	Editor	Set Designer	Notes
2019	Soodabeh	Yes	Yes	Yes	Yes	No	
2018	Divorce me for the sake of cats	Yes	No	Yes	Yes	No	
2015	Tamrin Baray e Ejra	Yes	No	No	No	No	
2014	Mazar-i-Sharif	No	No	No	Yes	No	
2008	Predicament	Yes	No	Yes	Yes	No	
2006	Pāpital (Hedera helix)	No	No	No	Yes	No	
2004	Tardast (The Juggler)	Yes	Yes	Yes	Yes	No	
2004	Shurideh (Deranged)	Yes	No	Yes	Yes	Yes	
2003	Jenayat (The Crime)	Yes	No	Yes	Yes	No	
2002	Molaghat ba Tooti (Meeting Tooti)	No	No	No	Yes	No	
2002	Roya ye Javani (The dreams of Youth)	No	No	No	Yes	No	
2001	Asiri (Ethereal)	Yes	Yes	Yes	Yes	No	
2000	Rang e Shab (The Colour of Night)	Yes	No	Yes	Yes	Yes	
2000	Ali and Danny	No	No	No	Yes	No	
1999	Shifteh (Lovesick)	Yes	No	Yes	Yes	Yes	
1998	Bazigar (The Actor)	Yes	No	Yes	Yes	No	
1997	Mohreh (The Bead)	Yes	Yes	Yes	Yes	No	
1991	Afsane ye mah palang (Panther Moon Legend)	Yes	Yes	Yes	Yes	Yes	
1989	Gozal	Yes	Yes	Yes	Yes	Yes	
1988	Mesl e Bad (Like the Wind)	Yes	Yes	Yes	Yes	No	
1987	Gomshodegan (Lost)	Yes	No	Yes	Yes	No	
1985	Jedal (Controversy)	Yes	No	Yes	No	Yes	
1984	Ganj (The Treasure)	Yes	No	Yes	Yes	No	
1983	Bazjuei yek jenayat (Interrogation of a Crime)	Yes	No	Yes	No	No	
1981	Jaddeh (The Road)	Yes	No	Yes	No	No	
