= Bijan Birang =

Iranian film director (born 1950)

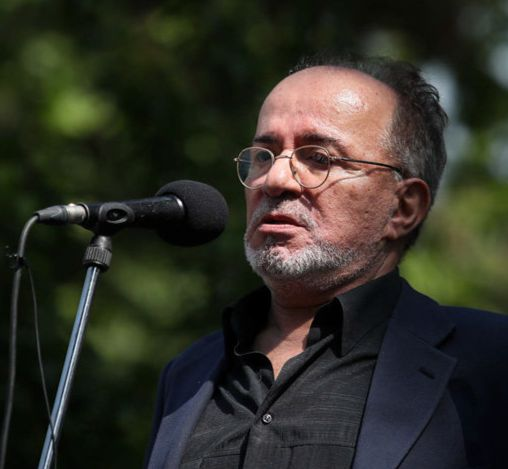
Bizhan birang - 2009

Bijan Birang (Persian: بیژن بیرنگ) (born 1950, Tabriz, Iran) is an Iranian film director, producer, scriptwriter in the Persian cinema and Media.

== Early life ==
Birang was born in 1950 in Tabriz, Iran. He then went to University of Tehran, Department of Fine Arts in 1976 and finally emigrated to United States and graduated from University of Southern California in the field of Educational technology.

Birang started his cinematic career by screenwriting. Then he resumed his career by involving on IRIB's projects, such as comedy and children's programs.

== Filmography ==
=== Cinema ===
- 1 - Iranian dinner (2011)
- 2 - The Love Story (2006)
- 3 - Cinderella (2001)
- 4 - Ali and jungle's devil (1988)

=== Series ===
- Love is not Closed (2014)
