= List of assassinations in Asia =

This is a list of assassinations which took place on the continent of Asia.

For the purposes of this article, an assassination is defined as the deliberate, premeditated murder of a prominent figure, often for religious or political reasons.

== Afghanistan ==
Date	Victim(s)	Assassin(s)	Notes
20 February 1919	Habibullah Khan, emir of Afghanistan	Shuja-ud-Daula Ghourbandi	
8 November 1933	Mohammed Nadir Shah, king of Afghanistan	Abdul Khaliq Hazara	
17 April 1978	Mir Akbar Khyber, leftist intellectual and leader in the People's Democratic Party of Afghanistan		His assassination became a catalyst for the Saur Revolution
28 April 1978	Mohammed Daoud Khan, President of Afghanistan		Killed in the Saur Revolution
14 February 1979	Adolph Dubs, United States Ambassador to Afghanistan		Abducted and killed by an undetermined group
14 September 1979	Nur Mohammad Taraki, President of Afghanistan		Said to have been smothered to death with a pillow on the orders of Hafizullah Amin
27 December 1979	Hafizullah Amin, Prime Minister of Afghanistan		Killed by Soviet forces in the early stages of the Soviet–Afghan War
4 February 1987	Meena Keshwar Kamal, Afghan founder of the Revolutionary Association of the Women of Afghanistan		
20 March 1995	Abdul Ali Mazari, warlord and leader of the Hazara community	Taliban	Killed by the Taliban during the fall of Kabul
27 September 1996	Mohammed Najibullah, former president of Afghanistan		Killed along with his brother by the Taliban during the capture of Kabul
9 September 2001	Ahmed Shah Massoud, leader of the Afghan Northern Alliance	Al Qaeda suicide bombers working for the Taliban posing as journalists	Killed by a bomb hidden in a camera 2 days before the 9/11 attacks.
26 October 2001	Abdul Haq, Afghan Northern Alliance commander		Killed by remnants of the Taliban
November 2001	Mohammed Atef, alleged military chief of al-Qaeda		Killed in a U.S. drone strike
November 2001	Juma Namangani, co-founder of the Islamic Movement of Uzbekistan		
14 February 2002	Abdul Rahman, Minister for Civil Aviation and Tourism		
6 July 2002	Abdul Qadir, Vice President of Afghanistan		
12 May 2007	Dadullah, Taliban senior military commander		killed by British and German special forces
3 May 2007	Abdul Sabur Farid Kuhestani, former prime minister of Afghanistan		Assassinated outside his home in Kabul
27 August 2009	Tohir Yo'ldosh, co-founder of Islamic Movement of Uzbekistan		Killed in a U.S. drone strike
12 July 2011	Ahmed Wali Karzai, half-brother of President Hamid Karzai	Sardar Mohammad	Shot twice in the head and chest by his security guard as he was coming out of his bathroom
17 July 2011	Jan Mohammad Khan, former governor of Uruzgan		Killed by the Taliban
20 September 2011	Burhanuddin Rabbani, former president of Afghanistan		Killed in a suicide bombing by the Taliban or the Haqqani network while leading peace negotiations between the Afghan government and the Taliban
5 June 2016	Shir Wali Wardak, Member of the National Assembly and member of the parliamentary economic committee.	Islamic State and maybe the Taliban.	Killed by a hidden bomb, along with 11 other people, including bodyguards.
18 October 2018	Abdul Raziq Achakzai, Lieutenant General of the Afghan Border Force		
31 July 2022	Ayman al-Zawahiri, leader of Al-Qaeda		Killed by a U.S. drone strike in Kabul. See Killing of Ayman al-Zawahiri
11 August 2022	Rahimullah Haqqani, Islamic cleric		Killed in a suicide bombing in Kabul
2 September 2022	Mujib Rahman Ansari, Islamic cleric		Killed in a suicide bombing in Herat
15 January 2023	Mursal Nabizada, female former MP and Taliban critic		
6 June 2023	Nisar Ahmad Ahmadi, Governor of Badakhshan Province		
11 December 2024	Khalil Haqqani, Acting Minister of Refugee and Repatriation		Killed in a suicide bombing in Kabul

== Armenia ==
Date	Victim(s)	Assassin(s)	Notes
14 April 1992	Artur Mkrtchyan, Chairman of the Supreme Council of the Nagorno-Karabakh Republic		
15 April 1994	Vardges Petrosyan, novelist and playwright		death remains unsolved.
17 December 1994	Hambardzum Galstyan, former mayor of Yerevan and member of the Karabakh Committee		
27 October 1999	Vazgen Sargsyan, Prime Minister of Armenia, Karen Demirchyan, President of the National Assembly of Armenia and 6 other politicians	Nairi Hunanyan	Were shot dead in an attack on the Armenian National Assembly by a group of armed men who claimed to be staging a coup d'état. According to the attackers, Sargsyan was their only target, and the seven other deaths had been unintentional.
2 April 2013	Hrach Muradian, Mayor of Proshyan		

== Azerbaijan ==
Date	Victim(s)	Assassin(s)	Notes
26 September 1907	Khanlar Safaraliyev, labor organizer and Social Democrat		
April 1993	Eduard Huseynov, counter admiral		Assassinated near his home in Baku.
29 September 1994	Afiyaddin Jalilov, deputy speaker of the National Assembly		Assassinated near his home in Baku
29 September 1994	Shamsi Rahimov, intelligence and national security chief		Assassinated near his home in Baku
17 March 1995	Rovshan Javadov, the chief of the Special Purpose Police Detachment of Azerbaijan		Killed in the 1995 Azeri coup d'état attempt
28 May 1996	Ali Ansukhski, member of the National Assembly	Mahir Ahmadov	Assassinated near his home in Baku
21 February 1997	Ziya Bunyadov, historian	Unknown, presumed to be Hezbollah	Assassinated near his home in Baku
13 March 2002	Rovshan Aliyev, criminalist	Haji Mammadov	
14 June 2004	Fatulla Huseynov, colonel and vice president of the Association of Football Federations of Azerbaijan	Haji Mammadov	Assassinated near his home in Baku
25 March 2005	Elmar Huseynov, journalist	Unknown, believed to be figures within the government of Azerbaijan	Shot at his home in Baku.
11 February 2009	Rail Rzayev, commander of the Azerbaijani Air Force		Assassinated near his home in Baku.

== Bangladesh ==
Date	Victim(s)	Assassin(s)	Notes
15 August 1975	Sheikh Mujibur Rahman, independence leader and first President of Bangladesh	Members of the Awami League	Killed along with several members of his family in a coup planned by disgruntled Awami League colleagues and military officers led by Khondaker Mostaq Ahmad. See Assassination of Sheikh Mujibur Rahman
3 November 1975	Muhammad Mansur Ali, Prime Minister of Bangladesh		Killed by military officers in Dhaka Central Jail in the aftermath of the 15 August 1975 Bangladesh coup d'état
3 November 1975	Tajuddin Ahmad, former prime minister of Bangladesh		Killed by military officers in Dhaka Central Jail in the aftermath of the 15 August 1975 Bangladesh coup d'état
3 November 1975	Syed Nazrul Islam, former president of Bangladesh		Killed by military officers in Dhaka Central Jail in the aftermath of the 15 August 1975 Bangladesh coup d'état
3 November 1975	Abul Hasnat Muhammad Qamaruzzaman, Minister of Industries		Killed by military officers in Dhaka Central Jail in the aftermath of the 15 August 1975 Bangladesh coup d'état
7 November 1975	Khaled Mosharraf, Chief of Army Staff		Killed during the 7 November 1975 Bangladesh coup d'état shortly after seizing power in the 3 November 1975 Bangladesh coup d'état
30 May 1981	Ziaur Rahman, President of Bangladesh	Group of Bangladesh Army officers	Killed in a coup d'état led by General Abul Monjur. See Assassination of Ziaur Rahman
27 January 2005	Shah A M S Kibria, former Finance Minister		Killed in a grenade attack in his constituency of Habiganj, Sylhet
12 December 2025	Osman Hadi, poet and activist	Unknown	Shot in the head after leaving a mosque. Hadi succumbed to his wounds on 18 December.

== Bhutan ==
Date	Victim(s)	Assassin(s)	Notes
6 April 1964	Jigme Palden Dorji, Prime Minister of Bhutan	A Royal Bhutan Army corporal	Bahadur Namgyal, head of the Royal Bhutan Army, was later executed for the plot

== Cambodia ==
Date	Victim(s)	Assassin(s)	Notes
14 January 1950	Ieu Koeus, briefly Prime Minister of Cambodia in 1949		
17 April 1975	Long Boret, Prime Minister of the Khmer Republic		Killed by the Khmer Rouge shortly after the fall of Phnom Penh
17 April 1975	Sisowath Sirik Matak, former prime minister of the Khmer Republic and member of the House of Sisowath branch of the Monarchy of Cambodia		Killed by the Khmer Rouge shortly after the fall of Phnom Penh
17 April 1975	Lon Non, military officer, politician and brother of President Lon Nol		Killed by the Khmer Rouge shortly after the fall of Phnom Penh
18 April 1975	Hang Thun Hak, former prime minister of the Khmer Republic		Killed by the Khmer Rouge shortly after the fall of Phnom Penh
15 June 1997	Son Sen, former Defence Minister of Democratic Kampuchea; Yun Yat, former Information Minister of Democratic Kampuchea		Killed during infighting within the Khmer Rouge
7 January 2025	Lim Kimya, politician	Ekkalak Pheanoi	

== China ==
Date	Victim(s)	Assassin(s)	Notes
238 BC	Lord Chunshen, prime minister of the Kingdom of Chu	Li Yuan	
192	Dong Zhuo, warlord and de facto ruler of China	Lü Bu, Li Su, Wang Yun	Killed in Chang'an
221	Zhang Fei, military general of Shu Han	Fan Qiang, Zhang Da	
11 April 618	Emperor Yang of Sui, second Emperor of the Sui dynasty.	Yuwenji	
13 July 815	Wu Yuanheng, Chancellor to Emperor Xianzong		
1207	Han Tuozhou, Chancellor to Emperor Ningzong of the Southern Song Dynasty	Shi Miyuan (disputed)	
10 April 1282	Ahmad Fanakati, Finance minister to Kublai Khan of the Yuan Dynasty	Wang Zhu and Gao Heshang	Killed in Khanbaliq
4 September 1323	Sidibala, grand-khan of the Mongol Empire, Emperor of the Yuan Dynasty		
22 August 1849	João Maria Ferreira do Amaral, Portuguese Governor of Macau		
22 August 1870	Ma Xinyi, Viceroy of Liangjiang	Zhang Wenxiang	
28 March 1894	Kim Ok-gyun, Korean reformist and pro-Western activist	Hong Jong-u	Killed aboard ship en route to Shanghai
26 October 1909	Ito Hirobumi, Japanese Resident-General of Korea and former prime minister of Japan	An Jung-geun	Killed in Manchuria
22 March 1913	Song Jiaoren, Prime Minister-elect of the Republic of China		Killed in Shanghai
18 May 1916	Chen Qimei, revolutionary activist		Killed on the orders of Yuan Shikai, probably by Yuan's general Zhang Zongchang
20 August 1925	Liao Zhongkai, member of the Executive Committee Kuomintang party		
4 June 1928	Zhang Zuolin, Manchurian warlord		Killed by a bomb planted by officers of the Japanese Kwantung Army.
December 1941	Fang Zhenwu, military officer		Assassinated by Kuomintang agents
15 July 1946	Wen Yiduo, poet and scholar	Tang Shiliang, Li Wenshan	
22 January 2003	Li Haicang, chairman of Jianlong Steel	Feng Yinliang	

== Georgia ==
Date	Victim(s)	Assassin(s)	Notes
19 June 1920	Fatali Khan Khoyski, former prime minister of the Democratic Republic of Azerbaijan	Aram Yerganian	Killed by the Armenian Revolutionary Federation as part of Operation Nemesis
21 July 1922	Cemal Pasha, former Ottoman Navy Minister		Killed by the Armenian Revolutionary Federation as part of Operation Nemesis
3 December 1994	Giorgi Chanturia, opposition leader		Shot along with his wife by four gunmen in their car
20 May 2007	Guram Sharadze, historian and nationalist politician		Assassinated in Tbilisi

== India ==
Date	Victim(s)	Assassin(s)	Notes
682 BC	Ripunjaya, last ruler of the Brihadratha dynasty.	Punika (also known as Pulika)	Punika puts his son Pradyota on the throne.
185 BC	Brihadratha Maurya, last ruler of the Mauryan dynasty	Pushyamitra Shunga	Pushyamitra founds the Shunga Empire.
June 1070	Athirajendra, Raja of the Chola Empire	Vaishnava rebellion	Athirajendra was killed by a Vaishnava uprising. He was succeeded by Kulottunga I.
19 July 1296	Jalal-ud-din Khalji, first Sultan of the Tughluq dynasty.	Alauddin Khalji	Alauddin succeeded Jalal-ud-din to become the next Sultan of Delhi.
30 January 1528	Rana Sanga, Rana of Mewar	Mewar nobles	After the Rajput defeat at Khanwa in 1527, Rana Sanga made plans to attack the Mughals, but was poisoned by his nobles before the plan could be executed as they did not wish to fight another war with Babur.
12 August 1602	Abu'l-Fazl ibn Mubarak, vizier of the Mughal emperor Akbar	Vir Singh Deo	Killed in a plot orchestrated by Prince Salim, because Abu'l-Fazl opposed Salim's accession to the throne
1716	Chakdor Namgyal, Chogyal of Sikkim	A doctor hired by Pende Ongmu	Killed in an attempted usurpation by Chakdor's half-sister Pende Ongmu
8 February 1872	Earl of Mayo (Richard Bourke), Viceroy of India	Sher Ali Afridi	Stabbed while inspecting prisons in the Andaman and Nicobar Islands.
30 January 1948	Mahatma Gandhi, independence leader and key proponent of non-violence	Nathuram Godse	See Assassination of Mahatma Gandhi
6 February 1965	Partap Singh Kairon, Chief Minister of Punjab	Sucha Bassi, Baldev Singh and Nahar Singh 'Fauji'	See Partap Singh Kairon
3 January 1975	Lalit Narayan Mishra, Union Minister for Railways	Santoshanand, Sudevanand and Gopalji, Ranjan Dwivedi	See Lalit Narayan Mishra
31 October 1984	Indira Gandhi, Prime Minister of India	Satwant Singh and Beant Singh	Shot by Sikh bodyguards in retaliation for Operation Blue Star. See Assassination of Indira Gandhi.
10 August 1986	Arun Shridhar Vaidya, Chief of the Army Staff and Chairman Chiefs of Staff Committee of the Indian Armed Forces	Sukhdev Singh Sukha and Harjinder Singh Jinda	
8 March 1988	Amar Singh Chamkila, controversial Punjabi singer/songwriter		
27 April 1991	Malkiat Singh Sidnu, Minister of State and former planning minister of Punjab	Unknown	Shot outside his home. He had survived an assassination attempt in Canada 5 years prior.
21 May 1991	Rajiv Gandhi, former prime minister of India	Thenmuli Rajaratnam	Killed in an explosion triggered by a LTTE suicide bomber. First politician to be killed by a suicide bomber. See Assassination of Rajiv Gandhi.
19 March 1994	Thakur Ji Pathak, former National General Secretary of the Janata Dal	Criminal gangs	Shot dead while he was going to court by some antisocial youths.
31 August 1995	Beant Singh, chief minister of Punjab	Dilawar Singh Babbar	
12 August 1997	Gulshan Kumar, T-Series founder and Bollywood music producer	Abu Salem and Fazlur Rahman	A Mumbai underworld organisation called D-Company is considered to have been responsible for this assassination.
25 July 2001	Phoolan Devi, bandit queen turned Member of the Lok Sabha	Sher Singh Rana	
21 May 2002	Abdul Ghani Lone, moderate Kashmiri Muslim separatist leader		possibly killed by Pakistani intelligence services.
22 April 2006	Pramod Mahajan, former Minister of Defence, Parliamentary Affairs and Communications and Information Technology	Pravin Mahajan, his brother	
29 May 2022	Sidhu Moosewala, Punjabi singer/songwriter turned politician		Shot dead while he was travelling in his Mahindra Thar
9 January 2023	Naba Das, Odisha State Minister of Health and Family Welfare		
15 April 2023	Atique Ahmed, former Member of the Lok Sabha		Shot dead along with his brother on live television

== Indonesia ==
Date	Victim(s)	Assassin(s)	Notes
1 October 1965	Achmad Yani, Lieutenant General and Chief of Staff of the Indonesian Army		Killed as part of the 30 September Movement
1 October 1965	Soeprapto, Major General and Second Deputy Commander of the Indonesian Army		Killed as part of the 30 September Movement
1 October 1965	M. T. Haryono, Major General and Third Deputy Commander of the Indonesian Army		Killed as part of the 30 September Movement
1 October 1965	Siswondo Parman, Major General		Killed as part of the 30 September Movement
1 October 1965	Donald Izacus Panjaitan, Brigadier General		Killed as part of the 30 September Movement
1 October 1965	Sutoyo Siswomiharjo, Brigadier General and Judge Advocate General of the Army		Killed as part of the 30 September Movement
22 November 1965	Dipa Nusantara Aidit, leader of the Communist Party of Indonesia		Killed during the Indonesian mass killings of 1965–66
7 September 2004	Munir Said Thalib, human rights and anti-corruption activist	Pollycarpus Priyanto	Poisoned with arsenic while flying on a Garuda Indonesia flight from Jakarta to Amsterdam

== Iran ==
Date	Victim(s)	Assassin(s)	Notes
465 BC	Xerxes I, Persian king	Artabanus, commander of the royal bodyguard	
423 BC	Xerxes II, Persian king	Sogdianus, Xerxes' half-brother	
423 BC	Sogdianus, Persian king	Darius II, Sogdianus' half-brother	
651	Yazdegerd III, Persian king	Assassin sent by Mahoe Suri	
23 August 818	Ali al-Ridha, eighth Imam of Shi'ite Islam		Ali al-Rida died in Tus (present-day Mashhad) on the last day of Safar 203 (September 818), possibly poisoned or due to Foodborne illness.
14 October 1092	Nizam al-Mulk, scholar and vizier of the Seljuk Sultanate	Order of Assassins	
September 1097	Bursuq the Elder, senior commander in the Seljuk Empire	Order of Assassins	Killed near Sarakhs by a Quhistani companion.
29 August 1135	Al-Mustarshid, Abbasid caliph of Baghdad	Order of Assassins	Al-Mustarshid was in the caliphal tent, he was found murdered while reading the Quran, as is supposed, by an emissary of the Shia Assassins.
6 June 1138	Al-Rashid Billah, thirtieth Abbasid Caliph of Baghdad	Order of Assassins	Al-Rashid went to Isfahan where he was assassinated by a team of four Assassins. This was celebrated in Alamut for a week.
20 June 1747	Nader Shah, Shah of Persia	Army officers led by Salah Bey, captain of the guards	Nadar was attacked in his sleep, but was able to kill two of the assassins before dying.
11 February 1829	Alexander Griboyedov, Russian Ambassador to Persia		Killed by a mob
1 May 1896	Nasser-al-Din Shah, Shah of Persia	Mirza Reza Kermani	Assassinated on the day of his fiftieth kingship ceremony.
3 October 1933	Abdolhossein Teymourtash, Minister of the Imperial Court		Died in Qasr Prison, possibly assassinated by doctor Ahmad Ahmadi
1937	Firouz Mirza Nosrat-ed-Dowleh Farman Farmaian III, former Foreign Minister of Iran		killed after being arrested on the orders of Reza Shah
31 March 1947	Qazi Muhammad, dissident Kurdish political leader		Killed in Mahabad
5 November 1949	Abdolhossein Hazhir, Minister of the Imperial Court	Fada'iyan-e Islam	
7 March 1951	Ali Razmara, Prime Minister of Iran	Khalil Tahmasebi, a member of Fada'iyan-e Islam	Shot in a mosque.
22 January 1965	Hassan Ali Mansur, Prime Minister of Iran	Mohammad Bokharaei, a member of Fada'iyan-e Islam	Died in hospital on 27 January
28 June 1981	Mohammad Beheshti, Chief Justice of Iran	Mohammad Reza Kolahi, an operative of the People's Mujahedin of Iran	Killed along with 72 others in the Hafte Tir bombing
30 August 1981	Mohammad Ali Rajai, President of Iran; Mohammad Javad Bahonar, Prime Minister of Iran	Massoud Keshmiri, an operative of the People's Mujahedin of Iran	Killed in the 1981 Iranian Prime Minister's office bombing
23 November 1988	Kazem Sami, former Minister of Health and leader of the JAMA Party		Believed to have been killed as part of the Chain Murders
30 January 1994	Haik Hovsepian Mehr, Bishop of the Jama'at-e Rabbani Protestant Church		Believed to have been killed as part of the Chain Murders
5 July 1994	Mehdi Dibaj, Christian convert from Shia Islam		Believed to have been killed as part of the Chain Murders
15 January 1997	Ahmad Tafazzoli, professor of Iranian culture		Believed to have been killed as part of the Chain Murders
22 February 1997	Ebrahim Zalzadeh, dissident author and editor		Believed to have been killed as part of the Chain Murders
22 September 1998	Hamid Hajizadeh, poet		Believed to have been killed as part of the Chain Murders
19 November 1998	Majid Sharif, translator and journalist		Believed to have been killed as part of the Chain Murders
22 November 1998	Dariush Forouhar, leader of the Party of the Iranian Nation and his wife, Parvaneh Eskandari Forouhar		Believed to have been killed as part of the Chain Murders
3 December 1998	Mohammad Mokhtari, writer and political activist		Believed to have been killed as part of the Chain Murders
8 December 1998	Mohammad-Ja'far Pouyandeh, writer and political activist		Believed to have been killed as part of the Chain Murders
2 August 2005	Masoud Ahmadi Moghaddasi, judge	Majid Kavousifar	Shot twice in the head while commuting home from work
11 January 2012	Mostafa Ahmadi-Roshan, nuclear scientist and university professor		Killed by a bomber from a motorcycle
17 October 2018	Farshid Hakki, human rights activist and environmentalist		Stabbed to death.
27 November 2020	Mohsen Fakhrizadeh, academic physicist and brigadier general in the Islamic Revolutionary Guard Corps		Killed by a remote-controlled machine gun.
22 May 2022	Hassan Sayyad Khodaei, colonel in the Islamic Revolutionary Guard Corps	Unknown, claimed to be Israelis by the IRGC	Shot dead by gunmen on a motorcycle in Tehran
26 April 2023	Ayatollah Abbas-Ali Soleimani, member of the Assembly of Experts		
31 July 2024	Ismail Haniyeh, Chief of Hamas	Israel (alleged)	Haniyeh was killed after attending the inauguration ceremony of Masoud Pezeshkian in Tehran, Iran with varying accounts of either an air strike or a remote controlled detonation device being the cause of his death. His personal bodyguard Wissam Abbu Shaaban was also killed in the blast.
18 January 2025	Mohammad Moghiseh, Iranian Supreme Court judge	Farshad Asadi	Shot and killed inside the country's Supreme Court, the perpetrator committed suicide and no group has yet claimed responsibility. Both men were involved in 1988 executions of Iranian political prisoners.
18 January 2025	Ali Razini, Iranian Supreme Court judge	Farshad Asadi	Shot and killed inside the country's Supreme Court, the perpetrator committed suicide and no group has yet claimed responsibility. Both men were involved in 1988 executions of Iranian political prisoners.
28 February 2026	Ali Khamenei, supreme leader of Iran	Israel and the United States	Killed in the 2026 Israeli–United States strikes on Iran.
17 March 2026	Ali Larijani, secretary of the Supreme National Security Council	Israel	Killed in an Israeli airstrike near Tehran.

== Iraq ==
Date	Victim(s)	Assassin(s)	Notes
681 BC	Sennacherib, Assyrian king	Arda Mulissi	Stabbed to death while at prayer in a temple, or possibly crushed under a winged child angelica.
20 February 244	Gordian III, Roman emperor		Possibly killed near Circesium by his troops
January 26, 661	Ali ibn Abi Talib, first Shiite Imam and 4th Caliph of Sunni Islam	Abd-al-Rahman ibn Muljam	
10 October 680	Husayn ibn Ali, 3rd Imam of Shia Islam and grandson of the Prophet Muhammed		‘Umar ibn Sa'ad, the head of Kufan army, sent a messenger to Husayn to inquire about the purpose of his coming to Iraq. Husayn answered again that he had responded to the invitation of the people of Kufa but was ready to leave if they now disliked his presence. When Umar ibn Sa'ad, the head of Kufan army, reported it back to ibn Ziyad, the governor instructed him to offer Ḥusayn and his supporters the opportunity to swear allegiance to Yazid. He also ordered Umar to cut off Husayn and his followers from access to the water of the Euphrates.On the next morning, as ʿOmar b. Saʿd arranged the Kufan army in battle order, Al-Hurr ibn Yazid al Tamimi challenged him and went over to Al-Ḥusayn. He addressed the Kufans in vain, rebuking them for their treachery to the grandson of Muhammad, and was killed in the battle.
686	Umar ibn Sa'ad, Umayyad general	Abu Amra Kaysan	Killed by Abu Amra Kaysan, on the orders of Mukhtar al-Thaqafi to avenge the death of Husayn ibn Ali
11 December 861	Al-Mutawakkil, tenth Abbasid Caliph	Turkic guards	Caliph al-Mutawakkil had named his three sons as heirs (Al-Muntasir, al-Mu'tazz, al-Mu'ayyad). He seemed to favour al-Muntasir. However, afterwards this seemed to change and al-Muntasir feared his father was going to move against him. So, he decided to strike first. Al-Mutawakkil was killed by a Turkic soldier with the help of his son (Al-Muntasir) on Wednesday the night of 10/11 December, about one hour after midnight, the Turks burst in the chamber where the Caliph was having supper.
21 June 870	Al-Muhtadi, fourteenth Abbasid caliph	Abbasid Turkic regiment	The breakdown in relations between the caliph al-Muhtadi and the Abbasid Turkic regiment contributed to the decision by the Samarran regiments to overthrow and kill al-Muhtadi in 21 June 870
29 October 1936	Jaafar Al-Askari, former Prime Minister of Iraq		Assassinated during the 1936 Iraqi coup d'état
14 July 1958	Faisal II, King of Iraq		Killed during the 14 July Revolution
14 July 1958	Ibrahim Hashem, former Prime Minister of Jordan and Vice President of the Arab Federation		Killed during the 14 July Revolution
15 July 1958	Nuri Pasha as-Said, Prime Minister of Iraq		Killed during the 14 July Revolution
9 February 1963	Abd al-Karim Qasim, Prime Minister of Iraq		Killed during a Baath-backed coup
9 April 1980	Mohammad Baqir al-Sadr, former Grand Ayatollah		Killed by Saddam Hussein
1980	Bint al-Huda, educator and political activist		Killed by Saddam Hussein
24 January 1988	Mahdi al-Hakim, prominent opposition figure		Assassinated in the lobby of the Hilton in the Sudanese capital Khartoum. His companion Halim Abd-al-Wahhab was wounded in the leg.
19 February 1999	Mohammad Mohammad Sadeq al-Sadr, former Grand Ayatollah		Killed in Najaf along with two of his sons
10 April 2003	Abdul-Majid al-Khoei, Shia cleric		
19 August 2003	Sérgio Vieira de Mello, UN Special Representative in Iraq		Killed in the Canal Hotel bombing
29 August 2003	Sayed Mohammed Baqir al-Hakim, highly influential Shi'ite ayatollah		Killed in the Imam Ali Mosque bombing
25 September 2003	Aquila al-Hashimi, Iraqi Governing Council member		
28 October 2003	Ahmad Shawkat, journalist		
7 May 2004	Waldemar Milewicz, Polish journalist		
17 May 2004	Ezzedine Salim, acting chairman of the Iraqi Governing Council and member of parliament		Killed by members of Jama'at al-Tawhid wal-Jihad
1 November 2004	Hatem Kamil, deputy governor of Baghdad Governorate		
4 January 2005	Ali al-Haidari, governor of Baghdad Governorate		
4 January 2005	Hadi Saleh, Secretary of the Iraqi Federation of Trade Unions		
27 April 2005	Lamiya Abed Khadawi, member of parliament		
28 June 2005	Dhari Ali al-Fayadh, member of parliament		Killed by members of al-Qaeda in Iraq
July 2005	Ihab al-Sherif, Egyptian ambassador to Iraq		Abducted on 3 July by al-Qaeda in Iraq; his death was confirmed on 7 July
22 February 2006	Atwar Bahjat, journalist	Yasser al-Takhi	
27 April 2006	Maysoon al-Hashemi, head of the Iraqi Islamic Party women's department		
7 June 2006	Abu Musab al-Zarqawi, leader of al-Qaeda in Iraq		Killed in a U.S. airstrike
29 January 2007	Dia Abdul Zahra Kadim, leader of an armed extremist Shia cult		Killed by U.S. military
1 April 2007	Mohammed Awad, member of parliament		Killed in the 2007 Iraqi Parliament bombing
25 June 2007	Fasal al Gaood, former governor of Al Anbar Governorate		
11 August 2007	Khalil Jalil Hamza, governor of Al-Qādisiyyah Governorate		
20 August 2007	Mohammed Ali al-Hasani, governor of Muthanna Governorate		
13 September 2007	Abdul Sattar Abu Risha, Sunni tribal leader		Killed by al-Qaeda in Iraq
2008	Paulos Faraj Rahho, Chaldean Catholic Archeparch of Mosul	Al-Qaeda in Iraq	Kidnapped on 29 February 2008; his body was discovered on 13 March
5 October 2008	Mohamed Moumou, Number 2 leader of al-Qaeda in Iraq and senior leader in Northern Iraq		Killed by U.S. military
12 June 2009	Harith al-Obeidi, member of parliament		
22 December 2009	Riad Abdel Majid, Brigadier General in the Iraqi Army		
18 April 2010	Abu Ayyub al-Masri, leader of al-Qaeda in Iraq (AQI)		Killed by U.S. and Iraqi forces
15 January 2013	Ayfan Sadoun al-Essawi, prominent Sunni member of parliament		
3 January 2020	Qasem Soleimani, major general of the Iranian Islamic Revolutionary Guard Corps	United States Air Force	Killed in the 2020 Baghdad International Airport airstrike by the United States
3 January 2020	Abu Mahdi al-Muhandis, Secretary-General of Kata'ib Hezbollah	United States Air Force	Killed in the 2020 Baghdad International Airport airstrike by the United States
6 July 2020	Hisham al-Hashimi, historian and researcher	Ahmed Hamdawi Owayid Kinani	Killed outside his home
19 August 2020	Reham Yacoub, human rights advocate and doctor		Shot dead by gunmen on a motorcycle
15 January 2024	Peshraw Dizayee, CEO of Empire World	Islamic Revolutionary Guard Corps	Killed in the 2024 Erbil attack by Iran
15 October 2025	Safa al-Mashhadani, member of the Provincial Baghdad council and parliamentary candidate for the Council of Representatives of Iraq		killed with sticky bomb

== Israel ==
Date	Victim(s)	Assassin(s)	Notes
582/1 BCE	Gedaliah, governor of Yehud	Ishmael son of Nethaniah	
135/4 BCE	Simon Thassi, High Priest of Israel and Crown Prince of Judea	Ptolemy son of Abubus	In addition two of his sons were killed, his wife was held hostage and later killed
58	Jonathan, High Priest of the Second Temple	Antonius Felix	Stabbed to death inside the Second Temple during a Jewish festival by robbers believed to have been members of the Sicarii.
1134	Hugh II of Jaffa		Attacked by a Breton knight, and died of his wounds shortly after.
October 1174	Miles of Plancy, regent of the Kingdom of Jerusalem		
28 April 1192	Conrad of Montferrat, King of Jerusalem and leader in the Third Crusade		Killed by Hashshashin
30 June 1924	Jacob Israël de Haan, pro-Orthodox Jewish diplomat		Killed by members of Haganah
16 June 1933	Haim Arlosoroff, Zionist leader in the British Mandate of Palestine		
26 August 1939	Ralph Cairns, commander of the Palestine Police CID's Jewish Section in Jerusalem		Assassinated by the Irgun under orders from its commander, Hanoch Kalai
28 May 1948	Thomas C. Wasson, US Consul General in Jerusalem		Shot by a sniper in West Jerusalem
17 September 1948	Folke Bernadotte, Middle East peace mediator and member of the Swedish Royal Family	Lehi	Assassinated by the Lehi during the First Arab-Israeli War
15 March 1957	Rudolf Kastner, Hungarian Zionist leader, negotiated the Kasztner train with the Nazis	Ze'ev Eckstein, a member of the Lehi	
12 January 1981	Hamad Abu Rabia, member of the Knesset		Killed by the sons of Jabr Muadi, a Druze politician
10 February 1983	Emil Grunzweig, peace activist	Yonah Avrushmi	Killed by a grenade explosion launched by a right-wing activist during a Peace Now demonstration
4 November 1995	Yitzhak Rabin, Prime Minister of Israel and 1994 Nobel Peace Prize recipient	Yigal Amir	Shot by an opponent of the Oslo Accords. See Assassination of Yitzhak Rabin.
31 December 2000	Binyamin Ze'ev Kahane, son of Meir David Kahane, leader of Kahane Chai, Zionist		
17 October 2001	Rehavam Zeevi, Minister of Tourism	Hamdi Quran, Basel al-Asmar, Majdi Rahima Rimawi, and Ahad Olma, members of the Popular Front for the Liberation of Palestine	

== Japan ==
Date	Victim(s)	Assassin(s)	Notes
456	Emperor Ankō, Emperor of Japan	Prince Mayowa no Ōkimi	
592	Emperor Sushun, Emperor of Japan	Yamato no Aya no Ataikoma	The assassination was ordered by Soga no Umako
645	Soga no Iruka, son of influential statesman Soga no Emishi		Killed on the orders of Nakatomi no Kamatari and Prince Naka no Ōe
11 February 1160	Minamoto no Yoshitomo, head of Minamoto clan, father of Minamoto no Yoritomo		
13 February 1219	Minamoto no Sanetomo, third shōgun of the Kamakura shogunate	Kugyō, Sanetomo's nephew	
12 July 1441	Ashikaga Yoshinori, sixth shōgun of the Ashikaga shogunate		Killed on the orders of Akamatsu Mitsusuke
25 August 1486	Ōta Dōkan, samurai, architect and builder of Edo Castle		
1 August 1507	Hosokawa Masamoto, shugo daimyō of Ashikaga shogunate	Kosai Motonaga and Hosokawa Sumiyuki	
1535	Matsudaira Kiyoyasu, daimyō, feudal leader		
30 September 1551	Ōuchi Yoshitaka, daimyō, feudal leader		
22 November 1557	Oda Nobuyuki, samurai, younger brother of Oda Nobunaga		
17 June 1565	Ashikaga Yoshiteru, shōgun, feudal leader	Miyoshi clan	Killed on the orders of Matsunaga Hisahide
24 February 1566	Mimura Iechika, daimyō, feudal leader	Endō Matajirō and Yoshijirō	Killed on the orders of Ukita Naoie
20 August 1578	Yamanaka Shikanosuke, samurai		Killed by soldiers of the Mōri clan
21 June 1582	Oda Nobunaga, samurai warlord	Forces of Akechi Mitsuhide	
1669	Shakushain, Ainu chieftain		
30 January 1703	Kira Yoshinaka, master of ceremonies		Killed by a group known as the Forty-seven Ronin
March 24, 1860	Ii Naosuke, Tairō of the Tokugawa Shogunate		
27 October 1863	Serizawa Kamo, chief of Shinsen-gumi		
12 August 1864	Sakuma Shozan, politician	Kawakami Gensai, samurai	
10 December 1867	Sakamoto Ryōma, author		
7 December 1869	Ōmura Masujirō, military leader and theorist		
15 February 1869	Yokoi Shōnan, scholar and politician		
14 May 1878	Okubo Toshimichi, Home Minister of Japan, briefly most powerful man in Japan	Shimada Ichirō	
12 February 1889	Mori Arinori, Education Minister		
28 September 1921	Yasuda Zenjirō, entrepreneur and founder of the Yasuda zaibatsu, great-grand father of Yoko Ono	Asahi Heigo	
4 November 1921	Hara Takashi, Prime Minister of Japan	Nakaoka Kon'ichi, a right-wing railroad switchman	
26 August 1931	Osachi Hamaguchi, Prime Minister of Japan	Tomeo Sagoya, a member of the Aikoku-sha ultranationalist secret society	
9 February 1932	Junnosuke Inoue, businessman	Sho Onuma	Part of the League of Blood Incident
5 March 1932	Dan Takuma, zaibatsu leader	Goro Hishinuma, right-wing nationalist	Part of the League of Blood Incident
15 May 1932	Inukai Tsuyoshi, Prime Minister of Japan		Killed by naval officers in the May 15 Incident
26 May 1932	Yoshinori Shirakawa, general of the Imperial Japanese Army	Yun Bong-gil, Korean independence activist	
12 August 1935	Tetsuzan Nagata, general of the Imperial Japanese Army	Saburo Aizawa, army officer	
26 February 1936	Saitō Makoto, admiral of the Imperial Japanese Navy, former prime minister of Japan	Imperial Way Faction	Killed in the February 26 Incident.
26 February 1936	Takahashi Korekiyo, former prime minister of Japan	Imperial Way Faction	Killed in the February 26 Incident.
26 February 1936	Jōtarō Watanabe, Inspector General of Military Training	Imperial Way Faction	Killed in the February 26 Incident.
12 October 1960	Inejiro Asanuma, Socialist Party of Japan chairman	Otoya Yamaguchi	While Asanuma spoke from the lectern at Tokyo's Hibiya Hall during a televised debate, Yamaguchi rushed onstage and ran his wakizashi (a type of traditional Japanese sword) through Asanuma's abdomen, killing him.
18 June 1985	Kazuo Nagano, fraudster	Masakazu Yano and Atsuo Iida	
5 November 1989	Tsutsumi Sakamoto, anti-cult lawyer	Aum Shinrikyo members	Killed alongside his wife and infant son for his anti-Aum efforts. Aum members Hideo Murai, Tomomasa Nakagawa, Kazuaki Okazaki, and Satoro Hashimoto were charged with the murders.
12 July 1991	Hitoshi Igarashi, translated The Satanic Verses into Japanese		
23 April 1995	Hideo Murai, leading member of Aum Shinrikyo	Hiroyuki Jo, member of the Yamaguchi-gumi	Stabbed to death in Tokyo. Jo had claimed he had been ordered him to kill any Aum Shinrikyo leaders that he could. It is believed that this was done out of fear of the yakuza's connections to the cult being made public.
25 October 2002	Kōki Ishii, Member of the House of Representatives	Ito Hakusui, member of the Yamaguchi-gumi	
18 April 2007	Iccho Itoh, Mayor of Nagasaki	Tetsuya Shiroo, member of the Yamaguchi-gumi	
8 July 2022	Shinzo Abe, Member of the House of Representatives and former prime minister of Japan	Tetsuya Yamagami	Shot in the chest and neck during a campaign speech in Nara by an improvised firearm.

== Jordan ==
Date	Victim(s)	Assassin(s)	Notes
1200 BC	Eglon, Moabite king	Ehud	Stabbed to death in his throne room (Judges 3:12-30).
17 July 1951	Riad Al Solh, former prime minister of Lebanon		Shot at Amman Airport during visit to Jordan by members of the Syrian Social Nationalist Party.
20 July 1951	Abdullah I, King of Jordan	Mustafa Ashi, a Palestinian from the al-Husayni family	Shot when entering the Al Aqsa Mosque.
29 August 1960	Hazza al-Majali, Prime Minister of Jordan		Killed with 10 others by time bomb in office
28 October 2002	Laurence Foley, USAID official		Killed by Al-Qaeda operatives

== Kazakhstan ==
Date	Victim(s)	Assassin(s)	Notes
11 February 2006	Altynbek Sarsenbayuly, former government minister turned opposition leader and critic of President Nursultan Nazarbayev		

== Korea ==
Date	Victim(s)	Assassin(s)	Notes
8 October 1895	Queen Min, the first official wife of King Gojong, the 26th king of the Joseon dynasty of Korea.	Japanese agents under Miura Goro, with the aid of the "Hullyeondae", a Japanese trained Regiment of the Royal Guards.	See the Assassination of Empress Myeonseong
19 July 1947	Lyuh Woon-hyung, former head of People's Republic of Korea	Han Chigeun, a refugee from North Korea	
26 June 1949	Kim Gu, former president of the Provisional Government of the Republic of Korea	Ahn Doo-hee, a South Korean lieutenant	
15 August 1974	Yuk Young-soo, First Lady of South Korea	Mun Se-gwang	Shot by a North Korean sympathizer during an assassination attempt on her husband, President Park Chung-hee
26 October 1979	Park Chung-hee, President of South Korea	Kim Jae-kyu, Director of the Korean Central Intelligence Agency	See Assassination of Park Chung-hee.

== Kuwait ==
Date	Victim(s)	Assassin(s)	Notes
30 March 1971	Hardan al-Tikriti, former Iraqi defense minister and vice president		Killed on the orders of Saddam Hussein

== Kyrgyzstan ==
Date	Victim(s)	Assassin(s)	Notes
4 December 1980	Sultan Ibraimov, Chairman of the Council of Ministers of the Kirghiz SSR		

== Laos ==
Date	Victim(s)	Assassin(s)	Notes
1 April 1963	Quinim Pholsena, foreign minister of Laos	Chy Kong, a soldier assigned to guard Pholsena's villa	

== Malaysia ==
Date	Victim(s)	Assassin(s)	Notes
2 November 1875	James Wheeler Woodford Birch, British Resident Minister in the State of Perak		Speared to death by followers of Malay chief Lela Pandak Lam, while in the bath-house of his boat at Pasir Salak
10 December 1949	Duncan Stewart, Second Governor of Sarawak, a British Crown Colony (1946–1963)	Rukun 13 members Rosli Dhobie, Morshidi Sidek, Awang Ramli Mohd Deli, and Bujang Suntong	Stabbed to death during his arrival at Sibu
6 October 1951	Henry Gurney, British High Commissioner in Malaya (1948–1951)		Shot to death by a guerilla unit from the Malayan Communist Party at Fraser's Hill during the Malayan Emergency
7 June 1974	Abdul Rahman Hashim, Inspector-General of Police	Malayan Communist Party operative	Shot dead by a communist subversive at Mountbatten Road (now Jalan Tun Perak) and Weld Road (now Jalan Raja Chulan), Kuala Lumpur.
18 October 2006	Shaariibuugiin Altantuyaa, Mongolian national allegedly connected to future Prime Minister Najib Razak and his inner circle		Murdered by C-4 explosives or was killed first and her remains destroyed with C-4 in a deserted area in Shah Alam, near Kuala Lumpur.
11 January 2008	S. Krishnasamy, state assemblyman for the Tenggaroh constituency		
29 July 2013	Hussain Najadi, banker and founder of AmBank		Shot twice at close range by an unidentified assailant
21 June 2016	Bill Kayong, social activist and politician	Mohamad Fitri Pauzi (convicted); Several others charged but acquitted	Kayong was shot dead by Mohamad Fitri Pauzi at a traffic light intersection near a shopping mall in Kuala Baram Bypass. Fitri was sentenced to death for the crime.
13 February 2017	Kim Jong-nam, older brother of North Korean supreme leader Kim Jong-un		Poisoned with VX nerve agent by two women at Kuala Lumpur International Airport

== Maldives ==
Date	Victim(s)	Assassin(s)	Notes
2 October 2012	Afrasheem Ali, legislator and Islamic scholar		

== Mongolia ==
Date	Victim(s)	Assassin(s)	Notes
2 October 1998	Sanjaasürengiin Zorig, politician and democratic activist		Stabbed to death in his apartment

== Myanmar (Burma) ==
Date	Victim(s)	Assassin(s)	Notes
c. 1168	Alaungsithu, King of Pagan Kingdom	Narathu, his son	
1171	Narathu, King of Pagan Kingdom	Multiple	Killed by assassins disguised as astrologers
1550	Tabinshwehti, King of Taungoo Dynasty		Assassinated by Mon revival
1628	Anaukpetlun, King of Nyaungyan Dynasty		
2 August 1866	Crown Prince Ka Naung, son of King Tharrawaddy and younger brother of King Mindon		assassinated during a coup attempt
19 July 1947	Aung San, nationalist leader, Prime Minister of Burma and founder of Thirty Comrades	U Saw (ringleader), former prime minister of British Burma	Shot during a cabinet meeting along with several other ministers
19 July 1947	Thakin Mya, Minister of Finance	U Saw (ringleader), former prime minister of British Burma	Shot during a cabinet meeting along with several other ministers
19 July 1947	Ba Cho, Minister of Information	U Saw (ringleader), former prime minister of British Burma	Shot during a cabinet meeting along with several other ministers
19 July 1947	U Razak, Minister of Education	U Saw (ringleader), former prime minister of British Burma	Shot during a cabinet meeting along with several other ministers
19 July 1947	Mahn Ba Khaing, Minister of Industry	U Saw (ringleader), former prime minister of British Burma	Shot during a cabinet meeting along with several other ministers
19 July 1947	Sao San Htun, Minister of Hill Regions	U Saw (ringleader), former prime minister of British Burma	Shot during a cabinet meeting along with several other ministers
19 July 1947	Ohn Maung, Deputy Minister of Transport	U Saw (ringleader), former prime minister of British Burma	Shot during a cabinet meeting along with several other ministers
19 July 1947	U Ba Win, Minister of Trade	U Saw (ringleader), former prime minister of British Burma	Shot during a cabinet meeting along with several other ministers
9 October 1983	Lee Beom-seok, Foreign Minister of South Korea	North Korean agents	Killed in the Rangoon bombing
9 October 1983	Suh Sang-chul, Minister of Power Resources of South Korea	North Korean agents	Killed in the Rangoon bombing
29 January 2017	Ko Ni, Constitutional Lawyer	Kyi Lin	Killed at Yangon International Airport

== Nepal ==
Date	Victim(s)	Assassin(s)	Notes
25 April 1806	Rana Bahadur Shah, former king of Nepal	Sher Bahadur Shah	Killed by his half brother
17 May 1845	Mathabarsingh Thapa, Prime Minister of Nepal	Jung Bahadur Rana	
14 September 1846	Fateh Jung Shah, Prime Minister of Nepal	Jung Bahadur Rana	Killed in the Kot Massacre
22 November 1885	Ranodip Singh Kunwar, Prime Minister of Nepal	Khadga Shumsher, Bhim Shumsher Jung Bahadur Rana, and Dambar Shumsher	Killed by his nephews in a coup
1 June 2001	Birendra, King of Nepal, along with Queen Aishwarya and 9 other members of the royal family	Alleged to be Crown Prince Dipendra, but not confirmed.	See Nepalese royal massacre.

== Pakistan ==
Date	Victim(s)	Assassin(s)	Notes
16 October 1951	Liaquat Ali Khan, first Prime Minister of Pakistan	Said Akbar Babrak	Shot during a political gathering in Rawalpindi
February 1960	Esther John, Christian nurse		Found murdered in her bed.
8 February 1975	Hayat Sherpao, former Governor of the North-West Frontier Province		Killed by an Afghan Marxist
17 August 1988	Muhammad Zia-ul-Haq, President of Pakistan and Chief of Army Staff of the Pakistan Army		Killed in a suspicious aircraft accident possibly caused by a bomb blast (Disputed by various theories). See Death and state funeral of Muhammad Zia-ul-Haq
24 November 1989	Abdullah Yusuf Azzam, Palestinian Islamic theologian, supporter of the Afghan mujahideen and proponent of militant jihadism		Killed by a car bomb in Peshawar by operatives believed to be working for KhAD or Hekmatyar
3 October 1991	Fazle Haq, former governor of the North-West Frontier Province		
September 1993	Ghulam Haider Wyne, former Chief Minister of Punjab Province		
16 April 1995	Iqbal Masih, 12-year-old anti-child labor activist		Killed for his campaign against abusive child labour
20 September 1996	Murtaza Bhutto, politician, leader of Al-Zulfiqar and estranged brother of Prime Minister Benazir Bhutto		Killed during an encounter with police in Karachi. Suspected to have been killed in extrajudicial fashion.
17 October 1998	Hakim Said, founder of Hamdard Foundation and Hamdard University and former governor of Sindh		
28 July 2001	Siddiq Khan Kanju, former Foreign Minister of Pakistan		
27 December 2007	Benazir Bhutto, former prime minister of Pakistan	Unknown, widely believed to be Islamist militants, possibly Al-Qaeda	Killed by a suicide bomber while leaving a political rally for the Pakistan Peoples Party at the same location where Prime Minister Liaquat Ali Khan was assassinated in Rawalpindi. See Assassination of Benazir Bhutto.
5 August 2009	Baitullah Mehsud, Islamist militant and leader of the Tehrik-i-Taliban Pakistan		Killed by a U.S. drone strike
4 January 2011	Salman Taseer, Governor of Punjab	Malik Mumtaz Hussain Qadri	Killed by one of his security guards due to Taseer's opposition to Pakistan's blasphemy laws
2 March 2011	Shahbaz Bhatti, Minorities Minister	Tehrik-i-Taliban Pakistan	Killed due to his opposition to Pakistan's blasphemy laws
2 May 2011	Osama bin Laden, leader of Al-Qaeda	United States Navy SEALs	Killed in a raid at his clandestine hideout in Abbottabad. See Killing of Osama bin Laden
4 June 2012	Abu Yahya al-Libi, high-ranking Al-Qaeda official	U.S military	Killed by a U.S. drone strike
29 July 2015	Malik Ishaq, founder of Lashkar-e-Jhangvi	Punjab Police	shot dead by members of the Punjab Police
16 August 2015	Shuja Khanzada, Home Minister of Punjab	Lashkar-e-Jhangvi	Killed in the 2015 Attock bombing
1 February 2018	Hazar Khan Bijarani, member of the Provincial Assembly of Sindh and former member of the National Assembly of Pakistan		
2 November 2018	Maulana Sami ul Haq, religious scholar, former Senator and leader of the Jamiat Ulema-e-Islam (S)		
14 October 2022	Muhammad Noor Meskanzai, Chief Justice of the Federal Shariat Court		
10 July 2025	Maulana Khan Zeb, scholar and politician		
5 May 2026	Idris Tarangzai, scholar and politician	Islamic State – Khorasan Province	Killed in drive by shooting.

== Palestine ==
Date	Victim(s)	Assassin(s)	Notes
1986	Zafer al-Masri, Mayor of Nablus		
1996	Yahya Ayyash, Hamas' explosives expert		
2001	Abu Ali Mustafa, leader of the Popular Front for the Liberation of Palestine		
2002	Salah Shahade, leader of Hamas' military wing		
2003	Ibrahim al-Makadmeh, co-founder of Hamas		
2003	Mekled Hameid, Islamic Jihad Movement commander		
22 March 2004	Sheikh Ahmed Yassin, leader and founder of Hamas		
17 April 2004	Abdel Aziz al-Rantissi, leader of Hamas		
26 September 2004	Izz El-Deen Sheikh Khalil, Hamas operative		
21 October 2004	Adnan al-Ghoul, Hamas' explosives expert		
1 January 2009	Nizar Rayan, Senior Hamas leader		
15 January 2009	Said Seyam, Senior Hamas leader		
2009	Abu Zakaria al-Jamal, Senior Hamas military commander		
11 May 2022	Shireen Abu Akleh, journalist	Israeli Defense Force	Was shot while covering a raid on the Jenin Refugee Camp in the West Bank by the IDF and was later determined to have been killed by Israeli fire.
4 December 2025	Yasser Abu Shabab, leader of the Popular Forces	Abu Suneima family	Was shot during an ambush by the Abu Suneima family and died of his wounds near Rafah.

== Qatar ==
Date	Victim(s)	Assassin(s)	Notes
2004	Zelimkhan Yandarbiyev, former president of separatist Chechnya		Killed by a car bomb in Doha. See Assassination of Zelimkhan Yandarbiyev

== Saudi Arabia ==
Date	Victim(s)	Assassin(s)	Notes
November 644	Umar ibn al-Khattab	Abu Lu'lu'a	Stabbed by Persian slave Abu Lu’lu’a (Firuz Nahavandi) while leading congressional prayers in Makkah
25 March 1975	Faisal, King of Saudi Arabia	Prince Faisal bin Musa'id	Shot by nephew at palace.

== Sri Lanka ==
Date	Victim(s)	Assassin(s)	Notes
25 September 1959	S. W. R. D. Bandaranaike, Prime Minister of Ceylon	Talduwe Somarama, a Buddhist monk who later converted to Christianity	See Assassination of S. W. R. D. Bandaranaike
27 July 1975	Alfred Duraiappah, Mayor of Jaffna	Liberation Tigers of Tamil Eelam (LTTE)	
15 December 1986	Daya Pathirana, leader of the Independent Students Union of the University of Colombo	Janatha Vimukthi Peramuna (JVP)	See Assassination of Daya Pathirana
16 February 1989	Vijaya Kumaratunga, movie actor and founder of the Sri Lanka Mahajana Pakshaya	Janatha Vimukthi Peramuna (JVP)	See Assassination of Vijaya Kumaratunga
13 July 1989	A. Amirthalingam, Tamil separatist and leader of the Tamil United Liberation Front	Liberation Tigers of Tamil Eelam (LTTE)	
13 November 1989	Rohana Wijeweera, founder and leader of the Janatha Vimukthi Peramuna	Sri Lankan Armed Forces	
2 March 1991	Ranjan Wijeratne, Foreign Minister & Minister of State for Defence	Liberation Tigers of Tamil Eelam (LTTE)	
23 April 1993	Lalith Athulathmudali, former cabinet minister	Janaka Priyankara Jayamanne; Liberation Tigers of Tamil Eelam (LTTE) (allegedly)	The investigations carried out by the Sri Lanka Police and the Scotland Yard concluded that the assassination was carried out by the LTTE. However the findings were widely disputed, and a new presidential commission appointed to investigate the assassination by President Chandrika Kumaratunga reported former President Ranasinghe Premadasa and close security personnel as directly responsible for the assassination. The assassination remains highly controversial. See Assassination of Lalith Athulathmudali
1 May 1993	Ranasinghe Premadasa, President of Sri Lanka	Liberation Tigers of Tamil Eelam (LTTE)	Killed by a suicide bomber on May Day parade. The attack was purportedly carried out by the LTTE. See Assassination of Ranasinghe Premadasa
24 October 1994	Gamini Dissanayake, presidential candidate and United National Party MP	Liberation Tigers of Tamil Eelam (LTTE)	
17 May 1998	Sarojini Yogeswaran, Mayor of Jaffna	Liberation Tigers of Tamil Eelam (LTTE)	
11 September 1998	Pon Sivapalan, Mayor of Jaffna	Liberation Tigers of Tamil Eelam (LTTE)	
29 July 1999	Neelan Tiruchelvam, Tamil United Liberation Front MP	Liberation Tigers of Tamil Eelam (LTTE)	
18 December 1999	Lakshman Algama, former Chief of Staff of the Army and United National Party politician	Liberation Tigers of Tamil Eelam (LTTE)	
8 June 2000	C. V. Gunaratne, Minister of Industrial Development	Liberation Tigers of Tamil Eelam (LTTE)	
25 December 2005	Joseph Pararajasingham, Tamil National Alliance MP	Tamil Makkal Viduthalai Pulikal (TMVP)	
12 August 2005	Lakshman Kadirgamar, Foreign Minister	Liberation Tigers of Tamil Eelam (LTTE)	
26 June 2006	Parami Kulatunga, army general	Liberation Tigers of Tamil Eelam (LTTE)	
10 November 2006	Nadarajah Raviraj, Tamil National Alliance MP	Pro-government paramilitary groups (allegedly)	
1 January 2008	T. Maheswaran, United National Party MP	Liberation Tigers of Tamil Eelam (LTTE)	Killed by the LTTE in retaliation for having talks with President Mahinda Rajapaksa.
8 January 2008	D. M. Dassanayake, Nation Building Minister and Sri Lanka Freedom Party MP	Liberation Tigers of Tamil Eelam (LTTE)	
6 March 2008	K. Sivanesan, Tamil National Alliance MP	Deep Penetration Unit of the Sri Lankan Army	
6 April 2008	Jeyaraj Fernandopulle, Minister of Highways and Road Development and Sri Lanka Freedom Party MP	Liberation Tigers of Tamil Eelam (LTTE)	
8 January 2009	Lasantha Wickrematunge, editor of The Sunday Leader		A vocal critic of President Mahinda Rajapaksa and his brother Gotabaya Rajapaksa, the then-incumbent defence secretary. Many blamed the government for his assassination. See Assassination of Lasantha Wickrematunge

== Syria ==
Date	Victim(s)	Assassin(s)	Notes
246 BC	Antiochus II Theos, Seleucid king		
223 BC	Seleucus III Ceraunus, Seleucid king		
176 BC	Seleucus IV Philopator, Seleucid king		
146 BC	Alexander Balas, Seleucid king		
138 BC	Antiochus VI Dionysus, Seleucid heir to the throne		
285	Numerian, Roman emperor	Arrius Aper, his father-in-law	Killed in Emesa (modern-day Homs)
May 1103	Janah ad-Dawla, emir of Homs	Order of Assassins	Killed by 3 assassins in the Great Mosque of Homs on the orders of Al-Hakim al-Munajjim.
1146	Imad ad-Din Zengi, ruler of Aleppo and Mosul and founder of the Zengid dynasty	Yarankash	He was assassinated by a Frankish slave named Yarankash in September 1146, after the ruler drunkenly threatened him with punishment for drinking from his goblet.
1213	Raymond of Antioch, heir to the throne of Antioch and Tripoli	Order of Assassins	
1940	Abd al-Rahman Shahbandar, Syrian Arab nationalist		
1 August 2008	Muhammad Suleiman, security adviser to President Bashar al-Assad		
12 February 2008	Imad Mughniyah, senior member of Hezbollah		
18 July 2012	Dawoud Rajiha, Defense Minister	Either Liwa al Islam or the Free Syrian Army (both claimed responsibility)	Killed either with a remotely detonated bomb or via suicide attack as part of the Syrian civil war. Several other leading government officials may have been injured or killed.
18 July 2012	Assef Shawkat, Deputy Defense Minister	Either Liwa al Islam or the Free Syrian Army (both claimed responsibility)	Killed either with a remotely detonated bomb or via suicide attack as part of the Syrian civil war. Several other leading government officials may have been injured or killed.
18 July 2012	Hasan Turkmani, Chief of Staff of the Syrian Armed Forces	Either Liwa al Islam or the Free Syrian Army (both claimed responsibility)	Killed either with a remotely detonated bomb or via suicide attack as part of the Syrian civil war. Several other leading government officials may have been injured or killed.
18 July 2012	Hisham Ikhtiyar, Intelligence and National Security Chief	Either Liwa al Islam or the Free Syrian Army (both claimed responsibility)	Killed either with a remotely detonated bomb or via suicide attack as part of the Syrian civil war. Several other leading government officials may have been injured or killed.

== Thailand ==
Date	Victim(s)	Assassin(s)	Notes
c. 1548	Worawongsathirat, King of the Ayutthaya Kingdom		
9 June 1946	King Ananda Mahidol (Rama VIII), eighth monarch of Thailand under the House of Chakri		Mysteriously found dead in his bedroom with a gunshot wound to the head, whilst a M1911 pistol was found by his left hand (despite him being right-handed).
29 August 1961	Princess Lakshamilavan, King Vajiravudh's 2nd spouse	Sang Homjan; Virat Kanjanaphai	
8 August 1968	Suraphol Sombatcharoen, singer.		Assassinated at 00:02 am., August 8, 1968 at Nakhon Pathom province, in his concert tour time.
16 February 1977	Princess Vibhavadi Rangsit, Princess		Shot down by Communist insurgents in a helicopter crash whilst helping rural villagers in Surat Thani Province.
10 April 1991	Klaew Thanikhul, boxing promoter.		
11 April 1996	Saengchai Sunthornwat, chairman of the public broadcaster MCOT	Ubol Bunyachalothorn	
13 May 2010	Khattiya Sawasdipol, security chief of the Red Shirt Movement during the 2010 Thai political protests		Shot in the head by a sniper while giving an interview to a reporter for The New York Times at about 7 p.m.
7 January 2025	Lim Kimya, former member of parliament of Cambodia	Ekaluck Paenoi (suspected)	Shot twice in the chest after arriving in Bangkok on a bus from Cambodia.
10 August 2026	Thongchai Yenprasert, President of the Nonthaburi Provincial Administrative Organisation	Chalong Riewrang	Shot four times in the chin, face, forehead and neck after entering a bus.

== United Arab Emirates ==
Date	Victim(s)	Assassin(s)	Notes
19 January 2010	Mahmoud al-Mabhouh, a member of Hamas	Widely believed to be Mossad agents	Killed in his hotel room in Dubai. Exact cause of death unknown; possibilities include suffocation, strangulation, and electrocution. See Assassination of Mahmoud al-Mabhouh.
21 November 2024	Zvi Kogan, Israeli-Moldovan rabbi, and assistant to the Chief Rabbi of the UAE Levi Duchman.		Abducted from the kosher supermarket he managed in Dubai by three Uzbek nationals and a fourth accomplice of unknown nationality who had been tracking his movements. His body was subsequently discovered in Al Ain on 24 November along with abandoned car and phone. The three Uzbek nationals fled and were arrested in Turkey before being extradited. On 31 March 2025, the three Uzbeks were sentenced to death while the fourth accomplice was sentenced in absentia to life imprisonment.

== Vietnam ==
Date	Victim(s)	Assassin(s)	Notes
2 November 1963	Ngo Dinh Nhu, politician	Generally believed to be Nguyen Van Nhung and Duong Hieu Nghia, on orders from Duong Van Minh	Killed along with his brother, Ngo Dinh Diem
2 November 1963	Ngo Dinh Diem, first president of South Vietnam	Generally believed to be Nguyen Van Nhung and Duong Hieu Nghia, on orders from Duong Van Minh	Part of the 1963 South Vietnamese coup. See Arrest and assassination of Ngo Dinh Diem.
26 November 1978	Thanh Nga, actress	two kidnappers	Killed along with her husband, Pham Duy Lan, during a failed kidnap of their 5-year-old son in front of their house.

== Yemen ==
Date	Victim(s)	Assassin(s)	Notes
1948	Imam Yahya, King of Yemen		Killed in an ambush during the Alwaziri coup
1977	Ibrahim al-Hamadi, president of North Yemen		
1978	Ahmad al-Ghashmi, president of North Yemen		Killed by bomb along with envoy from South Yemen.
1986	Abdul Fattah Ismail, former Head of State of South Yemen; Ali Ahmad Nasir Antar, Vice President of South Yemen; Saleh Muslih Qassem, Defence Minister of South Yemen; Ali Shayi' Hadi, senior official of the Yemeni Socialist Party	Bodyguards of President Ali Nasir Muhammad	Killed during an attempted coup that sparked the South Yemen Civil War
2002	Jarallah Omar, deputy secretary-general of Yemeni Socialist Party		
2011	Anwar al-Aulaqi, spokesman and recruiter for al-Qaeda, leader of Al-Qaeda in the Arabian Peninsula		Killed in a US drone strike
2013	Said Ali al-Shihri, deputy leader of Al-Qaeda in the Arabian Peninsula		Killed in a US drone strike. Numerous earlier reports of his death had been previously proven wrong.
2017	Ali Abdullah Saleh, former President of Yemen		Killed shortly after withdrawing support for the Houthi movement

== See also ==
- List of assassinations by the Assassins
- List of people who survived assassination attempts
