= Nasser Zarafshan =

Iranian writer, translator, and attorney (born 1946)

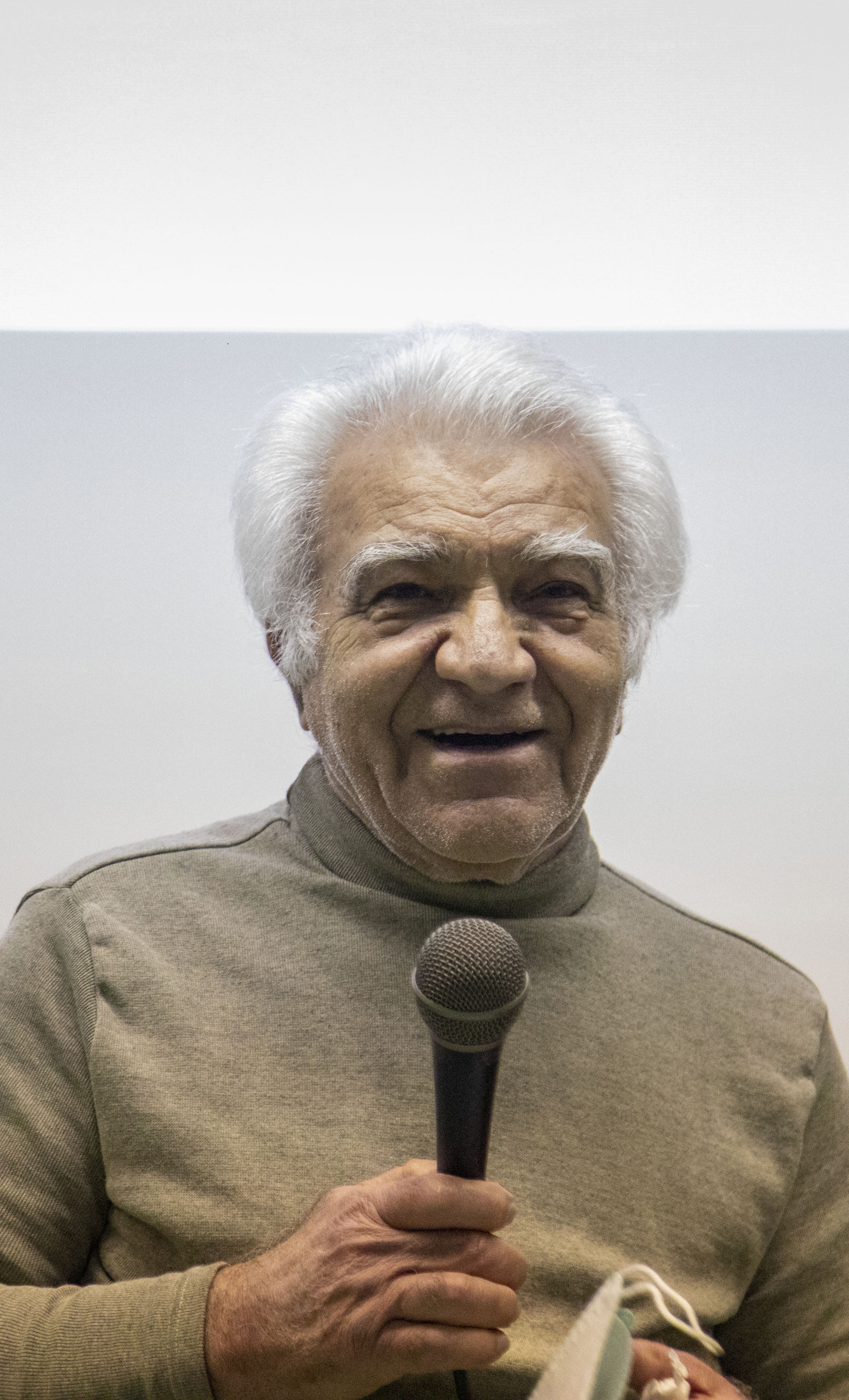
- Born: 1946
- Occupations: Writer, translator

Nasser Zarafshan (Persian: ناصر زرافشان; born 1946) is an Iranian writer, translator, and attorney. He is known for having been arrested while acting as the legal envoy of two of the families of dissident Iranian writers who were assassinated in November 1998 in what came to be known in Iran as the "Chain Murders" or "serial murders" case. The arrest was widely condemned by human rights groups. It is reported that Zarafshan had been tremendously critical of the shortcomings in the official examination into these killings. In 2002 he was sentenced to five years imprisonment and was released from prison in March 2007.

== Before his arrest ==
As a member of the Iranian Writers' Association Kanoon and a notable member of the Iranian Bar Association, Zarafshan's translations and articles have appeared in essential periodicals in Iran.

The murdered journalists included Majid Sharif, an editorialist with the monthly Iran é Farda, writer-journalists Mohamad Mokhtari and Mohammad Jafar Pouyandeh, and a couple, Dariush and Parvaneh Forouhar, who were freedom of expression activists.

== Case history ==
Zarafshan was arrested by members of the Judicial Organization of Armed Forces (JOAF) in October 2000 after giving a speech in the city of Shiraz in which he stated that the intelligence services had murdered five Iranian intellectuals in 1998 in Tehran.

He was initially charged with publishing information about the assassinations, imprisoned in December 2000, and was released after a month pending trial. In February 2002, he was tried in a military court behind closed doors with his solicitor present; the presiding judge was a prosecutor with the JOAF. While in detention, Zarafshan's office was reportedly searched, and weapons and alcohol were allegedly found.

He was sentenced on 19 March 2002 to five years imprisonment (two years for disseminating state secrets, three years for possessing firearms) and 70 lashes for possessing alcohol. Zarafshan denies the firearms and alcohol charges and claims the authorities planted these in his office.

== Imprisonment ==
Iranian judicial organizations have so far failed to explain why Zarafshan, a civilian, was brought before the JOAF, the purpose of which is to try members of the armed forces and Revolutionary Guards for violations of the military code. It is reported that the Chair of the Iranian Parliamentary Committee for Human Rights has protested against using a military court in these circumstances, branding it "unconstitutional."

Zarafshan has reportedly appealed to the Supreme Court and is currently awaiting a decision, according to information as of October 2002. During his imprisonment, he was not only denied medical care for an urgent kidney disease for some time but also was held in a cell with prisoners of violent crimes. On 7 June 2005, Zarafshan started a hunger strike to protest the absence of medical treatment. After a significant deterioration in his health, he ended his hunger strike and was hospitalized for an operation on his kidney in July 2005.

On 16 March 2007, after serving his sentence, Zarafshan was released from prison and told reporters, "I will now do the same things I did before."

He was arrested during the 2006 Commemoration of Murders of Political Dissidents in 1990s. "Nasser Zarafshan, the legal counsel for some of the victims' families who served five years in prison for his defense of human rights, his son Mazdak Zarafshan, Baktash Abtin, a senior member of the Association, and poet Mohammad Mehdipour were among those arrested on December 2, 2016", according to the International Campaign for Human Rights in Iran. He was later released the same day.

== Awards and recognition ==
- PEN/BARBARA GOLDSMITH FREEDOM TO WRITE AWARD, 2004.
- The Kurt Tucholsky Award of the Swedish PEN section in 2006
- The Human Rights Award of the German Association of Judges in 2007.

== See also ==
- Human rights in Islamic Republic of Iran
- Mohammad Mokhtari
- Mohammad-Ja'far Pouyandeh
