= Hoviyat =

Iranian television program

- Country of origin: Iran

Original release
- Network: IRIB TV1
- Release: 1996

Hovyiat (correct English transliteration: "hoviyyat" Persian: برنامه هويت, "Identity") is a biweekly TV program that was produced and aired on Iran's IRIB TV1 in 1996. The program's objective was said to be "confrontation with western cultural invasion." The series targeted a broad range of Iranian intellectuals (secular as well as religious modernists), archeologists, artists, scientists and national leaders as Mohammad Mosaddeq.

It has been described by critics as part of an "ideological campaign" by the Ministry of Intelligence "to paint Westernized [Iranian] intellectuals and artists as unpatriotic, un-Islamic, a threat to Iran's national and religious identity," and which included the "chain murders" of Iranian intellectuals that also occurred during the 1990s.

The show is said to have "specialized in naming intellectuals as `hired agents` of the Baháʼís, Zionists, Freemasons," and foreign powers. A signature of the program was the morphing of an image of American Benjamin Franklin on the American hundred-dollar bill, "into the face of the Iranian intellectual under attack."

One Iranian dissident, Faraj Sarkohi, was kidnapped by security officials after (amongst other things) publishing an article "critical" of Hoviyyat. He was "tortured to 'make and remake' videotapes confessing to being a 'foreign spy' and giving outrageous lies about his own and his colleagues' sex lives," before being released.

== Responsibles ==
- Ali Larijani
- Hossein Shariatmadari
- Saeed Emami
- Nasser Pourpirar

== Targets of the propaganda ==
- Mohammad Mosaddeq
- Ahmad Tafazzoli
- Abdolhossein Zarrinkoub
- Ezzatollah Sahabi
- Ali Akbar Saidi Sirjani
- Nasrollah Pourjavadi

== See also ==
- Chain Murders of Iran
