= Parastou Forouhar =

Iranian installation artist

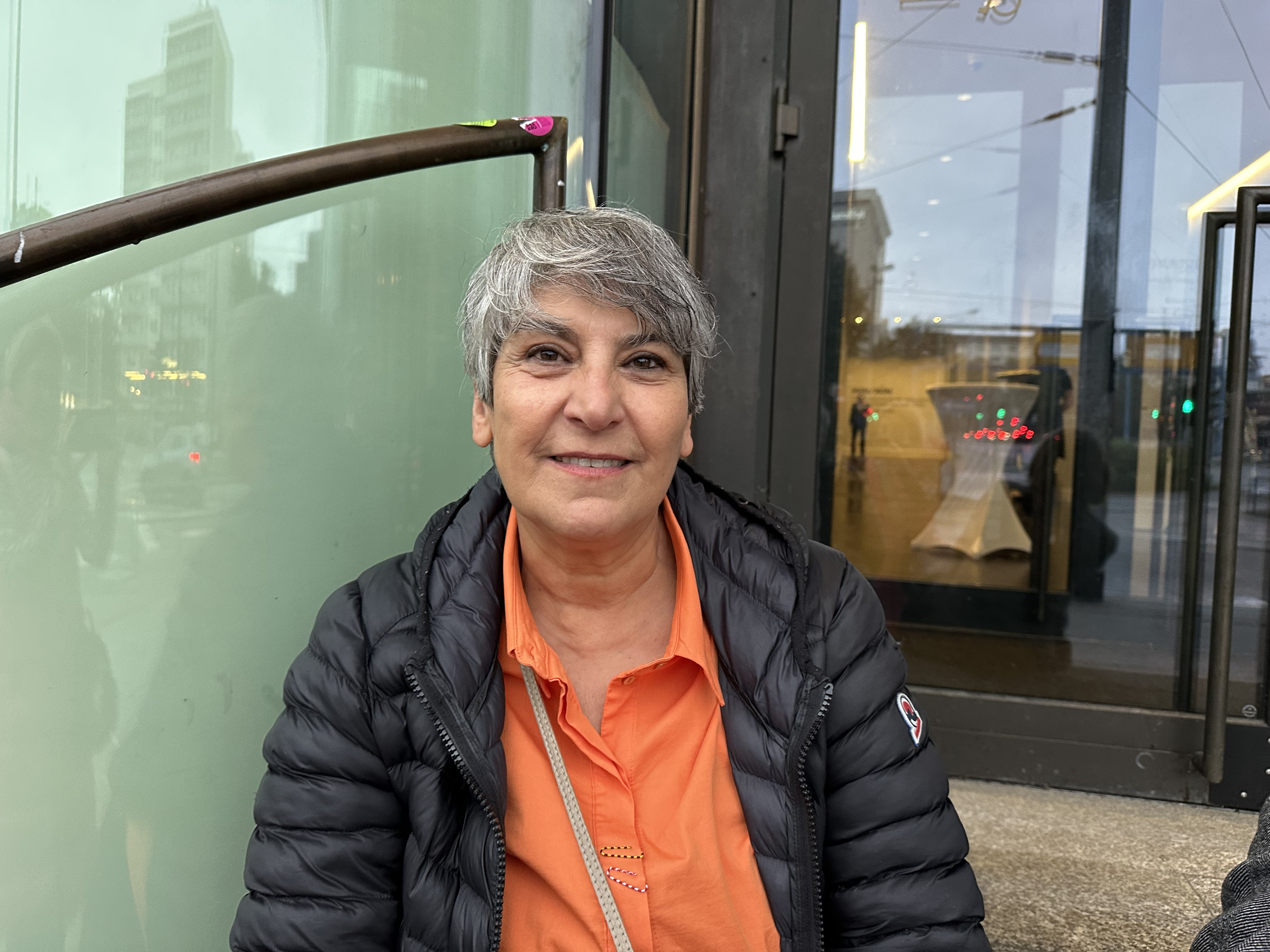
- Born: پرستو فروهر; 1962 (age 63–64); Tehran, Iran
- Education: University of Tehran, College of Art Offenbach, Germany
- Known for: Political art
- Parent(s): Dariush Forouhar, Parvaneh Eskandari (Forouhar)
- Website: http://www.parastou-forouhar.de/

Parastou Forouhar (Persian; پرستو فروهر) (born 1962) is an Iranian installation artist who lives in and works out of Frankfurt, Germany. Forouhar's art reflects her criticism of the Iranian government and often plays with the ideas of identity. Her artwork expresses a critical response towards the politics in Iran and Islamic fundamentalism. The murder of her parents, Dariush Forouhar and Parvaneh Eskandari (Forouhar), fuels Forouhar's work. Forouhar's work has been exhibited around the world including Iran, Germany, Russia, Turkey, England, and the United States.

== Biography ==
=== Early life and education ===
The daughter of political activist Parvaneh Forouhar (née Eskandari) and politician Dariush Forouhar, Parastou was born in 1962 in Tehran, Iran. Parastou studied art at the University of Tehran from 1984 until 1990, where she earned her B.A. She then continued to study at the Hochschule für Gestaltung Offenbach am Main in Germany, and went on to earn her M.A. in 1994. Her father opposed the Iranian government and he founded and led the Hezb-e-Mellat-e Iran (Nation Party of Iran), which was a nationalist secular opposition party in Iran.

Her parents were stabbed to death in their home on November 22 of 1998 by a secret operation of the Iranian Intelligence Service, which is widely known as the Chain murders of Iran. This led Parastou Forouhar to dedicate her life to revealing the atrocities of the Iranian state through her expressive art. Despite it now being decades since the incident, the state intelligence still impedes her from holding a public commemoration for her parents. She has been threatened by the intelligence service several times, and was finally sentenced to six years of conditional prison in 2017.

Parastou lives in exile with her two children in Frankfurt, Germany. Her work has been widely displayed inside and outside of Iran.

=== Work ===
Forouhar's work is autobiographical in nature and responds to the politics that have shaped and defined contemporary Iranian citizenship both in Iran and abroad. She works within a range of media including site specific installation, animation, digital drawing, photography, signs and products. Through her work, she processes very real experiences of loss, pain, and state-sanctioned violence through animations, wallpapers, flipbooks, and drawings. Forouhar uses culturally specific motifs found within traditional Iranian arts such as Islamic calligraphy and Persian miniature painting to question the ways these forms can generate a lack of individual agency while adhering to a standardized understanding of beauty and cultural identity.

The underlying meaning of her works are not visible at first. They look poetic, lines are smooth, blank colors are like the illustration of the books. At first glance, they are pleasant images seeming embellished with details of line marks and vivid colors. However, as one takes time with them and pays attention to the details, they find out the reality of what they are implying. One of her pieces Kahrizak Prison literally refers to an incident that happened in 2009 where a few of the protesters of the Iranian Green Movement were brought to the Kahrizak detention center and for a few months were harshly tortured and raped resulting in at least five deaths. This series of Parastou's work was created in 2009 pointing out the cruel moments of the day. The form of butterfly is referring to her mother's name, Parvaneh which means butterfly but it is not just about her; she references her mother as an example or a starting point and further expands it to a larger oppressed population; the work signifies a totality while it is focused on a specific incident. It also reminds of the butterflies installed in a butterfly collection where the butterflies had been murdered and their freedom of existence had been taken just to serve somebody's desire.

In 2002, the Iranian Cultural Ministry censored Forouhar's photo exhibition, Blind Spot, a collection of images depicting a veiled, gender-neutral figure with a bulbous, featureless face. Forouhar chose to exhibit the empty frames on the wall on opening night instead of forgoing the show.

Forouhar and her brother got involved in activism after their parents were murdered and they weren't allowed to publicly speak about the deaths. Her artwork critiques the Iranian government and focuses on examining her identity and culture.

In 2012 she received the Sophie von La Roche Award as recognition for her work that confronts issues concerning displacement, gender and cultural identity.

Solo exhibitions of Forouhar's work have been held at Stavanger Cultural Center, Norway; Golestan Art Gallery, Tehran; Hamburger Bahnhof - Museum fur Gegenwart, Berlin; City Museum, Crailsheim, Germany; and German Cathedral, Berlin.

She has participated in group exhibitions at Framer Framed, Amsterdam, Schim Kunsthalle, Frankfurt; Frauenmuseum Bonn; Museum of Modern Art, Frankfurt; Neue Galerie am Landesmuseum, Joanneum, Graz, Austria; House of World Cultures, Berlin; Deutsches Hygiene-Museum, Dresden; Jewish Museum of Australia, Melbourne; Law Warschaw Gallery at Macalester College, Saint Paul; and Jewish Museum San Francisco.

Her work can be found in the following permanent collections: The Queensland Art Museum, Queensland; Belvedere, Vienna; Badisches Landesmuseum, Karlsruhe; Museum of Modern Art, Frankfurt; and the Deutsche Bank Art Collection.

Forouhar has been featured in several art fairs including the Brodsky Center Fair, at Rutgers University in 2015, and Pi Artworks fair Istanbul/London, in 2016 and 2017 (she was at both locations: in Contemporary Istanbul and London).

== Opposition to war on Iran ==
Despite the Iranian intelligence service having murdered her parents in the Chain murders of Iran, Forouhar has consistently opposed a foreign military attack on Iran, arguing that such an attack would above all devastate the Iranian people and that democratic change must come from within Iranian society rather than through outside force.

As early as 2012, when asked how her parents would have reacted to the prospect of a Western or American military strike on Iran, she said they would "by no means" have accepted it, adding that for them the territorial integrity and independence of Iran mattered as much as freedom, and that freedom "must well up from within society".

In October 2023 she was among dozens of political and civil activists who signed a statement condemning "the call for a military attack on Iran", which argued that such an attack "would destroy our country and severely weaken and damage the Iranian people's legitimate struggle for democracy and peace".

After the outbreak of the Twelve-Day War between Israel and Iran in June 2025, Forouhar repeatedly condemned the war while also condemning the Islamic Republic. In an essay published on 18 June 2025 she wrote, "Cursed be this devastating war. Cursed be the mighty invading army of Israel and its accomplices," and equally, "Cursed be that Islamic Republic, which led Iran and its defenceless people into this bloody disaster." She argued that the pursuit of justice could not be conflated with "bombs and rockets", writing that "one cannot be a patriot and defend a military invasion of the homeland".

Together with a group of Iranian-Germans, Forouhar filed a legal complaint against German Chancellor Friedrich Merz, who had described Israel's attack on Iran as necessary "dirty work ... for all of us". In an interview with the Protestant news agency epd she warned that "murderous attacks from outside are not an opportunity but a danger", said that Iranians "feel like hostages of the regime", and that the strikes had led to still more arrests and executions.
