= Akbar Ganji =

Iranian journalist

- اکبر گنجی
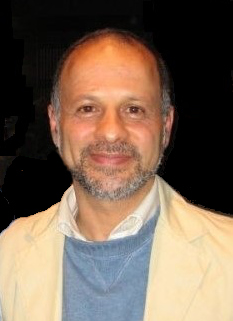
- Ganji in 2006
- Born: 31 January 1960 (age 66); Tehran, Iran
- Education: University of Tehran
- Occupations: Journalist, writer
- Awards: World Association of Newspapers' Golden Pen of Freedom Award, Martin Ennals Award for Human Rights Defenders, Milton Friedman Prize, John Humphrey Freedom Award
- Military career
- Branch: Islamic Revolutionary Guard Corps
- Service years: 1980–1984

Akbar Ganji (Persian: اکبر گنجی English pronunciation, born 31 January 1960) is an Iranian journalist, writer and a former member of Islamic Revolutionary Guard Corps. He has been described as "Iran's preeminent political dissident", and a "wildly popular pro-democracy journalist" who has crossed press censorship "red lines" regularly. A supporter of the Islamic revolution as a youth, he became disenchanted in the mid-1990s and served time in Tehran's Evin Prison from 2001 to 2006, after publishing a series of stories on the murder of dissident authors known as the chain murders of Iran. While in prison, he issued a manifesto which established him as the first "prominent dissident, believing Muslim and former revolutionary" to call for a replacement of Iran's theocratic system with "a democracy". He has been described as "Iran's best-known political prisoner".

Having been named honorary citizen of many European cities and awarded distinctions for his writing and civil, Ganji has won several international awards for his work, including the World Association of Newspapers' Golden Pen of Freedom Award, Canadian Journalists for Free Expression's International Press Freedom Award, the Martin Ennals Award for Human Rights Defenders, the Cato Institute Milton Friedman Prize for Advancing Liberty and the John Humphrey Freedom Award.

== Early life ==
Ganji grew up in a devout, impoverished family in Tehran. Active in the Islamist anti-Shah forces at a "relatively early age", he served in the Islamic Revolutionary Guard Corps during the Iran–Iraq War. He holds a master's degree in communications.

In 1994–5, Ganji became disenchanted with the government. "I saw fascism and political tyranny emerging in Iran. Anyone who asked questions was branded 'anti-revolutionary' and 'against Iran'." Ganji quit the Guard to become an investigative journalist. Shortly thereafter, he gained fame and ran afoul of the authorities by "exposing the role of high officials in sanctioning the murder of liberal dissidents".

=== Investigation of the chain murders of Iran ===
Ganji has written extensively as a journalist in a series of reformist newspapers, many of which were shut down by the Judiciary of the Islamic Republic of Iran. Possibly Ganji's most famous work was a series of articles in Saeed Hajjarian's Sobh Emrouz daily about the 1998 murders of dissident authors known as the Chain Murders of Iran. Akbar Ganji referred to the perpetrators of the killings with code names such as "Excellency Red Garmented" and their "Excellencies Gray" and the "Master Key".

Prosecutor Gholam-Hossein Mohseni-Eje'i was named by Ganji as having personally ordered the killing of activist pro-democracy journalist Pirouz Davani. Davani was allegedly abducted by plainclothes officers from Iran's Ministry of Intelligence in August 1998, one of the 80+ Iranian intellectuals murdered in the 1988–1998 chain murders of Iran.

In December 2000, after his arrest (see below), Akbar Ganji announced the "Master Key" to the chain of murders was former Intelligence Minister Hojjatoleslam Ali Fallahian. He "also denounced by name some senior clerics, including Ayatollah Mohammad Taqi Mesbah-Yazdi for having encouraged or issued fatwas, or religious orders for the assassinations". Conservatives have attacked Ganji and denied his claim.

Collections of his articles appeared in books, notably, The Dungeon of Ghosts and The Red Eminence And The Grey Eminences (Alijenob Sorkhpoosh va Alijenob-e Khakestari (2000)) focusing on the involvement of the former President of Iran, Akbar Hashemi Rafsanjani, and his Minister of Intelligence, Ali Fallahian, in the chain murders. The Red Eminence and the Grey Eminences has been described by the Washington Post newspaper in the US as "the Iranian equivalent of Aleksandr Solzhenitsyn's Gulag Archipelago". The one volume of his writings to appear in English translation is The Road to Democracy in Iran (MIT Press, April 2008).

=== Arrest and imprisonment ===
Ganji took part in a conference in Berlin held by the Heinrich Boell Foundation under the title "Iran after the elections" held in the wake of the Majlis elections of February 2000, which resulted in a huge victory by reformist candidates. The gathering was termed "anti-Islamic" and "anti-revolutionary" by Iranian state TV, IRIB, which broadcast part of the conference on 18 April 2000. Returning to Iran from the conference, he was arrested on 22 April 2000, accused of having "damaged national security." Found guilty, in January 2001, he was sentenced to ten years followed by five years of internal exile, which meant he would be kept in a specific city other than Tehran and could not leave the country. On 15 May 2001, an appeal court reduced his 10-year sentence to six months and overturned his additional sentence of five years of internal exile. However, the Tehran prosecutor challenged the appeal court decision and brought new charges against him concerning newspaper articles he had written before April 2000 and his possession of photocopies of foreign newspapers. On 16 July 2001, he was sentenced to six years imprisonment on charges of "collecting confidential information harmful to national security and spreading propaganda against the Islamic system".

Like other political prisoners before him, Ganji wrote from his prison cell. His political manifestos and open letters were smuggled out of jail and published on the internet – two letters "to the free people of the world".

In his last year in prison, Ganji went on a hunger strike for more than 80 days, from 19 May 2005 until early August 2005, except for 12 days of leave he was granted on 30 May 2005 ahead of the ninth presidential elections on 17 June 2005. His hunger strike ended after 50 days when "doctors warned he would sustain irreparable brain damage, and he relented." Many Iranians had not heard of the hunger strike due to press censorship and heavy security and information quarantine in Milad Hospital in Tehran. His hunger strike mobilized the international human rights community, "including eight former Nobel Peace laureates. Thousands of intellectuals and human rights activists worldwide spoke out on his behalf. It is generally believed that the global support generated for Ganji during this period spared his life."

He was represented by a group of lawyers, including Dr. Yousef Molaei, Abdolfattah Soltani (who was arrested and put in solitary confinement in 2005 on unknown charges), and the 2003 Nobel Peace Prize Laureate, Shirin Ebadi.

In his recent leave in June 2005, Ganji participated in interviews with several news agencies, criticizing Ayatollah Ali Khamenei, the Supreme Leader of Iran, and asking for his office to be put to a public vote. This led to a ruling by Saeed Mortazavi, the general prosecutor of Tehran, to arrest him again because of "illegal interviews". He returned to prison voluntarily on 11 June 2005 and started another hunger strike.

=== Release ===
Ganji was released from prison in poor health on 18 March 2006, after serving the full term of his six-year sentence, according to his family and various count-downs set up on many Iranian weblogs. At the same time, the deputy prosecutor of Tehran, Mahmoud Salarkia, claimed that ten days remained from his sentence due to unaccounted days of absence and that he had been granted leave for the Persian New Year. The claim has been dropped since.

In June 2006 Ganji left Iran. Since then, he has been writing and giving talks in Europe and North America, speaking out for the movement for democracy in Iran and against any U.S. military attack on his country.

== Views ==
Ganji's writings in prison were smuggled out and widely distributed, especially on the web. Most notably, he wrote a Republican Manifesto in six chapters in March 2002, laying out the basis of his proposal for a fully-fledged democratic republic for Iran. In particular, he argued that all elections in the Islamic Republic of Iran must be boycotted. He later wrote a second book of his Republican Manifesto in May 2005, ahead of the ninth Presidential elections in Iran, specifically arguing for a complete boycott of the presidential elections.

In April 2008, Ganji's first book in English appeared in Boston Review Books/MIT Press: The Road to Democracy in Iran, with an introduction by Joshua Cohen and Abbas Milani.

=== Iraq War ===
Ganji opposed the United States 2003 invasion of Iraq and subsequent occupation.

In 2006, Akbar Ganji started a tour to visit world-leading philosophers, theorists, and human rights activists. He aims to introduce Iranian intellectual movements and democratic circles to world-leading thinkers. He met many famous figures as Richard Rorty, Noam Chomsky, Anthony Giddens, David Held and Shmuel Noah Eisenstadt.

Despite repeated invitations, he refused to meet with any member of the administration of US President George W. Bush on the principle that the struggle for democracy in Iran must be waged from within the country, without foreign governmental support. He also refused to meet with White House officials, citing his belief that current US policies were not helping promote democracy in Iran. He said, "You cannot bring democracy to a country by attacking it". He also added that the war in Iraq was promoting Islamic fundamentalism and hurting movements toward democracy in the region.

Ganji declared that his role was as a dissident and journalist rather than the official voice for a specific opposition party or faction within Iran, which he explained was one reason for his refusal to meet with US political leaders and officeholders.

During his visit he criticized the Iraq War, asserting that rather than undermining the current Iranian regime, it had bolstered its capacity to repress and terrorize its population.

We do not want the regime of the Islamic Republic of Iran. However, this is our problem. Any intervention by any foreign power would bring charges of conspiracy against us. ... What has happened in Iraq did not support our movement significantly.

=== 2009 election protests ===
Ganji has strongly supported the 2009 Iranian election protests. He staged a hunger strike outside of the United Nations headquarters to highlight the plight of Iranian political prisoners, and to bring international attention to the oppressive conditions felt within Iran.

== Awards and honors ==
- PEN America, Honorary member (2000)
- Canadian Journalists for Free Expression, International Press Freedom Award (2000)
- The Middle East Studies Association of North America, MESA Academic Freedom Prize (2005)
- Press Freedom Award, Italy (2005)
- World Association of Newspapers, Golden Pen of Freedom (2006)
- Honorary citizen of the city of Florence, Italy (2006)
- Martin Ennals Award for Human Rights Defenders (2006)
- National Press Club, John Aubuchon Freedom of the Press Award (2006)
- John Humphrey Freedom Award, Rights & Democracy (2007)
- Milton Friedman Prize for Advancing Liberty (2010)
- World Press Freedom Hero, International Press Institute (2010)

== See also ==
- 2nd of Khordad Movement
- Defenders of Human Rights Center
- History of political Islam in Iran
- Human rights in Islamic Republic of Iran
- Abbas Amir-Entezam
- Abdolkarim Soroush
- Mehrangiz Kar
- Saeed Hajjarian
