= Ali Fallahian =

Iranian politician and cleric (born 1949)

- علی فلاحیان
- Fallahian in 2015

Minister of Intelligence of Iran
- In office 29 August 1989 – 20 August 1997
- President: Akbar Hashemi Rafsanjani
- Preceded by: Mohammad Reyshahri
- Succeeded by: Ghorbanali Dorri-Najafabadi

Member of the Assembly of Experts
- In office 24 February 2007 – 24 May 2016
- Constituency: Khuzestan Province
- Majority: 386,767

Personal details
- Born: 23 October 1949 (age 77) Najafabad, Isfahan, Iran
- Party: Islamic Republican Party (1979–1987)
- Education: Haghani Circle

Ali Fallahian (Persian: علی فلاحیان English pronunciation, born 1949) is an Iranian cleric, judge and politician. He was Iran's second Minister of Intelligence and Security, holding office from 1989 to 1997, during the presidency of Ali Akbar Rafsanjani.

== Early life ==
Fallahian was born in Najafabad, Iran, in 1949. He is a graduate of Haqqani school of theology in Qom. A loyal follower of Ayatollah Khomeini, he was under surveillance by the SAVAK and then imprisoned by the Shah for spreading antigovernment propaganda.

== Career ==
After the victory of the Iranian Revolution in 1979, Fallahian was appointed a judge in Islamic Revolutionary Courts, and condemned to death by hanging many former officials of the Shah's regime. From 1982 to 1984 he was a member of the Leadership of the Komitehs, while from 1984 to 1986 he served as Deputy Minister of Intelligence and Security under Minister Muhammad Reyshahri. From 1986 to 1988, Fallahian was appointed by Ruhollah Khomeini as Chief Prosecutor of the Special Court for the Clergy and led the trial against Mehdi Hashemi, while from 1988 to 1989 he was Head of the Inspectorate of the Armed Forces of Iran.

From 1989 to 1997, he served as Minister of Intelligence and Security during the presidency of Ali Akbar Rafsanjani.

Fallahian served as a member of the 3rd Assembly of Experts of the Islamic Republic of Iran. After Fallahian left office, his senior deputy, Saeed Emami, was arrested for the murders of four dissidents in 1998 and 1999, Emami subsequently died in prison in what the authorities declared a suicide. Fallahian began to work in the office of the Supreme Leader, Ali Khamenei.

=== Presidential candidacy ===
Fallahian was a candidate in the 2001 presidential election, which was won by incumbent reformist Mohammad Khatami. Fallahian came in sixth place, receiving 0.2 percent of the vote; some observers have hypothesized that Fallahian only entered the election in an effort to clear his name, which has been associated with murder and political suppression.

On 19 February 2013, in Birjand, Fallahian announced his candidacy for the Iranian presidential election, saying that "people's requests to me [had] reached a threshold". Running with the campaign slogan of "Advanced Islamic Country", he said that his top priority would be the economy, focusing on fighting inflation and lowering the unemployment rate. He specified that he planned on continuing the subsidy reform plan.

Regarding diplomatic relations with the United States, he implied that he would seek improved ties, even suggesting to put an end to the uranium enrichment program, saying "enough of nuclear", as Iran had "already mastered its knowledge". He added that he envisioned chances for cooperation between the two countries, especially in creating stability in Afghanistan, Iraq, Tunisia, and Egypt. His nomination was rejected by the Guardian Council.

== Accusations ==
Fallahian is currently on the official wanted list of Interpol in connection with the bombing of the Asociación Mutual Israelita Argentina (AMIA), a Jewish Community Center in Buenos Aires, Argentina, on 18 July 1994, that killed 85 people. The Interpol issued a red notice for him and other suspects for their alleged roles in the attack in March 2007. The arrest warrant is based on the allegation that senior Iranian officials planned the attack in an August 1993 meeting, including Khamanei, the Supreme Leader, Mohammad Hejazi, the then Khamanei's intelligence and security advisor, Rafsanjani, then president, Fallahian, then intelligence minister, and Ali Akbar Velayati, then foreign minister.

In addition, he was the subject of an international arrest warrant issued in 1997 in connection with the murder of three Kurdish-Iranian opposition leaders in the Mykonos restaurant assassinations in Berlin. Fallahian is under an international warrant issued in 1996 by a German court because of his role in the assassinations. Sadeq Sharafkandi from Kurdistan Democratic Party of Iran and three of his colleagues were assassinated September 1992 in Berlin by Iranian-Lebanese agents. Fallahian was also the most prominent member of a group of five Iranians and Lebanese for whom international arrest warrants issued in March 2007.

He was also named by investigative reporter Akbar Ganji as the "master key" of the 1998 "Chain Murders" of four dissident Iranian intellectuals. In December 2000, appearing before an Islamic Revolutionary Court, investigative reporter Akbar Ganji "ending months of guessing and expectations from both the authorities and the public" when he announced the "Master Key" to the chain murders of four dissident Iranian intellectuals was Fallahian.

Fallahian is also charged by a Swiss court with masterminding the assassination of Kazem Rajavi, a brother of Mujahedin-e Khalq leader Massoud Rajavi, near Geneva in broad daylight by several agents on 24 April 1990. An international arrest warrant has been issued against him and as a result, he is unable to leave the country.

== See also ==
- Chain murders of Iran

Political offices
Preceded by Mohammad Reyshahri	Minister of Intelligence of Iran; 1989–1997	Succeeded by Ghorbanali Dorri-Najafabadi
