= Pirouz Davani =

Iranian activist

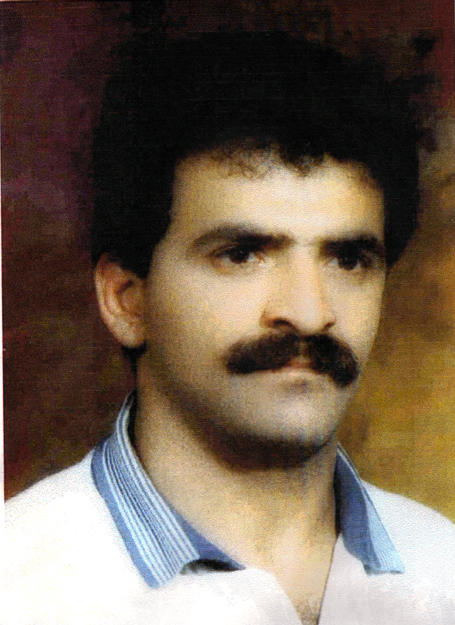
- Pirouz Davani
- Born: 1961; Imperial State of Iran
- Disappeared: 28 August 1998 (age 37); Tehran, Iran
- Status: Missing for 28 years, 1 month and 22 days

Pirouz Davani (Persian: پیروز دوانی; 1961–1998~) is, or was, an Iranian leftist activist and editor of the Pirouz (Persian: "Victorious") newspaper. He disappeared on 28 August 1998 while leaving his residence in Tehran. Some have suggested that Davani was murdered.

== Early career ==
Pirouz Davani joined the Iranian Revolution against the Pahlavi dynasty as a youth. After the revolution succeeded he was arrested in 1981 "for his alleged links to the communist opposition" and was imprisoned.

Following the 1988 mass execution of political prisoners, he is reported to have launched a campaign against the government. "In winter of 1991, Pirooz was again arrested for his activities and after spending six months in solitary confinement, was sentenced to four years in prison. He was released from prison in 1995".

Following the election of president Mohammad Khatami, he "established a cultural institute to publish and promote new interpretation of left's struggle for democracy in Iran", which "lead to creation of the Organisation of Unity for Democracy in Iran."

He later established the Pirouz newspaper which was openly critical of the Government.

== Disappearance ==
In September 1998, Davani's brother Majid announced that Davani had been "abducted" by "plainclothes officers" from Iran's Ministry of Intelligence.

Davani is thought to have been a victim of Iran's "chain murders" of Iranian dissidents, though his body has never been recovered and no records of imprisonment have ever been published. His disappearance occurred several months before the murders of four other Iranian dissidents in November 1998. Prosecutor Gholam-Hossein Mohseni-Eje'i was named by journalist Akbar Ganji as having personally ordered the killing of Davani.

In December 1998, Amnesty International issued a public statement that they had received reports that Davani's mother had been contacted anonymously and told her son had been killed. According to unconfirmed reports at the time, she suffered a fatal heart attack upon hearing the news.

In November 2004, Reporters Without Borders reported:

The intelligence ministry officially recognized in January 1999 that some of its agents were involved and announced dozens of arrests. Fifteen intelligence ministry agents were convicted in January 2001 for the murder of the Forouhars. Three were sentenced to death. The other 12 received prison sentences. Three other suspects were acquitted. The Supreme Court upheld the verdict but only two persons were sentenced to 15 years in prison. The authorities never tried to establish the circumstances of Davani's disappearance...

== See also ==
- Chain murders of Iran
- List of kidnappings
- List of people who disappeared mysteriously: post-1970
- Ministry of Intelligence of Iran
