= Saeed Emami =

Iranian intelligence official (1958–1999)

- Saeed Emami
- Born: Saeed Emami; 14 January 1958; Shiraz, Iran
- Died: 19 June 1999 (aged 41); Lugman Hospital, Tehran, Iran
- Cause of death: Suicide by poisoning
- Spouse: Fahimeh Dorri Nogorani
- Espionage activity
- Allegiance: Islamic Republic of Iran
- Service branch: Ministry of Intelligence
- Service years: 1984–1999
- Codename: Daniyal Ghavami
- Operations: "Chain murders"

Saeed Emami (Persian: سعید امامی; né Saeed Eslami) (14 January 1958 – 19 June 1999) was the Iranian deputy minister of intelligence under Ali Fallahian, and adviser to Ghorbanali Dorri-Najafabadi. He was appointed as deputy minister in security affairs and the second person of intelligence ministry when he was 32 years old. He is also considered as the designer and leader of many internal and extraterritorial intelligence operations during the 1990s, especially in the case of western countries, Israel and anti-revolutionary units. He was accused of having independently organized the assassinations of dissidents (known as the "chain murders").

== Biography ==
Emami was born in Abadeh, near Shiraz, Iran. In 1978, he moved to the United States with the help of his uncle, Soltan Mohammad Etemad, to pursue his studies in mechanical engineering.

Following the Iranian Revolution, he returned to Iran and became involved in intelligence gathering. In 1984, when the Majlis of Iran (Iranian Parliament) approved the establishment of the Ministry of Intelligence of Iran, he joined the ministry and worked at the foreign directorate during Mohammad Reyshahri's term. Later he was appointed deputy minister during the tenure of Ali Fallahian. He was also the director of the ministry's security directorate.

=== Background ===
Some sources claimed that Emami was of Jewish origin, but Ali Fallahian believes that "they just wanted to justify his arrest and torture". According to Hamshahri, he was the first Holocaust denier in the Islamic Republic.

== Arrest and death ==
In 1999, after being charged with orchestrating the Chain Murders, Emami was arrested and imprisoned. According to Muhammad Sahimi:

On 20 June 1999, it was announced that Saeid Emami had died in prison the night before. It was claimed that Emami had attempted to commit suicide by drinking a depilatory compound in the bathroom on 16 June 1999. He had been taken to a hospital and had undergone treatment, but had died on 19 June. It was claimed that he died of a cardiac arrest and because he suffered from respiratory problems. His family held a memorial service for him in which 400 people participated.

Iranian dissidents are reported to believe "he was murdered in order to prevent the leak of sensitive information about MOIS operations, which would have compromised the entire leadership of the Islamic Republic."

He was later alleged to have assisted in the defection of Abolghassem Farhad Mesbahi, a former Iranian intelligence official. Mesbahi stated he fled Iran in 1996 after his former colleague Emami warned him of an assassination order against him. Mesbahi was offered asylum in Germany where he was a witness in the Mykonos restaurant assassinations trial, contributing to a German court ruling blaming Iranian government officials for the attack and issuing an arrest warrant for former Iranian Intelligence Minister Fallahian. It was implied that Emami's arrest was at least in part for this action.

== See also ==
- Dariush Forouhar
- Ali-Akbar Sa'idi Sirjani
