= Hamid Hajizadeh =

Iranian poet

- Born: 1950
- Died: September 22, 1998 (aged 47–48)

Hamid Hajizadeh (Persian: حمید حاجی‌زاده; b. 1950 – d. 22 September 1998) was a contemporary Iranian poet who wrote under the pen name "Sahar". He was murdered along with his 9 year-old son on 22 September 1998 in Kerman, Iran, which was part of a series of killings of writers known as the "Chain murders".

== Biography ==
Hamid Pour Hajizadeh ("Sahar") was born in 1950 in the city of Bezenjan, located in Kerman province. He earned an associate degree in literature from Kerman Rahnamaiye University, at which time his literary activity flourished. He began to compose poetry and his work would frequently perform well in competitions. He also helped to improve the status of the youth literature community in Shiraz. After the Iranian Revolution Hajizadeh continued his education, studying law at Tehran's Shahid Beheshti University, but some post-revolution turmoil prevented him from completing the program. Eventually he earned a bachelor's degree in Persian literature from Shahid Bahonar University and then became a teacher in Kerman. During this time he continued his independent literary pursuits and developed his research. In 1981 he married Rouhangir Sultaninejad, with whom he had three sons.

== Death ==
Hamid Hajizadeh and his son Karoun were murdered some time in the night of September 22, 1998. A detailed report on Hajizadeh's murder was published by Mohammad Hajizadeh, his brother. The report read: "...the government physician noted 27 stab wounds on my brother's chest, from below his throat to below his navel, and ten stab wounds on Karoun's chest... blunt trauma to their heads, puncturing of the heart, lungs, and intestinal tract, and skinning of Hamid's fingers on his right hand from which the physician deduced that Hamid grabbed the assailant's knife multiple times during the attack, resulting in deep gashes in his palm. Those who were at the mortuary or otherwise saw Karoun's body mentioned stab marks around his ear, face, and back, the latter of which must have been the cause of his punctured heart, lungs, and stomach... the murder was planned with military precision. In two or three days we realized what was going on!"

== See also ==
- List of unsolved murders (1980–1999)

== Bibliography ==
- Inquiry into Opium (three volumes)
- The Culture and Folklore of Bezenjan and Lak
- Other Rhythms and Other Rhymes
- Analysis of a Few Words
- Arrays of Literature
- Lost Pieces in the Music of Persian Poetry
- Karoun is in me
- Many do not fall in love
- Lost Anthems
- In memory of the simple old lady from eternal Bezenjan
- A father without you in the end of night
