= Parvaneh Forouhar =

Iranian activist (1939–1998)

- پروانه‌ فروهر
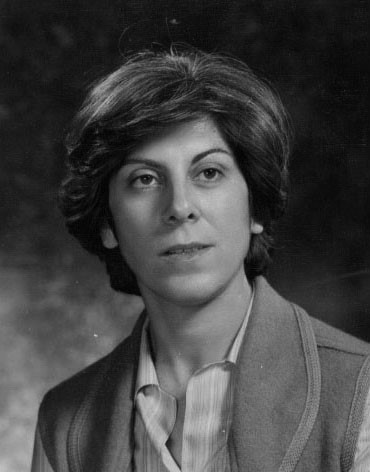
- Born: Parvaneh Majd Eskandari; 20 March 1939; Tehran, Iran
- Died: 22 November 1998 (aged 59); Tehran, Iran
- Cause of death: Murder by stabbing
- Resting place: Behesht-e Zahra
- Occupation: Teacher
- Political party: Party of the Iranian Nation
- Spouse: Dariush Forouhar (m. 1961)
- Children: 2, including Parastou

Parvaneh Forouhar (Persian: پروانه‌ فروهر, née Eskandari (اسکندری); 20 March 1939 – 22 November 1998) was an Iranian dissident and activist who was murdered along with her husband Dariush Forouhar during the chain murders of Iran in 1998.

== Biography ==
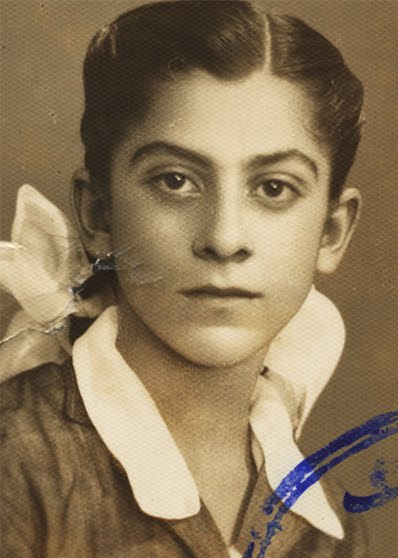
Parvaneh Eskandari

Parvaneh Forouhar was Dariush Forouhar's wife. When they married, their witness in absentia was Dr. Mohammad Mossadegh and the clergyman marrying the couple was Ayatollah Zanjani. She became a member of the Party of the Iranian Nation when she was a university student, launching an anti-Shah campaign alongside her husband.

Both husband and wife were proponents of a democratic and independent Iran and supported the separation of state and religion. They felt that the Islamic Republic led to a concentration of power and made political reform difficult.

Threatened by governments figures, she had told human rights watchdogs based in New York: "We are living with the fear of being killed. Every night when we go to bed we thank God the Almighty for His blessing of living for another day."

== Murder ==
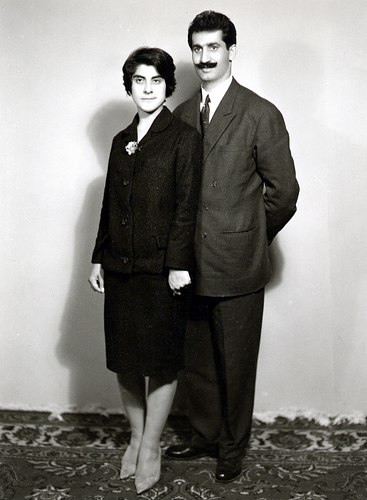
Dariush and Parvaneh Forouhar

On November 22, 1998, while 59 years old and ill, Parvaneh was stabbed 25 times and killed on the second floor of her home. Her husband, Darius Forouhar, was also murdered in the incident.

According to Parvanah's daughter (Parastou), "At the time of her death my mother was wearing an overall over her sleeping gown which indicates that she was not waiting for anyone and because she was killed in front of the wardrobe where family documents were usually kept, she had most probably gone upstairs to fetch the deeds of the house to use it for release of my father on bail."

=== Context ===
The killing of Parvaneh Eskandari Forouhar and Dariush Forouhar was followed a few days later by the assassinations of Mohammad Mokhtari and Mohammad-Ja'far Pouyandeh, two well known Iranian writers. The Iranian Ministry of Intelligence later denied responsibility for these assassinations and claimed Ministry employees had acted on their own accord. As of 2014, the government had refused to allow the families of the victims to hold any vigils or ceremonies for their loved ones.

== Family ==
The couple is survived by a daughter, Parastou Forouhar and a son, Arash Forouhar.

== See also ==
- 1988 executions of Iranian political prisoners
- Chain murders of Iran
- List of Iranian women
