= Ebrahim Zalzadeh =

Iranian author (1948–1997)

- Born: 1948; Iran
- Died: February 22, 1997 (aged 48–49); Tehran, Iran
- Cause of death: Stab wounds
- Occupations: Author, editor
- Known for: Murder victim

Ebrahim Zalzadeh (c. 1948 – February 22, 1997) was a dissident Iranian author and editor who was murdered in 1997 in what is thought to have been one of the "chain murders" of dissidents by "rogue elements" in Iran's intelligence ministry.

== Background ==
Zalzadeh was editor of the Iranian literary monthly Mayar (also spelled Me'yer), a publication that frequently criticized Iranian government censorship practices against the media, and was forced to close by the authorities in 1995. Zalzadeh oversaw the publishing companies of Bamdad ("Dawn") and Ebtekar ("Initiative").

"Dictatorship will not continue," Ebrahim Zalzadeh wrote in his final editorial to the supreme leader of the Iranian regime, Ayatollah Akbar Hashemi Rafsanjani and he is remembered for that.

Iran's formidable intelligence agencies banned Me'yar after the critical editorial and later kidnapped and executed Ebrahim Zalzadeh. Zalzadeh disappeared on February 22, 1997, and was identified in a Tehran morgue on March 29. According to the coroner's report, his body was discovered half-buried and with multiple stab wounds in the chest, on or about February 24 by a road in the outskirts of Tehran. He was in a Tehran morgue on March 29, 35 days after he had been reported missing.

"Zalzadeh was one of several Iranian writers and publishers who had volunteered to share the punishment of magazine editor Abbas Maroufi, who was sentenced in January 1996 to six months in prison and 35 lashes for criticizing the government."

== See also ==
- Lists of solved missing person cases
- List of unsolved murders (1980–1999)

== Sources ==
- Freedom Forum Jourists Memorial EBRAHIM ZALZADEH
- CJP Journalists Killed in 1997: Ebrahim Zalzadeh, Mayar, February 22, 1997, Tehran
