= Rovshan Aliyev =

- Born: 1955; Agstafa, Azerbaijani SSR, USSR
- Died: 13 March 2002 (aged 46–47); Baku, Azerbaijan
- Occupation: Criminal investigator

Rovshan Aliyev (Azerbaijani: Rövşən Əliyev; born 1955 in Agstafa, Azerbaijan SSR, USSR – 13 March 2002 in Baku, Azerbaijan) was an Azerbaijani criminalist and deputy chief of Prosecutor's Office Grave Crimes Investigation Department. From his office in the Palace of Justice in Baku, Azerbaijan, he spent most of his professional life trying to overthrow the power of the Azerbaijani mafia.

== Biography ==
After graduating from Azerbaijan State University Law and Justice in 1972, and worked as prosecutor in Baku's Nasimi district in 1977. He was Azerbaijan's first military prosecutor and played vital role in establishment of this role in the country.

In 2005, Haji Mammadov was arrested during operation Black Belt and convicted of murdering Aliyev.

== See also ==
- Fatulla Huseynov
