= Mohammad Mokhtari (writer) =

Iranian writer (1942–1998)

Mohammad Mokhtari محمد مختاری
- Born: April 21, 1942; Mashhad, Iran
- Died: December 3, 1998 (aged 56); Aminabad, Firuzkuh, Iran
- Occupation: Writer
- Known for: Activist
- Spouse: Maryam Hosseinzade
- Children: 2

Mohammad Mokhtari (Persian: محمد مختاری) (April 21, 1942 – December 3, 1998) was an Iranian writer, poet and left-wing activist. He was an active member of the Iranian Writers Association, a group that had been long banned in Iran due to their objection to censorship and encouraged freedom of expression. Due to his activism, he was most likely murdered during the Chain murders of Iran in December 1998.

== Biography ==
Mohammad Mokhtari was born in Mashhad. He graduated from Ferdowsi University of Mashhad in 1969, majoring in Persian Language and Literature. He married in 1972 and had two sons.

In 1973, Mokhtari joined the literary foundation of Ferdowsi’s Shahnameh and soon became a member of its scientific committee. From 1979 until the beginning of the Cultural Revolution, Mokhtari taught at the School of Dramatic Arts (today’s School of Cinema and Theatre) of University of Tehran. He translated the Russian poetry of Anna Akhmatova and Vladimir Mayakovsky.

In 1981, he was the secretary of the Iranian Writers’ Association for one year. He was arrested in 1982 for political reasons and imprisoned for two years and at this time he was also permanently banned from working for the Iranian government. From 1986, he was on the editorial board of the Donya-ye Sokhan magazine. He also had close ties with other publications such as Takapu. Mokhtari played a key role in the re-opening of the Iranian Writers’ Association. He was a long-time member of the Association and a central figure in the Third Iranian Writers’ Association. According to friends and acquaintances, he worked eagerly for the achievement of the goals of the Association, and followed its projects with patience and perseverance; his constructive and helpful criticism proved vital for the Association (Asr-e No). He also played a crucial part in the writing and publication of a letter, dated October 15, 1994, in which 134 writers stated their objection to censorship and restraints on the freedom of expression. Mokhtari was a successful researcher and respected poet and he had published several books of poetry, as well as a book on mythology.

=== Death ===
On December 3, 1998, Mokhtari left his house for shopping and never returned. The next day, police officers of Aminabad found an unidentified body in an uninhabited area of Aminabad, on the estate of a cement factory, near the road to Firuzabad (near Tehran City). There was nothing to help identify the body, other than a pen and a piece of paper. The body was transferred to the police station’s forensic team. On December 10 (the International Human Rights Day), one week after his disappearance, the body was identified at the morgue and his family remarked that there appeared to be bruising around his neck.

He died on December 3, 1998, of suffocation. His death came only a few days after the death of Iranian political activists, Parvaneh Eskandari Forouhar and her husband, Dariush Forouhar and the assassination of writer Mohammad-Ja'far Pouyandeh. The Iranian Ministry of Intelligence later denied responsibility for the Mokhtari death and claimed a "foreign network" may have assassinated him.

== See also ==
- Chain murders of Iran
- 1988 executions of Iranian political prisoners
