= Fatulla Huseynov =

Azerbaijani police officer

- In office 1988–1995
- Preceded by: office established

Personal details
- Born: December 21, 1937 Tovuz, Azerbaijan SSR, Soviet Union
- Died: June 14, 2004 (aged 66) Baku, Azerbaijan

Military service
- Branch/service: Ministry of Internal Affairs of Azerbaijan
- Years of service: 7
- Rank: Colonel

Fatulla Ali oghlu Huseynov (Azerbaijani: Fətulla Əli oğlu Hüseynov; Fevral 15, 1937 – June 14, 2004) was the colonel of the Ministry of Internal Affairs of Azerbaijan from shortly after Azerbaijan's independence in the early 1990s and one of the influential public figures in Azerbaijan until his death.

== Career ==
Huseynov was the chief of the traffic police under the Interior Ministry in the late 1970s. Later he left his post and returned only in the late 1980s and was appointed police chief of Nasimi district of Baku. He then worked as chief of the Baku police for nearly two years.

In the early 1990s, he headed the public security directorate under the Ministry of Internal Affairs of Azerbaijan. He also participated in the First Nagorno-Karabakh War within Interior Ministry subunits, where he received the nickname the “Black Colonel” for his unit's military feats.

Lately, Huseynov was a member of the board of the Association of Football Federations of Azerbaijan and was its vice-president. He was one of the leaders of Azerbaijan's opposition Justice Party.

== Death ==
He was shot and killed outside his Baku home on June 14, 2004. The perpetrator was unknown, though believed to be figures within the government of Azerbaijan until 2013. In 2005, Haji Mammadov was arrested during operation Black Belt and convicted of murdering Huseynov.

== See also ==
- Rovshan Aliyev
