= Ali-Akbar Sa'idi Sirjani =

Iranian academic, writer, and journalist (1931–1994)

- علی‌اکبر سعیدی سیرجانی
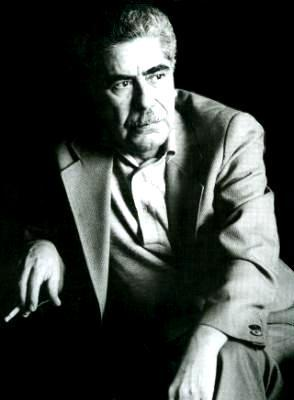
- Born: 12 December 1931; Sirjan, Kerman province, Iran
- Died: 28 November 1994 (aged 62); Tehran, Iran
- Occupations: Writer, poet, journalist
- Spouse: Mehrangiz Zarandi
- Children: 3

Ali-Akbar Sa'idi Sirjani (Persian: علی‌اکبر سعیدی سیرجانی; 12 December 1931 – 28 November 1994) was an Iranian University professor, writer, poet, and journalist who died in prison under mysterious circumstances after having been arrested for openly criticizing the government. He is widely believed to have been killed at the hands of the Islamic Republic intelligence ministry for criticism of Iran's Supreme Leader.

== Political activity ==
Saidi Sirjani was a disillusioned supporter of the Islamic Revolution who used satirical and allegorical stories to criticize the Islamic Republic for what he saw as its "authoritarianism, religious hypocrisy, and obtrusive meddling in people's personal lives." His first open confrontation with the authorities came following the publication of a book of essays, stories, and parables called You of Shortened Sleeves in 1989. The first printing sold out in days and the Ministry of Culture and Islamic Guidance banned not only the second printing but all other books by Sirjani.

Sirjani then initiated a letter-writing campaign, demanding that a second printing be released. Iran's Supreme Leader, Ayatollah Ali Khamenei, then told Sirjani through intermediaries to halt his writings and his protestations. Sirjani refused and "directly assailed the Islamic Republic in an open letter." According to Iranian scholar Ahmad Karimi-Hakkak, this 'letter sealed the author's fate in a way that no previous writing of his ... had done.'

== Arrest ==
Saidi-Sirjani was arrested on 14 March 1994 (another source says 13 March 1993) and charged with openly criticizing the government, among other things. A spokesperson for the Iranian Ministry of Security and Intelligence claimed that the arrest was for "drug use, production of alcohol, homosexual activity, contacts with spy networks, and having received money from Western counterrevolutionaries" which majority of Iranians knew at the time to be a false accusation. A few months later a letter purportedly "written by Sirjani himself admitted to a range of crimes against the state, but even then everyone knew the confession was not written by him."

His arrest became "a rallying point" for disparate factions of "expatriate Iranian intellectuals, academics," who came together "as never before." Letters of protest were dispatched to various political and professional organizations in Europe and the United States. Organizations such as Amnesty International, the American PEN, Human Rights Watch, and the Middle East Studies Association, as well as many European associations of writers.

== Death ==
The international human rights campaign failed to secure Saidi-Sirjani's release, however, and he died in custody 8 months after his arrest, on 28 November 1994, reportedly at one of the safe houses of the Intelligence Ministry in Shemiran neighborhood in northern Tehran. Iranian authorities gave the cause of his death as a heart attack, although his daughter, Sayeh Sirjani, said her father had no history of heart ailments. The Sirjani family had also repeatedly denied allegations that he was addicted to drugs. The Government is reported to have "refused to deliver his body to his family or to allow an independent autopsy."

It is widely believed and there is some evidence that he was killed by Saeed Emami's "Unleashed" group at the Ministry of Security and Intelligence. According to journalist Emadeddin Baqi, the method used to kill him was potassium.

One of Saeed Emami's colleagues and one of the last persons arrested, met a known clergyman and Majlis deputy from Tehran a few months before his arrest and revealed how Saeed Emami had murdered Saeedi Sirjani. He was the only witness present on the scene. Forcing a potassium suppository into the rectum of Saeedi Sirjani which caused a rapid heart attack was the method used by Saeed Emami to kill Saeedi Sirjani in the prison. This revealed the secret of other similar heart attacks.

Iranian journalist Afshin Molavi speculated that Sirjani was killed for crossing "the red line" from "writer and thinker to rebel." While the Islamic Republic would "grudgingly allowed allegorical criticism read by an elite," it took punitive action when the criticism became widely popular, when citizens disobeyed orders to stop protest and finally when they wrote "open letters to newspapers questioning the Supreme Leader."

== Personal life ==
Sirjani married Mehrangiz Zarandi, and they had three children.

== See also ==
- Chain murders of Iran
- List of unsolved murders (1980–1999)
