= Majid Sharif =

Iranian translator and journalist

- Born: January/February 1951
- Died: November 19, 1998 (aged 47); Tehran
- Occupations: Translator, journalist
- Movement: Shariatism
- Spouse: Mahshid Sharif
- Children: 1

Majid Sharif (Persian: مجید شریف; January/February 1951– November 19, 1998) was an Iranian translator and journalist who was one of the victims of the Chain murders of Iran. He was a follower of the late Islamist modernist leftist theoretician Ali Shariati. Articles by him criticizing Iranian government policies appeared in a monthly magazine, Iran-e Farda (Iran of Tomorrow), which was closed down by court order on December 5, 1998.

== Education ==
Sharif graduated from Sharif University of Technology in Iran and was a student in Physics Department of University of California at Los Angeles before his return to Iran.

== Death ==
In November 1998, Sharif left his home for a jog and never returned. On November 19, 1998 he was found on the side of a road in Tehran and identified by his mother in the coroner's office six days later on November 25, 1998. The official cause of his death was given as heart failure.

== See also ==
- Chain murders of Iran
- Human rights in Iran
