= Chain murders of Iran =

1988–98 murders and disappearances of Iranian dissidents

- Location: Iran
- Date: 1988–1998
- Target: Opposition figures, leaders, intellectuals, etc.
- Attack type: Extra-judicial killings
- Deaths: 80+
- Perpetrator: SAVAMA
- Motive: To block opposition and reformist movements

Victims of chain murders

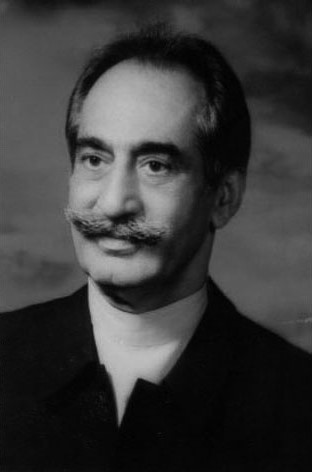
Dariush Forouhar

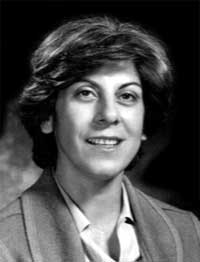
Parvaneh Forouhar

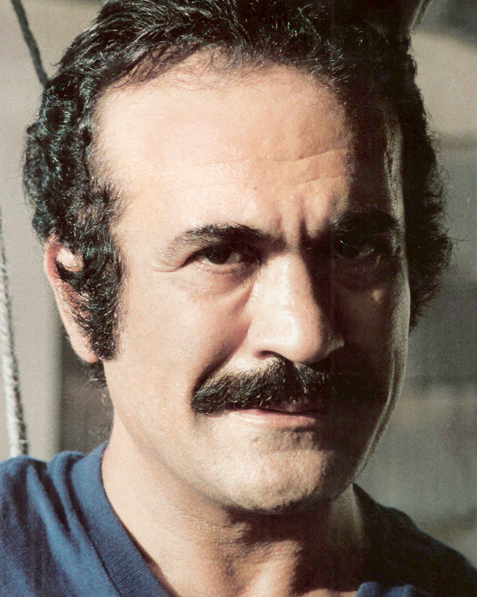
Fereydoun Farrokhzad

Shapour Bakhtiar

The chain murders of Iran (Persian: قتل‌های زنجیره‌ای ایران) were a series of 1988–98 murders and disappearances of certain Iranian dissident intellectuals who had been critical of the Islamic Republic system. The murders and disappearances were carried out by Iranian government internal operatives. They were referred to as "chain murders" because they appeared to be linked to each other.

The victims included more than 80 writers, translators, poets, political activists, and ordinary citizens. They were killed by a variety of means such as car crashes, stabbings, shootings in staged robberies, and injections with potassium to simulate a heart attack. The pattern of murders did not come to light until late 1998 when Dariush Forouhar, his wife Parvaneh Eskandari Forouhar, and three dissident writers were murdered over a span of two months.

After the murders were publicized, Supreme Leader Ayatollah Khamenei denied the government was responsible, and blamed "Iran's enemies". In mid-1999, after great public outcry and journalistic investigation in Iran and publicity abroad, Iranian prosecutors announced they had found the perpetrator. One Saeed Emami had led "rogue elements" in Iran's MOIS Intelligence Ministry in the killings, but that Emami was now dead, having committed suicide in prison. In a trial that was "dismissed as a sham by the victims' families and international human rights organisations", three Intelligence Ministry agents were sentenced in 2001 to death and 12 others to prison terms for murdering two of the victims.

Many Iranians and foreigners believe the killings were part of an attempt to resist the cultural and political openness of reformist Iranian president Mohammad Khatami and his supporters, and that those convicted of the killings were actually "scapegoats acting on orders from high within the ministry", with the ultimate perpetrators including "a few well known clerics."

In turn, Iran's hardliners—the group most closely associated with vigilante attacks on dissidents in general, and with the accused killers in particular—claimed foreign powers (including Israel) had committed the crimes.

The murders are said to be "still shrouded in secrecy", and an indication that the authorities may not have uncovered all perpetrators of the chain murders was the attempted assassination of Saeed Hajjarian, a newspaper editor who is thought to have played a "key role" in uncovering the killings. On March 12, 2000, Hajjarian was shot in the head and left paralyzed for life.

== History of chain murders ==
=== Killings ===
The term "chain murders" was first used to describe the murder of six people in late 1998. The first two killed were 70-year-old Dariush Forouhar (secretary general of the opposition party, the Nation of Iran Party), and his wife Parvaneh Eskandari, whose mutilated bodies were found in their south Tehran home on 22 November 1998. Forouhar received 11 knife wounds and Eskandari 24. Their home, which was later ransacked, was thought to be under 24-hour surveillance by the Ministry of Intelligence and National Security of Iran, thus casting suspicion on that ministry for at least complicity in the murder.

On 2 December 1998, Mohammad Mokhtari, an Iranian writer, left his residence and did not return home. A week later his body was identified at the coroner's office. The next to disappear was Mohammad Jafar Pouyandeh, an author and "one of the most active translators of the country," whose body was discovered four days after leaving his office on 8 December. Pooyandeh and Mokhtari's bodies were both found around Shahriar, a "mini-city" in the south of Tehran, and both had apparently been strangled. On the day Pooyandeh's body was found, 12 December 1998, fifty writers called on President Khatami to find the perpetrators of the killings.

In the meantime, other suspicious and unsolved murders of dissidents over the previous decade were put forward by reformers as connected: Ahmad Miralaee, Ebrahim Zalzadeh, Ghafar Hosseini, Manouchehr Saneie and his wife Firoozeh Kalantari, and Ahmad Tafazzoli. The body of Majid Sharif (a translator and journalist who contributed to the banned publication Iran-e-Farda) was found on the side of a Tehran road on 18 November 1998, three days before the discovery of the bodies of Dariush Forouhar and his wife Parvaneh Eskandari. His official cause of death was "heart failure."

In the summer of 1996, there had been an unsuccessful attempt to kill a busload of 21 writers en route to a poetry conference in Armenia. At two in the morning, while most of his passengers were sleeping, the driver of the bus attempted to steer the bus off a cliff near the Heyran Pass. "When the driver tried to jump out to save himself, a passenger grabbed the wheel and steered the bus back onto the road." The driver tried it a second time, "diving out of the vehicle just as it careened toward the edge of the 1,000-foot free fall." The bus hit a boulder and stopped, saving the lives of 21 writers. The driver ran away. The passengers were taken to a nearby Caspian town by authorities, interrogated, and warned "to discuss the event with no one."

The person thought to be the first victim was Kazem Sami Kermani, an "Islamic nationalist and physician" who had opposed the Shah and served as Minister of Health in the brief post-revolutionary provisional government of Prime Minister Mehdi Bazargan. He was later a member of the first Majles where he criticized the government for its continuation of the Iran–Iraq War after the Liberation of Khorramshahr. He was murdered on 23 November 1988 in his clinic in Tehran by an axe-wielding assailant.

=== Alleged perpetrators ===
On 20 December 1998, a statement was issued in Tehran by a group calling itself "pure Mohammadan Islam devotees of Mostafa Navvab" taking credit for at least some of the killings. The statement attacked reformists and said in part:

"Now that domestic politicians, through negligence and leniency, and under slogan of rule of law, support the masked poisonous vipers of the aliens, and brand the decisive approaches of the Islamic system, judiciary and responsible press and advocates of the revolution as monopolistic and extremist spread of violence and threats to the freedom, the brave and zealous children of the Iranian Muslim nation took action and by revolutionary execution of dirty and sold-out elements who were behind nationalistic movements and other poisonous moves in universities, took the second practical step in defending the great achievements of the Islamic Revolution … The revolutionary execution of Dariush Forouhar, Parvaneh Eskandari, Mohammad Mokhtari and Mohammad Jafar Pouyandeh is a warning to all mercenary writers and their counter-value supporters who are cherishing the idea of spreading corruption and promiscuity in the country and bringing back foreign domination over Iran..."

Iran's conservative Supreme Leader Ayatollah Ali Khamenei, the highest ranking political and religious authority in Iran, speculated as to the perpetrators. Khamenei blamed foreign powers, stating "the enemy was creating insecurity to try to block the progress of Iran's Islamic system." Foreign correspondents believed the main suspects were likely to be conservatives opposed to Iran's more moderate President Mohammad Khatami reform agenda. In Iran, conservative daily newspapers also blamed "foreign sources intend on creating an environment of insecurity and instability in the country," for the killings.

On 4 January 1999, the public relations office of the Ministry of Information "unexpectedly" issued a short press release claiming "staff within" its own Ministry "committed these criminal activities … under the influence of undercover rogue agents":

"The despicable and abhorring recent murders in Tehran are a sign of chronic conspiracy and a threat to the national security. The Information Ministry based on their legal obligations and following clear directives issued by the Supreme Leader and the President, made the discovery and uprooting of this sinister and threatening event the priority action for the Ministry. With the cooperation of the specially appointed Investigatory committee of the President, the Ministry has succeeded to identify the group responsible for the killings, has arrested them and processed their cases through the judicial system. Unfortunately a small number of irresponsible, misguided, headstrong and obstinate staff within the Ministry of Information who are no doubt under the influence of undercover rogue agents and act towards the objectives of foreign and estranged sources committed these criminal activities".

Saeed Emami or Islami, the deputy security official of the Ministry of Information, and his colleagues and subordinate staff, Mehrdad Alikhani, Mostafa Kazemi and Khosro Basati, were arrested for the dissident murders.

According to Indymedia UK, "the agent named as the mastermind behind the assassinations, Saeed Emami, was reported to have killed himself in prison by drinking a bottle of hair remover."

Defendant Ali Rowshani admitted murdering Mokhtari and Pouyandeh. But he said he had done so under orders from Mostafa Kazemi, a former head of internal security at the intelligence ministry and another man, Merhdad Alikhani. Another pair of defendants admitted killing the Forouhars, a husband and wife found dead at home from multiple stab wounds. They too said they had received orders from Kazemi and Alikhani. Another man said he had assisted in the murder. Kazemi was reported telling the court on Saturday he had been the mastermind behind the killings, while Alikhani said the decision was taken "collectively."

The Iranian press reported that Emami was not only responsible for the deaths of Forouhar, Mokhtari, Pooyandeh and Sharif, but also earlier killings in the 1980s and 1990s of Saidi Sirjani, the Mykonos restaurant assassinations, the unsuccessful 1995 attempt to stage a bus accident in the mountains and kill 21 writers, and the unexpected death of Ahmad Khomeini, (Ayatollah Khomeini's son). Human rights activist Shirin Ebadi claims Emami's "friends reported that he belonged to a notorious gang of hard-core religious extremists who believed that the enemies of Islam should be killed."

Saeed Emami's arrest was not revealed, however, until 3 June 1999, six months after his reported suicide. Several facts added to skepticism over whether the true culprits of the murders had been found and justice done, namely: Emami was believed to have had "round-the-clock" surveillance while in prison, being the prime suspect of a serial political murder case that aroused the whole country; hair-removal cream available in Iran is unlikely to be lethal when ingested; that Emami's confession was not considered evidence and made public by the presiding judge who deemed it "unrelated to the case;" that

no photos of the agents of the Ministry of Intelligence tried in Dec 2000 – Jan 2001 were published, their identity remained a "state secret". Most Iranians are convinced their "confessions" are part of a deal to allow them freedom after the trials, irrespective of the verdict.

and

There are conflicting reports on the manner of [Emami's] suicide. His body or its photograph have never been publicly seen and even in the 'Behesht Zahra' graveyard, where he is said to have been buried, no grave has been registered in his name.

According to Iranterror.com, "it was widely assumed that he was murdered in order to prevent the leak of sensitive information about MOIS operations, which would have compromised the entire leadership of the Islamic Republic."

There was an antagonism between the authorities and the victims' relatives. The lawyer for the victims relatives, Nasser Zarafshan, was arrested for "publicizing the case", for which her bail was set at the equivalent of $50,000 as opposed to $12,500 for some of the accused murderers. At least one of the victims' relatives, Sima Sahebi, the wife of Pouyandeh, was also arrested "for publishing a letter criticizing them for not allowing us to hold a memorial of the second anniversary of their death."

== Investigations ==
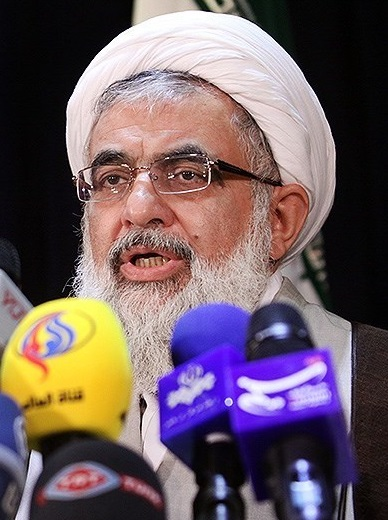
Ali Fallahian was intelligence minister at the start of the murders

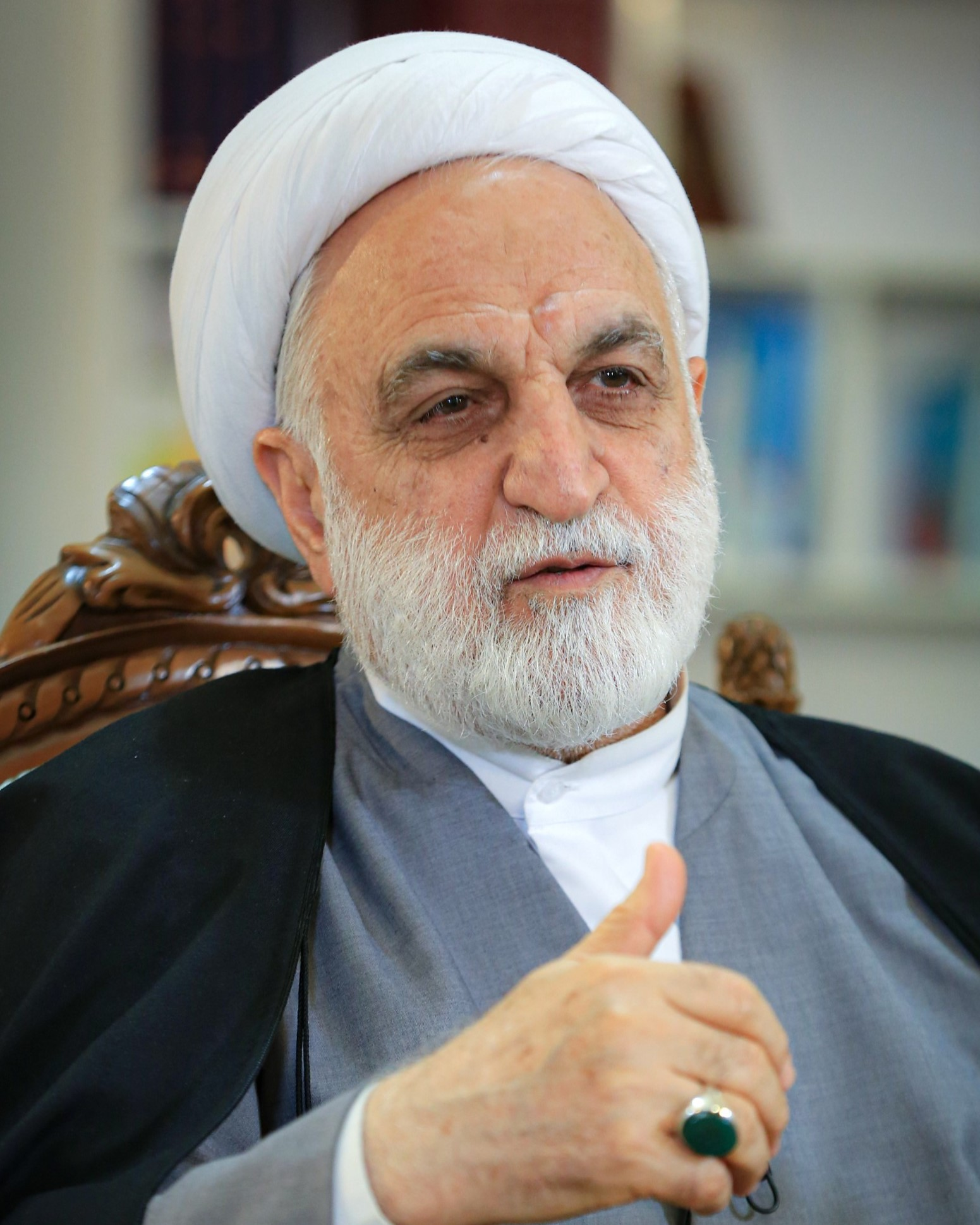
Gholam-Hossein Mohseni-Eje'i was intelligence minister during the murders

Investigative journalists Emadeddin Baghi and Akbar Ganji both wrote investigative news articles on the murders. In a series of articles in Saeed Hajjarian's Sobh Emrouz daily, Akbar Ganji referred to perpetrators with code names such as "Excellency Red Garmented" and their "Excellencies Gray" and the "Master Key".

In December 2000, Akbar Ganji announced the "Master Key" to the chain murders was former Intelligence Minister Hojjatoleslam Ali Fallahian. He "also denounced by name some senior clerics, including Ayatollah Mohammad Taqi Mesbah-Yazdi for having encouraged or issued fatwas, or religious orders for the assassinations." A number of government officials, including Mostafa Tajzadeh, the political deputy of the Ministry of State, emphatically rejected this view.

"Among the prominent Islamic Republic figures accused by human rights advocates of masterminding the chain murders were Mostafa Pour Mohammadi and Gholam-Hossein Mohseni-Eje'i, now serving as President Mahmoud Ahmadinejad's Interior and Intelligence ministers, respectively."

=== Retaliation against investigation ===
On 12 March 2000, Saeed Hajjarian was shot in the head by an assailant but narrowly escaped death, ending up paralyzed for life. He is "believed to have played a key role in bringing about… damaging disclosures" against the sponsors of the chain killings, not only as editor of Sobh Emrouz daily, but as a former deputy minister of intelligence turned reformist. Consequently, "some believe that remnants" of the chain murder "intelligence killer group may have been" behind his attempted assassination.

At about the same time, Akbar Ganji attended the Iran After the Elections conference in Berlin. Upon return he was arrested and sentenced to ten years' imprisonment, to be followed by five years in exile (later reduced to six years imprisonment and no exile) for "retaining classified documents from the Culture and Islamic Guidance Ministry, insulting the former Leader of the Islamic Republic of Iran, Ayatollah Khomeini, and disseminating propaganda against the Islamic system." His time in prison included hunger strikes and courtroom displays of torture marks. Baghi was sentenced to three years in prison in 2000 and served two years.

=== Explanation ===
The killings have been blamed on forces trying to put a stop to the Iranian reform movement and its effort to create "cultural and political openness." Shirin Ebadi speculates that the murders were done by a variety of means and surreptitiously to avoid any connection between them and to avoid the attention of the international community. Previous mass killings by the regime "had blackened the reputation" of the Islamic Republic and hindered Iran's efforts to provide jobs and resources for its growing population and "rebuild itself" after the Iran–Iraq War.

== In the media ==
The events surrounding one of the more infamous assassinations, the 1992 Mykonos restaurant assassinations and subsequent trial, were examined by Roya Hakakian in her book Assassins of the Turquoise Palace.

The event of the 21 writers in the bus and the murder of writers in 1998 formed the basis of Mohammad Rasoulof's 2013 film Manuscripts Don't Burn (Persian: دست‌نوشته‌ها نمی‌سوزند, translit. Dast-Neveshtehaa Nemisoozand).

== Notable victims ==
=== November–December 1998 ===
- Dariush Forouhar and his wife Parvaneh Eskandari Forouhar – a politically active couple that did not agree with Shiite theocracy; they were found assassinated by stabbing in their home. Parvaneh Eskandari Forouhar was stabbed 25 times.
- Mohammad Mokhtari – a writer that supported freedom of speech and freedom of the press, went missing and was found dead by suffocation, with suspicious bruising found on his neck.
- Mohammad Jafar Pouyandeh – a writer that supported freedom of speech and freedom of the press, went missing for three days and was found strangled to death.
- Majid Sharif – a writer that supported freedom of speech and freedom of the press, left his home for a jog and never returned. A day later the body was found, and the coroner reported it was death by cardiac arrest.

=== 1988–1998 ===
- Shapour Bakhtiar and secretary Soroush Katibeh – Bakhtiar was the former Prime Minister of Iran and leader of the National Resistance Movement of Iran. He was the last Prime Minister under Shah Mohammad Reza Pahlavi. Stabbed to death in 1991 by three Islamic republic agents along with Katibeh in France.
- Hussein Barazandeh – a 52-year-old engineer in Mashhad who was one of the close aides of Dr. Ali Shariati, disappeared after leaving for his home from a Quran recitation session. He was found dead the next day on 3 January 1995 far from his home. Initially, the reason for his death was said to be cardiac arrest, but later his family realized that the real reason was suffocation.
- Abdorrahman Boroumand – former Mohammad Mosaddegh supporter and member of the National Front of Iran. Stabbed to death in 1991 by Islamic Republic agents in France.
- Masoummeh Mossadegh, journalist and granddaughter of Mohammad Mossadegh. was found murdered in 1996.
- Pirouz Davani – an Iranian leftist activist, last seen in late August 1998 while leaving his residence in Tehran. His mother allegedly suffered a fatal heart attack upon hearing the news.
- Mehdi Dibaj – a Christian convert from Shi'ism who had been tried and convicted of apostasy, but then released in June 1994. He was abducted shortly thereafter and his body found on 5 July 1994.
- Hamid Hajizadeh – a teacher and poet from Kerman, along with his 9-year-old son, were found stabbed to death in their beds on the rooftop of their home on 22 September 1998.
- Ahmad Mir Alaei – a writer, translator and thinker, died in Isfahan under suspicious circumstances on 24 October 1995. He left home for an appointment at 7:45AM. Police called his family to report the discovery of a body at 11PM. Cardiac arrest was said to be the official reason for his death; a potassium injection is reportedly the actual reason.
- Kazem Sami – Iran's first Health Minister after the 1979 Islamic revolution, was stabbed to death November 1988 by an assailant posing as a patient at a clinic. No one was arrested.
- Abdul Rahman Ghassemlou and his assistant Abdullah Ghaderi Azar were murdered on 13 July 1989 in Vienna during negotiation with Iran's government.
- Sadegh Sharafkandi, Fattah Abdoli, Homayoun Ardalan, and Nouri Dehkordi – All four opposition leaders were assassinated in Germany during the Mykonos restaurant assassinations.
- Siamak Sanjari – killed on his wedding night in November 1996.
- Ali Akbar Saidi Sirjani – Iranian writer, poet and journalist who was imprisoned in 1994 and died shortly after while in prison from a potassium suppository.
- Ahmad Tafazzoli – a prominent Iranist and master of ancient Iranian literature and culture, found dead in January 1997.
- Ebrahim Zalzadeh – editor of the monthly magazine Me'yar and the director of the publishing house Ebtekar, aged 49, went missing after leaving his office for home. His corpse was found on 29 March 1997 stabbed to death.
- Fereydoun Farrokhzad - well known singer, actor, poet, TV and radio host, writer, humanitarian, and political opposition figure who was murdered in Bonn. His case remains unsolved.

== See also ==
- 1988 executions of Iranian political prisoners
- Assassination of Iranian nuclear scientists
- Death of Farshid Hakki
- Haghani Circle
- Hovyiat
- Human rights in the Islamic Republic of Iran
- Islamic Principlism in Iran
- List of fugitives from justice who disappeared
- Ruhollah Hosseinian
