= Mohammad-Ja'far Pouyandeh =

Iranian writer and activist (1954–1998)

Mohammad-Ja'far Pouyandeh محمدجعفر پوینده
- Born: 7 June 1954; Ashkezar, Yazd province, Iran
- Died: 8 or 9 December 1998 (aged 44); Shahriar County, Tehran, Iran
- Occupations: Writer, translator and activist
- Spouse: Sima Sahebi
- Children: 1

Mohammad Jafar Pouyandeh (also spelled Mohammad-Jafar Pooyandeh or Mohammad Jafar Poyandeh, Persian: محمدجعفر پوینده) (7 June 1954 – 8 or 9 December 1998) was an Iranian writer, translator and activist. He was a member of the Iranian Writers Association, a group who had been long banned in Iran due to their objection to censorship and encouraged freedom of expression. He was murdered during the Chain murders of Iran in 1998.

== Biography ==
Pouyandeh worked at the Cultural Research Institute and was working on translating a book called Questions & Answer about Human Rights at the time of his death. Pouyandeh was not a well known writer, translator, or activist in Iran and he is essentially known for his unusual circumstance of death.

Pouyandeh was last seen alive leaving his office at four o'clock in the afternoon of December 8, 1998 and still hadn't returned home three days later when his wife wrote and delivered a letter to Iran's president expressing her anguish over his disappearance. His body was discovered December 11. in the Shahriar district of Karaj, south of Tehran, and he appeared to have been strangled.

== See also ==
- Ahmad Tafazzoli
- Chain murders of Iran
- Lists of solved missing person cases
- List of unsolved murders (1980–1999)
- Mohammad Mokhtari
