= Dariush Forouhar =

Iranian politician (1928–1998)

- داریوش فروهر
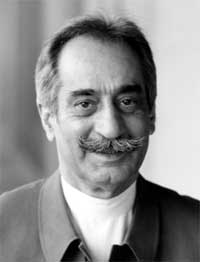

Minister of Labour
- In office 13 February 1979 – 29 September 1979
- Prime Minister: Mehdi Bazargan
- Preceded by: Manouchehr Aryana
- Succeeded by: Ali Espahbodi

Minister without Portfolio for Provincial Inspection
- In office 29 September 1979 – 6 November 1979
- Prime Minister: Mehdi Bazargan

Personal details
- Born: 18 August 1928 Esfahan, Iran
- Died: 22 November 1998 (aged 70) Tehran, Iran
- Cause of death: Assassination by stabbing
- Party: Nation Party of Iran (1951–98); Pan-Iranist Party (1951)
- Other political affiliations: National Front (1951–79)
- Spouse: Parvaneh Eskandari
- Children: 2, including Parastou
- Cabinet: Bazargan Cabinet

Dariush Forouhar (Persian: داریوش فروهر; 18 August 1928 – 22 November 1998) was an Iranian pan-Iranist politician, an early member of the Pan-Iranist Party, and leader of the Nation Party of Iran. In 1998, he and his wife, Parvaneh Forouhar, were stabbed to death in their home. They were among the victims of the chain murders of Iran.

== Early life ==
Forouhar was born in 1928 in Esfahan, 'Eshafah'. His father was a general in the Army who was arrested in WW2 by the British during the Anglo-Soviet invasion of Iran after attempting to form an armed resistance.

== Career and political activities ==
According to Ali Razmjoo in Hezb-e-Pan-Iranist, Forouhar was one of the founding members of the original nationalist Pan-Iranist Party of Iran in 1951 with Mohsen Pezeshkpour. During the Pahlavi era, he had been very active in the anti-Shah nationalist movement and was a strong supporter and close friend of the Prime Minister Mohammad Mosaddegh. In the midst of post-revolutionary tensions in Iranian Kurdistan in 1979, Forouhar was part of a delegation sent by Tehran to negotiate with Kurdish political and religious leaders. Although this delegation's recommendations were never implemented by the central government and the Kurdish revolt was dealt with harshly, Forouhar's attempts to reach a peaceful settlement with the Kurds earned him respect among the Kurds.

Forouhar served as the Minister of Labor in the interim government of Mehdi Bazargan in 1979.

== Death ==
Forouhar and his wife, Parvaneh, were overt opponents of Velayet-e-Faqih (clerical theocracy) and under continuous surveillance. On 21 November 1998, the couple were fatally stabbed at their home. The murders, which are believed to have been politically motivated, remain unsolved, although the general belief is that the Iranian Ministry of Intelligence was involved and had ordered the killings. It is thought that the murders were provoked by Forouhar's criticism of human rights abuses by the Islamic Republic in interviews with Western radio stations that beamed Persian-language programs to Iran. These criticisms brought Forouhar and his wife "to the attention of Iran's ubiquitous intelligence service".

Under pressure from public opinion, the then Iranian president Mohammad Khatami formed a committee to follow up the case, which eventually asked for the resignation of the Minister of Intelligence, Ghorbanali Dorri-Najafabadi. One of the main figures behind the case, Saeed Emami, reportedly committed suicide while in prison.

Shirin Ebadi, the lawyer of the Forouhars' relatives quoting Parastou says: "All evidence shows that my father was preparing himself to go to prison, because at the time of his slaying, his shoes had no laces, he did not wear his wrist watch and had his wallet emptied of its contents and papers except for some money".

Their murders brought to light a pattern known as the chain murders of Iran.

== Personal life ==
Forouhar had two children: a son, Arash, and a daughter, Parastou. Both children are politically active and continue to raise awareness of the plight of political dissidents in Iran. In 2009, Parastou signed an open letter of apology posted to Iranian.com along with 266 other Iranian academics, writers, artists, journalists about the persecution of Baháʼís.

Party political offices
Preceded by Hassan-Ali Saremi Kalali	Secretary-General of the Nation Party of Iran; 1953–1998	Succeeded by Khosrow Seif
Vacant Title last held by Mohammad Ali Keshavarz Sadr	Spokesperson of the National Front; 1978–1979	Succeeded by Asghar Parsa
