= Ali Babachahi =

Iranian poet and writer (1942–2026)

- علی باباچاهی
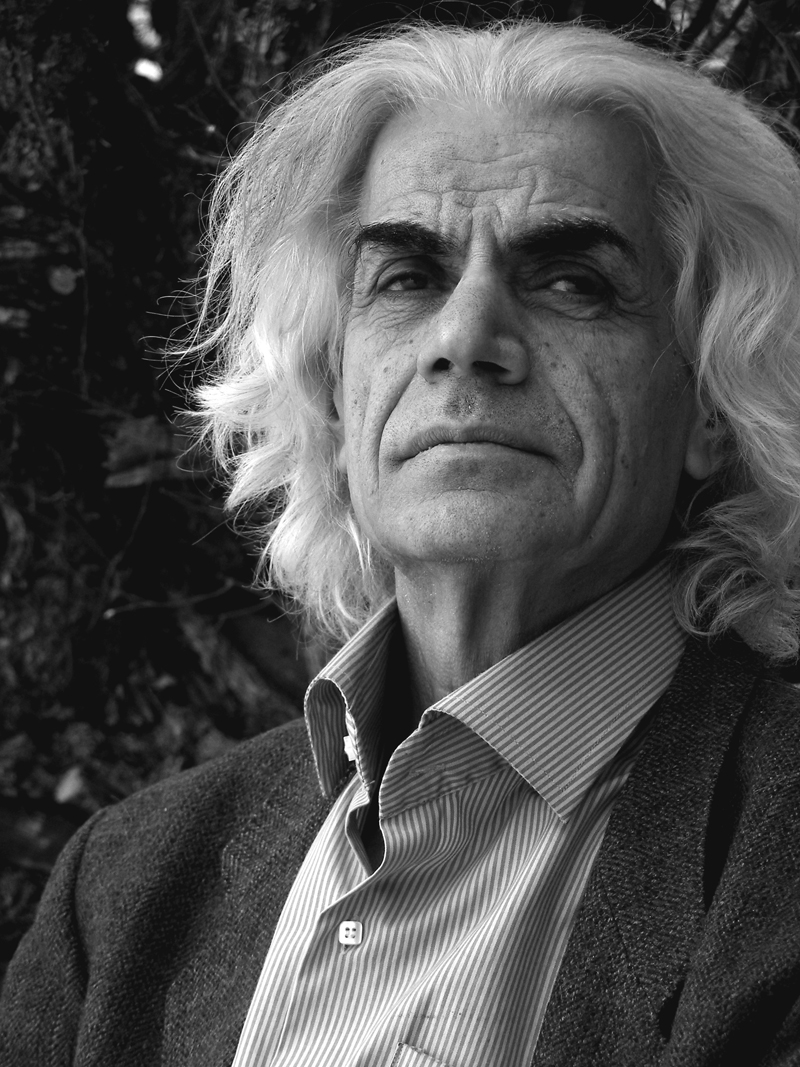
- Babachahi in 2011

Personal information
- Pen name: A. Faryad (in his youth)
- Born: 11 November 1942; Kangan, Bushehr province, Iran
- Died: 23 February 2026 (aged 83); Karaj, Iran
- Cause of death: Cardiac arrest
- Resting place: Behesht-e Sakineh, Karaj
- Nationality: Iranian
- Residence: Bushehr; Karaj
- Spouse: Farkhondeh Bakhtiari
- Children: Ghazal and Behrang

Education
- Educated at: Faculty of Letters, Shiraz University

Professional information
- Occupation: Poet, literary critic, researcher and writer
- Years active: 1961–2026 (1340–1404 SH)
- Organization: Writers' Association of Iran
- Awards: Ahmad Shamlou Poetry Prize (2016, shared)

Ali Babachahi (Persian: علی باباچاهی; 11 November 1942 – 23 February 2026; 20 Aban 1321 – 4 Esfand 1404 in the Solar Hijri calendar) was an Iranian poet, literary critic, researcher and writer. A recognised figure of modern Persian poetry in the generation after Nima, he became in the 1990s one of the most debated theorists and critics of contemporary Iranian poetry, introducing the notions of "post-Nimaic poetry" (she'r-e pasa-nimai) and, later, "poetry in another situation" (she'r dar vaz'iyat-e digar). He taught literature in Bushehr for about eighteen years and founded the literary magazine Tekapu there in 1967; the magazine was closed under pressure from SAVAK. In October 1977 he read his poems at the Ten Nights of Goethe in Tehran. After the revolution he was forcibly retired in 1983. For many years he edited the poetry pages of the monthly Adineh. He was a member of the Writers' Association of Iran and one of the passengers of the coach that was meant to be driven into a ravine during the 1996 Armenia bus incident. His collection In kashti-ye por-asrar ("This Mysterious Ship") was named in 2016 joint winner of the first Ahmad Shamlou Poetry Prize. He published more than thirty books of poetry, criticism and research.

== Biography ==
=== Childhood and youth ===
Ali Babachahi was born on 11 November 1942 in Kangan, in Bushehr province, and spent his childhood in the village of Jofreh. He was the youngest child of his family. By his own account, his first contact with poetry came through a pedlar who sold halva and books in the lanes of Jofreh, among them Mush-o gorbeh ("The Mouse and the Cat") by Obeid Zakani. Through his brothers he also came to know the political books of the Tudeh Party and magazines such as Omid-e Iran, Sepid-o siah and Roshanfekr.

He attended secondary school in Bushehr, where he was a pupil of Manouchehr Atashi and of Mohammad-Reza Nematizadeh; he later regarded the latter as decisive in shaping his poetic sensibility. According to his account, at the age of thirteen or fourteen he read Atashi a poem entitled "Baran" ("Rain"), and Atashi asked him to read it to the class; he saw this episode as "the beginning of the adventure that made him a poet". He won first place in the literary competition for secondary-school pupils in Bushehr and then in Shiraz, and by the end of secondary school his first poems were appearing under the pen name "A. Faryad" in the magazines Omid-e Iran and Zan-e ruz. After one of his poems was chosen by Omid-e Iran as the "best poem of the week", he began publishing under his own name.

=== University and teaching ===
In 1961, aged nineteen, Babachahi entered the Faculty of Letters of Shiraz University (some sources give 1960). There he met poets such as Alireza Tabaei and Mansour Ouji, and they read their poems to one another in a café on Zand Avenue in Shiraz. As a student Babachahi also wrote short stories, but he gave up fiction to devote himself to poetry and to the criticism of poetry after the Shiraz writer Mohammad Moazzen told him that he "was not a good prose writer". The publication of his poems in the weekly Ferdowsi in 1963 and 1964 settled his literary direction.

After his studies and military service, he was appointed a literature teacher in Bushehr in 1966 and taught for about eighteen years in the city's schools. He married in 1969, three years after taking up the post. His wife, Farkhondeh Bakhtiari, taught in Bushehr's secondary schools; the couple had a daughter, Ghazal, and a son, Behrang.

=== Tekapu and the pre-revolutionary years ===
Ali Babachahi reading
From the collection Jahan motavajjeh shod

Audio of Ali Babachahi reading from the collection Jahan motavajjeh shod

Broadcast by Radio Zamaneh on 23 February 2026.
Duration: 2 minutes and 14 seconds · Audio source: Radio Zamaneh
Last poetry collection
Jahan motavajjeh shod
("The World Realised (Poems of Protest)")

Cover of the collection Jahan motavajjeh shod (Poems of Protest) by Ali Babachahi

58 poems, according to the publisher
Aftab, Norway, 1401 SH (2022–23)

In autumn 1967 Babachahi became editor-in-chief of the literary magazine Tekapu ("Endeavour") in Bushehr. The magazine was well received in the intellectual circles of Tehran: Khusheh, the magazine edited by Ahmad Shamlou, reprinted texts from it and called its contributors "the craftsmen of today's Iranian poetry". Tekapu was nevertheless banned in 1968, after only three issues, under pressure from the security services and on the pretext that it lacked a licence.

His first collection, Dar bi-tekyegahi ("Without Support"), also appeared in 1967 at his own expense; it gathered poems in Nimaic metres. It was followed by Jahan va roshanayi-ha-ye ghamnak ("The World and the Melancholy Lights", 1970), Az nasl-e aftab ("Of the Lineage of the Sun", 1974) and Seda-ye shen ("The Voice of Sand", 1977); in the same period he also published two books of poetry for children. His poems appeared in the intellectual publications of the time, notably Khusheh and Ferdowsi, and he contributed to magazines such as Roshanfekr and Rudaki.

During these years Babachahi also wrote criticism of poetry. His first critical piece, published in Ferdowsi, was a reply to an article by Reza Baraheni; he then wrote fierce articles against the poetry of Yadollah Royaee. At the time he was a firm opponent of the "volume poetry" (she'r-e hajm) and "new wave" (mowj-e now) movements, and he later said of this period: "At that time I was somewhat ideological, or carried along by the spirit of the age"; his view of these movements, especially of volume poetry, changed in later decades. In September 2022, in an interview with the ISNA on the occasion of Royaee's death, he called him a "valuable" avant-garde poet who "had sufficient command of Iranian and French poetry", said he believed in his literary presence and "had always admired his poems", but described the volume-poetry manifesto as "very bombastic" and as "unscientific and poetic" in its expression. By his account, his political engagement, purely cultural before the revolution, took a "more concrete and more practical" form as the revolution approached.

=== The Ten Nights of Goethe (October 1977) ===
Ten Nights of Goethe poster
"Nights of Iranian Writers and Poets"
10–19 October 1977 (18–27 Mehr 1356 SH)

Red poster of the Nights of Iranian Writers and Poets with a blue fish and a green forest, designed by Bozorg Khezraei

Babachahi's name appears in the programme for Sunday 16 October (the seventh night).
Design: Bozorg Khezraei · Goethe-Institut, Tehran

==== Organisation and significance ====
From 10 to 19 October 1977 (18–27 Mehr 1356) the Writers' Association of Iran, in cooperation with the Goethe-Institut, held ten evenings of lectures and poetry readings under the title "Nights of Iranian Writers and Poets" in the garden of the Iran–Germany Cultural Society on Pahlavi Avenue (today's Valiasr Street) in Tehran; the series later became known as the "Ten Nights of Goethe". According to the Encyclopædia Iranica, poetry readings had been held at the institute in earlier years, but in 1977 the Iranian partner was for the first time not the government-sponsored Literary Society of Tehran but the oppositional Writers' Association, which had been allowed to meet again as part of the political liberalisation under Prime Minister Jamshid Amouzegar. The garden of the Cultural Society was chosen because the institute's own premises were considered too small for the expected audience. Members of the association agree that the idea came from the poet Jalal Sarfaraz, who edited the poetry page of the daily Kayhan; the logistics were entrusted to Eslam Kazemiyeh. Sarfaraz later wrote that his model had been the poetry nights of the magazine Khousheh organised under Ahmad Shamlou, and that the garden was rented, on the suggestion of the institute's director Hans Becker, for 4,000 tomans a night.

According to the Iranica, on the first night the crowd was so large that it spilled into the neighbouring streets, where loudspeakers were set up; up to ten thousand people attended the first nights, and after the rain began the number fell to about three thousand. More than fifty writers, poets, playwrights, critics and translators spoke of censorship, freedom of thought, the responsibilities of intellectuals, inequality and oppression, "thus turning a literary event into a political one". The Azadi website estimates the audience at between ten and fifteen thousand, and an article by "M. Kh." in the online magazine Iranchehr counts 57 speakers and poets.

The association and the institute had agreed that speakers would use the word momayyezi ("inspection"), the term used in the constitution, instead of "censorship"; on the third night, however, Shams Al-e Ahmad revealed the agreement at the very start of his talk and repeatedly used the word "censorship". On the fifth night, after a lecture by Bagher Momeni, who according to the Azadi website used the word "censorship" more than a hundred times, and a reading by Saeed Soltanpour, the excitement of the crowd peaked and Becker shouted for the poet to leave the stage. It was then decided to drop the lectures, but the new arrangement met with protests from the audience and, after renewed negotiations between the association and the institute, the lectures resumed from the sixth night. At the end of the ninth night a telegram of solidarity from a group of French writers and thinkers, among them Jean-Paul Sartre, Simone de Beauvoir and Michel Foucault, was read out. On the last night the association's chairman, Behazin, told the crowd: "For ten nights you came, in crowds that often reached ten thousand or more [...] and listened to the speakers. What did you hear? Freedom, and freedom, and freedom..."; the association's closing message was read by Houshang Golshiri. The Iranica notes that although armoured personnel carriers surrounded the area, no violence occurred, and that the Ten Nights became "the first in a series of mass protest meetings that culminated in the Revolution of 1979".

The poster was designed by Bozorg Khezraei, a graphic artist at the daily Ettela'at: a small white fish which, in the designer's words, raises "the cry of struggle against censorship and repression". According to Sarfaraz, the censors did not allow the association's name to appear on the poster, which was censored twice; he also wrote that newspapers, radio and television had been ordered not to publish any news or report, and that only Cyrus Alinejad published a report in Ayandegan after the first night, which got him into trouble. The Iranchehr account, based on the newspapers of the time, differs somewhat: according to it, four national dailies printed the poster and the programme on 4 October 1977, and Ettela'at, Kayhan and Rastakhiz briefly covered the evenings until the sixth night, after which all but Ettela'at fell silent.

Tapes of the Ten Nights were copied and sold in thousands in Iran and abroad, and the texts of the lectures and poems were published in 1978 by Amir Kabir as Dah shab ("Ten Nights"), edited by Naser Mo'azzen. According to Sarfaraz, the master tapes of the lectures and readings, as well as the tapes of the question-and-answer sessions, were later lost through negligence; copies nevertheless survived, and in 2022–2023 the Azadi website published audio files of the readings and lectures together with the poster and a digital copy of the book.

==== Babachahi's reading on the seventh night ====
Ali Babachahi reading
Ten Nights of Goethe – seventh night
Sunday 16 October 1977 (24 Mehr 1356)
Garden of the Iran–Germany Cultural Society, Tehran
His poems in the book Dah shab (pp. 447–456):
1. "Hail to the red blossom that sprang from the cup of the East"
2. "Native song"
3. "In praise of the world's lovers"
4. "In the realm of ashes"
Duration: 3:35 · Audio source: Azadi (azadi.art)

Babachahi, who was then living in Bushehr, was announced as a participant before the organisers had been able to contact him. On 4 October 1977 Kayhan reported: "Although the names of Mansour Owji, Ali Babachahi, Bahman Salehi and Mansour Barmaki appear in the list of participants, the organisers have not been able to reach them because they live in the provinces." According to "M. Kh.", the association, which had no addresses for some of these poets, published their names so that they would hear of it and come; on 10 October Kayhan reported that they had been informed and had declared themselves ready to take part. Of the four, Salehi and Barmaki did not attend.

The poster listed Babachahi, together with Eslam Kazemiyeh, M. Azad, Javad Mojabi, Jalal Sarfaraz and Batoul Azizpour, for the programme of Sunday 16 October 1977 (24 Mehr 1356), the seventh night. According to the audio files published by the Azadi website, the seventh night opened with a lecture by Kazemiyeh on "Freedom in the Constitution and the holding of the poets' nights"; Dariush Ashoori then spoke on "Poetry is freedom", the admission of Abbas Jalali Susanabadi to the association was announced, and Jafar Kushabadi, Ali Babachahi, Javad Mojabi and M. Azad read their poems. The same evening a message from the translator Mohammad Ghazi, who could not speak after throat surgery, was read by his daughter Maryam. The sources differ on the line-up of the evening: the book Dah shab also lists Batoul Azizpour and Jalal Sarfaraz among the poets of the seventh night, whereas in the Azadi audio files Sarfaraz's reading and Azizpour's poems (read by Sarfaraz) belong to the eighth night.

Babachahi's poems are printed in the seventh-night section of Dah shab (pp. 447–456): "Salam bar shekufe-ye sorkhi ke az piyale-ye mashreq damid" ("Hail to the red blossom that sprang from the cup of the East"), "Sorud-e bumi" ("Native song"), "Dar vasf-e asheqan-e donya" ("In praise of the world's lovers") and "Dar qalamrow-e khakestar" ("In the realm of ashes"). The first poem opens with the lines "Hail to the sun and to love / O restless soul of the port / O utmost of glory and madness". An audio recording of his reading that evening, 3 minutes 35 seconds long, is available on the Azadi website.

=== After the revolution ===
In 1980 Babachahi published the collection Jashn-e jonun ("The Feast of Madness"). In 1983, after eighteen years of teaching, he was compulsorily and prematurely retired; he later said that he had "very probably" been "pushed aside" by those who regarded themselves as the "true owners of the revolution". He then left Bushehr and settled in Karaj. According to Ali Masoudinia, once barred from teaching he devoted himself for years to critical research on Iranian poetry.

In Karaj, through the playwright Khosrow Hakim-Rabet, he worked with the radio as a writer of radio plays. From 1989, under the direction of Nasrollah Pourjavady, he worked for the University Publication Centre (Markaz-e nashr-e daneshgahi), where for eleven or twelve years he was engaged in book editing and in research on classical Persian texts, until the Centre's Persian dictionary department was closed. He is also credited with working for publishers such as Papirus and Pishbord and with being responsible for the poetry and criticism section of the magazine Nafeh.

From 1988 Babachahi published articles on the currents of contemporary poetry in the monthly Adineh; from issue 35 he took charge of its poetry pages, which he edited for about ten years; according to him, Eshkevari had held the post before him. In issue 36 he published work by Ahmad Shamlou, Farrokh Tamimi, Seyyed Ali Salehi, Ali Mohammad Haghshenas and Hormoz Alipour. The strictness of his choices led some rejected poets to chant against him the humorous slogan "Dictator, hurry up / print our poems!" According to KhabarOnline, from this post he introduced young poets while openly criticising the dominant poetic currents; it was in this period that he formulated "post-Nimaic poetry" and then "poetry in another situation". Masoudinia regards Adineh as one of the most influential publications of the 1990s in several fields, poetry among them.

=== Writers' Association of Iran ===
After his retirement Babachahi was a regular at the Wednesday gatherings at the home of Mohammad-Ali Sepanlou, through which he joined the consultative circle of the Writers' Association. He was one of the signatories of the "Statement of the 134 Writers" (the text "We Are Writers", 1994) and, as a member of the consultative circle, then worked for the revival of the Writers' Association of Iran. After the Association's third period was constituted in February–March 1999 he became a formal member, and he remained one until the end of his life; his last attendance at the Association's general assembly was in 2023.

=== Armenia bus incident ===
In August 1996 Babachahi was one of twenty-one writers, poets and journalists who set out by coach for Armenia at the invitation of the Writers' Union of Armenia. According to Radio Farda, Mansour Koushan, who was in charge of coordinating the trip with the writers, had drawn up a list of literary figures; of these, Ahmad Shamlou, Houshang Golshiri and Reza Baraheni each withdrew for various reasons, and the following twenty-one people finally made the journey: Mohammad-Ali Sepanlou, Javad Mojabi, Masoud Behnoud, Sirous Alinejad, Amir Hassan Cheheltan, Bijan Bijari, Bijan Najdi, Mohammad Mohammad-Ali, Shahriar Mandanipour, Shapour Jorkesh, Masoud Toufan, Ali Babachahi, Hassan Asghari, Manouchehr Karimzadeh, Kamran Jalili, Mahmoud Tayyari, Faraj Sarkohi, Fereshteh Sari, Majid Danesh-Arasteh, Ali Seddighi and Mansour Koushan. At dawn on 6 August 1996 the driver twice tried to send the coach over the edge of the ravine at the Heyran Pass, jumping from the vehicle himself each time; the vigilance of Masoud Toufan and Shahriar Mandanipour saved the passengers. They were then detained and questioned in Astara and released the following morning. According to BBC Persian, the most detailed account of the affair is the one given by Mansour Koushan in his book Hadis-e teshneh va ab, and Mohammad Mohammad-Ali published the first text on the subject in Iran in the early 2000s. The event was later recognised as a plot by the Ministry of Intelligence to eliminate critical writers and has been linked to the chain murders. Babachahi always referred to it as a "horrifying experience".

=== Last years and death ===
In an interview given on his seventy-seventh birthday (November 2019), Babachahi said that he had published his latest book, the collection Joseph, to morakhkhasi ("Joseph, You May Go", Mania Honar, 2018), with the subtitle "The action of the social element" and a 33-page preface, in order to answer critics who considered his poetry unsocial. He added that he had no book in preparation, that he spent most of his time reading philosophy and novels, and that he was active on social media to stay in touch with the younger generation, where, as in the days when he edited the pages of Adineh, he published the poems of other writers. He said he had also run a poetry workshop for years; according to Masoudinia, the workshop had existed since the 2000s and several of its participants became recognised poets. In the same article IBNA described him as one of the first poets of the "Bushehr school of poetry".

Babachahi's last collection, Jahan motavajjeh shod (she'r-ha-ye e'teraz) ("The World Realised (Poems of Protest)"), appeared according to its title page in 1401 of the Solar Hijri calendar (2022–2023), as a first edition, from Aftab in Norway; according to the publisher it contains 58 poems. The publisher presents the texts as "the fruit of a hundred days of struggle in the street" and "the poet and the word marching together with the people's protest". Radio Zamaneh describes it as a 136-page collection with a short preface and 54 poems and dates its publication to spring 2023. Hossein Noushazar, writing for the same outlet, says that the collection was published in 2023 "under the influence of the Woman, Life, Freedom movement" and that it "opened a new window onto Iranian protest poetry". The Writers' Association of Iran sees in it Babachahi's poetic narrative of the 2022 protest movement. In the preface Babachahi writes that protest and civil disobedience are the people's recourse against poverty and repression, and that "this does not mean that intellectuals may evade these misfortunes"; he criticises the "well-fed poets" who "lay claim to freedom and justice behind metaphor and symbol", and also frames his approach as a challenge to the "established rules" of poetry. In April 2023 the literary magazine Bang published three poems from the collection chosen by the poet himself, including "Ey…!" in a reading by the author. According to Noushazar, "Ey…!" was written in 2020 in response to the November 2019 protests and first published in 2023. In the same article, Radio Zamaneh identified it as one of the poems in the collection and said that a recording of Babachahi reading it had been broadcast in its radio programme on Monday 23 February 2026 (4 Esfand 1404 SH), alongside the news of his death.

ISNA video on Ali Babachahi
"For Ali Babachahi: a different voice in contemporary Iranian poetry"
Monday 23 February 2026, the day of the poet's death

▶ Click to watch
Note: the narrator mistakenly gives the date of death as "4 Bahman" (23 January); the correct date is 4 Esfand 1404 SH (23 February 2026).
Video: ISNA (in Persian) · Photo: Wikimedia Commons

After a period of illness, Ali Babachahi died of cardiac arrest on the afternoon of Monday 23 February 2026 in a hospital in Karaj, at the age of 83. He was buried on the morning of Thursday 26 February 2026 at Behesht-e Sakineh cemetery in Karaj, in the presence of his family and of literary figures including Hormoz Alipour, Mohammad Ghassemzadeh, Shahab Mogharrabin, Hafez Mousavi and Mozaffar Royaee, to the sound of the dammam, a drum of southern Iran. In a statement, the Writers' Association of Iran paid tribute to him as "an independent writer and a sincere defender of freedom of thought and expression".

== Poetry and poetics ==
Over the decades Babachahi's style moved from social romanticism and Nimaic poetry towards post-Nimaic poetry. Behzad Khajat divides his work into two periods, before and after the 1990s, and counts him among the forerunners of a current that overturned the customary conception of poetry during that decade. The Writers' Association of Iran describes him as an "experimental poet" who revised his style twice in seven decades of literary activity. At his funeral Hafez Mousavi said that Babachahi, "at the very moment when he was at the height of his fame and standing", had shown an entirely different face with the publication of Nam-nam-e baranam ("I Am the Drizzle") in the 1990s.

In the article "The Boundless Expanse of Meaning", published in the magazine Rudaki (no. 22, 2008), Babachahi argues that the literary text, and contemporary poetry in particular, has no fixed, predetermined meaning, and that meaning is constructed in a dynamic process between text and reader. In his view, ambiguity, suspension and linguistic ruptures are not weaknesses but resources that widen the field of interpretation. In the article "The Crisis of Poetry and the Ways Out of It" (monthly Farhang-e towse'eh, May–June 2001) he writes: "The crisis, in its general sense, probably points to something outside poetry. It would therefore be unfair to attribute the crisis to contemporary poetry."

He set out the foundations of post-Nimaic poetry in the article "Axes and Characteristics of Post-Nimaic Poetry" (magazine Karnameh, March–May 1999). KhabarOnline summarises the principles of the theory of "poetry in another situation" as the "linguisticity of poetry" (language as the object of poetry rather than its instrument), the "deferral of meaning", the "escape from syntax", and "humour and parody". In the ISNA interview cited above, Babachahi distinguishes "poetry in another situation" from the "other poetry" (she'r-e digar) of the 1960s, a current to which, in his view, poets such as Bijan Elahi and Houshang Chalangi belong, and to which Royaee's poetry is close. According to him, "other poetry" respects its organic unity and is "structured and centripetal", whereas "poetry in another situation" "belongs to the age of suspicion": it is centrifugal, made of "multiple narratives" attentive to "the different inner selves of the human being", with open endings. He calls Royaee's poetry "structuralist" and "poetry in another situation" "post-structuralist", "fragmented in appearance, with multiple narratives" and "reader-oriented". In an interview with the Mehr News Agency (2006) he described the interest of today's poets in "psychological deep structure" as "a kind of mysticism", and in an interview with Radio Zamaneh (2008) he described the presence of women in his poetry as "the desire for a certain freshness, a kind of vitality". He was convinced that poetry continues on its way even after the poet is gone. He also said that he owed his poems "to the anxieties" which, in his words, "violently besiege" him, adding that amid all this "humour comes to my rescue". According to Hossein Noushazar, Babachahi distinguished "protest poetry" from mere "slogan" or "shouting" and insisted on its artistic dimension: in his view, protest poetry should not copy bitter social realities but transform them into "artistic reality" through imagination, thought and the devices of language. He saw the grotesque humour and verbal virtuosity of his poetry as the product of confronting catastrophe, insisted that the poet must detach himself from old idealisms and from the discourses of power through a deconstructive approach, and regarded both official censorship and self-censorship as two scourges of creative work.

== Literary criticism and controversies ==
As a critic Babachahi had a sharp pen. His book Gozare-ha-ye monfared ("Isolated Propositions"), which ranks poets and bluntly criticises certain currents, provoked many reactions. His best-known theoretical controversy was with Reza Baraheni and is remembered as the "Tehran–Toronto battle". He also criticised the current of "simplicity" in poetry (sadeh-nevisi), notably the views of Mohammad Shams Langeroodi and Seyyed Ali Salehi. According to Ali Masoudinia, Babachahi, especially in the 1990s and 2000s, was constantly in dispute with other critics and poets, at times to the point of "verbal violence"; Masoudinia regards his clashes with Reza Baraheni and Manouchehr Atashi as "precious memories" of a time when poetry was still a matter of debate and controversy, and recalls that Babachahi later said: "I no longer answer anyone below Baraheni!" On Shapour Jorkesh's polemic against Babachahi's theories and Reza Baraheni's reply to Jorkesh, see below.

== Critical reception ==
In his Analytical History of New Poetry, Mohammad Shams Langeroodi describes Babachahi's first collection, Dar bi-tekyegahi, as emotional and image-laden poetry, socially oriented and charged with a self-destructive sadness, which, although sentimental and "youthful", appealed both to political circles and to the advocates of "art for art's sake", and became famous. In his view, in the second collection, Jahan va roshanayi-ha-ye ghamnak, Babachahi continued along the same path in an oratorical, image-laden tone, under the influence of Forugh Farrokhzad, and the third, Az nasl-e aftab, shows little qualitative change except in metre, where, according to Langeroodi, it extends the achievements of Farrokhzad and M. Azad and marks a step from Nimaic metres towards free verse. Khosrow Golsorkhi also wrote a review of Jahan va roshanayi-ha-ye ghamnak.

According to Esfandiar Koucheh, writing for Radio Zamaneh, Manouchehr Atashi had named Babachahi and two other poets in the magazine Donya-ye sokhan as the standard-bearers of the avant-garde poetry of the 1990s. In his review of Jahan motavajjeh shod, Koucheh sees the preface as "something like a manifesto" defining protest poetry and notes that the poet, following Edward Said, holds that poets and writers have a duty not to remain indifferent to the events around them, street protests included. In his view, in this collection, "with the blaze of the Iranian people's revolution", Babachahi's language games become rarer, the images become "more naked", and the poems dated 2022 seem "more dynamic and more gripping". Koucheh notes the historical and literary references in these poems: to a line by Ahmad Shamlou ("Look at the blood on the pavement"), to the events of the Constitutional Revolution and to Howard Baskerville, to Hasanak the Vizier and the Tarikh-e Beyhaqi, and to the slogans and patrols of the revolutionary committees of the 1980s. At the same time, he counts among the collection's weaknesses the inclusion of three poems with almost identical narratives and vocabulary ("Protest 3", "Protest 8" and "Protest (short story)"). In his reading of the poem "Ey…!", Noushazar writes that the poet plays with pronouns "in the manner of Derrida" to reveal the latent violence of power, and that the line "Mahboubeh was my other name" gives the narrator a female identity and, in his view, brings the poem close to the Woman, Life, Freedom movement a year before it erupted.

In a note published on KhabarOnline on the day of Babachahi's death, Ali Masoudinia identifies as the "essential point" of his work his "constant tendency" to create poetry that is "propositional and against the current". In his account, Babachahi began with Nimaic poetry in Bushehr in the 1960s while also establishing himself as a serious critic, and set himself apart from his contemporaries in the late 1970s and early 1980s through a new approach to compound metres and Nimaic prosody. The peak of his poetic and critical project, however, came in the 1990s, when he turned first to free verse and then, exploring literary theory and postmodern ideas, found in Nam-nam-e baranam and Manzel-ha-ye darya bi-neshan ast ("The Stations of the Sea Leave No Trace") a linguistic texture and formal identity of his own, and sought to explain his poetics through "poetry in another situation" and "post-Nimaic poetry". Masoudinia lists as features of this poetry the deconstructive collapse of thematic supports, syntactic rupture and shifts of register, the fluidity of a mind built on association, a collage-like quality, an abundance of blank spaces to be read, and "a bold, black humour", and adds that Babachahi later experimented with the short poem, the haiku and simpler, more narrative forms. He sees the taste for experiment as a trait "unusual among the poets of his generation", judges Babachahi's critical method "extremely eclectic and unconventional" but productive of "valuable critical texts", and cites Gozare-ha-ye monfared, She'r-e emruz, zan-e emruz ("Today's Poetry, Today's Woman") and Se daheh sha'eran-e herfe'i ("Three Decades of Professional Poets") as books that made a "not insignificant" contribution to the analysis of contemporary Iranian poetry. For Masoudinia, who had earlier devoted a piece to him entitled "The Lonely, Scowling Gladiator", Babachahi's poetry was "poorly served", and he himself, despite his position as an influential figure and theorist of Iranian literature, "was not appreciated at his true worth"; he attributes this partly to the fact that Babachahi defended his poetry "stubbornly" and "with his whole being".

According to Iran Emrooz, critical writing on his work has emphasised that some of his poems rest on formalist experiment and play with the structures of language, while others reflect his social criticism, his humour and his political concerns.

In an interview with IBNA after his death, Behzad Khajat called Babachahi a "universal" figure and argued that, although perhaps no one equals Shamlou in the breadth of his activity, Babachahi is "a choice worthy of attention, who can stand beside a great figure like Shamlou or, on another horizon, beside Reza Baraheni". According to Khajat, Babachahi's theories "made explicit and academic" the pluralist climate after the 1990s and the turn of poetry towards the "centrality of language", with his poetry always serving as the basis of his theories. Unlike many of his contemporaries who were anxious to preserve their "traditional prestige", he took the risk of "experimental poetry" and, especially while editing the poetry pages of Adineh, formed a deep bond with the new generation by bringing young poets to light. Khajat sees the humour of "poetry in another situation" as a means of challenging the "grand sacred narratives": thus, in his view, the beloved, a sacred and inaccessible object in traditional poetry, becomes in Babachahi's work an ordinary, everyday character.

=== Simin Behbahani and Abdolali Dastgheib ===
Simin Behbahani devoted an article to his poems entitled "A Look at Some Poems by Babachahi", published in issue 23 of the bimonthly literary magazine Chameh (April–June 2022).

Abdolali Dastgheib wrote about Babachahi's poetry on several occasions, notably in the article "Postmodernism in Babachahi's Poems", published in Jahan-e Ketab (vol. 15, nos. 3–4, serial no. 254, May–July 2010), and in the article "The Novelties of Babachahi's Poetry Are More of This Place", published in Chameh (2022). According to Jam-e Jam Online's report on a session devoted to Babachahi's work at the National Association of Literary Critics, held a few days after his death, Dastgheib read poems from Faghat az pariyan-e daryayi zakhm-e zaban nemi-khorad ("Only the Mermaids Spare Him Their Barbs") and Picasso dar ab-ha-ye Khalij-e Fars ("Picasso in the Waters of the Persian Gulf"). He said that critics are more interested in the "rank and affiliation" of poets than in knowing them and their poetry, whereas the quality of a poem lies in the reader's ability to enter its world; a world which, in Babachahi's case, is in his view "sometimes comic, sometimes grave, sometimes lyrical". According to Dastgheib, Babachahi's poetry remained in the spirit of Nimaic poetry until the end of the 1990s; thereafter the vocabulary, the relations governing the world of the poem, "the way of arranging words" and the manner of entering the poem were transformed. Among the features of this poetry he noted the scattering of sentences (behind which, in his view, the main meaning passes), local allusions, references to proverbs, nursery rhymes and folk tales, familiarity with classical literature, the grotesque and humour, and he cited the line "The nothing of nothing is better than nothing" as an instance of the poet's play with language. Dastgheib judged the poetic dimension of Faghat az pariyan-e daryayi... to be stronger and the theoretical dimension of Picasso... more pronounced, and stressed that Babachahi's poetry "is in no way an escape from meaning": the pains and torments of contemporary man are hidden behind its new form. He concluded that what Babachahi says in his poetry "is neither an imitation of, nor an influence from, other postmodern books" and that he had "understood postmodernity well… and puts it to good use in his poetry".

=== Faraj Sarkohi ===
In October 2011 Faraj Sarkohi, himself a passenger on the Armenia bus, examined Babachahi's work in two periods in BBC Persian's "Seven Days, Books" column, devoted on that occasion to Gol-baran-e hezar-ruzeh ("A Thousand-Day Shower of Flowers"). According to him, Babachahi established himself in the 1960s and 1970s, with the famous poem "I Come from the Watering Place of the Ugly-Voiced Frogs" and the other poems of Dar bi-tekyegahi, as one of the leading figures of the poetry of the time. The Nimaic poems of this period adopted the dominant devices of Nimaic poetry and, through "criticism and negation of the existing order", rejected the dominant social, political and cultural frameworks; the poems of Jahan va roshanayi-ha-ye ghamnak, Az nasl-e aftab, Seda-ye shen and some of those in Ava-ye darya-mardan ("The Song of the Sea-Men") belong to the same framework. The second period, according to Sarkohi, is bound up with the upheavals of the 1990s, which he calls "the decade of the crisis of Persian poetry" and which saw the emergence of waves such as post-Nimaic poetry, "poetry in another situation", deconstructive poetry and postmodernist poetry. Sarkohi writes that Babachahi was one of the pioneers in transforming the structure, form and language of Nimaic poetry and one of the influential poets of that decade, and that he sought to set out the theoretical foundations of his proposals in his non-poetic writings, notably Gozare-ha-ye monfared. In his view, at a time when "theoretical poverty" reduced the criticism of those years to the adoption of notions spread through the translation of one or two works by postmodern thinkers, Babachahi's poetry "went beyond reproducing these developments". Through its inclination towards polyphony, compound metres, relativism and the rejection of absolutes and grand narratives; through new experiments in form, language and tone; and through deconstruction and defamiliarisation, the grotesque and "the building of the poem on contradiction and paradox", it sought to create new but still poetic perspectives. Because his poetry rested on a knowledge of classical culture and poetry, of Nimaic and Shamlou-style poetry and on his own "experience and talent", it stayed clear of what were called the "language games and structural games" of the decade. Sarkohi sees the poems of Gol-baran-e hezar-ruzeh as a continuation of this path and considers that the work of this period consolidates Babachahi's place "as one of the few accomplished poets of this wave or current".

=== Fellow passengers of the Armenia bus ===
Several other passengers of the Armenia bus were colleagues, fellow members of literary circles or critics of Babachahi. According to the Writers' Association of Iran, he was a regular at the Wednesday gatherings at Mohammad-Ali Sepanlou's home, through which he joined the Association's consultative circle. Babachahi himself recalled taking part before the revolution in the "Poetry Tuesdays" gatherings together with Mohammad Mokhtari, Javad Mojabi, Faramarz Soleimani, Aziz Khalili, Esmail Raha, Mohammad Mohammad-Ali and a few others, and complained that Mojabi, when recounting his memories of that period in a book, had left out his name; he said he did not know why. In Ayineh-ye bamdad, a collection of his writings and interviews about Ahmad Shamlou, Mojabi reproduced a conversation about Shamlou with poets including Manouchehr Atashi, Mohammad Hoqouqi, Mohammad-Ali Sepanlou and Babachahi; he also attended, at Shamlou's house, the first award ceremony of the Ahmad Shamlou Poetry Prize, at which Babachahi's In kashti-ye por-asrar was one of the two winners. In a piece published in Independent Persian after Mojabi's death (2026), Dariush Me'mar compares Mojabi's poetic career with Babachahi's: in his view, poets such as Reza Baraheni and Babachahi "engaged, in certain periods of their poetic lives, in fundamental experiments with language, syntax and form", sometimes opening up a considerable gap between their different periods, whereas Mojabi remained essentially within the Nimaic tradition and Shamlou's free verse.

From 1997 the novelist Mohammad Mohammad-Ali co-edited with Babachahi three special issues of Adineh devoted to poetry and the short story, and Babachahi described their collaboration at Adineh as "a very good period". Mohammad-Ali and Masoud Behnoud are among those who speak about Babachahi's poetic and personal sides in the documentary In ghiyafeh-ye mashkuk. The literary magazine Bang, of which Shahriar Mandanipour is one of the editors, published three poems from Babachahi's protest collection in April 2023.

The critic Shapour Jorkesh, another passenger on the bus, was one of the firmest opponents of Babachahi's theories. In an interview with Mahyar Zahed published under the title "Looking to the Future" in the daily Etemad (no. 1545, 21 November 2007), he called Babachahi a "journalist and contemporary poet" and claimed that on page 771 of Gozare-ha-ye monfared Babachahi attributed to his book Hush-e sabz five lines that do not appear in it. Jorkesh said: "Mr Babachahi, who acknowledges that he owes his possible literary populism to the 1990s, can by this kind of sleight of hand deny any possible influence of Shamlou on him", adding: "perhaps I have the right to regard such a casual and imprecise theory as one of the causes of the impasse of the poetry of the 1990s". According to Etemad, the interview "had wide repercussions", and Reza Baraheni defended Babachahi in a long reply entitled "To Tomorrow's Ageless Generation" (Etemad, no. 1567, 17 December 2007): "Everyone knows that Mr Babachahi is a poet and literary critic. This is the first time anyone has called him a 'journalist'." For Baraheni, by putting the word "journalist" before "poet", Jorkesh had sought to "belittle" Babachahi and owed an apology both to journalists and to Babachahi, since "everything he has written and published so far belongs to poetry and the criticism of poetry".

=== Academic studies ===
Babachahi's poetry has been the subject of a substantial body of academic work. As of October 2026 the Elmnet database lists more than 70 scholarly documents under the keyword "Ali Babachahi" (journal articles, conference papers, master's and doctoral theses, and books), some of them written by Babachahi himself. At least eight master's and doctoral theses, defended between 2010 and 2016 at universities including Arak, Zabol, Ferdowsi University of Mashhad, Vali-e-Asr University of Rafsanjan and Payame Noor University, examine various aspects of his poetry: foregrounding, the image of the beloved, binary oppositions, regional elements and localism, humour and the grotesque, and postmodernist components.

In an article in Zibayi-shenasi-ye adabi (2012), Mohammad-Jalil Bahadori and Hassan Zolfaghari count indifference to chronological sequence among the features of the poetry of the 2000s and of Babachahi's poetry: according to them, the poet interweaves different periods, creates a non-linear text and knowingly takes liberties with historical facts, a trait they connect with the ideas of the post-structuralists and of Jacques Derrida. Ebrahim Mohebbi and his co-authors (2019), taking a cognitive-stylistic approach, identify "structural distortion" and the breaking of the "container and place" schema as stylistic features of his poetry which, in their view, result in a "rhizomatic schema"; they consider traditional stylistics incapable of analysing such poems. Mohammad-Amin Ehsani Estahbanati and Mohammad-Reza Sarfi (2021) call Babachahi "one of the most advanced representatives of postmodernism in Iran" and examine in his poetry components such as the escape from syntax, the disordered structure of language, the rejection of reason and the absence of cohesion and certainty. Behzad Khajat (2021), comparing one of his poems with a poem by Mohammad Shams Langeroodi in the light of Gilles Deleuze's rhizomatic theory, presents Babachahi as the representative of postmodernist poetry and Shams Langeroodi as that of the so-called "simplicity" current.

Ali Mohammadi and Tahereh Ghassemi (2022), studying the titles of his poems, trace his development from beginnings marked by Nima and realism to his entry into postmodern poetry with Nam-nam-e baranam and Aghl azabam mi-dahad ("Reason Torments Me"). Ronak Joharzadeh and her co-authors (2022) note the frequency in these same two collections of components such as uncertainty, "reading the blanks", the "death of the author" and paradox, and examine the strengths and weaknesses of this kind of poetry at the linguistic, thematic and literary levels. According to the study by Zakieh Mohammadlou and her co-authors (2022), simile is the most common form of semantic deviation in Babachahi's poetry, while metaphor is used less. Mahboubeh Shirgardoun (2022), studying seven of his collections, finds his poetry to be based mainly on description and simile, with wide use of natural elements, and identifies repetition as the most frequently used figure. Other studies analyse the poem "Pasingahi 2" from the standpoint of geocriticism and Michel Collot's theory of the "structure of the horizon", and the poem "Duri va..." according to Paul Werth's theory of "text worlds"; his poetry has also been studied alongside that of Kiumars Monshizadeh using Geoffrey Leech's model.

In an article in the quarterly Motale'at-e honar-e eslami (2024), Leila Amini, Shahin Ojagh Alizadeh and Seyyedeh Mandana Hashemi Esfahani count Babachahi and Reza Baraheni among the major poets of the "Seventies decade" (the 1990s) and study "polyphony" in their work as one of the hallmarks of postmodernism. According to this study, polyphony in their poetry arises from metre and music, distinctions of language and the contrast between formal and colloquial registers, "disseminative writing" and "mad writing", and the presence of a schizophrenic character, and leads to "escaping the tyranny of monologue", narrative rupture and the rejection of the vertical axis and thematic unity. In another article, published in Sabk-shenasi-ye nazm va nasr-e farsi (February–March 2025), the same researchers study Babachahi's "disseminative poetry", a notion derived, in their account, from Derrida's "dissemination" and extended in the poetry of the 1990s from the reading of the text to its production. They identify as its main components polyphony, reading the blanks and reader participation, the dislocation of language and mad writing, humour and parody, the interweaving of times, the multiple figure of the lover and the beloved, and intertextuality. According to them, in most of the poems of the "fourth period" of his career Babachahi borrows, implicitly or explicitly, some of his words and notions from old texts, songs, ballads and popular proverbs.

Besides academic papers, several books have been devoted to Babachahi's poetry, including Ram va naram: Atashi – Babachahi ("Tame and Untamed: Atashi – Babachahi") by Nasrin Mozaffari and Marzieh Nowruzi, which studies his poetry alongside that of Manouchehr Atashi; Be samt-e chehreh-ha-ye mokhtalefi by Ebrahim Mohebbi, on the style of his poetry and that of Abbas Saffari; Barkhord-e menghar-e parandeh be laleh-ye gush by Hossein Bagheri, on "deconstruction" in ten of his collections from the 2010s; and Gosast-ha va peyvast-ha-ye revayi dar ash'ar-e Ali Babachahi by Javid Takavaran.

== Awards and honours ==
Ahmad Shamlou Poetry Prize
In kashti-ye por-asrar (This Mysterious Ship)
Ali Babachahi · Negah Publishing, Tehran, 1393 SH (2014)

Cover of In kashti-ye por-asrar (This Mysterious Ship) by Ali Babachahi

Joint winner of the inaugural Ahmad Shamlou Poetry Prize (1394 SH), alongside Mohammad Shams Langeroodi’s Manzumeh-ye bazgasht va ash'ar-e digar.
Award ceremony: 18 Dey 1394 (8 January 2016), at Ahmad Shamlou’s house
- Joint winner of the first Ahmad Shamlou Poetry Prize (awarded in January 2016) for the collection In kashti-ye por-asrar (Negah, 2014), together with Mohammad Shams Langeroodi's Manzumeh-ye bazgasht va ash'ar-e digar. The ceremony was held on 8 January 2016 at Ahmad Shamlou's house.
- Tribute (14 March 2012): the Maya literary group held a ceremony in Babachahi's honour at the Khaneh-ye Mashgh cultural centre in Tehran, at which the documentary In ghiyafeh-ye mashkuk was screened for the first time.

== Works ==
According to the statement of the Writers' Association of Iran, Babachahi published twenty-seven collections of poetry, seven books of literary criticism and theory and five works of research. KhabarOnline mentions more than thirty-five volumes.

Years are given in the Solar Hijri calendar, followed by the corresponding Gregorian year (the Solar Hijri year begins around 21 March and therefore spans two Gregorian years).

=== Poetry collections ===
The list below is based on press sources:

- Dar bi-tekyegahi ("Without Support", 1346/1967)
- Jahan va roshanayi-ha-ye ghamnak ("The World and the Melancholy Lights", 1349/1970)
- Az nasl-e aftab ("Of the Lineage of the Sun", 1353/1974; year recorded by the National Library: 1352/1973) – Mehrdad, Roz
- Seda-ye shen ("The Voice of Sand", 1356/1977) – Ebn-e Sina, Tabriz
- Jashn-e jonun ("The Feast of Madness", 1359/1980)
- Az khak-eman aftab bar-mi-ayad ("From Our Soil the Sun Rises", 1360/1981) – Behnam, Tabriz
- Ava-ye darya-mardan ("The Song of the Sea-Men", 1368/1989) – Asr-e jadid
- Gozineh-ye ash'ar ("Selected Poems", 1369/1990, Veys; 2nd ed. 1372/1993, Dorsa)
- Nam-nam-e baranam ("I Am the Drizzle", 1375/1996, Darinush; 2nd ed., Nashr-e Cheshmeh) ISBN 9786002290816
- Manzel-ha-ye darya bi-neshan ast ("The Stations of the Sea Leave No Trace", 1376/1997, Tekapu; new ed. 1400/2021, Patizeh) ISBN 9786229567203
- Aghl azabam mi-dahad ("Reason Torments Me", 1379/2000, Hamrah; 2nd ed. 1392/2013, Zavosh) ISBN 9786006846095
- Ghiyafeh-am ke kheyli mashkuk ast ("I Really Do Look Very Suspicious", 1381/2002) – Navid-e Shiraz and Rashin
- Rafteh budam be seyd-e nahang ("I Had Gone Whale Hunting", 1382/2003) – Panda, Mashhad
- Gozineh-ye ash'ar ("Selected Poems", 1383/2004; 4th ed. 1391/2012) – Morvarid ISBN 9789641911982
- Picasso dar ab-ha-ye Khalij-e Fars ("Picasso in the Waters of the Persian Gulf", 1388/2009; 2nd ed. 1390/2011) – Sales ISBN 9789643803100
- Faghat az pariyan-e daryayi zakhm-e zaban nemi-khorad ("Only the Mermaids Spare Him Their Barbs", 1388/2009) – Navid-e Shiraz
- Gol-baran-e hezar-ruzeh ("A Thousand-Day Shower of Flowers", 1390/2011; 2nd ed. 1393/2014) – Morvarid ISBN 9789641911357
- Hush-o havas-e gol-e shab-bu bara-ye man kafi-st ("The Wits of the Night-Scented Stock Are Enough for Me", 1391/2012) – Sales ISBN 9789643807832
- Donya eshtebah mi-konad ("The World Is Mistaken", 1391/2012) – Zavosh ISBN 9786009093991
- Bia gush-mahi jam' konim ("Come, Let's Gather Seashells", short poems, 1391/2012) – Sales ISBN 9789643808563
- Be shiveh-ye khodeshan ashegh mi-shavand ("They Fall in Love in Their Own Way", love poems, 1391/2012) – Morvarid ISBN 9789641912118
- Bagh-e anar az in taraf ast ("The Pomegranate Garden Is This Way", poems of 1390–1391; 1392/2013) – Negah ISBN 9789643517700
- Dar ghar-ha-ye por az narges ("In the Caves Full of Narcissus", 1392/2013) – Negah ISBN 9789643518455
- Majmu'eh-ye ash'ar ("Collected Poems", vol. 1, 1392/2013; 2nd ed. 1400/2021, 1,056 pp.) – Negah ISBN 9789643518356; brings together the collections Dar bi-tekyegahi, Jahan va roshanayi-ha-ye ghamnak, Az nasl-e aftab, Seda-ye shen, Az khak-eman aftab bar-mi-ayad, Ava-ye darya-mardan, Ba gol-e narenj ("With the Orange Blossom"), Manzel-ha-ye darya bi-neshan ast, Nam-nam-e baranam, Aghl azabam mi-dahad, Ghiyafeh-am ke kheyli mashkuk ast, Rafteh budam be seyd-e nahang and Gharghi-ha ("The Drowned")
- In kashti-ye por-asrar ("This Mysterious Ship", 1393/2014) – Negah ISBN 9789643518721
- Otagh bar ab rah mi-ravam ("Room, I Walk on Water", 1394/2015) – Sarzamin-e Ahurayi ISBN 9786006792408
- Ghashangi-ye donya be hamin ast ("That Is the Beauty of the World", 1395/2016) – Dariche ISBN 9789648072143
- Adam-ha dar ghorub esm nadarand ("People Have No Names at Sunset", 1395/2016) – Negah ISBN 9786003761247
- Aura va digaran-e man ("Aura and My Others", 1395/2016) – Patizeh ISBN 9786009618415
- In ketab ham adam ast! Ashegh mi-shavad ("This Book Is Human Too! It Falls in Love", 1397/2018; year recorded by the National Library: 1396/2017) – Sarzamin-e Ahurayi ISBN 9786006792910
- Joseph, to morakhkhasi! ("Joseph, You May Go!", an anthology selected by the poet from all his collections, with an essay entitled "The Action of the Social"; 1397/2018, 274 pp.) – Mania Honar ISBN 9786008975083
- Jahan motavajjeh shod (she'r-ha-ye e'teraz) ("The World Realised (Poems of Protest)", 1st ed. 1401) – Nashr-e Aftab, Norway ISBN 978-1-4709-0021-2

In 1403/2024 the publisher Ketab-e Hormoz reissued Dar bi-tekyegahi (ISBN 9786228365534) and Aghl azabam mi-dahad, and in 1404/2025 published a volume entitled Dar ghar-ha-ye nargesi ("In the Narcissus Caves"), edited by Abdollah Soleimani (ISBN 9786228365824).

=== Poetry for young readers ===
- Soghat-e bahar: yek she'r-e boland bara-ye kudakan va nowjavanan ("The Gift of Spring: A Long Poem for Children and Young People", Tabriz; year recorded by the National Library: 1337/1958)
- Che kasi dar-e ghafas ra baz kard? ("Who Opened the Cage Door?", 1356/1977) – Ebn-e Sina, Tabriz

=== Literary criticism and theory ===
Sources for this list:

- Gozareh-ha-ye monfared ("Isolated Propositions", a critical study of today's Iranian poetry), vol. 1 (1376/1997, Narenj); vol. 2 (1380/2001, Sepanta); three-volume edition (1389/2010, Dibayeh; ISBN 9789649961545)
- Se daheh sha'eran-e herfe'i ("Three Decades of Professional Poets", 1381/2002, 488 pp.) – Vistar
- Asheghaneh-tarin-ha ("The Most Amorous", a selection and study of poems from 1300 to 1380 [1921–2001]; 1384/2005) – Sales
- Birun paridan az saf ("Jumping Out of Line", interviews, reviews and articles, compiled by Maziar Neyestani; 1385/2006, Mefragh-negar; new ed. 1397/2018, Patizeh) ISBN 9786009618446
- She'r-e emruz, zan-e emruz ("Today's Poetry, Today's Woman", selection and study; 1386/2007, 528 pp.) – Vistar
- Gozareh-ha-ye peyvast ("Joined Propositions", ninety years of new Persian poetry; 1393/2014, 622 pp.) – Dibayeh ISBN 9789649961750
- Ta'ammolat; az sefr ("Reflections; From Zero", reviews and articles; 2nd ed. 1398/2019, 255 pp.) – Negah ISBN 9786003762176; according to Babachahi's introduction, the title repeats that of a series of pieces published earlier under this name in a literary magazine and later collected in Birun paridan az saf, but none of those pieces is included in this book.

=== Research and anthologies ===
Sources for this list:

- Sharveh-sarayi dar jonub-e Iran ("Sharveh Singing in Southern Iran", 1369/1990, Eghbal-e Lahuri; new ed. 1396/2017, Patizeh) ISBN 9786009618422; a study of the sharveh
- Selected poems of Manouchehr Sheybani (selection and study; 1373/1994) – Morvarid
- In bang-e delaviz ("This Enchanting Voice", the life and poetry of Fereidoon Tavallali; 1380/2001; 2nd ed. 1398/2019) – Sales ISBN 9789647230018
- Selected poems of Manouchehr Neyestani (1384/2005) – Morvarid
- Zibatar az jonun ("More Beautiful than Madness", the life and poetry of Esmail Shahroudi; 1387/2008; 5th ed. 1403/2024) – Sales ISBN 9789643803544

=== Selected articles ===
- "The Third Wave: A Vague and Suspended Definition", Adineh, no. 24, May–June 1988
- "Fifty-Seven Years of New Persian Poetry", Adineh, no. 25, June–July 1988
- "Poetic Currents from the 1960s to the Present", Adineh, no. 26, July–August 1988
- "The Allure of Images and the Emotional Ferment of Words", Adineh, no. 28, September–October 1988
- "Axes and Characteristics of Post-Nimaic Poetry", Karnameh, no. 4, March–May 1999
- "The Crisis of Poetry and the Ways Out of It", Farhang-e towse'eh, no. 49, May–June 2001
- "Hafez and the Culture of Language Games", Salnameh-ye Hafez-pazhuhi ("Yearbook of Hafez Studies"), no. 6, 2003
- "The Boundless Expanse of Meaning", Rudaki, no. 22, 2008
- "Princes Are Sometimes Less Hung-Up than the Toiling Proletariat", Mehrnameh, no. 26, October–November 2012
- "On the Poem 'My Memories' by Ahmadreza Ahmadi", Barg-e honar, no. 32, Winter 2021–2022

=== Interviews ===
==== In book form ====
- Tarikh-e shafahi-ye adabiyat-e mo'aser-e Iran ("Oral History of Contemporary Iranian Literature"), vol. 5 (interview with Ali Babachahi by Abdollah Sadat-Madani; general editor Mohammad-Hashem Akbariani; 1384/2005) – Ruznegar
- Dari be otagh-e monaghesheh ("A Door to the Room of Controversy", a collection of the interviews Babachahi gave over some thirty-five years of literary activity; about 500 pp.; 1394/2015) – Negah ISBN 9786003760547

The book Birun paridan az saf (1385/2006) contains, besides reviews and articles, several of his interviews (see Literary criticism and theory).

==== In magazines and newspapers ====
- "Volume Poetry: Guess Who's Coming to Define 'Volume'!" (round table with Shams Aghajani, Ali Babachahi, Mozaffar Royaee and Yazdan Salahshour), Baya, no. 41, 2006
- "The Muddy Water of Poetry" (round table between Ali Babachahi and Mohammad Shams Langeroodi on the state of current poetry, part one), Shargh, no. 1882, 17 November 2013, p. 9
- "Being a Postmodernist Is Not My Burning Desire!" (interview with Babachahi by Ali Abdollahi), Cinema va adabiyat, no. 39, Winter 2013–2014

==== News agencies, websites and other media ====
- "Today's Poets' Attention to Psychological Deep Structure Is a Kind of Mysticism", Mehr News Agency, 17 October 2006
- "Shamlou Published Poems He Did Not Like / At Any Moment We Could Overturn!" (interview with Babachahi by Shahab Darabian on his fifty years of poetry), IBNA, 1 January 2018
- "I See Cyberspace the Way I Saw Adineh / I Am Still Standing" (interview on his seventy-seventh birthday), IBNA, 11 November 2019
- "Some Did Not Get On Well with 'Royaee-esque' Poems" (interview with Babachahi by Neda Valipour about Yadollah Royaee), ISNA, 17 September 2022
- "Ali Babachahi's Account of the Course of Contemporary Poetry / The Compulsion to Write Differently" (interview with Babachahi by Shirzad Bastami which, according to IBNA, was conducted in the mid-2010s on the sidelines of a poetry congress in Khorramabad and published after his death), IBNA, 26 February 2026

==== Interviews and readings in Persian-language media outside Iran ====
- "Is Being in Love an Accusation? I Accept It" (interview with Babachahi by Mojtaba Pourmohsen on the role of love in poetry), Radio Zamaneh, 15 February 2008
- Reading for Radio Zamaneh: after the award ceremony of the first Ahmad Shamlou Poetry Prize, Babachahi read two poems from his prize-winning collection In kashti-ye por-asrar for the outlet (report by Mohammad Tangestani, 10 January 2016).
- "Ey…" and two other poems: three poems from the protest collection Jahan motavajjeh shod which, according to the literary magazine Bang (an independent magazine published outside Iran by Shahriar Mandanipour and Hossein Noushazar), the poet chose himself for the magazine (20 April 2023).

=== Recordings (readings) ===
- Emza-ye yadegari: gozideh-ye ash'ar-e Ali Babachahi ("Keepsake Signature: Selected Poems of Ali Babachahi", read by the poet; 1388/2009) – Tahghighat-e nazari, Isfahan
- In-towri fekr mi-konad ("He Thinks This Way", read by the poet; poems from Picasso dar ab-ha-ye Khalij-e Fars; 1391/2012) – Mo'asseseh-ye shabakeh-ye sowti-ye Khosh-bayan
- Reading on the seventh of the Ten Nights of Goethe (16 October 1977; audio recording, 3:35), published on the Azadi website

=== Translations ===
Babachahi's poems have been translated into languages including English, Dutch, Kurdish and Arabic.

- In ham yek shukhi bud (This Too Was a Joke, a bilingual selection of poems translated into English by Saeed Saeedpour; edited by Ayoub Sadeghiani; 1390/2011; year recorded by the National Library: 1389/2010) – Vistar
- Az ruz-ha-ye roshan ("Of Bright Days", a selection of poems translated into Kurdish by Babak Sahranavard)

== Works about Babachahi ==
=== Documentary films ===
- In ghiyafeh-ye mashkuk ("This Suspicious Face", 2011), a 90-minute documentary directed by Vahid Alizadeh Razzazi on Babachahi's poetry and life, filmed in summer 2011. Houshang Chalangi, Masoud Behnoud, Mohammad Mohammad-Ali, Mohammad Ghaed, Media Kashigar, Ahmad Pouri, Fathollah Biniaz, Farkhondeh Hajizadeh, Behzad Khajat, Reza Ameri, Ardeshir Rostami, Ali Abdollahi, Alireza Mojabi and Babak Sahranavard speak in it about Babachahi's poetic and personal sides. The film was first screened on 14 March 2012 at the tribute ceremony organised by the Maya literary group at the Khaneh-ye Mashgh cultural centre in Tehran.
- Bavar konid in ham yek shukhi bud ("Believe Me, This Too Was a Joke", 2014), a documentary directed by Mohsen Mousavi Mirkalaei. It was released in 1396/2017 by Sarzamin-e Ahurayi as a DVD box set accompanied by a 66-page book entitled Bavar konid: in ham yek shukhi bud! ISBN 9786006792477

=== Books ===
- Ketab-e Derang ("The Book of Pause", first issue: the poetry and life of Ali Babachahi; edited by Mohammad Loutij) – Tahghighat-e nazari, Isfahan; the Elmnet database lists this book under the title "Ketab-e rang: special issue on the literary life of Ali Babachahi" and the year 1387/2008.
- Haftad gol-e zard: Ali Babachahi dar vaz'iyat-e digar ("Seventy Yellow Flowers: Ali Babachahi in Another Situation", compiled by Mohammad Loutij; 1st ed. 1393/2014, 240 pp.) – Sarzamin-e Ahurayi ISBN 9786006792194; according to the book's description on Iran Ketab, it does not cover the first three decades of Babachahi's poetic career but re-reads the features of his poetry from Nam-nam-e baranam onwards and, rather than judging the quality of the poems, seeks to give the reader "keys to reading the poems" through an analysis of their components.
- Farrokh Latifnejad, Nahveh-ye tashkil va daryaft-e matn dar ash'ar-e mo'aser (Nima, Sepehri va Babachahi) ("The Formation and Reception of the Text in Contemporary Poetry: Nima, Sepehri and Babachahi"), Sokhan, 1396/2017.
- Nasrin Mozaffari and Marzieh Nowruzi, Ram va naram: Atashi – Babachahi ("Tame and Untamed: Atashi – Babachahi"), Shalak, 1397/2018.
- Ebrahim Mohebbi, Be samt-e chehreh-ha-ye mokhtalefi: tahlil-e sabki-ye ash'ar-e Ali Babachahi va Abbas Saffari bar asas-e nazariyeh-ye shenakhti ("Towards Different Faces: A Stylistic Analysis of the Poems of Ali Babachahi and Abbas Saffari Based on Cognitive Theory"), Patizeh, 1400/2021.
- Feyz Sharifi, Ali Babachahi, edited by Leila Sabourizadeh, Hess-e haftom, 1400/2021.
- Hossein Bagheri, Barkhord-e menghar-e parandeh be laleh-ye gush: shaludeh-shekani dar ash'ar-e Ali Babachahi ("The Bird's Beak Striking the Earlobe: Deconstruction in the Poems of Ali Babachahi", ten collections published in the 2010s), Patizeh, 1402/2023.
- Abdollah Soleimani (ed.), Ali Babachahi, Afraz, 1402/2023.
- Javid Takavaran, Gosast-ha va peyvast-ha-ye revayi dar ash'ar-e Ali Babachahi (az Nam-nam-e baranam ta Aura va digaran-e man) ("Narrative Ruptures and Continuities in the Poems of Ali Babachahi"), Kherad-e Javid, 1403/2024.

=== Research articles ===
- Mohammad-Jalil Bahadori and Hassan Zolfaghari, "Temporal Sequence in Poetry from a Post-Structuralist Perspective (with Reference to the Poetry of Ali Babachahi)", Zibayi-shenasi-ye adabi, no. 13, Autumn 2012.
- Ebrahim Mohebbi, Mazaher Nikkhah and Mohammad Hakimazar, "A Reading of Two Poems by Ali Babachahi Based on Schema Theory in Cognitive Stylistics", She'r-pazhuhi (Bustan-e adab), no. 3, Autumn 2019.
- Mohammad-Amin Ehsani Estahbanati and Mohammad-Reza Sarfi, "Babachahi and the Linguistic Components of Postmodern Poetry", Motale'at-e balaghi, vol. 12, no. 23, Spring 2021.
- Behzad Khajat, "A Comparative Study of a Poem by Ali Babachahi and One by Shams Langeroodi Based on Gilles Deleuze's Rhizomatic Theory", Ghand-e parsi, vol. 4, no. 13, Winter 2021–2022.
- Ali Mohammadi and Tahereh Ghassemi, "The 'Title' in the Poems of Ali Babachahi, from Realism to Postmodernism", Dehkhoda, vol. 14, no. 51, Spring 2022.
- Mehran Alivand, Kazem Dezfoulian and Ghodratollah Taheri, "An Analysis of the Sunset Landscape in the Poem 'Pasingahi 2' by Ali Babachahi in the Light of Michel Collot's Theory of the Structure of the Horizon", Adabiyat-e parsi-ye mo'aser, vol. 12, no. 1, Spring–Summer 2022.
- Zakieh Mohammadlou, Barat Mohammadi and Seyfeddin Abbarin, "A Study, Critique and Analysis of the Forms of Semantic Deviation in the Poetry of Ali Babachahi", Zibayi-shenasi-ye adabi, vol. 13, no. 52, Summer 2022.
- Ronak Joharzadeh, Shahrokh Hekmat and Majid Azizi, "An Aesthetic Analysis of Postmodernist Manifestations in Ali Babachahi's Two Collections Nam-nam-e baranam and Aghl azabam mi-dahad", Zibayi-shenasi-ye adabi, vol. 13, no. 53, Autumn 2022.
- Mahboubeh Shirgardoun, "Aesthetic Manifestations in the Poems of Ali Babachahi (A Study of Seven Collections)", Zibayi-shenasi-ye adabi, vol. 13, no. 53, Autumn 2022.
- Farrokh Latifnejad Roudsari, "The Role of the Deictic World in Identifying the Epistemic World of the Poem 'Duri va...' by Babachahi, Based on Paul Werth's Cognitive Poetics of Text Worlds", Naghd va nazariyeh-ye adabi, vol. 7, no. 2, Autumn–Winter 2022–2023.
- Asieh Hosseinalizadeh, Hanieh Sadri Majd and Shahparak Farahbakhsh Esfahan, "A Formalist Critique of the Poems of Kiumars Monshizadeh and Ali Babachahi Based on Geoffrey Leech's Model", Ganjineh-ye zaban va adabiyat-e farsi, vol. 2, no. 1, Spring 2024.
- Leila Amini, Shahin Ojagh Alizadeh and Seyyedeh Mandana Hashemi Esfahani, "Polyphony in the Poems of Ali Babachahi and Reza Baraheni Compared with Simile in Contemporary Visual Arts", Motale'at-e honar-e eslami, vol. 21, no. 54, Summer 2024.
- Leila Amini, Shahin Ojagh Alizadeh and Seyyedeh Mandana Hashemi, "Disseminative Poetry in the 1990s, with Reference to the Poems of Ali Babachahi", Sabk-shenasi-ye nazm va nasr-e farsi, vol. 17, no. 106, February–March 2025.
- Amir Salajegheh, Mansour Nikpanah and Mostafa Salari, "Techniques of Post-Nimaic Syntactic Deviation in the Poetry of the Leading Poets of the 1990s", Sabk-shenasi-ye nazm va nasr-e farsi, vol. 18, no. 113, September–October 2025.

=== Reviews in literary magazines ===
- Narges Bagheri, "She'r-e emruz, zan-e emruz at a Glance", Ketab-e mah-e adabiyat, no. 21 (serial no. 135), December 2008 – January 2009.
- Simin Behbahani, "A Look at Some Poems by Babachahi", Chameh, no. 23, April–June 2022.
- Abdolali Dastgheib, "Postmodernism in Babachahi's Poems", Jahan-e Ketab, vol. 15, nos. 3–4 (serial no. 254), May–July 2010.
- Abdolali Dastgheib, "The Novelties of Babachahi's Poetry Are More of This Place", Chameh, no. 23, April–June 2022.

=== Conference papers ===
- Ghahreman Shiri, "Speech Poetry and Post-Nimaic Poetry", Afsaneh national conference, 1389/2010.
- Jalil Shakeri and Somayeh Mohammadinasab, "Linguistic Foregrounding in the Poetry of Ali Babachahi Based on Geoffrey Leech's Linguistic Model", conference on Research in Persian Language and Literature, 1394/2015.
- Nasrin Mozaffari and Marzieh Nowruzi, "The Place of Love in the Poems of Manouchehr Atashi and Ali Babachahi", International Congress of Language and Literature, 1395/2016.
- Nasrin Mozaffari and Marzieh Nowruzi, "Ali Babachahi and His Meditations on Death", 4th International Congress of Culture and Religious Thought, 1397/2018.
- Nasrin Mozaffari and Marzieh Nowruzi, "A Sociological Study of Art in the Poems of Ali Babachahi", Congress of Biological Anthropology and Humanities, 1397/2018.
- Ziba Ghalavandi and Javid Takavaran, "Types of Narrative Rupture in the Poems of Ali Babachahi", 1st National Conference on Literary Research with a Comparative Approach, 1397/2018.
- Ziba Ghalavandi and Javid Takavaran, "Narrative Ruptures and Continuities in the Poems of Ali Babachahi (from Nam-nam-e baranam to Aura va digaran-e man)", 2nd International Conference on Persian Language and Literature, 1397/2018.
- Fatemeh Sadeghi Naghdali Olya and Fatemeh Rostampour, "Avoidance of Metaphor in the Poetry of Ali Babachahi", 13th International Meeting of the Association for the Promotion of Persian Language and Literature, 1397/2018.

=== Theses ===
- Sara Khazaei, "Foregrounding in the Poems of Ali Babachahi", master's thesis, Arak University, 1389/2010.
- Tahereh Bazzi, "The Image of the Beloved in the Poems of Ali Babachahi", master's thesis, University of Zabol, 1392/2013.
- Tahereh Hashemi, "Binary Oppositions in the Poems of Ali Babachahi", master's thesis, University of Zabol, 1393/2014.
- Mahmoud Palash, "A Study of Regional Elements and Localism in the Poetry of Ali Babachahi", master's thesis, University of Zabol, 1393/2014.
- Somayeh Mohammadinasab, "A Study and Explanation of the Components of Postmodernist Poetry in the Poems of Reza Baraheni, Ali Babachahi and Yadollah Royaee", master's thesis, Vali-e-Asr University of Rafsanjan, 1393/2014.
- Amir Mahdavi Hafshejani, "An Analytical Study of the Relations between Form and Meaning in Iranian Poetry of the 1990s (Based on the Poems and Views of Reza Baraheni, Ali Babachahi, Hafez Mousavi, Shams Aghajani, Mehrdad Fallah, Ali Abdolrezaei, Mohammad Azarm and Granaz Moussavi)", master's thesis, Islamic Azad University, Central Tehran Branch, 1393/2014.
- Abdolrasoul Torabi, "The Use of Humour and Its Forms in the Poems of Ali Babachahi", master's thesis, Payame Noor University, Fars province, 1394/2015.
- Farrokh Latifnejad Roudsari, "Textuality in Contemporary Poetry, Based on the Poems of Nima, Sepehri and Babachahi", doctoral thesis, Ferdowsi University of Mashhad, 1394/2015.

=== Coverage in Persian-language media outside Iran ===
- "The Chain Murders Revisited Seven Years On, Part Three: The Bus of Death" (Babachahi's name appears in the list of passengers of the Armenia bus), Radio Farda, 24 November 2005.
- Faraj Sarkohi, "Seven Days, Books: Babachahi's Poetry, a Play by Ostad-Mohammad and Salahi's Turkish Poetry" (a review of Gol-baran-e hezar-ruzeh), BBC Persian, 27 October 2011.
- Jamshid Barzegar, "Anniversary of the 'Journey of Death': A Bus That No Longer Moves?", BBC Persian, 6 August 2015.
- Esfandiar Koucheh, "Jahan motavajjeh shod: The Protest Poems of Ali Babachahi", Radio Zamaneh, 12 May 2023.
- "Ali Babachahi, Poet and Literary Critic, Has Died", BBC Persian, 23 February 2026.
- "Ali Babachahi, Poet and Literary Critic, Dies at 83", Radio Farda, 23 February 2026.
- "Ali Babachahi, Poet and Literary Critic, Has Died", Iran Emrooz, 23 February 2026.
- Hessam Mahjoubi, "When They Chanted against Ali Babachahi: 'Dictator, Hurry Up, Print Our Poems!'", BBC Persian, 24 February 2026.
- Hossein Noushazar, "Ali Babachahi's Jahan motavajjeh shod: When Mahboubeh Cries Out", Radio Zamaneh, 24 February 2026.
- Writers' Association of Iran, "Statement of the Writers' Association of Iran on the Death of Ali Babachahi" (reprint), Iran Emrooz, 24 February 2026.

== See also ==
- Persian literature
