= Assassination attempt on the Iranian writers' bus =

The assassination attempt on the Iranian writers' bus or Armenia's bus story was one of the issues raised in the chain murders of Iran series that happened in 1996. In this operation, the Intelligence Organization of the Islamic Republic of Iran planned to kill a number of writers and poets, but it did not succeed. The film Manuscripts Don't Burn by Mohammad Rasoulof is about this incident.

The motive of the trip was an invitation of an Armenian-Iranian individual from the members of the Writers' Association of Iran for cultural exchange and holding poetry sessions, speeches and press interviews for three nights. The Union of Armenian Writers had officially invited the guests and the correctness of this invitation was confirmed by Houshang Golshiri and Mansour Koushan by the Armenian Embassy. Ghaffar Hosseini became suspicious of the incident at the same time and said clearly: "They will send all of you to the bottom of the valley!" Also, at the last moment, the bus and the passengers terminal were changed, but the issue was not taken seriously.

From the initial list Ahmad Shamlou, Houshang Golshiri and Reza Baraheni refused to go on the trip and finally 21 people boarded the bus: Mohammad-Ali Sepanlou, Ali Babachahi, Javad Mojabi, Masoud Behnoud, Siros Alinejad, Amir Hassan Cheheltan, Bijan Bijari, Bijan Najdi, Mohammed Mohammad Ali, Shahriar Mandanipour, Shapour Jourkesh, Masoud Tufan, Hasan Asghari, Manochehar Karimzadeh, Kamran Jalili, Mahmoud Tayari , Faraj Sarkohi, Fereshte Sari, Majid Danesharaste, Ali Siddiqi and Mansour Koushan.

In November 1999, one of the passengers published the memories of this trip in the newspaper Aftab Emrzom. Tufan narrated that the driver jumped out of the moving bus for the first time and he stopped the fall by grabbing the steering wheel of the bus. After that, the driver got back into the bus and said that he got off to put a stone under the tire and started driving again. A little later, he jumped out of the bus again and Tufan took the wheel again and Shahriar Mandanipour pulled the handbrake.

The writers went to the police station and reported the incident. The intelligence officer, Moustafa Kazemi, took them to Astara prison and threatened to keep the story quiet.
