= Faraj Sarkohi =

Iranian literary critic and journalist

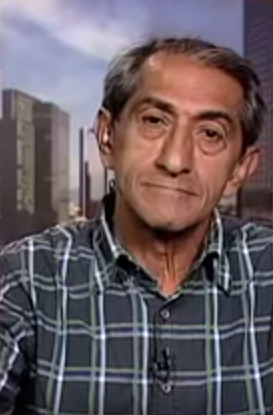
Faraj Sarkohi, 2012

Faraj Sarkohi (Persian: فرج سرکوهی, born 3 November 1947, in Shiraz) is an Iranian literary critic and journalist. He was cofounder and editor in chief of the Iranian magazine Adineh.

== Life ==
=== Early life, education and prison ===
Faraj Sarkohi went to school in Shiraz. He studied Persian literature and social science at the University of Tabriz, participating in the group around Samad Behrangi. He published Adineh, a student magazine. He embarked in different activities against the Shah and wrote a number of dissident articles, which resulted in a three-month prison sentence in 1966 and another one-year sentence in 1967, followed by a final 15-year prison sentence in 1971. He was amnestied in 1978 just before the Iranian Revolution, along with many other political prisoners.

=== After the Revolution ===
During the following time of relative political freedom, he went on to publish articles for the magazines Tehran Mossavar and Iran. When the Islamic regime started to suppress all dissident political forces and publications, Sarkohi was forced into retirement from public life.

=== Adineh ===
He founded Adineh in 1985, together with Massoud Behnoud, Sirus Alinejad, Golamhossein Zakeri, and served as editor in chief from 1988 to 1996. Adineh became known as the most important, independent magazine for art, politics, and culture in the 1980s and 1990s in Iran. In addition to being Adineh’s editor in chief, he published many reviews and essays and interviewed some important figures of Iranian life, like Hossein Alizâdeh, Ahmad Shamloo, Houshang Golshiri, Alireza Espahbod, Mahmoud Dowlatabadi, Mehdi Bazargan and Parviz Natel-Khanlari.

Sarkohi took part in forming a commission that reassessed the written Persian language and published the results in Adineh.

=== Writers Association ===
Sarkohi was influential in the reformation of the Iranian writers association since 1980. The association’s activities culminated in 1994 when an open letter was published that later rose to fame as the "Text of the 134". In it, 134 renowned Iranian writers, poets, journalists, and translators demanded more freedom of speech in Iran.

Sarkohi as a member of the "Commission of Eight" along with Houshang Golshiri, Sima Kuban, Reza Baraheni, Mohammad Mokhtari, Mansour Koushan, Mohammad Mohammadali, Mohammad Khalili), took part in the origination of the text, and the collection of signatures.

=== Armenia Bus Incident ===
In the 1996 Armenia bus incident—an episode later linked to the chain murders of Iran—he was among the Iranian writers placed on a state-organized cultural trip whose bus was allegedly meant to be driven into a ravine in an attempt by the Iranian government to kill its passengers. The film Manuscripts Don’t Burn by Mohammad Rasoulof was inspired by this event.

=== Imprisonment and exile ===
Due to his function as editor in chief of Adineh, and his participation in the writers association, Sarkohi was exposed to continuous repression on the part of the regime and was imprisoned temporarily a number of times. In 1996 he was kidnapped by the Iranian secret service, the Ministry of Intelligence, while on his way to visit his family in Germany. Iranian officials announced that Sarkohi had landed in Germany in good health. After 48 days of captivity and torture in an unknown place, he was released and forced to hold a press conference, announcing he had returned to Iran after his trip to Europe. A few weeks later he was imprisoned again, under the accusation of having wanted to leave the country illegally. In between these two arrests he wrote a letter to his wife in Germany, which was later named "The Plaint of Faraj Sarkohi". In it, he gave an account of the true circumstances of his imprisonment and the oppression of writers and intellectuals in Iran. Owing to the efforts of his wife, international protests by numerous human rights organizations, and involvement from some Western governments (for example German Secretary of State Klaus Kinkel wrote two letters to his Iranian colleague Ali Akbar Velayati about Sarkohi), he was not executed but sentenced to one year of prison. In conclusion, worldwide protest compelled the Iranian government to grant Sarkohi an exit permit when he was released in 1998. According to some sources, Sarkohi’s imprisonment and its circumstances were associated with the Mykonos restaurant assassinations case, which was tried in Berlin at that time. Supposedly the Iranian regime tried to influence the trial to its benefit by capturing him.

=== Life in Germany ===
Sarkohi traveled to Germany, where he lodged as guest of the project “Cities of Refuge” in Frankfurt. From 2000 to 2006 he was a scholarship holder of German P.E.N. Center’s “Writers in Exile” program. He is an honorary member of P.E.N. Center Germany and since 2006, human rights commissioner of the Center

He writes articles on Iranian culture and politics for German newspapers and magazines, like Die Zeit, Süddeutsche Zeitung and NZZ. In addition, he writes regular articles, reviews, and essays for the Persian news portal Radio Farda and for BBC Persian Online.

== Work ==
- Naghshi az Rouzegar (“Sketch of fate”), 1990, publisher: Shiva, Teheran
- Shab-e dardmand-e arezumandi (“The painful night of waiting”), 1999, publisher: Baran, Stockholm
- Yas-o-das (“Lylac and Scythe”), 2002, publisher: Baran, Stockholm
- Das Gelb gereifter Zitronen ("The Yellow of ripe lemons”), in: Sinn und Form, iss.: 3/2001, publisher: Aufbau-Verlag, Berlin

== Awards ==
- 1998: Kurt-Tucholsky-Prize for politically persecuted authors
- 1999: World Association of Newspapers' Golden Pen of Freedom Award
- 2000: World Press Freedom Hero (award by the International Press Institute)

== About Sarkohi ==
“Look Europe”, drama by Ghazi Rabihavi, direction and cooperation: Harold Pinter.
