= Sepanlou =

Sepanlou is a surname. Notable people with the surname include:

- Mohammad-Ali Sepanlou (1940–2015), Iranian poet, author, and literary critic
- Shahrzad Sepanlou, American singer
