= This Suspicious Figure =

- DVD cover
- Directed by: Vahid Alizadeh Razzazi
- Produced by: Hamidreza Alizadeh Razzazi; Vahid Alizadeh Razzazi
- Cinematography: Ebrahim Asghari
- Edited by: Vahid Alizadeh Razzazi
- Release date: March 14, 2012 (Tehran)
- Running time: 90 minutes
- Country: Iran
- Language: Persian

This Suspicious Figure is a feature-length documentary film about the life and poetry of Ali Babachahi. Vahid Alizadeh Razzazi conceived, edited, and directed it in the summer of 2011. BBC Persian described the film as a documentary portrait that traces five decades of Babachahi's poetic life from several perspectives.

The film was first screened in Tehran in March 2012, at a ceremony honoring Babachahi. BBC Persian's Aparat program aired it in November 2012 and rebroadcast it in 2015 and 2016. In 2016, the documentary was also screened at a conference on Iranian culture at the Autonomous University of Madrid.

== Production ==
In October 2011, the newspaper Shargh reported that the 90-minute documentary was ready to be screened. In an interview with the paper, Razzazi said the filmmakers had tried “to avoid, as far as possible, the familiar conventions of films of this kind.” By varying the framing and lighting and creating settings suited to the poet's character, they sought to move beyond a mere literary profile and give the film a stronger cinematic dimension. Razzazi added that the list of people appearing on camera had been drawn up in consultation with Babachahi. According to him, Mohammad Mohammad-Ali and Masoud Behnoud recorded their views outside Iran and sent the recordings to the team; the other interviews were filmed in Tehran and Karaj.

BBC Persian reported that Razzazi had made several short fiction films and short experimental films; This Suspicious Figure was his first documentary. Ebrahim Asghari served as cinematographer, Mohammad Zamani-Asmati as sound recordist, Amir Ranjbaran as still photographer, and Fahimeh Emami as graphic designer. The film was produced by Hamidreza and Vahid Alizadeh Razzazi.

== Content ==
In This Suspicious Figure, a group of literary and artistic figures, along with Babachahi's wife, Farrokhandeh Bakhtiari, speak about his poetry and character. Among them are Houshang Chalangi, Masoud Behnoud, Mohammad Mohammad-Ali, Mohammad Ghaed, Media Kashigar, Ahmad Pouri, Fathollah Biy-Niaz, Farrokhandeh Hajizadeh, Behzad Khajehat, Reza Ameri, Ardeshir Rostami, Ali Abdollahi, Alireza Mojabi, and Babak Sahranavard.

The film opens with Babachahi reciting poetry amid traffic on a crowded highway. A mineral-water bottle drifting along a roadside gutter repeatedly reappears, linking the film's sections like an invisible thread. At times, passersby and people in the streets and bazaars also recite Babachahi's poems. In the closing sequences, a poem recited by Babachahi is translated line by line into German, English, and Arabic. The film pays little attention to the poet's private life, focusing instead on his poetry and its “nowness”—its engagement with the present.

== Screening and distribution ==
According to Shargh, a public screening in Tehran depended on cooperation with the relevant institutions and on securing a screening permit from the Ministry of Culture and Islamic Guidance. The film was first screened on March 14, 2012 (24 Esfand 1390), at a ceremony honoring Ali Babachahi, organized by the Maya Literary Group at the Khaneh-ye Mashq Cultural Center in Tehran.

In November 2012, on the occasion of Babachahi's seventieth birthday, BBC Persian's Aparat broadcast the film. Aparat broadcast the documentary twice more: once in October 2015, for Babachahi's seventy-third birthday, and again in November 2016. On the latter occasion, it also released a video trailer for the film.

BBC Persian
- Play the video
- “This Suspicious Figure” on Aparat 0:30 — Video trailer for the film, published November 3, 2016. Click the red play button or title to watch.

On the DVD’s back cover, Razzazi wrote the following text; BBC Persian also published the Persian original under the heading “The Director’s View”:

“This Suspicious Figure is not merely a film; nor is it simply a few moments to be seen and heard. It is, in truth, a poem of many purposes that pursues no particular purpose. It is intricate yet readily accessible, and it has a plurality of authors. Its central author has chosen the madness of writing so that he will not be trapped by everyday reason—or tormented by it. Suspicious, different, altogether of another ‘kind’: not set apart from others, but free—yes! He walks alone with himself for so long—never, however, without you—that he comes to take the shape of his own ‘self.’

Born in eternity with poetry, he has gone into the lanes and streets with poetry, returned home late with poetry, and lost his youth along the way, perhaps to find it in the ‘other condition’ in a future that is now. He has blended thought and lyricism; they have fused and frothed; then he has sprinkled the juice of this grape upon his poems, soaking his salt-and-pepper hair through and through.

Bushehr, I do not know whether in intoxication or … , he has grafted to Tehran; and now Tehran is his ‘think tank.’ And thought asks permission of no face: to lose the Mona Lisa’s smile in sleep or to find Picasso in the waters of the Persian Gulf. This figure flees becoming a portrait, a biography, even a film; yet in the end it is caught in the film’s seductive coils. And ‘this’ is the fate of a figure that, for fifty years, has not heeded the unworthy command to halt.”

— Vahid Alizadeh Razzazi, “The Director’s View”

In November 2016, Razzazi was invited to the international conference “Persian Culture: Perspectives on the Past and Present” (Cultura persa: miradas hacia el pasado y el presente) at the Faculty of Philosophy and Letters of the Autonomous University of Madrid, to introduce and screen the documentary under its Spanish title, Esa sospechosa cara. The screening was scheduled for the evening of November 8 in the conference's official program. The news agency EFE also reported on the screening in an article published by La Vanguardia.

== Critical reception ==
In a July 2012 review titled “A Figure in the Frame” on the specialist documentary website Raybon Documentary, Mahmoud Bita called the director's attempt to depict the very “suspicious figure” evoked by the title “praiseworthy.” In Bita's view, the film goes beyond conversations with the poet and those who interpret his work, reaching layers seldom seen in Iranian documentary cinema, including more intimate and unguarded moments in the poet's life. Bita writes that the camera captures natural, informal moments, from the minutes before formal filming begins to scenes from the natural world. In one such moment, Babachahi's recitation coincides with a flash of lightning, which, in Bita's words, “beautifully tells of the poet’s inner life.”

Bita also examines the film's visual motifs. Babachahi recalls his memories of Khosrow Golsorkhi, while a large red blotch is visible on a mural behind him. In Bita's interpretation, the blotch is a drop of blood alluding to Golsorkhi. The empty mineral-water bottle, which rolls along a gutter until the film's end, also carries, in Bita's view, a beautiful and “highly symbolic” meaning. He regards the closing sequences as a fresh innovation: there, a poem recited by Babachahi is translated line by line into German, English, and Arabic. The film, he writes, does more than introduce a poet; it rises to the level of a work of art.

According to Bita, the film does not explain life and death directly through the poet's words; instead, it lets these ideas emerge through his poems and recorded behavior. In the opening sequence, Babachahi is on the highway, still unable to find a place to sit and recite. Bita reads the scene as showing a tireless poet searching for the best possible setting for his poetry, still among the people at the age of seventy. In his view, the film's visual innovations gradually lift the mask from the poet's enigmatic appearance and reveal another side of him—one that, Bita suggests, was never hidden. He concludes that humor, “however bitter,” is inseparable from Babachahi's poetry.

In a review titled “The Only Destination Was to Never Arrive!”, published in the newspaper Etemad in August 2012, Afra Rahimi identified the film's distinctive form and relatively personal style as its most striking qualities. She wrote that biographical documentaries had, in recent years, become repetitive and tiresome, following a familiar formula: a well-known person is chosen, a few friends are brought before the camera, and the person's life is narrated from childhood onward. Rahimi said that although the film sometimes falls into similar clichés, its coherence, visual variety, and personal voice set it apart to a considerable extent.

Rahimi sees the opening, in which Babachahi recites in the middle of a highway amid the roar of traffic, as a compelling invitation to viewers, and connects it with poetry's place in contemporary life. She praises the film's sincerity and unpretentiousness, noting that, unlike many documentaries of this kind, it does not simply extol its subject and maintains a measure of critical distance. In her view, the film pays less attention to Babachahi's private life and biography, focusing instead on his poetic world and its “nowness.” As Rahimi puts it, for the filmmaker “the poet’s life as told through his poetry” matters more than the poet himself.

Rahimi also discusses the film's visual play, including a conversation between Houshang Chalangi and Babachahi beside an electric-shock warning sign, and shots of Media Kashigar behind an aquarium. The mineral-water bottle that flows along a gutter throughout the film, she writes, becomes a symbol of Babachahi: a traveler without a destination, for whom movement and fluidity matter more than arrival. The bottle acts like an invisible line, holding the narrative together and linking the film's sections. Rahimi also praises the choice of locations; for example, a poem with leftist political themes is recited in the grounds of an abandoned factory. In another sequence, ordinary people—from a fruit seller and a worker to passersby—recite Babachahi's poems.

Nevertheless, Rahimi sees the segment between minutes 60 and 70, devoted to poetry translation, as a break in the film's flow and coherence. In her view, it treats a separate subject that could itself have formed the basis of another documentary. She says the section “saps the film’s momentum,” and that cutting it would have made the film more rhythmically cohesive and concise. Rahimi concludes that incompleteness is the film's dominant form, pointing to the final scene in which Babachahi puts on his coat and, in her words, “sets out for a destination he will never reach.”
