= Ruzi Ruzegari Literary Award =

Iranian prize

The Ruzi Ruzegari Literary Award (Persian: جایزه ادبی روزی‌ روزگاری) is an Iranian literary prize that officially began its activities in 2006 through the organization of joint literary meetings with the literary website Vaales.

This literary award was founded by Media Kashigar and was held for four consecutive editions. During the first three editions, Media Kashigar contemporary translator, researcher, and writer served as the award’s secretary, while Saeed Tabatabaei, writer and literary critic, acted as deputy secretary. In the fourth edition, Saeed Tabatabaei assumed the role of secretary of the award.

The prize was presented annually in five categories: Persian short story, Persian novel, translated fiction, dramatic literature, and book cover design, recognizing the best works published each year.
