= Ali Ashraf Darvishian =

Iranian writer (1941–2017)

- Born: 25 August 1941; Kermanshah, Iran
- Died: 26 October 2017 (aged 76); Karaj, Iran
- Occupation: Writer
- Spouse: Shahnaz Darabian
- Writing career
- Pen name: Latif Talkhestani
- Genres: Novel, short story, biography, etc
- Notable works: Sal-ha-ye Abri (Cloudy Years); Abshouran; Az In Welayat (From This Country); Hamrah-e Ahang-ha-ye Babam (With My Father's Songs); Afsane-ha va Matal-ha-ye Kurdi (Kurdish Legends and Fictions)
- Notable awards: Gelawej Cultural Festival 2013
- Literary movement: Modernism, Realism, Socialism

Ali Ashraf Darvishian (Persian: علی‌اشرف درویشیان; 25 August 1941 – 26 October 2017) was a story writer and scholar of Kurdish descent. After finishing teacher-training college, he would teach at the poverty-stricken villages of Gilan-e-Gharb and Shah Abad (now called Islam Abad). This atmosphere is featured in most of his stories. His own life situation, as well as the experiences that he had from his teaching in those poor areas, was the inspiration for his literary works and also made him a critic of the political and social situation of Iran. Later, he moved to Tehran and continued his studies in Persian literature.

In 2006, Ali Ashraf Darvishian was in Australia as a guest of the Iranian Centre for Democracy and presented a number of lectures on a broad range of social and cultural issues.

Marjane Satrapi, an Iranian-French author, mentions Darvishian in her graphic novel Persepolis. She considers him her favorite childhood author, recalls going to his clandestine book signing, and describes him as "a kind of local Charles Dickens".

Ali Ashraf Darvishian died at Karaj, on 26 October 2017 and was buried at Behesht-e Sakineh cemetery.

== Books ==
- آبشوران : مجموعة قصصية فارسية (Abshooran), 1975 story collection ISBN 978-9-777-51244-2
- Salhay-e-Abri (Cloudy Years), 1997 novel
- Farhang-e-Afsanehay-e Irani (Iranian Legends and Fairy Tales Encyclopedia)
- "Paper Wishes", 2003 short story

One of his books is a collection of short stories titled Az Nadarad Ta Darad. The title includes the main character's surname, "Nadarad", which means "doesn't have", foreshadowing the absolute poverty of all the characters in the story, especially his family. From the point of view of Marxist criticism, poverty can be said to be the result of social conflict and class struggle, because people were not aware of how they have unconsciously accepted the subservient, powerless roles in their society that have been prescribed for them by others (false consciousness). In this story, the Nadarad family represents the proletariat, while Mash Ghorban represents the bourgeoisie. Niaz Ali chooses to go to school to promote his class in society, and he has no plan to protest against the cruel social structure.
