= The Leopards Who Have Run with Me =

1997 short story collection by Bijan Najdi

- Author: Bijan Najdi
- Original title: یوزپلنگانی که با من دویده‌اند
- Cover artist: Ebrahim Haghighi
- Language: Persian
- Publisher: Markaz
- Publication date: 1997
- Publication place: Iran
- Pages: 90
- ISBN: 964-305-010-6

The Leopards Who Have Run with Me (Persian: یوزپلنگانی که با من دویده‌اند, romanized: Yuzpalangâni ke bâ man davide-and) is a Persian-language short story collection written by Iranian author Bijan Najdi. It was published in Iran in 1997.
