= Pouya Bakhtiari =

Iranian protester

- Born: 10 September 1992; Tehran, Iran
- Died: 16 November 2019 (aged 27); Mehrshahr, Karaj, Iran
- Cause of death: Shooting
- Known for: Death during the 2019 Iranian protests
- Parents: Manouchehr Bakhtiari (father); Nahid Shirbisheh (mother)

Pouya Bakhtiari (Persian: پویا بختیاری; 1992–2019) was an Iranian protester who was shot and killed on 16 November 2019 in Karaj during the 2019 Iranian protests. His death and his parents' reaction garnered nationwide attention; the arrest of several of Bakhtiari's family, who had defied a request by authorities to keep the mourning ceremony low-key, drew international condemnation, including in a Tweet from U.S. Secretary of State Mike Pompeo.

== Life ==
Pouya Bakhtiari was born on 10 September 1992 in Tehran, Iran. He received his degree in electrical engineering and operated his family's workshop. Bakhtiari was interested in Iranian history and poetry, and wanted to eventually immigrate to Canada.

== Death and subsequent arrests of family members ==
Bakhtiari's father Manouchehr Bakhtiari, a veteran of the Iran–Iraq War, announced that his son had died on 16 November 2019 in Mehrshahr due to a gunshot wound to the skull. According to him, Bakhtiari was accompanied by his mother, Nahid Shirbisheh, on the second day of the 2019 Iranian protests in Mehrshahr and was pronounced dead before he reached the hospital. Shirbisheh stated that "For a moment I saw that people were carrying the body of a protester, and I realized it was my son".

In an interview with Masih Alinejad, Manouchehr stated he was not afraid of death, that he would not stay silent and that it was the Islamic Republic of Iran who were the "real hooligans".

Bakhtiari's body was buried on 19 November 2019 in Behesht-e Sakineh Cemetery in Karaj.

On 23 December 2019, the government arrested several members of Bakhtiari's family, who had wanted to hold a public memorial service on 26 December. According to Manouchehr, authorities had requested the family to hold the ceremony in a mosque, but he had refused, citing the need for a larger space. U.S. Secretary of State Mike Pompeo condemned the arrests on Twitter. Authorities released Shirbisheh on 7 January 2020 and Manouchehr on 25 January, the latter on bail.

Bakhtiari's father Manouchehr became an ardent pro-monarchy activist after his son's death. He was detained in July 2020 on Kish Island, to where he had gone to campaign against the Iran–China 25-year Cooperation Program. He was transferred to Bandar Abbas prison, according to Bakhtiari's uncle Mehrdad Bakhtiari.

Bakhtiari's uncle Mehrdad was again detained on 31 October 2020, and handed a five-year suspended sentence and prohibited to leave the country for two years upon release on 16 December 2020. Days before his detention, Mehrdad had given interviews to foreign-based Persian news outlets in which he spoke of ongoing pressure by authorities to stop the family from demanding a thorough investigation into Bakhtiari's death; he had told Voice of America that authorities had ascribed the death, and that of others in the protests, to anti-government forces from outside Iran.

== Video ==
On the day of his death, Bakhtiari recorded a series of videos on his mobile phone from protests in Karaj during the day and continuing into the night which were widely circulated after his death.

After the original release of the video by BBC Persian, the entire video was released by Masih Alinejad, which made apparent that the BBC had censored part of the original video. In the censored part of the video, Bakhtiari says "Bravo to everyone! People don't lose this opportunity to once and for all destroy this criminal and corrupt regime which has pillaged our beloved Iran for 40 years."

== See also ==
- 2019 Iranian protests
