= Behesht-e Sakineh =

Cemetery in Tahran, Iran

Coordinates: 35.893056°N 50.8825°E

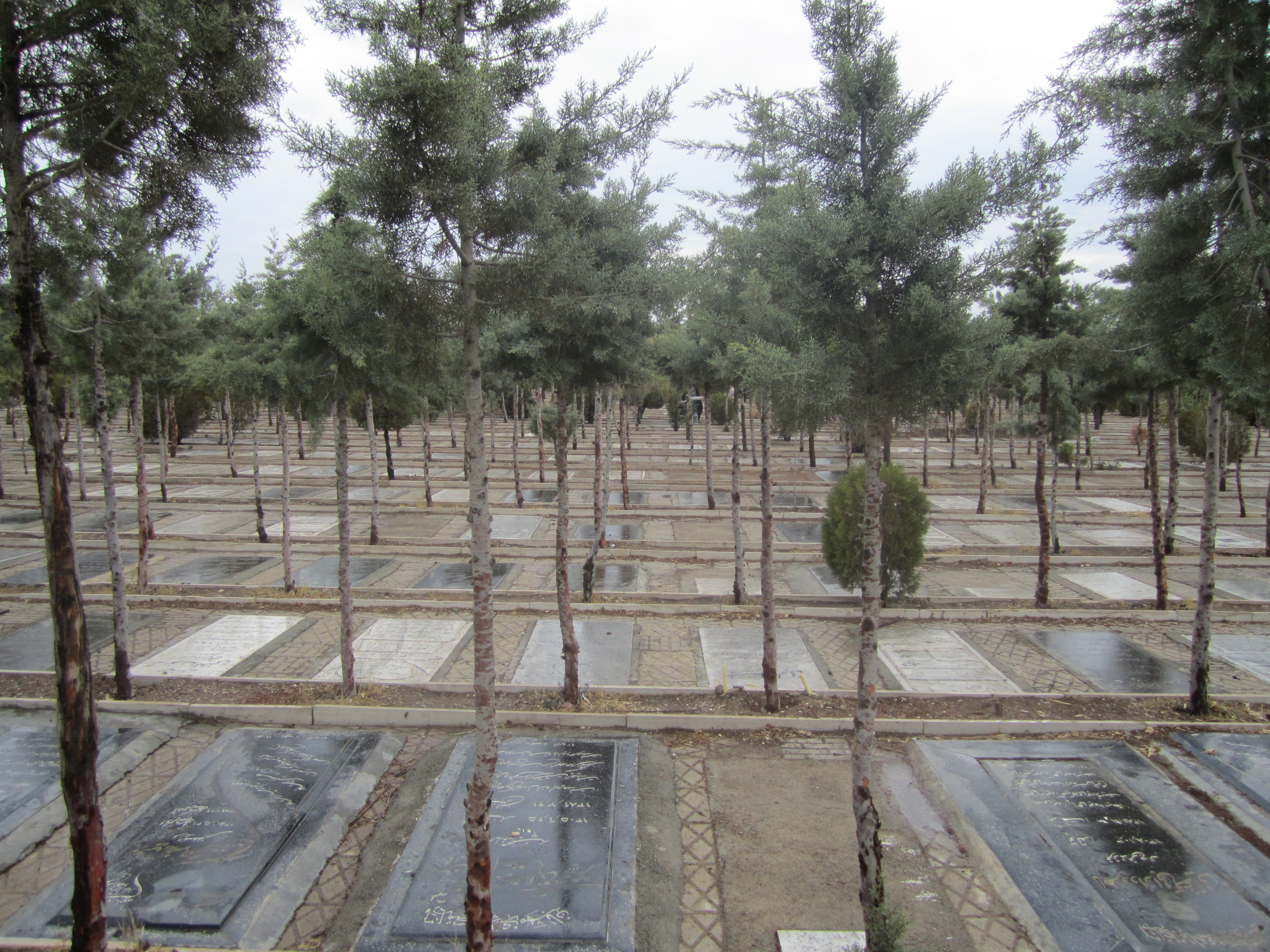

Behesht-e Sakineh (Persian: بهشت سکینه) is a major cemetery located in Iran near the city of Karaj. It was established in 1976.

== Notable burials ==
- Abolfazl Zanjani (fa) (1899–1992) – politician
- Mohammad Zohari (1926–1995) – writer
- Ghlamreza Dadbeh (fa) (1920–2001) – musician
- Mahmoud Etemadzadeh (1915–2006) – writer
- Bahman Safvat (fa) (1940–2006) – journalist
- Amir-Hossein Heshmat-Saran (1960–2009) – political activist
- Shahram Farajzadeh (fa) (1974–2009) – protester
- Shapour Yasemi (fa) (1922–2011) – film director
- Massoumeh Seyhoun (1934–2010) – painter
- Mohsen Pezeshkpour (1928–2011) – leader of Pan-Iranist Party
- Sahereh Matin (fa) (1935–2011) – actress
- Fahimeh Rastkar (1934–2012) – actress
- Iraj Ghaderi (1934–2012) – actor
- Behrouz Servatian (1937–2012) – scholar
- Asghar Elahi (fa) (1944–2012) – writer
- Dariush Safvat (1928–2013) – musician
- Mohsen Amiraslani (1977–2014) – psychoanalyst
- Rahim Moeini Kermanshahi (1923–2015) – poet
- Abolhassan Jalili (fa) (1926–2015) – scholar
- Akbar Vares (fa) (1945–2015) – actor
- Beitollah Abbaspour (fa) (1980–2015) – athletic
- Bahman Zarrinpour (fa) (1941–2016) – actor
- Cyrus Qahramani (fa) (1938–2017) – actor
- Ali-Ashraf Darvishian (1941–2017) – scholar
- Sima Hajikhani (Negar) (fa) (1955–2018) – actress
- Nasser Rezaei (fa) (1983–2019) – protester
- Amir-Hossein Kabiri (fa) (1987–2019) – protester
- Vahid Damvar (fa) (1989–2019) – protester
- Ebrahim Ketabdar (fa) (1990–2019) – protester
- Pouya Bakhtiari (1992–2019) – protester
- Meysam Ahmadi (fa) (1992–2019) – protester
- Azadeh Zarbi (fa) (1993–2019) – protester
- Najaf Daryabandari (1929–2020) – writer
- Nader Mokhtari (fa) (1985–2020) – protester
- Ebrahim Qanbari-Mehr (1928–2022) – musician
- Rafat Hashempour (1931–2022) – voice actress
- Manouchehr Esmaeili (1939–2022) – voice actor
- Siavash Shakeri (fa) (1939–2022) – film director
- Karim Bavi (1964–2022) – football player
- Hadis Najafi (2000–2022) – protester
- Parsa Rezadoust (fa) (2003–2022) – protester
- Nima Nuri (fa) (2004–2022) – protester
- Sarina Esmailzadeh (2006–2022) – protester
- Morteza Poursamadi (1952–2023) – cinematographer
- Hossein Shahabi (1967–2023) – film director
- Sepideh Farhan (fa) (1991–2023) – political activist
- Bahareh Lellahi (fa) (1984–2024) – film director
- Cysrus Parham (fa) (1929–2025) – art critic
- Homayoun Ershadi (1947–2025) – actor
- Ali Babachahi (1942–2026) – writer
