= Esmail Shahroudi =

Iranian poet (1926–1981)

- اسماعیل شاهرودی
- Born: Mohammad Esmail Shahroudi; 30 January 1926; Damghan, Iran
- Died: 25 November 1981 (aged 55); Tehran, Iran
- Education: University of Tehran
- Occupations: Poet, teacher, cultural researcher
- Writing career
- Pen name: Ayandeh; Shurideh
- Language: Persian
- Movement: Nimaic poetry

Mohammad Esmail Shahroudi (Persian: اسماعیل شاهرودی; 30 January 1926 – 25 November 1981), commonly known as Esmail Shahroudi, was an Iranian poet, teacher and cultural researcher. Writing principally under the pen name Ayandeh (Persian: آینده; meaning “future”), he was among the earliest poets to follow Nima Yushij and adopt the forms and principles of modern Nimaic poetry.

Shahroudi's poetry combined social and political concerns with colloquial language, symbolic imagery and experiments in poetic form. Literary scholars have described his early poetry as closely associated with the discourse of literary commitment and his later work as increasingly experimental in its treatment of language, typography, sound and visual form.

== Early life and education ==
Shahroudi was born on 30 January 1926 in Damghan, in Semnan province, Iran. He completed his primary education in Damghan and later attended a teacher-training school in Shahrud. In 1944, he moved to Tehran in search of employment and further education.

While working in Tehran, he was employed in various capacities by newspapers. Accounts of his early career state that he met Nima Yushij through this work. Shahroudi had previously composed poetry in traditional forms under the pen name Shurideh (Persian: شوریده), but after becoming acquainted with Nima and modern poetry he adopted the name Ayandeh.

He studied painting at the Faculty of Fine Arts of the University of Tehran and also pursued courses in journalism and theatre. He subsequently worked for the Ministry of Education, first as a primary-school teacher and later as a secondary-school teacher.

== Political activity and imprisonment ==
From the second half of the 1940s, Shahroudi was associated with the Tudeh Party of Iran. His early political and social poetry addressed the lives of workers, opposition to authoritarianism, hopes for social change and the promotion of peace.

An article in the newspaper Etemad states that he was arrested and tortured in 1956, while other biographical accounts date an arrest to 1965. Later writers frequently connected his imprisonment with a serious deterioration in his mental health. Afshin Shahroudi, who edited the poet's collected works, nevertheless cautioned that many accounts of Shahroudi's illness had been repeatedly copied, embellished or presented without sufficient documentation.

Shahroudi experienced recurring mental illness during the later decades of his life and was hospitalised on several occasions. His illness increasingly limited his literary and professional activity during the 1970s.

== Academic and cultural work ==
After completing his studies, Shahroudi collaborated with Mohammad Moin on the compilation of artistic terminology for the Moin Encyclopedic Dictionary and also worked with the Dehkhoda Dictionary Institute.

In 1963, he travelled to India to teach modern Persian literature at Aligarh Muslim University. He later returned to Iran and, in 1969, became a cultural specialist at the Iranian National Commission for UNESCO. At the same time, he taught a course on the relationship between literature and the visual arts at the Faculty of Fine Arts of the University of Tehran. He retired in 1975.

Shahroudi died on 25 November 1981 at Dariush Kabir Hospital, now known as Shariati Hospital, in Tehran.

== Poetry ==
Shahroudi's first collection, Akharin Nabard (lit. The Last Fight), was published in 1951. Nima Yushij wrote an extensive introduction to the volume, an unusual distinction among the first generation of Nimaic poets. Scholars have argued that Nima was particularly interested in Shahroudi's attention to ordinary people's lives and his incorporation of colloquial and argot vocabulary into poetry.

His early collections show a strong formal and linguistic debt to Nima and are marked by social commitment and left-wing political themes. They frequently depict working-class life, poverty, repression and the expectation of political transformation. Shahroudi also made extensive use of natural, historical, religious and political symbols to address subjects that could not easily be expressed directly under conditions of censorship and political repression.

In his later books, particularly M o Mey dar Sa, Har Su-ye Rah, Rah, Rah, Rah and Ay Miqat-neshin, Shahroudi developed a more individual poetic language. These works combined colloquial speech with elements of classical Persian literary language and explored the visual disposition of words, repetitions, fragmented syntax and the relationships between verbal, musical and pictorial forms.

Although Shahroudi was widely read during parts of the 1950s and 1960s, his work received comparatively little attention after his death. Later critics and poets have argued that his formal and linguistic experiments anticipated tendencies that became more prominent in Persian poetry during subsequent decades.

== Legacy ==
Reza Baraheni wrote the long poem Esmail in memory of Shahroudi. The poem addresses both the dead poet and the Qur'anic and Biblical figure of Ishmael, while also incorporating references to sacrifice and the Iran–Iraq War.

Baraheni's poem helped preserve Shahroudi's public memory and contributed to the later critical reassessment of his life and work.

== Bibliography ==
=== Poetry collections ===
- Akharin Nabard (The Last Fight), 1951 (1330 SH)
- Ayandeh (The Future), 1967 (1346 SH)
- Bargozideh-ye She'rha-ye Esmail Shahroudi (Selected Poems of Esmail Shahroudi), 1969 (1348 SH)
- M o Mey dar Sa, 1970 (1349 SH)
- Har Su-ye Rah, Rah, Rah, Rah..., 1971 (1350 SH)
- Ay Miqat-neshin, 1972 (1351 SH)

=== Short stories ===
- Chand Kilometr va Nimi az Vaqe'iyat (Several Kilometres and Half of Reality), 1970 (1349 SH)

=== Posthumous collections and studies ===
- Viran Sorayidan: Gozineh-ye She'rha-ye Esmail Shahroudi, Cheshmeh Publishing
- Majmu'eh-ye Ash'ar-e Esmail Shahroudi, edited by Afshin Shahroudi, Negah Publishing, 2011
- Ali Babachahi, Zibātari az Jonun: Zendegi va She'r-e Esmail Shahroudi, Sales Publishing, ISBN 9789643803544
