= Writers' Association of Iran =

1968 group promoting freedom of speech

The Writers' Association of Iran (Persian: کانون نویسندگان ایران) is an organization founded in 1968 by forty-nine notable Persian writers with the objective of promoting freedom of speech and fighting against censorship. These writers included Jalal Al-Ahmad, Bahram Bayzai, Darioush Ashouri, Mohammad, and Mohammad Sepanlou. It is one of the oldest and most influential trade union for Iranian writers. It has been an opposition union (vis-a-vis the government) since its establishment. The Iranian Writers' Association (IWA) was banned in 1981 by the Iranian authorities.

In 1978, shortly before the revolution of 1979, the group hosted a large literary even that was essential in generating an atmosphere of dissent and political enthusiasm.

Thirty writers formed a "consulting assembly" in 1993 to resurrect the banned IWA. On September 8, 1996, 12 writers were blindfolded and transported to Evin Prison in Tehran after meeting at the home of Mansour Koshan, editor of the banned journal Takapoo, to prepare a new charter for the IWA. Hossein Asghari, Mohammad Baharloo, Reza Baraheni, Roshnak Daryoush, Kaveh Goharin, Hushang Golshiri, Ghafar Hosseini, Kamran Jamali, Mohammad Mokhtari, Mohammad Mohammad-Ali, Faraj Sarkuhi, and Farzaneh Taheri were among the writers who were jailed. After being interrogated, the writers were freed the same day and told not to arrange any more meetings for the promotion of the IWA.

Since then, IWA members and board members have faced systematic prosecution, long prison sentences, and even targeted killings, such as the disappearance and subsequent discovery of some Iranian dissident intellectuals' bodies who were critical of the Islamic Republic between 1988 and 1998.

Ghafar Hosseini, one of the 134 signatories to a 1994 proclamation advocating for the abolition of literary censorship, was discovered dead in his residence on November 11, 1996 (Index on Censorship Jan). Although Hosseini's death was attributed to heart failure by the authorities, his colleagues said that he had never had any heart problems before. Ebrahim Zalzadeh, former editor of the monthly literary journal Me'yar and owner of Ebtekar, was reported missing in February 1997, and his death was discovered in a Tehran morgue in March 1997. According to reports, the Iranian authorities had failed to undertake "a thorough inquiry" into his death as of September 1997.

Others, like novelist Ali Akbar Saeedi Sijani, were assassinated in detention just for writing letters to Supreme Leader Ayatollah Ali Khamenei informing him of human rights violations in the country. During that decade, the murders were part of a state-sponsored organized crime campaign that mostly targeted intellectuals and political activists. Iran's reformist President Mohammad Khatami and the vocal reformist press that was allowed to function in Iran during his period of office in the late 1990s and early 2000s later revealed the murders. Several of its members have suffered organized persecution, and a few have been murdered mysteriously. Simin Daneshvar was the founding chief of the association. Mohammad-Ali Sepanlou, himself a founding member, has a history of the association, published in 2002 in Stockholm.

In 2018 May 25, the 50th anniversary of the founding of the Iranian Writers Association was thwarted by Iranian security forces. Security forces "brutally invaded" the venue of the writers' gathering at a member's house and sealed the street where it was located, according to Akbar Massoumbeigi, a member of the Writers Association. Security agents also seized all of the posters and souvenirs that members had prepared for the ceremony during the previous year, according to the article.

The Association continues to work for the country's right to freedom of expression and against censorship.

== See also ==
- The assassination attempt on the Iranian writers' bus
