= Persian Speculative Art and Literature Award =

Annual literary award

The Persian Speculative Art and Literature Award was an annual literary award in the field of speculative fiction in the Persian language.

== History ==
Established in 2004, it was the only non-governmental literary award in Iran. It was discontinued in 2014.

== Persian Speculative Short Story Contest ==
This prize is awarded to the best short story of the year in the fields of science fiction, horror fiction, or fantasy. All entries must be in Persian, but the authors may be of any nationality.

== Award categories ==
- Best sf&f short story, selected by a jury of the Persian Speculative Fiction Short Story Contest
- Best sf&f translator of the year
- Best sf&f publisher of the year
- Most active person in sf&f literature of the year
