= Shahrzad Sepanlou =

Persian American singer (born 1974)

Shahrzad Sepanlou شهرزاد سپانلو
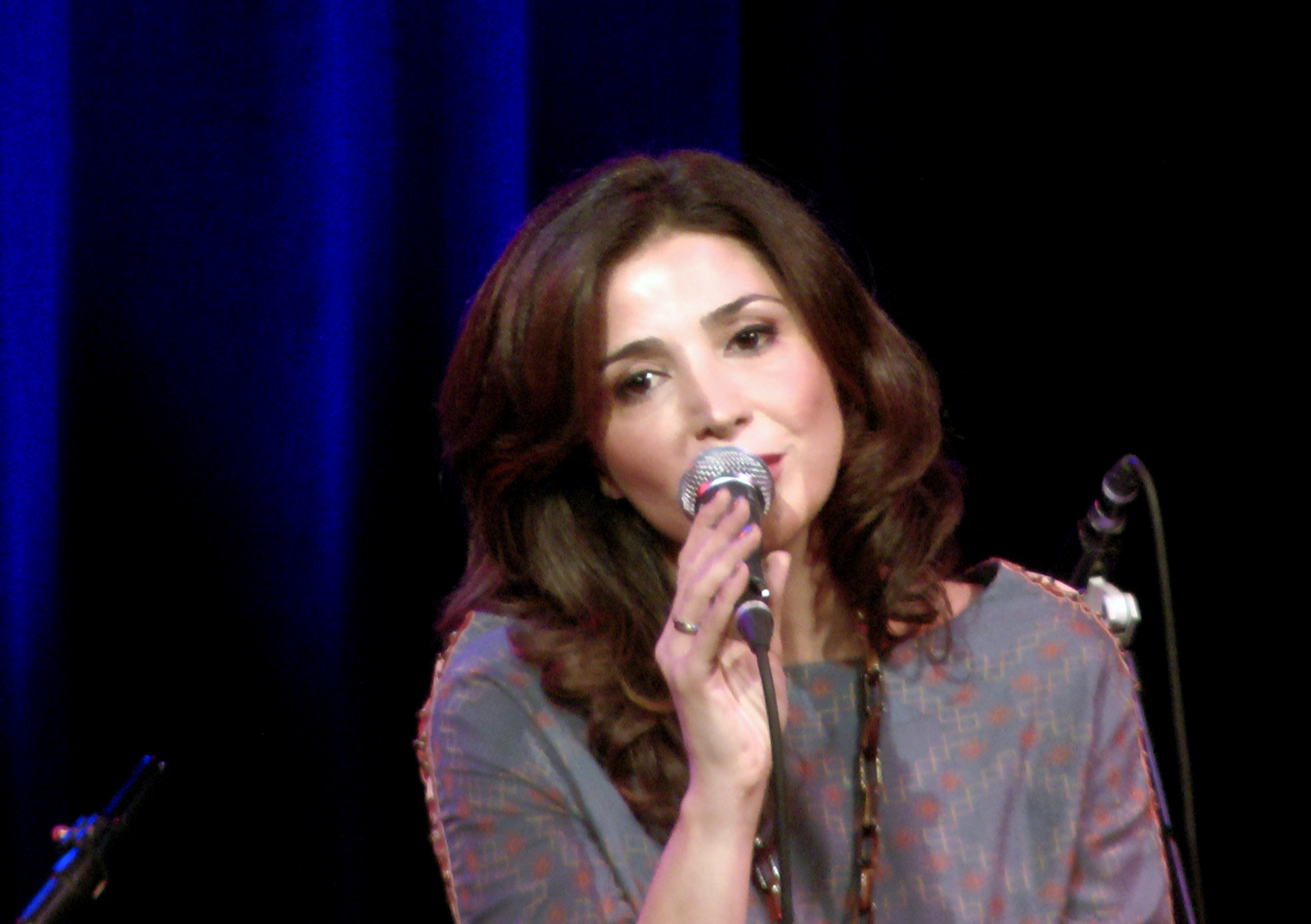
- Shahrzad Sepanlou, Amsterdam, 2013

Background information
- Born: November 6, 1972 (age 53); Tehran, Iran
- Origin: Los Angeles, California, United States
- Genres: Persian pop music
- Occupation: Singer
- Instrument: Vocals
- Years active: 1997–present
- Label: Independent
- Website: shahrzadmusic.com

Shahrzad Sepanlou (Persian: شهرزاد سپانلو) is a Persian American singer. She was born in Tehran and migrated to the United States in the mid-1980s. Sepanlou is currently a marriage and family therapist in Orange County, CA.

Sepanlou is the daughter of Mohammad-Ali Sepanlou and Partow Nooriala.

Like so many of her generation, Shahrzad experienced revolution, war, and repression, and her music often reflects these experiences.

== Discography ==
Sepanlou has recorded 6 albums.

1. Water, Fire, and Earth (in the band, Silhouettt)
2. Our Story
3. 1001 Nights
4. TŌ (You)
5. One Day
6. A brief pause
