= Mahmoud Mosharraf Azad Tehrani =

Iranian poet (1934–2006)

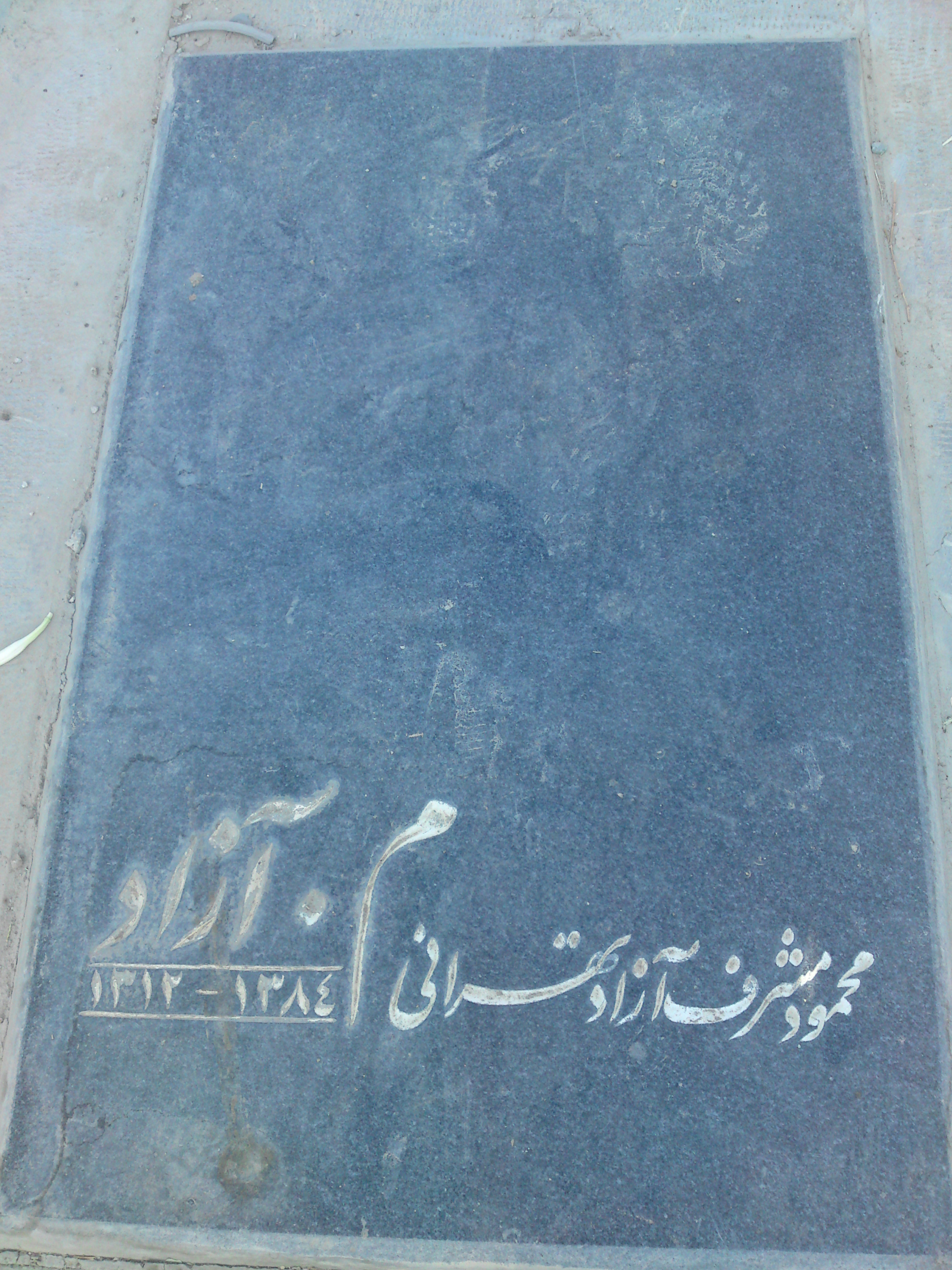
Tomb of M. Azad

Mahmoud Moshref Azad Tehrani (Persian: محمود مشرف آزاد تهرانی; December 9, 1934 in Tehran – January 19, 2006 in Tehran) was a contemporary Persian poet with M. Azad (م. آزاد) as his pen-name. Some of his poems have been sung by several Iranian singers.

== Poem collections ==
M. Azad has four collections of poems: Diar-e Shab (The land of night), Aaineh ha Tohist (The mirrors are empty), Ghasideh-ye Boland-e Baad, (The long ode of wind) and, Ba Man Toloo Kon (Rise with me) and a collection of poems, with the title of Gole Baaghe Aashnaai, published in year 2000, comprising 482 pieces from above books and 108 new pieces.

== Other works ==
In addition to poet cycles, he wrote about 50 books for sub-teens and teenagers. Following is a list of some of M. Azad publications:

- Carl Sandburg, poems (in collaboration with Ahmad Karimi-Hakkak)
- Bob Dylan, songs, translation from English (in collaboration with Saeed Parsian)
- Joan Baez, songs, translation from English (in collaboration with Mani Salehi)
- Bob Marley, songs, translation from English (in collaboration with Saeed Parsian)
- Life with Picasso, Françoise Jilot, translated by Alireza Geran-Nazar, edited by M. Azad
- Parishadokht-e She’r (The Princess of Poetry), life and poems of Forough Farrokhzad
- The Tree of Life, a collection of Rumi's poems, re-written in plain Persian for young Iranians
- Afsaneh-ye Shahan va Pahlevanan, (The myth of kings and heroes). (The whole series of Afsaneh-ye Shahan va Pahlavanan were completed by Moshref Azad before his life ended. The first volume was published when Azad was alive and the rest of the series to be published in near future.)

Many of his poems are used in Persian literature books for schools in Iran.
