= Yadollah Royaee =

Iranian poet (1932–2022)

- یدالله رویایی
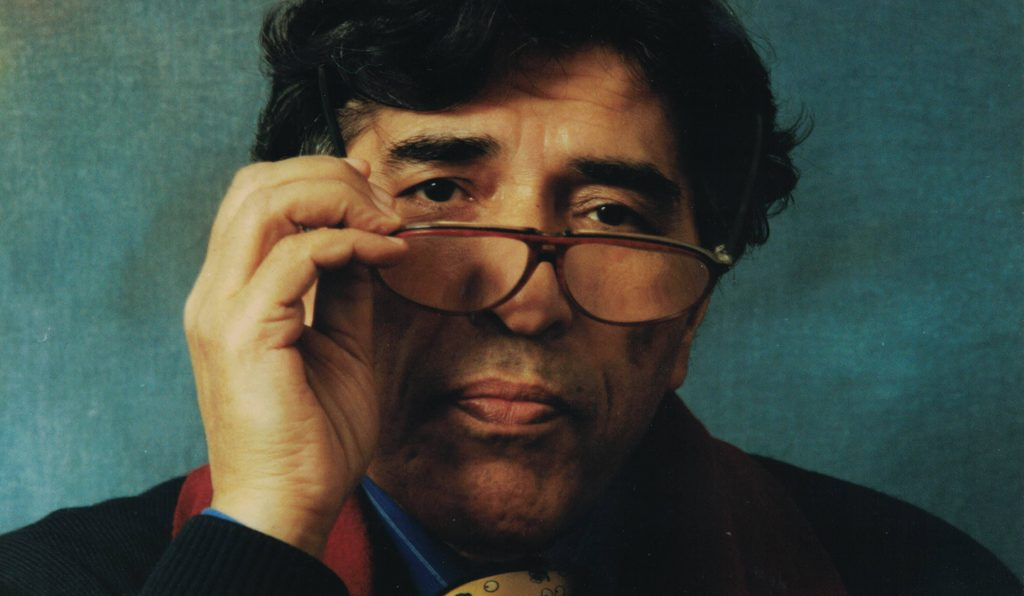
- Born: 7 May 1932; Damghan, Iran
- Died: 12 September 2022 (aged 90); Paris, France
- Other name: Roya (Persian: رویا)

Yadollah Royaee (7 May 1932 – 12 September 2022; Persian: یدالله رؤیایی) was an Iranian poet of the New Wave or the Poem of Imagination in Iranian Modern Literature.

== Life and career ==
Royale was born in Damghan, Semnan province, Iran on 7 May 1932. He was a graduate of the college of law and human sciences and he had worked for the state television for several years. His poetry renewed debate about the relative value of form and context in modern Persian poetry. Yadollah was careful to produce unity in his poems. His sea songs reflect French symbolism. He moved to exotic marine landscapes and creates glorious lyrical images, focusing mostly on symbols rather than metaphors in image building. His lyrics are deeply imbued with Persian mysticism. Royaee invented and introduced a style in Persian poetry that he named Espacementalisme. His work "Le Passé en je signature" was translated into French in 2002. He died in Paris, France on 12 September 2022, at the age of 90.

== Works ==
- On Empty Roads
- Sea Songs
- The Loneliness
- Of I love you
- Overflowing
- Seventy Gravestones
- The Past me: Signature
