= Bijan Najdi =

Iranian writer and poet (1941–1997)

- بیژن نجدی
- Born: 15 November 1941; Khash, Pahlavi Iran
- Died: 25 August 1997 (aged 55); Lahijan, Iran
- Occupations: Poet, writer
- Spouse: Parvaneh Mohseni Azad
- Children: Nathanael, Yuhanna
- Writing career
- Notable work: The Leopards Who Have Run with Me

Bijan Najdi (Persian: بیژن نجدی, pronounced [biːˈʒæn nædʒˈdiː]; 15 November 1941 – 25 August 1997) was an Iranian writer and poet. Najdi is most famous for his 1994 short story collection The Leopards Who Have Run with me.

== Biography ==
Bijan Najdi was born in Khash, a county in Sistan and Baluchestan province, Iran. His parents were from Gilan. When he was four, he lost his father in a murder incident. He got his basic education in Rasht. He got his M.A in Mathematics and was one of the first writers to go to the front in Iran-Iraq war. He started writing when he was young, and published his notable book "The leopards who have run with me" in 1994, three years before his death. This book received a Gardoun award as one of the best short story collections ever written in Iran.

== Style ==
Najdi uses Persian literature's figures of speech to make his style unique. Considering Najdi's works through linguistic point of view, in some of his stories what we have is actually poetry. Language is a base for Praise and poetry and it is the language that forms a poem for its poet and a story for its writer.

Language in Najdi's work is more poetic rather than a social reality. Each language consists of linguistic elements which are regularly put together. Combination of phonemes forms words and words make sentences or phrases. But this is not the only feature of linguistic elements; they can replace each other. Combination and replacement of linguistic elements, forms metonymy. Metaphor is one of these functions which is extensively used in literary works.

=== Examples from Leopards ===
- "The white winter, walks its white cold beyond the window. (L.E, p9)
- "Don’t look at telephone's voice." (personification of verb, The pool, p 10)
- "He could smell the tee gardens through his coat's collar." (The pool, p 11)
- "It was cold and tasted like the rain." (The pool, p 20)
- "The day has undressed himself and touched the horse with his coldness" (The day, p21)
- "No village was coming from the distance." (The day, p25)
- "Asieh was leaning against a wall of rain." (The day, p21)
- "The mosque's tower had grown its green height to the sky and touched the clouds with Azan." (The eye)
- Pour her mouths smell on me (The eye)
- "Every now and then I could see one of the Saturdays which was walking out of an alley and slid into another." (The eye)
- "The darkness which was poured." (The eye, p47)
- "The Asphalt was dragging himself on the ground and bent over his length on the grass." (the eye, p48)
- "The elevator's door was opened with a cry." (me, p55)
- "His big head, with a wide forehead in the middle." (me, p58)
- "Now it sounded like a horse gallop on ice or glass." (me, P58)
- "The naked feet pass through the veins in his brain and touch the back of his forehead in search of a window and they grow old at a slow pace." (me, p60)
- "He poured his face on the pillow like water." (Memories, p66)
- "I could hear a cradle's cry from behind." (Memories, p60)
- "A couple of sour cherry branches and a piece of sky were portrayed on the frozen pool." (Memories, p61)
- "From the clothes hanging in yard, Taher could be smelled." (Memories, p60)
- "Smoke climbs the sour cherry tree." (Memories, p 61)
- "The umbrella could not hear its springs compressing. He was dying and could not remember any rain." (Three, p73)
- "Only a far memory, a bit warmer than Maliheh's hand, was still in the umbrella." (Three, p71)
- "A long blue was pouring out of her fingers." (Three, p 75)
- "He could hear Tehran breathing." (Three, p71)
- "Ferdosi still couldn’t stretch himself out on his long bones." (The night, p40)
- "Breaks were hugging each other." (The night, P40)
- "The scent of tee was compressed in the corner." (The night, P45)

== Works ==
Among Najdi's works are poems and short stories. He published The Leopards Who Have Run with Me while alive; his other works were published posthumously by his wife.

- The Leopards Who Have Run with Me – 1994
- Repeated Stories
- Once Again the Same Streets – 2001
- Unfinished Stories – 2002
- The Sisters of This Summer

== Legacy ==
Sepideh Farsi made a film based on four of his short stories.
