= Media Kashigar =

Iranian writer, translator, and poet

Media Kashigar مدیا کاشیگر
- Born: May 1, 1956; Iran
- Died: 29 July 2017 (aged 61); Tehran
- Occupations: Writer, translator, poet

Media Kashigar (Persian: مدیا کاشیگر) (May 1, 1956 – July 29, 2017) was a writer, translator, and poet. More than 20 books of Kashigar have been published in Iran. He was also active for the literary awards in Iran. He was a cultural activist. He was present during the visit of Laurent Fabius in Tehran in 2015.

== Biography ==
Media Kashigar was born in 1956 in Tehran, Iran. He did his studies in the primary and secondary schools in France. Then, he returned to Iran and did his academic studies in architecture and economics there.

== Memberships ==
Media Kashigar was a member of the association of Mahmoud Ostad Mahmoud for the contribution of awards in theater. He was also one of the translators of the Embassy of France in Tehran.

== Books ==
Kashigar translated the literary works of several poets and writers.

- Translation of Vladimir Mayakovsky's poems
- Translation of Fernando Arrabal's poems
- Translation of Eugène Ionesco's poems
- Vaghti Mina az khab bidar shod (novel)
- Khaterehi faramoosh shoded az farda (short stories), 2016
- Marge mourianieh
- Otaghe tarik

== Articles ==
Media Kashigar wrote several articles in order to improve the cultural activities between Iran and France. His articles were published in his book entitled Marge mourianieh in Iran.

== Republication of works ==
Media Kashigar's works were republished by Iranian organizations and centers. Some of his republished works are as follows:

- Media Kashigar's work republished by Tebyan Cultural Institute
- Media Kashigar's work republished by Center for the Great Islamic Encyclopedia

== Outlooks ==
Some of the outlooks of Media Kashigar are as follows:

- The best critic of a translation is its second translation and nothing else. The person who translates a text should have something to say about that.
- The translator translates a book for the ones who are not familiar with its language of origin. If someone can read it in the language of origin, he will not need to read its translation. So, when you translate, you first suppose that you translate it for someone who does not know its language and could not explore that world and that thought.
- The science fiction stories are not for the promotion of science and are not only science stories; but stories.

== See also ==
- Persian Speculative Art and Literature Award
- Speculative Fiction Group
- Granaz Moussavi
