= Mohammad-Ali Sepanlou =

Iranian poet, author and critic

- محمدعلی سپانلو
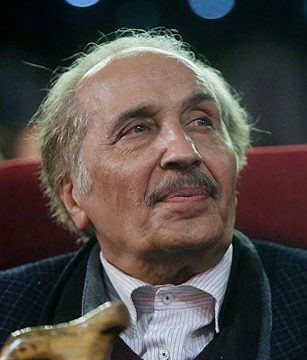
- Born: November 20, 1940; Tehran, Imperial State of Iran
- Died: May 11, 2015 (aged 74); Tehran, Iran
- Occupations: Poet, author, literary critic
- Spouse: Partow Nouri'ala
- Children: 2, including Shahrzad

Mohammad-Ali Sepanlou (Persian: محمدعلی سپانلو; November 20, 1940 – May 11, 2015) was an Iranian poet, author, and literary critic. Born in Tehran, Iran. He has been a founder member, a member of the executive board, and editor of the journal of the Writers’ Association of Iran, in which capacity has opposed both the former regime of Shah Mohammad Reza Pahlavi and the Islamic Republic of Iran, speaking out against censorship.

Sepanlou received his diploma from Dar ul-Funun high school. He graduated from University of Tehran Faculty of Law in 1963. Throughout his literary career, Sepanlou published over 60 books. His works have been translated into English, French, German, Swedish, Dutch, and Arabic. Sepanlou also translated works of several renowned writers and poets, Jean-Paul Sartre and Albert Camus as well as Horace McCoy, Yiannis Ritsos, Arthur Rimbaud, and Guillaume Apollinaire into Persian. He took part in many literary seminars and conferences around the world, introducing Iranian culture and literature to writers, critics, and book-enthusiasts in other countries. His book "Pioneer Writers of Iran", which is a selection of literary works of 20th Century Iranian writers, along with his review of their works, is among the educational literary sources which are being taught in many universities in Iran. He also tried his hand at acting and appeared in films by Amir Qavidel, Nasser Taghva’ee and Ali Hatami. Sepanlou, with his poetry collections, not only wrote historical material about Teheran, but also created masterful poetry. Sepanlou was always a vocal supporter of freedom of speech and press freedom – he was very active on freedom of speech in particular. Sepanlou was definitely one of the people subject to censorship and one of those who suffered because of it. Some of his works were either not printed at all, or if they were, only in strictly censored form. But he never really gave up. Some of his works were printed abroad to evade censorship. However, there are also a few works that Sepanlou wrote, but that haven't been published to this day. In one of his latest interview, he complained about the situation and said he was considering giving up writing entirely. He was married to Partow Nouriala. He died in Tehran in 2015.

== Awards ==
Sepanlou was awarded the French Legion of Honour and the Max Jakob Memorial Award for his scholarly and literary achievements.
