= Mansour Koushan =

Iranian writer and director (1848–2014)

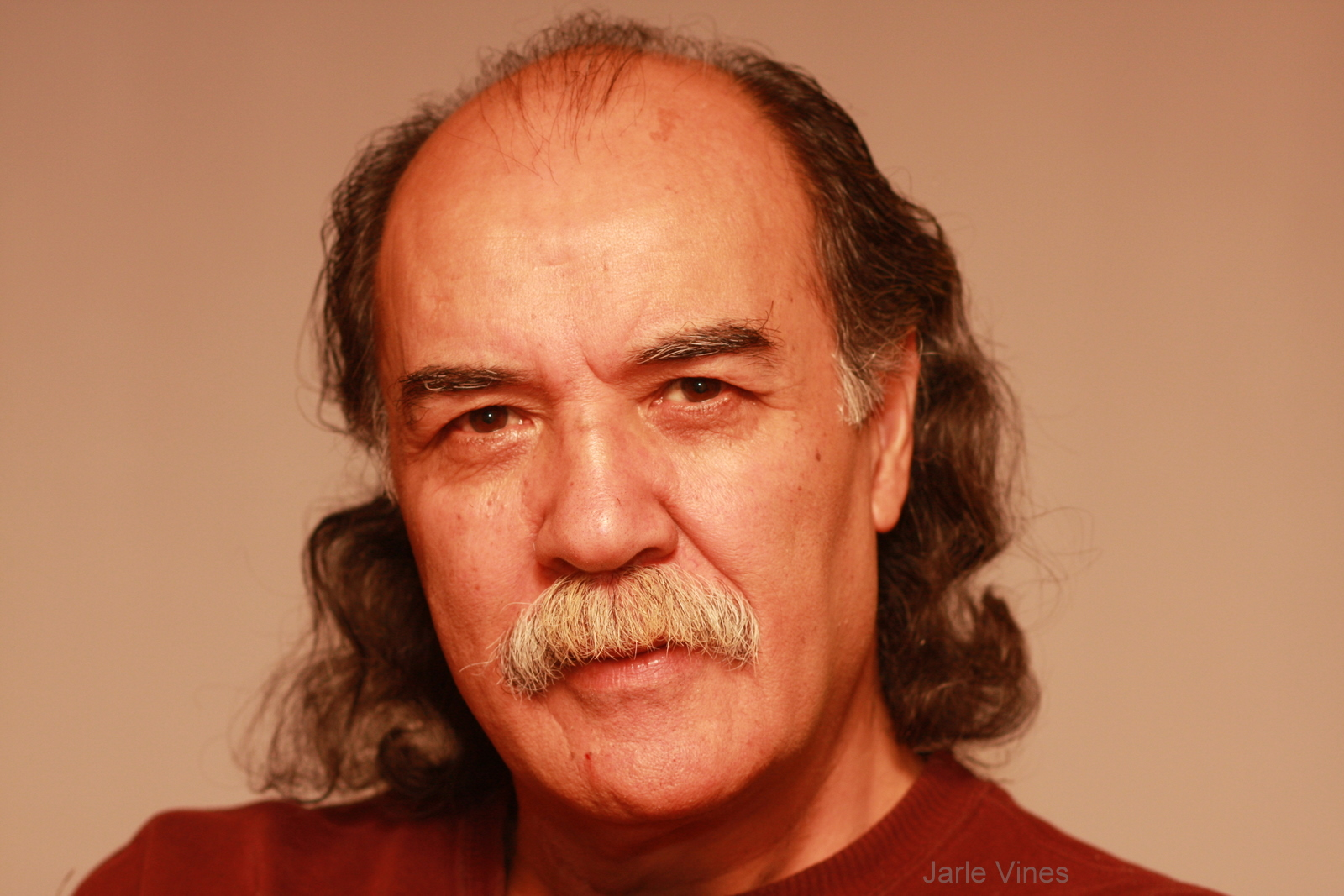
- Born: 26 December 1948; Esfahan, Iran
- Died: 16 February 2014 (aged 65); Stavanger, Norway
- Other names: Arash Arami, Bardia Esfahani, Rousanam Nashouk, Taraneh Nakisa
- Occupations: Novelist, Poet, Playwright, Editor, Director
- Awards: Ossietzky Award ( 2010)

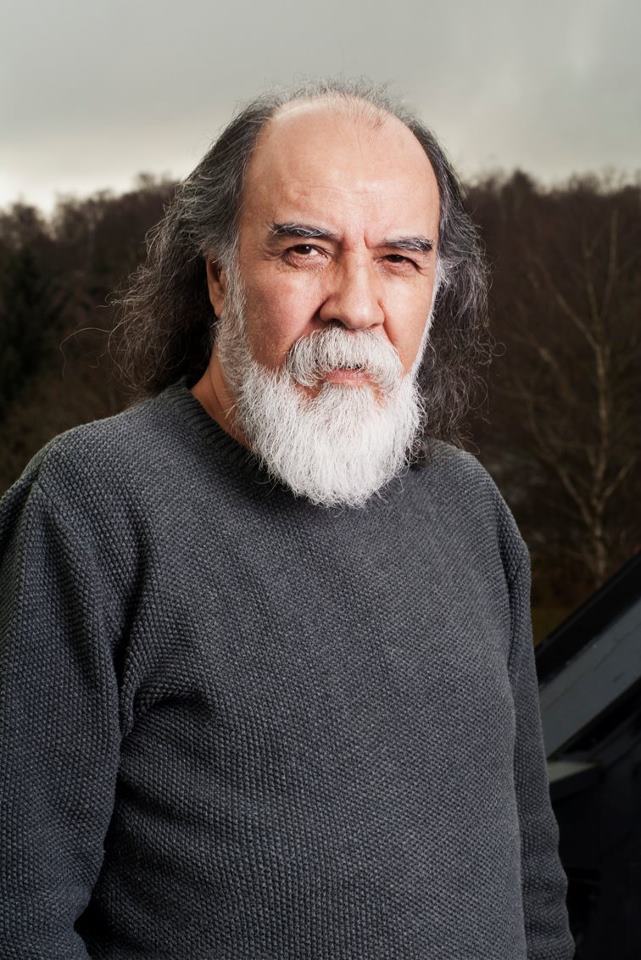
Mansour Koushan

Mansour Koushan (Persian: منصور کوشان) (26 December 1948 Isfahan, Iran – 16 February 2014 Stavanger, Norway) was a prominent Iranian novelist, poet, playwright, editor and director. He received the Ossietzky Award in 2010 for his outstanding work for human rights and freedom of expression. He was an active member of Iranian Writers’ Association and a strong opponent to the Iranian regime. In December 1998 Koushan was invited by the Norwegian Forum for Freedom of Expression to deliver a speech at the 50th anniversary of the U.N. Declaration of Human Rights Charter. Not long after, he received news that two of his friends and colleagues Mohammad Mokhtari and Mohammad-Ja'far Pouyandeh had been abducted and killed in Tehran. His name was said to be on the regime's death list. These killings were part of what is known as Chain Murders of Iran. Koushan was then forced to live in exile and resided in Norway the rest of his life.

In Iran Koushan was the editor of independent literary periodicals Iran, Donyaye Sokhan, Takapou and Adineh. Takapou was shut down in 1996 for being the sole outlet to publish the "1994 Declaration of 134 Iranian Writers," a letter against censorship that would result in the deaths of many of its signatories at the hands of the Iranian regime's secret service.

In Norway he was the artistic manager and director of Teater Sølvberg and staged many plays by international artists. In recent years he was the editor of Jonge Zaman literary quarterly. Koushan was awarded a literary prize in Iran for his theoretical analysis of Norwegian playwright Henrik Ibsen's work. He has published more than 40 titles of poetry, short stories, novels, analysis and plays, as well as hundreds of analytical essays on culture, literature, society and politics. He died of Gastric Cancer on 16 February 2014 at the age of 65.
