= Masoud Behnoud =

Iranian journalist (born 1946)

- مسعود بهنود
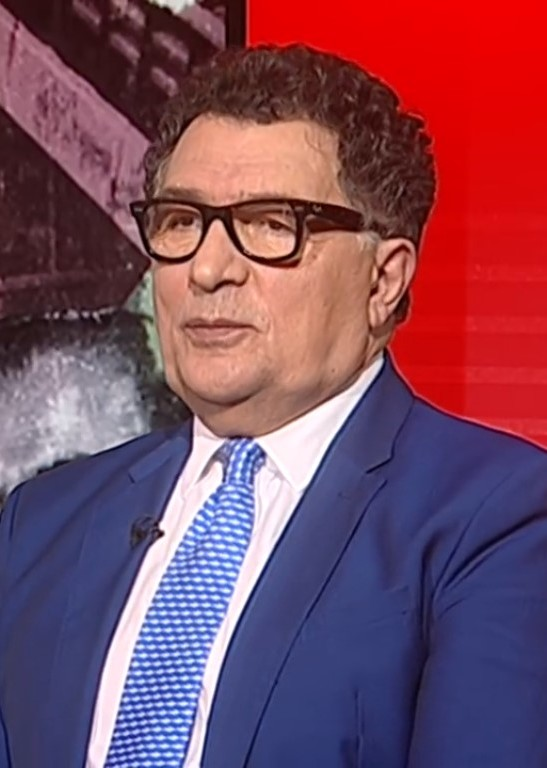
- Masoud Behnoud on BBC Persian, 2019
- Born: 19 August 1946 (age 79); Tehran, Iran
- Occupations: Journalist, historian
- Years active: 1964–present
- Children: Nima Behnoud; Bamdad Behnoud

Masoud Behnoud (Persian: مسعود بهنود; born 19 August 1946 in Tehran) is an Iranian journalist, He began his career as a journalist in 1964. Since then he has worked as an investigating journalist for different newspapers.

Behnoud lives in the United Kingdom and works as a journalist for a number of media organisations, mainly BBC Persian Service, for which he has worked for the past fourteen years. His debut in the West was the launch of ‘Khanoum’, by Pegasus Elliott McKenzie in November 2008.

== Biography ==
Behnoud started his career as a journalist in 1964 and was active in the trade union of the Iranian journalists. During his career Behnoud produced and presented programmes for the National Iranian Radio and Television, and he founded a number of newspapers and magazines many of which were banned with the advent of 1979 Islamic revolution of Iran, with the editor and senior members of staff being arrested. An attempt to publish other newspapers later on was met with public interest though they were all closed Between 1971 and 1979 he was the chief editor of the daily Ayandegan which was closed in 1979 on the orders of Ayatollah Khomeini, and its editor and senior staff were all imprisoned. During 1972–79 he also worked as a producer, writer and speaker for the National Iranian Radio and Television. In 1979 Massoud Behnoud became the chief editor of the weekly Tehran Mosavar, which was shut down by the Islamic government after 30 issues during the crackdown of all non-governmental and independent newspapers.

== Crackdown of the journalists ==
From 1979 till 1985, after the closure of Tehran-e Mosavar and of the trade union of Iranian journalists Massoud Behnoud didn't have any possibilities to continue his work. From 1981 to 1985 he led a low profile existence (more or less in hiding) in Tehran. In 1985 he was one of the founders of Adineh. For more than 13 years Massoud Behnoud was one of the members of the editorial board.

== Arrest and imprisonment ==
After the crackdown on Iranian newspapers, Massoud Behnoud was imprisoned for 23 months for charges that included drug trafficking. Other well known journalists, including Mashallah Shamsolvaezin, Akbar Ganji, Emadeddin Baqi and Ebrahim Nabavi, were also jailed. Behnoud was fined the equivalent of US$15,000. The court accused him of "having provoked public opinion, insulting the Supreme Leader of the Islamic Republic and the commander of the Revolutionary guards". Behnoud's imprisonment provoked condemnation from many international human rights groups, including Amnesty International, International PEN and Reporters Without Borders.

== Prison ==
Serving a period of six months, two of which he spent in alleged solitary confinement, Massoud Behnoud was released on temporary bail of approximately US$40,000.

On 1 June 2002, while Behnoud was engaged in a European lecture tour, the Iranian judiciary announced that an order for his arrest had once again been issued. On base of this order he had to come back to Iran to serve the remainder of his 16 months term in prison, but he refused to go back.

== Bibliography ==
Masoud Behnoud has written six books on the contemporary history of Iran.

- Kaveh Golestan: Recording the Truth in Iran, by Masoud Behnoud, Hengameh Golestan and Malu Halasa, 2007
- Khanoum by Masoud Behnoud and Sara Phillips, 2008
- Robin Hood of the Desert, by Masoud Behnoud and Pooya Yazdani, 2011
- In Seh Zan (These Three Women). Tehran: Elm. 1995. p. 464. ISBN 964-5989-07-8.

== See also ==
- Intellectual movements in Iran
- Mehdi Jami
- Ahmad Zeidabadi
- Alireza Nourizadeh
