= Reza Baraheni =

Iranian writer and academic (1935–2022)

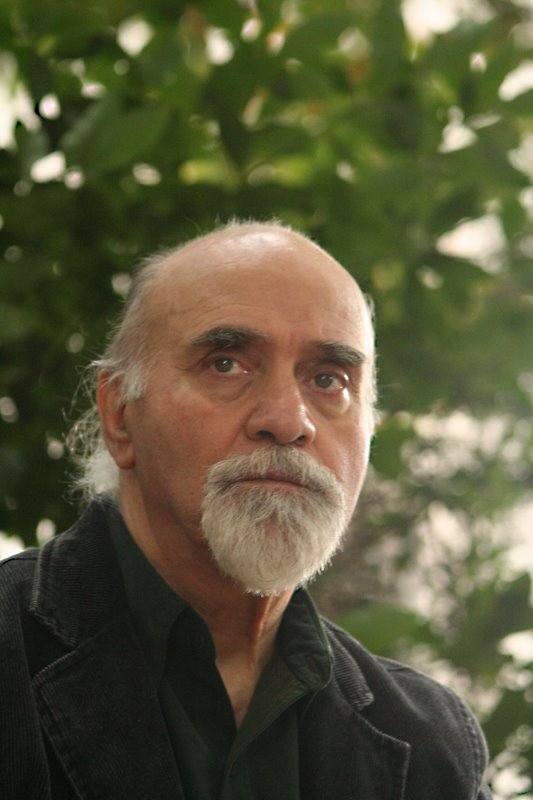
- Born: 13 December 1935; Tabriz, Iran
- Died: 25 March 2022 (aged 86); Toronto, Canada
- Occupations: Novelist, poet and critic

Reza Baraheni (Persian: رضا براهنی; 13 December 1935 – 25 March 2022) was an Iranian novelist, poet, critic, and political activist.

Baraheni was born in Tabriz, Iran, in 1935. After studying there and in Turkey, he obtained a Ph.D. in English literature from the University of Istanbul, and in 1963 was appointed Professor of English at Teheran University.

Baraheni lived in Toronto, Canada, where he taught at the Center for Comparative Literature at the University of Toronto.

He was the author of more than fifty books of poetry, fiction and literary theory and criticism in Persian and English. His works have been translated into a dozen languages. Moreover, he translated into Persian works by Shakespeare, Kundera, Mandelstam, Andrić, and Fanon.

Winner of the Scholars-at-Risk-Program Award of the University of Toronto and Massey College, Baraheni taught at the University of Tehran, Iran, the University of Texas at Austin, Indiana University in Bloomington, Indiana, the University of Maryland, Baltimore County, and York University. He was also a Fellow of St. Antony's College, Oxford University, Britain, Fellow of the University of Iowa, Iowa City, and Fellow of Winters College, York University. He was president of PEN Canada.

He died on 24 March 2022 in Toronto, Canada, and was buried on 9 April 2022 at Elgin Mills Cemetery, Canada.

== Bibliography ==
=== English ===
- God's Shadow: Prison Poems (Indiana University Press, Bloomington - 1976)
- The Crowned Cannibals: Writings on Repression in Iran (Random House, Vintage, New York - 1977, introduction by E. L. Doctorow)
- Accosting the Butterflies: Selected Persian and English Poetry ‘Khatab be Parvaneh ha’ (Butterfly Art House - 2024)

==== Anthologies ====
- Approaching Literature in the 21st Century - ed. Peter Schakel and Jack Ridl (Bedford/St. Martin’s, Boston - 2005)
- God’s Spies - ed. Alberto Manguel (Macfarlane, Walter & Ross, Toronto - 1999)
- The Prison Where I Live, ed. Siobhan Dowd, Foreword by Joseph Brodsky (Cassell, London - 1996)

=== French ===
==== Novels ====
Written in Persian:

- Les Saisons en Enfer du Jeune Ayyaz (Pauvert - Paris, 2000)
- Shéhérazade et Son Romancier (2ème éd.) (Fayard - Paris, 2002)
- Elias à New-York (Fayard - Paris, 2004)
- Les Mystères de Mon Pays - vol. 1 (Fayard - Paris, 2009)
- Les Mystères de Mon Pays - vol. 2 (Fayard - Paris, to be published 2012)

==== Short stories and other texts ====
- Lilith (Fayard - Paris, 2007)
- Une Femme (remue.net - Paris, 2007)
- Le Poète Comme Prisonnier (remue.net - Paris, 2007)
- L'aveuglement Exilique (remue.net - Paris, 2007)

==== Poems ====
- Aux papillons (excerpts) (Revue Diasporiques n°11 - Paris, 2010)
