= Human rights in the Islamic Republic of Iran =

State of human rights in Iran since 1979

The state of human rights in the Islamic Republic of Iran has generally been regarded as extremely poor by several international organisations and bodies. The United Nations General Assembly and the Human Rights Commission have condemned prior and ongoing abuses in Iran in published critiques and several resolutions. The government is criticized both for restrictions and punishments that follow the Islamic Republic's constitution and law, and for "extrajudicial" actions by state actors, such as the torture, rape, and killing of political prisoners, and the beatings and killings of dissidents and other civilians. Capital punishment in Iran remains a matter of international concern.

Restrictions and punishments in the Islamic Republic of Iran which violate international human rights norms include harsh penalties for crimes, punishment of victimless crimes such as fornication and homosexuality, execution of offenders under 18 years of age, restrictions on freedom of speech and the press (including the imprisonment of journalists), and restrictions on freedom of religion and gender equality in the Islamic Republic's Constitution (especially ongoing persecution of Baháʼís).

Reported abuses falling outside of the laws of the Islamic Republic that have been condemned include the execution of thousands of political prisoners in 1988, and the widespread use of torture to extract repudiations by prisoners of their cause and comrades on video for propaganda purposes. Also condemned has been firebombing of newspaper offices and attacks on political protesters by "quasi-official organs of repression," particularly "Hezbollahi," and the murder of dozens of government opponents in the 1990s, allegedly by "rogue elements" of the government.

According to Human Rights Watch, Iran's human rights record "deteriorated markedly" under the administration of President Mahmoud Ahmadinejad. Following the 2009 election protests, there were reports of torture, rape, and even murder committed against protesters, as well as the arrest and publicized mass trials of dozens of prominent opposition figures in which defendants "read confessions that bore every sign of being coerced." The United Nations human rights office stated in October 2012 that Iranian authorities had engaged in a "severe clampdown" on journalists and human rights advocates.

Officials of the Islamic Republic have responded to criticism by stating that Iran has "the best human rights record" in the Muslim world; that it is not obliged to follow "the West's interpretation" of human rights; and that the Islamic Republic is a victim of "biased propaganda of enemies" which is "part of a greater plan against the world of Islam". According to Iranian officials, those who human rights activists say are peaceful political activists being denied due process rights are actually guilty of offenses against the national security of the country, and those protesters claiming Ahmadinejad stole the 2009 election are actually part of a foreign-backed plot to topple Iran's leaders.

As of 2019, issues of concern presented by Amnesty International include the use of lethal force, killing over 300 people to unlawfully crush November protests; arbitrary detention of thousands of protesters; sentences of imprisonment and flogging for over 200 human rights defenders; entrenched discrimination, torture and other ill-treatment for ethnic and religious minorities; a crackdown on women's campaigning against forced veiling laws.

== Background ==
=== History ===
The Islamic revolution is thought to have a significantly worse human rights record than the Pahlavi dynasty it overthrew. According to political historian Ervand Abrahamian, "whereas less than 100 political prisoners had been executed between 1971 and 1979, more than 7900 were executed between 1981 and 1985. ... the prison system was centralized and drastically expanded ... Prison life was drastically worse under the Islamic Republic than under the Pahlavis. One who survived both writes that four months under [warden] Ladjevardi took the toll of four years under SAVAK. In the prison literature of the Pahlavi era, the recurring words had been 'boredom' and 'monotony'. In that of the Islamic Republic, they were 'fear', 'death', 'terror', 'horror', and most frequent of all 'nightmare' ('kabos')." According to estimates provided by the military historian Spencer C. Tucker, in the period of 1980 to 1985, between 25,000 and 40,000 Iranians were arrested, 15,000 Iranians were tried and 8,000 to 9,500 Iranians were executed.

The vast majority of killings of political prisoners occurred in the first decade of the Islamic Republic, after which violent repression lessened. With the rise of the Iranian reform movement and the election of moderate Iranian president Mohammad Khatami in 1997, numerous attempts were made to amend Iranian laws in order to improve women’s rights, most of which were rejected or significantly watered down by the Guardian Council and other conservative institutions. The period also saw a temporary expansion of the independent press.

According to The Economist magazine,

The Tehran spring of ten years ago has now given way to a bleak political winter. The new government continues to close down newspapers, silence dissenting voices and ban or censor books and websites. The peaceful demonstrations and protests of the Khatami era are no longer tolerated: in January 2007 security forces attacked striking bus drivers in Tehran and arrested hundreds of them. In March police beat hundreds of men and women who had assembled to commemorate International Women's Day.

=== International criticism ===
Results of 2015 Pew Research Center poll. World Views of Iran Sorted by Favorable - Unfavorable
Country polled	Favorable	Unfavorable	Neutral	Fav - Unfav
Israel	5%	92%	3	-87
Jordan	8%	89%	11	-81
Spain	7%	87%	6	-80
Italy	9%	87%	4	-78
Brazil	11%	79%	10	-68
Germany	15%	78%	7	-63
France	19%	81%	0	-62
United States	14%	76%	10	-62
Japan	15%	73%	12	-58
Poland	14%	67%	19	-53
Chile	16%	68%	16	-52
Australia	17%	67%	16	-50
Canada	16%	66%	18	-50
Argentina	10%	59%	31	-49
Mexico	13%	62%	25	-49
Turkey	17%	64%	19	-47
United Kingdom	17%	62%	21	-45
South Africa	18%	57%	35	-39
China	23%	61%	16	-38
Venezuela	22%	58%	20	-36
Peru	19%	48%	33	-29
South Korea	30%	56%	14	-26
Palestine	34%	57%	9	-23
Philippines	33%	56%	11	-23
Lebanon	41%	58%	1	-19
Kenya	32%	50%	18	-18
Ukraine	26%	42%	32	-16
Malaysia	34%	47%	19	-13
Uganda	32%	43%	25	-11
Nigeria	33%	43%	24	-10
Russia	34%	44%	22	-10
Burkina Faso	25%	34%	41	-9
Senegal	32%	39%	39	-7
Indonesia	36%	41%	23	-5
Tanzania	29%	34%	37	-5
India	28%	28%	44	0
Vietnam	42%	35%	23	7
Ghana	44%	36%	20	8
Ethiopia	27%	18%	55	9
Pakistan	57%	16%	27	41

Since the founding of the Islamic Republic, human rights violations of religious minorities have been the subject of resolutions and decisions by the United Nations and its human rights bodies, the Council of Europe, European Parliament and United States Congress. In addition, non-governmental human rights groups such as Human Rights Watch, Amnesty International, the Center for Human Rights in Iran, have issued reports and expressed concern over issues such as the treatment of religious minorities, prison conditions, medical conditions of prisoners, deaths of prisoners (Vahid Sayadi Nasiri), mass arrests of anti-government demonstrators.

In early 1980, Iran became one of the few countries to ever be investigated by a UN country rapporteur under the UN Special Procedures section. Four years later the United Nations Commission on Human Rights appointed a Special Representative on Iran to study its human rights situation and as of 2001 three men have filled that role. According to The Minority Rights Group, in 1985 Iran became "the fourth country ever in the history of the United Nations" to be placed on the agenda of the General Assembly because of "the severity and the extent of this human rights record". From 1984 to 2001, United Nations Commission on Human Rights (UNCHR) passed resolutions about human rights violations against Iran's religious minorities, especially the persecution of Baháʼís. The UNCHR did not pass such a resolution in 2002, when the government of Iran extended an invitation to the UN "Working Group on Arbitrary Detention and the Special Rapporteur on the promotion and protection of the right to freedom of opinion and expression" to visit the country and investigate complaints. However, according to the organization Human Rights Watch, "when these officials did visit the country, found human rights conditions wanting and issued reports critical of the Islamic government, not only did the government not implement their recommendations", it retaliated "against witnesses who testified to the experts."

In 2003 the resolutions began again with Canada sponsoring a resolution criticizing Iran's "confirmed instances of torture, stoning as a method of execution and punishment such as flogging and amputations," following the death of an Iranian-born Canadian citizen, Zahra Kazemi, in an Iranian prison. The resolution has passed in the UN General Assembly every year since.

The European Union has also criticized the Islamic Republic's human rights record, expressing concern in 2005, 2007 and on 6 October 2008 presenting a message to Iran's ambassador in Paris expressing concern over the worsening human rights situation in Iran. On 13 October 2005, the European Parliament voted to adopt a resolution condemning the Islamic government's disregard of the human rights of its citizens. Later that year, Iran's government announced it would suspend dialogue with the European Union concerning human rights in Iran. On 9 February 2010, the European Union and United States issued a joint statement condemning "continuing human rights violations" in Iran.

On 2 September 2020, Amnesty International accused Iranian authorities of committing widespread human rights violations, during the 2019 protests. The nationwide protests were sparked by soaring fuel prices. In response to protests, the government reportedly caused hundreds of deaths with deliberate use of lethal force, in addition to 7,000 arrests. According to a report, the detainees included children who were subjected to beatings, extreme temperatures, stress positions and electrocution.

On 17 May 2022, the spokeswoman for the United Nations Human Rights Office requested Iran to suspend the execution of Swedish-Iranian academic Ahmadreza Djalali and to commute his death sentence.

=== Relative openness ===
In 2005, Afshin Molavi asserted that the scale of repression in Iran diminished while new avenues of political expression opened up during the presidency of Mohammad Khatami, thereby emboldening the Iranian public and civil society activists to become more vocal in their criticism of the Iranian government. American journalist Elaine Sciolino wrote:

"Shiite Islam thrives on debate and discussion ... So freedom of thought and expression is essential to the system, at least within the top circles of religious leadership. And if the mullahs can behave that way among themselves in places like the holy city of Qom, how can the rest of a modern-day society be told it cannot think and explore the world of experience for itself?"

Another hypothesis offered by Iranians (Akbar Ganji, Arzoo Osanloo, Hooman Majd) is that "notions of democracy and human rights have taken root among the Iranian people" making it "much more difficult for the government to commit crimes" than the Shah's government did (Akbar Ganji). Writing about the reform period during the presidency of Mohammad Khatami Iranian-American academic Arzoo Osanloo notes that, "liberal notions of rights are almost hegemonic in Iran today." And journalist Hooman Majd explains the Islamic Republic's relative tolerance by claiming that if Iranian intelligence services "were to arrest anyone who speaks ill of the government in private, they simply couldn't build cells fast enough to hold their prisoners."

==== Perspective of the Islamic Republic ====
Iranian officials have not always agreed on the state of human rights in Iran. In April 2004, reformist president Mohammad Khatami stated "we certainly have political prisoners [in Iran] and ... people who are in prison for their ideas." Two days later, however, he was contradicted by Judiciary chief Ayatollah Mahmoud Hashemi Shahroudi, saying "we have no political prisoners in Iran" because Iranian law does not mention such offenses, ... "The world may consider certain cases, by their nature, political crimes, but because we do not have a law in this regard, these are considered ordinary offenses."

Iran's President Mahmoud Ahmadinejad and other government officials have compared Iran's human rights record favorably to other countries, particularly countries that have criticized Iran's record. In a 2008 speech, he replied to a question about human rights by stating that Iran has fewer prisoners than the US and "the human rights situation in Iran is relatively a good one, when compared ... with some European countries and the United States."

In a 2007 speech to the United Nations, Ahmadinejad commented on human rights only to say "certain powers" (unnamed) were guilty of violating it, "setting up secret prisons, abducting persons, trials and secret punishments without any regard to due process, .... " Islamic Republic officials have also attacked Israeli violations of Palestinian human rights.

According to Reza Afshari, the Islamic Republic's stance about the universality of human rights is founded in its assertion that religion is "the supreme cultural principle". Thus, government ideologues question the universality of human rights, with Ayatollah Ali Khamenei urging functionaries to reject "the Western notion of human rights." According to Afshari, officials place emphasis on "human" rather than on rights, with the aim of obtaining a "true" human being ("mindful of God's presence and fearful of divine injunctions") before their rights can be considered. The aim is to create "the perfect human", something that stands in "sharp contrast with the goal of Western liberalism, which created normal humans."

== Constitutional and legal foundations ==
The Constitution of the Islamic Republic of Iran was adopted by referendum on 2 and 3 December 1979, and amended on 28 July 1989.

The constitution has been called a "hybrid" of "theocratic and democratic elements". Like many democratic constitutions, it has articles mandating a president and legislature, and regular popular elections to fill their seats (article 6). Also like most modern secular constitutions, it calls for rights for its citizens—equal rights for women (article 20), and protection of their rights (article 21); freedom of expression (article 23); freedom of press and communication (article 24), freedom of association (article 27); freedom for religious minorities (provided they are Zoroastrian, Jewish, or Christian) "to perform their religious rites and ceremonies."

Unlike most constitutions, it vests sovereignty in God (articles 1–2); it mandates appointed governing bodies (the Supreme Leader and Guardian Council) that supervise and subordinate the elected president and legislature/majlis (articles 107–112). And its clauses declaring the rights of women, of expression, of communication and association, of the press – are followed by modifiers such as "within the limits of the law", "within the precepts of Islam", "unless they attack the principles of Islam", "unless the Law states otherwise", "as long as it does not interfere with the precepts of Islam." — what one scholar calls "ominous Catch-22s".

These principles/limits/precepts of Islam that differed from those of the Universal Declaration of Human Rights included

- Sharia law. Although law in the IRI differs somewhat from pure sharia, with the "monitoring and supervision" of the Guardian Council, "Islamic criminal law became the basis for definition of crimes and their classification" in the IRI. Sharia law as interpreted in the Islamic Republic, calls for inequality of rights between genders, religions, sexual orientation, as well as for other internationally criticized practices such as stoning as a method of execution. In 1984, Iran's representative to the United Nations, Sai Rajaie-Khorassani, declared the Universal Declaration of Human Rights to be representing a "secular understanding of the Judeo-Christian tradition", which could not be implemented by Muslims and did not "accord with the system of values recognized by the Islamic Republic of Iran" which would "therefore not hesitate to violate its provisions."
- Like other Islamists, Ayatollah Khomeini believed it was essential that Muslims (and eventually everyone) be governed by Islamic law/Sharia, but the uniqueness of his message came in first calling for Sharia/Islamic government to be run by the leading Islamic jurist or faqīh, and later after he came to power, declaring in an early 1988 fatwa that Iran's Islamic government was "a branch of the absolute governance of the Prophet of God" and "among the primary ordinances of Islam," having "precedence over all secondary ordinances such as prayer, fasting, and pilgrimage." According to scholar Ervand Abrahamian, in the eyes of Iranian officials, "the survival of the Islamic Republic – and therefore of Islam itself – justified the means used," and trumped any right of the individual. (Moharebeh, or "enemy of God", which in Islamic history often formed a legal category that comprises highway robbery (or robbery with violence), rape, and terrorism, is widely used by Iran's Islamic Judiciary, as a charge "against those who take up arms against the state.")

=== Provisions in violation of Human Rights ===
==== Harsh punishments ====
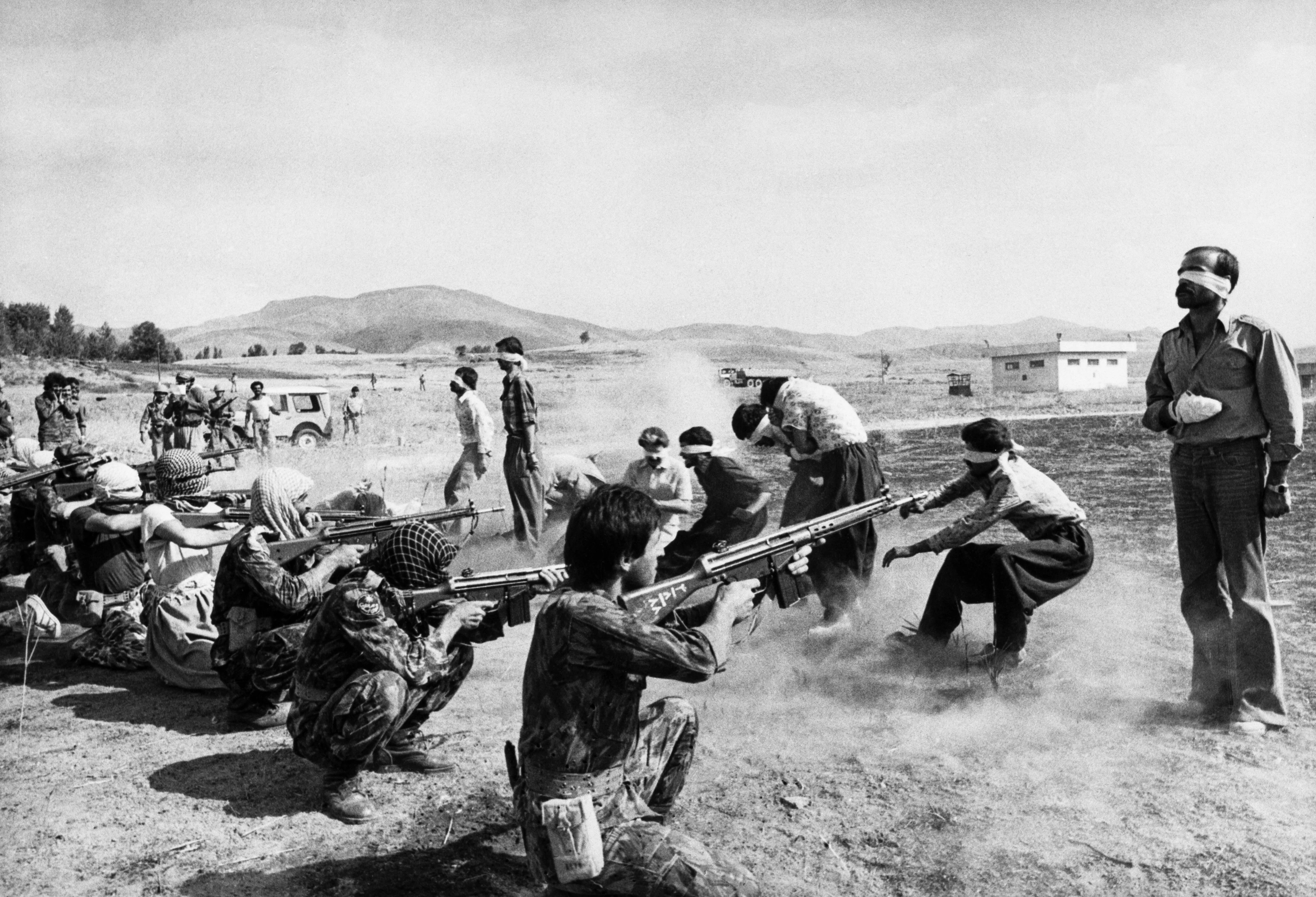
A revolutionary firing squad in 1979

For the category of offenses known as Hudud (violations of the "rights of God" with "fixed punishment") in Sharia, the Iranian penal code calls for punishments such as death by hanging, stoning or decapitation. Lesser crimes are punished by amputation or flagellation. (Crimes in this category include adultery, alcohol consumption, burglary or petty theft, rebellions against Islamic authority, apostasy and homosexual intercourse).

Non-Hudud crimes against the body (bodily injury) or against the person (homicide), such as murder or rape, are considered "private" crimes in Sharia, in the sense that the victim or family of the victim can exercise a right to retribution (Qisas, aka Eye for an eye), or decide to accept "blood money" (Diyyah or Talion Law). Intentional bodily injury or homicide "resulting in amputation of body organs, infliction of wounds and blinding is entitled to seek retaliation, and death penalty could be imposed by way of retaliation for intentional homicide upon the request of the heirs of the victim – with the exception of the spouse." Accidental or semi-intentional acts that cause bodily harm or death or in cases where they were caused intentionally but a sentence of retaliation could not be pronounced qualify for Blood money/Diyyah. A fourth category is Ta’zirat or discretionary punishment, and comprises any act considered sinful or forbidden under Islamic law, that was not included in the other three categories. The "vast majority" of offences in the Iranian judiciary system "are related to Ta’zirat crimes." In Iran, at least the early Ta’zirat codes (in 1983) replaced pre-revolutionary punishments such as fine and imprisonment with "the Sharia-oriented punishment of flogging".

All these categories are problematic in the eyes of human rights groups, and the tension between Sharia supporters and international and domestic pressure is reflected in the 17 January 2019 statement by Iran's Attorney-General, Mohammed Jafar Montazeri: "Unfortunately, so as not be condemned of human rights issues in the United Nations, we have abandoned some of the divine laws".

Types

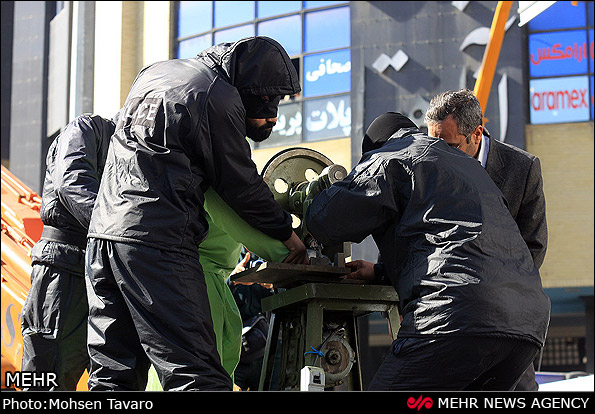
Amputation being carried out as punishment in Iran

Amputation. Following Sharia, amputation is a punishment for thieves. Article 201 of the Islamic Penal Code, the sentence for a first time robbery is the amputation of four fingers of the thief's right hand; for a second conviction, it's the thief's left foot, (and for the third time, the defendant is sentenced to life in prison). Advocates have noted that it is "difficult, if not impossible ... to walk, even with a cane or crutches" when an offender has lost their right hand and left foot. This was the fate, for example, of five convicted robbers in the Sistan-Baluchistan Province in January 2008 according to the news agency ISNA. Amputation is widespread enough in the IRI to have been used on at least 129 offenders from 2000 to 2020 (according to the Abdorrahman Boroumand Center). On 3 December 2020, Amnesty International released a detailed analysis report calling the Iranian authority to drop the plans to amputate the fingers of six men convicted of robbery post the unfair trials and confession based on torture. The authorities & prison officials of Urumieh province are preparing to bring the guillotine machine to the prison to amputate the fingers of six convicts. Other criticism of the punishment are that the victims "can no longer easily button their clothes or do their daily jobs", and if they stole because of poverty loss of a functioning hand increases their financial need.

Stoning. Stoning is the form of execution for only one crime in Iran - adultery. From 1980 to 2009 150 people were reportedly stoned to death in Iran, but in 2002, authorities placed a moratorium on this form of execution. As of 2018, women were still being sentenced to stoning in Iran. Sharia explicitly states that stones used must be small enough to not kill instantly.

Flogging. According to Amnesty International, flogging "amounts" to torture. In the IRI it serves as punishment for a variety of crimes in the IRI—theft, assault, but also "participating in peaceful protests, engaging in extramarital relationships, attending mixed-gender parties and drinking alcohol". At least 2,134 people, (including 17 under the age of 18), were flogged between 2000 and 2020 in the IRI (according to the Abdorrahman Boroumand Center).

Blinding. Under Sharia policy of qisas (retribution), at least one case of punishment by blinding has occurred in Iran, when a man had his eye gouged out following his conviction for throwing acid in a woman's face. The punishment has been attacked as barbaric.

In August 2021, hacks of governmental surveillance cameras revealed constant beatings and draggings of prisoners by staff.

==== Gender issues ====
The Iranian legislation does not accord the same rights to women as to men in all areas of the law. Supreme Leader Ayatollah Ali Khamenei has stated that gender equality was "one of the biggest mistakes of Western thought."

- In the section of the penal code devoted to blood money, or Diyya, the value of woman's life is half that of a man ("for instance, if a car hit both on the street, the cash compensation due to the woman's family was half that due the man's")
- The testimony of a male witness is equivalent to that of two female witnesses.
- A woman needs her husband's permission to work outside the home or leave the country.

In the inheritance law of the Islamic Republic there are several instances where the woman is entitled to half the inheritance of the man. For example:

- If a man dies without offspring, his estate is inherited by his parents. If both the parents are alive, the mother receives 1/3 and the father 2/3 of the inheritance, unless the mother has a hijab (relative who reduces her part, such as brothers and sisters of the deceased (article 886)), in which case she shall receive 1/6, and the father 5/6. (Article 906)
- If the dead man's closest heirs are aunts and uncles, the part of the inheritance belonging to the uncle is twice that belonging to the aunt. (Article 920)
- When the heirs are children, the inheritance of the sons is twice that of the daughters. (Article 907)
- If the deceased leaves ancestors and brothers and sisters (kalaleh), 2/3s of the estate goes to the heirs which have relationship on the side of the father; and in dividing up this portion the males take twice the portion of the females; however, the 1/3 going to the heirs on the mother's side is divided equally. (Article 924)

According to Zahra Eshraghi, granddaughter of Ayatollah Khomeini,

"Discrimination here [in Iran] is not just in the constitution. As a woman, if I want to get a passport to leave the country, have surgery, even to breathe almost, I must have permission from my husband."

Compulsory hijab

Post-pubescent women are required to cover their hair and body in Iran and can be arrested for failing to do so.

In March 2019, a prominent Iranian human rights lawyer Nasrin Sotoudeh, who represented opposition activists and women prosecuted for taking off their mandatory headscarf, was sentenced to 38 years in jail and 148 lashes. Javaid Rehman, the UN investigator on human rights in Iran, raised Sotoudeh's case at the United Nations Human Rights Council, saying "Worrying patterns of intimidation, arrest, prosecution and ill-treatment of human rights defenders, lawyers and labour rights activists signal an increasingly severe state response".

==== Victimless crimes ====
Among the crimes that may be punishable by death in Iran are '"insulting the prophet," "apostasy," same-sex relations, adultery, and certain non-violent drug-related offenses'.

==== Freedom of expression and media ====
The 1985 press law prohibits "discourse harmful to the principles of Islam" and "public interest", as referred to in Article 24 of the constitution ("Publications and the press have freedom of expression except when it is detrimental to the fundamental principles of Islam or the rights of the public. The details of this exception will be specified by law"), which according to Human Rights Watch provides "officials with ample opportunity to censor, restrict, and find offense."

Iranian model Bahareh Zare Bahari was stranded for several weeks at Manila's international airport in 2019 after Iran sought her through an Interpol red notice. Bahari criticised the Iran regime, leading to fears that she would be executed if returned to Iran.

The Philippine government eventually granted her asylum.

==== Freedom and equality of religion ====
The constitution accords non-Shia Muslims "full respect" (article 12). It also recognizes the freedom of Zoroastrian, Jewish, and Christian Iranians to perform their religious rites and ceremonies, and five seats in parliament are set aside for these minority religions. But as an Islamic Republic "based on the governance of the [Twelver Ja’afari Shia] jurisprudent (velāyat-e faqih)," by definition the government of Iran does not grant equal rights to all religions. Legislation is based on the "Qur’an and the Sunnah", the president and Supreme Leader must be from the "official religion of the country" i.e. Twelver Ja’afari Shiism Non-Muslims are not allowed to serve in representative bodies—aside from the five reserved parliamentary seats—and "cannot hold senior government or military positions, and face restrictions in employment, education, and property ownership."

Other inequalities include Hudud statutes that grant different punishments to Muslims and non-Muslims for the same crime. In the case of adultery, for example, a Muslim man who is convicted of committing adultery with a Muslim woman receives 100 lashes; the sentence for a non-Muslim man convicted of adultery with a Muslim woman is death.

Under traditional Islamic law, "blood money" (diyeh, financial compensation paid to the victim or heirs of a victim in the cases of murder, bodily harm or property damage) varies based on the gender and religion of the victim (Muslims and men being worth more). The International Religious Freedom Report reports that in 2004 the IRI parliament and Guardian Council reformed the law to equalized diyeh between Muslim, Christian, Jewish, and Zoroastrian men—but not Baháʼí men, since according to law their blood is considered Mobah, (i.e. it can be spilled with impunity).

Conversion to Islam by non-Muslims is encouraged in Iran, but conversion from Islam to another religion (apostasy) is prohibited with a maximum punishment of death. The penal code specifies the death sentence for non-Muslims attempting to convert Muslims, as well as for moharebeh ("enmity against God") and sabb al-nabi ("insulting the Prophet").

Article 23 of the constitution states, "the investigation of individuals' beliefs is forbidden, and no one may be molested or taken to task simply for holding a certain belief." But another article, 167, gives judges the discretion "to deliver his judgment on the basis of authoritative Islamic sources and authentic fatwa (rulings issued by qualified clerical jurists)." The founder of the Islamic Republic, Islamic cleric Ruhollah Khomeini, who was a grand Ayatollah, ruled "that the penalty for conversion from Islam, or apostasy, is death."

Perhaps suffering the most in Iran is the Baháʼí Faith, which the Islamic Republic claims are "an organized establishment linked to foreigners, the Zionists in particular," that threaten Iran. The International Federation for Human Rights and others believe the government's policy of persecution of Baháʼís stems from some Baháʼí teachings challenging traditional Islamic religious doctrines – particularly the finality of Muhammad's prophethood and the Shí'i ecclesiastical structure of endowments, benefices and fees that sustained the Shí'i clergy– and place Baháʼís outside the Islamic faith.

Islamic law against apostasy—including "heretics"—is thought to be involved in the persecution of the Baháʼí, because Iranian law recognizes all those who accept the existence of God and the prophethood of Muhammad as Muslims. Baháʼís accept both of these precepts, but also maintain their early leaders—Báb and Baháʼu'lláh—were additional messengers that have appeared after Muhammad. Muslims, on the other hand, assert the finality of Muhammad's revelation. So while Baháʼís describe themselves as members of an independent religion, Iranian law considers them to be claiming to be Muslims while violating a key precept of the religion, and thus heretics.

Also subject to Islamic "government suspicion and hostility" according to Human Rights Watch, is the small Protestant Christian minority in Iran, at least in part because of their "readiness to accept and even seek out Muslim converts" as well as their Western origins. In the 1990s, two Muslim converts to Christianity who had become ministers were sentenced to death for apostasy and other charges.

At least two Iranians – Hashem Aghajari and Hasan Yousefi Eshkevari – have been arrested and charged with apostasy (though not executed), not for converting to another faith but for statements and/or activities deemed by courts of the Islamic Republic to be in violation of Islam (i.e. of the Khomeini principle of obeying the political "guardianship" of the leading Islamic faqih)), but which appear to outsiders to be simply expressions of political/religious reformism. Hashem Aghajari, was found guilty of apostasy for a speech urging Iranians to "not blindly follow" Islamic clerics; Hassan Youssefi Eshkevari was charged with apostasy for attending the reformist-oriented 'Iran After the Elections' Conference in Berlin Germany which was disrupted by anti-government demonstrators.

On 16 November 2018 two jailed Sufi Dervishes started a hunger strike demanding the information of whereabouts of their eight detained friends, and also during that time, the prison warden Qarchak women prison in Varamin, near the Tehran attacked and bit three Dervish prisoners when they demanded their confiscated belongings back.

==== Political freedom ====
Article 26 of the IRI constitution allows "the formation of parties, societies, political or professional associations, as well as religious societies ... [which] No one may be prevented from participating in ... or be compelled to participate in them;" but it limits this freedom: "provided they do not violate the principles of independence, freedom, national unity, the criteria of Islam, or the basis of the Islamic Republic". Article 27 grants "Freedom of Assembly": "Public gatherings and marches may be freely held, provided arms are not carried", but limits it again to gatherings "that they are not detrimental to the fundamental principles of Islam".

In a 2008 report, the organization Human Rights Watch complained that "broadly worded 'security laws'" in Iran are used "to arbitrarily suppress and punish individuals for peaceful political expression, association, and assembly, in breach of international human rights treaties to which Iran is party." For example, "connections to foreign institutions, persons, or sources of funding" are enough to bring criminal charges such as "undermining national security" against individuals.

Freedom House has also complained that the constitution's prohibition on public demonstrations that "violate the principles of Islam," is "a vague provision used to justify the heavy-handed dispersal of assemblies and marches".

Ahmad Batebi, a demonstrator in the July 1999 Student demonstrations in Iran, was given a death sentence for "endangering national security." His sentence was later reduced to 15 years and then 10 years imprisonment after domestic and international outcry. A photograph of Batebi holding a bloody shirt aloft was printed on the cover of The Economist magazine.

==== Children's rights ====
According to the "predominant view" in the Shia Jaʽfari jurisprudence, the age of maturity is not the international standard of 18 years, but "9 lunar years (8 years and 9 months) for girls, and 15 lunar years (14 years and 7 months) for boys". This is also the age of maturity and "criminal responsibility" in Article 1210 of the Iranian Civil Code and Article 147 of the 2013 Code.

Despite signing the Convention on the Rights of the Child, Iran, according to human rights groups, is the world's largest executioner of juvenile offenders. As of May 2009, there were at least 137 known juvenile offenders awaiting execution in Iran, but the total number could be much higher as many death penalty cases in Iran are believed to go unreported. Of the 43 child offenders recorded as having been executed since 1990, 11 were still under the age of 18 at the time of their execution while the others were either kept on death row until they had reached 18 or were convicted and sentenced after reaching that age, including at least one 13-year-old and 14-year-old.

A bill to set the minimum age for the death penalty at 18 years was examined by the parliament in December 2003, but it was not ratified by the Guardian Council of the Constitution, the unelected body that examines legislation for "compatibility ... with the criteria of Islam and the Constitution", and vetoes parliamentary bills it finds deficient. In a September 2008 interview President Mahmoud Ahmadinejad was asked about the execution of minors and replied that "the legal age in Iran is different from yours. It’s not eighteen ... it’s different in different countries."

On 10 February 2012 Iran's parliament changed the controversial law of executing juveniles. "In the new law, the age of 18 (solar year) would be for both genders considered and juvenile offenders will be sentenced on a separate law than of adults."

== Extralegal violations of human rights ==
Iran has been criticized by human rights groups for "extra-legal" or "extra-judicial" killings and other sanctions. A 2005 Human Rights Watch document criticizes "Parallel Institutions" (nahad-e movazi) in the Islamic Republic, "the quasi-official organs of repression that have become increasingly open in crushing student protests, detaining activists, writers, and journalists in secret prisons, and threatening pro-democracy speakers and audiences at public events." Under the control of the Office of the Supreme Leader, these groups set up arbitrary checkpoints around Tehran, uniformed police often refraining from directly confronting these plainclothes agents. "Illegal prisons, which are outside of the oversight of the National Prisons Office, are sites where political prisoners are abused, intimidated, and tortured with impunity."

But according to dissident Akbar Ganji, what might appear to be "extra-legal" killings in Iran are actually not outside the penal code of the Islamic Republic since the code "authorises a citizen to assassinate another if he is judged to be 'impious'". Some widely condemned punishments issued by the Islamic Republic, though seemingly in violation of the constitution and not publicly acknowledged by the government — the torture of prisoners and the execution of thousands of political prisoners in 1988 — have been reported to follow at least some form of Islamic law and legal procedures.

Extra-legal acts may work in tandem with official actions, such as in the case of the newsweekly Tamadone Hormozgan in Bandar Abbas, where authorities arrested seven journalists in 2007 for "insulting Ayatollah Khomeini," while government organisations and Quranic schools organized vigilantes to "ransacked and set fire" to the paper's offices.

=== Torture and mistreatment of prisoners ===
Article 38 of the constitution of the Islamic Republic forbids "all forms of torture for the purpose of extracting confession or acquiring information" and the "compulsion of individuals to testify, confess, or take an oath." It also states that "any testimony, confession, or oath obtained under duress is devoid of value and credence."

Nonetheless, human rights groups and observers have complained that torture is frequently used on political prisoners in Iran. In a study of torture in Iran published in 1999, Iranian-born political historian Ervand Abrahamian included Iran along with "Stalinist Russia, Maoist China, and early modern Europe" of the Inquisition and witch hunts, as societies that "can be considered to be in a league of their own" in the systematic use of torture.

Torture techniques used in the Islamic Republic include:

whipping, sometimes of the back but most often of the feet with the body tied on an iron bed; the qapani; deprivation of sleep; suspension from ceiling and high walls; twisting of forearms until they broke; crushing of hands and fingers between metal presses; insertion of sharp instruments under the fingernails; cigarette burns; submersion under water; standing in one place for hours on end; mock executions; and physical threats against family members. Of these, the most prevalent was the whipping of soles, obviously because it was explicitly sanctioned by the sharia.

Two "innovations" in torture not borrowed from the Shah's regime were

the 'coffin', and compulsory watching of – and even participation in – executions. Some were placed in small cubicles, [50cm x 80 cm x 140 cm (20 inches x 31.5 inches x 55 inches)] blindfolded and in absolute silence, for 17-hour stretches with two 15-minute breaks for eating and going to the toilet. These stints could last months – until the prisoner agreed to the interview. Few avoided the interview and also remained sane. Others were forced to join firing squads and remove dead bodies. When they returned to their cells with blood dripping from their hands, Their roommates surmised what had transpired. ...."

According to Abrahamian, torture became commonly used in the Islamic Republic because of its effectiveness in inducing political prisoners to make public confessions. Recorded and edited on videotape, the standard statements by prisoners included not only confessions to subversion and treason, but praise of the Islamic Revolution and denunciation or recantation of their former beliefs, former organization, former co-members, i.e. their life. These recantations served as powerful propaganda for both the Iranian public at large – who by the 1980s almost all had access to television and could watch prime time programs devoted to the taped confessions – and the recanters' former colleagues, for whom the denunciations were demoralizing and confusing. From the moment they arrived in prison, through their interrogation prisoners were asked if they were willing to give an "interview." (mosahebah) "Some remained incarcerated even after serving their sentences simply because they declined the honor of being interviewed."

Scholars disagree over whether at least some forms of torture have been made legal according to the Qanon-e Ta'zir (Discretionary Punishment Law) of the Islamic Republic. Abrahamian argues statutes forbidding 'lying to the authorities' and ability of clerics to be both interrogators and judges, applying an "indefinite series of 74 lashings until they obtain 'honest answers'" without the delay of a trial, make this a legal form of torture. Another scholar, Christoph Werner, claims he could find no Ta'zir law mentioning lying to authorities but did find one specifically banning torture in order to obtain confessions.

Abrahamian also argues that a strong incentive for authorities to produce a confession by a defendant (and thus a strong incentive to pressure the defendant to confess) is the Islamic Republic's allowing of a defendant's confession plus judges "reasoning" to constitute sufficient proof of guilt. He also states this is an innovation from the traditional sharia standard for (some) capital crimes of 'two honest and righteous male witnesses'.

Several bills passed the Iranian Parliament that would have had Iran joining the international convention on banning torture in 2003 when reformists controlled Parliament, but were rejected by the Guardian Council.

In March 2013 UK based medical charity Freedom from Torture published a report providing detailed evidence of torture being practiced in Iran. "We Will Make You Forget Everything: New Evidence of Torture in Iran Since the 2009 Elections", is a study of 50 Iranian torture cases and provides an alarming insight into the brutality of the Iranian authorities in the years since the 2009 elections. The report found that torture was used by state officials as a method of repression, in order to obtain information and that a variety of torture methods were used in a highly systematic way. In one case a woman was raped twice during interrogations and some reported being forced to sign 'confessions' of their involvement in anti-regime activities.

Chronicle of Higher Education International, reports that the widespread practice of raping women imprisoned for engaging in political protest has been effective in keeping female college students "less outspoken and less likely to take part" in political demonstrations. The journal quotes an Iranian college student as saying, "most of the girls arrested are raped in jail. Families can't cope with that."

On 28 November 2018 guards in khoy women prison, north west of Iran attacked inmate Zeynab Jalalian and confiscated all her belongings. She was arrested in February 2007.

On 20 December 2018 Human rights Watch urged the regime in Iran to investigate and find an explanation for the death of Vahid Sayadi Nasiri who had been jailed for insulting the Supreme Leader Ali Khamenei. According to his family Nasiri had been on hunger strike but he was denied medical attention before he died.

On 13 July 2020, the Amnesty International reported that imprisoned Iranian human rights defender, Narges Mohammadi, showed suspected COVID-19 symptoms. She was unjustly jailed in inhumane conditions in May 2015 for her peaceful human rights work. The Iranian authorities risked her health and life by denying her medical care, as she already suffered from serious pre-existing health conditions.

On 6 October 2020, the United Nations urged Iran to immediately release human rights lawyer Nasrin Sotoudeh, and other political prisoners, as Iran introduced a system of temporary releases to reduce the population in severely overcrowded prisons in February 2020. According to UN rights High Commissioner Bachelet, states are responsible for the well-being of all individuals under their care including human rights activists, lawyers and political prisoners.

Iran granted release of thousands of prisoners, over the fear of spread of coronavirus. In November 2020, Human rights lawyer Nasrin Sotoudeh was temporarily released, followed by her deteriorating health condition due to a long term hunger strike. She was prosecuted for fighting for the rights of women, who were jailed on removing headscarf in public.

== Notable issues concerning human rights ==
=== Killings during the first decade ===
Mass executions and killing of opponents took place during the early years of the Islamic Republic. Between January 1980 and the overthrow of President Abolhassan Banisadr in June 1981, at least 906 government opponents were executed. From June 1981 to June 1985, at least 8,000 were executed. Critics complained of brief trials lacking defense attorneys, juries, transparency or opportunity for the accused to defend themselves. In 1988, several thousand political prisoners were executed, estimates ranging somewhere between 8,000 and 30,000. Since the death of Ayatollah Ruhollah Khomeini there have been fewer government sanctioned killings in Iran.

=== Extrajudicial killings ===
In the 1990s there were a number of unsolved murders and disappearances of intellectuals and political activists who had been critical of the Islamic Republic system in some way. In 1998 these complaints came to a head with the killing of three dissident writers (Mohammad Jafar Pouyandeh, Mohammad Mokhtari, Majid Sharif), a political leader (Dariush Forouhar) and his wife in the span of two months, in what became known as the Chain murders or 1998 Serial Murders of Iran. of Iranians who had been critical of the Islamic Republic system in some way. Altogether more than 80 writers, translators, poets, political activists, and ordinary citizens are thought to have been killed over the course of several years. The deputy security official of the Ministry of Information, Saeed Emami was arrested for the killings and later committed suicide, many believe higher level officials were responsible for the killings. According to Iranterror.com, "it was widely assumed that [Emami] was murdered in order to prevent the leak of sensitive information about Ministry of Intelligence and Security operations, which would have compromised the entire leadership of the Islamic Republic."

The attempted murder and serious crippling of Saeed Hajjarian, a Ministry of Intelligence operative-turned-journalist and reformer, is believed to be in retaliation for his help in uncovering the chain murders of Iran and his help to the Iranian reform movement in general. Hajjarian was shot in the head by Saeed Asgar, a member of the Basij in March 2000.

At the international level, a German court ordered the arrest of a standing minister of the Islamic Republic – Minister of Intelligence Ali Fallahian – in 1997 for directing the 1992 murder of three Iranian-Kurdish dissidents and their translator at a Berlin restaurant, known as the Mykonos restaurant assassinations.

Two minority religious figures killed during this era were Protestant Christians Reverend Mehdi Dibaj, and Bishop Haik Hovsepian Mehr. On 16 January 1994, Rev. Mehdi, a convert to Christianity was released from prison after more than ten years of confinement, "apparently as a result of the international pressure." About six months later he disappeared after leaving a Christian conference in Karaj and his body was found 5 July 1994 in a forest West of Tehran. Six months earlier the man responsible for leading a campaign to free him, Bishop Haik Hovsepian Mehr, had met a similar end, disappearing on 19 January 1994. His body was found in the street in Shahr-e Rey, a Tehran suburb.

Iranian human rights activist Farshid Hakki went missing on 17 October 2018 on Saturday night in Tehran. According to the Le Monde diplomatique, "Farshid Hakki was reportedly stabbed to death near his house in Tehran and his body then burned. Shortly after the news of his death broke out on social media, on 22 October, Tehran’s police authorities claimed that he had committed suicide by self-immolation. Not unlike its Saudi rival, the Islamic Republic has a long history of trying to cover up state-sanctioned attempts to physically eliminate its critics, too."

=== Deaths in custody ===
In what has been called "an act of violence unprecedented in Iranian history" the Iranian government summarily, extrajudicially, and secretly executed thousands of political prisoners held in Iranian jails in the summer of 1988. According to Human Rights Watch the majority of prisoners had had unfair trials by the revolutionary courts, and in any case had not been sentenced to death. The "deliberate and systematic manner in which these extrajudicial executions took place constitutes a crime against humanity." The Iranian government has never "provided any information" on the executions because it has never acknowledged their existence. However, there is indication that government believed the prisoners were being tried according to Islamic law before being executed. According to reports of prisoners who escaped execution, the prisoners were all given a quick legal proceeding – however brief and unfair – with Mojahideen found guilty condemned as moharebs (those who war against God) and leftists as mortads (apostates from Islam). One complaint made against the mass killings was that almost all the prisoners executed had been arrested for relatively minor offenses, since those with serious charges had already been executed. The 1988 killings resembled the 'disappearances' of prisoners in 20th-century Latin America.

UN judge and leading human rights lawyer Geoffrey Robertson has urged the UN Security Council to set up a special court, along the lines of the International Tribunals for Yugoslavia and Rwanda, to try the men involved "for one of the worst single human rights atrocities since the Second World War."

The United Nations Special Rapporteur on the situation of human rights in the Islamic Republic of Iran and the UN Secretary General to the General Assembly highlighting the 1988 executions of Iranian political prisoners of political prisoners in the Islamic Republic of Iran. In her report, Special Rapporteur Asma Jahangir stated that "families of the victims have the right to a remedy, which includes the right to an effective investigation of the facts and public disclosure of the truth; and the right to reparation. The Special Rapporteur therefore calls on the Government to ensure that a thorough and independent investigation into these events is carried out." International civil society and NGOs urged the UN High Commissioner for Human Rights to establish a fact -finding mission to investigate the months-long 1988 massacre during which Iran's government executed an estimated 30,000 political prisoners, mostly activists of the People's Mojahedin Organization of Iran (PMOI / MEK).

Among those Iranians who have died under suspicious circumstances while in prison are

- Ali-Akbar Saidi Sirjani an Iranian writer, poet and journalist who died in prison in November 1994.
- In June 2003, Zahra Kazemi, a Canadian-Iranian photojournalist, died while in custody in Tehran's Evin prison. "Iranian authorities arrested her as she was photographing Evin prison. A few days later, Kazemi fell into a coma and died." Doctors examining her body determined that she died from a fractured skull and had been beaten, tortured, and raped.

Executions in Iran and Saudi Arabia (2010–2017)
Year	Saudi Arabia	Iran
2010	27	552
2011	82	634
2012	79	544
2013	79	704
2014	90	743
2015	158	977
2016	154	567
2017	146	507

=== Capital punishment ===
Iran retains the death penalty for a large number of offenses, among them cursing the Prophet, certain drug offenses, murder, and certain hudud crimes, including adultery, incest, rape, fornication, drinking alcohol, "sodomy", same-sex sexual conduct between men without penetration, lesbianism, "being at enmity with God" (mohareb), and "corruption on earth" (Mofsed-e-filarz). Drug offenses accounted for 58% of confirmed executions in Iran in 2016, but only 40% in 2017, a decrease that may reflect legislative reforms.

Despite being a signatory to the International Convention on Civil and Political Rights (ICCPR) and the Convention on the Rights of the Child (CRC), which states that "[the] sentence of death shall not be imposed for crimes committed by persons below eighteen years of age," Iran continues to execute minors for various offenses: At least four individuals were executed in Iran in 2017 for offenses committed before the age of eighteen.

Judicial executions in Iran are more common than in any other Middle Eastern state, surpassing Iran's nearest rival—Saudi Arabia—by nearly an order of magnitude according to Michael Rubin in 2017, although Iran's population is over twice as large as Saudi Arabia's. In 2017, Iran accounted for 60% of all executions in the Middle East/North Africa while Saudi Arabia accounted for 17% and Iraq accounted for 15%.

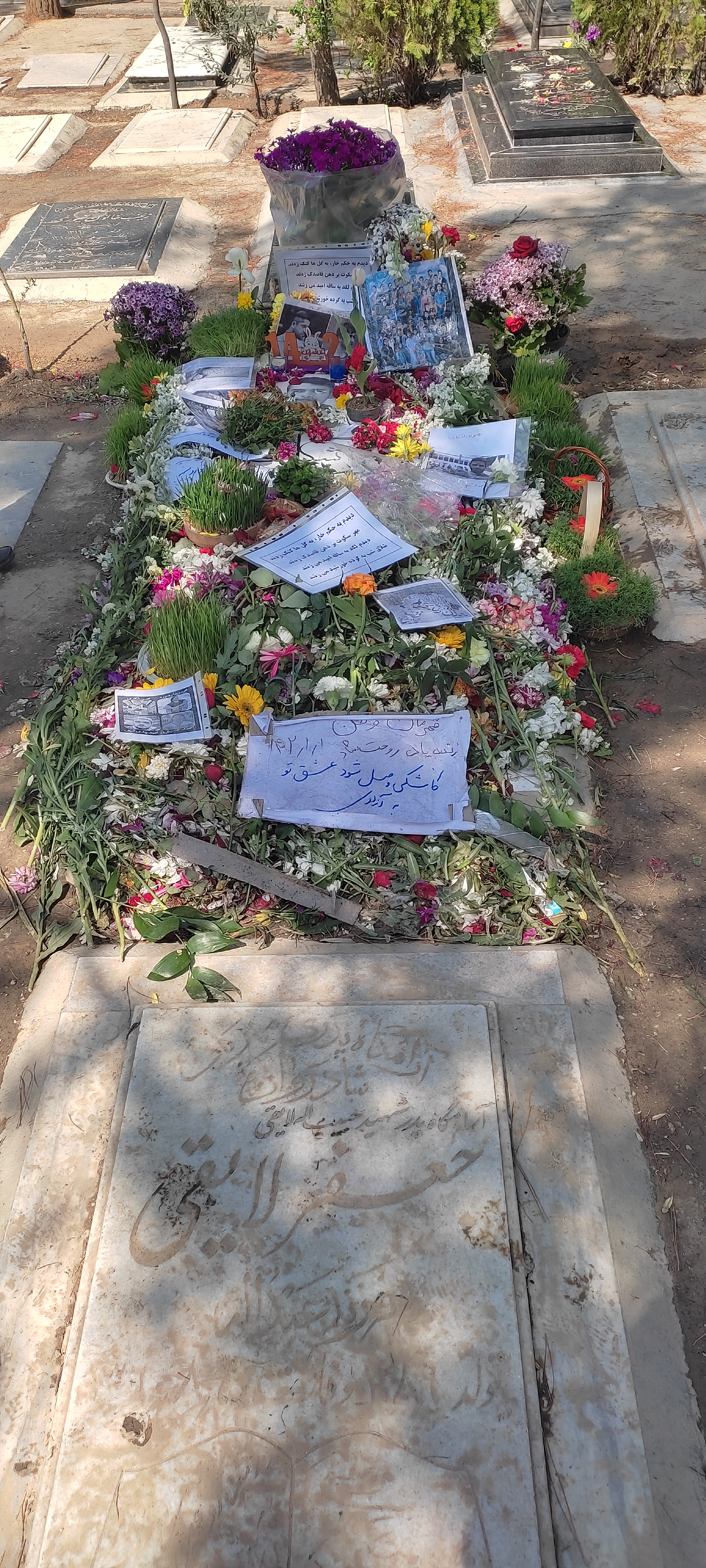
The grave of 23-year-old Mohsen Shekhari, who was executed following his conviction for injuring a Basij militia member and being accused of Moharebeh, a term meaning "waging war against God" in Arabic.

Iran has also been criticized for using stoning as capital punishment, though in 2005, an Iranian judiciary spokesman strongly denied the accusations of stoning and executing minors, describing them as "propaganda against the Iranian state".

In 2004, a teenage girl of the age of 16, Atefah Sahaaleh, was executed by hanging in a public square on adultery charges and "crimes against chastity". Numerous Iranian journalists and lawyers had "strong evidence that the judiciary had broken Iran's own law in executing Atefah", but this was difficult to show because of Iran's press censorship.

In 2016, 160 prisoners were on death row in Iran for crimes that they allegedly committed before being 18 years old.

In 2020, the Iranian film There Is No Evil won a prize at the Berlin International Film Festival. The film is about executions in Iran.

According to human rights groups Iran Human Rights and Together Against the Death Penalty, the Iranian government executed at least 1,639 people in 2025, the highest number of executions since 1989.

In March 2026, following the execution of a Swedish-Iranian dual national, Kaja Kallas, the EU's foreign policy chief, said, "The appalling human rights situation in Iran and the alarming increase in executions are intolerable and show the regime's true colours". Foreign Minister Maria Malmer Stenergard described the measure as an initial step, with further actions under consideration, and stated, "The death penalty is an inhumane, cruel, and irreversible punishment".

Continuous list of death sentences

The Iranian human rights group, IHRG, says that at the beginning of February 2020, about 20 inmates in Rajai shahr prison are on death row. The human rights organization asserts Iran's authorities do not divulge the real number executions.

=== Targeting human rights lawyers ===
Defending human rights activists has been called "one of the riskiest jobs in Iran", and harassment and imprisonment of human rights lawyers is an effective way of intimidating dissidents. As of June 2020, nine human rights attorneys have been arrested in Iran since 2018, and at least five of them are still in prison, according to the Center for Human Rights in Iran. As of 2018, several prominent human rights lawyers were imprisoned. Attorney Mohammad Najafi faced "national-security charges—and potentially years in prison"—for publicly accusing the IRI government of having "covered up the true cause of the jailhouse death of his client, a young protester involved in the recent economic demonstrations, according to the Center for Human Rights in Iran. Abdolfattah Soltani, who won the Nuremberg International Human Rights Award, in 2009, served time in prison in 2005 and 2009 and was sentenced to 18-year prison sentence in 2012 "for talking to the press about his clients’ cases and co-founding the Defenders of Human Rights Center." Hadi Esmaeilzadeh, died in prison, in 2014, during a second stint in jail, also for membership in Center for Human Rights in Iran. Nasrin Sotoudeh, who was awarded the 2012 Sakharov Prize by the European Parliament and has been called “one of the most important human rights lawyers in the Middle East", was sentenced to eleven years in 2009, later reduced to six. In June 2018, she was arrested and told she had been sentenced to five years in prison, but not "when this prosecution took place, under what charges, and based on what evidence". In 2019, Amirsalar Davoudi was sentenced for 30 years in prison, and punished with 111 lashes for forming a news channel for attorneys on a messaging app. In May 2020, A human rights lawyer, Payam Derafshan, was sentenced to two years imprisonment and suspended from practicing law for a period of two additional years. Human rights activist Farshid Hakki went missing on 17 October 2018 and was later found dead. According to the Human Rights Watch, journalists and human rights defenders, including the staff of Human Rights Watch, have faced online harassment by Iran-funded troll armies that try to distract people from the human rights abuses committed by the government. Female activists are often subjected to sexist harassment and threats of violence in Iran.

=== Environmental activists ===
The environmental activists were arrested by the intelligence agents on 11 March 2018. The state-run ISNA news agency reported on 21 May 2018 that security forces in south of the country have arrested 20 environmental activists, bringing the total number of environmental activists in jail to 75, as one of the lawyers of the case, Payam Dorfeshan. At least 16 environmental activists were arrested in April 2018 in Marivan, west of Iran. It has been more than three weeks that the residents of a tourist area called Samaghan Valley in Marivan, have staged a protest gathering against burying the city's waste.

On 11 April 2019 famous actor Leonardo DiCaprio sounded the alarm for the fate of Iranian ecologists currently imprisoned by the Iranian government, some may face execution. Since DiCaprio published his petition some 160.000 have signed to protest the ecologists' detainment.

=== Political freedom ===
The Islamic government has not hesitated to crush peaceful political demonstrations. The 1999 Iranian Student Protests were sparked by an attack by an estimated 400 paramilitary Hezbollah vigilantes on a student dormitory in retaliation for a small, peaceful student demonstration against the closure of the reformist newspaper, Salam earlier that day. "At least 20 people were hospitalized and hundreds were arrested," in the attack.

On 8 March 2004, the "parallel institution" of the Basij issued a violent crackdown on the activists celebrating International Women's Day in Tehran.

Political freedom has waxed and waned. Under the administration of President Mahmoud Ahmadinejad, beginning in 2005, Iran's human rights record "deteriorated markedly" according to Human Rights Watch. Months-long arbitrary detentions of "peaceful activists, journalists, students, and human rights defenders" and often charged with "acting against national security," intensified. the United Nations General Assembly expressed "deep concern" for Iran's human rights record in December 2008 Following the protests over the June 2009 presidential elections, dozens were killed, hundreds arrested – including dozens of opposition leaders – several journalists arrested or beaten.

According to a 2011 report by the UN special rapporteur on human rights in Iran, human rights abuses in the Islamic Republic appeared to be increasing, and hundreds of prisoners were secretly executed. Iran's deputy ambassador to the United Nations condemned the report.

In mid-November 2018 United Nations' General Assembly's Human Rights Committee approved a resolution against Iranian government's continuous discrimination against women and limitation of freedom of thought.

=== Protests ===
Between 2010 and 2020 there were several public protests in Iran criticizing the government of the Islamic including the 2017–2018 Iranian protests, the 2018–2019 Iranian general strikes and protests, the 2018 protests in Iran, August 2018 uprising in Iran, and 2018 Iranian protest movement. The 2019 protests in Iran were also a series of protests criticizing the Islamic Republic of Iran government.

In 2009, protests such as Ashura protests took place criticizing alleged voting fraud and irregularities. Also the 2011–2012 Iranian protests were a series of demonstrations against corruption and alleged electoral fraud during 2009 elections.

In 2018, shortage of drinking water in Iranian provinces led to the 2018 Iranian water protests. The Ukraine International Airlines Flight 752 protests criticized the shoot down of Ukraine International Airlines Flight 752 and its subsequent denial by the Iranian Government.

==== 2009 election protests ====
Dozens were reportedly killed and thousands arrested following the June 2009 elections. Human rights workers and international observers put the estimated dead at well over 100. Reports of abuse of detainees include "detainees being beaten to death by guards in overcrowded, stinking holding pens." Detainees "fingernails ripped off or ... forced to lick filthy toilet bowls." Among those killed in detention was Mohsen Rouhalamini, the son of an adviser to the conservative presidential candidate Mohsen Rezaee. In response to complaints President Ahmadinejad issued a letter that called for "Islamic mercy" for detainees, and supreme leader Ali Khamenei intervened to close the "especially notorious" Kahrizak detention center.

In late November 2018, a group of UN human rights experts including Javid Rehman, a U.N. Special rapporteur on the situation of human rights in Iran, expressed concern about Farhad Meysami's, hunger strike, which began in August of that year. He is imprisoned for opposing compulsory hijab.

==== 2022 Iranian protests ====
On 16 September 2022, a 22-year-old Iranian, Mahsa Amini, died in a hospital in Tehran, following her arrest by the Guidance Patrol, (the religious morality police), for not wearing the hijab in accordance with government standards. According to eyewitnesses, including women who were detained with Amini, she was severely beaten, and died as a result of police brutality. These assertions, in addition to leaked medical scans, led independent observers to believe Amini had had a cerebral hemorrhage or stroke. (Iranian authorities maintain that before transferring her to the hospital, she had a heart attack at a police station, collapsed, and fell into a coma.)

Her death started a series of protests that spread from Amini's hometown of Saqqez to other cities in the province of Kurdistan and throughout the country. The government responded with widespread internet blackouts, nationwide restrictions on social media usage, tear gas and gunfire. as of 29 November 2022 at least 448 people, including 60 minors, had been killed as a result of the government's intervention in the protests; (Note: (according to the non-profit organization Iran Human Rights)) an estimated 18,170 have been arrested (Note: (according to HRANA, as of 25 November)) throughout 134 cities and towns, and at 132 universities. (Note: (according to HRANA))

==== 2025–2026 Iranian protests ====
Beginning on 28 December 2025, demonstrations erupted across multiple cities in Iran amid nationwide unrest against the Islamic Republic government and a deepening economic crisis. The protests escalated dramatically in early January 2026.Security forces responded with widespread lethal force, resulting in mass killings, particularly on 8-9 January 2026. This event has been the largest uprising since the 1979 Islamic Revolution. The ensuing crackdown, carried out under Ali Khamenei's and senior officials' order for live fire on protesters, resulted in massacres that left thousands of protesters dead, making them some of the largest massacres in modern Iranian history.

=== LGBT issues ===
In Iran, homosexual acts can be punished by execution. Death penalty

Homosexual acts and adultery are criminal and punishable by life imprisonment or death after multiple offenses, and the same sentences apply to convictions for treason and apostasy. Those accused by the state of homosexual acts are routinely flogged and threatened with execution. Iran is one of seven countries in the world that apply the death penalty for homosexual acts; all of them justify this punishment with Islamic law. The Judiciary does not recognize the concept of sexual orientation, and thus from a legal standpoint there are no homosexuals or bisexuals, only heterosexuals committing homosexual acts.

For some years after the Iranian Revolution, transgender people were classified by the Judiciary as being homosexual and were thus subject to the same laws. However, in the mid-1980s the Judiciary began changing this policy and classifying transgender individuals as a distinct group, separate from homosexuals, granting them legal rights. Gender dysphoria is officially recognized in Iran today, and the Judiciary permits sexual reassignment surgery for those who can afford it. In the early 1960s, Ayatollah Khomeini had issued a ruling permitting gender reassignment, which has since been reconfirmed by Ayatollah Khamenei.

Official figures place Iran's transgender population at roughly 15,000 to 20,000, while unofficial estimates suggest the number may be substantially higher. The country performs more gender reassignment surgeries than any other state except Thailand, following a religious ruling issued by Ayatollah Ruhollah Khomeini after the 1979 revolution that permitted such procedures. Within Iran's legal and religious framework, gender transition is treated as a medical condition, in contrast to homosexuality, which remains criminalised.

Although the authorities have tended to avoid public emphasis on this policy, state involvement expanded during the presidency of Mahmoud Ahmadinejad. Financial assistance was introduced in the form of grants to help cover surgery and hormone treatment, alongside proposed loans intended to support post transition economic integration, including starting small businesses.

=== Gender inequality ===
Unequal value for women's testimony compared to that of a man, and traditional attitudes towards women's behavior and clothing as a way of explaining rape have made conviction for rape of women difficult if not impossible in Iran. One widely criticized case was that of Atefah Sahaaleh, who was executed by the state for 'inappropriate sexual relations', despite evidence she was most probably a rape victim. Women like Atefah were considered subjugates and properties of men in Iran.

Differences in blood money for men and women include victims and offenders. In 2003, the parents of Leila Fathi, an 11-year-old village girl from Sarghez who was raped and murdered, were asked to come up with the equivalent of thousands of US dollars to pay the blood money (diyya) for the execution of their daughter's killers because a woman's life is worth half that of a man's life.

Iran elected not to become a member of the UN Convention on the Elimination of All Forms of Discrimination Against Women (CEDAW) in 2003, since the convention contradicted the Islamic Sharia law in Clause A of its single article. "Discriminatory provisions" against women in criminal and civil laws in Iran were declared "in urgent need of reform," and gender-based violence "widespread" by UN Secretary-General Ban Ki-moon in a report released 20 October 2008.

=== Religious freedom ===
==== Baháʼí issues ====
The United Nations, Amnesty International, the European Union, the United States, have stated that the members of the Baháʼí community in Iran have been subjected to unwarranted arrests, false imprisonment, beatings, torture, unjustified executions, confiscation and destruction of property owned by individuals and the Baháʼí community, denial of employment, denial of government benefits, denial of civil rights and liberties, and denial of access to higher education. Amnesty International and others report that 202 followers of the Baháʼí Faith have been killed since the Islamic Revolution, with many more imprisoned, expelled from schools and workplaces, denied various benefits or denied registration for their marriages. Iranian Baháʼís have also regularly had their homes ransacked or been banned from attending university or holding government jobs, and several hundred have received prison sentences for their religious beliefs, most recently for participating in study circles. Baháʼí cemeteries have been desecrated and property seized and occasionally demolished, including the House of Mírzá Buzurg, Bahá'u'lláh's father. The House of the Báb in Shiraz has been destroyed twice, and is one of three sites to which Baháʼís perform pilgrimage.

The Islamic Republic has often stated that arrested Baháʼís are being detained for "security issues" and are members of "an organized establishment linked to foreigners, the Zionists in particular." Bani Dugal, the principal representative of the Baháʼí International Community to the United Nations, replies that "the best proof" that Baháʼís are being persecuted for their faith, not for anti-Iranian activity "is the fact that, time and again, Baháʼís have been offered their freedom if they recant their Baháʼí beliefs and convert to Islam ..."

==== Jewish issues ====
Jews have lived in Iran for nearly 3,000 years and Iran is host to the largest Jewish community in the Middle East outside of Israel. An estimated 25,000 Jews remain in the country, although approximately 75% of Iran's Jewish population has emigrated during and since the Islamic revolution of 1979 and Iran-Iraq war In the early days after the Islamic revolution in 1979, several Jews were executed on charges of Zionism and relations with Israel. Jews in Iran have constitutional rights equal to other Iranians, although they may not hold government jobs or become army officers. They have freedom to follow their religion, but are not granted the freedom to proselytize. Despite their small numbers, Jews are allotted one representative in parliament.

Iran's official government-controlled media published the Protocols of the Elders of Zion in 1994 and 1999. Jewish children still attend Jewish schools where Hebrew and religious studies are taught, but Jewish principals have been replaced by Muslim ones, the curricula are government-supervised, and the Jewish Sabbath is no longer recognized. According to Jewish journalist Roger Cohen:

Perhaps I have a bias toward facts over words, but I say the reality of Iranian civility toward Jews tells us more about Iran – its sophistication and culture – than all the inflammatory rhetoric. That may be because I'm a Jew and have seldom been treated with such consistent warmth as in Iran.

Cohen's depiction of Jewish life in Iran sparked criticism from columnists and activists such as Jeffrey Goldberg of The Atlantic Monthly and Rafael Medoff, director of the David S. Wyman Institute for Holocaust Studies. In his Jerusalem Post op-ed, Medoff criticized Cohen for being "misled by the existence of synagogues" and further argued that Iranian Jews "are captives of the regime, and whatever they say is carefully calibrated not to get themselves into trouble." The American Jewish Committee also criticized Cohen's articles. Dr. Eran Lerman, director of the group's Middle East directory, argued that "Cohen’s need to argue away an unpleasant reality thus gives rise to systematic denial". Cohen responded on 2 March, defending his observations and further elaborating that "Iran’s Islamic Republic is no Third Reich redux. Nor is it a totalitarian state." He also stated that "life is more difficult for them [the Jews] than for Muslims, but to suggest they [Jews] inhabit a totalitarian hell is self-serving nonsense."

==== Sunni issues ====
Sunnis have complained of lack of Sunnis (who make up around 9% of Iran's population) in the judiciary, heading provincial departments in Sunni-majority regions, in the Supreme Cultural Revolution Council or the Expediency Council. In 2013 Sunni Muslims complained of plainclothes security forces preventing them from gathering and praying in prayer sites (Sadeghiyeh Mosque in northwest Tehran, Saadatabad, in northern Tehran) on Eid, insisting they show "unity" and join Shia in prayer, "despite significant differences in ritual".

==== Non-governmental Muslim Shia issues ====
Muslim clerical opponents of the Islamic Republic's political system have not been spared imprisonment. According to an analyst quoted by Iran Press Service, "hundreds of clerics have been arrested, some defrocked, other left the ranks of the religion on their own, but most of them, including some popular political or intellectual figures such as Hojjatoleslam Abdollah Noori, a former Interior Minister or Hojjatoleslam Yousefi Eshkevari, an intellectual, or Hojjatoleslam Mohsen Kadivar", are "middle rank clerics."

In 1988, Ayatollah Montazeri argued that post-revolutionary Iran was not being ruled as an Islamic state, also criticizing the blanket authorization to mass execute political prisoners in 1988. Iranian authorities viewed Montazeri's criticism as defending "'the liberals' – a code word for those who espoused Western ideas and criticism of the Islamic Republic." Montazeri later ceased being the designated successor to the Ayatollah Khomeini and "became persona non grata with the revolutionary regime", with authorities ordering his picture to be removed from mosques and government offices.

Hossein Kazemeyni Boroujerdi, a former Iranian Twelver Shi'i Muslim Ayatollah and cleric, was jailed in 2007 by the Iranian government for his criticisms of supreme leader Ali Khamenei.

Mostafa Tajzadeh, a former deputy interior minister and critic of the Iranian government, was sentenced to five years in prison in 2009. Abolfazl Ghadyani and Abdollah Nouri have also faced charges for criticizing the Islamic Republic. Iranian reformist Faezeh Hashemi also faced backlash during this period for criticizing the Islamic Revolutionary Guard Corps.

Persecuted scholars in Iran

Below is a partial list of ayatollahs that have been and/or are being persecuted in post-1979 Iran for their opposition to the ruling regime:

- Ayatollah Sadeq Rouhani who denounced Ayatollah Montazeri, and the appointment of Montazeri by the Assembly of Experts to succeed Khomeini. Rouhani later wrote an open-letter denouncing former president Rafsanjani for the government policies that went against Shia historical and his (Sadeq Rouhani's) fatwas. These include: permitting chess as halal and permissible music, which historical Shia fatwas and Rouhani's forbid but are allowed in modern-day Iran, and Tatbir (sword self-flagellation) or Zanjeerzani (self flagellation with chains) during Day of Ashura, which Rouhani (and other Ayatollahs) approve of but are banned in modern-day Iran, put under house arrest.
- Ayatollah Hassan Tabatabaei Qomi, put under house arrest for voicing his opposition to the Iran–Iraq War and denouncing the Supreme Leader Ali Khamenei, killed.
- Ayatollah Taqi Tabatabaei Qomi, driven into exile for denouncing Ali Khamenei.
- Ayatollah Kazem Shariatmadari, for his alleged role in a coup to topple the government in 1982 and denouncing the Supreme Leader Ruhollah Khomeini, put under house arrest, tortured and killed.
- Ayatollah Mohammad Taher Shubayr Khaghani, for denouncing Ruhollah Khomeini, killed. His family was driven into exile.
- Ayatollah Hossein Ali Montazeri, for denouncing Ruhollah Khomeini and then Ali Khamenei, under house arrest.
- Ayatollah Ya'sub al-Din Rastgari, for his book criticizing Sunni Islam and Shia-Sunni "unity". Work resulted in riots in Iran's Sunni areas in 1994. He also denounced Ali Khamenei, imprisoned on-and-off since 1996, tortured and put under house arrest.
- Ayatollah Mohammad al-Husayni al-Shirazi, for his opposition to the Iran–Iraq War and denouncing Ruhollah Khomeini and then Ali Khamenei, put under house arrest, later killed.
- Ayatollah Sadiq Hussaini Shirazi, for denouncing Ali Khamenei, under house arrest.
- Ayatollah Mujtaba Hussaini Shirazi, for denouncing Ali Khamenei, driven into exile.
- Ayatollah Mohammed Reza Shirazi, for denouncing Ali Khamenei, killed.
- Ayatollah Hossein Kazemeyni Boroujerdi, for denouncing Ali Khamenei, imprisoned on-and-off since 1994.
- Ayatollah Yousef Saanei, for denouncing Ali Khamenei, under house arrest.
- Ayatollah Ahmad Khonsari, for denouncing Ruhollah Khomeini, his student, put under house arrest.
- Ayatollah Yasubedin Rastegar Jooybari, for denouncing Ali Khamenei, under house arrest.
- Ayatollah Ahmad Azari Qomi, for denouncing Ali Khamenei, under house arrest.
- Ayatollah Mehdi Haeri Yazdi, a student of Khomeini but also of Western philosophy, his "stand against Khomeini's political theory and other policies resulted" in his being placed under house arrest from 1980 to 1983.

==== Dervish issues ====
Iran's Dervish are a persecuted minority. As late as the early 1900s, wandering Dervishes were a common sight in Iran. They are now much fewer in number and suffer from official opposition to the Sufi religion.

From May to August 2018, revolutionary courts sentenced "at least 208 members" of the Dervish Sufi minority "to prison terms and other punishments in trials that violate their basic rights", according to Human Rights Watch.

==== Irreligious people ====
According to the official Iranian census from 2006 there has been 205,317 irreligious people in Iran, including atheists, agnostics, sceptics. Irreligious people are also not recognized and do not have basic rights such as education, becoming member of parliament etc. According to the Iranian constitution, irreligious persons can not become president of Iran.

=== Ethnic minorities ===
Iran is a signatory to the International Convention on the Elimination of All Forms of Racial Discrimination. UNHCR found several positive aspects in the conduct of the Islamic republic with regards to ethnic minorities, positively citing its agreement to absorb Afghan refugees and participation from mixed ethnicities. However, the committee while acknowledging that teaching of minority languages and literature in schools is permitted, requested that Iran include more information in its next periodic report concerning the measures it has adopted to enable persons belonging to minorities to have adequate opportunities to learn their mother tongue and to have it used as a medium of instruction.

=== Child recruitment ===
During the 2026 Iran war, Rahim Nadali, an IRGC official in Tehran, announced the launch of the initiative "For Iran" which recruits 12 year olds into the Basij militia for them to assist in manning "operational patrols" and checkpoints, as well as providing logistical support and performing other duties. This move contradicts Iran's commitment to abstain from the use of children in military activities under the Convention on the Rights of the Child. However, Nadali justified to move stating "Given that the age of those coming forward has dropped and they are asking to take part, we lowered the minimum age to 12". According to Al-Arabiya, from the beginning of the war, Tehran residents reported of untrained teenagers and youths armed with Uzi sub-machine guns and Kalshnikov rifles, stopping vehicles, shouting orders, and firing warning shots into the air.

== Current situation ==
Number of executions in the Islamic Republic of Iran from 2003 to 2013 based on Ahmed Shaheed's report.

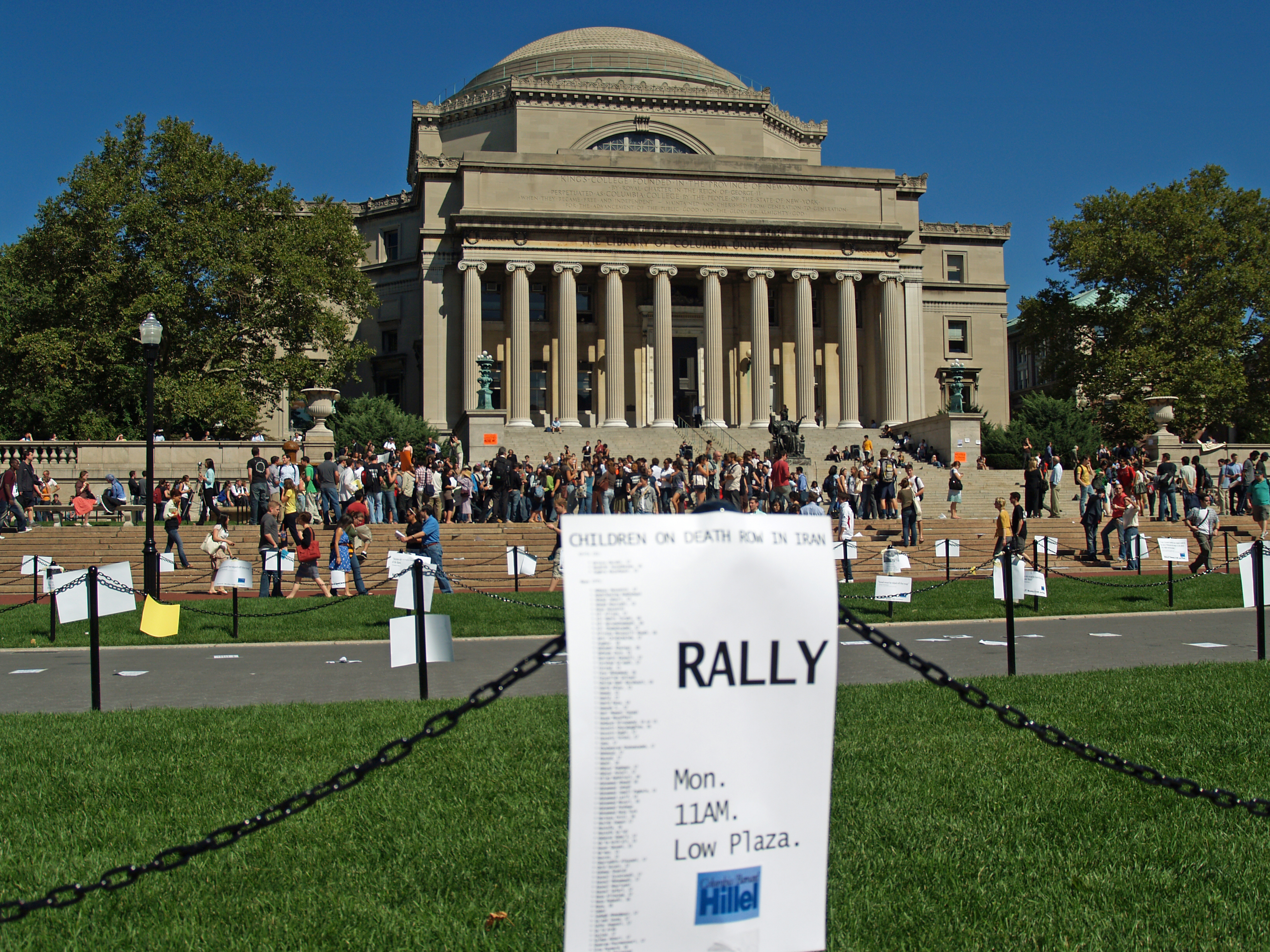
When Iranian President Mahmoud Ahmadinejad spoke at Columbia University a sign on campus noted a rally against child executions in Iran.

In May 2014 six young people in Tehran were arrested for making and posting a video in which they danced and lip-synched to the song, "Happy." The video was declared an "obscene video clip that offended the public morals and was released in cyberspace," by Tehran's police chief Hossein Sajedinia, and "vulgar" by state media. Authorities forced the young people to repent on state TV, but later released them, possibly because of public opposition to the arrests. As of 21 May 2014 the director of the video is still in custody.

In May 2020 two parkour athletes were arrested after an image of them kissing was shared online. According to Tasnim News Agency, officers said "These people were arrested by the police with the judiciary officials' command, because what they did was a sample of 'advocating vice'."

Amid escalating regional tensions and internal unrest, the Iranian government has increased repressive measures, driven by a growing sense of paranoia among the country's leadership. The government has intensified its domestic crackdown, marked by a sharp rise in executions, arbitrary detentions, and state violence. Hadi Ghaemi, executive director of the Center for Human Rights in Iran (CHRI), stated that authorities have detained individuals incommunicado, denied them access to legal representation, and carried out executions on broad "national security" charges intended to instill fear.

=== Imprisonment of foreigners for political reasons ===
Foreign nationals were arrested in Iran on numerous occasions and sentenced in show trials in order to subsequently use these hostages as political leverage against foreign countries. The detainees' confessions and interrogations were carried out, according to those released later (e.g. as part of prisoner exchanges), using torture, among other things. The condition of detention itself amounts to abuse.

Over the years, Iran has detained dual nationality citizens on unproved charges. British-Iranian aid worker Nazanin Zaghari-Ratcliffe was arrested in April 2016 and was denied a fair trial or medical assistance in prison. Despite her sentence being completed in March 2021, she hasn't been set free and is now facing a new trial. Similarly, French-Iranian researcher Fariba Adelkhah was arrested in June 2019 and was denied access to consular assistance. Similarly, French-Iranian researcher Fariba Adelkhah was arrested in June 2019 and was denied access to consular assistance.

=== Freedom of expression ===
According to Amnesty International report, after May 2006 widespread demonstrations related to Iran newspaper cockroach cartoon controversy in Iranian Azerbaijan hundreds were arrested and some "reportedly killed by the security forces, although official sources downplayed the scale of arrests and killings. Further arrests occurred, many around events and dates significant to the Azerbaijani community such as the Babek Castle gathering in Kalayber in June, and a boycott of the start of the new academic year over linguistic rights for the Azerbaijani community."

As of 2006, the Iranian government has been attempting to depoliticize Iran's student body or make it supportive of the government by stopping students that hold contrary political views from attending higher education, despite the acceptance of those students by their universities. According to Human Rights Watch, this practice has been coupled with academic suspensions, arrests, and jail terms.

According to the International Campaign for Human Rights in Iran, women's rights advocates for the One Million Signatures Campaign have been "beaten, harassed and persecuted for peacefully demonstrating" and collecting signatures on behalf of their Campaign.

According to a report by the Center for Human Rights in Iran, "the Iranian judiciary's continuing prosecution of independent lawyers under manufactured charges, where nine human rights attorneys in Iran have been arrested or disbarred in the past two years."

Some Iranian victims include:

- Hossein Kazemeyni Boroujerdi
- Mansour Osanlou, president of the executive committee of the transport workers' trade union in Tehran, was arrested in 2005, 2006, and 2007 in connection with industrial action and protest by his union.
- Mohammad Sadiq Kaboudvand
- Farzad Kamangar
- Mansour Osanloo
- Emad Baghi
- Hadi Ghabel

During Iran's 2013 presidential and local elections, dozens of opposition party members were serving prison sentences and prevented from participating. Opposition figures Mir Hossein Mousavi, Zahra Rahnavard, and Mehdi Karroubi remained under house arrest or detention as of late 2013.

Prior to the election, the unelected Guardian Council, disqualified all but eight of the more than 680 registered presidential candidates using vague criteria that enabled authorities to make sweeping and arbitrary exclusions. (Nonetheless, turnout was high and voters overwhelmingly elected moderate Hassan Rouhani.)

While authorities released at least a dozen rights activists and political opposition figures following the president's inauguration, scores of others jailed for their affiliation with banned opposition parties, labor unions, and student groups remain in prison. The judiciary continued to target independent and unregistered trade unions.

In May 2020, Iranian authorities sentenced French-Iranian academic Fariba Adelkhah to a maximum prison sentence of six years for "breaching national security and spreading propaganda against the country." The French foreign ministry said Adelkhah's arrest is "unacceptable and called on Iran to release her."

On 20 July 2020, the U.S. Embassy in Georgia stated that according to the Center for Human Rights in Iran (CHRI), nine human rights attorneys in Iran were arrested or disbarred in last two years. They were charged with national security-related crimes or banned from practicing law. The CHRI has been maintaining an updated list of lawyers known to have been imprisoned in Iran for their work defending the law.

On 16 June 2022, UN Secretary General António Guterres submitted an interim report on Iran's human rights situation. The UN has expressed concern over excessive force against dissidents and protests, including arbitrary executions, as well as arbitrary deprivation of life in detention. It also condemned Iran's execution of child offenders. Guterres also expressed concern about the potential impacts of Iran's policies aimed at increasing population growth. The report covered the period from 11 June 2021 to 20 March 2022.

==== Freedom of the press ====
In Freedom House's 2013 press freedom survey, Iran was ranked "Not Free", and among "The world’s eight worst-rated countries" (coming in 5th out of 196). According to the Reporters Without Borders World Press Freedom Index for 2020, Iran ranked 173rd out of 179 nations. "Iran has been one of the world’s most repressive countries for journalists for the past 40 years. State control of news and information is unrelenting and at least 860 journalists and citizen-journalists have been imprisoned or executed since 1979." According to the International Press Institute and Reporters Without Borders, the government of Mahmoud Ahmadinejad and the Supreme National Security Council had imprisoned 50 journalists in 2007 and had all but eliminated press freedom. RWB has dubbed Iran the "Middle East's biggest prison for journalists." 85 newspapers, including 41 dailies, were shut down from 2000 to the end of 2002 following the passing of the "April 2000 press law." In 2003, that number was nearly 100. There are currently 45 journalists in prison a number surpassed only by Turkey with 49. The "red lines" of press censorship in Iran are said to be questioning rule by clerics (velayat-e faqih) and direct attacks on the Supreme Leader. Red lines have also drawn against writing that "insults Islam", is sexually explicit, "politically subversive," or is allegedly "confusing public opinion."

Journalists are frequently warned or summoned if they are perceived as critical of the government, and topics such as U.S. relations and the country's nuclear program are forbidden subjects for reporting.

In February 2008 the journalist Yaghoob Mirnehad was sentenced to death on charges of "membership in the terrorist Jundallah group as well as crimes against national security." Mirnehad was executed on 5 July 2008.

In November 2007 freelance journalist Adnan Hassanpour received a death sentence for "undermining national security," "spying," "separatist propaganda" and being a mohareb (fighter against God). He refused to sign a confessions, and it is theorized that he was arrested for his work with US-funded radio stations Radio Farda and Voice of America. Hassanpour's sentence was overturned on 4 September 2008, by the Tehran Supreme Court. Hassanpour still faces espionage charges.

In June 2008 the Iranian Ministry of Labor stated that the 4,000 member journalists' union, founded in 1997, was "fit for dissolution."

Human rights blogger and US National Press Club honoree Kouhyar Goudarzi has twice been arrested for his reporting, most recently on 31 July 2011. He is currently in detention, and his whereabouts are unknown. Following his second arrest, Amnesty International named him a prisoner of conscience.

In 2012 the journalist Marzieh Rasouli, who writes about culture and the arts for several of Iran's reformist and independent publications including Etemaad, Roozega, and Shargh, where she edited the music pages, was arrested and accused of collaborating with the BBC. In 2014 she was convicted of "spreading propaganda" and "disturbing the public order". She was sentenced to two years in prison and 50 lashes, and reported to Evin prison on 8 July 2014.

Political satirist Kiumars Marzban was sentenced to 23 years in prison for "cooperating with an enemy state" and insulting Iranian authorities in 2019. Marzban is part of an intensified state crackdown in Iran that has resulted in harsh prison sentences for journalists, human rights lawyers, women protesting the compulsory hijab rule, labor rights activists, and others.

==== Artistic freedom ====
On 5 October 2013, Hossein Rajabian Iranian filmmaker and Mehdi Rajabian, a Composer and founder of Barg Music Company, were arrested by the Iranian security forces. They were held for Three months in Section 2A (solitary confinement) of the Evin prison. Finally on 22 December 2015 at Branch 28 court of the Tehran they were sentenced to six years in prison for "insulting the sacred" and "propaganda against the state" through artistic activity, as well as a 200 million Toman (about US$66,650) fine. In solitary confinement, they were forced to appear in a televised confession. They were held in a cell with Somali pirates as punishment in Evin Prison.

In 2003, Iranian ex-patriate director Babak Payami's film Silence Between Two Thoughts was seized by Iranian authorities, and Payami smuggled a digital copy out of Iran which was subsequently screened in several film festivals. According to experts, the "largest crackdown on Iran’s cinema industry in recent years" took place in May 2022. This included the raiding and arrests of industry people and filmmakers living in Iran.

==== Political freedom ====
On 28 February 2008, Amnesty International called on the Iranian government "to stop persecuting people" involved in the "One Million Signatures" campaign or "Campaign for Equality" – an attempt to collect one million signatures "for a petition to push for an end to discrimination against women." According to AI, "Dozens of women have been arrested," suffered harassment, intimidation and imprisonment. One campaigner, Delaram Ali, 23, "was sentenced to nearly three years in prison and 10 lashes for participation in an illegal gathering". Her punishment has been suspended while her case is re-examined.

Blogger and political activist Samiye Tohidlou was sentenced to 50 lashes for her activities during protests at the 2009 presidential campaign. Activist Peyman Aref was sentenced to 74 lashes for writing an "insulting" open letter to President Ahmadinejad, in which he criticised the president's crackdown on politically active students. An unnamed Iranian journalist based in Tehran commented: "Lashing Aref for insulting Ahmadinejad is shocking and unprecedented."

==== Freedom of movement ====
On 8 May 2007 Haleh Esfandiari an Iranian American scholar in Iran visiting her 93-year-old mother, was detained in Evin Prison and kept in solitary confinement for more than 110 days. She was one of several visiting Iranian Americans prohibited from leaving Iran in 2007. In December 2008, the presidents of the American National Academy of Sciences issued a warning to "American scientists and academics" against traveling to Iran without 'clear assurances' that their personal safety 'will be guaranteed and that they will be treated with dignity and respect', after Glenn Schweitzer, who has coordinated the academies' programs in Iran for the past decade, was detained and interrogated.

==== Internet freedom ====
The Internet has grown faster in Iran than any other Middle Eastern country (aside from Israel) since 2000 but the government has censored dozens of websites it considers "non-Islamic" and harassed and imprisoned online journalists. In 2006 and again in 2010, the activist group Reporters Without Borders labeled Iran one of the 12 or 13 countries it designated "Enemies of the Internet" for stepped up efforts to censor the Internet and jail dissidents. It is also ranked worst in "Freedom on the Net 2013 Global Scores". Reporters Without Borders also believes that it is the Iranian "government’s desire to rid the Iranian Internet of all independent information concerning the political opposition, the women’s movement and human rights". Where the government cannot legally stop sites it uses advanced blocking software to prevent access to them. Many major sites have been blocked entirely such as Google, YouTube Amazon.com, Wikipedia, IMDb, Voice of America, BBC.

On 16 November 2020, Amnesty Investigation found that Iran authorities intentionally shut down the internet during nationwide protests in November 2019, to hide the true extent of the horrendous human rights violations and actual scale of unlawful killings by security forces.

=== Deaths in custody ===
In the past few years several people have died in custody in the Islamic Republic, raising fears that "prisoners in the country are being denied medical treatment, possibly as an extra punishment." Two prisoners who died, allegedly after having "committed suicide" while in jail in northwestern Iran – but whose families reported no signs of behavior consistent with suicidal tendencies – are:

- Zahra Bani Yaghoub, (aka Zahra Bani-Ameri), a 27-year-old female physician died in October 2007 while in custody in the town of Hamedan.
- Ebrahim Lotfallahi, also 27, died in a detention center in the town of Sanandaj in January 2008. "On 15 January, officials from the detention center contacted Lotfallahi’s parents and informed them that they had buried their son in a local cemetery."

Political prisoners who recently died in prison under "suspicious circumstances" include:

- Akbar Mohammadi, a student activist, died in Evin prison on 30 July 2006, after waging a hunger strike. Originally sentenced to death for his participation in the pro-democracy July 1999 student riots, his sentence had been reduced to 15 years in prison. "Several sources told Human Rights Watch that after his arrest in 1999, Mohammadi was severely tortured and ill-treated, leading to serious health problems."
- Valiullah Faiz Mahdavi, also died after starting a hunger strike when his appeal for a temporary relief from prison was denied. His cause of death was officially listed as suicide.
- Omid Reza Mir Sayafi, a blogger, died in Evin Prison 18 March 2009, less than six weeks after starting a 30-month sentence.
- Amir Hossein Heshmat Saran, died "in suspicious circumstances" on 6 March 2009 after five years in prison for establishing the United National Front political party.
- Abdolreza Rajabi (1962-2008) was a member of the People's Mojahedin Organization of Iran (PMOI), who died unexpectedly in Reja'i Shahr Prison on 30 October 2008. He was transferred from Evin to Raja’i Shahr Prison before the news of his death was announced.

On 24 November 2020, According to Amnesty International, Iran authorities should halt the execution of Ahmad Reza Djalali an Iranian-Swedish specialist in emergency medicine. Authorities has been transferred Djalali to solitary confinement in Evin prison and told by the prosecution authorities that his death sentence will be carried out imminently.

=== Freedom of religion ===
==== Baháʼí issues ====
Around 2005 the situation for followers of the Baháʼí Faith is reported to have worsened; the United Nations Commission on Human Rights revealed an October 2005 confidential letter from Command Headquarters of the Armed Forces of Iran to identify Baháʼís and to monitor their activities and in November 2005 the state-run and influential Kayhan newspaper, whose managing editor is appointed by Iran's supreme leader, Ayatollah Khamenei, ran nearly three dozen articles defaming the Baháʼí Faith.

Due to these actions, the Special Rapporteur of the United Nations Commission on Human Rights stated on 20 March 2006 that she "also expresses concern that the information gained as a result of such monitoring will be used as a basis for the increased persecution of, and discrimination against, members of the Baháʼí faith, in violation of international standards. … The Special Rapporteur is concerned that this latest development indicates that the situation with regard to religious minorities in Iran is, in fact, deteriorating."

In March and in May 2008, "senior members" forming the leadership of the Baháʼí community in Iran were arrested by officers from the Ministry of Intelligence and taken to Evin prison. They have not been charged, and they seem to be prisoners of conscience. The Iran Human Rights Documentation Center has stated that they are concerned for the safety of the Baháʼís, and that the recent events are similar to the disappearance of 25 Baháʼí leaders in the early 1980s.

==== Muslim Shia issues ====
One opponent of theocracy, Ayatollah Hossein Kazemeyni Boroujerdi and many of his followers were arrested in Tehran on 8 October 2006. As of 2015 Boroujerdi is in the ninth year of an 11-year prison sentence and despite "multiple health complications, including heart and respiratory problems and kidney stone complications and vision loss from cataracts", is being denied medical care.

==== Christian issues ====
Converts to Christianity and their supporters have faced the death penalty for apostasy, been tortured or been murdered in suspicious circumstances. Mehdi Dibaj and Haik Hovsepian Mehr are notable examples.

There are also increasingly strong prohibitions on evangelising Moslems. Threats, arrests, prison and torture are common not only for Christians, but for opponents of the regime.

Viscount Brentford, House of Lords, in response to the alleged murder of Bishop Haik Hovsepian-Mehr, 3 March 1994

=== Ethnic issues ===
According to Amnesty International's 2007 report, "Ethnic and religious minorities" in the Islamic Republic "remained subject to discriminatory laws and practices which continued to be a source of social and political unrest". International organizations and the United Nations petitioned unsuccessfully for a Baluchi prisoner named Javid Dehghan who had been convicted of murder and terrorism along with appeals for other ethnic minority prisoners in late 2020.

=== Gender inequality ===
==== Compulsory hijab ====
In Spring 2007, Iranian police launched a crackdown against women accused of not covering up enough, arresting hundreds of women, some for wearing too tight an overcoat or letting too much hair showing from their headscarves. The campaign in the streets of major cities is the toughest such crackdown since the Islamic revolution. More than one million Iranians (mostly women) have been arrested in the past year (May 2007 – May 2008) for violating the state dress code according to a May 2008 NBC Today Show report by Matt Lauer.

"Guidance Patrols" (gasht-e ershâd) — often referred to as "religious police" in Western media – enforce Islamic moral values and dress codes. Reformist politicians have criticized the unpopular patrols but the patrols 'interminable' according to Iranian judicial authorities who have pointed out that in the Islamic Republic the president does not have control over the enforcement of dress codes.

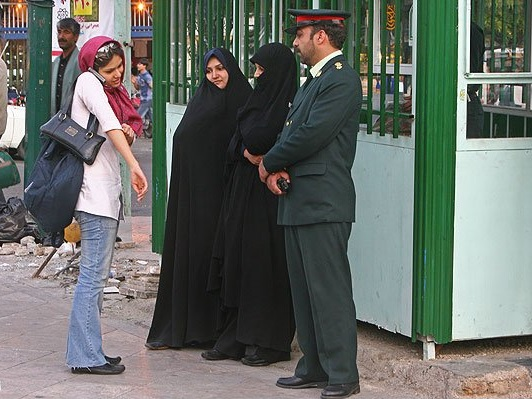
Three police warn a woman to cover her forearms.

On 1 October 2023, Armita Geravand, a 16-year-old Iranian girl, fell into a coma after an alleged altercation with morality police regarding her hijab. She is now declared "brain dead." Her case draws comparisons to Mahsa Amini, who died in custody in 2022 after a hijab-related arrest. Protests have erupted, and two journalists, Niloufar Hamedi and Elaheh Mohammadi, received prison sentences for reporting on Amini's death.

==== Restricting women from attending certain universities ====
In August 2012, following years in which Iranian women students have outperformed Iranian male students, 36 universities announced that 77 BA and BSc courses would be "single gender" and not co-ed. Under this policy, undergraduate women are excluded from a wide variety of studies in those universities, including English literature, English translation, hotel management, archaeology, nuclear physics, computer science, electrical engineering, industrial engineering, and business management. Shirin Ebadi, an Iranian Nobel laureate and human rights lawyer exiled in the United Kingdom, wrote to United Nations Secretary General Ban Ki-moon and High Commissioner for Human Rights Navi Pillay over the move, saying that Iran's true agenda was to lower the proportion of female students from 65% to below 50%, which would weaken Iran's feminist movement in its campaign against discriminatory Islamic laws. Some Iranian parliamentarians have also criticized the new policy.

==== Restricting women from attending stadiums ====
There is no written law that restricts women's presence in stadiums, yet a handful of Ayatollahs impose Taliban style restrictions on basic women's rights such as attending football stadiums. As a result, an Iranian woman named Sahar Khodayari (also known as the "Blue Girl") self-immolated and died on 11 September 2019 protesting the unjustified court ruling that sentenced her to six months in jail just for trying to watch her favorite team's match in Azadi Stadium of Tehran.

Iranian authorities prevented dozens of Iranian women from entering Imam Reza Stadium in the city of Mashhad on 29 March 2022. The authorities used pepper spray and excessive force to disperse the women gathered in front of the stadium.

=== Child executions in Iran ===
Iran "leads the world in executing juvenile offenders – persons under 18 at the time of the crime" according to Human Rights Watch. International Campaign for Human Rights in Iran states that of the 32 executions of juvenile offenders that have taken place in the world since January 2005, 26 occurred in Iran. In 2007 Iran executed eight juvenile offenders. In July of that year, Amnesty International issued a comprehensive 46-page report titled Iran: The last executioner of children noting Iran had executed more children between 1990 and 2005 than any other state.

Iran is a party to the International Covenant on Civil and Political Rights (ICCPR) and the convention on the Rights of the Child (CRC). Article 6.5 of the International Covenant on Civil and Political Rights (ICCPR) declares: "Sentence of death shall not be imposed for crimes committed by persons below eighteen years of age" and the article 37(a) of the convention on the Rights of the Child (CRC) provides that: "Neither capital punishment nor life imprisonment without possibility of release shall be imposed for offenses committed by persons below eighteen years of age".

In January 2005, the UN Committee on the Rights of the Child, which monitors states' compliance with the CRC, urged Iran to immediately stay all executions of child offenders and to abolish the use of the death penalty in such cases. In the summer of 2006, the Iranian Parliament reportedly passed a bill establishing special courts for children and adolescents. However, it has not yet been approved by the Council of Guardians, which supervises Iran's legislation to ensure conformity with Islamic principles. During the past four years, the Iranian authorities have reportedly been considering legislation to ban the death penalty for child offenders. Recent comments by a judiciary spokesperson indicates that the proposed law would only prohibit the death penalty for certain crimes, and not all crimes committed by children.

In spite of these efforts, the number of child offenders executed in Iran has risen during the past two years. As of July 2008, Stop Child Executions Campaign has recorded over 130 children facing executions in Iran.

In late 2007, Iranian authorities hanged Makwan Mouludzadeh in Kermanshah prison for crimes he is alleged to have committed when he was 13 years of age. According to Human Rights Watch, this was despite the fact that his accusers had recanted their statements and Mouladzadeh had repudiated his confession as being coerced by the police, and despite the fact that the head of Iran's judiciary, Ayatollah Shahrudi, had ordered a unit of the Judiciary to investigate the case and refer it back to the Penal Court of Kermanshah, before any final decision on an execution.

A 2004 case that gained international attention was the hanging of 16-year-old school girl Atefah Sahaaleh.

On 27 June 2018, a teenager named Abolfazl Chezani Sharahi executed at Qom Prison. He was sentenced to death in 2014 on charge of murder while he was 14 years old.

=== Significant activists ===
The following individuals represent a partial list of individuals who are currently, or have in the past, significantly attempted to improve the human rights situation in Iran after the revolution in 1979.

- Shirin Ebadi
- Nasrin Sotoudeh
- Akbar Ganji
- Mehrangiz Kar
- Emad Baghi
- Abdolfattah Soltani
- Mohammad Ali Dadkhah

Alireza Shir Mohammad Ali was arrested after anti-government protests in 2018. He was subsequently sentenced to eight years in prison on charges of "blasphemy, insulting the former and current leader, and propaganda against the regime".

=== Organizations ===
Iran has an Islamic Human Rights Commission, but it is "housed in a government building and headed by the chief of the judiciary," and is not considered to be particularly concerned with human rights abuses, according to Nobel peace prize laureate and founder of Defenders of Human Rights Center Shirin Ebadi.

Other human rights organisations based in Iran or run by the Iranian diaspora include:

- in Iran
  - Mothers of Khavaran
- Iranian diaspora
  - Center for Human Rights in Iran
  - Hengaw (Kurdish: هەنگاو) or Hengaw Organization for Human Rights (Kurdish: Dezgehe Mafê Mirovan a Hengawê, ڕێکخراوی هەنگاو بۆ مافەکانی مرۆڤ, Persian: سازمان حقوق بشری هنگاو) is a non-governmental organization registered in Norway. It focuses on reporting and documenting human rights violations in Iran, especially those perpetrated against its Kurdish minority. Hengaw was founded in 2020. Their reporting on the treatment of Kolbars has been used by the United Nations. Since 2022, their reporting on the crackdown of protesters in Iranian Kurdistan during the Mahsa Amini protests in 2022 has been used by various international media outlets. Hengaw reported the death of Armita Geravand in 2023. Members of Hengaw have reportedly been threatened by elements of the Iranian security apparatus while located outside of Iran, and their families inside Iran have been arrested. The report by Hengaw at the end of 2025 showed a significant increase in human rights-related deaths compared with 2024, with at least 1,858 executions in prisons during 2025.
  - Human Rights Activists in Iran
  - International Centre for Human Rights
  - Iran Human Rights
  - Iran Human Rights Documentation Center

== See also ==
- Controversies surrounding the Islamic Revolutionary Guard Corps
- High Council for Human rights, Judiciary of Islamic Republic of Iran
- Crimes against humanity by the Islamic Republic of Iran
