= History of Iran Narrated by Setar =

Unreleased studio album by Mehdi Rajabian

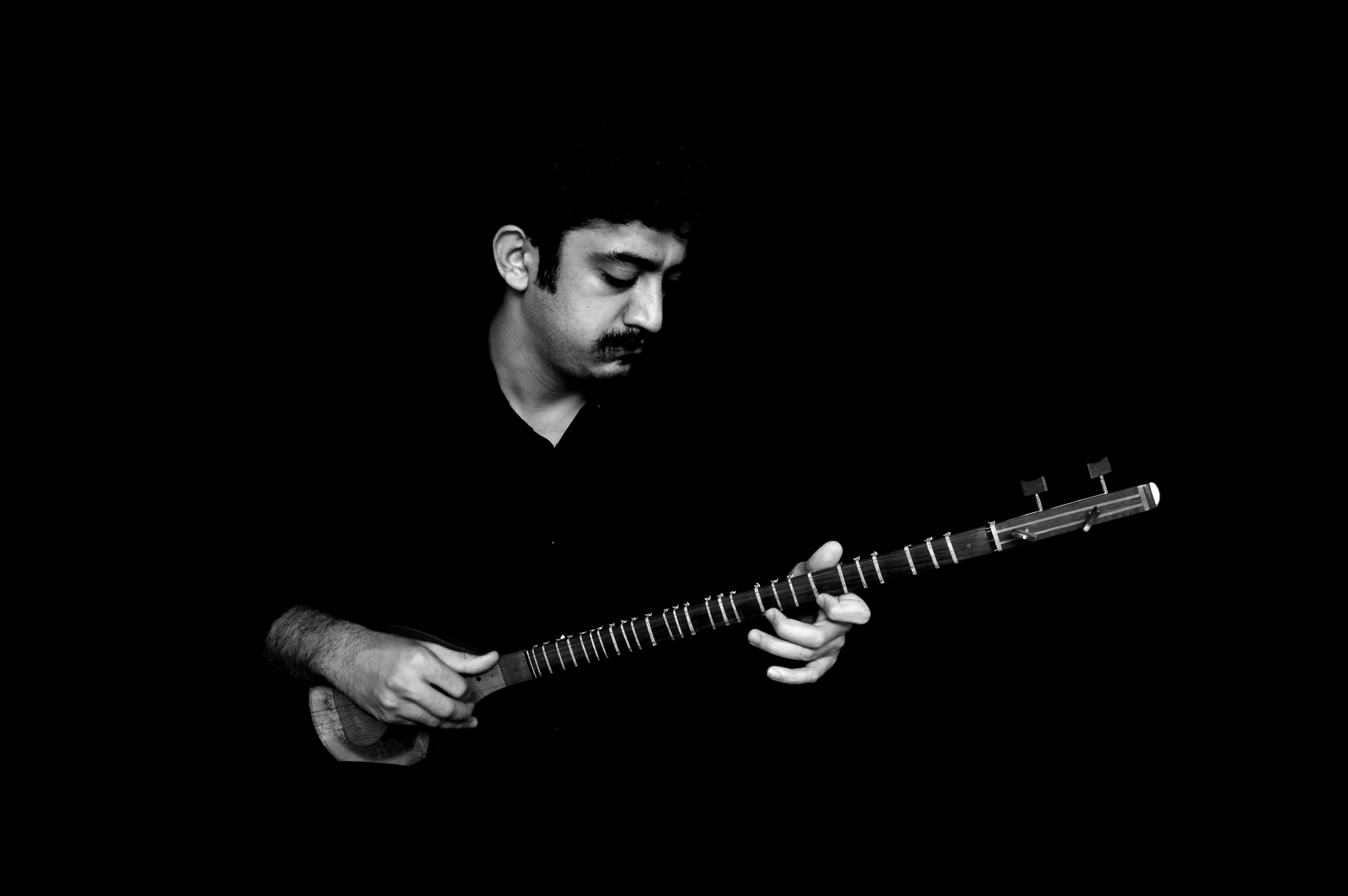
- Mehdi Rajabian playing a setar

Studio album by Mehdi Rajabian
- Released: Banned by Iranian government
- Recorded: 2011–2013
- Genre: Iranian classical music
- Label: Barg
- Producer: Mehdi Rajabian

Mehdi Rajabian chronology
History of Iran Narrated by Setar	Middle Eastern

History of Iran Narrated by Setar is an unreleased studio album by Iranian musician Mehdi Rajabian, in which he interprets his nation's history using the traditional Persian stringed instrument called a setar. Rajabian researched the sounds of different parts of Iran in order to record the album. He began recording songs for the project in 2011, but in 2013, he was arrested, and his studio hard drives were confiscated.

== Confiscation and arrest ==
On 5 October 2013, the security forces of Iran shut down Rajabian's recording studio and confiscated the hard drives containing material he had recorded. The artist was subsequently arrested, together with his brother and the studio's manager, and imprisoned. Rajabian was eventually charged with producing and distributing unlicensed music and "spreading propaganda against the regime".
