= Rajabian =

Rajabian is a Persian surname. Notable people with the surname include:

- Hossein Rajabian (born 1984), Iranian filmmaker, writer and photographer
- Mehdi Rajabian (born 1989), Iranian composer and musician
