= Cartoon Campaign for Freedom =

- Purpose: Political campaign
- Owner: United Sketches

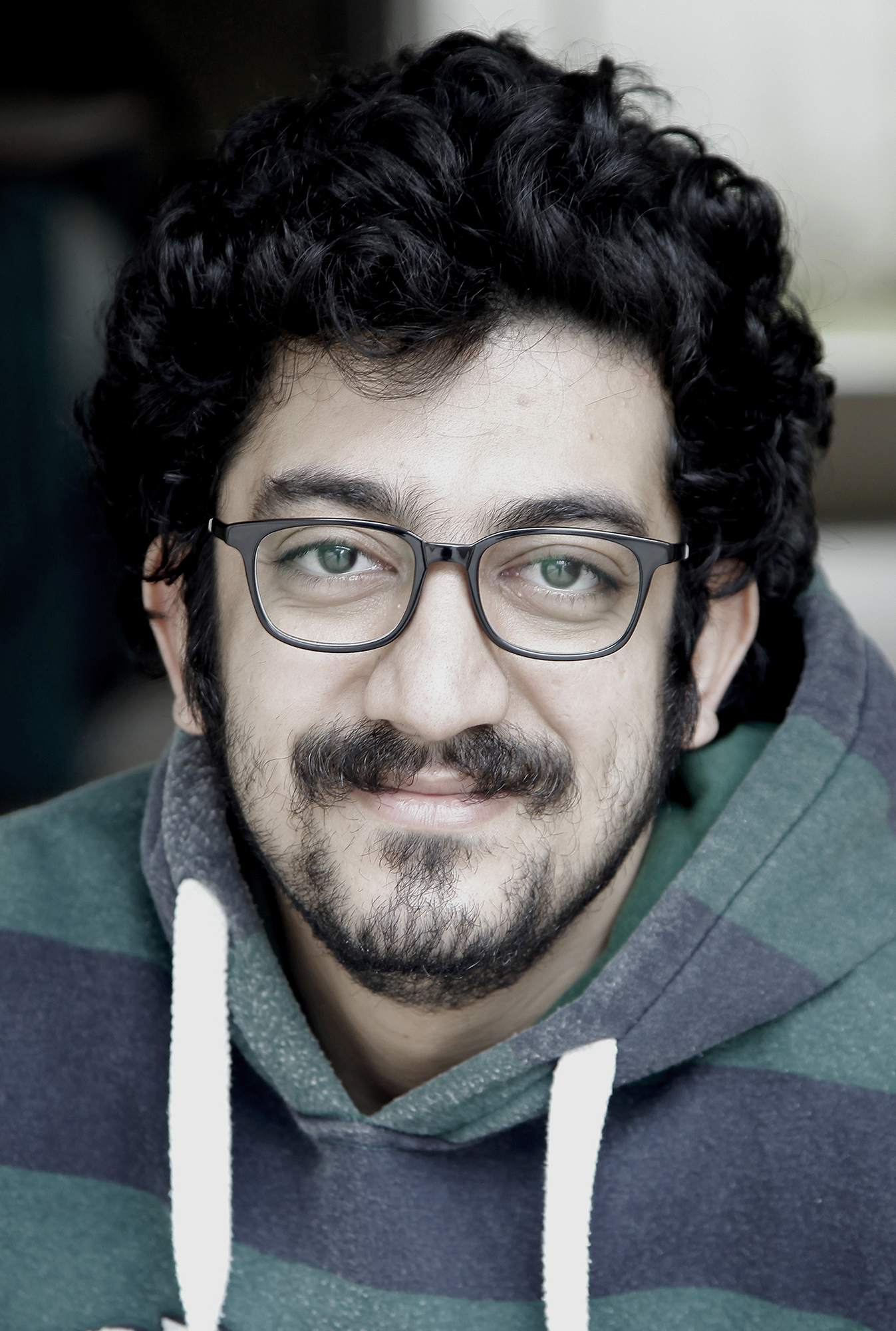
Mehdi Rajabian, who was sentenced to prison for his music activities

Cartoon Campaign for Freedom is a campaign started in 2016 by the French organisation United Sketches for the freedom of Mehdi Rajabian, the artist and musician who was sentenced to three years imprisonment for his artistic activities.

The campaign invited cartoonists from around the world to draw a cartoon in support of Rajabian and to picture their time in Evin Prison. Some well-known and prominent artists and cartoonists joined the campaign, including the Russian cartoonist Victor Bogorad.
