= Coup of Gods =

Studio album by Mehdi Rajabian
- Released: 17 September 2021
- Genre: World music
- Length: 34:31
- Label: Harvey Mason Jr. - Hundredup

Coup of Gods is a 2021 album by Iranian composer and arranger Mehdi Rajabian. The album was released 17 September 2021 in the United States.

The album was developed with assistance from an international team, including Ukrainian director Roman Honcharenko. Together, Rajabian and Honcharenko created an unconventional teaser trailer that generated significant interest from the public and international media.

In August 2020, Rajabian was arrested and placed on trial. Rajabian stated that the arrest followed a media interview about the album and the charges were due to the album including vocals from female artists. Rajabian's difficulties in making the album received significant media coverage.

== Track listing ==
No.	Title	Length
1.	"Whip on a Lifeless Body"	9:10
2.	"Murmur of the Naked Nun"	10:10
3.	"An Epitaph on the Tomb of Companions"	11:11
4.	"Coup of Gods"	4:00
Total length:		34:31
