= Amir Hossein Heshmat Saran =

Founder of the Iran National Unity Front political party (1960–2009)

- امیرحسین حشمت ساران
- Born: 1960; Imperial State of Iran
- Died: 6 March 2009 (aged 49)
- Cause of death: Beating in the jain and insufficient medical care provided by prison medical staff
- Occupation: Organizer of the Iran National Unity Front

Amir Hossein Heshmat Saran (Persian: امیرحسین حشمت ساران; 1960 – 6 March 2009) was the founder of the Iran National Unity Front political party. Sentenced to prison for this act he died incarcerated and is thought by some human rights groups to be one of a series of political prisoners whose deaths have "occurred as a result of insufficient medical care provided by prison medical staff".

== Life ==
In 2004, the Tehran Revolutionary Court sentenced Heshmat Saran to eight years in prison for his political activities, including participation in Iran Students' Day demonstrations, and organizing the Iran National Unity Front, (jebhe-yeh etehaad-e melli), an illegal opposition group which advocated for a more democratic Iran. At the beginning of his detention, Heshmat Saran published articles which described his experience inside the jail and with the help of members of the Iran National Unity Front, this information was distributed to websites and Iranian satellite channels in the United States. For this action, his eight-year sentence was increased to 16 years.

Later he suffered heart attacks, despite which he was not allowed to take relief time from prison. His health continued to deteriorate and in November 2008 he "fell unconscious for about six hours" in Gohardasht Prison. In March he died in Raja’i Shahr prison. According to his wife, "the medical specialist who treated him told me he had brain hemorrhaging, and a lung infection which had spread throughout his body, that he should have been brought in sooner". According to other political prisoners, his death could have been "easily been avoided had prison doctors allowed him to seek medical care outside of prison".

== See also ==
- Human rights in the Islamic Republic of Iran
