= Middle Eastern (album) =

Studio album by Mehdi Rajabian
- Released: 15 March 2019
- Recorded: March 2018, in different studios in Middle East
- Genre: Classical, Traditional Middle Eastern Folk
- Length: 40:12
- Label: Sony Music Entertainment
- Producer: Barg Music by Mehdi Rajabian

Middle Eastern is an album by the Iranian musician Mehdi Rajabian, along with a hundred musicians from twelve countries of Middle East, released by Sony Music Entertainment in March 2019. The idea for the album came to Rajabian while he was imprisoned due to his musical activities, and the album has not been released in Iran due to restrictions on him. The album is in classic and Middle Eastern form and focusses on Middle Eastern sounds, featuring traditional instruments. It has 11 tracks and is 40 minutes long.

== Publication ==
This album was published worldwide in March 2019 by Sony Music Entertainment. It was available on both physical and digital markets (such as iTunes) to buy. This album hasn't been published Iran due to the restrictions Rajabian is facing.

== Painting for pieces of music ==
Zehra Doğan, a Kurdish painter, has started her first collaboration with the album "Middle Eastern" after her release from prison. Zehra has painted for all the musical pieces of the album, each painting tells a story. For the first time, Artnet, Sky News, Financial Times News Agency has published a number of his paintings.

== Performance ==
Helia Bandeh, an Iranian-Dutch Dancer, performed a dance for one of the album tracks with the story of life and death as one of the guest members in the group. Her dance has been published exclusively by ABC News Agency.

== Cover ==
The cover of the album is a photograph by Reza Deghati. As he claimed in one of his interviews with Al Jazeera, the photograph was shot in Iraq.

== Musicians' Condition ==
The melodies of this album were created in the middle of war, vast water (as one of the musicians was a refugee escaping his country on a boat), in prison, poverty and under bombardments. Rajabian himself was in prison for two years due to his musical activities, and he wrote the initiative idea for the album then. The message this album carries is about tyranny, oppression, human rights, war, peace, and freedom.

== Reflection in media ==
News agencies such as Washington Post, Euronews, ICI, MSN, Al Jazeera, Newsweek, BBC World, etc. did cover the album. Washington Post mentioned this that music can talk about suffering and human rights, and not just for fun and politics. Newsweek labeled this album as one of the greatest albums of Middle East.

== Arrest ==
Mehdi Rajabian was arrested once again on August 11, 2020 for publishing his latest album Middle Eastern. Later on, Fox News reported that he was temporarily released on bail until his court date. As Reuters reports, Rajabian "was arrested following media reports that his latest project will include women singing and the publication of a video of a woman dancing to his music". Al Jazeera also reported that he will be on a home arrest until the court date. Music, paintings, dancing, photography, and book writing were the elements of Middle Eastern project. Musicians from all over the Middle East have participated in this project. Due to his arrest, this project was also left unfinished, just like the last ones. As for the music part of the project, the album was released by Sony Music in 2019.

== See also ==
- Concept album
- Album
