= Death of Armita Geravand =

2023 death in Tehran, Iran

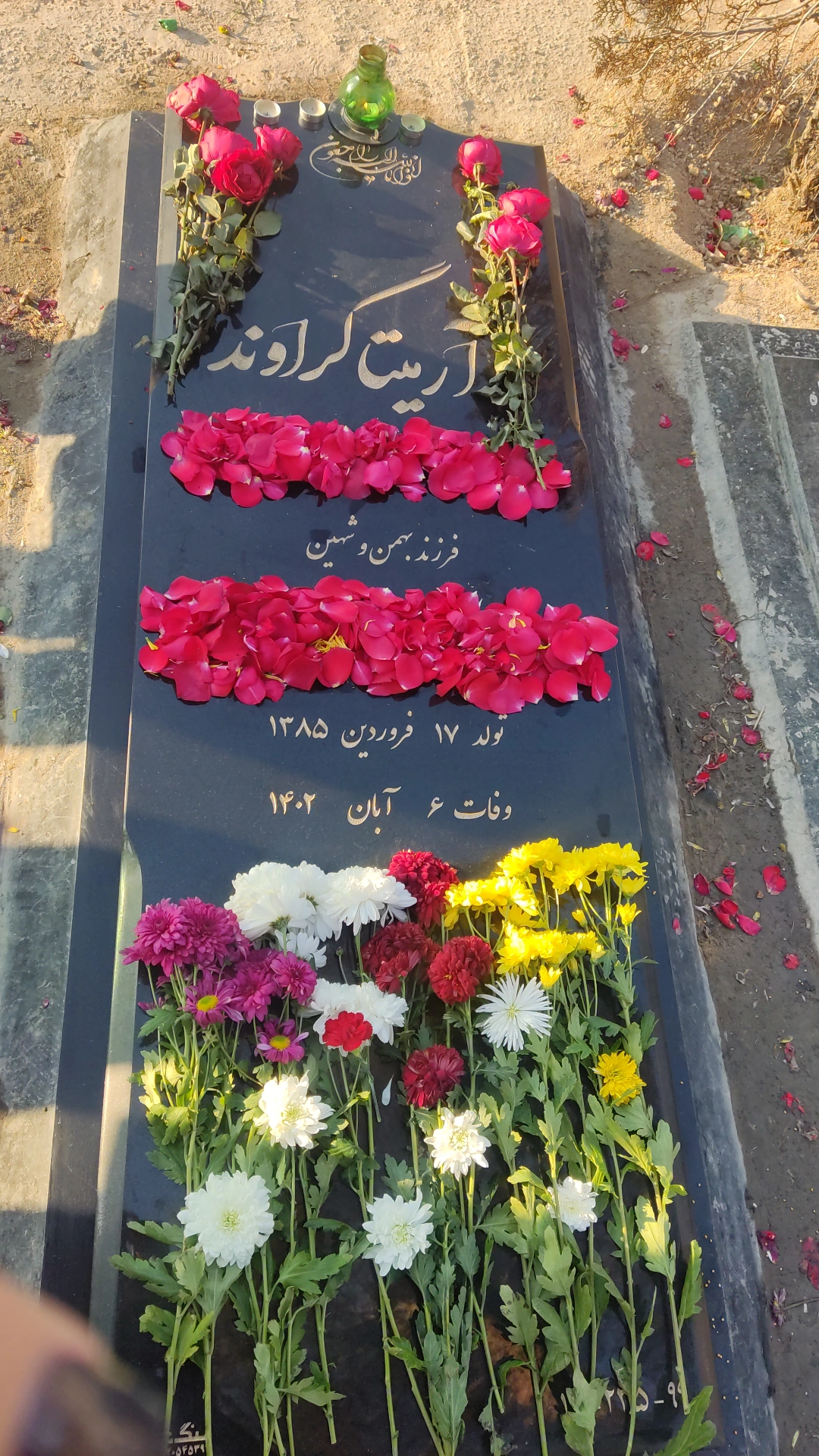
- Grave of Armita Geravand
- Date: 1 October 2023 (coma); 28 October 2023 (death)
- Venue: Tehran Metro
- Location: Tehran, Iran
- Cause: disputed

Armita Geravand (Persian: آرمیتا گراوند) was a 17-year-old Iranian girl who fell into a coma on the Tehran Metro on 1 October 2023 after an alleged encounter with officers enforcing Islamic Hijab. She was held in the intensive care unit of an Army hospital where she was declared brain dead on 22 October 2023, and pronounced dead on 28 October. This incident has been compared to the death of Mahsa Amini and called "unbearable" by the German foreign minister.

Armita was an 11th grade student at an art high school in Tehran, and a professional taekwondo athlete. She had started this sport professionally since 2013 with a "Dan 3" in the martial sport. Armita was a member of "Anahid Razm" taekwondo team in Tehran with a "Pom One" belt.

Armita was interested in Korean culture and was a fan of the Korean music group BTS. She had painted the face of Jimin, one of the main members of BTS, and imitated the style of clothing and hair of Jimin and Jungkook.

== Background ==
Geravand's family is originally from the Tarhan District in the Kuhdasht County of Lorestan province, Iran. In Iran, women are required by law to cover their hair and wear loose fitting clothes as part of strict Islamic dress codes. Those who violate these rules face public rebuke, fines, or arrest by the Guidance Patrol, also known as the morality police.

== Incident ==
On 1 October 2023, 17-year-old Armita Geravand was seen going into the Tehran Metro with two friends. Her friends then dragged her out of the train, unconscious, called for medical help, and she was taken to a hospital. She was admitted to the hospital with traumatic brain injury.

A witness claimed that soon after Geravand entered the subway car a hijab enforcer started arguing with her because she was not wearing a headscarf. The argument turned violent, and the hijab enforcer physically attacked her. According to the Tehran and Houmah Metro Company, the TWM-EM-1203 series subway car that Geravand boarded is equipped with multiple video surveillance cameras. However, Iranian news agencies have not released any footage from inside the train.

== Allegations ==
According to the Norway-based human rights group Hengaw, Geravand was confronted by morality police officers for not wearing a headscarf and, after a brief altercation, she was assaulted and fell, causing her to hit her head and lose consciousness. Iranian authorities have denied any physical confrontation took place and claim she fainted due to low blood pressure.

Security camera footage from the metro station shows Geravand entering the train without a headscarf along with two other girls. Moments later, she is carried off the train unconscious by her friends. Iran's state media claims this footage proves their narrative but does not show the events inside the train car leading up to Geravand's coma. An analysis from Amnesty International's evidence laboratory alleges that the video was sped up in multiple sections and that, based on time stamps, there is a gap of 3 minutes and 16 seconds in the footage.

== Aftermath ==
Geravand's mother and a journalist for the daily newspaper Shargh who was interviewing her were arrested. The intensive care unit of the hospital where Geravand was taken was guarded by security agents.

On 22 October, Iran's state media announced that Geravand had been declared brain dead after being in a coma for several weeks. On 28 October, she was pronounced dead.

The incident has drawn comparisons to that of Mahsa Amini, a 22-year-old Kurdish woman who died under suspicious circumstances on 16 September 2022 while in the custody of the morality police. Amini's death sparked nationwide protests across Iran. In response to the protests, the regime has cracked down on activism and tightened hijab laws. The Geravand case has drawn widespread international condemnation, criticism, and calls for an independent investigation. Iran's government has dismissed international criticism, calling it "interventionist".
