= Vahid Sayadi Nasiri =

Iranian human rights activist and political prisoner

- Vahid Sayadi Nasiri's portrait
- Born: 27 August 1980; Tehran, Iran
- Died: 12 December 2018 (aged 38); Shahid Beheshti Hospital, Qom, Iran
- Cause of death: Starvation
- Occupations: Human rights activist, Political activist, blogger, real estate specialist
- Known for: Long-time hunger striker

Vahid Sayadi Nasiri (Persian: وحید صیادی نصیری; 27 August 1980 – 12 December 2018) was an Iranian human rights activist and political prisoner who died on hunger strike. Sayadi Nasiri was also a constitutional monarchist whose social media-based anti-Islamic republic point of view caused him to be put in jail.

== Life ==
In 2018 he was moved from Evin prison to Qom's central prison which he was critical of its maintenance and health-care conditions.

Vahid Sayadi Nasiri started a hunger-strike in prison to protest his allegedly illegal and uncomfortable situation in prison. Finally, on 5 December 2018, Nasiri was moved from prison to the Shahid Beheshti Hospital of Qom and seven days later died.

== Imprisonment and hunger strike ==
Vahid Sayadi Nasiri was initially arrested in September 2015 and sentenced to eight years in prison. Nasiri had been accused on charges of insulting the supreme leader of the Islamic Republic government of Iran, Ayatollah Ali Khamenei and enforcement against the state. The charges stemmed from posts he had made on his Facebook page. He had already spent two and a half years in prison and allegedly had been the subject of abuse and harassment. He was again detained in July 2018 for the second time after being freed for months. He had not eaten for 60 days to protest against the lack of legal protection and the prison regime of Iran.

== International Feedback ==
On 20 December 2018 Human Rights Watch urged the regime in Iran to investigate and find an explanation for the death of Vahid Sayadi Nasiri who had been jailed for insulting the Supreme Leader Ali Khamenei. According to his family Nasiri had been on hunger strike but he was denied medical attention before he died.

== See also ==
- Bobby Sands
