= Mehdi Rajabian =

Iranian musician and composer (born 1989)

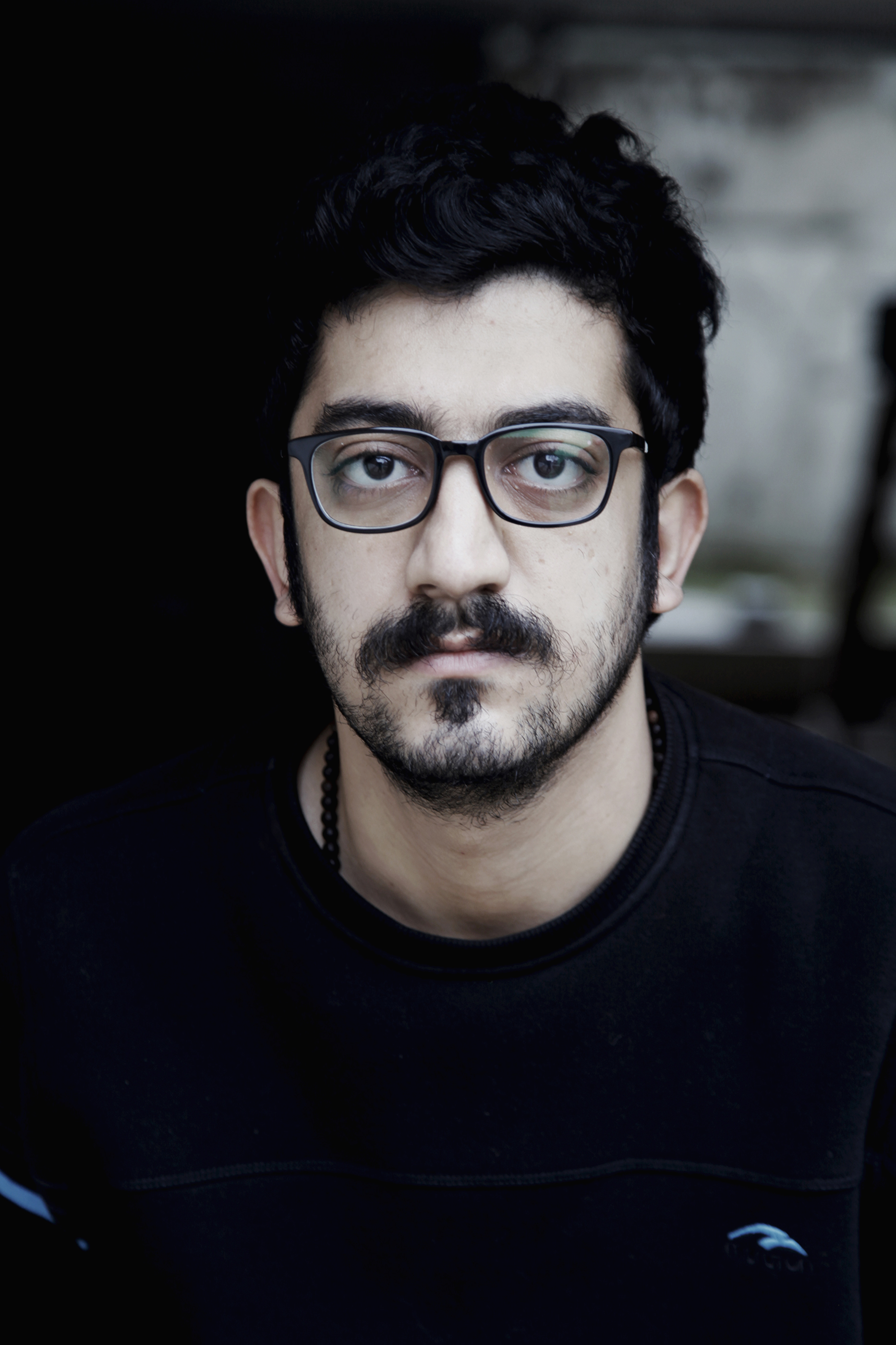
- Born: October 1989 (age 36); Sari, Iran
- Education: Music (Unfinished)
- Occupations: Musician and founder of Barg Music
- Years active: 2007–present
- Known for: Barg Music
- Honours: Cartoon Campaign For Mehdi Rajabian

Mehdi Rajabian (Persian: مهدی رجبیان; born October 1989) is an Iranian composer and musician. He was imprisoned for pursuing illegal musical activities in 2013 and 2015. In 2019, he released the album Middle Eastern in collaboration with a number of other Middle Eastern artists. Rajabian as the first composer who received the Minority Award of the United Nations. Rajabian has collaborated with musicians including Harvey Mason Jr., Jeff Coffin, Daniel Ho, Wouter Kellerman, Taylor Eigsti, Nicole Zuraitis, Emmanuele Baldini in different projects. Rajabian made music for several official video teasers of Mercedes-Benz.

== Personal life ==
He learnt the hierarchies of the Iranian music during a few years commencing the learning from the masters of the traditional music and recorded and played several albums, e.g. "Research Album of the History of Iran narrated by Setar" as the Setar player, composer and producer. He has also worked as the sound recordist and the sound recording director in the several music albums. Rajabian was also a student in relation with his professional music activity; after he was arrested in 2013, he was unable to continue with education in this field.

== Activities and arrest ==
Rajabian officially participated and monitored the quality of the publication and the music composition. He was arrested by Iranian security forces on 5 October 2013 in his office and transferred to Ward 2A of Evin Prison and was sentenced to more than two months in solitary confinement, while this arrest ceased his personal project. When Rajabian was arrested, he was recording "Research Album of History of Iran narrated by Setar ", his personal studio, all recordings, hard drives of recorded music were confiscated and the project became silent.

== Imprisonment and hunger strike ==
Mehdi Rajabian was imprisoned in the ward 7 of Evin Prison in Tehran, but after a contentious struggle with the judicial officer of the prison was sent to the ward 8 for punishment. After 10 months of the period of imprisonment, he went on a hunger strike to protest against the unjust trial, lack of medical facilities in prison, and his transfer to the ward 8 isolating him from his brother. After 14 days of strike, he called off his strike by the interference of the official representative of the prosecutor sent to the prison as an intermediary. However, he published an open letter addressing the judicial authorities of Iran, could attract the supports of the artists of the world by a 30-day hunger strike, and convince the judicial authorities to give him medical leave for the treatment of diseases arising out of hunger strike. Following that, he could return to the ward 7 too.

== Re-arrest ==
Mehdi Rajabian was arrested once again on 11 August 2020 for publishing his latest album Middle Eastern. Later on, Fox News reported that he was temporarily released on bail until his court date. As Reuters reports, Rajabian "was arrested following media reports that his latest project will include women singing and the publication of a video of a woman dancing to his music". Al Jazeera also reported that he will be on a home arrest until the court date. Worldwide media coverage by Fox News, Reuters, Newsweek, BBC News, ABC, Financial Times, The National, la Repubblica, Al Arabiya, Corriere, etc. has forced the regime to approve Rajabian being released on bail until the court date. In his previous case back in 2015, after spending two years in prison, Rajabian went on a 40 days hunger strike which forced the authorities to temporarily release him. In the case mentioned earlier, he also had a three years of suspended sentence which now can be executed at any moment. After his release back then, Mehdi Rajabian went on producing Middle Eastern. Music, Painting, Dancing, Photography, and Book writing were the elements of Middle Eastern project. Musicians from all over the Middle East have participated in this project. Due to his arrest, this project was also left unfinished, just like the last ones. As for the music part of the project, the album was released by Sony Music in 2019.

== Reactions against arrest ==
The arrest of Mehdi Rajabian followed many reactions as Saeid Boumedouha's lecture, the head of Middle East and North Africa Amnesty International Organization can be noted in this regard. After the protests, Amnesty International via all of its branches around the world launched a campaign and acquired to release this artist and then more than twenty thousand artists across the world joined this campaign. However, before that, the international Free Muse, as the most important institution to track the status of the music artists around the world, launched a campaign and requested all artists in the world to accompany Mehdi Rajabian and protest the prison sentence of this artist. In this campaign, the International PEN Club, the International Campaign for Human Rights in Iran, the Council of Europe Artists, Songwriters and Composers Council of Europe and twenty other associations joined with Free Muse. Of course, before that, the annual report of Ahmed Shaheed, the UN representative for Human Rights in Iran and the letters of more than four hundred musicians and media members were handed to Ali Jannati, Minister of Culture and Islamic Guidance. The news on the imprisonment of Mehdi Rajabian, the Iranian artist, had globally great worldwide reflection, and it was covered by many news agencies including Washington Post, Guardian, Independent, Al-Arabiya, BBC, Le Figaro, CNN, Al Jazeera etc. Multiple artists joined the campaign, including Keyhan Kalhor Iranian musician, Nazanin Bonyadi Iranian-British Actress, Shirin Neshat Iranian-American Artist, Nasrin soutodeh Iranian activist & Lawyer, and Jafar Panahi Iranian Director.

Official Reactions

After imprisonment of Mehdi Rajabian, senior officials of the world started to react officially to this sentence. For instance, Ban Ki-moon, secretary general of the United Nations, issued a special declaration about the human rights in the world. In the ninth page of the annual declaration, he refers to the conditions of Mehdi Rajabian in the Iranian prisons, and asks the Iranian authorities to release this musician unconditionally. The United Nations in their annual meeting recorded the Mehdi Rajabian name in their annual report, artist who have been imprisoned and under ban for their art. It can be referred to the protesting speech delivered by Wilfred Moore, the Canadian Liberal Senator in the senate against the Iranian authorities and in support of Mehdi Rajabian. Following that, Philip Luther, the head of Amnesty International published an official video talking about Mehdi Rajabian and asked all artists of the world to launch a worldwide campaign to support him. After organizing an international petition by the Amnesty International, Johnny Depp, the American actor, and Peter Gabriel, the well-known musician initiated a campaign with the motto "Art is not a Crime" to protest against censorship and support Rajabian and all other imprisoned artists. After the imprisonment of Mehdi Rajabian, Åse Kleveland who is a Norwegian an artist and political leader declared her support to him, and asked for unconditional release of him and all artists imprisoned throughout the world.

On the other hand, a petition was signed by more than 12,000 people of different human right activists and artists addressing the Iranian authorities to review the judicial case of Mehdi Rajabian and several other prisoners. Finally, the United Nations Human Rights Committee unanimously passed a resolution against Iranian government for the flagrant violation of human rights as a reaction to the collective hunger strike of Mehdi Rajabian and seven other political and ideological prisoners of Evin Prison. Following that, the United States Senate extended the sanctions imposed on Iran for the violation of human rights for another ten years. The citizens of European countries initiated a supporting campaign and a sit-in in front of the Iranian Embassies in different countries while showing his photos.

== Trial sentence ==
The case of Mehdi Rajabian was investigated in summer 2015 in Branch 28 of the Revolutionary Court by Judge Mughiseh and finally he was charged of unauthorized art activity and insulting religious sanctities and advertisement against the regime and sentenced for six-year prison and fine. This sentence was on appeal to three years, imprisonment in Branch 54 of the Islamic Revolutionary Court and three years of suspended sentence.

== Mehdi Rajabian's protest ==
On Music Freedom Day, "Free Muse" (the international organization for advocating freedom of expression in the field of music) and the website of Music Freedom Day supported the protest movement of Mehdi Rajabian. He protested and announced in his Instagram page that his only property is his Setar to be sold to pay the fine as a part of the sentence. Fairy Muse and the website of Music Freedom Day, devoted many pages supporting the protest movement of this Iranian artist. Muse Freeman Foundation supported the sale of Mehdi Rajabian's instrument.

His setar was bought by Johan Verminnen, the Belgian Musician, in a ceremony hold for this purpose, and he was praised as a brave artist. Moreover, the Maestro Hossein Alizadeh, the Iranian setar and tar player, put one of Mehdi's musical instruments in his collection in his support.

== Cartoon Campaign For Freedom ==
In 2016 the French organisation The United Sketches started the Cartoon Campaign For Freedom, for the freedom of Rajabian. The campaign invited cartoonists around the world to draw a cartoon in support of Rajabian and to picture their time in Evin Prison. Some prominent artists and cartoonists joined the campaign, and a cartoon by the Russian cartoonist Victor Bogorad was a hit online.

== Coup of Gods ==
In autumn 2021, Mehdi Rajabian released his album Coup of Gods. The album involved an international creative team, including Ukrainian director Roman Honcharenko and musicians from around the world.

Rajabian and Honcharenko collaborated on a teaser trailer for the album. The album featured a Brazilian orchestra, musicians from Turkey, and two female singers from the United States.

Rajabian faced the possibility of arrest and imprisonment in Iran in connection with the project. Coup of Gods was submitted for consideration at the Grammy Awards.

== Discography ==
Album artists	Album	Release date
Mehdi Rajabian	Coup of Gods	2021
Mehdi Rajabian	Middle Eastern	2019
Mehdi Rajabian	History of Iran Narrated by Setar	Banned by Iranian government
