= Center for Human Rights in Iran =

American non-government organisation

The Center for Human Rights in Iran (CHRI; formerly the International Campaign for Human Rights in Iran, ICHRI) is an American non-government organization that aims to promote human rights in Iran.

The group started in late 2007 when several human rights activists working for the Dutch non-governmental organization 'Foundation for Human Security in the Middle East' wished to focus on the situation in Iran.

== Background ==
Hadi Ghaemi is the executive director (as of April 2019). He graduated from Boston University in 1994 and then taught physics at New York University until 2000. He has worked for human rights since and, in 2003, received a research grant from the MacArthur Foundation.

In October 2015, actor and activist Nazanin Boniadi joined the Board of Directors of the Center for Human Rights in Iran.

== See also ==
- Human rights in the Islamic Republic of Iran
