= Somayeh Tohidlou =

Iranian blogger and political activist

- Born: 1979
- Occupation: blogger

Samiye Tohidlou (also Somayeh Tohidlou) (born 1979) is an Iranian blogger and political activist. She was sentenced to 50 lashes for her activities in protest of the 2009 presidential election in Iran.

== Life ==
Tohidlou is a doctoral student in sociology at Tehran University, and an active member of the Islamic Student Association. She was a volunteer for the 2009 presidential campaign of Mir Hussein Mousavi. According to journalist Abbas Milani, it was Tohidlou who had the idea of an "uninterrupted chain" of supporters and a green ribbon connecting Tehran’s rich, north neighborhoods with its poor south. The day after the election, June 14, her home was searched and her phone and laptop were confiscated and she was arrested. She was incarcerated in Evin prison for 70 days and released with a bail of $200,000. A lower court sentenced her to one year in prison and 50 lashes, and an appeals court eliminated the one-year prison sentence but upheld the flogging sentence. According to Kaleme website, her sentence was related to her blogging and other internet activities, but other sources state she was prosecuted for her planning the human chain between two squares in Northern and Southern Tehran in support of Mir Hossein Mousavi’s presidential campaign in 2009. Her lashes were administered 15 September 2011, and in conflict with the Islamist tenant of separation of the sexes they were reportedly administered by a male, not a female. The punishment prompted her to write in her blog addressing her flogger:

“Be happy. Your intention was my humiliation. I confess my whole body and soul experienced this humiliation. So much so that I can’t believe I can ever sustain it again. … You have humiliated me today. My pride was broken.”
