= Death of Farshid Hakki =

2018 killing of an Iranian environmentalist

Farshid Hakki
- Born: June 2, 1974; Arak, Iran
- Died: October 17, 2018 (aged 44); Tehran, Iran
- Known for: Lawyer, Economist and Environmentalists

Farshid Hakki (Persian: فرشید هکی; born 1974) was a lawyer, lecturer, economist, researcher, human rights activist and environmentalist. Farshid Hakki was also a candidate for the Tehran City Council. He was a member of the "Seda-ye Pa-ye Ab", an environmental campaign in support of Zagros Mountain range and was the author of a number of books including Human Rights for All, and The Political Economy of Human Rights.

He went missing on the night of Saturday October 17, 2018 in Tehran. After his deceased body was found, his family was informed that his body had knife wounds and had been burned.

Mohammad Moghimi, his family lawyer, called the death "a suspicious murder". State Media in Iran have published conflicting reports stating that the cause of death was suicide and that Hakki had set himself on fire. Iranian opposition parties have accused the Iranian government of being responsible, highlighting the increasing violence against activists in the southern Ahwaz.

== Reactions ==
According to the Le Monde diplomatique, "Farshid Hakki was reportedly stabbed to death near his house in Tehran and his body then burned. Shortly after the news of his death broke out on social media, on 22 October, Tehran's police authorities claimed that he had committed suicide by self-immolation. Not unlike its Saudi rival, the Islamic Republic has a long history of trying to cover up state-sanctioned attempts to physically eliminate its critics, too."

== See also ==
- Chain murders of Iran
- Human rights in Iran
