= Barg Music =

Former Iranian music publisher

- Website type: Music
- Founded: 2007 – 2013
- Headquarters: Tehran, {{{location_country}}}
- Area served: Worldwide
- Founder: Mehdi Rajabian

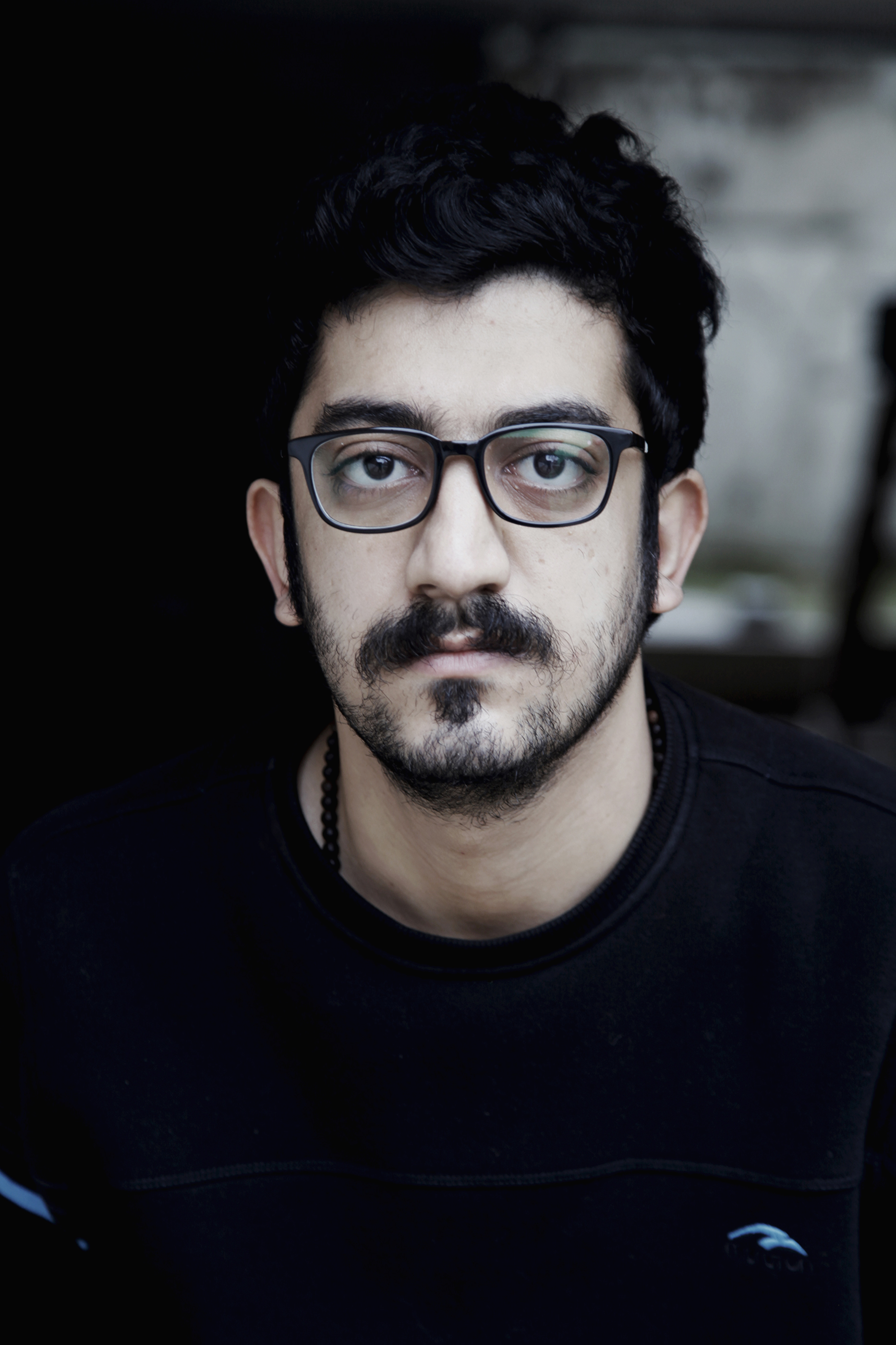
Mehdi Rajabian, the founder of Barg Music

Barg Music (Persian : برگ موزیک an acronym for بنیاد رسمی گزارش موسیقی : Official Foundation for Music Reports) was an Iranian website and music publisher. It was founded in 2007 by the composer and setar player Mehdi Rajabian, who also ran the company. The website was in English and Persian and played a significant role in producing and publishing alternative music in Persian.

== Closure ==
Barg Music was forced to close on October 5, 2013, after the arrest of Mehdi Rajabian by the Iranian intelligence agency. Rajabian was accused of cooperating with underground singers and of publishing the voices of women singers, contrary to the Islamic laws of Iran.

== Confiscation ==
In an interview with Rolling Stone, Mehdi Rajabian stated that Barg Music Company was confiscated by the Iranian regime after his arrest.
