= Creation Between Two Surfaces =

2020 Iranian film

Creation between Two Surfaces
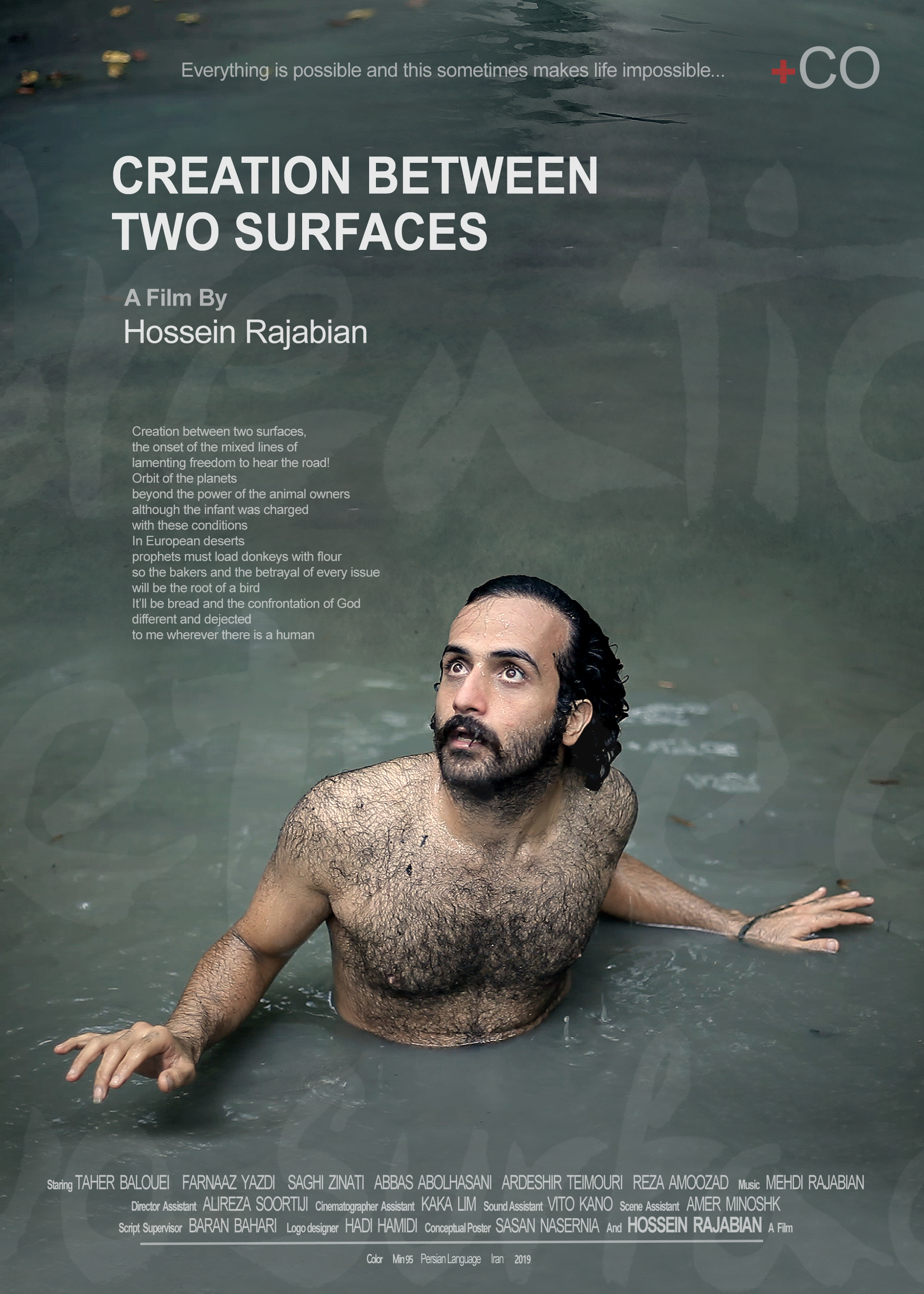
- Creation between Two Surfaces official poster
- Directed by: Hossein Rajabian
- Produced by: Hossein Rajabian
- Cinematography: Hossein Rajabian
- Music by: Mehdi Rajabian
- Production company: +Co Film/Barg Film
- Release date: February 2020 (Protest Online)
- Running time: 95 minutes
- Country: Iran
- Language: Persian - English Subtitle

Creation Between Two Surfaces (Persian: آفرینش بین دو سطح) is the second feature film by Iranian independent filmmaker Hossein Rajabian. It was written and directed by Rajabian, using digital cinema technology, as was his first film The Upside-down Triangle, but this one is in color. The film, released in 2020, was produced after his probation in 2019, when he was in an artistic ban. This film was banned by Iranian government and has not been screened anywhere.

== Synopsis ==
A man is tormented by the knowledge that he carries a gene that will make him go mad and end up in a mental hospital, like his father. With his wife, he enlists in a state-run psychological experiment that is threatening and manipulative. Lies, fear, and repression control their lives until they decide to fight for their freedom.

== Cast ==
- Taher Balouei
- Saghi Zinati
- Ardeshir Teimouri
- Farnaaz Yazdi
- Abbas Abolhassani
- Reza Amouzad

== Censorship ==
After his sentence for making The Upside-down Triangle, Rabjabian did not request a license from any government entity for making or distributing films.

== Release for protest ==
This film is in line with Iranian popular protests which culminated in November 2019, and was released on the internet for free in February 2020 by Rajabian as a show against censorship and in sympathy with the protesting people.

== Gallery ==
Photo gallery from the film

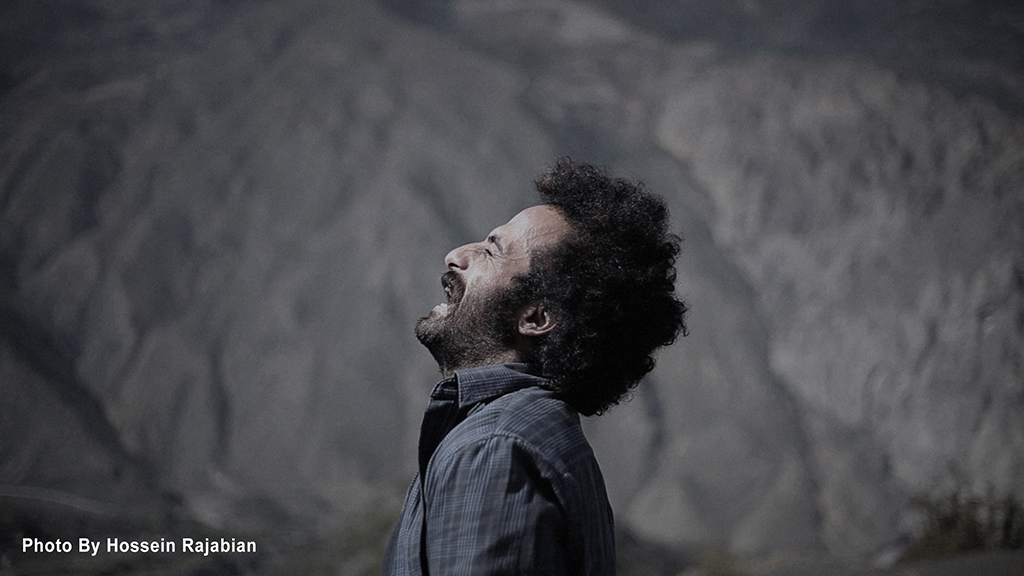

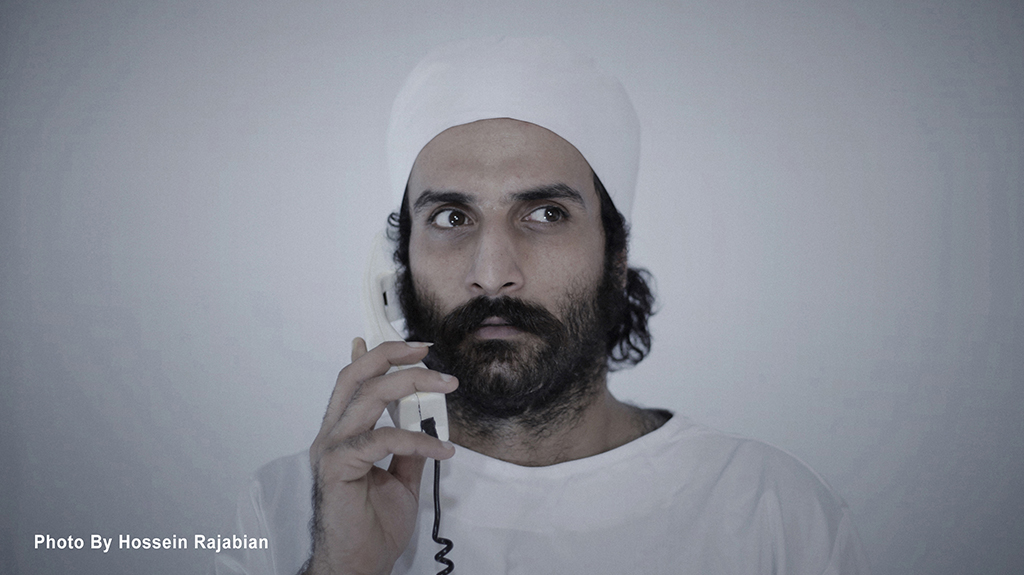

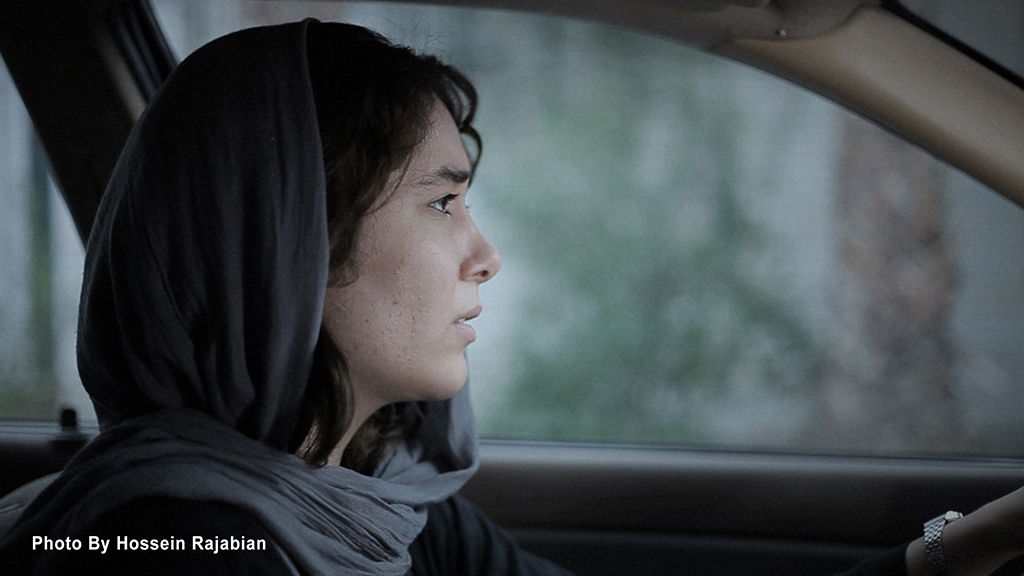

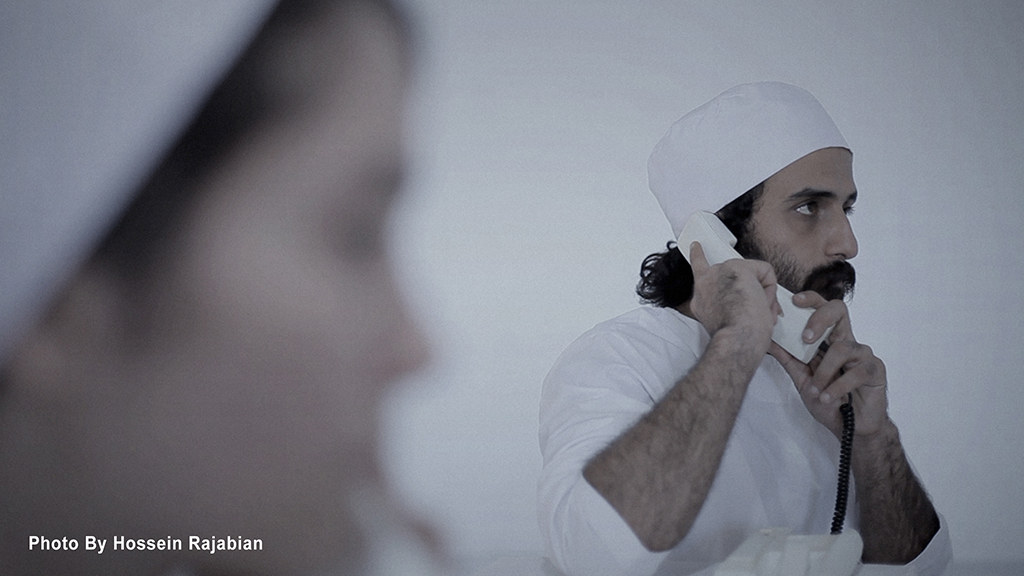

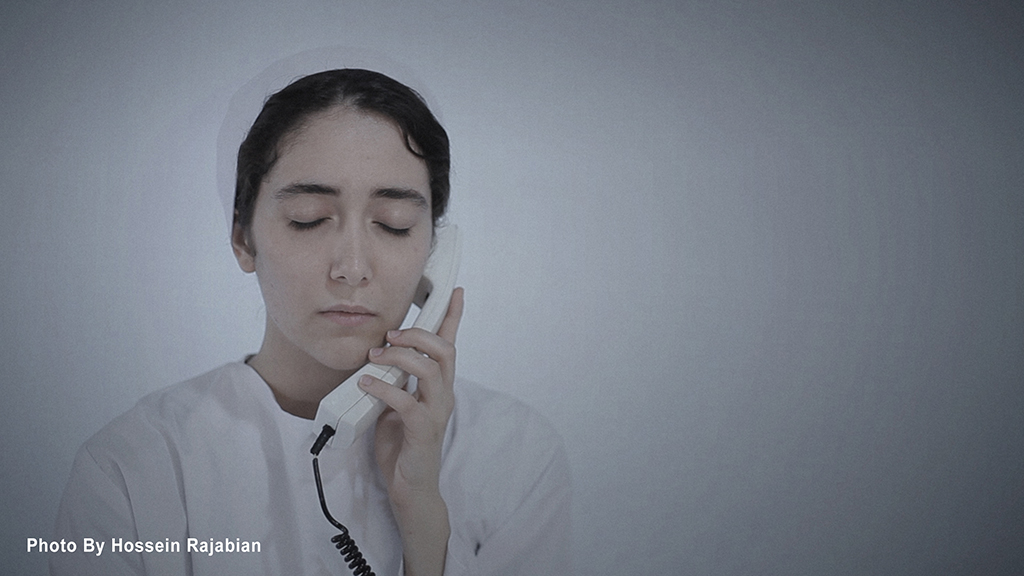

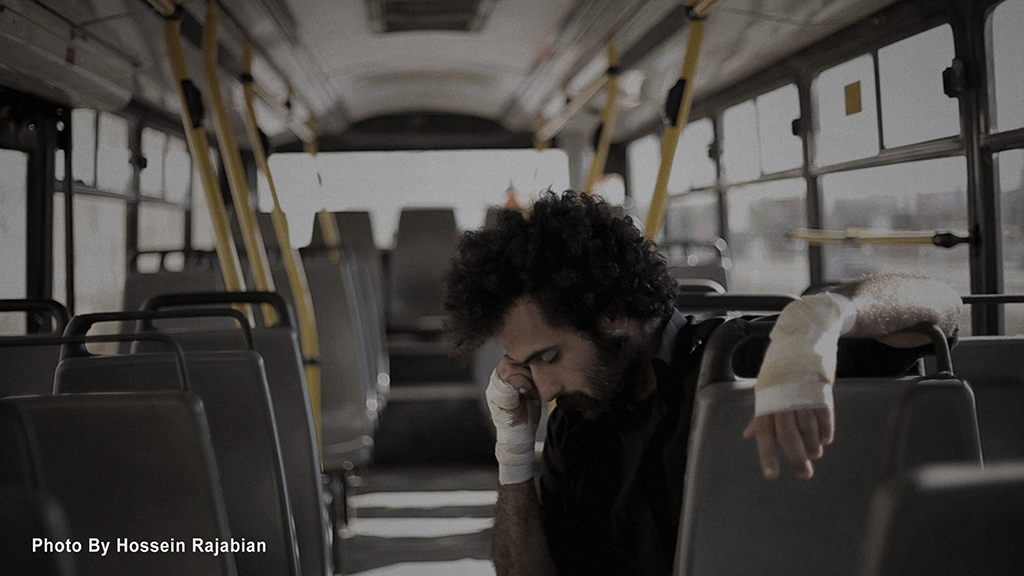

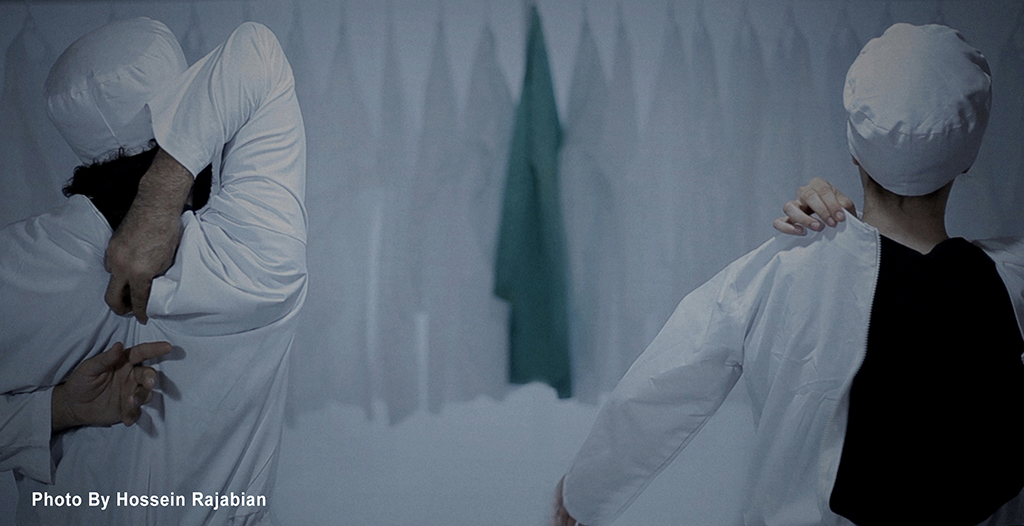

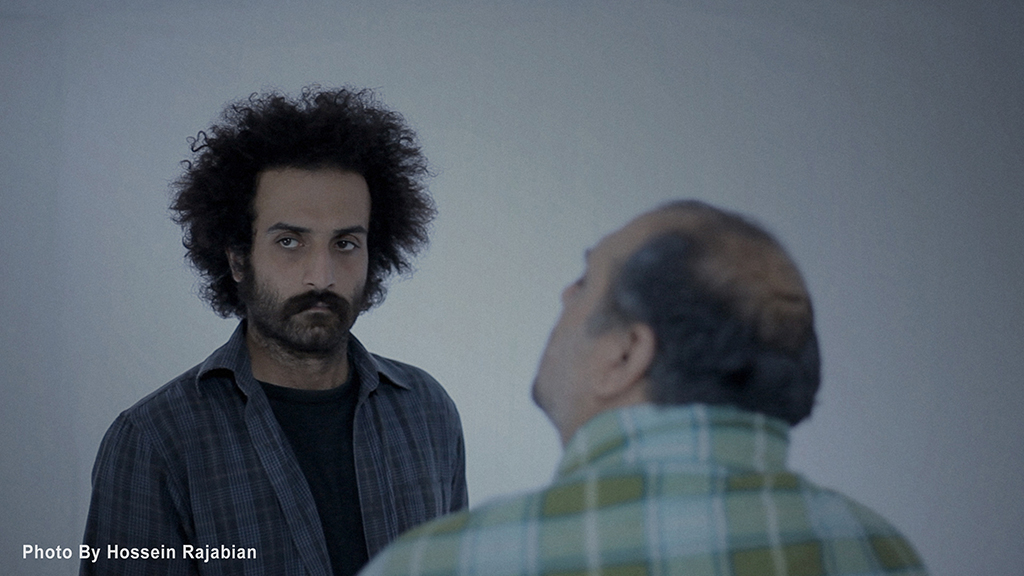

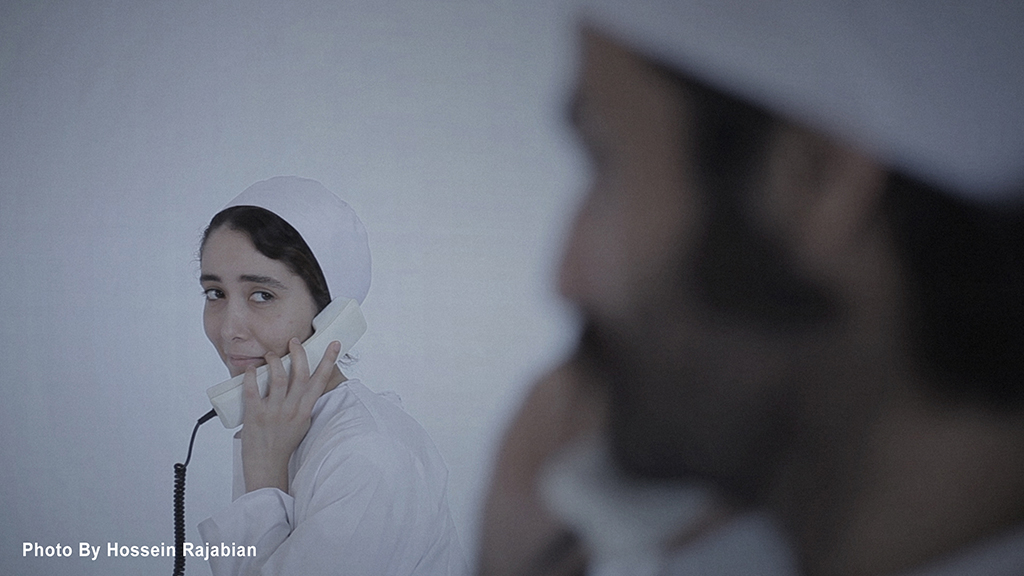

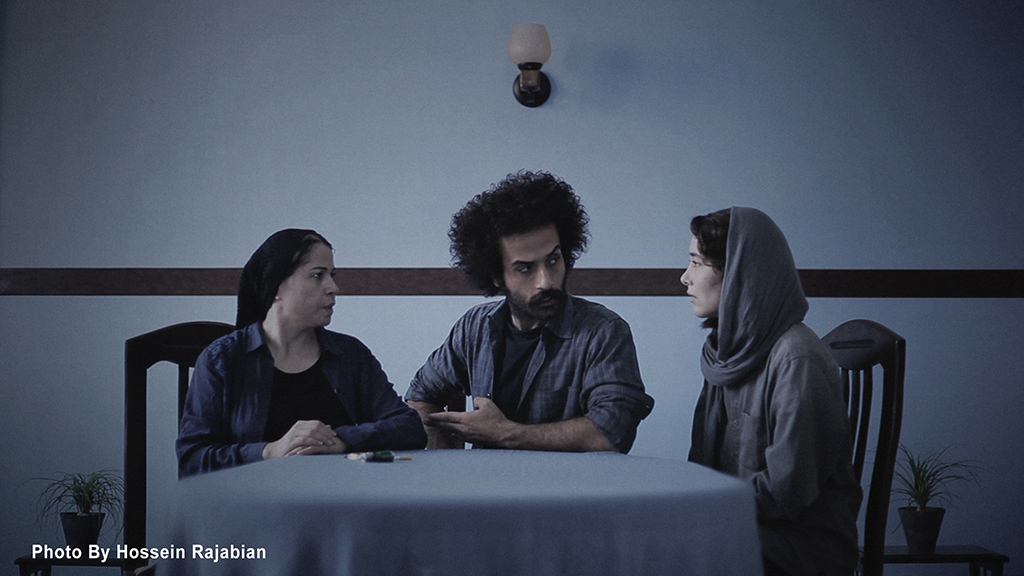

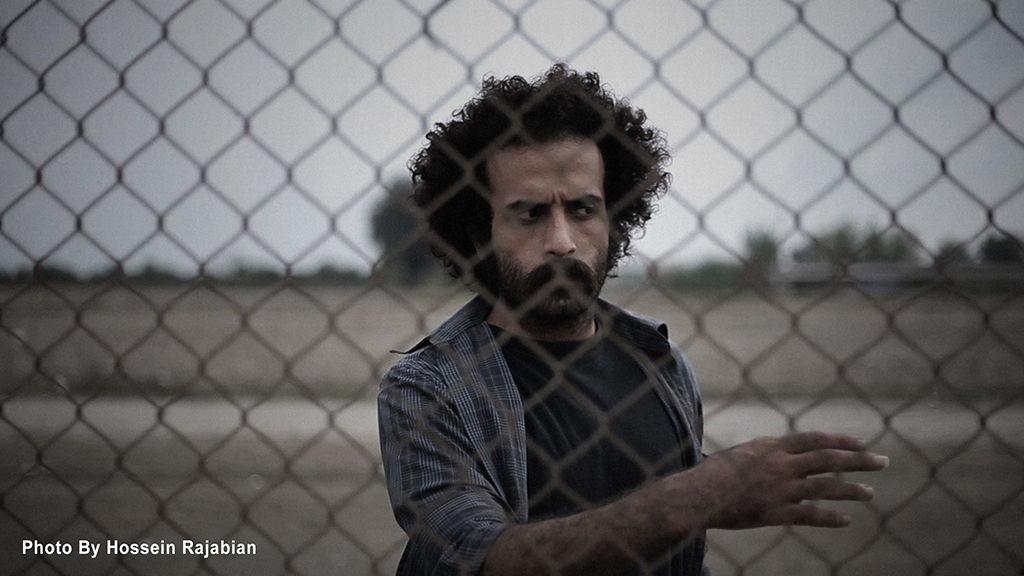

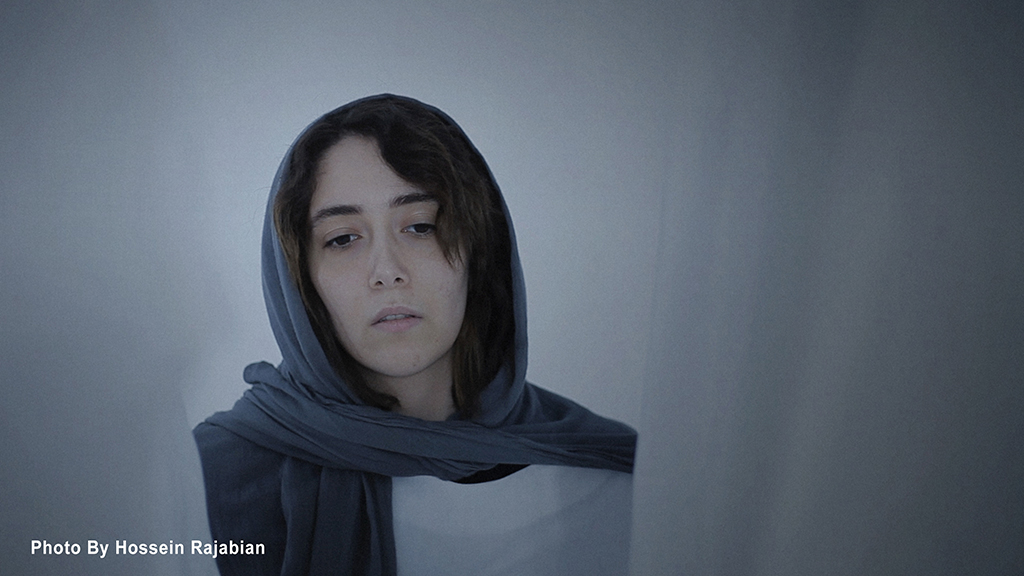

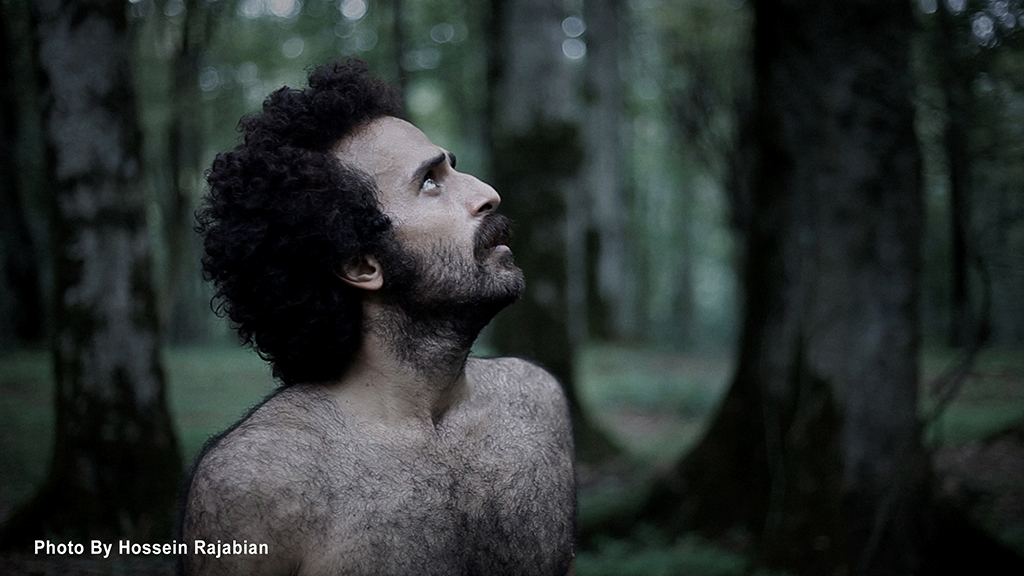

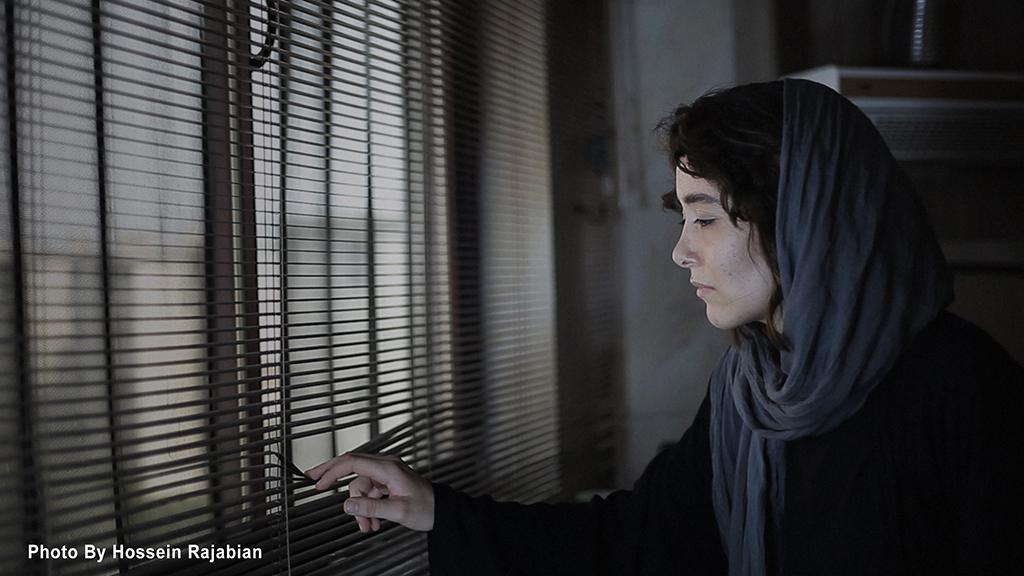

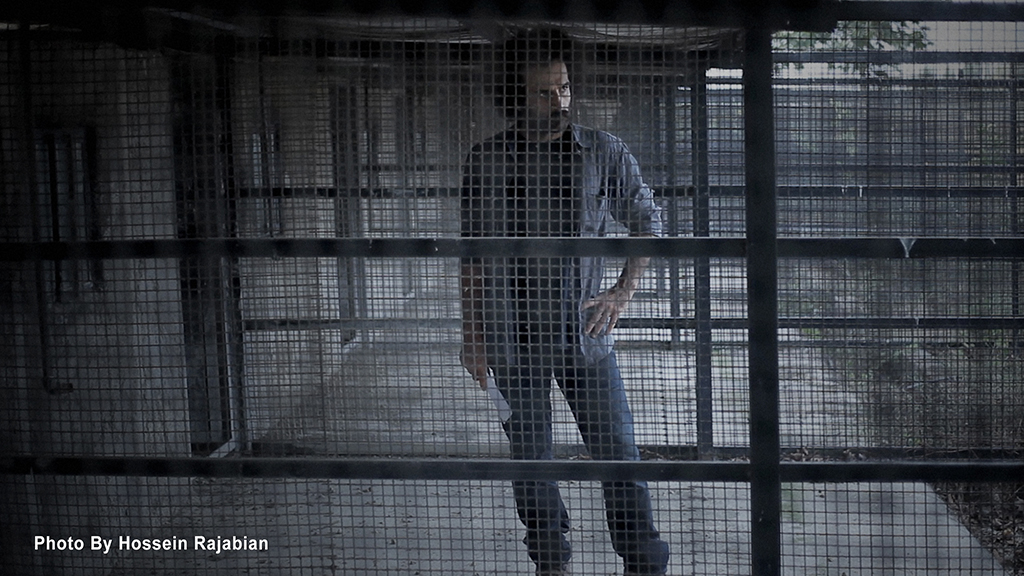

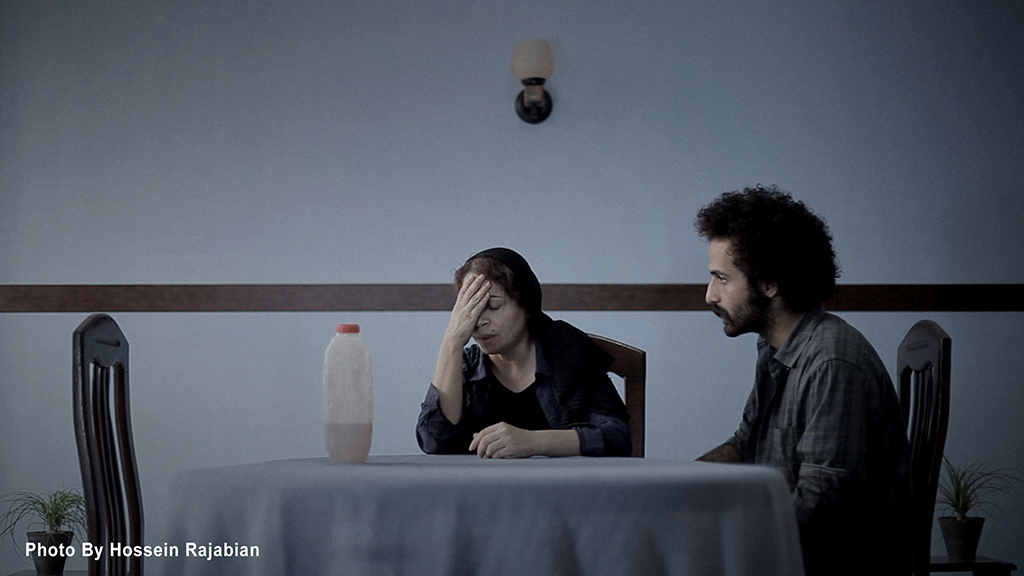

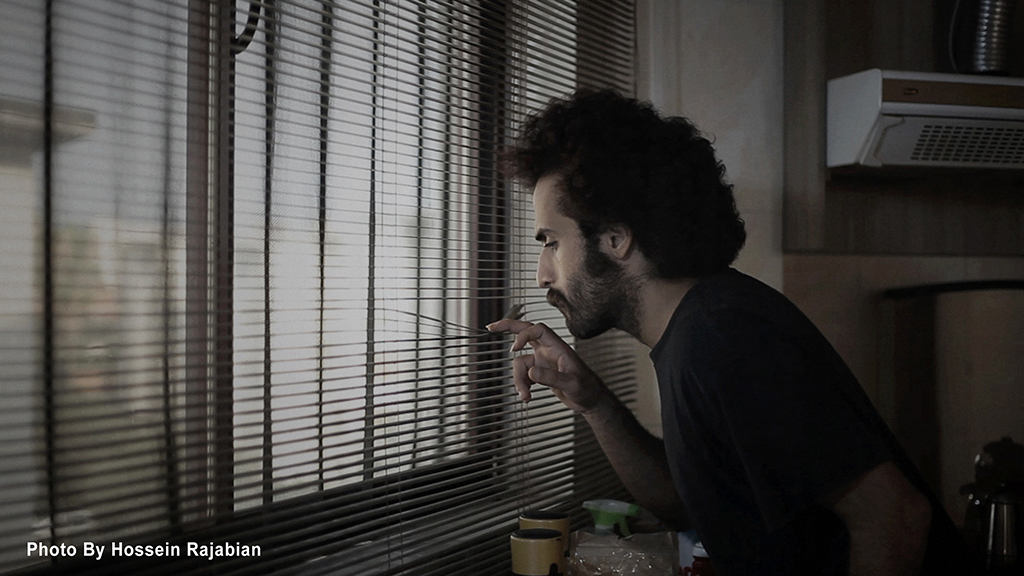

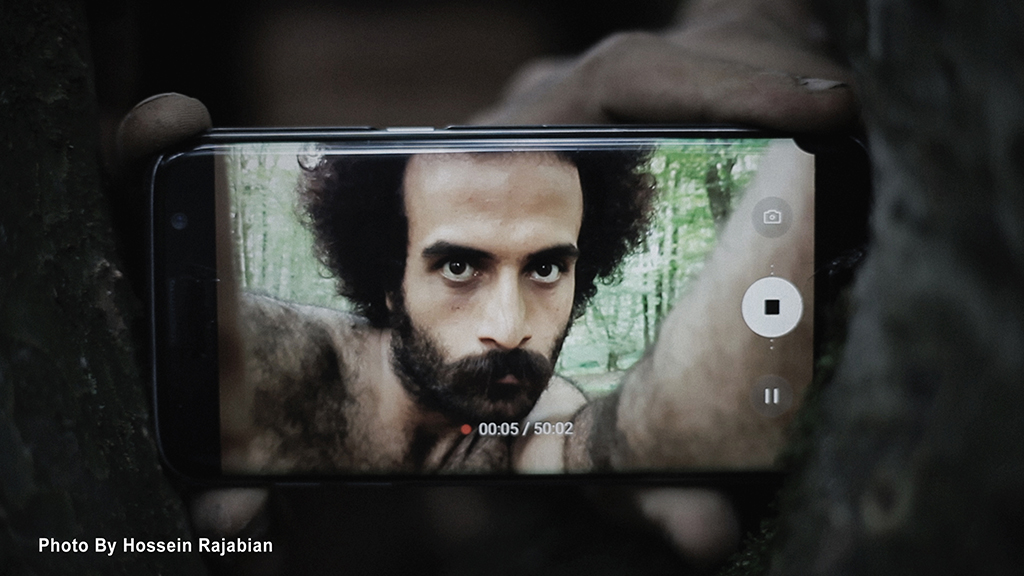

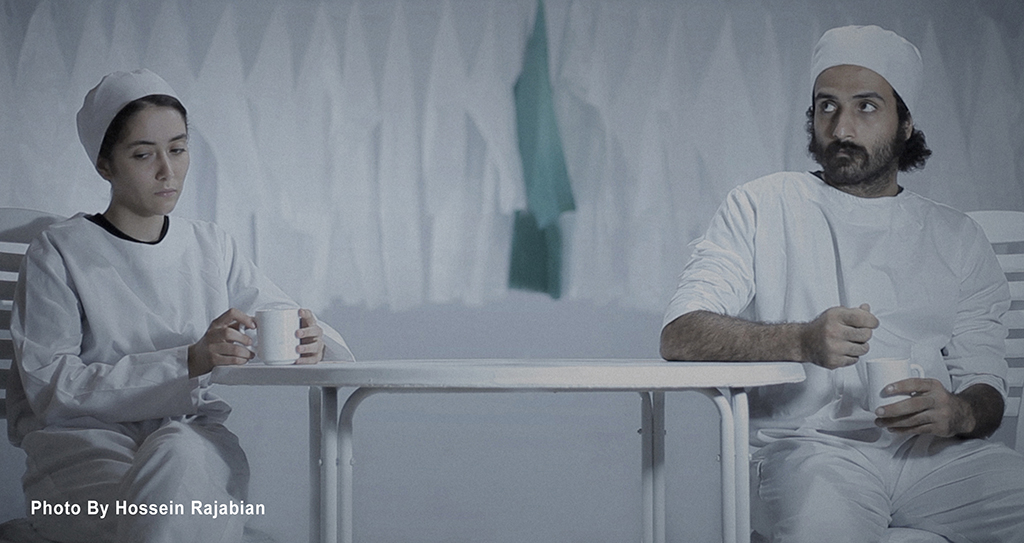

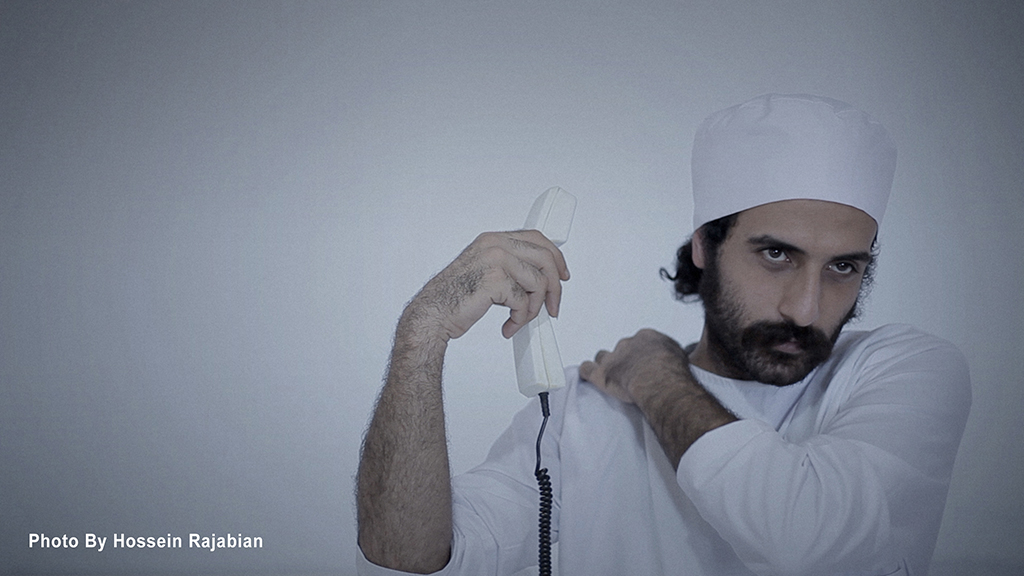

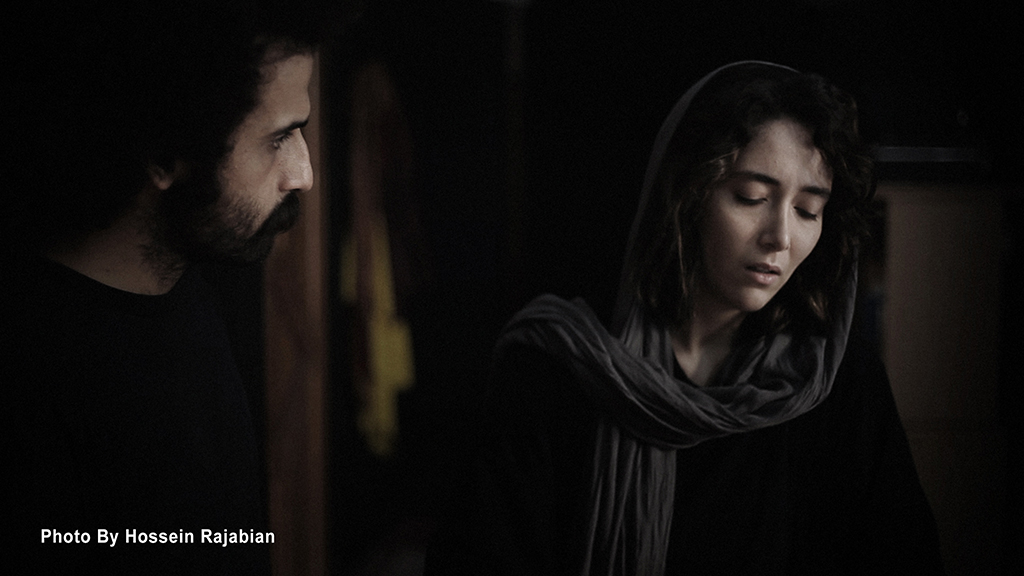

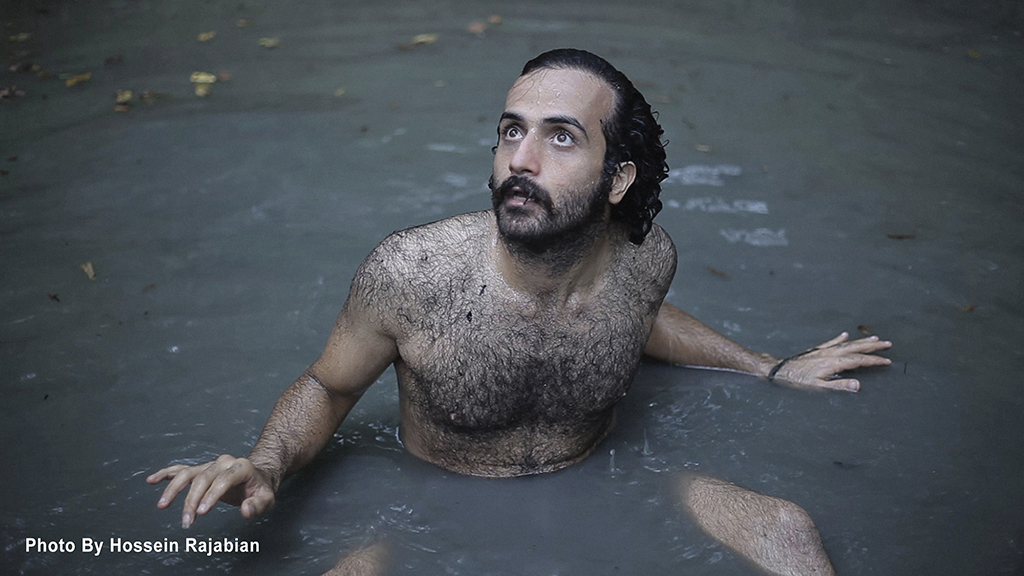

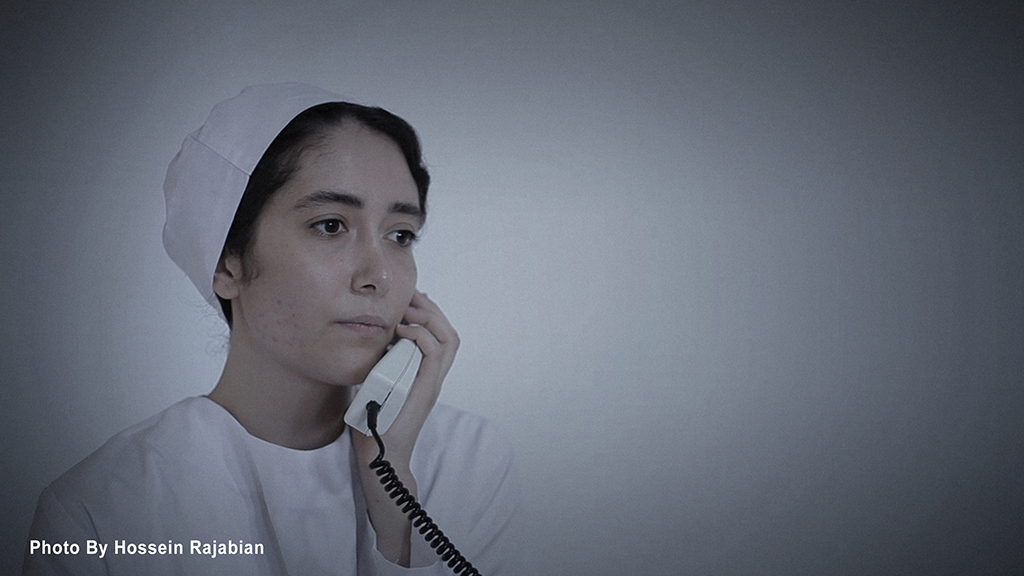

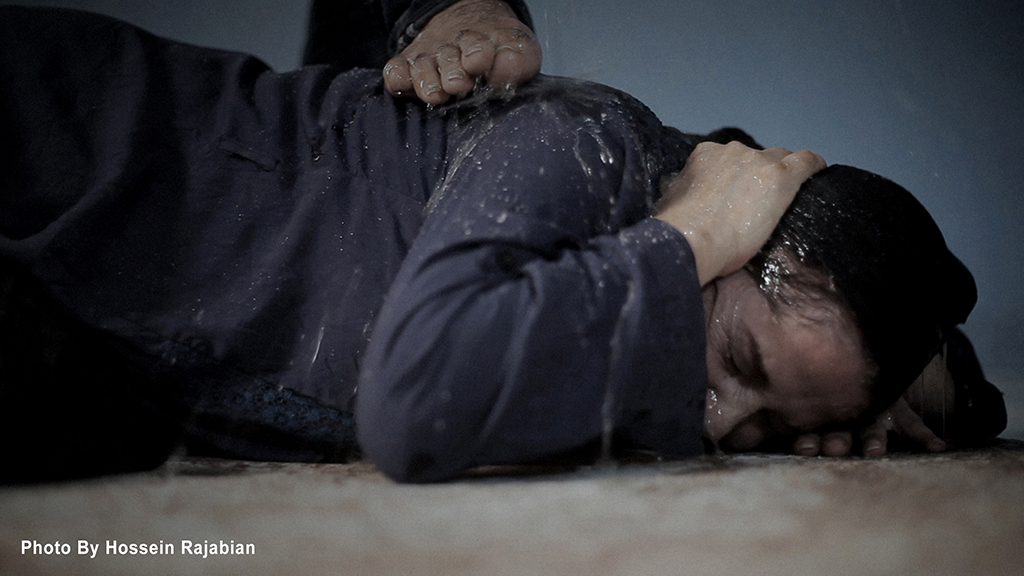

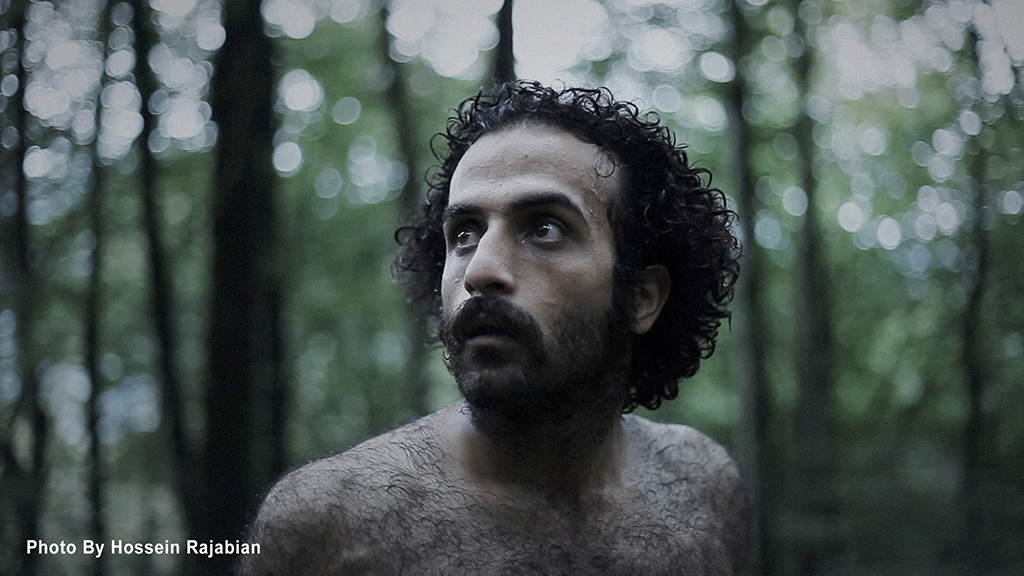

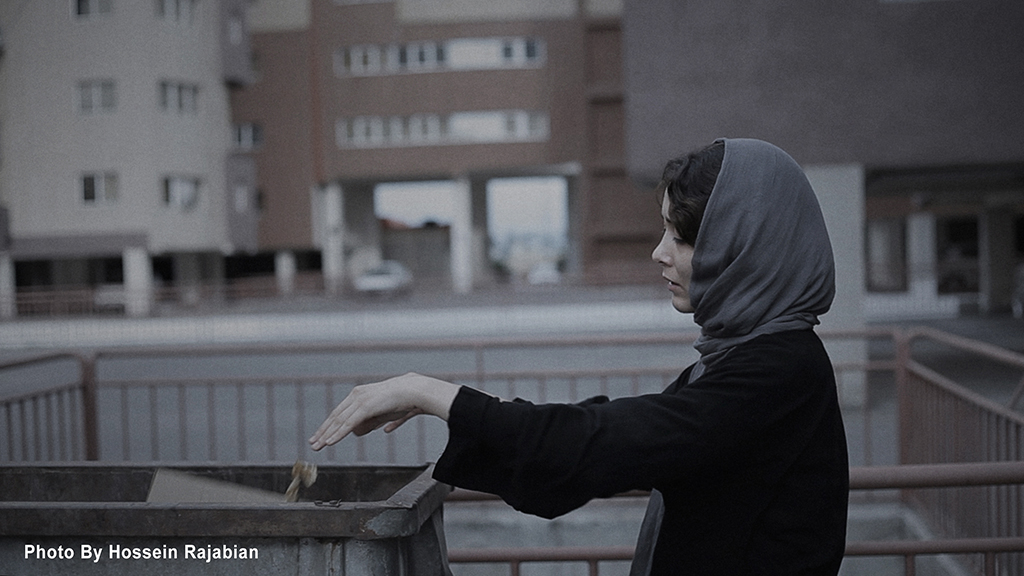

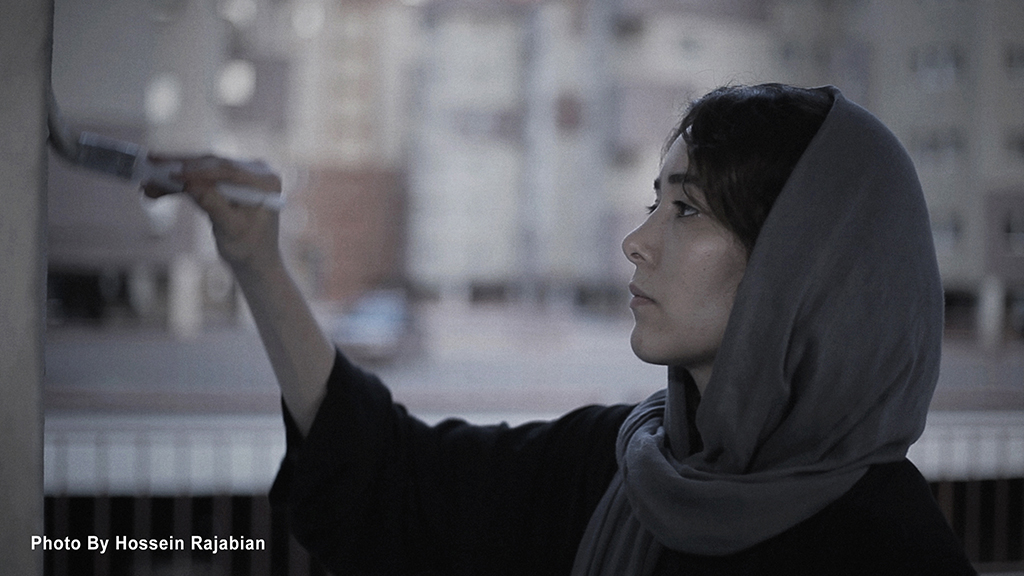

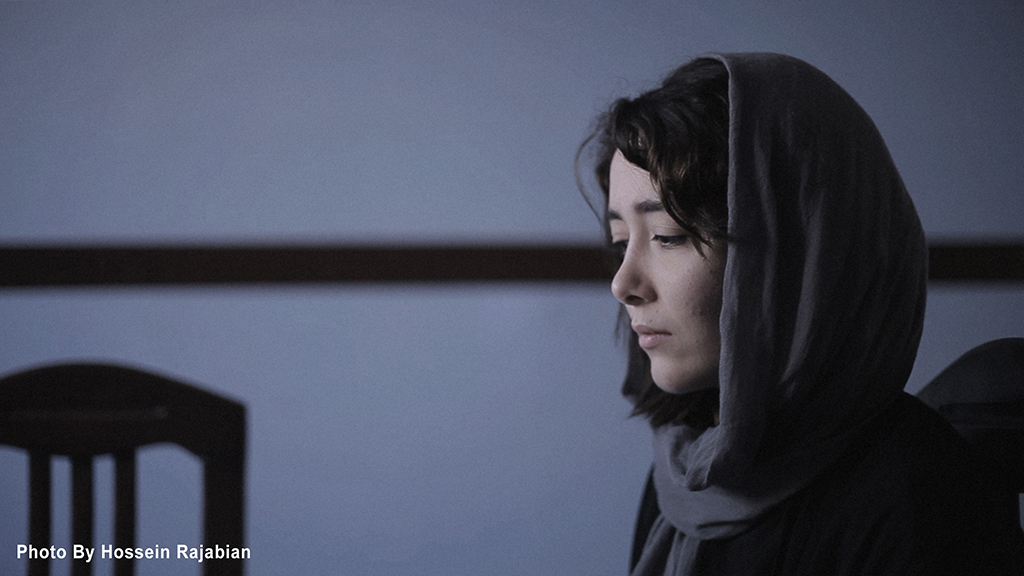

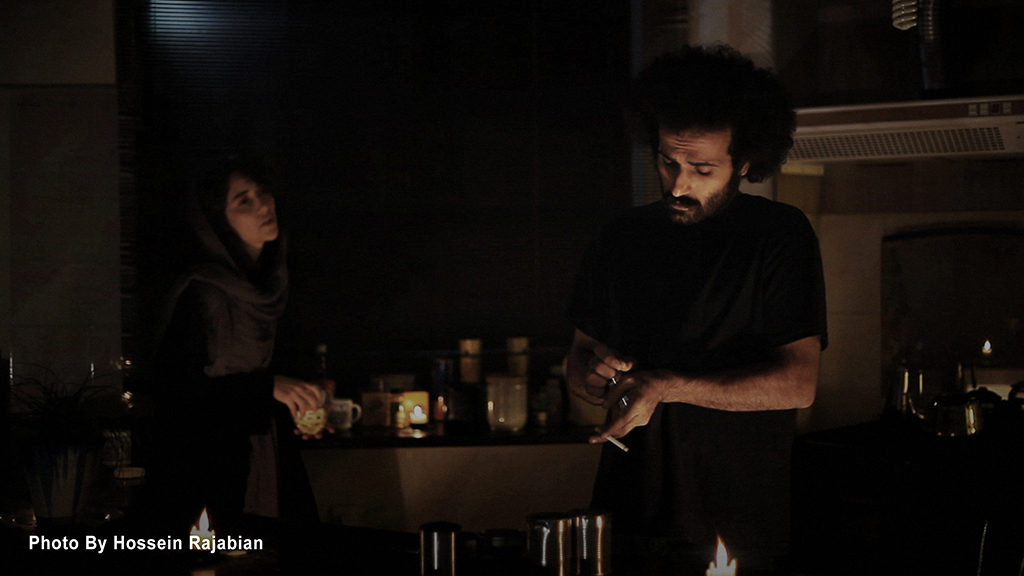
