= To Revolution Square =

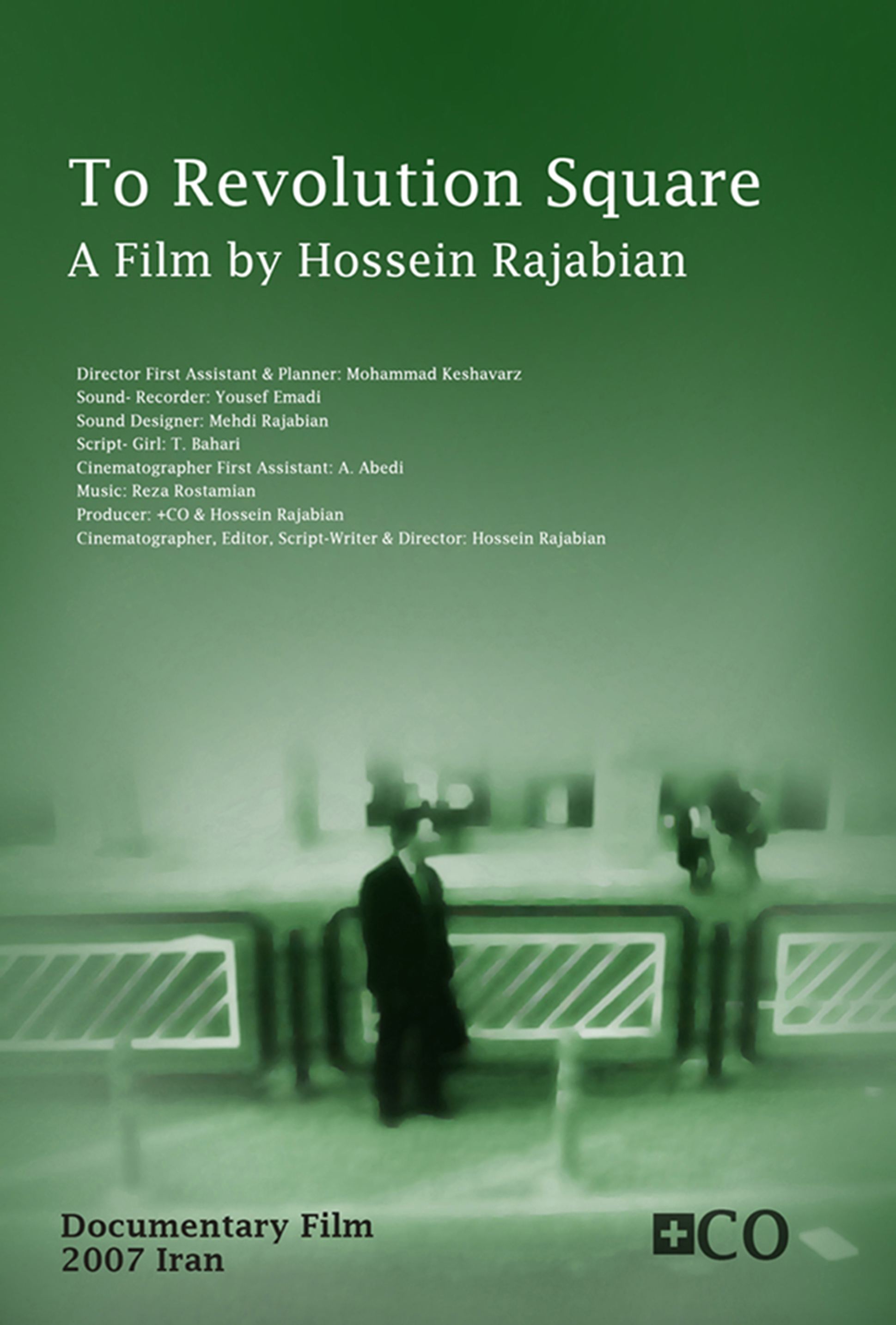
- Directed by: Hossein Rajabian
- Produced by: +CO & Hossein Rajabian
- Release date: 2007
- Running time: 22 minutes
- Country: Iran
- Language: Persian with English subtitles

To Revolution Square is the name of a documentary short film directed by Iranian filmmaker Hossein Rajabian.

== Synopsis ==
It portrays the commute of the common people in the Iranian capital city of Tehran who have to take the bus to go to Revolution Square on a daily basis. During the movie, people come to listen to strange radio news while they are on the bus. They don't react particularly to the unbelievable reports, though, and are incredibly detached.
