= Navigation (film) =

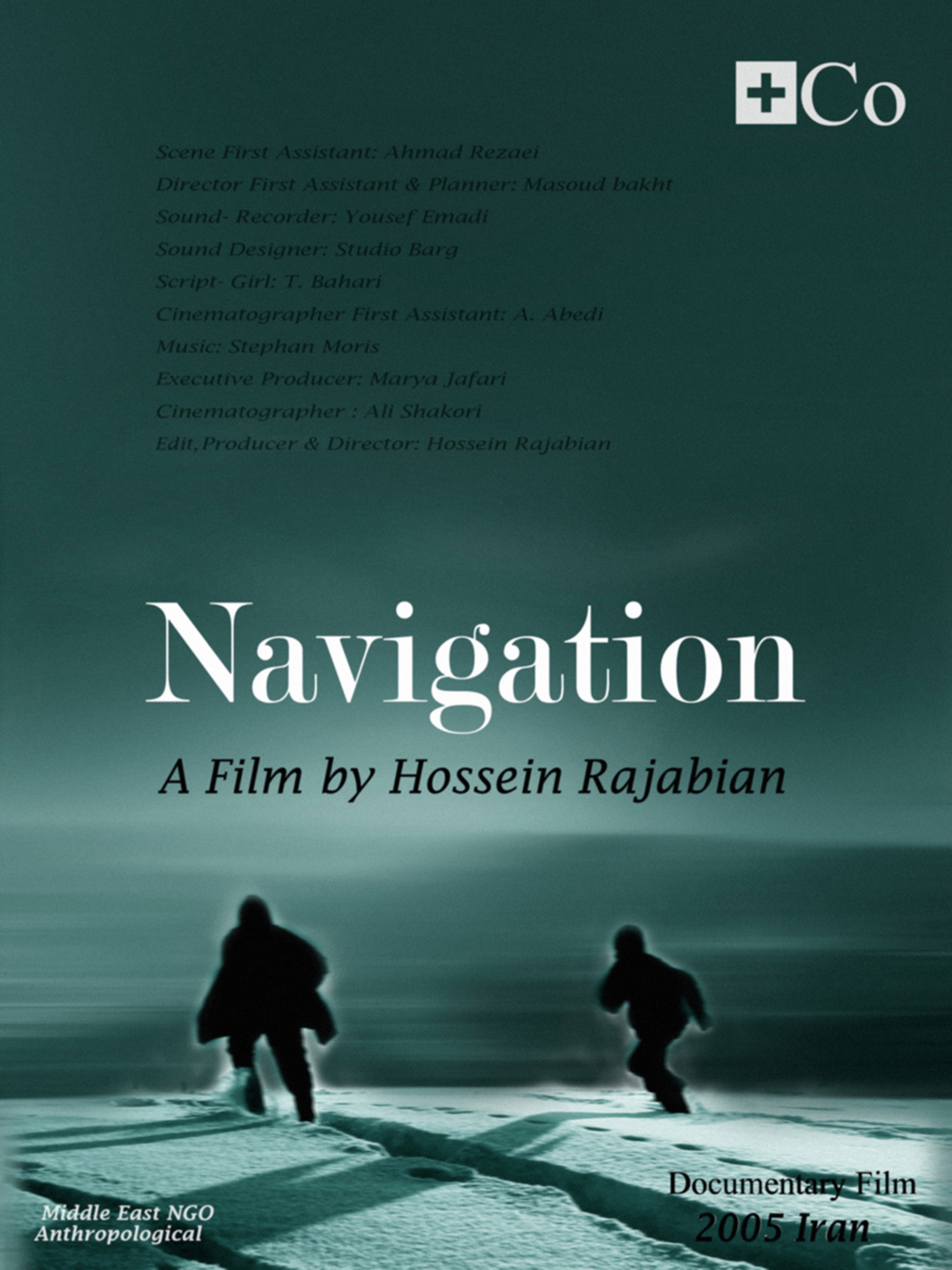
- Navigation A Film by Hossein Rajabian
- Directed by: Hossein Rajabian
- Produced by: +CO & Hossein Rajabian
- Cinematography: Ali Shakori
- Edited by: Hossein Rajabian
- Running time: 43 minutes
- Country: Iran
- Language: Persian by Subtitle English

“Navigation” is the name of a documentary film directed by Hossein Rajabian, the Iranian filmmaker. It was produced for an anthropological NGO in the Middle East, but was never released due to censorship in Iran. Because of the strong opposition of local authorities, he had to stop the production of the documentary in 2005 and continue it after four years. Rajabian became interested in the subject of the movie while he was on one of his photographing tours in the northern mountains of Semnan Province.

== Synopsis ==
The movie is about a group of children between eight and twelve years of age who had not left their village before the production of the work in 2005. They had not even gone to nearby villages because of the impassibility of the roads in their place of residence. However, one day, their teacher decides to take them to the sea. Their trip accidentally coincides with the travel of Anousheh Ansari, the first female Iranian astronaut, to space. The movie simultaneously narrates both events.
