= People in distance =

Photography Project by Hossein Rajabian Iranian Filmmaker, Photographer

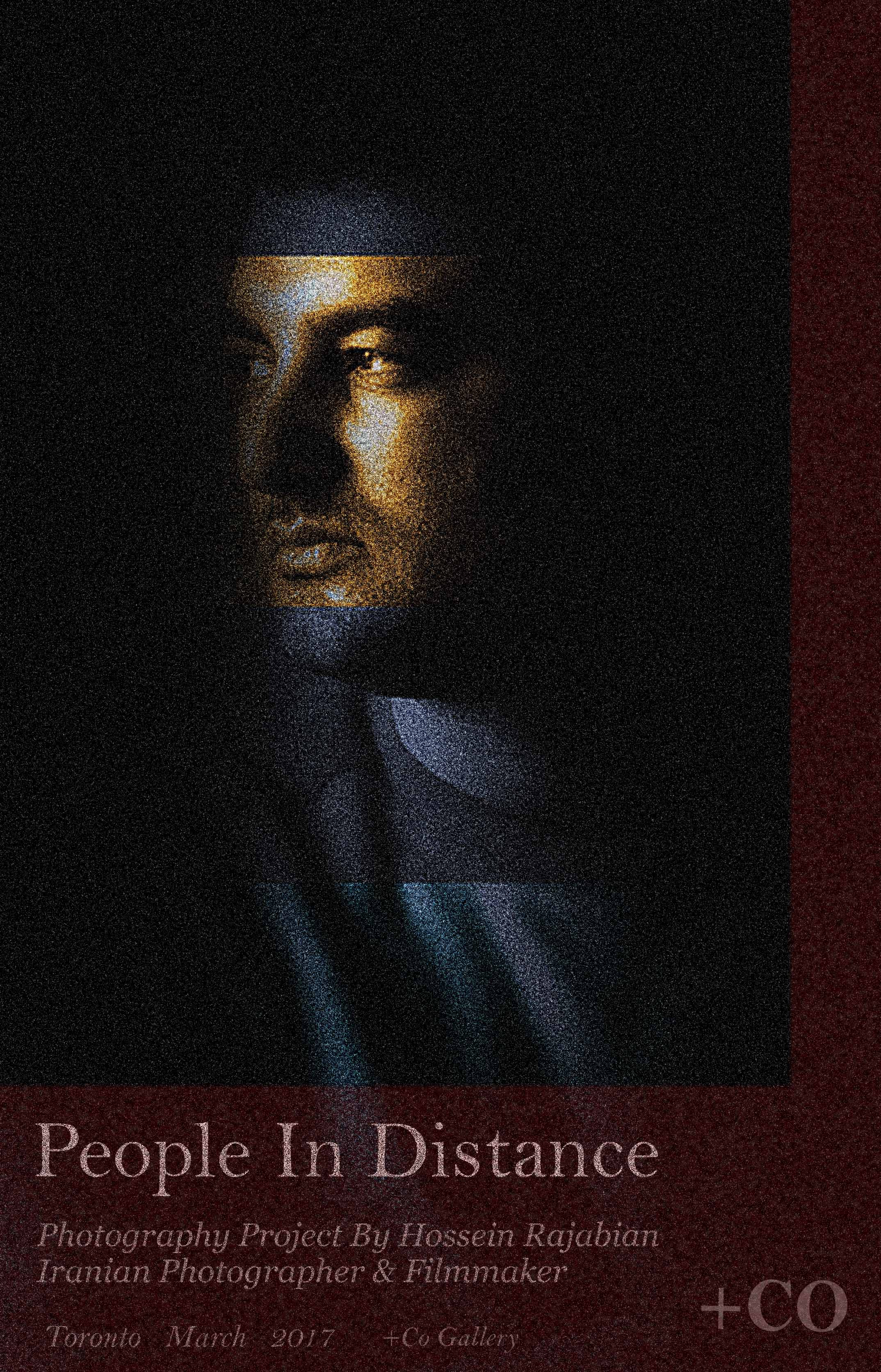
- People in Distance
- Other names: Hossein Rajabian Photography Project
- Classification: Portrait Photographs
- Types: Black and White photography
- Manufacturer: Hossein Rajabian

People in distance is the name of a black and white photography project implemented by Hossein Rajabian, the Iranian photographer. The photos were taken for a charity auction. This project started from 2002 and continued until the arrest of Hossein Rajabian in 2013. For this project, analogue and digital cameras were used for a better expression of the texture of the photos depending on the existing setting and subject.

== The theme of the photograph collection ==
People in distance includes the portrait photographs of the inhabitants of the most remote areas of Iran, and they are not seen in big cities. It was arranged that this photography project cover the portraits of children of Iran and provide them to UNICEF for the support of Iranian children. However, this arrangement was never accomplished due to the arrest of the photographer and seizure of the photographs by the Iranian intelligence forces.

== Arrest of the photographer and seizure of photographs ==
A large number of photographic negatives and digital records of these photos were seized by the intelligence forces of Iran, and there remained only a few number of low-quality photos. The high quality versions of these photographs have never been returned to their owner and photographer after being seized by the Iranian Intelligence Agency.

== Sources and external links ==
- Amnesty International
- washington post
- International Campaign for Human Rights in Iran
- culture action europe
- Coverage by The Guardian of Hossein Rajabian’s sentence
- Coverage by PEN International of Hossein Rajabian’s sentence
- Coverage by Freemuse (165 Iranian artists and activists protest charges against two musicians and a filmmaker)
- Covereage by El Espanol of Hossein Rajabian's sentence
- Covereage by CNN Arabic
- zhmag
- Covereage by AL JAZEERA Arabic
- International Film Festival Clermont
- The 10 Best Iranian Films of 2015
- Hossein Rajabian Official Website
- Hossein Rajabian youtube Channel
