= Hossein Rajabian =

Iranian filmmaker, writer, and photographer (born 1984)

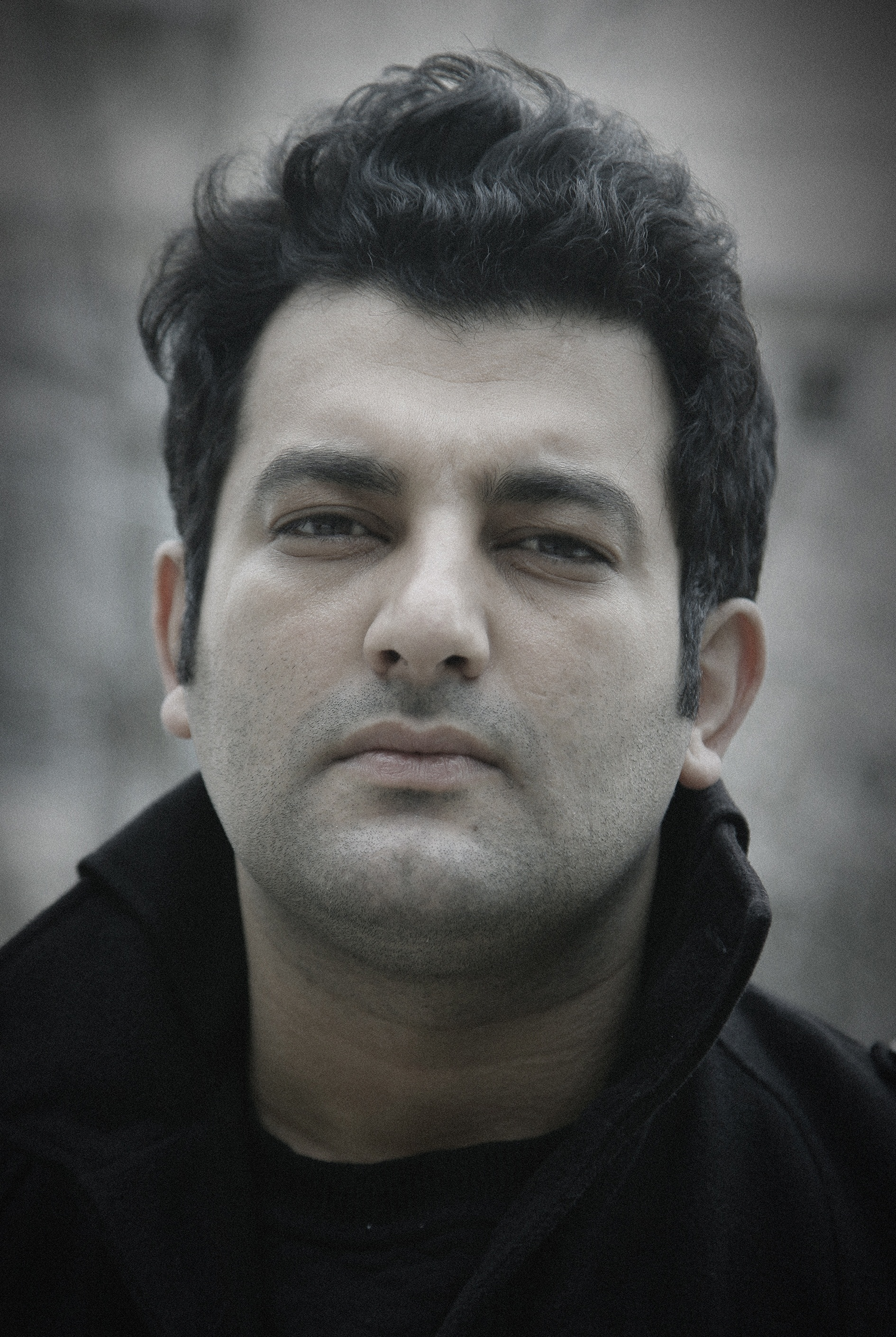
- Born: 5 July 1984 (age 42)
- Education: Dramatic literature (Unfinished)
- Occupations: Filmmaker, writer, photographer
- Awards: COR AWARD 2022

Hossein Rajabian (Persian: حسین رجبیان; born 5 July 1984) is an Iranian filmmaker, writer and photographer who was imprisoned as a political prisoner in 2015 on charges related to his filmmaking. He is an anti-censorship filmmaker and defender of freedom of speech for the arts.

== Artistic activities ==
Hossein Rajabian started off his artistic career in a theater school. Later he made his debut in cinema by making and editing short and documentary films. His artistic résumé is dotted with different projects ranging from making (feature) films, writing a number of screenplays for feature films, essays on cinema, plays, and carrying out artistic-photographical projects and film workshops. He also found his way into the Faculty of Art and Architecture in Tehran and studied Dramatic literature, but he never finished his studies there. Later he gained admission to the University of Music and Performing Arts, Vienna to continue his studies in cinema and theater, but he was captured by security forces and his passport was seized before setting out for Austria and was barred from taking up academic studies at home and abroad. "People in distance" is the name of a black and white photography project implemented by Hossein Rajabian.

=== Filmography ===
==== Short ====
- So So (fiction, 2003, 6 minutes)
- Navigation (documentary, 2005, 43 minutes)
- To Revolution Square (documentary, 2006, 22 minutes)
- Some Redundant Word in The Dictionary (fiction, 2010, 20 minutes)
- Lines (documentary, 2010 to present)

==== Film Workshop ====
- Film Workshop The Experimental & Creatively attitude

==== Photography project ====
- People in distance is the name of a black and white photography project implemented by Hossein Rajabian.

==== Feature film scripts ====
- The stone falls in water (2009)
- The Upside-down Triangle (2011)
- Creation between Two Surfaces (2019)

==== Feature ====
- The Upside-down Triangle (fiction, 2016, 106 minutes)
- Creation between Two Surfaces (fiction, 2019, 95 minutes)

== Apprehension and court case ==
After finishing his first feature film, Rajabian was arrested by Iranian security forces on 5 October 2013 outside his office in Sari alongside two musicians, and was transferred to Ward 2-A of Evin Prison where all three of them were held in solitary confinement for more than two months and were threatened with televised confessions. He was released on bail (around $166,000) in mid-December, pending trial. Two years later, his case was heard at Branch 28 of Tehran Revolutionary Court which was presided over by Judge Moghisseh (Summer 2015). He was sentenced to six years in prison and fines for pursuing illegal cinematic activities, launching propaganda against the establishment and hurling insults at sanctities. On appeal, his sentence was changed to three years imprisonment and three years of suspended jail and fines.

== Imprisonment and hunger strike ==
Hossein Rajabian was sent to the ward 7 of Evin Prison in Tehran. After spending one third of his total period of imprisonment, he went on hunger strike to protest against unjust trial, lack of medical facilities, and transfer of his brother to another ward called section 8 of the same prison. During the first hunger strike period, which lasted 14 days, he was transferred to hospital because of pulmonary infection and he could not continue his hunger strike because of the interference of the representative of the prosecutor who was sent as an intermediary. After some time, he sent an open letter to the judicial authorities of Iran and went again on strike which brought him the support of international artists. After 36 days of hunger strike, he could convince the judicial authorities of Iran to review his case and grant him medical leave for the treatment of his left kidney suffered from infections and blood arising out of hunger strike. he, after a contentious struggle with the judicial officer of the prison was sent to the ward 8 for punishment. After spending three years in Evin Prison, he was finally released from Evin Prison under pressure from the world media and the reaction of human rights organizations around the world.

== Official reactions of the senior officials of the world ==
After imprisonment of Hossein Rajabian, senior officials of the world started to react officially to this sentence. For instance, Ban Ki-moon, secretary general of the United Nations, issued a special declaration about the human rights in the world. In the ninth page of the annual declaration, he refers to the conditions of Hossein Rajabian in the Iranian prisons, and asks the Iranian authorities to release this filmmaker unconditionally. UN Special Rapporteur for human rights in Iran Asma Jahangir, in her annual report called for the unconditional release of Hossein Rajabian and other prisoners in Iran. It can be referred to the protesting speech delivered by Wilfred Moore, the Canadian Liberal Senator in the senate against the Iranian authorities and in support of Hossein Rajabian. After the imprisonment of Hossein Rajabian, Åse Kleveland who is a Norwegian an artist and political leader declared her support to him, and asked for unconditional release of him and all artists imprisoned throughout the world. Following that, Philip Luther, the head of Amnesty International published an official video talking about Hossein Rajabian and asked all artists of the world to launch a worldwide campaign to support him. After organizing an international petition by the Amnesty International, Johnny Depp, the American actor, and Peter Gabriel, the well-known musician initiated a campaign with the motto "Art is not a Crime" to protest against censorship and support Rajabian and all other imprisoned artists.

A petition was signed by more than 12,000 people of different human right activists and artists addressing the Iranian authorities to review the judicial case of Rajabian and several other prisoners. Finally, the United Nations Human Rights Committee unanimously passed a resolution against Iranian government for the flagrant violation of human rights as a reaction to the collective hunger strike of Hossein Rajabian and seven other political and ideological prisoners of Evin Prison. Following that, the United States Senate extended the sanctions imposed on Iran for the violation of human rights for another ten years. The citizens of European countries initiated a supporting campaign and a sit-in in front of the Iranian Embassies in different countries while showing his photos. The annual report U.S. Department of State on Human Rights in Iran in 2016 cited the situation of prisoner filmmaker Hossein Rajabian.

== Film release in protest ==
In protest at his sentence and seizure of his film materials, Hossein Rajabian released the medium-quality copy of his film The Upside-down Triangle online. Creation between Two Surfaces his second film is in line with Iranian popular protests which culminated in November 2019, and was released on the internet for free in February 2020, as a show against censorship and in sympathy with the protesting people.

== Media reaction to court sentence ==
The news on the imprisonment of Hossein Rajabian, the Iranian artist, had globally great worldwide reflection, and it was covered by many news agencies including Washington Post, Guardian,Independent, Al-Arabiya, BBC, Le Figaro, CNN, Al Jazeera etc. The arrest and conviction of Hossein Rajabian was given extensive coverage by media outlets in Iran and other countries. In an exclusive interview, Amnesty International's Deputy Director for the Middle East and North Africa Said Boumedouha expressed objection to Rajabian's sentence. Afterwards, Amnesty International launched a global campaign and petition calling on all artists across the world to sign the petition and join the campaign. More than 20,000 artists from four corners of the world joined the campaign, chief among them musician-turned-actor Jared Leto, an Oscar winning actor, and Ai Weiwei, a Chinese contemporary artist and activist, Reza Deghati Iranian Photographer, keyhan kalhor Iranian musician, Nazanin Bonyadi Iranian-British Actress, Shirin Neshat Iranian-American Artist, Nasrin soutodeh Iranian activist & Lawyer, Bahman Ghobadi Kordish-Iranian Director, Shirin Ebadi Nobel Peace Prize winner and Jafar Panahi Iranian Director By Take Video and who released the news on their Twitter & Instagram and Facebook pages.

Earlier, other institutions such as PEN International, International Campaign for Human Rights [in Iran], European Council of Artists (ECA), the European Composer and Songwriter Alliance, Freemuse [Freedom of Musical Expression], etc. simultaneously released a statement calling on Iranian authorities to release Rajabian. In another move, as many as 165 individuals involved in media and cinema activities in Iran and foreign countries sent a letter to Minister of Culture and Islamic Guidance Ali Jannati, and UN Special Rapporteur for human rights in Iran Ahmed Shaheed, in his annual report called for the unconditional release of Hossein Rajabian and two other prisoners.

== See also ==
- Culture of Iran
- Islamic art
- Iranian art
- Iranian art and architecture
- List of Iranian artists

== Sources and external links ==
- Hossein Rajabian Official Website
- washington post
- Culture action europe
- International Film Festival Clermont Archived 25 April 2016 at the Wayback Machine
- The 10 Best Iranian Films of 2015
- ZH Magazine Archived 7 November 2017 at the Wayback Machine
- Hossein Rajabian youtube Channel
- Amnesty International
- washington post
- International Campaign for Human Rights in Iran
- culture action europe
- The Independent
- The Global Investigative Journalism Network
- Coverage by The Guardian of Hossein Rajabian’s sentence
- Coverage by The Winterswijkse Weekkrant of Hossein Rajabian sentence
- Coverage by PEN International of Hossein Rajabian’s sentence
- Coverage by Freemuse (165 Iranian artists and activists protest charges against two musicians and a filmmaker)
- Covereage by El Espanol of Hossein Rajabian's sentence
- Covereage by CNN Arabic
- Covereage by AL JAZEERA Arabic
- International Film Festival Clermont Archived 25 April 2016 at the Wayback Machine
- The 10 Best Iranian Films of 2015
- Hossein Rajabian youtube Channel
