= The Upside-down Triangle =

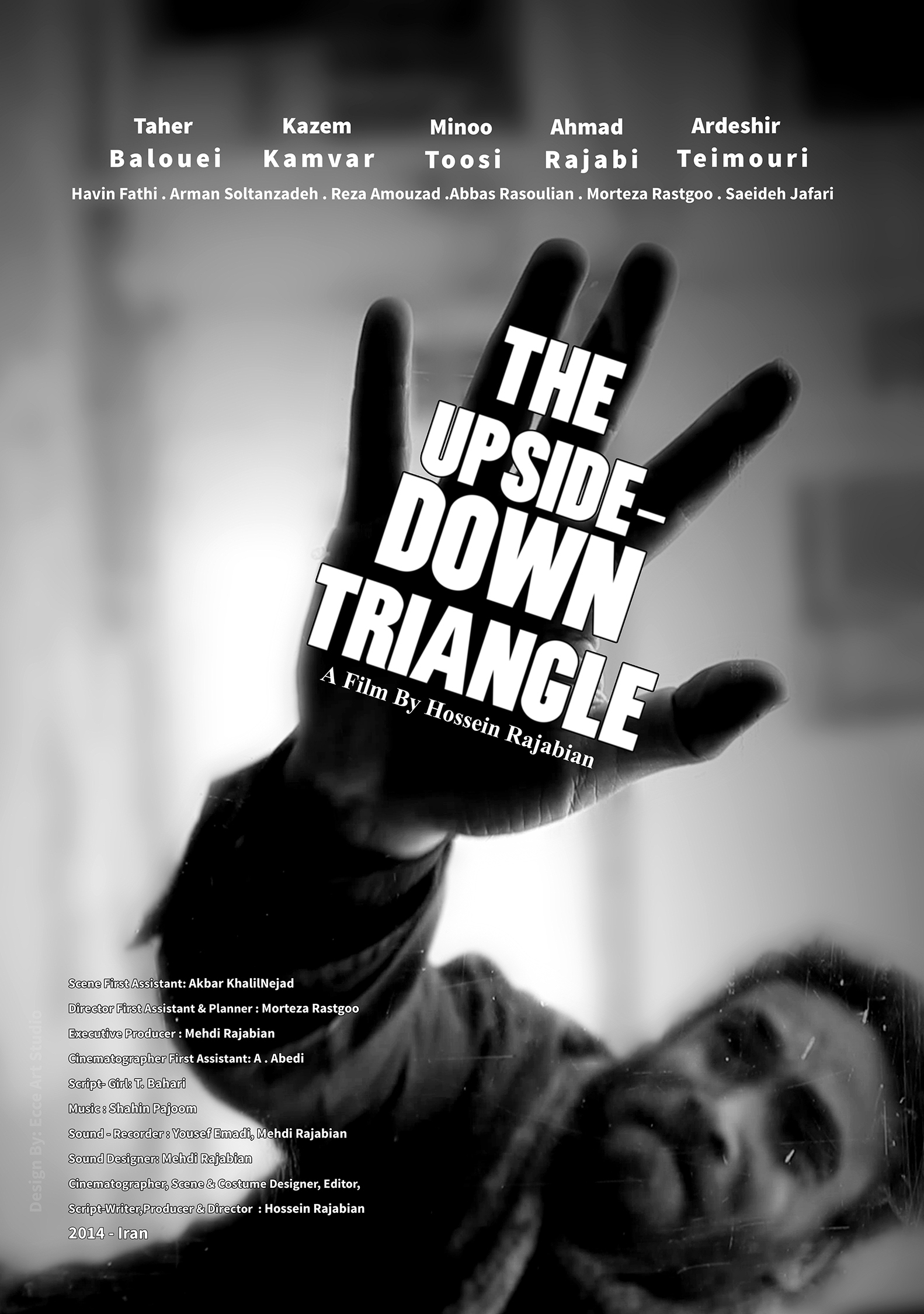
- The Upside-down Triangle Official Poster
- Directed by: Hossein Rajabian
- Produced by: Hossein Rajabian
- Cinematography: Hossein Rajabian
- Music by: Shahin Pajoom
- Production company: Barg Film. +Co
- Release date: 2016
- Running time: 106 minutes
- Country: Iran
- Language: Persian - Kurdish English

The Upside-down Triangle (Persian: مثلث واژگون) is the first feature film by Iranian independent filmmaker Hossein Rajabian. The black-and-white film has been shot and directed by Rajabian – who has been involved in photography for years – using digital cinema technology. The shooting of the film kicked off in mid-February 2013 and came to an end in early May 2013. Snowfall in Central Alborz in northern Iran and challenges associated with local arrangements led to the shooting being prolonged. This film was banned by Iranian government and has not been screened anywhere, any festival, etc.

== Synopsis ==
A man, regretting divorcing his wife, is seeking to win her over again. However, due to a complex Iranian marriage law, he cannot remarry her immediately. He asks a colleague of his to serve as a temporary husband before he can legally propose to his wife again. The agreement is made, but after getting married, his colleague is then unwilling to divorce. He takes his new spouse along with him on his professional mission which is to plant traffic signs along a derelict border road. The ex-husband learns about their trip, and decides to follow them...

== Production ==
The film's material was all following the arrest of Hossein Rajabian by security forces on October 5, 2013. As a result, The Upside-down Triangle, which was a licensed film, suffered inconsistency and underwent international distribution censorship before being able to be submitted for international film festivals, and public screening in Iran. The film was never screened and the film crew, including the director, has yet to watch it on the screen. The film's main material–among them the international band of the film's final sound–has yet to be given back to the producer Hossein Rajabian. Following his arrest, Rajabian spent two months in solitary confinement in Ward 2-A of Evin prison and was threatened with televised confessions. He was released on bail (around $166,000) in mid-December, pending trial. Two years later, his case was heard at Branch 28 of Tehran Revolutionary Court which was presided over by Judge Moghisseh (Summer 2015). He was sentenced to six years in prison for pursuing illegal cinematic activities, launching propaganda against the establishment and hurling insults at sanctities. On appeal, his sentence was reduced to three years imprisonment and three years of suspended jail.

== Censorship ==
The Upside-down Triangle was first reviewed by Iranian security forces together with two film directors whose identities were never revealed. The original 106-minute film, which was reduced to 80-minutes during the review process, finally managed to secure the go-ahead for screening from the Cinema Department of the Ministry of Culture and Islamic Guidance. The license would allow the director to present a 72-minute version of the film which has been re-edited under a new title (Sky Reaches the Earth), but this failed to affect the fate of the film one way or another. Currently the longest version of the film is a 90-minute copy with a medium quality which has been pieced together after the review process, with 10 minutes of the film failing to secure the nod of related officials. The fate of the remaining 16 minutes of the master copy – which was part of the confiscated hardware and has yet to be given back to the director – still hangs in the balance. On various grounds, including reviewing, parts of the film – 34 minutes in total – have landed on the cutting room floor.

== Release ==
In protest at his six-year prison term and in support for two members of his crew–namely Mehdi Rajabian, the sound designer and Yousef Emadi, the sound recordist who had been arrested and convicted along with the director – Hossein Rajabian released a free version of his film online in Spring 2016.

== Gallery ==
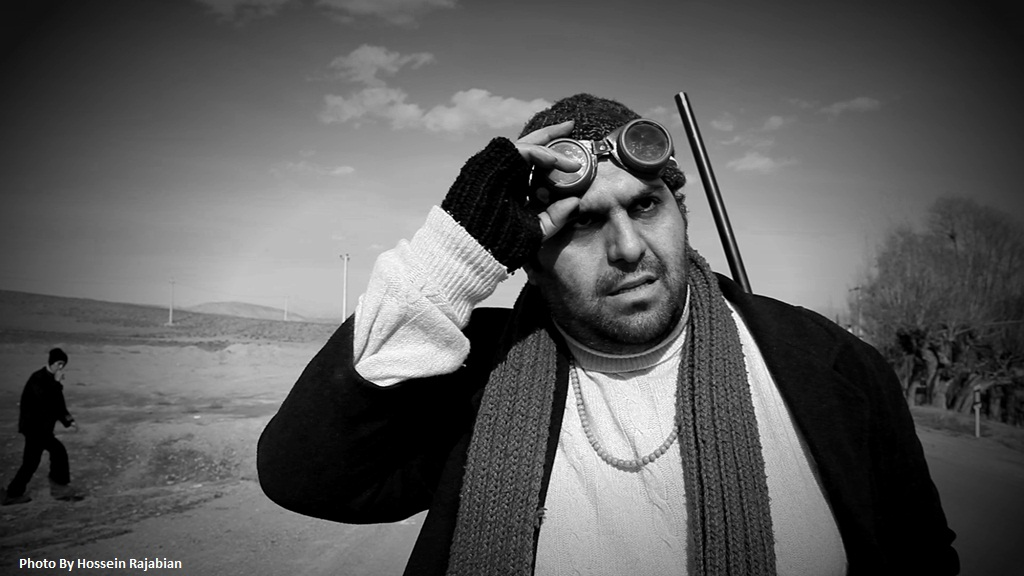

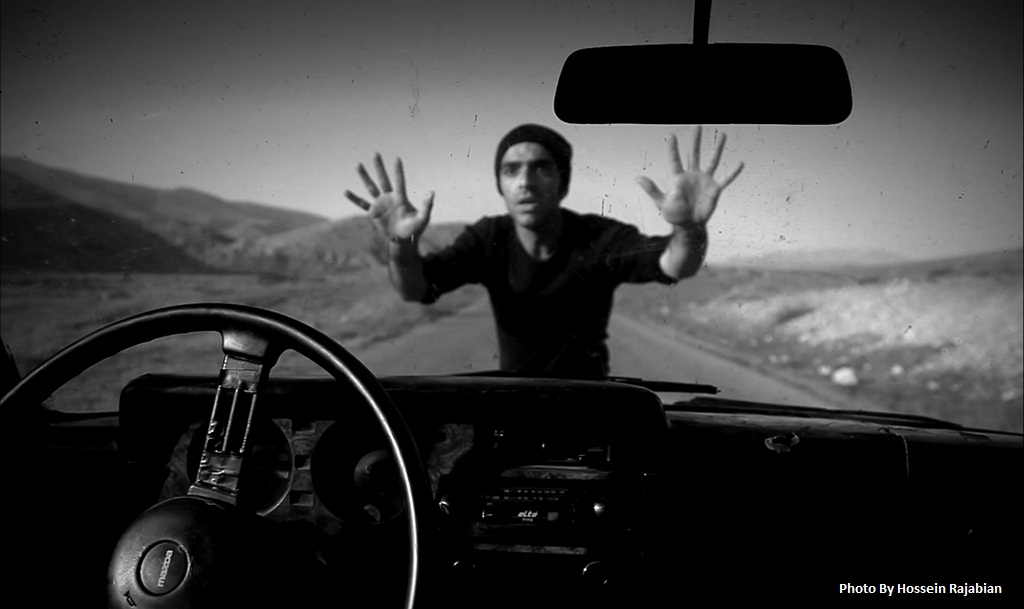

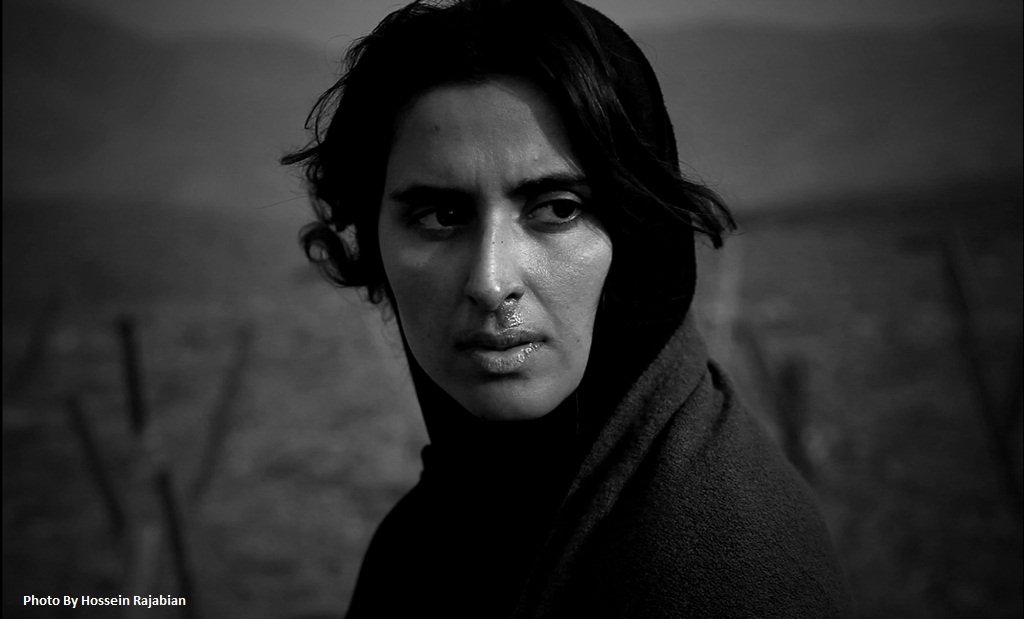

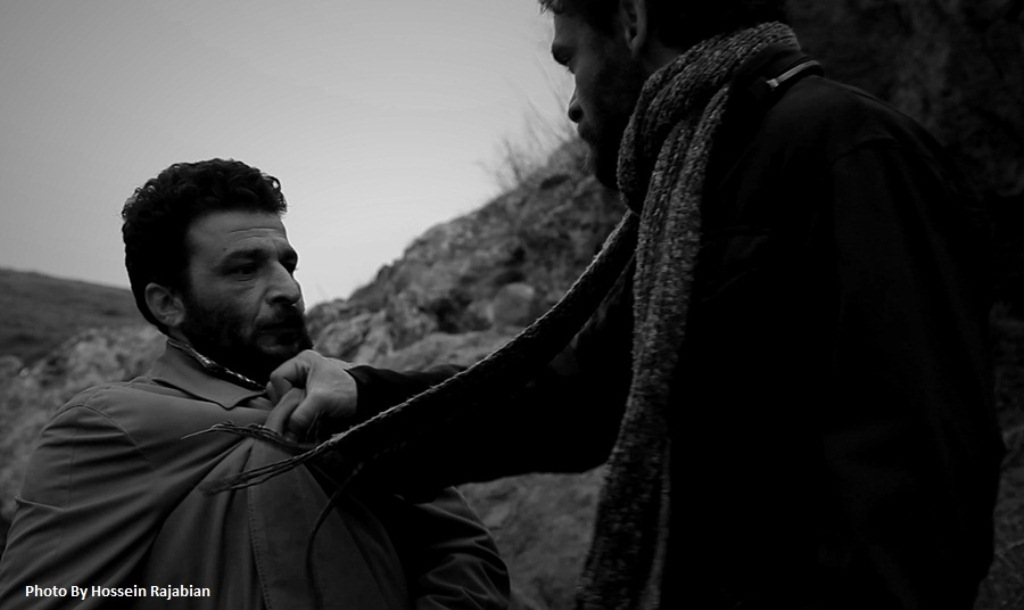

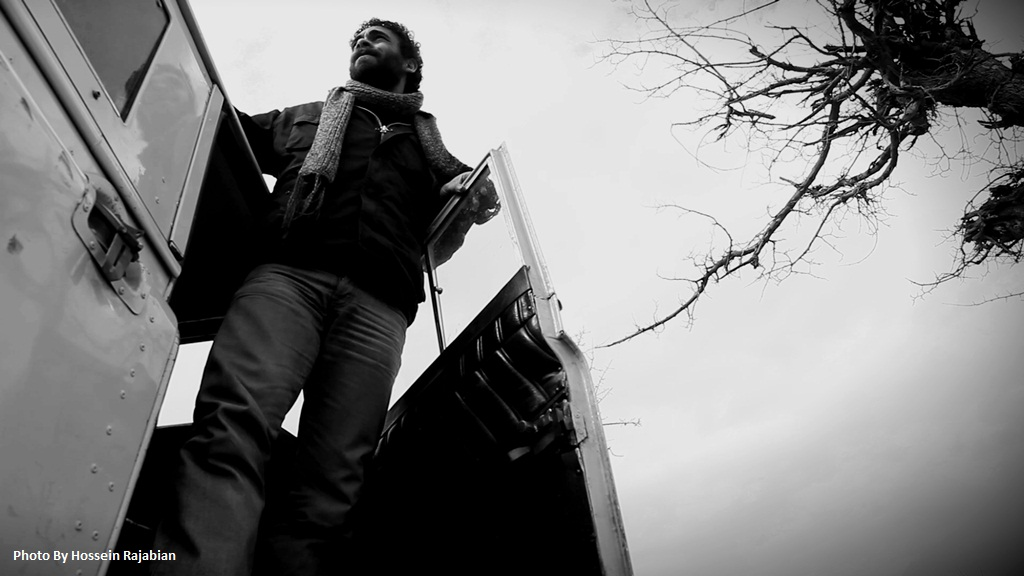

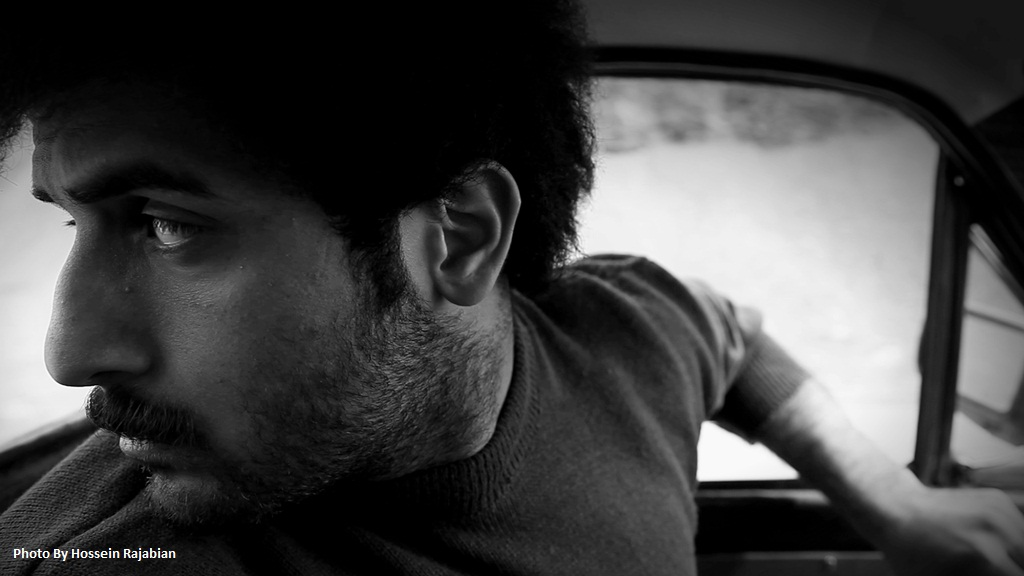

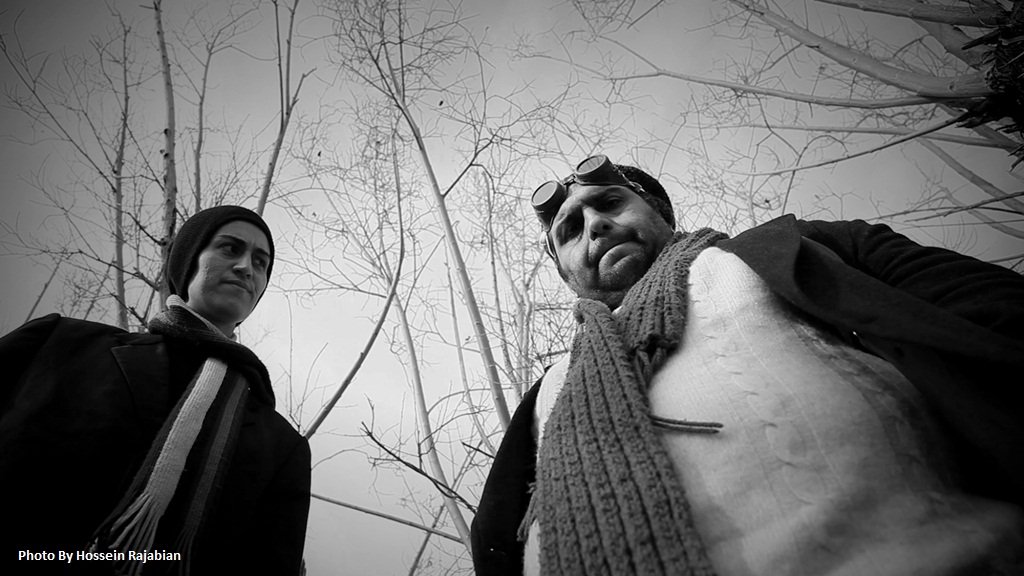

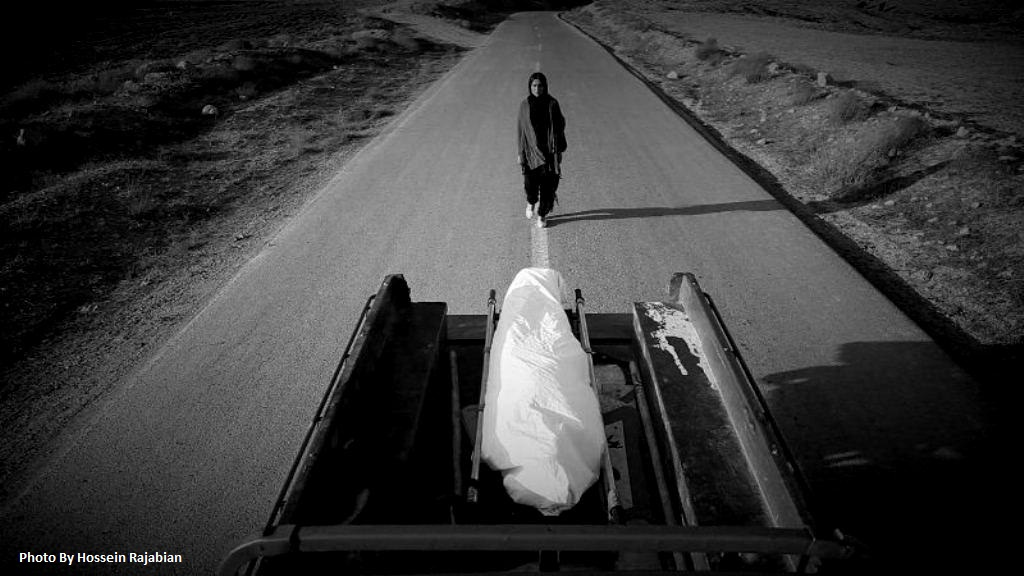

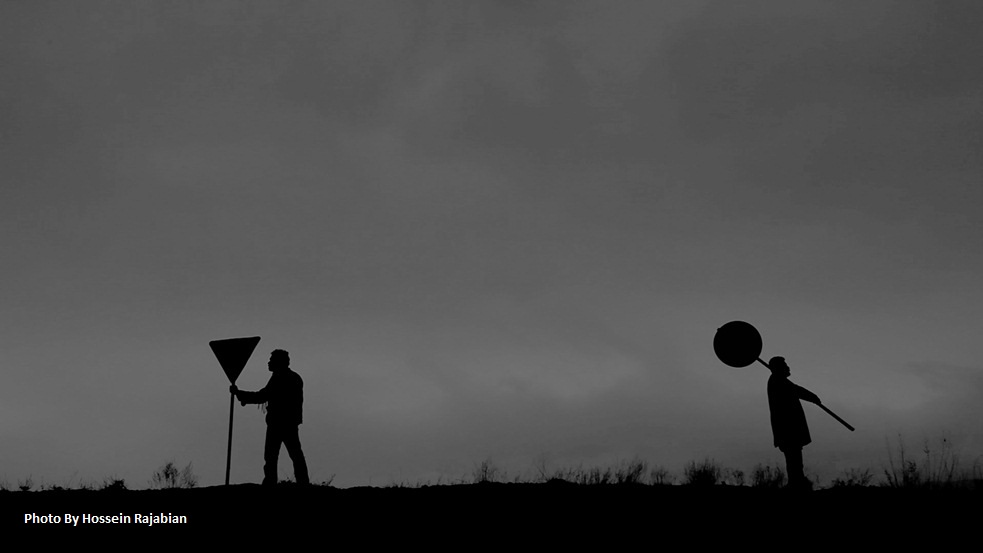

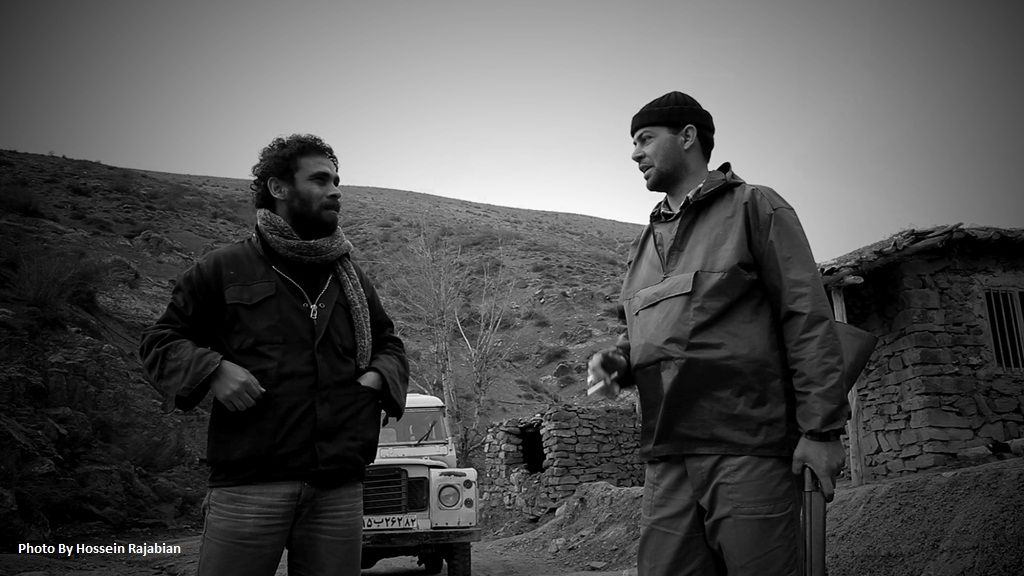

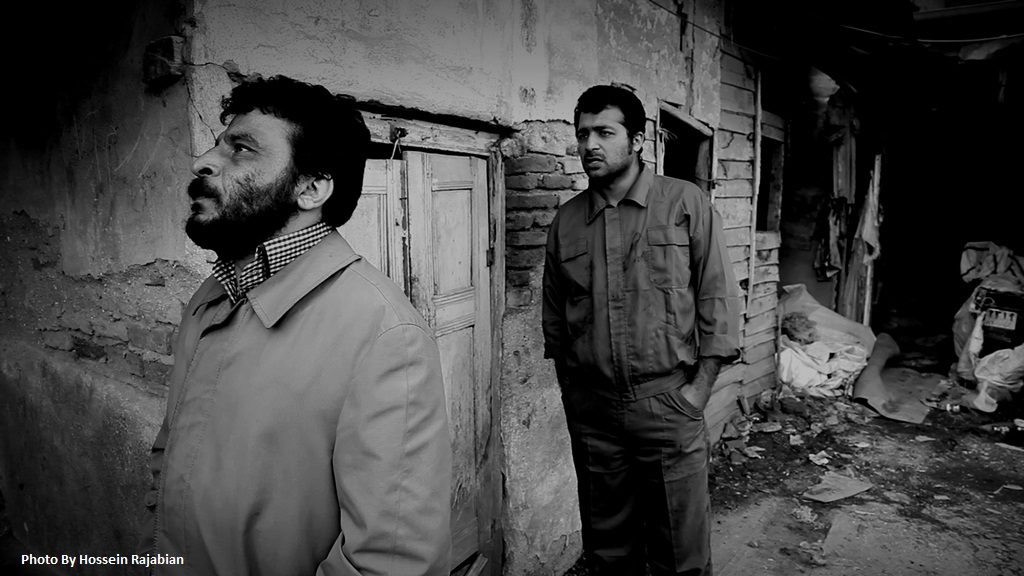

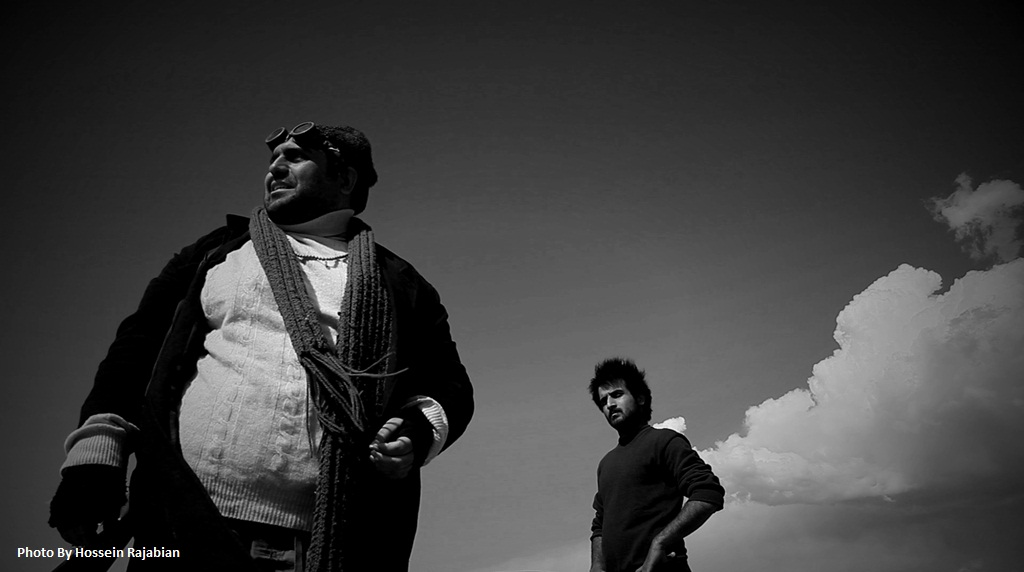

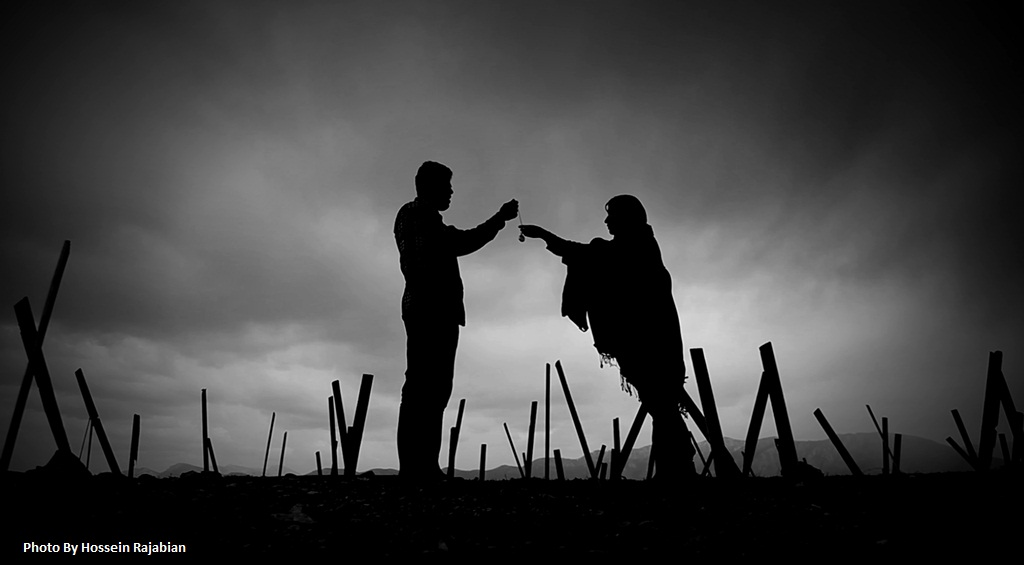

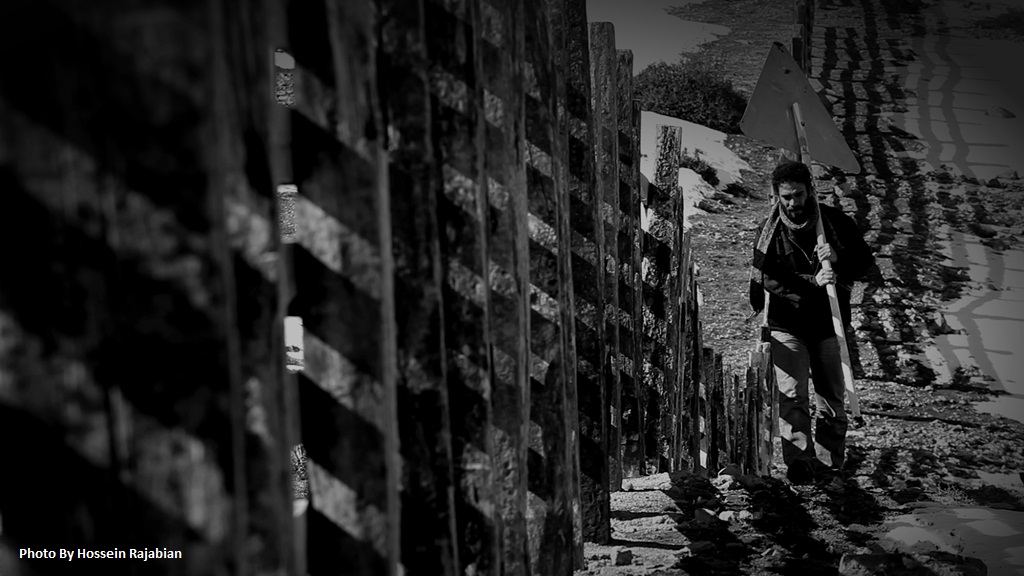

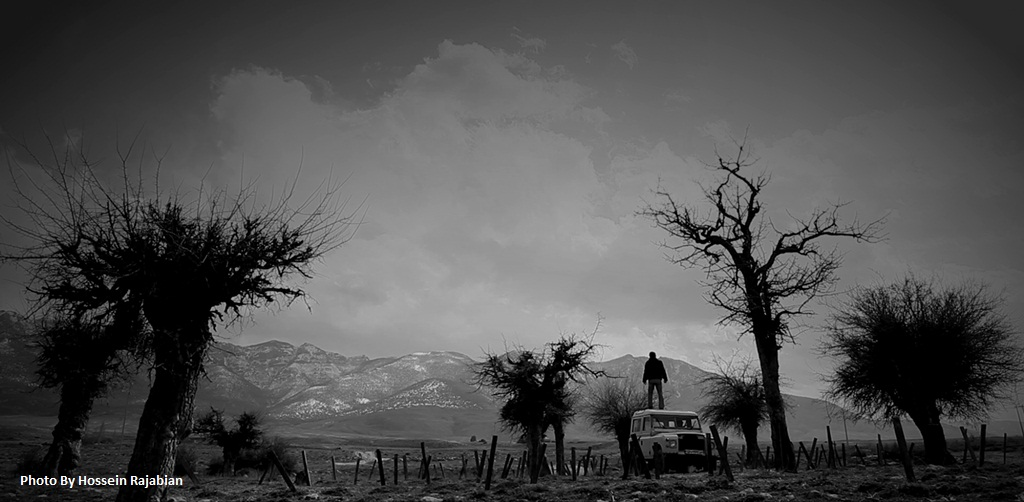

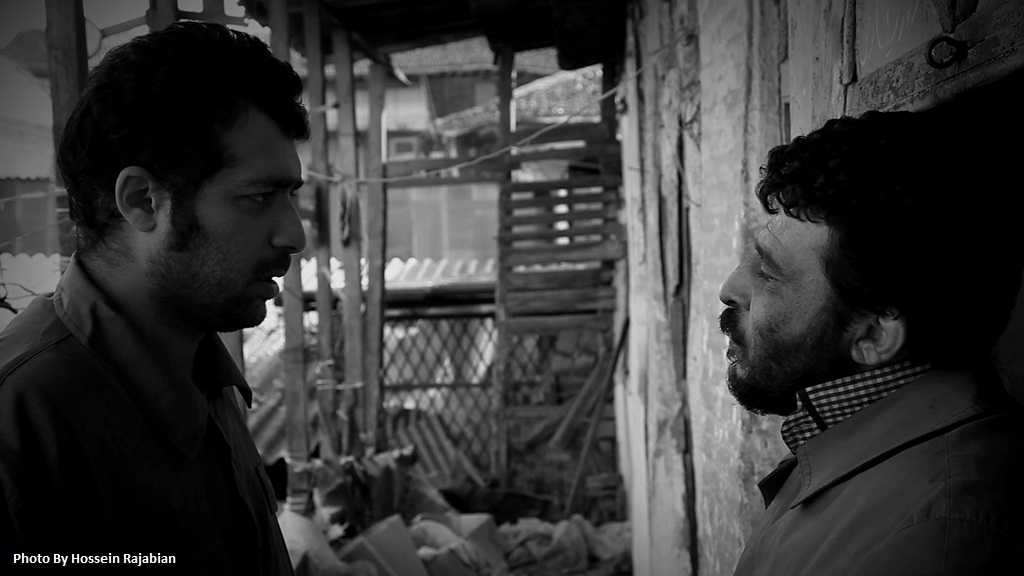

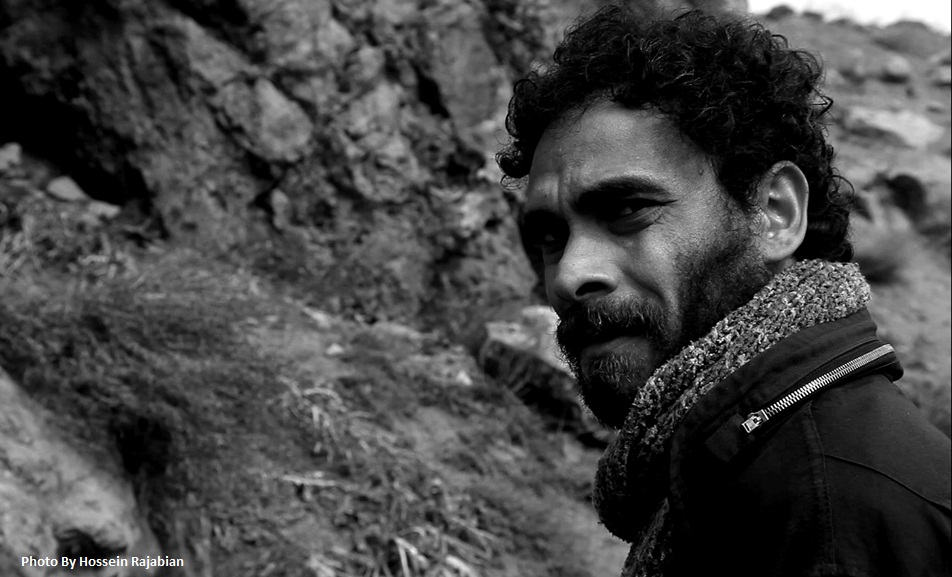

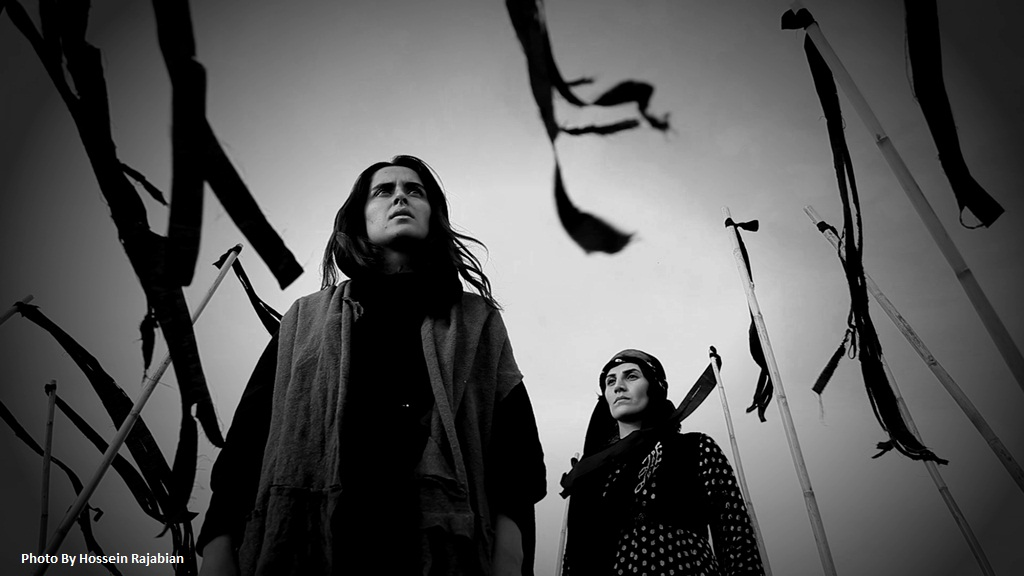

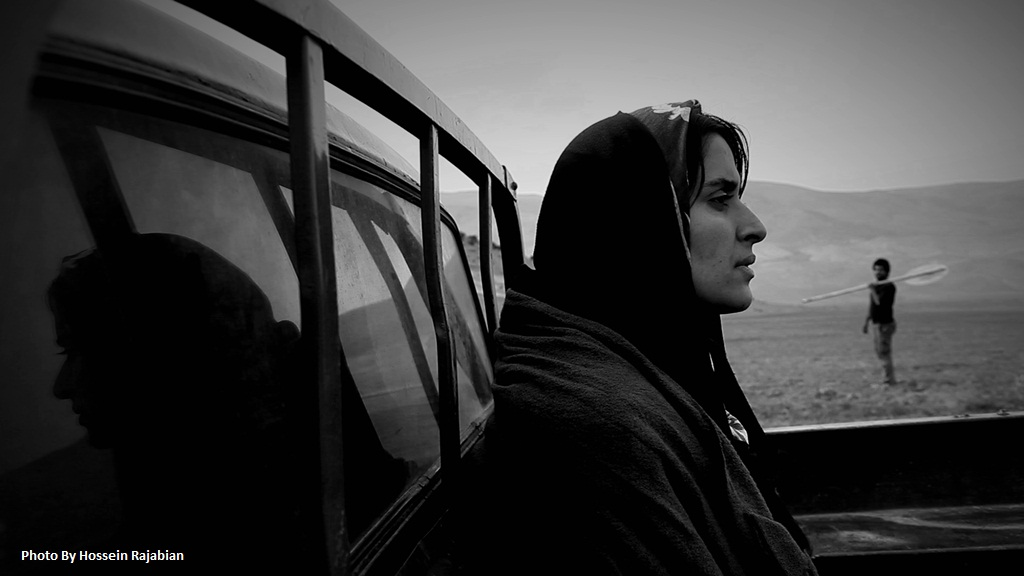

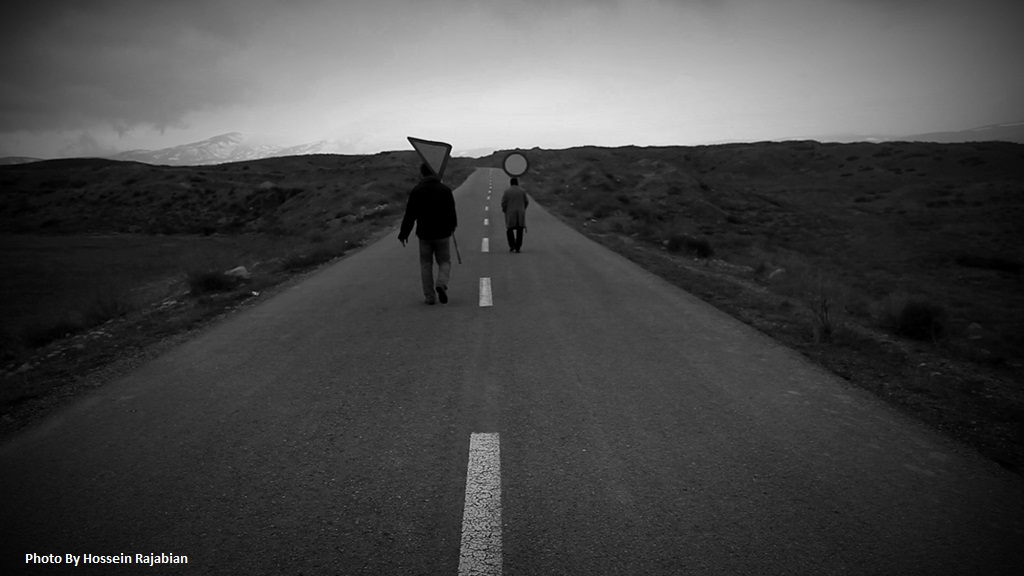

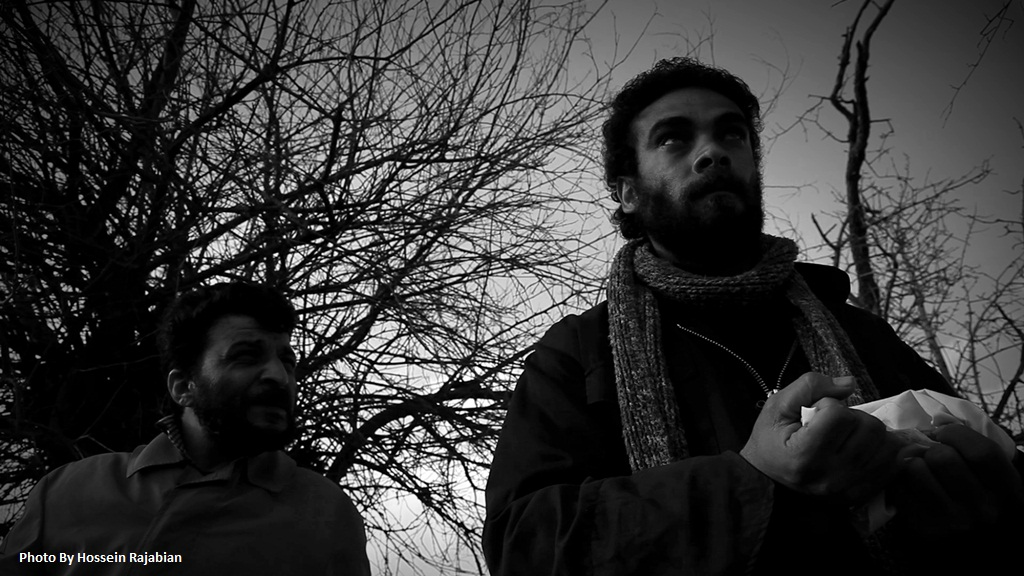

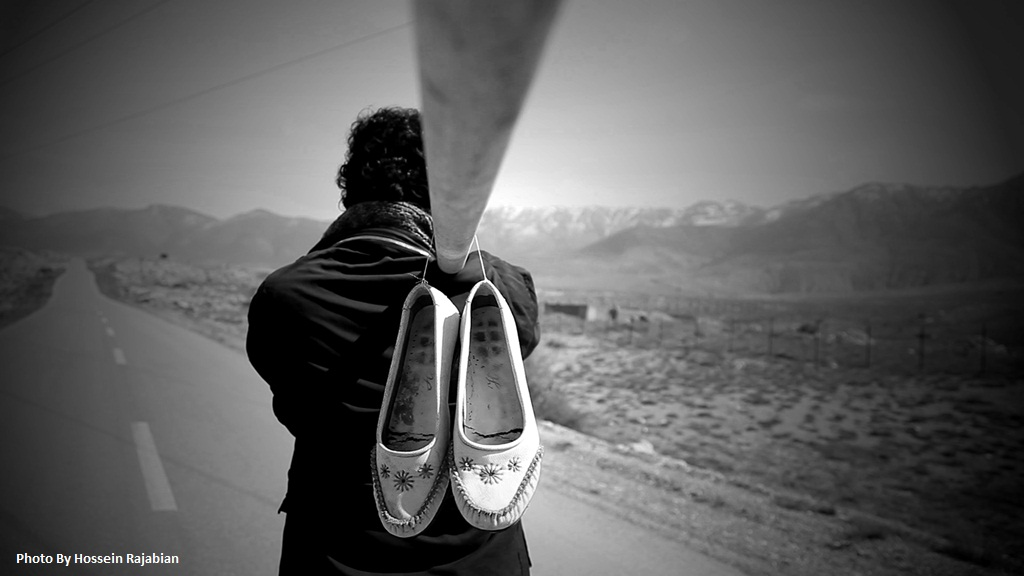

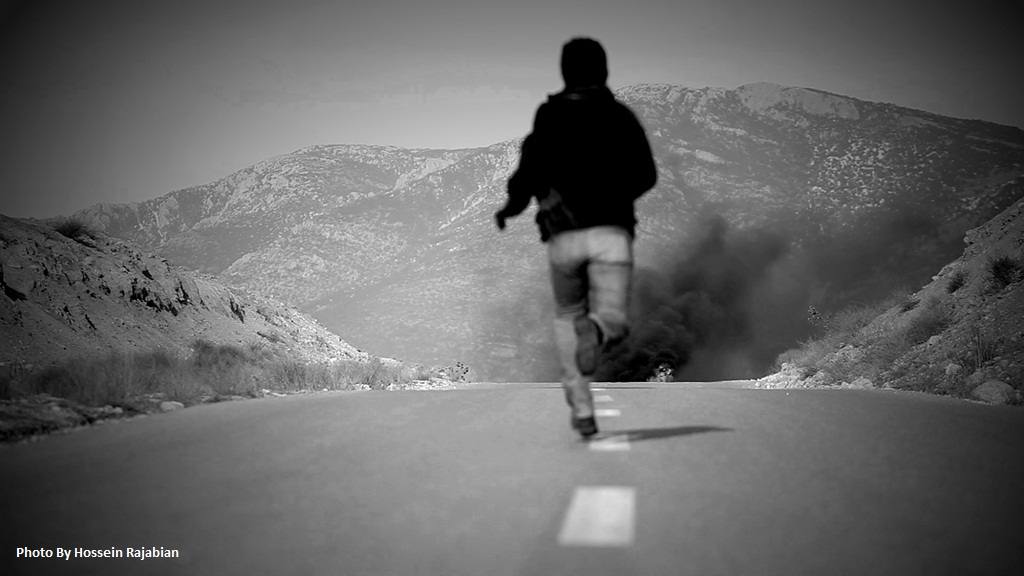

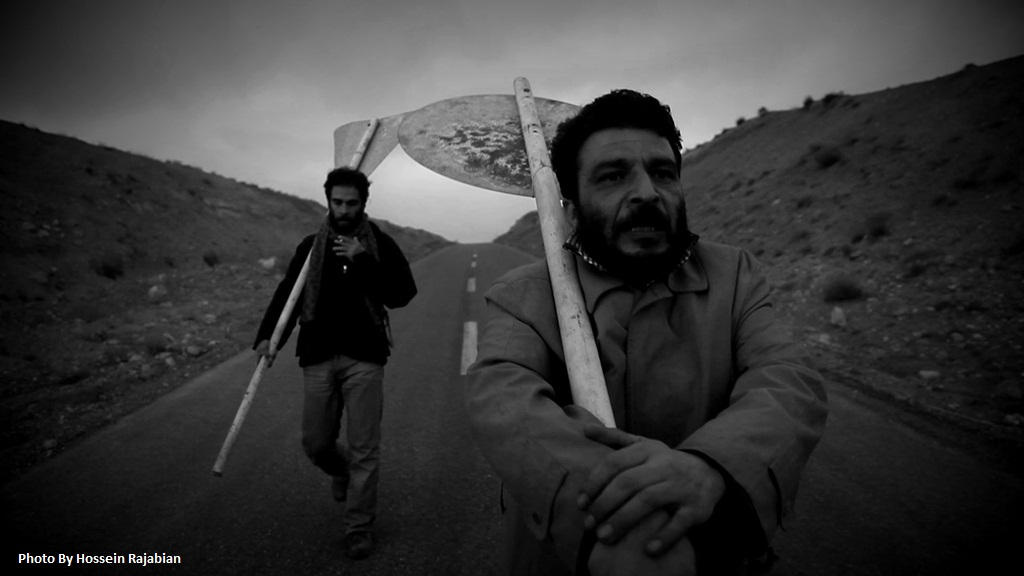

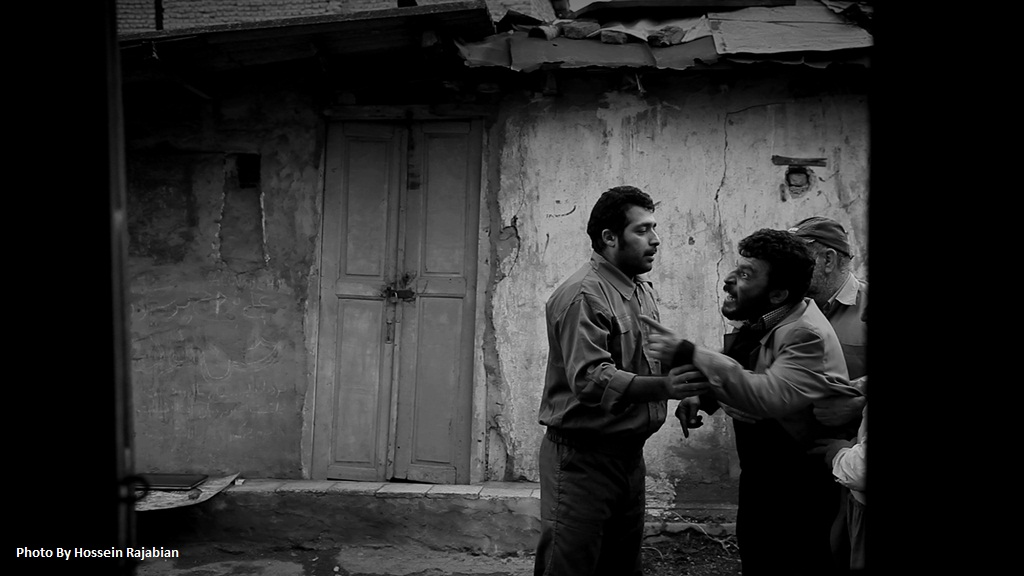

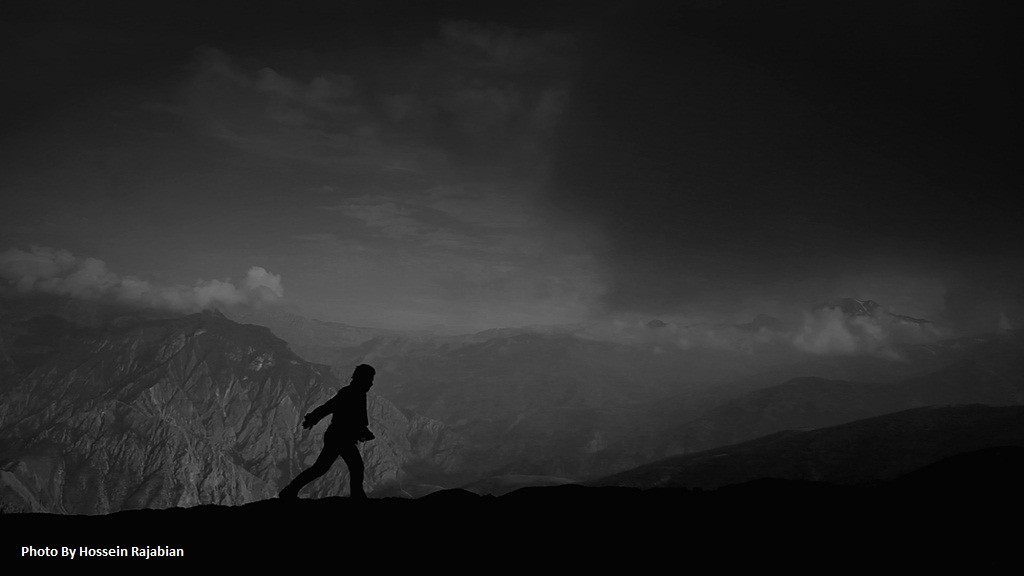

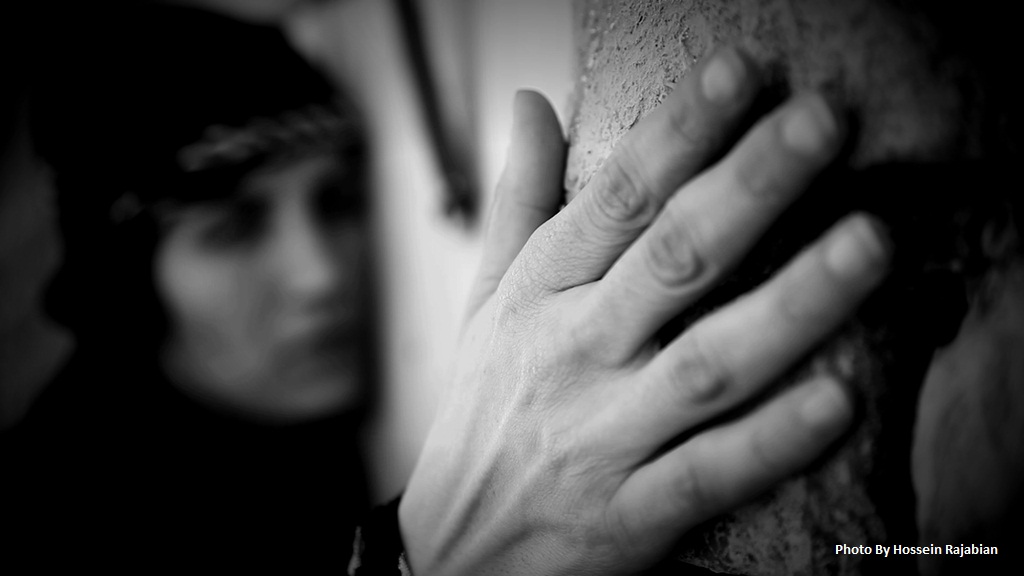

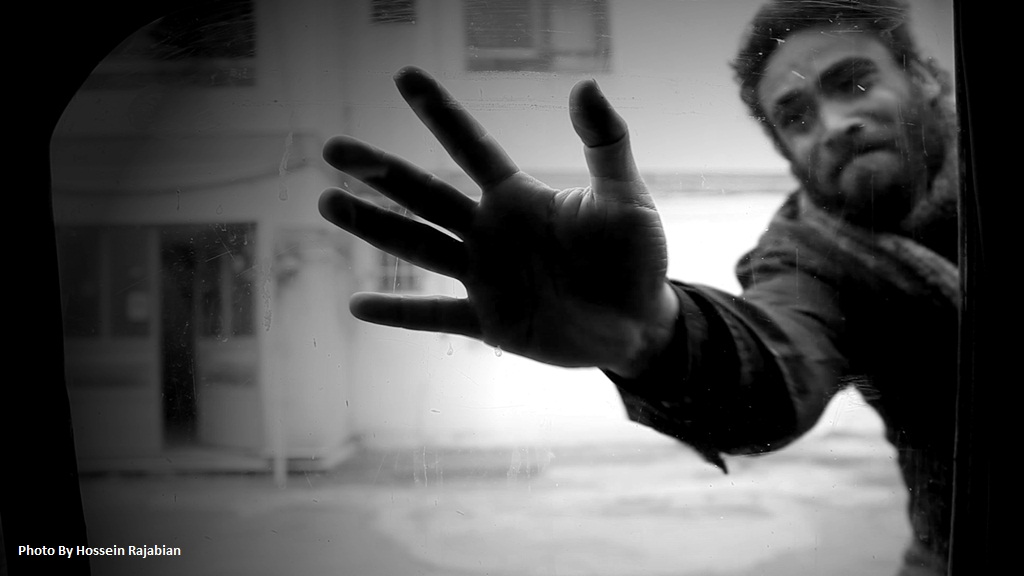
