= Hussein =

Arabic name: given name, surname

Hussein حُسَيْن
- Pronunciation: English: /huːˈseɪn/ hoo-SAYN; Arabic: [ħuˈsajn] Egyptian Arabic: [ħeˈseːn, ħoˈseːn] Algerian Arabic: [huːˈsiːn] Persian: [hoˈsejn] Turkish: [hyseˈjin]
- Gender: Male

Origin
- Language: Arabic
- Meaning: good, handsome, beautiful
- Region of origin: Arabia

Other names
- Related names: Hassan, Houssin, Hosein, Husseini, Ousseni, Ousseynou

Hussein, Hossein, Hussain, Hossain, Huseyn, Hüseyin, Husayn, Husein, Hussin, Hosein, Houssein, Husejin, Husseyn, Hüseyn, Usain, Hussayn, Hussien, or Husain is a masculine given name of Arabic origin. It comes from the triconsonantal root ḥ-s-n (ح س ن), which is the diminutive of the given name Hassan. It means "good", "handsome", or "beautiful" in Arabic. Notable people with the name include:

== Given name ==
=== Hosain ===
- Hosain Sabag (born 1937), Chilean politician

=== Hosein ===
- Hosein Amiri-Domari (born 1994), Iranian screenwriter and director
- Hosein Qoli Khan Badkubeh (1774–1845), Khan of Baku
- Hosein Khajeh-Hosseiny (born 1964), British-Iranian investor, venture capitalist, and philanthropist
- Hosein Lorzade (1906–2004), Iranian architect
- Hosein Rashti Najafi, Iraqi mujtahid, Shiite jurist, and theologian

=== Hossain ===
- Hossain Ali (born 1998), Bangladeshi cricketer
- Hossain Uddin Hossain (1941–2024), Bangladeshi essayist, novelist, and researcher
- Hossain Toufique Imam (1939–2021), Bangladeshi politician
- Hossain Zillur Rahman (born 1951), Bangladeshi academic, economist, and politician
- Hossain Rasouli (born 1995), Afghan Paralympic athlete
- Hossain Mokbul Shahriar (born 1974), Bangladeshi politician
- Hossain Uddin Shekhar, Bangladeshi biochemist

=== Hossein ===
- Hossein Abadian (born 1962), Iranian Iranologist and historian
- Hossein Abarghouei (born 1996), Iranian footballer
- Hossein Abdi (born 1967), Iranian football manager and player
- Hossein Abedini, Iranian actor
- Hossein Mortezaeian Abkenar (born 1967), Iranian writer and screenwriter
- Hossein Afarideh (born 1954), Iranian physicist and politician
- Hossein Hang Afarin (1878–1952), Iranian musician
- Hossein Afshin (born 1980), Iranian politician
- Hossein Khan Ajudanbashi (1798–??), Iranian military commander, diplomat, and politician
- Hossein Akbari (born 1950), Iranian tennis player
- Hossein Ala' (1881–1964), Iranian politician
- Hossein Alaei (born 1956), Iranian Army officer
- Hossein Alavi (born 1989), Iranian footballer
- Hossein Alizadeh (born 1951), Iranian musician
- Hossein Alizadeh (cyclist) (born 1988), Iranian cyclist
- Hossein Allahkaram (born 1956), Iranian Army officer and pundit
- Hossein Amanat (born 1942), Iranian-Canadian architect
- Hossein Korani Ameli (1955–2019), Lebanese Shiite cleric and militant
- Hossein Jabal Amelian (died 2026), Iranian Army officer
- Hossein Amini (born 1966), Iranian-British screenwriter and film director
- Hossein Amir-Abdollahian (1964–2024), Iranian politician and diplomat
- Hossein-Ali Amiri (born 1967), Iranian jurist and politician
- Hossein Ansarian (born 1944), Iranian Shia cleric
- Hossein Ali Anvari, Iranian engineer and academic
- Hossein Ardabili (1297–1336), Iranian politician
- Hossein Hatefi Ardakani, Iranian businessman
- Hossein Kazempour Ardebili (1952–2020), Iranian diplomat and politician
- Hossein Aryanejad (born 1958), Iranian chess player
- Hossein Ashena (born 1980), Iranian football player and coach
- Hossein Ashtari (born 1959), Iranian Army officer
- Hossein Askari (born 1975), Iranian racing cyclist
- Hossein Askari (economist), British-Iranian scholar
- Hossein Aslani (1936–2020), Iranian-American composer
- Hossein Atashparvar (born 1952), Iranian writer and a literary critic
- Hossein Ayatollahi (1931–2001), Iranian Islamic scholar
- Hossein Badamaki (born 1981), Iranian footballer
- Hossein Baghlani (born 1990), Iranian footballer
- Hossein Baharvand (born 1972), Iranian biologist
- Hossein Bahrami (born 1995), Iranian footballer
- Hossein Banai, Iranian scout
- Hossein Bashiriyeh (born 1953), Iranian political scientist
- Hossein-Ali Bayat (1922–1979), Iranian Army officer and politician
- Hossein Ali Beg Bayat, Safavid diplomat
- Hossein Baziari (born 1994), Iranian footballer
- Hossein Behroozinia (born 1962), Iranian barbat and oud player
- Hossein Behzad (1894–1968), Iranian painter
- Hossein Taherzadeh Behzad (1889–1962), Iranian painter, calligrapher, educator, and carpet designer
- Hossein Kazemeyni Boroujerdi (born 1958), Iranian Ayatollah and prisoner
- Hossein Borujerdi (1875–1961), Iranian Twelver Shia cleric and marja'
- Hossein Charkhabi (born 1950), Iranian football coach
- Hossein Dadgar (1889–1971), Iranian politician
- Hossein Dehghan (born 1957), Iranian Army officer and politician
- Hossein Dehlavi (1927–2019), Iranian composer
- Hossein Derakhshan (born 1975), Iranian-Canadian blogger, journalist, and researcher
- Hossein Ebrahimi (born 1990), Iranian footballer
- Hossein Eghmaz (1945–2013), Iranian boxer
- Hossein Emamian (born 1977), Iranian footballer
- Hossein Ensan (born 1964), German-Iranian poker player
- Hossein Erfani (1942–2018), Iranian voice actor
- Hossein Eslambolchi (born 1957), Iranian-American businessman
- Hossein Eslami (born 1969), Iranian cyclist
- Hossein Fadaei (born 1955), Iranian politician
- Hossein Fakhraee (born 1947), Iranian neonatologist and pediatrician
- Hossein Faraki (born 1957), Iranian football player and a coach
- Hossein Fardoust (1917–1987), Iranian Army officer
- Hossein Farhady (born 1947), Iranian linguist
- Hossein Farmani, Iranian photographer
- Hossein Fatemi (1917–1954), Iranian scholar
- Hossein Fatemi (photographer) (born 1980), Iranian photojournalist
- Hossein Fatemi (psychiatrist), Iranian-American psychiatrist and neuroscientist
- Hossein Fazeli (born 1993), Iranian footballer
- Hossein Martin Fazeli, Iranian-Canadian filmmaker, writer, and educator
- Hossein Fekri (1924–2003), Iranian footballer
- Hossein Fereydoun (born 1957), Iranian politician
- Hossein Ghafourizadeh (1943–2022), Iranian sprinter
- Hossein Ghanbari (born 1988), Iranian footballer
- Hossein Gharib (born 1940), Iranian physician
- Hossein Gharibi (born 1969), Iranian diplomat
- Hossein Ghods-Nakhai (1894–1977), Iranian politician, diplomat, and poet
- Hossein Ghomi (born 1982), Iranian judoka
- Hossein Elahi Ghomshei (born 1940), Iranian scholar, philosopher, and author
- Hossein Ghorbanzadeh (born 1980), Iranian journalist and politician
- Hossein Gol-e-Golab (1895–1985), Iranian polymath, scholar, and musician
- Hossein Hafezian, Iranian political scientist and author
- Hossein-Ali Haji-Deligani (born 1962), Iranian politician
- Hossein Hamadani (1950–2015), Iranian Army officer
- Hossein Noori Hamedani (born 1925), Iranian Twelver Shi'a Marja'
- Hossein Pour Hamidi (born 1998), Iranian footballer
- Hossein Saffar Harandi (born 1953), Iranian politician
- Hossein Hashemi (born 1953), Iranian politician
- Hossein Hedayati (born 1963), Iranian businessman
- Hossein Heydari (born 1998), Iranian footballer
- Hossein Hooshyar (born 1984), Iranian football player and coach
- Hossein Hosseini (footballer, born 1988) (born 1988), Iranian footballer
- Hossein Hosseini (footballer, born 1992) (born 1992), Iranian footballer
- Hossein Hosseini (footballer, born 1995) (born 1995), Iranian footballer
- Hossein Gholi Khan Ilkhani (1821–1882), Iranian nobleman
- Hossein Jabbarzadegan (died 1997), Iranian basketball player
- Hossein Jadvar (born 1961), Iranian-American scientist, academic, author, lecturer, and inventor
- Hossein Jafarian (born 1944), Iranian cinematographer
- Hossein Jahanbanian (born 1976), Iranian cyclist
- Hossein Joudat (1892–1990), Iranian cultural, political, media, and literary figure
- Hossein Kaebi (born 1985), Iranian footballer
- Hossein Kalani (born 1945), Iranian footballer
- Hossein Kamali (born 1953), Iranian politician
- Hossein Kamaly, Iranian academic
- Hossein Kamyab (born 1995), Iranian footballer
- Hossein Kanaanizadegan (born 1994), Iranian footballer
- Hossein Karimi (born 1992), Iranian footballer
- Hossein Karimi (bodybuilder) (born 1992), Iranian bodybuilder
- Hossein Rasti Kashani (1927–2017), Iranian Shitte Ayatollah and politician
- Hossein Kazemi (born 1979), Iranian footballer
- Hossein Kazerani (born 1947), Iranian footballer
- Hossein Keyhani (born 1990), Iranian runner
- Hossein Khalatbari (1949–1985), Iranian fighter pilot
- Hossein Khalili (born 1956), Iranian Army officer
- Hossein Qoli Khan (1834–1914), Iranian politician
- Hossein Ali Khan-Sardar, Iranian footballer
- Hossein Khanzadi (born 1967), Iranian Army officer
- Hossein Khatibi (born 1975), Iranian football player and manager
- Hossein Kheyri (born 1994), Iranian footballer
- Hossein Khezri (1983–2011), Iranian activist
- Hossein Khodaparast (1938–2021), Iranian footballer
- Hossein Wahid Khorasani (1921–2026), Iranian author and Shia marja'
- Hossein Kiani (born 1975), Iranian playwright and theatre director
- Hossein Kohkan (1930–2016), Iranian architect
- Hossein Koushki (born 1984), Iranian footballer
- Hossein Lankarani (1895–1989), Iranian Shitte cleric and politician
- Hossein Lashkari (1953–2009), Iranian pilot and war prisoner
- Hossein Maadani (1971–2014), Iranian volleyball player and coach
- Hossein-Qoli Nezam al-Saltaneh Mafi (1832–1908), Iranian politician
- Hossein Mahdavy, Iranian economist and political scientist
- Hossein Maher (born 1957), Iranian painter and sculptor
- Hossein Mahini (born 1986), Iranian footballer
- Hossein Mahlouji (born 1947), Iranian politician
- Hossein Makki (1911–1999), Iranian politician, orator, and historian
- Hossein Malek (1925–1999), Iranian musician
- Hossein Malek-Afzali (born 1939), Iranian scientist and physician
- Hossein Agha Malek (1871–1972), Iranian philanthropist
- Hossein Maleki (born 1990), Iranian footballer
- Hossein Ali Mallah (1921–1992), Iranian musician, painter, and author
- Hossein-Ali Khan Moayyer ol-Mamalek (1798–1858), Qajar politician
- Hossein Marashi (born 1958), Iranian politician
- Hossein Mazaheri (born 1933), Iranian Twelver Shia Marja
- Hossein Mehraban (born 1996), Iranian footballer
- Hossein Ali Mirza (1789–1835), Qajar royal and politician
- Hossein Moarreb (born 1947), Iranian wrestler
- Hossein Modarressi, Iranian Islamic jurist and academic
- Hossein Molayemi (born 1982), Iranian animation director and designer
- Hossein Mollaghasemi (1933–2022), Iranian wrestler
- Hossein Monzavi (1946–2004), Iranian poet, essayist, and translator
- Hossein Khan Motamed (1893–1955), Iranian surgeon
- Hossein Mozaffar (born 1952), Iranian politician
- Hossein Naghavi-Hosseini (born 1960), Iranian politician
- Hossein Najmabadi, Iranian medical scientist
- Hossein Namazi (born 1945), Iranian economist and politician
- Hossein Nassehi (died 1977), Iranian composer and trombone player
- Hossein Nassim (born 1952), Iranian swimmer
- Hossein Nateghi (born 1987), Iranian cyclist
- Hossein Navab (1897–1972), Iranian diplomat
- Hossein Nejabat (born 1953), Iranian politician
- Hossein Nejat (born 1955), Iranian Army officer
- Hossein Niknam (born 1951), Iranian fencer
- Hossein Nokhodkar (born 2002), Iranian footballer
- Hossein Fallah Noshirvani (1902–??), Iranian businessman and philanthropist
- Hossein Nouri (wrestler, born 1931) (1931–1980), Iranian wrestler
- Hossein Nouri (wrestler, born 1990) (born 1990), Iranian wrestler
- Hossein Nuri (born 1954), Iranian artist
- Hossein Ojaghi (born 1975), Iranian wushu athlete and sanshou fighter
- Hossein Omoumi (1944–2026), Iranian-American musician
- Hossein Pakdel, Iranian actor, theatre director, producer, playwright, and television presenter
- Hossein Panahi (1956–2004), Iranian actor
- Hossein Papi (born 1985), Iranian footballer
- Hossein Pashaei (born 1979), Iranian footballer
- Hossein Pirnia (1875–1948), Iranian politician
- Hossein Pouramini (born 1990), Iranian footballer
- Hossein Qoli Khan Qajar (1751–1777), Qajar chieftain
- Hossein Qajeyi (1958–1982), Iranian Army officer
- Hossein Qollar-Aqasi (1902–1966), Iranian painter
- Hossein Rabbi (born 1947), Iranian long-distance runner
- Hossein Radaei (born 1968), Iranian politician
- Hossein Rafiee (born 1945), Iranian scholar, activist, and author
- Hossein Rahnama, Canadian computer scientist
- Hossein Rajabian (born 1984), Iranian filmmaker
- Hossein Rasouli (born 1999), Iranian discus thrower
- Hossein Ravazadeh (born 1956), Iranian physician
- Hossein Rezai (born 1956), Iranian-Singaporean structural engineer and educator
- Hossein Rezazadeh (born 1978), Iranian weightlifter
- Hossein Rajaei Rizi, Iranian politician
- Hossein Ronaghi (born 1985), Iranian human rights activist and blogger
- Hossein Rouhani (born 1983), Iranian karateka
- Hossein Hassani Sa'di (born 1940/41), Iranian Army officer
- Hossein Saberi (born 1966), Iranian academic, translator, and researcher
- Hossein Sabet (born 1934), Iranian businessman
- Hossein Sabouri (born 1978), Iranian futsal coach and player
- Hossein Sadaghiani (1903–1982), Iranian football player and manager
- Hossein Sadri (born 1979), Iranian scholar, activist, and architect
- Hossein Sajedinia (born 1962), Iranian Army officer
- Hossein Saki (born 1997), Iranian footballer
- Hossein Salami (1960–2025), Iranian Army general
- Hossein Sami'i (1876–1954), Iranian writer, poet, diplomat, and politician
- Hossein Samsami (born 1967), Iranian politician and economist
- Hossein Sanapour (born 1960), Iranian writer
- Hossein Saoudipour (1922–2017), Iranian medical doctor, basketball player, and basketball coach
- Hossein Mesgar Saravi (born 1957), Iranian football player and coach
- Hossein Khan Sardar (1742–1831), Iranian politician
- Hossein Simaee Sarraf (born 1968), Iranian lawyer, politician, and academic
- Hossein Sarshar (1931–1992), Iranian opera singer and actor
- Hossein Shah-Hosseini (1928–2017), Iranian politician
- Hossein Shahabi (1967–2023), Iranian film director, screenwriter, and film producer
- Hossein Ali Shahriari (born 1951), Iranian physician and politician
- Hossein Khan Shahsevan (died 1875), Iranian military commander and politician
- Hossein Shahshahani (1895–1962), Iranian judge and scholar
- Hossein Shamkhani, Iranian businessman
- Hossein Beg Laleh Shamlu (1452–1514), Qizilbash Army officer
- Hossein Shams (born 1961), Iranian futsal coach and footballer
- Hossein Shanbehzadeh, Iranian writer and activist
- Hossein Shariatmadari (born 1948), Iranian newspaper editor
- Hossein Shayan (born 1971), Iranian athlete
- Hossein Sheikholeslam (1952–2020), Iranian politician and diplomat
- Hossein Saveh Shemshaki (born 1985), Iranian alpine skier
- Hossein Shenani (born 1993), Iranian footballer
- Hossein Soltani (born 1999), Iranian weightlifter
- Hossein Soroudi (1925–1992), Iranian football and basketball player
- Hossein Tabib (1927–??), Iranian dentist and politician
- Hossein Abdoh Tabrizi (born 1951), Iranian economist and academic
- Hossein Mousavi Tabrizi (born 1947), Iranian Shiite mujtahid, writer, researcher, judge, and politician
- Hossein Taeb (born 1963), Iranian Army officer and Shiite cleric
- Hossein Tahami (1942/43–2007), Iranian freestyle wrestler
- Hossein Taheri (1941–2010), Iranian politician
- Hossein Tala (born 1969), Iranian politician
- Hossein Tavakkoli (born 1978), Iranian weightlifter
- Hossein Tayyebi (born 1988), Iranian futsal player
- Hossein Tehrāni (1912–1974), Iranian musician
- Hossein Towfigh (1929–2017), Iranian journalist, satirist, and editor
- Hossein Vafaei (born 1994), Iranian snooker player
- Hossein Valamanesh (1949–2022), Iranian-Australian artist
- Hossein Yari (born 1968), Iranian actor
- Hossein Yassaie, British-Iranian entrepreneur and investor
- Hossein Yazdi (1934–2021), Iranian spy
- Hossein Zakeri (born 1942), Iranian mathematician
- Hossein Zamani (born 2002), Iranian-Afghan footballer
- Hossein Zamehran (born 1992), Iranian footballer
- Hossein Zenderoudi (born 1937), French-Iranian painter, calligrapher, and sculptor
- Hossein Ziai (1944–2011), Iranian-American academic

=== Houssein ===
- Houssein Djama (born 1968), Djiboutian athlete
- Houssein Gaber Ibrahim (born 1999), Djiboutian swimmer
- Houssein Rizk (born 1997), Lebanese footballer

=== Housseine ===
- Housseine Zakouani (born 1998), French-Comorian footballer

=== Housseini ===
- Housseini Amion Guindo (born 1970), Malian politician

=== Husain ===
- Husain Abdullah (born 1985), American football player
- Husain Ali (born 1981), Bahraini footballer
- Husain Jaafar Almandeel (1931–2008), Bahraini educator, public servant, and political figure
- Husain Ali Khan Bahadur, Indian Nawab of Banganapalle
- Husain Bey, Crown Prince of Tunisia (1893–1969), Tunisian royal
- Husain Burhanuddin (born 1977), Indian Qari and Islamic leader
- Husain Shah Chak (died 1571), Kashmiri sultan
- Husain Dalwai (born 1943), Indian politician
- Husain Faizkhanov (1823–1866), Russian-Tatar historian, philologist, and teacher
- Husain Haqqani (born 1956), Pakistani journalist, political activist, and diplomat
- Husain Mohammad Jafri (1938–2019), Pakistani historian
- Husain Ali Khan, Indian Nawab of Masulipatam
- Husain Yawar Khan I (died 1880), Indian Nawab of Cambay
- Husain ibn Kharmil (died 1208), Iranian military leader
- Husain Ahmad Madani (1879–1957), Indian Islamic scholar
- Husain Mahfoodh (born 2001), Bahraini handball player
- Husain Al-Musallam (born 1960), Kuwaiti sports administrator and airline pilot
- Husain Al-Qaidoom (born 1986), Bahraini handball player
- Husain al-Radi (1924–1963), Iraqi politician, poet, and painter
- Husain al-Rahhal (1900/01–1971), Iraqi translator, journalist, and politician
- Husain Al-Sayyad (born 1988), Bahraini handball player
- Husain Shah of Jaunpur (died 1505), Sultan of Jaunpur
- Husain Sirhan (died 1993), Saudi poet
- Husain Syah of Tidore (born 1964), Indonesian sultan and politician
- Husain Yusof (1918–2010), Bruneian educator

=== Husaini ===
- Husaini Abdullahi (1939–2019), Nigerian Army officer and politician
- Husaini Omar (born 1963), Malaysian academic, geologist, researcher, and engineer

=== Husayn ===
- Husayn of Zaragoza (died 781), Andalusian wali
- Husayn ibn Ali (626–680), Arab grandson of the Prophet Muhammad
- Husayn Fawzi Alnajjar (1918–2003), Egyptian historian, political scientist, and Islamic scholar
- Husayn Bayqarah (1438–1506), Timurid ruler of Herat
- Husayn Abd al-Hadi (died 1835/36), Ottoman governor
- Husayn ibn Hamdan (died 918), Abbasid general
- Husayn Ali Jum'ah (born 1949), Syrian literary scholar and poet
- Husayn Kashifi (1436–1504), Persian poet, Quranic exegete, Sufi scholar, and astronomer
- Husayn Ali Khan (Quba khan) (1709–1758), Khan of Quba
- Husayn Kharrazi (1957–1987), Iranian Army officer
- Husayn Pasha ibn Makki (died 1765), Ottoman wali
- Husayn Muruwwa (1909–1987), Lebanese philosopher, journalist, author, and literary critic
- Husayn Pasha (died 1663), Ottoman governor
- Husayn Rosowsky (born 1991), British foil fencer
- Husayn al-Sadr (born 1952), Iraqi Grand Ayatollah
- Husayn ibn Numayr al-Sakuni (died 686), Umayyad general
- Husayn Khing Sawar (died 1202), Indian sayyid
- Husayn al-Shami, Lebanese politician
- Husayn Thabit (1860–1917), Iraqi-Iranian nobleman, writer, and politician

=== Husayni ===
- Husayni Isfahani, Persian physician and scientist

=== Husein ===
- Husein Hasanally Abdoolcader (1890–1974), Indian-Malaysian barrister and politician
- Husein Aidid (1913–1965), Indonesian singer, songwriter, and entrepreneur
- Husein Alić (1892–1962), Bosnian Nazi collaborator
- Husein Alicajic, Australian filmmaker
- Husein Alireza (born 1993), Saudi rower
- Husein Balić (born 1996), Austrian footballer
- Husein Beganović (born 1971), Macedonian footballer
- Husein Cumber (born 1975), American businessman
- Husein Demiri (born 1995), Macedonian footballer
- Husein Farah Dodi (died 2019), Somali politician
- Husein Đozo (1912–1982), Bosnian Islamic theologian, activist, and Nazi collaborator
- Husein Dubravić (1880–1961), Bosnian writer, historian, teacher, and publisher
- Husein Gradaščević (1802–1834), Ottoman Army commander and rebel
- Husein Hasanefendić (born 1954), Croatian musician, songwriter, and music producer
- Husein Huseinov (born 1951), Turkmen painter
- Husein Jašarević (1914–1979), Bosnian footballer
- Husein Kavazović (born 1964), Bosnian Grand Mufti
- Husein Madhavji, Indian-Canadian actor and television personality
- Husein Mehmedov (1924–2014), Turkish-Bulgarian wrestler
- Husein Memić (born 1983), Serbian politician
- Husein Miljković (1905–1944), Bosnian military commander
- Husein Mujić (1918–1993), Bosnian Grand Mufti
- Husein Mutahar (1916–2004), Indonesian diplomat and composer
- Husein Rovčanin (1907–1944), Bosnian Nazi collaborator

=== Husejin ===
- Husejin Biščević (1884–??), Bosnian Army officer

=== Huseyin ===
- Huseyin Arslan, Turkish-American engineer and academic
- Huseyin Biler (born 2002), English footballer
- Huseyin Kyuchuk (born 1962), Bulgarian linguist and academic

=== Hüseyin ===
- Hüseyin Akbaş (1933–1989), Turkish wrestler
- Hüseyin Cemal Akın (born 1949), Turkish lawyer and politician
- Hüseyin Aktaş (1941–2012), Turkish long-distance runner
- Hüseyin Alkan (born 1988), Turkish Paralympian goalball player
- Hüseyin Alp (1935–1983), Turkish basketball player and actor
- Hüseyin Bahri Alptekin (1957–2007), Turkish artist
- Hüseyin Altıntaş (born 1994), Turkish footballer
- Hüseyin Atalay (born 1991), Turkish footballer
- Hüseyin Atıcı (born 1986), Turkish track and field athlete
- Hüseyin Kenan Aydın (1962–2026), German-Turkish politician
- Hüseyin Aygün (born 1970), Turkish lawyer and politician
- Hüseyin Bağcı (born 1959), Turkish academic and author
- Hüseyin Başaran (1958–2015), Turkish sports commentator
- Hüseyin Baybaşin (born 1956), Turkish drug baron and crime boss
- Hüseyin Beşok (born 1975), Turkish basketball player
- Hüseyin Avni Bey (1875–1915), Ottoman Army officer
- Hüseyin Pasha Boljanić (died 1595), Ottoman politician
- Hüseyin Çakıroğlu (1957–1986), Turkish footballer
- Hüseyin Çapkın (born 1951), Turkish politician
- Hüseyin Çelebi (1967–1992), Turkish writer
- Hüseyin Çelik (born 1959), Turkish politician
- Hüseyincan Celil (born 1969), Chinese-Canadian prisoner
- Hüseyin Cengiz (born 1984), Turkish-Dutch footballer
- Hüseyin Çimşir (born 1979), Turkish football coach and player
- Hüseyin Avni Coş (1959–2021), Turkish politician
- Hüseyin Diriöz (born 1956), Turkish diplomat
- Hüseyin Doğan (born 1994), Dutch footballer
- Hüseyin Doğru (born 1983), German journalist and documentary filmmaker
- Hüseyin Dündar (born 1986), Turkish boxer
- Hüseyin Er (1985–2021), British-Turkish footballer
- Hüseyin Erçetin (1911–1993), Turkish wrestler
- Hüseyin Erdem (born 1949), German-Turkish author and screenwriter
- Hüseyin Erkan (born 1958), Turkish civil servant
- Hüseyin Hüsnü Emir Erkilet (1883–1958), Turkish Army officer
- Hüseyin Erkmen (1915–??), Turkish wrestler
- Hüseyin Eroğlu (born 1972), German-Turkish football manager and player
- Hüseyin Gelis (born 1959), Turkish businessman
- Hüseyin Gezer (1920–2013), Turkish sculptor
- Hüseyin Göçek (born 1976), Turkish football referee
- Hüseyin Kemal Gürmen (1901–1974), Turkish actor
- Hüseyin Rahmi Gürpınar (1864–1944), Turkish writer and politician
- Hüseyin Gürsoy (1934–1993), Turkish wrestler
- Hüseyin Hamamcı (born 1951), Turkish football manager
- Hüseyin Hilmi the Socialist (1885–1922), Turkish politician
- Hüseyin Hilmi Işık (1911–2001), Turkish Islamic scholar
- Hüseyin Kazım Kadri (1870–1934), Turkish politician and writer
- Hüseyin Kala (born 1987), Turkish footballer
- Hüseyin Kalkan (1950–2010), Turkish politician
- Hüseyin Kalpar (born 1955), Turkish football coach and player
- Hüseyin Kandemir (born 1986), Turkish rower
- Hüseyin Kartal (footballer) (born 1982), Turkish footballer
- Hüseyin Kartal (taekwondo) (born 2000), Turkish taekwondo athlete
- Hüseyin Çavuş Kelle (born 1979), Turkish-Cypriot politician
- Hüseyin Kıvrıkoğlu (born 1934), Turkish Army general
- Hüseyin Koç (born 1979), Turkish volleyball player
- Hüseyin Korkmaz (1987–2025), Turkish police officer
- Hüseyin Köroğlu (born 1964), Turkish-Cypriot actor
- Hüseyin Avni Lifij (1886–1927), Turkish painter
- Hüseyin Numan Menemencioğlu (1893–1958), Turkish diplomat and politician
- Hüseyin Avni Mutlu (born 1956), Turkish politician
- Hüseyin Olan (born 1959), Turkish pharmacist and politician
- Hüseyin Oruç, Turkish badminton player
- Hüseyin Özer (born 1949), Turkish-British executive chef and restaurateur
- Hüseyin Özgürgün (born 1965), Turkish-Cypriot politician
- Hüseyin Özkan (born 1972), Turkish judoka
- Hüseyin Öztoprak, Turkish-Cypriot politician
- Hüseyin Öztürk (1928–??), Turkish basketball player
- Hüseyin Pasha (Celali rebel) (died 1600), Ottoman politician and rebel
- Hüseyin Avni Pasha (1820–1876), Ottoman Army officer and politician
- Hüseyin Hilmi Pasha (1855–1922), Ottoman diplomat and politician
- Hüseyin Hüsnü Pasha (born 1852) (1852–1918), Ottoman admiral
- Hüseyin Nâzım Pasha (1854–1927), Turkish politician and journalist
- Hüseyin Tevfik Pasha (1832–1901), Ottoman mathematician, author, and politician
- Hüseyin Zekai Pasha (1860–1919), Turkish painter
- Hüseyin Saygun (1920–1993), Turkish footballer
- Hüseyin Sayram (1905–1988), Turkish politician
- Hüseyin Şehitoğlu (born 1957), Turkish engineer
- Hüseyin Sermet (born 1955), Turkish pianist and composer
- Hüseyin Sungur (1931–2022), Turkish merchant and politician
- Hüseyin Tavur (born 1972), Turkish football manager
- Hüseyin Tok (born 1988), Turkish footballer
- Hüseyin Turgut (1900–1971), Turkish Army officer
- Hüseyin Türkmen (born 1998), Turkish footballer
- Hüseyin Furkan Uslu (born 2002), Turkish footballer
- Hüseyin Velioğlu (1952–2000), Turkish militant
- Hüseyin Cahit Yalçın (1874–1957), Turkish theorist, writer, and politician
- Hüseyin Yıldırım (born 1928), Turkish-American spy
- Hüseyin Yıldız (footballer) (born 1979), Turkish futsal player
- Hüseyin Yıldız (politician, born 1953) (born 1953), Turkish politician
- Hüseyin Yıldız (politician, born 1967) (born 1967), Turkish politician
- Hüseyin Yoğurtçu (born 1983), Turkish football coach and player
- Hüseyin Avni Zaimler (1877–1930), Turkish Army officer and politician

=== Huseyn ===
- Huseyn Aliyev (1911–1991), Azerbaijani painter
- Huseyngulu Aliyev (born 1949), Azerbaijani painter and sculptor
- Huseyn Arablinski (1881–1919), Azerbaijani actor
- Huseynagha Atakishiyev (1949–2006), Azerbaijani actor and theatre director
- Huseyngulu Baghirov (born 1955), Azerbaijani politician
- Huseyn Derya (1975–2014), Azerbaijani rapper and actor
- Huseyn Hagverdiyev (born 1956), Azerbaijani painter, photographer, and sculptor
- Huseynagha Hajibababeyov (1898–1972), Azerbaijani opera singer
- Huseyn Hasanov (athlete) (born 1986), Azerbaijani Paralympian athlete
- Huseyn Hasanov (neurophysiologist) (1932–1995), Azerbaijani neurophysiologist
- Huseyn Javid (1882–1941), Azerbaijani poet and playwright
- Huseyngulu Khan Khoyski (1870–1955), Azerbaijani Army officer
- Huseyn Mahammadov (born 1974), Azerbaijani footballer
- Huseyngulu Mammadov (1875–1921), Georgian politician
- Huseyn Najafov (1907–1967), Azerbaijani politician
- Huseyn Khan Nakhchivanski (1863–1919), Russian-Azerbaijani Army officer
- Huseyn Rahimli (born 1995), Azerbaijani para judoka
- Huseyn Rahmanov (1902–1938), Azerbaijani politician
- Huseyn Razi (1924–1998), Azerbaijani poet and playwright
- Huseynagha Sadigov (born 1940), Azerbaijani politician and diplomat
- Huseynagha Sadigov (actor) (1914–1983), Azerbaijani actor
- Huseyngulu Sarabski (1879–1945), Azerbaijani opera singer, composer, playwright, actor, theatre director, and musician
- Huseyn Seyidzadeh (1910–1979), Azerbaijani film director
- Huseyn Suhrawardy (1892–1963), Pakistani politician and statesman

=== Hüseyn ===
- Hüseyn Kürdoğlu (1934–2003), Azerbaijani poet and literary critic

=== Hussain ===
- Hussain I of the Maldives (died 1408/09), Maldivian sultan
- Hussain Abbas (born 1994), Emirati footballer
- Hussain Abdulrahman (born 1994), Emirati footballer
- Hussain Adam (1968–1988), Maldivian soldier
- Hussain Ahmed (basketball) (born 1989), Emirati basketball player
- Hussain Ahmed (footballer) (1932–2021), Indian footballer
- Hussain Rasheed Ahmed, Maldivian Islamic scholar and politician
- Hussain Ali (born 1976), Maldivian Army officer and singer
- Hussain Almossawi (born 1988), Bahraini designer, artist, and author
- Hussain Arif (born 1968), Pakistani sprinter
- Hussain Asghar, Pakistani police officer
- Hussain Ashkanani (born 2002), Kuwaiti footballer
- Hussain Ayed (born 1989), Emirati-Iraqi footballer
- Hussain Ali Baba (born 1982), Bahraini footballer
- Hussain Al Baharna (1932–2025), Bahraini lawyer, legal advisor, and politician
- Hussain Ali Khan Barha (1666–1720), Mughal subahdar
- Hussain Bhola (born 1996), Zimbabwean cricketer
- Hussain Bisad (born 1975), Somali giant
- Hussain Butt (born 1978), Pakistani cricketer
- Hussain Chandio (born 1974), Pakistani artist
- Hussain Dalal (born 1989), Indian actor and screenwriter
- Hussain Darwish, Syrian poet and journalist
- Hussain Dawood (born 1943), Pakistani businessman and philanthropist
- Hussain Al-Eisa (born 2000), Saudi footballer
- Hussain Muhammad Ershad (1930–2019), Bangladeshi Army officer and politician
- Hussain Fadhel (born 1984), Kuwaiti footballer
- Hussain Faisal (born 1986), Bahraini eulogy reciter, music producer, and composer
- Hussain Fariyaaz (born 1983), Maldivian journalist
- Hussain Rabi Gandhi (1948–2023), Indian writer, cultural activist, and politician
- Hussain Ghuloum (born 1969), Emirati footballer
- Hussain Baksh Gullo (1948–2023), Pakistani vocalist and composer
- Hussain Al-Hadhri (born 1990), Omani footballer
- Hussain Haidry, Indian poet, writer, and lyricist
- Hussain Al-Hajoj (born 1998), Saudi footballer
- Hussain Hakem (born 1984), Kuwaiti footballer
- Hussain Haleem (born 1969), Maldivian long-distance runner
- Hussain Al-Hamdah (born 1983), Saudi long-distance runner
- Hussain El-Din Hamed (born 1963), Egyptian wrestler
- Hussain Al Hammadi (born 1966), Emirati politician and diplomat
- Hussain Al-Hannabi (born 1988), Saudi handball player
- Hussain Ul Haque (1949–2021), Indian writer, critic, and theorist
- Hussain Ali Abbass Harba (born 1961), Iraqi architect and designer
- Hussain Mohamed Hassan (field hockey) (born 1971), Egyptian field hockey player
- Hussain Mohamed Hassan (judoka) (born 1970), Kuwaiti judoka
- Hussain Rasheed Hassan, Maldivian politician
- Hussain Hindawi (born 1947), Iraqi author, poet, journalist, and editor
- Hussain Al-Hizam (born 1998), Saudi athlete
- Hussain Hotak (died 1738), Afghan emir
- Hussain Bakhsh Jarra (1918–1990), Pakistani Shiite scholar
- Hussain Jasim (born 1966), Iraqi athlete
- Hussain Al Jassmi (born 1979), Emirati singer and musician
- Hussain Jawad (born 1987), Bahraini human rights activist
- Hussain Jiffry, Sri Lankan-American bassist
- Hussain Ahmad Kanjo (1985–2020), Pakistani politician
- Hussain Kankouni (born 2005), Kuwaiti footballer
- Hussain Karimi (born 1983), Bahraini racing driver
- Hussain Bakhsh Khadim (1930–1992), Pakistani folk singer and poet
- Hussain Khan (born 1944), Indian equestrian
- Hussain Khan (captain) (1895–1947), Pakistani Army officer
- Hussain Aga Khan (born 1974), Swiss photographer
- Hussain Al-Khodari (born 1972), Kuwait footballer
- Hussain Killer, Pakistani footballer
- Hussain Ajij Kurbu (born 1990), Indian cyclist
- Hussain Kuwajerwala (born 1977), Indian actor, host, and model
- Hussain Mohamed Latheef, Maldivian politician
- Hussain Lawai (born 1945), Pakistani banker
- Hussain Madavoor (born 1956), Indian Islamic scholar, educationalist, and social activist
- Hussain Mahmoudi (born 1962), Iranian cyclist
- Hussain Niyaz Mohamed (born 1987), Maldivian footballer
- Hussain Montassir (1923–1992), Egyptian basketball player
- Hussain Muaaz (born 1985), Saudi footballer
- Hussain Munawwar (born 1988), Maldivian film director, cinematographer, producer, and actor
- Hussain Al-Musawi (born 1988), Kuwaiti footballer
- Hussain Mustahil (born 1980), Omani footballer
- Hussain Al Mutawaa (born 1989), Kuwaiti writer, poet, literary critic, and photographer
- Hussain Najadi (1938–2013), Bahraini-Malaysian banker
- Hussain Al-Nakhli (born 1995), Saudi footballer
- Hussain Al-Nattar (born 2000), Saudi footballer
- Hussain Nihan (born 1992), Maldivian footballer
- Hussain Nooradeen (born 1969), Maldivian film producer and actor
- Hussain Al-Nowaiqi (born 1995), Saudi footballer
- Hussain Al Nowais (born 1956), Emirati businessman
- Hussain Al-Qahtani (born 1994), Saudi footballer
- Hussain al-Qallaf (born 1958), Kuwaiti politician
- Hussain Qassem (born 1997), Saudi footballer
- Hussain Al Quraish (born 1997), Saudi footballer
- Hussain Rahal (born 1988), Syrian footballer
- Hussain Abdul Rahman (1942–2015), Maldivian lawyer and judge
- Hussain Muhammad Masihur Rahman, Bangladeshi Army officer
- Hussain Al-Romaihi (born 1974), Qatari footballer
- Hussain Sadiqi (born 1981), Afghan-Australian actor and martial artist
- Hussain Said (born 1977), Egyptian handball player
- Hussain Sajwani (born 1953), Emirati property developer
- Hussain Salahuddin (1881–1948), Maldivian writer, poet, essayist, and scholar
- Hussain Salman (born 1982), Bahraini footballer
- Hussain Seraj (born 1982), Kuwaiti footballer
- Hussain Shae'an (born 1989), Saudi footballer
- Hussain Shah (born 1964), Pakistani boxer
- Hussain Nizam Shah I (1540–1565), Indian sultan
- Hussain al-Shahristani (born 1942), Iraqi politician
- Hussain Shameem, Maldivian lawyer
- Hussain Shareef (born 1998), Maldivian footballer
- Hussain Shareef (judoka), Kuwaiti judoka
- Hussain Sharif (born 1961), Emirati artist
- Hussain Shehab (born 1985), Iraqi-Qatari footballer
- Hussain Hassan Shehu (born 1978), Nigerian politician
- Hussain Al-Sheikh (born 1990), Saudi footballer
- Hussain Al-Sibyani (born 2001), Saudi footballer
- Hussain Sifaau (born 1996), Maldivian footballer
- Hussain Sobah (born 1972), Maldivian film actor, composer, and playback singer
- Hussain Talat (born 1996), Pakistani cricketer
- Hussain Al-Turki (born 1982), Saudi footballer
- Hussain Umarji (died 2013), Indian Islamic scholar and philanthropist
- Hussain Shah Wali (died 1620), Indian Sufi scholar
- Hussain Yee (born 1954), Malaysian Islamic scholar
- Hussain Ali Yousafi (1958–2009), Pakistani politician
- Hussain Mohammad Yusof (1933–2012), Bruneian aristocrat and politician
- Hussain Zawar (1916–1980), Indian politician

=== Hussaini ===
- Hussaini Akwanga (1944–2021), Nigerian politician
- Hussaini Muhammad Jallo, Nigerian politician
- Hussaini Ishaq Magaji (born 1982), Nigerian lawyer and politician

=== Hussayn ===
- Hussayn Touati (born 2001), French footballer

=== Hussein ===
- Hussein of Jordan (1935–1999), Jordanian king
- Hussein, Crown Prince of Jordan (born 1994), Crown Prince of Jordan
- Hussein, King of Hejaz (1853–1931), Sharif and Emir of Mecca
- Hussein Abayat (died 2000), Palestinian militant
- Hussein Abbass (born 1969), Egyptian researcher and academic
- Hussein Abdel-Latif (born 1965), Egyptian football player and manager
- Hussein Abdelbagi (born 1971), South Sudanese politician
- Hussein Sheikh Abdirahman (1941–2016), Somali judge and politician
- Hussein Abdul-Raof, Saudi Quranic scholar and linguist
- Hussein Abdulghani (born 1977), Saudi footballer
- Hussein al Abri (born 1972), Omani writer and psychiatrist
- Hussein Ali Abdulle (died 2017), Somali football coach and player
- Hussein Abebe (born 1964), Tanzanian businessman
- Hussein Mohamed Adam (1943–2017), Somali professor
- Hussein Kulmiye Afrah (1920–1993), Somali police officer, revolutionary, and politician
- Hussein Ahmed Aideed, Somali politician
- Hussein Farrah Aidid (born 1962), Somali politician
- Hussein Akil (born 1990), Lebanese-Australian footballer
- Hussein AlAnkoshei (born 1987), Iraqi politician, sports personality, businessman, and lawyer
- Hussein El-Alfy (1927–2011), Egyptian rower
- Hussein Ali (footballer, born 1982) (born 1982), Egyptian footballer
- Hussein Ali (footballer, born 2002) (born 2002), Swedish-Iraqi footballer
- Hussein Ali (judoka) (born 1990), Iraqi judoka
- Hussein al-Ali (born 1999), Syrian politician and rebel
- Hussein Aljunied (1943–2016), Singaporean football player and manager
- Hussein Amar (born 1958), Tanzanian politician
- Hussein Amer (born 2002), Iraqi footballer
- Hussein Sirri Amer, Egyptian Army officer
- Hussein Amine (born 1985), Lebanese footballer
- Hussein Ammouta (born 1969), Moroccan football manager and player
- Hussein Bin Abdallah Al Amri (born 1944), Yemeni diplomat and writer
- Hussein Aoudat (1937–2016), Syrian writer and journalist
- Hussein Arab (born 1947), Yemeni politician
- Hussein al-Araj, Palestinian politician
- Hussein Arnous (born 1953), Syrian politician
- Hussein Assaf (born 1976), Syrian politician
- Hussein Awada (footballer, born 1990) (born 1990), Lebanese footballer
- Hussein Awada (footballer, born 2000) (born 2000), Lebanese footballer
- Hussein al-Awadhi (born 1957), Yemeni politician and journalist
- Hussein Al-Awadi (born 1944), Iraqi politician
- Hussein Azzam (born 1973), Palestinian Guantanamo detainee
- Hussein Kamel Bahaeddin (1932–2016), Egyptian academic and politician
- Hussein Barghouthi (1954–2002), Palestinian poet, writer, essayist, critic, lyricist, playwright, and philosopher
- Hussein Barsham, Sudanese Army officer
- Hussein Bashe (born 1975), Tanzanian politician
- Hussein Bassir, Egyptian archaeologist
- Hussein Bayram (born 1975), French boxer
- Hussein Bazzi (1987/88–2026), Lebanese academic
- Hussein Ahamed Bhaila (born 1949), Sri Lankan politician
- Hussein Bicar (1913–2002), Egyptian artist
- Hussein Al-Bishi (born 1961), Saudi footballer
- Hussein Hagi Bood (died 2008), Somali politician
- Hussein Bourgi (born 1973), French politician
- Hussein Carneil (born 2003), Swedish-Afghan footballer
- Hussein Chalayan (born 1970), Turkish-Cypriot fashion designer
- Hussein Daher (born 1977), Lebanese footballer
- Hussein Dakik (born 1988), Lebanese footballer
- Hussein Darbouk (died 2011), Libyan Army officer
- Hussein Dey (1764/65–1838), Algerian Dey
- Hussein Khodja Dey (died 1707), Algerian Dey
- Hussein Dokmak (1981–2007), Lebanese footballer
- Hussein El Dor (born 1994), Lebanese footballer
- Hussein Ali Duale, Somali diplomat and politician
- Hussein Abdi Dualeh, Somali politician and engineer
- Hussein Eid (born 1946), Egyptian writer
- Hussein Ezeddine (born 2002), Lebanese footballer
- Hussein Fahmi (footballer) (born 1984), Egyptian footballer
- Hussein Fahmy (born 1940), Egyptian actor
- Hussein Faisal (born 1999), Egyptian footballer
- Hussein Falah (born 1994), Iraqi footballer
- Hussein Farey, Somali politician
- Hussein Faris (1935–2021), Israeli-Arab politician
- Hussein Fatal (1973–2015), American rap artist
- Hussein Fazal, Canadian-American entrepreneur
- Hussein Mahmoud Ferzat (born 1957), Syrian politician
- Hussein Bakry Gazzaz (1925–2021), Saudi businessman
- Hussein El Gebaly (1934–2014), Egyptian artist
- Hussein Al-Ghazi (born 1990), Yemeni footballer
- Hussein Hafiz (born 1985), Egyptian judoka
- Hussein Abdi Halane, Somali economist and politician
- Hussein Halawani (born 1996), Saudi footballer
- Hussein Hamdan (born 1978), Lebanese footballer
- Hussein Hamdy (born 1985), Egyptian footballer
- Hussein Abdo Hamza (1949–2022), Egyptian counselor
- Hussein Harmoush (1972–2012), Syrian Army officer
- Hussein Hasan, Somali poet and warrior
- Hussein Hashim (born 1933), Iraqi footballer
- Hussein Hassan (born 2003), Iraqi footballer
- Hussein Hajj Hassan (born 1960), Lebanese politician
- Hussein Hawsawi (born 1998), Saudi footballer
- Hussein Hegazi (1889–1961), Egyptian footballer
- Hussein Pasha Hosni (1896–1985), Egyptian assistant
- Hussein al-Houthi (1959–2004), Yemeni politician and religious leader
- Hussein Nasser Al-Huraiti (born 1962), Kuwaiti politician
- Hussein al-Husayni (died 1918), Palestinian politician
- Hussein Hussein (born 1975), Australian boxer
- Hussein Alaa Hussein (born 1987), Iraqi footballer
- Hussein Mohamud Sheikh Hussein, Somali politician
- Hussein el-Husseini (1937–2023), Lebanese politician
- Hussein El Husseiny (born 1991), Egyptian footballer
- Hussein Ibish (born 1963), Lebanese-American academic
- Hussein Ibrahim (born 1993), Lebanese footballer
- Hussein Al Idrissy (born 1985), Libyan footballer
- Hussein el-Imam (1951–2014), Egyptian composer, actor, and producer
- Hussein Isaac (1954–2014), Syrian Army officer
- Hussein Adan Isack (born 1957), Kenyan naturalist, ethnobiologist, and ornithology research scientist
- Hussein Ishaish (born 1995), Jordanian boxer
- Hussein Ismail, Ethiopian politician and diplomat
- Hussein Issa (1947–2000), Palestinian activist
- Hussein Arab Isse, Somali politician
- Hussein Jabbar (born 1998), Iraqi footballer
- Hussein Jaber, Iraqi footballer
- Hussein Jabur (born 1933), Iraqi footballer
- Hussein Javu (born 1991), Tanzanian footballer
- Hussein Jelaad (born 1970), Jordanian writer
- Hussein Al Jerif (born 1998), Sudanese footballer
- Hussein Mohamed Jiciir, Somali politician
- Hussein Jwayed (born 1993), Syrian footballer
- Hussein Sheikh Ahmed Kaddare (1934–2015), Somali inventor, linguist, and researcher
- Hussein Kamal (1932–2003), Egyptian television, film, and theatre director
- Hussein Kamel of Egypt (1853–1917), Egyptian sultan
- Hussein Abu al-Khair (1965–2023), Jordanian alleged drug smuggler
- Hussein Khairan (born 1953), Yemeni Army officer and politician
- Hussein Abdul-Wahid Khalaf (born 1993), Iraqi footballer
- Hussein Khalidi (1895–1962), Palestinian politician and physician
- Hussein al-Khalil (born 1955), Lebanese politician
- Hussein Khaliqi, Iranian writer
- Hussein Khodja (1780–1857), Tunisian politician
- Hussein Khomeini (born 1958/59), Iranian scholar and cleric
- Hussein Kyanjo (1960–2023), Ugandan politician, youth leader, and human rights advocate
- Hussein Labib (born 1955), Egyptian businessman and handball player
- Hussein Luaibi (born 1953), Iraqi football coach and player
- Hussein M'Barki (born 1955), Moroccan rugby union and rugby league footballer
- Hussein Mabrouk (born 1980), Egyptian handball player
- Hussein Adel Madani (died 2019), Iraqi cartoonist and political activist
- Hussein Madi (1938–2024), Lebanese painter, sculptor, and printmaker
- Hussein Madkour (1919–2001), Egyptian footballer
- Hussein Ali Mahfoudh (1926–2009), Iraqi scholar and author
- Hussein Majali (born 1960), Jordanian Army officer, diplomat, and politician
- Hussein Kamel al-Majid (1954–1996), Iraqi Army officer
- Hussein Makhlouf (born 1964), Syrian politician
- Hussein Al-Taib Maki (born 1941), Saudi athlete
- Hussein al-Masri, Syrian politician
- Hussein Maziq (1918–2006), Libyan politician
- Hussein Mjalli (1937–2014), Jordanian politician and lawyer
- Hussein Mohamed (born 1997), Somali footballer
- Hussein Maalim Mohamed, Kenyan politician
- Hussein Mohammed, Ugandan Army officer
- Hussein Mohamed Mohamoud, Somali politician
- Hussein Moheb (born 1985), Yemeni singer
- Hussein Monsalve (born 1969), Venezuelan cyclist
- Hussein-Ali Montazeri (1922–2009), Iranian cleric, politician, theologian, writer, and activist
- Hussein Monzer (born 1997), Lebanese footballer
- Hussein T. Mouftah (born 1947), Canadian computer scientist and electrical engineer
- Hussein Moukhtar (1905–1966), Egyptian weightlifter
- Hussein Moussawi (born 1943), Lebanese politician
- Hussein Sabry Gad El Mula, Egyptian scout
- Hussein al-Musawi (died 1990), Lebanese militant
- Hussein Sadiq al Musrati, Libyan diplomat
- Hussein Quwaian Al-Mutairi (born 1968), Kuwaiti politician
- Hussein Mwinyi (born 1966), Tanzanian politician
- Hussein Mzee (born 1964), Tanzanian politician
- Hussein Naeem (1987–2007), Lebanese footballer
- Hussein Nahaba (born 1966), Iraqi translator, writer, and poet
- Hussein Naim, Lebanese-Swiss biochemist and molecular virologist
- Hussein ibn Nasser (1902–1982), Jordanian prince, diplomat, and politician
- Hussein Kuli Khan Nawab (1864–1946), Iranian politician and diplomat
- Hussein Nurmatov (born 2000), Tajik footballer
- Hussein Onn (1922–1990), Malaysian lawyer and politician
- Hussein Al Oweini (1900–1971), Lebanese businessman and politician
- Hussein Fakhry Pasha (1843–1920), Egyptian politician
- Hussein Refki Pasha (1876–1950), Egyptian Army general and politician
- Hussein Roshdy Pasha (1863–1928), Egyptian politician
- Hussein Sabri Pasha, Egyptian politician
- Hussein Sirri Pasha (1894–1960), Egyptian politician
- Hussein Al-Qatrani, Libyan politician
- Hussein Al-Qattan (1926–2025), Kuwaiti actor
- Hussein Radjabu, Burundian politician
- Hussein Ragab (born 1993), Egyptian footballer
- Hussein Rashid (born 1940), Iraqi Army officer
- Hussein Abdul Rasoul (1910–1997), Egyptian archaeologist
- Hussein Riad (1897–1965), Egyptian actor
- Hussein F. Sabbour (1936–2021), Egyptian civil engineer and architect
- Hussein Al-Sabee (born 1979), Saudi long jumper
- Hussein Saddik (born 1939), Egyptian boxer
- Hussein Al-Sadiq (born 1973), Saudi footballer
- Hussein Al-Sadiq (swimmer) (born 1971), Saudi swimmer
- Hussein Mohammed Hadi Al-Sadr (1945–2026), Iraqi Shiite cleric, scholar, and writer
- Hussein Ali Al-Saedi (born 1996), Iraqi footballer
- Hussein Saeed (born 1958), Iraqi footballer
- Hussein Ahmed Salah (born 1956), Djiboutian long-distance runner
- Hussein al-Salama (born 1984), Syrian intelligence officer and militant
- Hussein Suleiman Abu Saleh (1930–2021), Sudanese politician and neurosurgeon
- Hussein Salem (1933–2019), Egyptian businessman
- Hussein Samatar (1964–2013), Somali-American politician, banker, and community organizer
- Hussein El-Sayed (born 1964), Egyptian footballer
- Hussein El Sayed (born 1991), Egyptian footballer
- Hussein Ali al-Shaalan (died 2018), Iraqi politician
- Hussein Shabani (born 1990), Burundian footballer
- Hussein el-Shafei (1918–2005), Egyptian Army officer and politician
- Hussein Shah of Johor (1776–1835), Malaysian sultan
- Hussein El Shahat (born 1992), Egyptian footballer
- Hussein al-Sharaa (born 1946), Syrian economist, researcher, and writer
- Hussein Sharafeddine (born 1997), Lebanese footballer
- Hussein Shariffe (1934–2005), Sudanese filmmaker, painter, poet, and university lecturer
- Hussein al-Sheikh (born 1960), Palestinian politician
- Hussein Mohamed Sheikh, Somali politician
- Hussein Sherif, Egyptian taekwondo practitioner
- Hussein Shido (1926–??), Somali politician
- Hussein al-Shirazi (born 1970), Iraqi Shiite cleric
- Hussein Shire (1928/29–2014), Somali entrepreneur
- Hussein Al-Shuwaish (born 1989), Saudi footballer
- Hussein Skenderovic (born 1972), Australian football manager
- Hussein Muyonjo Swengere, Ugandan politician, comedian, and radio personality
- Hussein al-Taee (born 1983), Finnish politician
- Hussein Tahan (born 1982), Lebanese football coach and player
- Hussein al-Tahan (born 1955), Iraqi politician
- Hussein Tawbe (born 1982), Lebanese basketball player
- Hussein Ali Thajil (born 1958), Iraqi footballer
- Hussein Al Uzri, Iranian politician
- Hussein El-Wad (1948–2018), Tunisian academic, poet, critic, and novelist
- Hussein Abdul-Wahid Waham (born 1985), Iraqi footballer
- Hussein Ali Wahid (born 1992), Iraqi footballer
- Hussein Nasser Walji (1920–2005), Tanzanian-Canadian community leader
- Hussein Yasser (born 1984), Egyptian-Qatari footballer
- Hussein Yassin (born 1943), Palestinian writer
- Hussein Yazdanpanah (born 1966), Iranian military leader
- Hussein al-Yemeni, Yemeni Al-Qaeda member
- Hussein Zaky (born 1979), Egyptian handball player and coach
- Hussein al-Zawahiri, Egyptian terror suspect
- Hussein M. Zbib (1958–2020), Lebanese-American engineer
- Hussein Zedan (1953–2019), Egyptian computer scientist
- Hussein Zein (born 1995), Lebanese footballer
- Hussein Al-Zuhairi (died 2020), Iraqi politician

=== Husseini ===
- Husseini Heravi (1245–1318), Afghan poet and author

=== Husseyn ===
- Husseyn Chakroun (born 2004), Lebanese-German footballer
- Husseyn Langah (died 1502), Sultan of Multan

=== Hussien ===
- Hussien El Achkar (born 2007), Australian rules footballer

=== Hussin ===
- Hussin Ututalum Amin (born 1951), Filipino politician and scholar
- Hussin Ismail (born 1953), Malaysian police officer

=== Usain ===
- Usain Bolt (born 1986), Jamaican sprinter

== Surname ==
=== Hosein ===
- Akeal Hosein (born 1993), Trinidadian cricketer
- Harvey Hosein (born 1996), English cricketer
- Imran N. Hosein (born 1942), Trinidadian Islamic preacher, author, and philosopher
- Kazim Hosein, Trinidadian politician
- Kevin Jared Hosein (born 1986), Trinidadian writer
- Saddam Hosein, Trinidadian politician

=== Hossain ===
- Abdul Mannan Hossain (1952–2017), Indian politician
- Akbar Hossain (politician) (1941–2006), Bangladeshi politician
- Anwar Hossain (disambiguation), multiple people
- Ashraf Hossain (died 2020), Bangladeshi politician
- Faisal Hossain (born 1978), Bangladeshi cricketer
- Hasibul Hossain (born 1977), Bangladeshi cricketer
- Kamal Hossain (born 1937), Bangladeshi politician
- M Makbul Hossain (born 1961), Bangladesh Navy officer
- Makbul Hossain (Chuadanga politician), Bangladeshi politician
- Md. Mokbul Hossain (Meherpur politician) (born 1954), Bangladeshi politician
- Md. Mokbul Hossain (Pabna-3 politician) (born 1950), Bangladeshi politician
- Mehrab Hossain (disambiguation), multiple people
- Mir Mosharraf Hossain (1847–1911), Bengali writer
- Moazzem Hossain (disambiguation), multiple people
- Mockbul Hossain (1950–2020), Bangladeshi businessman
- Mohammad Hossain, Indian politician
- Mohammed Mosharref Hossain, Bangladeshi criminal
- Mohammad Nazmul Hossain (born 1987), Bangladeshi cricketer
- Mokbul Hossain (Pabna-2 politician) (1943–2021), Bangladeshi politician
- Nina Hossain, British journalist and presenter
- Noor Hossain (disambiguation), multiple people
- Sanwar Hossain (born 1973), Bangladeshi cricketer
- Selina Hossain (born 1947), Bengali writer
- Shahadat Hossain (born 1986), Bangladeshi cricketer
- Shahriar Hossain (born 1975), Bangladeshi cricketer
- Zakir Hossain (disambiguation), several people

=== Hossein ===
- Farah Hussein (born 2001), Egyptian gymnast
- Mainul Hosein (1940–2023), Bangladeshi lawyer
- Mehnaz Hoosein (born 1973), Indian singer
- Robert Hossein (1927–2020), French actor, director, and writer

=== Houssein ===
- Nimo Boulhan Houssein, Djiboutian politician

=== Husain ===
- Adrian A. Husain, Pakistani poet, Shakespearean scholar, and literary journalist
- Akhter Husain (1902–1983), Pakistani politician
- Altaf Husain (1900–1968), Pakistani journalist
- Amir Husain (born 1977), Pakistani-American entrepreneur, inventor, and author
- Anoushé Husain (born 1987/88), British paraclimber and civil servant
- Attia Hosain (1913–1998), British-Indian journalist and author
- Claudio Husaín (born 1974), Argentinian footballer
- Ishrat Husain (born 1941), Pakistani politician
- Irfan Husain (1944–2020), Pakistani journalist
- M. F. Husain (1915–2011), Indian artist
- Mishal Husain (born 1973), British journalist, broadcaster, and author
- Nuzhat Husain, Indian pathologist
- Shahrukh Husain (born 1950), Pakistani author
- Yusof Husain (1906–1975), Bruneian aristocrat and civil servant
- Zakir Husain (1897–1969), Indian politician
- Zakir Husain (governor) (1897–1971), Pakistani politician
- Zakir Hussain (musician) (1951–2024), Indian tabla player, composer, arranger, percussionist, music producer, and film actor

=== Hüseyin ===
- Metin Hüseyin (born 1959), British film director

=== Huseyn ===
- Mehdi Huseyn (1909–1965), Soviet-Azerbaijani writer and critic

=== Hussain ===
- Abrar Hussain (boxer) (1961–2011), Pakistani boxer
- Abrar Hussain (general) (1918–1992), Pakistani Army officer
- Adil Hussain (born 1963), Indian actor
- Ijaz Hussain (born 1942), Pakistani cricketer
- Iqbalunnisa Hussain (1897–1954), Indian educator, academic, writer, activist, and feminist
- Kholoud Hussain (born 1996), Qatari table tennis player
- Nasser Hussain (born 1968), British cricketer
- Rashad Hussain (born 1979), American attorney, diplomat, and politician
- Rifaat Hussain (1952–2025), Pakistani political scientist, professor, and defense analyst
- Rizwan Hussain (born 1973), British-Bangladeshi television presenter, barrister, and humanitarian worker
- Roquia Sakhawat Hussain (1880–1932), Bangladeshi feminist and social worker
- Sairish Hussain (born 1992), British writer and lecturer
- Shabir Hussain (1968–2024), British chef and restaurateur
- Syed Abdulla Hussain (1944–2009), Indian ornithologist
- Zakir Hussain (disambiguation), multiple people

=== Hussein ===
- Abdul Razak Hussein (1922–1976), Malaysian politician
- Adnan Hussein (born 1954), Lebanese politician
- Prince Ali bin Hussein (born 1975), Jordanian royal
- Ali bin Hussein, King of Hejaz (1879–1935), King of Hejaz and Grand Sharif of Mecca
- Ameena Hussein (born 1964), Sri Lankan writer, editor, and sociologist
- Fouad Hussein, Jordanian journalist
- Mahmoud Hussein (born 1966), Egyptian journalist
- Mohd Faizol Hussien (born 1986), Malaysian footballer
- Princess Muna al-Hussein (born 1941), Jordanian royal consort
- Nedal Hussein (born 1977), Australian boxer
- Qusay Hussein (1966–2003), Iraqi Army officer and politician
- Raghad Hussein (born 1968), Iraqi politician
- Rana Hussein (born 1969), Iraqi child of Saddam Hussein
- Saddam Hussein, Iraqi politician
- Sadqa Hussein (1876–1961), Iraqi-Israeli rabbi, mohel, and spiritual leader
- Sharif Ali bin al-Hussein (1956–2022), Iraqi politician and royal claimant
- Shelomo Bekhor Hussein (1843–1892), Ottoman rabbi, author, and publisher
- Taha Hussein (1889–1973), Egyptian writer and literary scholar
- Uday Hussein (1964–2003), Iraqi politician, military leader, and businessman
- Youssef Hussein (born 1988), Egyptian comedian

== See also ==
- Abdul Hussein, Arabic theophoric name
- Al Hussein (missile), an Iraqi ballistic missile
