= Hossein Atashparvar =

Iranian writer and literary critic

Hossein Atashparvar حسین آتش‌پرور
- حسین آتش پرور
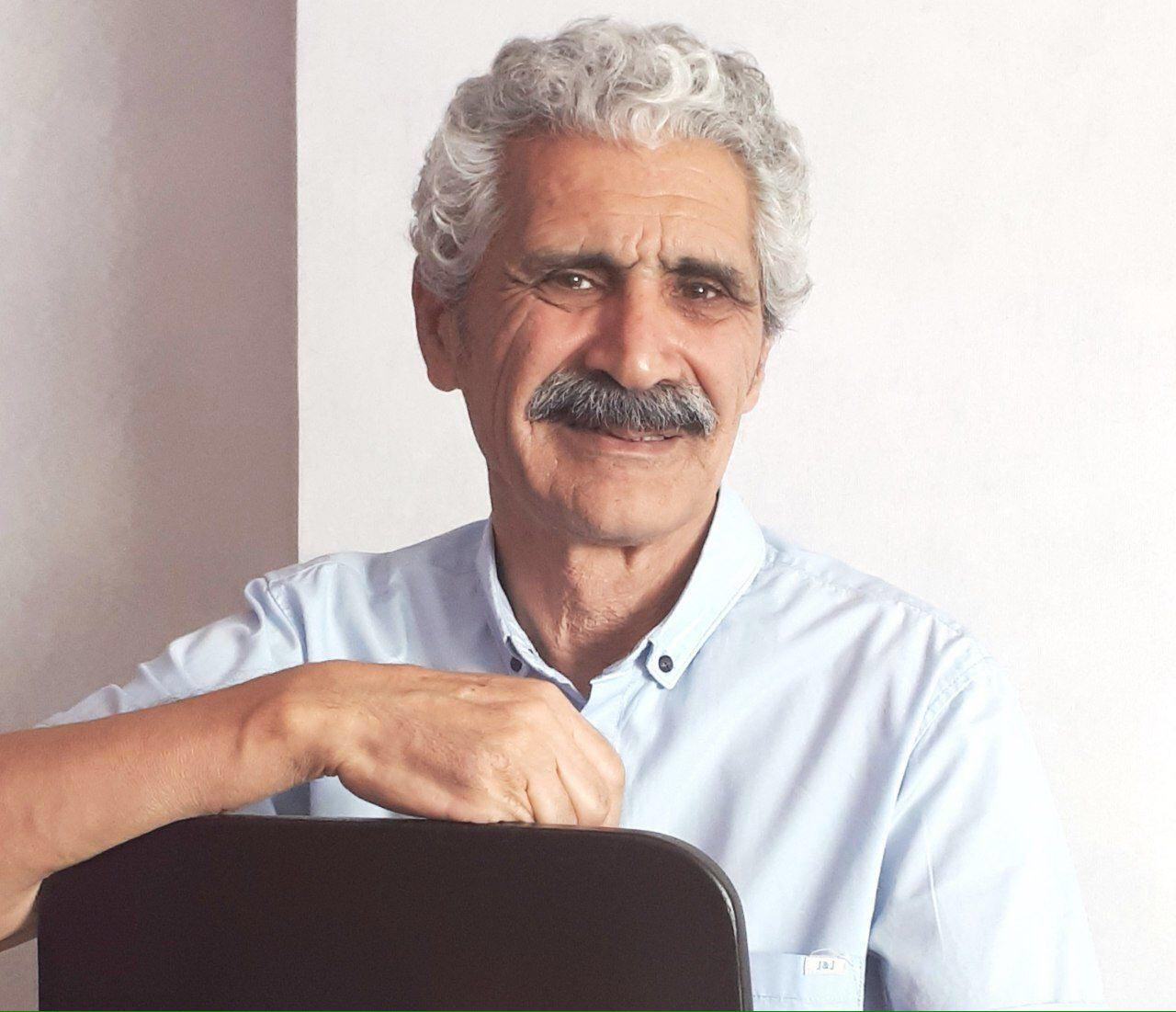
- Born: November 11, 1952 (age 73); Gonabad, Imperial State of Iran
- Occupations: Writer, Literary critic, Literary Juror, Magazine Editor
- Writing career
- Period: 1970s–present
- Genre: Literary fiction
- Website: atashparvar.blogfa.com

Hossein Atashparvar (Persian: حسین آتش‌پرور, born on ,11 November 1952 Disfan, Gonabad, Khorasan Province), is an Iranian writer and a literary critic. He belongs to the Third Generation of Iranian writers. He is the editor of the international literary magazine Neveshta.

He was one of the speakers at the Commemoration of Omar Khayyam, held on 18 May 2014. His research on Omar Khayyam suggests that Khayyam as mathematician, employed the least vocabularies and simplest words to express his thoughts in his work. Therefore, his work resembles the short story style of our time. He is one of the jurors at the Mehregan Adab.[ مهرگان ادب]

By creative employment of Gonabad's folklore such as dialect, culture, traditions, ceremonies, and myths in his short story collections "Mahi dar bad" (Fish in the wind) and "Anduh" (Sorrow), as well as in his novel "Khiyaban-e Bahar abi bud" (Bahar avenue was blue), Atashparvar presents a portrait of the people living in this region to the Iranian literature. To honour Atashparvar's contribution and to employ his expertise, the Gonabad's literature association has been renamed to "Hossein Atashparvar's House of fiction".

Atashparvar started to write before 1970s. His first short stories were published in 1972 by Khorasan Newspaper. The first book which presented his work among other authors such as Mahmoud Dowlatabadi and Asghar Abdollahi, was a short story collection called "Dariche tazeh" published in 1983. In 2011 "Mahi dar bad" (Fish in the wind) which is his last published short story collection earned him the Simin Daneshvar golden plate award In 2015, he published "Khaneh sewom-e dastan" which explores the structure and form in the selected short stories written by the third generation of Iranian writers The setting of his last published Fiction called Mah ta Chah is Mashhad and the book received very good reviews In 2022, Atashparvar was honered in a Ceremony hosted by Ali Dehbashi for his achievements in literature. Reza Abed and Mohammad Ghasemzadeh were among the guests who talked about his books.

== From the Moon to the Well ==
A Novel by Hossein Atashparvar, Translated From The Persian By M.R.Ghanoonparvar

== Works ==
- 1990, "Khabgard and other stories" (with works of other writers such as Houshang Golshiri, Ghazi Rabihavi)
- 1993, short story collection "Anduh" (sarrow)
- 2005, "Khiyaban-e Bahar abi bud"
- 2009, "Kuzeh-ha dar jost-o-juyeh Kuzeh-gar" (on Khayyam)
- 2010, short story collection "Mahi dar bad" (Fish in the wind)
- 2015, "Khaneh sewom-e Dastan"
- 2019, Chahardah Salegi bar barf, Joghd Publication
- 2020 Mah ta Chah, Mehri Publication
