= Houssin =

Houssin is a surname of North African or French origin depending on the ethnicity. From the triconsonantal root H-S-N is Arabic associated to the word Hassan, meaning “good”, “handsome” or “beautiful”.

== List of people with the surname ==
- Édouard Houssin (1847–1919), French sculptor
- Jacques Houssin (1902–1979), French film director and screenwriter
- Joël Houssin (born 1953), French author
- Timothée Houssin (born 1988), French politician

== See also ==
- Hussein
