= Hossein Baziari =

Iranian Football Defender

Personal information
- Full name: Hossein Baziari
- Date of birth: June 21, 1994 (age 32)
- Place of birth: Bushehr, Iran
- Position: Defender

Team information
- Current team: Esteghlal Khuzestan

Senior career*
Years	Team	Apps	(Gls)
2015–2016	Iranjavan	19	(0)
2016–	Esteghlal Khuzestan	1	(0)
- * Club domestic league appearances and goals as of 23 October 2016

Hossein Bazaiari is an Iranian football defender who plays for Esteghlal Khuzestan in the Persian Gulf Pro League.
