= Iqbalunnisa Hussain =

Indian educator and feminist (1897–1954)

- Born: 21 January 1897; Chikkaballapur, Bangalore, Karnataka
- Died: 22 October 1954 (aged 57)
- Occupation(s): Activist, Writer

Academic background
- Education: University of Leeds

Academic work
- Discipline: Sociologist
- Sub-discipline: Feminism

Iqbalunnisa Hussain (21 January 1897 – 22 October 1954) was an Indian educator, writer, activist and feminist who worked for the educational reform in Muslim women.

== Early life and education ==
Iqbalunnisa Hussain was born on 21 January 1897 at Chikkaballapur, Bangalore, Karnataka into the family of Gulam Moinuddin Khan and Zaibunnisa, a descendant of Tipu Sultan. They belonged to a family who followed Sunni Islam.

Hussain was fluent in Urdu, Arabic, English and Persian. She completed her Bachelor of Arts degree with a Gold Medal from Maharani College, Mysore, then studied at the University of Leeds for her post graduate degree of Master of the Arts.

== Career ==
Hussain's book Purdah and Polygamy (1944) was the first novel in English written by a Muslim woman. In the episodic novel, which follows three generations of an upper-class Muslim family, the practice of purdah (the seclusion of women) and zenana are represented with restrained irony, as Hussain "did not feel that purdah had any sanction in the tenets of the Prophet." The book also depicts polygamous marriages. Hussain additionally wrote essays about the social status of women in India.

Hussain also worked as an assistant teacher at Vani Vilas High School in Bangalore.

== Literary works ==
- Hussain, Iqbalunnisa (1940). Changing India: A Muslim Woman Speaks. Hosali Press.
- Hussain, Iqbalunnisa (2018). Purdah and Polygamy: Life in the Indian Muslim Household. Sahitya Akademi. ISBN 978-93-86771-86-5.

== Personal life ==
Hussain was married to Syed Ahmed Hussain, a government official at Mysore in 1914, aged 15. They had seven children together.
