= Husein Jašarević =

Bosnian-Herzegovinian footballer

Husein "Tutek" Jašarević (1914–1979) was among the first players of FK Borac from Banja Luka, Bosnia and Herzegovina, former Yugoslavia.

== Club career ==
He played for the FK Borac before the Second World War, and a couple seasons after 1945. He finished his career in 1947. His position was defensive midfielder.
