= Hussain Hindawi =

- Born: Hussain Yacob Aziz Hindawi; July 1, 1947 (age 78); Al-Hindiya, Iraq
- Known for: First Chairman of Iraq's Independent Electoral Commission (IHEC), Senior Presidential Advisor

Hussain Hindawi is an author, poet, editor, former UN Senior political Advisor in Iraq and editor in chief of the Arabic Services of the United Press International (UPI). He is best known for being the first chairman of Iraq's Independent High Electoral Commission (IHEC), organizing the first elections in Iraq since the fall of Saddam Hussein's regime.

== Early life ==
Born and raised in the Babylonian province Al-Hindiya, Hindawi moved to Baghdad in the 60s, where he studied at the University of Baghdad.

As a rising journalist, Hindawi often published articles citing of his dislike of and objection to Saddam Hussein's methods of ruling, leading Saddam Hussein's thought police to try to torture him into writing in support of the Baathist regime. After suffering numerous injuries during a protest at the Freedom Square in Baghdad, Hindawi fled to Syria via Iraqi Kurdistan by foot, and from there obtained a Visa to France. There, Hindawi spent decades in exile in France where he also resumed his education while living in Paris and Poitiers. He graduated from the University of Poitiers with a certificate in French, a DEA and a PhD in Philosophy.

== Career ==
In 1990, Hindawi served as a Human Rights consultant for the development work in Yemen and then worked as a research consultant in Lebanon. He then transferred to the UN and worked in Haiti for almost three years, assisting in the International Civilian Mission in Haiti (MICIVIH), a UN/OAS scheme. Hindawi then began work in 1995 as the Editor-In-Chief of the London Office of the United Press International, in the Arabic Services.

He left this position when he was requested to serve as the First Chairman of Iraq's first Independent Electoral Commission with the task of organizing Iraq's first multi-party elections in half a century. He then continued this position until mid-2007.

After IHEC, Hindawi then re-joined the United Nations, this time serving in the Iraqi branch (known as the UNAMI), as the Senior Political Advisor, until 2009. In 2010, he combined his position and became the Senior Political and Electoral advisor.

In 2015, Hindawi assumed the position of Advisor to the Iraqi PresidentFuad Masum and continued in this role until the appointment of Barham Salih in 2018.

In 2021; Hindawi was appointed as the senior Electoral advisor to the then- Iraqi Prime Minister Mustafa Al-Kadhimi.

In 2022, Hindawi was appointed to the role of Assistant Secretary-General of the League of Arab States

== Bibliography ==
Hindawi has published 11 books, mostly Research-based, in both Arabic and French.
