= Hüseyn Kürdoğlu =

Azerbaijani poet

- Born: Hüseyn Hasanoğlu Alishanov; June 15, 1934; Əhmədli, Lachin
- Died: July 12, 2003; Baku
- Resting place: Xırdalan
- Occupation: Poet
- Language: Azerbaijani, Kurdish
- Citizenship: Soviet Union; Azerbaijan
- Literary movement: Azerbaijan Writers Union

Hüseyn Kürdoğlu previously known as Hüseyn Hasanoğlu Alishanov (June 15, 1934 - July 12, 2003) was a Kurdish-Azerbaijani poet, literary critic, member of Azerbaijan Writers' Union since 1973.

== Life ==
Huseyn Kurdoglu was born on June 15, 1934, in the village of Ahmadli (Mollamahmadi) of the Lachin region of Azerbaijan. He was Kurdish.

He received his secondary education at many different schools, including Ahmedli village secondary school, Agdam city secondary school No. 1, Lachin city secondary school and Khanliq village school of Gubadli district. He entered the Faculty of Philology of ASU (1953–1958). He started his career as an editor of the literary drama department at the Azerbaijan Television and Radio Broadcasting Committee. Then he worked as a junior researcher at the Azerbaijan Institute of Oriental Studies (1960). Until the end of his life, he worked at the Institute of Literature named after EA Nizami of Azerbaijan (since 1993). He started his literary creativity early and published his first poems in the "Soviet Kurdistan" newspaper published in Lachin district when he was in his final year of high school. His first couplet "Gözeldir" was published in 1950 in the newspaper "Azerbaijani Yvangari" and began to appear regularly in periodicals. He was also engaged in literary translation. He was one of the founders of the "Ronahi Kurdish Cultural Center" in 1990 and the newspaper "Denge Kurd" ("Voice of the Kurds") in 1992, officially operating in Azerbaijan. He died on July 12, 2003, in Baku and was buried in Khirdalan cemetery.

== Works ==
- Morning songs, 1963
- A walk around my country, 1968
- Rock flowers, 1970
- My hometown, 1973
- Flower smile, 1975
- I went to my father's house, 1978
- Four-string crane, 1979
- Wedding caravan, 1981
- Crane's voice, 1985
- The lambs went up the mountain, 1985
- The Kurdish poet Abdullah Gora, 1969
- This world is a caravan road, 1989
- My wounded land, my wounded love, 1997.
- I came to faith, 1999.
- Our intelligence is our intelligence, 1999.
- My word is a sacrifice to my country, 2005.
- Ayta's songs, 2009
