= Hussein al-Ali =

Syrian politician

- حسين عبد الرحمن العلي

Member of the People's Assembly
- Incumbent
- Assumed office 1 July 2026
- Appointed by: Ahmed al-Sharaa

Personal details
- Born: 1999 (age 26–27) Mount Simeon District, Syria

Hussein al-Ali (Arabic: حسين عبد الرحمن العلي; born 1999) is a Syrian politician and ex-rebel fighter who has served as a member of the People's Assembly since July 2026.

== Biography ==
He was born in 1999 in Mount Simeon District, Aleppo Governorate. He is a former rebel fighter who was seriously injured during the Syrian civil war.

Following the release of the Syrian presidential list, she became a member of the People's Assembly.
