= Hüseyin Köroğlu =

Turkish actor and film director

Hüseyin Köroğlu (born 18 June 1964 in Cyprus) is a Turkish actor.

== Partial filmography ==
- Gazoz Ağacı (1986)
- Vurguna İnmek (1990, TV Mini-Series)
- Sevdiğim Adam (1990)
- Koltuk Belası (1990) – Akın
- Gizli Merkez (1991, TV Mini-Series)
- Mahallenin Muhtarları (1992)
- Şaşkın Gelin (1993)
- Çılgın Aşıklar (1993)
- Yorgun Savaşçı (1993)
- Şaban Askerde (1993, TV Series) – Yakışıklı
- Tatlı Betüş (1993, TV Series)
- Zzzzt FM (1994)
- Geçmişin İzleri (1994)
- Palavra Aşklar (1995, TV Series)
- Bir Sevgi Anonsu (1995)
- Ağustos Böceklerini Unutma (1996)
- Garip Karşılaşma (1996)
- Bir Nefes Sevgi (1996)
- Baba Evi (1997) – Kaan
- İlişkiler (1997, TV Series) – Murat
- Kayikçi (1999) – Hristos
- Tatlı Hayat (2001) – Tayfur
- Hititler (2002)
- Canım Kocacığım (2002) – Poyraz
- Yaşamın Kıyısında (2003)
- Zalim (2003, TV Series) – Aras
- Tatil Aşkları (2004, TV Mini-Series) – Kaan
- Sinema Bir Mucizedir / Büyülü Fener (2005) – Otello
- Hayatım Sana Feda (2006, TV Series) – Hakan
- İlk Aşkım (2006) – Sinan
- Doktorlar (2006) – Ümit
- Şölen (2007) – Hüseyin
- Kendi Okulumuza Doğru (2008) – Kazım Bey
- Görev Kıbrıs (2008) – Derviş
- Kollama (2008, TV Series) – Pikeas
- Tuzak (2009)
- Kara Murat: Mora'nin atesi (2015)
