= Hussain Hassan Shehu =

Nigerian politician

Member of the House of Representatives
- Incumbent
- Assumed office 2023
- Constituency: Nassarawa Federal Constituency

Personal details
- Born: 1 November 1978 (age 47) Kano State, Nigeria
- Party: New Nigeria People's Party
- Occupation: Politician

Hussain Hassan Shehu (born 1 November 1978) is a Nigerian politician from Kano State, Nigeria. He represents the Nassarawa Federal Constituency in the National Assembly as a member of the House of Representatives. He was elected under the New Nigeria People's Party (NNPP) and has held office since 2023.
