= Hussein Eid =

41 writer

- Born: 1946 (age 79–80); Cairo
- Education: Bachelor degree in Commerce

Hussein Eid (Arabic: حسين عيد) (born 1946) is an Egyptian writer, born in Cairo, got a bachelor's degree in commerce. He has several books in fiction and novel and he has significant books in literary translation. For the past two decades he was specialized in criticism and has 13 books such as (Garcia Marquez and the fall of dictatorship) and (The concept of Power and Religion in Fathi Ghanem's Creative Experience).

== Publications ==
Najeeb Mahfouz

Hussein Eid published many books about the famous writer Naguib Mahfouz.

- Naguib Mahfouz: a literal autobiography, The Egyptian Lebanese House, 2006, pages: 326.
- Naguib Mahfouz: An invitation to staunch, The Supreme Council of Culture, series: The Year of Naguib Mahfouz, 2011, pages: 209.
- Naguib Mahfouz: The journey of death in his literature, The General Authority of Cultural Palaces, 1997, pages: 340.

The Capsule of Literature Masterpiece

- The Capsule of Literature Masterpiece part 8, pages: 210.
- The Capsule of Literature Masterpiece part 10, pages: 186.
- The Capsule of Literature Masterpiece part 11, The Arabic House Library for books, 2013, pages: 242.
- The Capsule of Literature Masterpiece part 12, The Arabic House Library for books, 2013, pages: 192.
- The Capsule of Literature Masterpiece part 13, The Arabic House Library for books, 2014, pages: 197.
  Translations
- The story (material, structure, style, writing for cinema principles, author: Robert Mackie, translation: Hussein Eid, Supreme Council of Culture, 2006. (original title: Al Qessah)
- The Treasure, author: Salma Lagerlof, translation: Hussien Eid, The Egyptian Lebanese house, 2009. (original title: Al Kanz)
- The Devil and Tobacco, author: Ryunosuke Akutagawa, translation: Hussein Eid, Khan Books for Publishing and Distribution, 2012. (original title: Al Shaytan wa Al Tabgh)
- When the East Wind Blows: A Collection of Stories, The New Culture, 2010 (original title: Heen Tahob Reyah Al Sharq)

== Others ==
- That Amazing World: Conversations with International Writers, Ministry of Culture – The General Authority of Cultural Palaces, pages: 268. (original title: Thalek Al Alam Al modhesh: Hewarat ma Ketab Alameeyen)
- The Eleventh Train, House of Acquaintances, 1983, pages: 94. (original title: Qetar Al Hadeyah Ashr)
- Garcia Marquez and the fall of dictatorship, The Egyptian General Book Organization, 1988, pages:135.(original title: Garcia Marquez wa Ofoul Al Dectatoryah)
- Hikmat Fahmay's Memoirs: Secrets of the Relationship Between Sadat and German Intelligence, Freedom House for Press, Printing and Publishing, 1990, pages:213. (original title: Mothakarta Hekmat Fehmi :Asrar Al Alaqa'a wa AlMokhabart AlAmanyah)
- Youssef Idris, Conflict and Confrontation, The General Authority of Cultural Palaces, 1991, pages:183 (original title:Yousef Edress Al Sera'a wa Al Mowajaha)
- Creativity of literature, 1997, pages:242. (original title: Al Ebda'a Al Adabi)
- The Mongoose Eye, House of Tree for Publishing and Distributions, 1997, pages:125. (original title: Ain Al Nms)
- The Expatriated Arab Intellectual, The Egyptian Lebanese House, 1999, pages:108. (original title: Al Mothaqaf Al Moghtareb)
- The Concept of Power and Religion in Fathi Ghanem's Creative Experience, Civil Development Center, 1999, pages:141. (original title: Mafhoom Al Soultah wa Al Deen fee Tajroba Fatehi Ghanem Al Ebdaeya'ah)
- The Magic of Creativity: with Arab and Foreign Books, The Egyptian Lebanese House, 2003, pages:240. (original title: Sehr Al Ebda'a : Ma Katab Arab wa Ajaneb)
- The Arabic Short Story: Causes and Visions, The Supreme Council of Culture, 2009. (original title: Al Qesah Al Arabeyah Al Qaseerah: Qathayah wa Roa'a)
- With the Nobel book "Rare Dialogues", The Egyptian Lebanese House, 2010, pages:408. (original title: Ma Ketab Nowel)
- The Palestinian Causes and Literature: Yahya Khalaf as a model, House of Fences, 2010, pages:138. (original title: Qatheyat Palestein wa Al Adab: Yehiah Yakhlaf Namothaj)
- Experience of Creativity with Arab and Foreign Writers, General Egyptian Book Organization, 2012, pages: 327. (original title: Tajroba Al Ebda'a ma Ketab Arab wa Ajanab)
- Literature and Resisting Tyranny, The General Authority of Cultural Palaces, 2014. (original title: Al Adab wa Moqawamat Al Toghyan)
- Migration to the Old Cities, Cairo: The Supreme Council of Culture, 1984, pages:100 (original title: Al Hejra'a naho Al Moden Al Qadeemah)
- Fathi Ghanem, Life and Creativity, The General Authority of Cultural Palaces, 1995, pages:269 (original title: Fatehi Ghanem, wa Al Ebda'a)
- Literature Studies in Story and Novel, Cairo: University Culture, Publishing Department, 1989, pages:126.( original title: Derasat Adabeyah fee Al Qesah wa Al Rowayah)
- Little Blue Birds, 2007. (original title: Asafeer Sagheerah Zarqa'a)
