= Hüseyin Bağcı =

Turkish academic (born 1959)

Professor Hüseyin Bağcı
- Born: 29 December 1959 (age 66); Uzunköprü, Edirne, Turkey
- Occupations: Academic and author

Academic background
- Education: University of Bonn
- Website: https://avesis.metu.edu.tr/bagci

Hüseyin Bağcı (born 29 December 1959) is a Turkish academic, author, and the president of the Foreign Policy Institute. He is also a professor at METU, Faculty of Economic and Administrative Sciences, Department of International Relations.

== Education ==
Bağcı completed his undergraduate studies in 1985 and later earned a doctorate, both from the University of Bonn in Germany.
