= Hussein El-Wad =

Tunisian academic, poet, critic, and novelist (1948–2018)

Hussein el-Wad (Arabic: حسين الواد) (born 20 March 1948 - died 02 June 2018) was a Tunisian academic, poet, critic and novelist. He was born in Moknine in northern Tunisia and studied for his doctorate at the University of Tunis. He was also a professor at King Saud University in Riyadh.

As a scholar of Arabic literature, Al-Wad's output included books on the works of Al Maarri, Al Mutanabbi, and Abu Tamam. He was a novelist too. His first novel Scents of the City (2010/11) won the Golden Comar Award in Tunisia, and his second novel His Excellency the Minister was shortlisted for the 2013 Arabic Booker Prize.
