= Hossein Hafezian =

- Education: University of Tehran
- Known for: Specializing in the role of women in Muslim countries
- Scientific career
- Fields: Political science

Hossein Hafezian is an Iranian political scientist and author specializing in the role of women in Muslim countries.

== Biography ==
He received his PhD degree in political science from the University of Tehran in 2004. He has been working on women's issues since 1996 and has published in 2001 Women and the Revolution: The Untold Story concerning the role Iranian women played during the Iranian Revolution. He co-authored a book on the Role of Women in the Muslim Countries' Development published by Tehran University Press in March 2007.

From 2000, Hafezian started working as a senior research fellow at the Center for Middle East Strategic Studies. He is the assistant editor of Discourse: An Iranian Quarterly, and a member of the editorial staff of Middle East Studies Quarterly, both published by the Center. He has written extensively on women's issues, development, and Middle East politics in various Persian, English and Arabic journals.

Hafezianis a member of the board of directors and treasurer of the Iranian Association of Women's Studies since 2005, an NGO which promotes scientific knowledge on women's issues and helps introduce better policies for the improvement of women's conditions. He has rendered lectures and participated in numerous international conferences held in Iran, Asia, the Middle East, Europe, and the United States during the past seven years.

He was the chair of the Department of Political Science at the Islamic Azad University at Karaj from 2006 to 2010.

== Publications ==
The following is a partial list of his publications:

- State, Elites and Development in the Middle East, Tehran: Center for Strategic Research, 2009. [Persian]
- The Role of Women in Development of Muslim Countries (with Eleheh Koolaee), Tehran: University of Tehran Press, 2007. [Persian]
- Women and the Revolution: The Untold Story, Tehran: Andisheh Bartar Publications, 2001. [Persian]
- As translator: Gerhard von Glahn, Law among Nations: An Introduction to Public International Law, Vol. 2, Tehran: Mizan, 2000.
- "Iran-GCC Relations under President Ahmadinejad: 2005–2009," Iranian Review of Foreign Affairs, Vol. 1, No. 4, Winter 2011.
- "The Islamic Republic of Iran and the South Caucasus Republics," Journal of Iranian Studies, Vol. 43, Issue 3, June 2010, pages 391–409.
- "Globalization and State-Society Relations in Egypt," Political Studies Quarterly, Vol. 3, No. 7, Spring 2010. [Persian]
- "The Future of Development in the Middle East: Challenges and Prospects," Political Quarterly, Journal of the Faculty of Law and Political Science, University of Tehran, Vol. 40, No. 1, Spring 2010. [Persian]
- "Relations with the Arab World," in Iran Today: An Encyclopedia of Life in the Islamic Republic, Edited by Mehran Kamrava and Manochehr Dorraj, Westport, Connecticut: Greenwood Press, 2008, pages. 435–441.
- "Iran in the Middle East: Future Regional Trends," Journal of Central Eurasia Studies, University of Tehran, Vol. 2, No. 5, Winter 2010. [Persian]
