= Huseyn Razi =

Azerbaijani poet, playwright, and public figure (1924–1998)

- Born: 1924; Ordubad, Nakhchivan, Azerbaijan SSR
- Died: 1998; Nakhchivan, Azerbaijan
- Occupation: Poet and journalist

Huseyn Razi or Hüseyn Mammad oglu Rzayev (Azerbaijani:Hüseyn Razi; b. 1924; Ordubad, Nakhchivan, Azerbaijan SSR – d. 1998; Nakhchivan, Azerbaijan) was an Azerbaijani poet, playwright, and public figure. Honored Worker of the Nakhichevan Autonomous Republic (1981), Member of the Union of Azerbaijani Writers and the Azerbaijan SSR (1984).

== Life ==
Huseyn Razi was born on October 17, 1924, in the Ordubad district of Nakhchivan. After graduating from the Ordubad pedagogical school, he worked as a teacher in the village of Arazin, Julfa region. In 1943, he was drafted into the Soviet Army, participated in the Great Patriotic War in the battles for the liberation of the cities of Orel, Bryansk, Kursk, and was wounded. After recovery, he graduated from a training school for junior aviation specialists, served in a separate long-range reconnaissance aviation regiment on the Second Baltic Front, and was demobilized in 1945. In 1959, he graduated from the Faculty of Philology of the Azerbaijan State University named after S. M. Kirov. After the war, he worked as a teacher in an eight-year school, director of a rural club, editor at Nakhichevan Radio, literary worker at the Sharg Gapisy newspaper, and special correspondent for the Azerbaijan Telegraph Agency in Nakhichevan Autonomous Republic. From 1962 to 1989 he worked as head of the Literature and Art department of the Sharg Gapysy newspaper.

The first poems of Huseyn Razi were published in the newspaper "Sharg Gapysy" and the magazine "Revolution and Culture". Along with poetic creativity, he was also engaged in poetic translation from Russian, translated poems by M. Isakovsky, L. Martynov, S. Mikhalkov, S. Shipachev, O. Shchetinsky, R. Gamzatov, R. Babadzhan, A. Barto. Razi's poems have been translated into Turkish, Tatar, Farsi, French and Russian. Razi's plays "Odlu Diyar", "Tarla Gözəli", "Günəş" and others were staged in theaters.

He died on February 27, 1998, and was buried in Nakhchivan.
