= Hosein Rashti Najafi =

Writer

Ayatollah Hosin Rashti Najafi was a Shia mujtahid, theologian, jurist and man of narration. He counted as an eminent mujtahid among Shia. His most important writings are Summarizing Jurisprudence and Glossary on Kefayah in Principles of Jurisprudence.

== Biography ==
Hosein Rashti Kazemeini considered as an eminent jurist and mujtahid among Whia society. He completed his education in jurisprudence and principles in Najaf. He learned from eminent masters such as Mohammad-Kazem Khorasani and Mohammed Kazem Yazdi. His tomb located in Kazimein in Iraq. He undertook the teaching of jurisprudence and principles both in Najaf and in kazemein and many participated in his courses in religious sciences.

== Works ==
- Summarizing the jurisprudence
- A glossary on The book of Kefayah
