= Mehrab Hossain =

Mehrab Hossain can refer to:

- Mehrab Hossain (cricketer, born 1978), Bangladeshi cricketer
- Mehrab Hossain (cricketer, born 1987), Bangladeshi cricketer
- Mehrab Hossain (cricketer, born 1991), Bangladeshi cricketer
