= Hussein Al Uzri =

Iranian politician

Hussein Isam Al Uzri (Arabic: حسين عصام الازري) is an Iranian politician. He was selected as the first Chairman of the Board of Directors and President of the Trade Bank of Iraq (TBI) in 2003, after the US invasion of Iraq. In 2011, he fled from Iraq to avoid facing charges related to an investigation of TBI by Prime Minister Nouri Al Maliki. In June 2011, Reuters reported that the Iraqi government had issued an arrest warrant for Al Uzri, stemming from an investigation into the Bank. In the same year, Al Uzri featured in The Middle East Magazine's 'Top 50 Arabs'.

During Hussein Al Uzri’s stewardship, TBI grew to become the largest bank in Iraq. It issued almost all government letters of credit, which in Iraq's state-driven economy was a substantial number. Investigations by Iraq's government claimed the bank was troubled, despite regular auditing and annual reporting, the latest of which was published in 2010 on the Bank's website and was audited by PWC. Though state-owned, Al Uzri successfully operated the Bank commercially, overseeing a number of landmark successes and achievements.

Al Uzri previously worked at Card Tech for 20 years in banking, commercial and project management across the Middle East, Europe and the former Soviet Union (FSU). Between 1992 and 2000 Mr. Al Uzri worked in Moscow as manager of INPASS, a joint venture between Finland’s OKO Bank and UK financial technology firm CTL. In this capacity Mr. Al Uzri was responsible for the introduction of a number of financial services in the FSU including the first VISA cards (1992), the first Electronic Point of Sale machines (1992), and the first Automatic Teller Machines (1993). From 2000-2003, Al Uzri was CTL's general manager for the Former Soviet Union and the Middle East, based at their London headquarters.

Al Uzri is a 1985 graduate of Texas Tech University, where he received a degree in electrical and computer engineering.

== Achievements at TBI ==
Under the stewardship of Mr. Al Uzri the Trade Bank of Iraq quickly developed into a highly credible and effective organization. In a short period of time, TBI built relationships with an international network of 134 prime banks covering 63 cities in 39 countries. This gave TBI a global reach, a competitive advantage and the ability to provide a diverse range of services. By the end of 2010 TBI’s equity was US$1.5 billion and the Bank had total assets of over US$15 billion. Profits at the Bank in 2010 were $361 million.

Early success saw TBI sign agreements with 17 of the largest Export Credit Agencies in the world, making it one of the first Iraqi banks to receive lines of credit from major international financial institutions. Among the many 'firsts' the bank can claim are the introduction of Iraq's first fully automated online banking system, the first Iraqi bank to issue VISA credit cards, and the development of the first nationwide network of ATMs.

Building on early success, Al Uzri’s leadership introduced modern, innovative products and services to the Iraqi market. These included Project Finance, Salary Accounts, Savings Accounts, and Credit Cards.

In 2011, TBI employed over 450 people, operating across fifteen branches throughout Iraq. More than 5,000 Letters of Credit (L/Cs) had been issued by early 2011 totalling US$65 billion. TBI was voted ‘Best Trade Bank in the Middle East' by the Trade and Forfeiting Review in 2007, 2008 and 2010.

Under Al Uzri, TBI engaged EY, and subsequently PWC, to audit the Bank’s systems and annual results. EY carried out this function for five years and PWC for two (2009 and 2010). No concerns were raised regarding the bank’s operations and results and reports were published on TBI’s website.

Following the removal of Al Uzri in 2011, the Prime Minister’s office appointed Mrs. Hamdia Al Jaf, a close friend of the Al Maliki family, to take over leadership of the Bank.

Formerly a branch manager at Radifain Bank, Al Jaf’s tenure has become synonymous with TBI’s decline. The Bank has not published an annual report since 2010 and its operations are considered to be mysterious. Since 2011, no financial statements have been published by independent auditors. The bank has lost its semi-independent status and is now under the direct control of the Prime Minister's office.
