= Hussein Fahmi (footballer) =

Egyptian footballer

Personal information
- Date of birth: 19 May 1981 (age 45)
- Place of birth: Cairo, Egypt
- Height: 1.67 m (5 ft 6 in)
- Position: Midfielder

Team information
- Current team: El-Entag El-Harby
- Number: 20

Youth career
- Al Ahly

Senior career*
Years	Team	Apps	(Gls)
2002–2011	Ittihad Alexandria	+100	(+5)
2012–	El-Entag El-Harby		
- * Club domestic league appearances and goals as of August 01,2012 ‡ National team caps and goals as of August 01,2012

Hussein Fahmi (Arabic: حسين فهمي) (born 1 January 1984) is an Egyptian footballer who currently plays for Egyptian Premier League club Itthad Alexandria. He is a tireless midfielder, who can also play as a defensive midfielder or an attacking one.
