= Hossein Farhady =

- حسین فرهادی
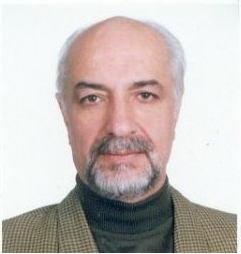
- Prof. Dr. Hossein Farhady
- Born: 1947 (age 78–79); Chaldoran, Iran
- Occupations: linguist, English language and literature professor
- Writing career
- Language: Persian

Hossein Farhady (Persian: حسین فرهادی) is an Iranian applied linguist with more than forty years of studying, teaching and researching in and out of Iran. He has worked at universities including University of Teachers Education, Iran University of Science and Technology, Tehran in Iran, UCLA, Texas A &M, USC, and University of Shenandoah in the United States, American University of Armenia in Yerevan, Armenia, and Yeditepe University in Istanbul, Turkey. During his professional career, he has trained many applied linguists and university lecturers.

== Early life ==
Farhady was born in the city of Chaldoran, West Azerbaijan Province in Iran in 1947. He completed his primary and secondary education in the same city.

== Higher Education ==
In 1967 Farhady was admitted to Tehran University Iran where he completed B.A. program in English language and literature. After teaching English as a foreign languages at high schools in Iran for 6 years, he was granted a scholarship to continue his studies at University of California, Los Angeles where he completed Masters and Ph.D. programs in four years 1976 to 1980. The short tenor of this achievement has been a record in the history of UCLA.

== Academic life ==
Farhady has presented at conferences at various levels of technicality including Language Testing Research Colloquium (LTRC), American Association for Applied Linguistics (AAAL), European Association of Language Testing Association (EALTA), TESOL Convention, Asia TEFL, Second Language Acquisition Forum, Southern California Association of Language Assessment Research (SCALAR), East Coast Language Testing (ECOLT), and Japan Association of Language Testing (JALT). These diverse activities have given him opportunities to write at different levels of technicality on different areas of applied linguistics including language testing, classroom assessment, English for Specific Purposes (ESP), reading, translation and a number of others. The bulk of his work has concentrated on research in language testing and assessment.
