= Hossein Kamyab =

Iranian footballer

Personal information
- Date of birth: 4 January 1995 (age 31)
- Place of birth: Tehran, Iran
- Height: 1.77 m (5 ft 10 in)
- Position: Winger

Youth career
- –2016: Saipa

Senior career*
Years	Team	Apps	(Gls)
2016–2021	Saipa	54	(1)
2021–2022	Malavan	7	(1)
2022–2023	Nirooye Zamini		
2023–2024	Bahman Javan		
- * Club domestic league appearances and goals as of 7 June 2022

Hossein Kamyab (Persian: حسين کامياب; born 4 January 1995) is an Iranian footballer who plays as a winger.
