= Hussein Pasha Hosni =

Personal assistant of King Farouk I

Hussein Pacha Hosny حسين باشا حسني
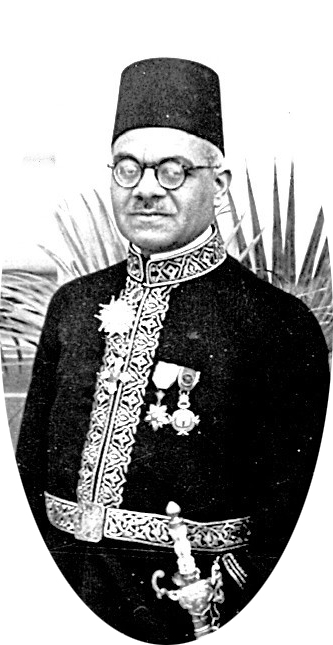
- Portrait of Hussein Pacha
- Born: 2 December 1896; Cairo, Egypt
- Died: 26 November 1985 (aged 88); Cairo, Egypt

Dr. Hussein Pacha Hosni (born Cairo, 2 December 1896; died 26 November 1985) was the personal assistant of King Farouk I, the last ruler of Egypt.

== Early life and education ==
Hosni was born in Cairo on 2 December 1896 into a conservative Egyptian noble family of Caucasian and Albanian origin.

He obtained his bachelor's degree with distinction from the Supreme School for Teachers, later obtaining a doctorate in history and politics from the University of Montpellier in France, with a thesis on "Suez Canal et La Politique Egyptienne." He pursued further studies at the Sorbonne in Paris, as well as Oxford and Cambridge Universities.

Hosni was fluent in Turkish, French, English, Italian and German.

In his early years, three incidents attracted his attention and increased his political awareness: the rise and success of Turkey and Japan, the Denshawai Incident, and the rise of Mustafa Kamil Pasha, cofounder of the National Party and a strong advocate of independence from Britain.

== Career ==
After his studies, Hosni was appointed assistant to the director of education and remained in that post for a couple of years. During this period, he presented to the director of the Royal Domains and Trusts, Naguib Pasha, a proposal to translate and make available important documents relating to modern Egypt, which he found in the archives of London, Paris and Vienna, to researchers and scholars.

In February 1925, he was transferred to the Foreign Office and was appointed vice-consul in Izmir, Turkey, followed by becoming consul in Naples. In 1928, he was selected to be King Fouad's delegate to the Imam of Yemen. He later became assistant to the Chief of Cabinet and then Secretary for Ceremonies. After that, Hosni was appointed as the king's private secretary and confidant.

Hosni served the King until the end of his reign on 26 July 1952.

== Sources ==
"Days With King Farouk" Memoirs of HRH Farouk's Personal Secretary/Assistant Hussein Pasha Hosni Written in Arabic
