= Hussein Issa =

Hussein Ibrahim Issa
- Born: September 1947
- Died: 5 March 2000; Deheishe Refugee Camp

Hussein Ibrahim Issa (September 1947 – 5 March 2000) was a Palestinian activist for nonviolence, and founder of the Hope Flowers School in Bethlehem. Issa devoted his life to teaching peace, democracy and coexistence.

== Biography ==
Issa, the son of a well-to-do Palestinian farmer, was born in 1947. His father died when he was two years old. The family's properties were confiscated by the newly founded state of Israel, and they were forced to relocate to the Deheishe Refugee Camp.

Despite the harsh conditions in which he lived and his violent surroundings, Issa became a nonviolent activist in 1970.

Issa graduated from Bethlehem University in 1980, with a Bachelor of Arts in Social Work and a Diploma of Education.

In 1984 he founded the Al-Amal Child Care Center. The center later evolved into the Hope Flowers School, the only school in Palestine to teach the philosophy of peace and democratic education.

Hussein Ibrahim Issa died of a heart disease at the age of 52 in an Israeli hospital.
