= Husayn Ali Jum'ah =

Syrian literary scholar and poet

- حسين جمعة
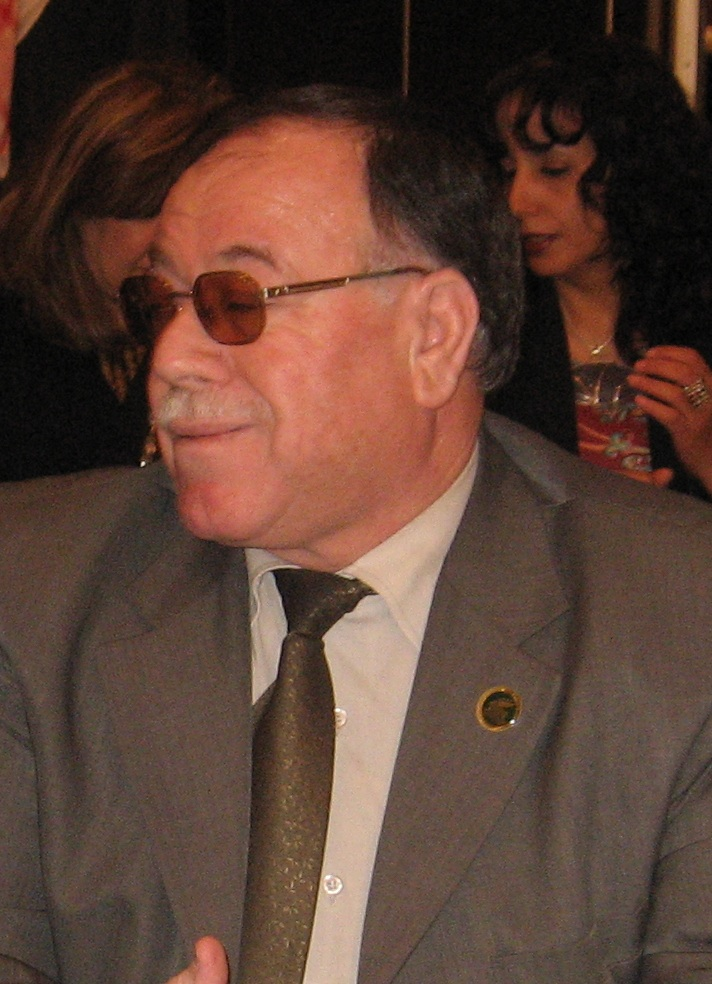
- Jum'ah, January 2008
- Born: 4 September 1949 (age 76); Yabroud , Damascus, First Syrian Republic,
- Education: Damascus University
- Occupations: literary scholar, poet and academic
- Writing career
- Language: Arabic
- Period: 1983

Husayn Ali Jum'ah (Arabic: حسين علي جمعة, romanized: Ḥusayn Jumʻah; born 4 September 1949) is a Syrian literary scholar and poet, known for his studies on classical Arabic literature and headed Arab Writers Union from 2005 until 2011.

== Biography and career ==
Hussein Ali Jumaa was born in Yabroud north of Damascus on 4 September 1949 and grew up in the Damascene Al-Nawfara neighborhood near the Umayyad Mosque. He obtained his high school diploma in the city of Damascus in 1967, then joined the Institute of Teachers’ Preparation and obtained his certificate before joining the Faculty of Arts at the University of Damascus to obtain a Bachelor’s degree in Arabic in 1978, then a Postgraduate Diploma and then a Master’s. He received his PhD in Arts from Damascus University in 1987, then joined the Arab Writers Union in the early 1990s.

He was a principal of the "Khair al-Din al-Zarkali" secondary school from 1977 to 1984. He was appointed as professor of classical Arabic literature at the University of Damascus, since 1983, and at the Qatar University in the Faculty of Humanities during 1992 to 1997. He started fiction writing in 1982, and then changed to non-fiction in his writings. He was appointed president of the Arab Writers Union on 4 September 2005, succeeding Ali Uqla Arsan, who had headed it since 1977. In 2011 he was replaced by Ghassan Wannous. He has been criticized for his political views. In July 2011, an Egyptian writer, Magdy Yusuf, denounced him as the head of the Writers Union for his support of what Yusuf described as “the repression and killing of peaceful Syrian demonstrators by the Syrian regime”.

== Bibliography ==
His literature-related books:

- Arabic: الحيوان في الشعر الجاهلي, romanized: al-Ḥayawān fī al-shiʻr al-Jāhilī, 1989 ISBN 9789933439385
- Arabic: مشهد الحيوان في القصيدة الجاهلية, 1990 ISBN 9789933439477
- Arabic: الملل والنحل للشهرستاني: عرض وتعريف, 1990
- Arabic: قصيدة الرثاء جذور وأطوار؛ دراسة تحليلية في مراثي الجاهلية وصدر الإسلام, romanized: Qaṣīdaẗ al-riṯāʾ - ǧuḏūr wa aṭwār dirāsaẗ tahlīliyyaẗ fī marāṯī al-ǧāhiliyyaẗ wa ṣadr al- Islām, 1991/1998
- Arabic: مختارات من الأدب في صدر الإسلام, 1992/2006
- Arabic: قراءات في أدب العصر الأموي, 1992-1993
- Arabic: في جمالية الكلمة, 2002 ISBN 9789933439224
- Arabic: إبن المقفع : سيرة إبداع بين حضارتين العربية والفارسية : قراءة فكرية نقدية وادبية, 2003
- Arabic: إبداع ونقد: قراءة جديدة للإبداع في العصر العباسي, romanized: Ibdāʻ wa-naqd : qirāʼah jadīdah lil-ibdāʻ fī al-ʻAṣr al-ʻAbbāsī, 2003
- Arabic: المسبار في النقد الأدبي, 2003 ISBN 9789933439224
- Arabic: جمالية الخبر والإنشاء ـ دراسة جمالية أسلوبية, romanized: Jamālīyat al-khabar wa-al-inshāʼ : dirāsah balāghīyah jamālīyah naqdīyah, 2005
- Arabic: التقابل الجمالي في النص القرآني, 2005
- Arabic: مرايا للالتقاء والارتقاء بين الأدبين العربي والفارسي, 2006
- Arabic: اللغة العربية ؛ إرث وارتقاء حياة, romanized: al-Lughah al-ʻArabīyah : irth wa-irtiqāʼ ḥayāh, 2008
- Arabic: ملامح في الأدب المقارن, 2009
- Arabic: القوس والوتر, romanized: al-Qaws wa-al-watar, 2002
- Arabic: الصوت والصدى: سوانح الرواية والرواية في الاردن, romanized: al-Ṣawt wa-al-ṣadá : sawāniḥ fī al-riwāyah wa-al-riwāyah fī al-Urdun, 2002
- Arabic: سالم النحاس أديبا وإنسانا, romanized: Sālim al-Naḥḥās adīban wa-insānan, 2010
- Arabic: علامات في الأدب الفلسطيني المعاصر, romanized: ʻAlāmāt fī al-adab al-Filasṭīnī al-muʻāṣir, 2012
- Arabic: بانوراما التراث السردي فـي الأردن وفلسطين؛ دراسة تحليلية ونقدية, romanized: al-Waḥdah al-fannīyah fī al-qaṣīdah al-jāhilīyah : dirāsah taḥlīlīyah wa-naqdīyah, 2013
- Arabic: اتجليات النكبة والمقاومة في الفكر والأدب العربي المعاصر, 2013
- Arabic: تجليات التصوف وجماليته في الأدبين العربي والفارسي حتى القرن الثامن هجري ؛ دراسة فكرية بلاغية نقدية, romanized: Tajallīyāt al-taṣawwuf wa-jamālīyatuhu fī al-adabayn al-ʻArabī wa-al-Fārisī ḥattá al-qarn al-thāmin al-Hijrī : dirāsah fikrīyah, adabīyah-naqdīyah, 2013 ISBN 9789933211844
- Arabic: ملامح في الأدب المقاوم ؛ فلسطين نموذجا, 2013
- Arabic: الوحدة الفنية في القصيدة الجاهلية؛ دراسة تحليلية ونقدية, romanized: al-Waḥdah al-fannīyah fī al-qaṣīdah al-jāhilīyah : dirāsah taḥlīlīyah wa-naqdīyah, 2018 ISBN 9789933188344
- Arabic: الفارس الأسير أبو فراس الحمداني - قراءة جديدة في حياته وشعره, romanized: al-Fāris al-asīr Abū Firās al-Ḥamdānī : qirāʼah jadīdah fī ḥayātihi wa-shiʻrih, 2019 ISBN 9789933188344
- Arabic: قمر كيلاني ... الريادة والالتزام, romanized: Qamar Kīlānī... al-riyādah wa-al-iltizām, 2019

Non-literary:

- Arabic: مشروع القومية العربية إلى أين؟: دراسة, romanized: Mashrūʻ al-qawmīyah al-ʻArabīyah ilá ayn? : dirāsah, 2006
- Arabic: المقاومة - قراءة في التاريخ والواقع والآفاق, romanized: al-Muqāwamah : qirāʼah fī al-tārīkh wa-al-wāqiʻ wa-al-āfāq : dirāsah, 2007
- Arabic: قضايا في الفكر السياسي و القومي, romanized: Mashrūʻ al-qawmīyah al-ʻArabīyah ilá ayn? : dirāsah, 2009
- Arabic: من القدس الى غزة؛ دراسة فكرية سياسية, romanized: Min al-Quds ilá Ghazzah : dirāsah fikrīyah wa-siyāsīyah, 2011
- Arabic: حراس الكلمة والموقف, romanized: Ḥurrās al-kalimah wa-al-mawqif, 2012 ISBN 9789933210885
- Arabic: قضايا ومبدعون, 2012 ISBN 9789933210953
- Arabic: سورية الاستهداف والمؤامرة, romanized: Sūrīyah, al-istihdāf wa-al-muʼāmarah, 2012
- Arabic: ثقافة المقاومة ؛ إعادة بناء الذات العربية, romanized: Thaqāfat al-muqāwamah : iʻādat bināʼ al-dhāt al-ʻArabīyah, 2014
- Arabic: أسماء في الذاكرة ؛ دراسة الشخصيات, 2014 ISBN 9789933211554
- Arabic: الأزمة السورية وثقافة التكفير الإرهابي, romanized: al-Azmah al-Sūrīyah wa-thaqāfat al-takfīr al-irhābī, 2015
- Arabic: شبابيك وأبواب في عالم الكتب والكتاب, romanized: Shabābīk wa-abwāb fī ʻālam al-kutub wa-al-kuttāb, 2016
- Arabic: الثقافة الوطنية والتحديات الراهنة, romanized: al-Thaqāfah al-waṭanīyah wa-al-taḥaddīyāt al-rāhinah, 2018 ISBN 9789933211554

Poetry collections:

- Arabic: أوراق روح تحترق, 2015
- Arabic: سنابل القلق , 2015
- Arabic: ظلال الشفق , 2015
- Arabic: رحلة القيثارة , 2015
- Arabic: ضفاف الشوق , 2015
- Arabic: خوابي الكلام , 2016
- Arabic: أغاني الينابيع الصافية , 2016
- Arabic: شهد الأوابد , 2016
- Arabic: ترانيم الذات العطشى , 2017
- Arabic: عبق الاحتراق , 2017
