= Hossein Fakhraee =

Iranian neonatologist and pediatrician

Dr. Hossein Fakhraee (دکتر حسین فخرایی)
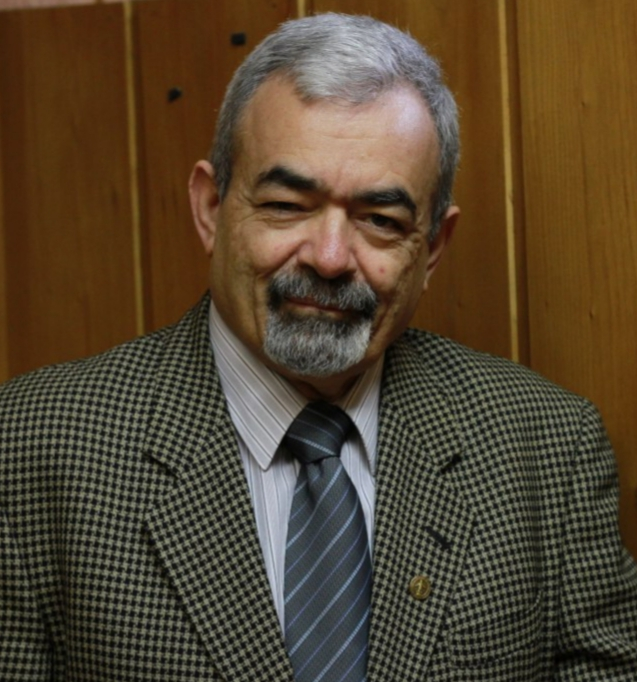
- Born: November 26, 1947 (age 78); Dezfoul, Iran
- Education: Shiraz University of Medical Sciences; Mayo Clinic; Scott & White Medical Center; Washington University in St. Louis
- Scientific career
- Fields: Pediatrics, Neonatology
- Workplaces: Shahid Beheshti University of Medical Sciences

Hossein Fakhraee (born November 26, 1947) is an Iranian neonatologist and pediatrician practicing in Tehran since 1980. He was a faculty member of Shahid Beheshti University of Medical Sciences until August 2017 upon his retirement as the university distinguished professor. He has been named as one of the few neonatologists who assisted in establishing modern neonatal medicine in Iran.

== Life and career ==
Fakhraee was born on November 26, 1947, in Dezfoul, a city in South West of Iran in the province of Khouzestan. He completed his elementary and high school education in his birth town in 1966 and then moved to Shiraz, Iran to pursue his career in medicine. He did his premedical and medical education in Shiraz University of Medical Sciences from 1966 to 1974. He then did a one-year pediatric residency in the same university. He moved to the United States in 1975 to complete his residency and fellowship. He continued his residency in pediatrics at Mayo Clinic in Rochester, MN and Scott and White Clinic in Temple, TX from 1975 to 1978. His fellowship in neonatology was done at Washington University School of Medicine, from 1978 to 1980. He became American board certified in pediatrics in 1979. After returning to his home country he has held numerous academic positions and has been involved in teaching, clinical and research activities. He has published many papers in the field of neonatology in Persian and English medical journals. His last position was the director of neonatology at Mofid Children's Hospital a tertiary pediatric teaching center, one of the largest and busiest in the nation.

== Positions held ==
- Director of Neonatology, Mofid Children's Hospital Shahid Beheshti University of Medical Sciences, 1980-2017
- Faculty member and director of Iranian Board of Neonatology, 1997-2017
- Faculty member, Iranian Board of Pediatrics, 2000-2010
- Consultant: Iranian Medical Council, 1987–present
- Consultants: Iranian Legal Medicine Organization, 1987–present

== Awards ==
- Iranian Nobles
- Best physician award of Iranian Medical Council
- Best faculty member award of Shahid Beheshti University of Medical Sciences in two occasions

== Memberships ==
- Senior fellow of American Academy of Pediatrics
- Member of Board of Directors of Iranian Society of Neonatology
- Member of National Iranian Committee of Immunization
- Member of Board of Directors of Iranian Society of breast milk promotion
- Member of Board of Directors of Iranian Society of Pediatrics
- Member of Editorial Board of Iranian Journal of Neonatology
- Member of Mayo Alumni Association
- Member of Scott and White Alumni Association

== See also ==
- Shahid Beheshti University of Medical Sciences
- List of hospitals in Iran
