= Hussein Abdul-Raof =

Professor of linguistics and translation studies

Hussein Abdul-Raof is a professor of linguistics and translation studies at Taibah University in Saudi Arabia. His works focus on Arabic and Qur'anic linguistics and rhetoric, as well as Qur'anic studies and textual analysis of the Qur'an.

== Works ==
- Qur'anic Semantics: Corpus and Lexical Behavior, (2023)
- An Introduction to Arabic Translation: Translator Training and Translation Practice (2022)
- Stylistics: Arabic and English Rhetorical and Linguistic Analysis (2020)
- Text Linguistics of Qur'anic Discourse: An Analysis (2018)
- New Horizons in Qur'anic Linguistics: A Syntactic, Semantic and Stylistic Analysis (2017)
- Introduction to Linguistics: For Students of English as a Foreign Language (2014)
- Semantics: A Coursebook for Students of English as a Foreign Language (2014)
- Theological Approaches to Qur'anic Exegesis: A Practical Comparative-Contrastive Analysis (2012)
- Schools of Qur'anic Exegesis: Genesis and Development (2010)
- Arabic Rhetoric: A Pragmatic Analysis (2006)
- Consonance in the Qur'an (2005)
- Qur'anic Stylistics: A Linguistic Analysis (2004)
- Arabic stylistics (2001)
- Qur'an Translation: Discourse, Texture and Exegesis (2001)
- Subject, Theme and Agent in Modern Standard Arabic (1998)
