= Hussein Nahaba =

Iraqi writer, translator and poet

- حسين نهابة
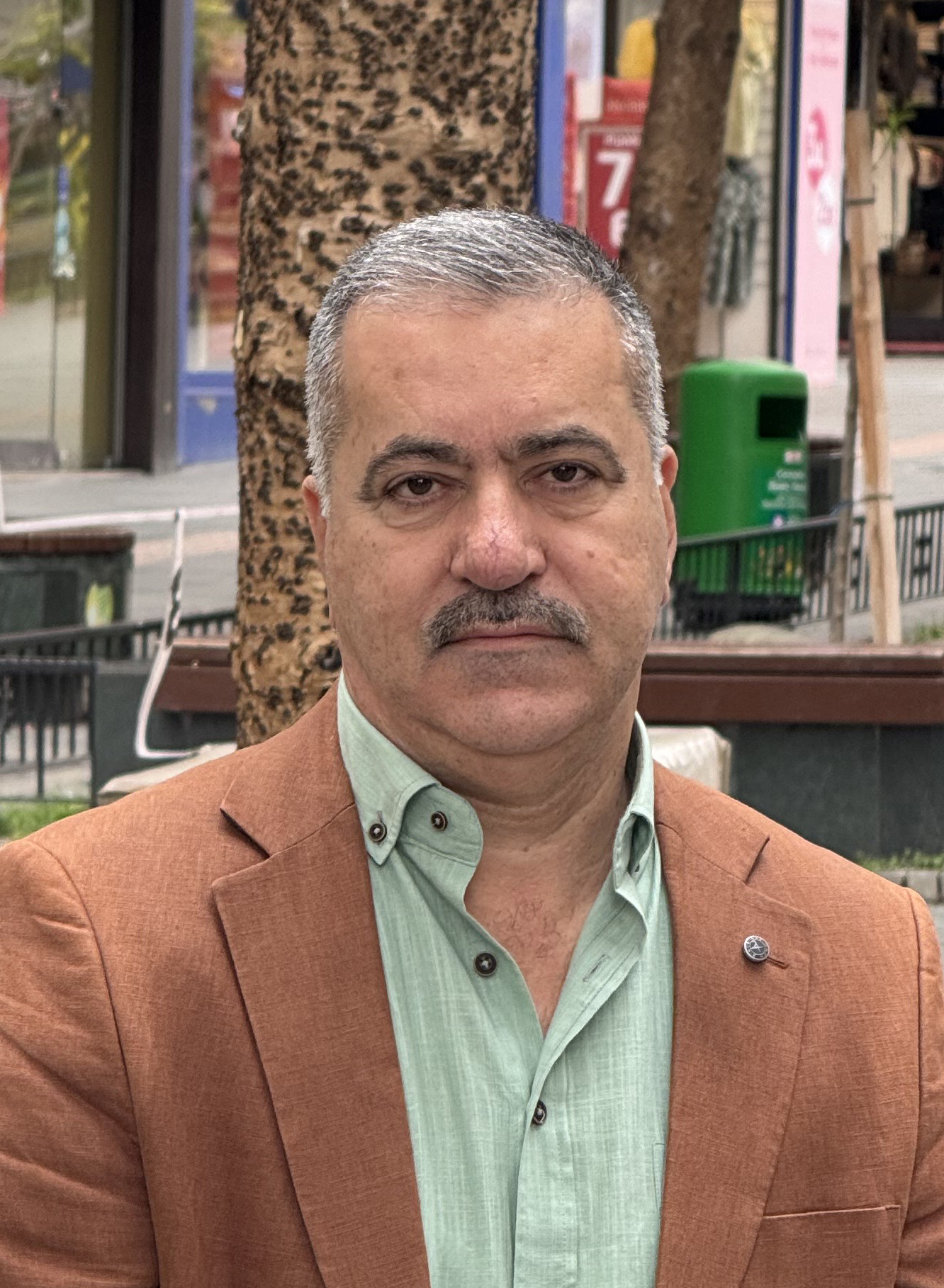
- Nahaba at the Baghdad International Book Fair in 2023
- Born: 1966 (age 58–59); Al-Hilla
- Known for: translator, writer

Hussein Nahaba (1966, Arabic: حسين نهابة) is an Iraqi translator, writer, poet, chairman of Ebjed Foundation for Translation, Publishing, and Distribution and film producer.

== Early life and education ==
Born in Al Hilla in 1966, where he studied primary and secondary education. He holds two bachelor's degrees in Spanish language from the University of Baghdad in 1988, and in English language from the University of Babylon in 2004, as well as a master's degree in Spanish language. He has 55 books, including 39 translated books. His first translated book was published by the Children's Culture House - Iraqi Ministry of Culture and Information in 1988 when he was in the fourth stage of collage. He has produced three films: the short film "Don't Tell Angelina Jolie" in 2018, the narrative documentary film "A Family in a Side Street" in 2019, and the documentary film "Mail Reader" in 2023.
