= Husain Sirhan =

Saudi Arabian poet

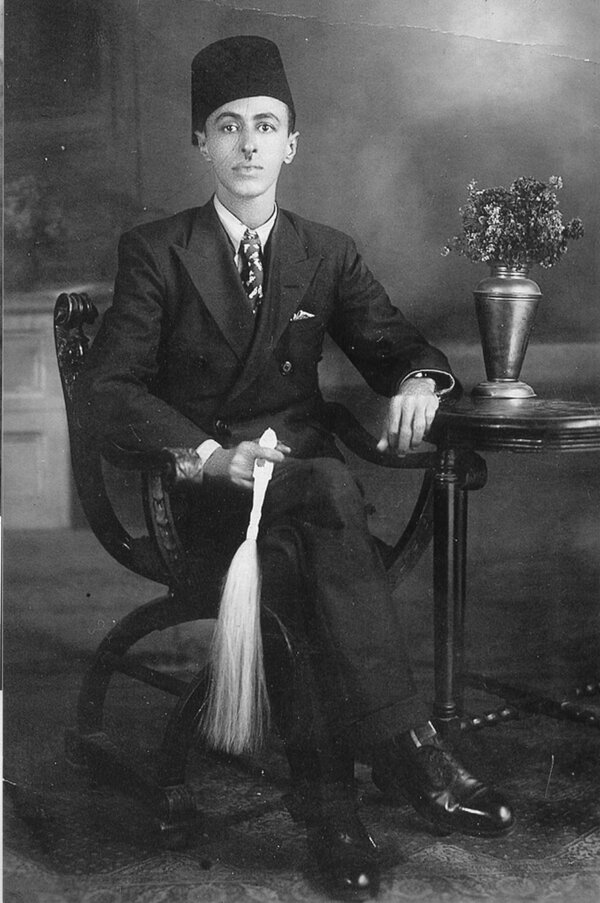
- Born: 1913/1916
- Died: 1993

Husain Sirhan (Arabic: حسين سرحان; 1913/1916 – 1993) was a Saudi Arabian poet. Born in Mecca, he had limited schooling and was largely self-taught. His writing was full of innovative ideas, and he was also exercised by the question of death. He became a recluse in later life. His poetry was translated into English and appeared in two anthologies of Arabian literature.
