= Hussein Muyonjo Swengere =

Ugandan politician and comedian

Hon. Hussein Muyonjo Swengere
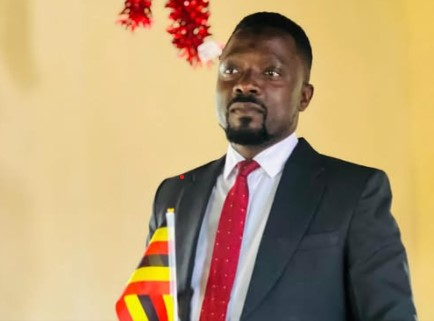

Member of Parliament for Jinja North Division
- Incumbent
- Assumed office 2026
- Preceded by: David Isabirye Aga
- Constituency: Jinja North Division

Personal details
- Born: Hussein Muyonjo
- Party: National Unity Platform
- Occupation: Politician, comedian, radio presenter

Hussein Muyonjo Swengere, commonly known as Swengere or Swengere Everywhere, is a Ugandan Politician , Comedian and radio personality. He was elected as the Member of Parliament for Jinja North Division in the 2026 Ugandan general election on the ticket of the National Unity Platform.

== Early life and education ==
Muyonjo was born on June 16, 1986 in Mafubira, Jinja district. He attended Mafubira Primary school from where he sat his primary leaving examinations (PLE), he joined Mpumudde High School and completed his O’ level.

== Media career ==
Muyonjo rose to prominence as a comedian and radio presenter based in Jinja. He worked as a presenter on Baba FM and became widely known in eastern Uganda for his comedy skits, which were circulated on social media platforms. Muyonjo has been widely known for promoting and championing the Lusoga language in his media and comedy work.

== Political career ==
Swengere entered elective politics ahead of the 2026 general elections as a candidate of the National Unity Platform (NUP). He secured the party nomination for Jinja North after the incumbent Member of Parliament, David Isabirye Aga, withdrew from the race and endorsed his candidacy.

In the 2026 general election, he won the Jinja North Division parliamentary seat, defeating multiple candidates to become Member of Parliament.

Following his election, Swengere stated that he intended to advocate for reforms to Uganda's copyright law in order to strengthen protections for artists and creatives and campion health care in his constituency.

Muyonjo was appointed Shadow Minister of Culture and Performing Arts in the 2026-2031 shadow cabinet.

== Personal life ==
Muyonjo has stated publicly that he intends to continue his involvement in comedy and entertainment alongside his parliamentary duties.
