= Husayn Khing Sawar =

Sayyid Hussain Khing Sawar or Hussain Khingsawar, also known as Meera Syed Hussain, was a Rizvi al-Taqvi Mashhadi Sayyid and a lineal descendant of the 8th Imam, Ali al-Ridha (A.S.), through the lineage of the 9th Imam, Muhammad al-Taqi (A.S). He came to India to spread peace. His family was from Mashhad, Iran. He came to India in 1174 A.D.
