= Hossein Khezri =

Iranian activist

Hossein Khezri (Persian حسین خضری) was an Iranian Kurdish activist who was sentenced to death by the Iranian Islamic Revolutionary Court in 2009. The charge against him was "waging war against God" due to his membership in the Party of Free Life of Kurdistan (PJAK). He was arrested in Kermanshah in 2008 and held at the Urmia prison.

Khezri was an unmarried atheist who had dropped out of school in the eighth grade to support his family. He worked at a carpet weaving store where unsanitary conditions led to him losing 70% of his eyesight.

He was executed on 15 January 2011, in Oroumieh, West Azarbaijan, Iran. Notably, his family and lawyer were not informed of his execution until after the sentence had been carried out.
