= Khorasan (newspaper) =

Iranian newspaper

- Owner(s): Khorasan Cultural and Artistic Institute
- Editor: Hossein Saeedi
- Founded: 1949; 77 years ago
- Language: Persian
- Headquarters: Mashhad, Iran
- Website: khorasanonline.ir

Khorasan (Persian: خراسان) is an Iranian newspaper headquartered in the city of Mashhad.

== History and management ==
Khorasan was established in its current form in 1949. Two short-lived newspapers with the same name were published in the early 20th century. After the 1979 Iranian Revolution, Khorasan's ownership changed between three different bonyads.

In 1991, Khorasan published an editorial criticizing Supreme Leader Ali Khamenei's policy changes following the death of his predecessor, Ruhollah Khomeini. Editor-in-chief Hojjatoleslam Abolfazl Mousavian was convicted for "insulting the Supreme Leader" and forced out of the newspaper. In the early 2000s, Khorasan's publishing license was transferred to the Khorasan Artistic and Cultural Institute, whose board members are appointed by the Supreme Leader. Khorasan has been described as operating under the Office of the Supreme Leader's supervision.

== Content ==
Khorasan is a national newspaper, though its main audience is in the eastern Razavi Khorasan, North Khorasan and South Khorasan provinces. The newspaper contains sections focusing on these provinces.

Before its takeover, Khorasan was considered reformist. It has since been associated with conservatism.

== Related publications ==
The Khorasan Cultural and Artistic Institute publishes several other newspapers, and runs the Akharin Khabar (akharinkhabar.ir) news website.
