= Hussein Hagi Bood =

Somali politician (died 2008)

Dr. Hussein Hagi Bood (Somali: Xuseen Xaaji Bood) was a Somali politician from the Abgaal clan. In December 2000, Hussein reached an agreement with the Transitional National Government. On the morning of December 21, 2008, Bood died in a hospital in Nairobi, Kenya. Bood has held different positions in previous Somali governments and was one of the Somalia's well-known politicians. He was survived only by his wife.
