= Hussain Ali Abbass Harba =

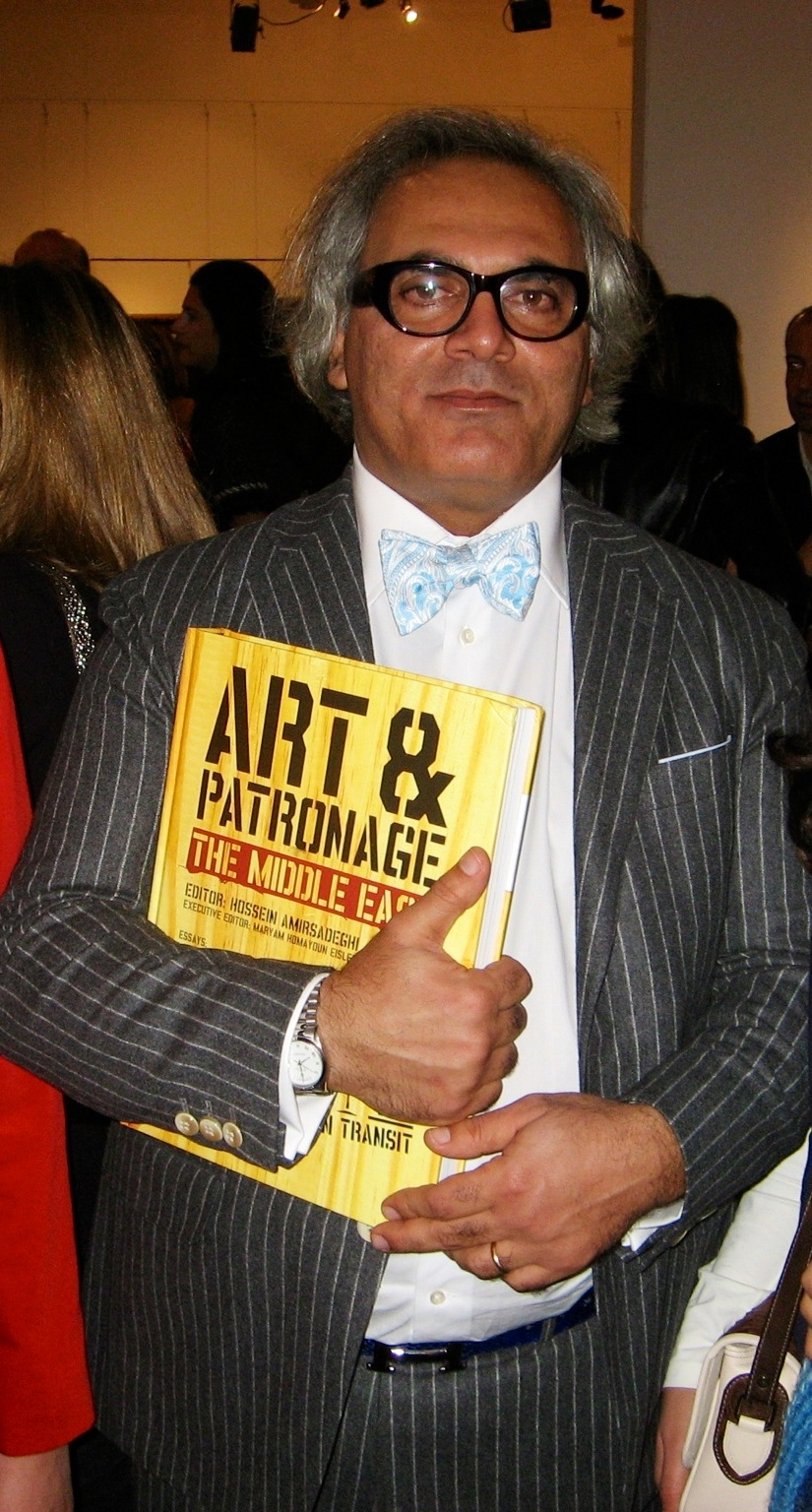
Hussain Harba

Hussain Harba born in Babylon in 1961, is an Iraqi Architect and Designer.

Was awarded a National prize "Italia che lavora. Third Millennium 2001". He founded in the nineties "La Triart Pubblicità", company located in Turin, that designs and produces design objects and forniture.

He also a fashion designer, owner of the brand Hussain Harba, which creates a wide range of luxury bags and jewels.

He has participated in several editions of the Milan and Turin Fashion Week.

Dr. Architect Hussain Harba, after getting a degree in Architecture at the Politecnico of Torino (Italy) in the eighties.

He works and lives in Turin, Italy.

Lover of art and the beauty.

Vogue, Vanity Fair and other magazines dedicated a few pages to his brand.

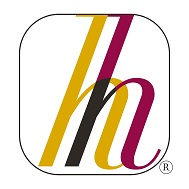
Hussain Harba Official Logo
