= Hussain Chandio =

Pakistani artist

Muhammad Hussain Chandio (Sindhi محمد حسين چانڊيو) is a Pakistani artist.

Chandio was born in 1974 in Dadu district of Sindh. He obtained his master's degree in Fine Arts from Sindh University Jamshoro. He worked as a lecturer at Centre of Excellence in Arts and Design, Mehran University of Engineering & Technology, Jamshoro. Chandio owns his own studio in Hyderabad.

== Exhibitions ==
=== Solo exhibitions ===
- 2015 - solo show, Gallery 6, Islamabad
- 2010 - solo show, Sindh Museum, Hyderabad
- 2009 - solo show, Majmua Gallery, Karachi
- 2003 - solo show, Heaven House School, Thatta

==== Group exhibitions ====
- 2011 - group show, international show in Islamabad
- 2011 - group show, Jharokha Gallery, Islamabad
- 2010 - group show, Institute of Arts & Design, University of Sindh, Jamshoro
- 2009 - group show, Institute of Arts & Design, University of Sindh, Jamshoro
- 2009 - group show, Kunj Art Gallery, Karachi
- 2008 - international exhibition, University of Sindh, Jamshoro
- 2006 - Mehran Colors group show, Art Council, Hyderabad
- Group show, Hyderabad, Karachi, Islamabad
