= Hossein Maher =

Iranian artist

- محمدحسین ماهر
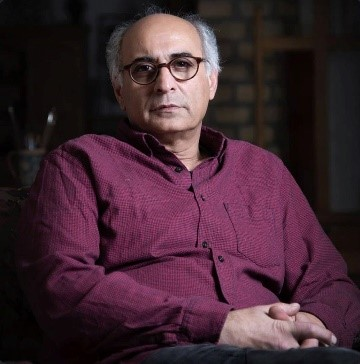
- Born: MohammadHossein Maher; December 20, 1957 (age 67); Abadan, Iran
- Education: Tehran University of Art (Faculty of Decorative Arts)
- Occupations: Painter; Sculptor
- Children: 2, Ahoo & Aftab
- Website: hossein-maher.com

Mohammad Hossein Maher (Persian: محمدحسین ماهر; b. 1957 in Abadan) is a contemporary Iranian painter and sculptor and graduated from the Faculty of Decorative Arts in Tehran and continued his education in France, then returned to Iran. He is one of the well-known figures and has been teaching painting to students for years and had a major impact on new generation of artists in Iran. Maher's fame first arose from his reference to the south of Iran. Throughout 1990s and 2000s, he was known as the "painter of the southern Iran".

His painting in those years was initially a kind of return to his hometown, but concept of his works turned into myth in 1990s and by moving away from the objective time and place, they became generalizable figures. From that time until today, the situation of human, time and place in Maher's works has changed many times, but what remains is the generalization of figures.

In the last two decades, his focus gradually turned inward and secluded, and instead of the climate and the land, he changed his direction to the mental world and fantasy climates.

His artworks participated in many single and group exhibitions in Tehran University of Art, Tehran Museum of Contemporary Arts exhibitions and biennials, Seyhoun gallery (Oldest active art gallery in Iran), and many exhibitions inside and outside Iran (Germany, Swiss, US, etc.).
