= Hussain Ayed =

Emirati footballer (born 1989)

Personal information
- Full name: Hussain Mubarak Ayed
- Date of birth: October 24, 1989 (age 37)
- Place of birth: Sharjah, UAE
- Height: 1.80 m (5 ft 11 in)
- Positions: Defensive midfielder; full back

Senior career*
Years	Team	Apps	(Gls)
2010–2011	Al-Wasl FC		

International career^{‡}
2008–	Iraq	3	(0)
- * Club domestic league appearances and goals as of June 24, 2011 ‡ National team caps and goals as of 24 June 2011

Hussain Ayed (Arabic: حسين عايد; born 24 October 1989) is a UAE born Iraqi footballer currently playing for AlWasl FC in Dubai. Ayed plays as a defensive central midfielder and full back. He began his career in London, England playing at district and county levels. Plymouth Argyle F.C. was the first club to offer a formal contact with Ayed, at age 16 however no deal materialised. Four years later Argyle manager Paul Mariner renewed interest in the young midfielder inviting him to pre-season for the 2010–2011 season before his contract was terminated. Ayed also played non-league football with Waltham Forest F.C. and Leyton F.C., respectively.

Ayed's route to UAE football was through previous AL Shabab Al Arabi and UAE national team player, manager and legend Abdulla Saqer.

Ayed made his U21 international debut in the summer of 2008 with the Iraq national football team for the Norway - Middle East U21 National Team Tournament held in Jordan, playing in all three matches against Jordan, Norway and Syria. Iraq won the tournament. Ayed was called up to play in a friendly against India in 2010 but could not attend the camp due to a health mishap. He has, nonetheless, been tipped by many Iraqi national coaches, including Adnan Hamad to take a firm position in the squad.

In March 2013 Hussain was recalled to the Iraq national football team training camp in Baghdad for their 2014 FIFA World Cup Qualification.
