= Hussain Mahmoudi =

Iranian cyclist

Hossein Mahmoudi
Personal information
- Full name: Hossein Mahmoudi Shahvar
- Born: 15 May 1962 (age 64) Tabriz, Iran

Cycling career
- Sport: Cycling

Hossein Mahmoudi (Persian: حسین محمودی, born 15 May 1962) is an Iranian former cyclist. He competed in two events at the 1992 Summer Olympics.
