= Hussain Lawai =

Pakistan banker (born 1945)

- Born: 1945 (age 80–81)
- Education: Institute of Business Administration, Karachi (MBA)
- Occupation: Banker
- Employer(s): Summit Bank; MCB Bank
- Known for: Former CEO of Summit Bank and MCB Bank and chairman of the Pakistan Stock Exchange

Hussain Lawai (born 1945) is a Pakistani former banker who served as the chief executive officer (CEO) of Summit Bank from 2008 to 2016. Previously, he served as the CEO MCB Bank from 1991 to 1996. He also served as the chairman of the Pakistan Stock Exchange.

== Early life and education ==
Hussain Lawai was born in 1945. He obtained an MBA from the Institute of Business Administration, Karachi in 1967.

== Career ==
=== Early banking career ===
Lawai began his career at MCB Bank, advancing within corporate banking. In the 1980s, Lawai led Emirates NBD in Pakistan and East Asia and later established Faysal Bank's branches in Pakistan in 1987 while serving as its CEO.

=== 1991–1996: MCB Bank ===
In January 1991, MCB Bank was privatized through an auction won by a consortium of twelve industrialists. At the time, Lawai was the CEO of Faysal Bank and acted as an advisor to the consortium. Following the privatization, he was appointed CEO of MCB Bank.

During his tenure, the Pakistani banking sector was undergoing privatization while still experiencing political interference. Lawai developed relationships with political figures, including Asif Ali Zardari. In October 1996, after the removal of the second Benazir Bhutto government, the government investigated corruption allegations against several officials, including Zardari. Lawai was accused by the governments of Pakistan and the United Arab Emirates of allowing MCB Bank to be used for money laundering to the UAE, allegations that were never substantiated.

=== 1996–2008: Exile ===
A UAE court cleared him of these charges in 2002. Despite his exoneration, the accusations led to his dismissal from MCB Bank and his subsequent exile to the UAE and London. After twelve years abroad, Lawai was acquitted of all money laundering charges in Pakistan in 2008.

=== 2008–2016: Summit Bank ===
In October 2008, Lawai acquired Arif Habib Bank with funding from Lootah family of the UAE, completing the transaction in July 2009. He subsequently acquired Mybank in October 2009 and Atlas Bank in November 2009, with the final merger completed on June 30, 2011. The consolidated entity was renamed Summit Bank. During his tenure as CEO, Lawai relocated 47 of the bank's 160 branches within the first two years and added 26 new branches, increasing the total to 186. He later limited further expansion, adding only seven additional branches. On the liability side, Summit Bank had minimal retail deposits and relied heavily on high-cost corporate deposits, resulting in a deposit cost of 14.5% in 2009—the highest in the industry. To address this, Lawai extended branch hours, introducing co-branded and prepaid debit cards, and focusing on remittances.

Summit Bank achieved profitability in 2014 and 2015. Lawai retired in 2016.

=== 2016–present: Post retirement ===
In May 2018, Lawai was elected as the chairman of the Pakistan Stock Exchange. In July 2018, Lawai was placed on the Exit Control List on the request of the Supreme Court of Pakistan.
