= Hossein Najmabadi =

Iranian scientist

Hossein Najmabadi is an Iranian medical scientist and the director of Genetics Research Center at University of Social Welfare and Rehabilitation Sciences (USWR). Najmabadi is known for his significant contribution to the genetics of mental retardation.

Najmabadi studied biology at the University of North Texas and hold a PhD in molecular biology from the same university in 1989. He then joined UCLA as a postdoc and in 1995 he was appointed as a faculty member at Charles Drew University of Medicine & Science - UCLA.

== See also ==
- Science in Iran
