= Hussain Darwish =

Syrian poet and journalist

- Occupations: Poet, journalist
- Notable work: Pillows of the Night

Hussain Darwish is a Syrian poet and journalist residing in Dubai. He writes for several newspapers, including "Al-Ayyam Syria" and the Emirati "Al-Bayan" where he writes a weekly column titled "Prior". Currently, he heads the Department of Culture in "Al-Bayan".

Additionally, Hussain was the manager of the first Al Owais Cultural Award festival which was held by the Al-Owais Cultural Foundation in Dubai in 2020.

A group of his poems were translated into French and later published by the Sharjah Book Authority in a book entitled "Pillows of the Night". This collection was also issued as part of the Paris International Book Fair in 2018.

== Works ==
Hussain Darwish published several poetry collections, including:

- Pre-War... Post-War (original title: Qabl al-Harb... B’ad al-Harb): Published in London in 1992 and won the Youssef Al-Khal Prize for Poetry, which was awarded by the “Literary Critic” magazine
- The Family's Treasury.. A Biography of the Walls (original title: Khizanat al-A’hl... Sirat al-Judran): Issued in Amman in 2000 by Riad El-Rayyes House for Books and Publishing
- The Garden of Strangers (original title: Hadiqat al-Ghoraba’): Published by Riad El-Rayyes for Books and Publishing in Beirut in 2003
- Layl's Birthmark (original title: Shamat Lail): Published by Riad El-Rayyes Books and Publishing House in Beirut in 2007
