= Hussain Fariyaaz =

Maldivian journalist

Personal details
- Born: 5 March 1983 (age 43) Malé, Maldives
- Profession: Journalist

Hussain Fariyaaz (Dhivehi: ހުސެން ފަރިޔާޒް) is a Maldivian journalist and the recipient of the presidential award for Journalism in 2019 with citation for his contribution for development of sports journalism in the Maldives.

== Career ==
Fariyaaz started his career as a reporter in one of oldest printed news outlets in the Maldives, and later served as the editor of Aafathis. He joined the Vmedia group in 2009 as head of the sports department in VTV. He was the national correspondent for all the major international sports events participated by Maldives including the 2008, 2011, 2013, 2014 SAFF Championship & AFC Challenge Cup. He was appointed as the news director of Raajje TV on 1 January 2020.

== Achievements ==
The best media coverage & news reporting 2007.

National Cricket Board's best media journalist 2014.
