= Hüseyin Çavuş Kelle =

Northern Cyprus's Minister of Agriculture and Natural Resources
- Incumbent
- Assumed office 11 August 2023

Personal details
- Born: 25 July 1979 (age 46) Famagusta, Northern Cyprus

Hüseyin Çavuş Kelle (born 25 July 1979) is a Turkish Cypriot farmer and politician.

== Early life and education ==
Hüseyin Çavuş was born on 25 July 1979, in Famagusta, as the son of a farming family. After completing his secondary and high school education at İskele Bekir Paşa High School, he pursued higher education at Eastern Mediterranean University, where he studied Tourism and Hotel Management.
