= Hossein Emamian =

Iranian footballer

Personal information
- Full name: Hossein Emamian
- Date of birth: 1977 (age 48–49)
- Place of birth: Iran
- Position: Winger

Team information
- Current team: Rah Ahan

Youth career
- 2008: Naft Tehran

Senior career*
Years	Team	Apps	(Gls)
2009–2014	Naft Tehran	88	(5)
2014–2016	Nassaji	31	(5)
2016–2017	Gol Gohar Sirjan	12	(9)
2017–2018	Rah Ahan	6	(6)
2018	Havadar S.C.	48	(8)
- * Club domestic league appearances and goals as of 10 September 2010 (UTC) ‡ National team caps and goals as of August 16, 2010

Hossein Emamian is an Iranian footballer.

== Club career ==
Emamian has played with Naft Tehran since 2009.

=== Club career statistics ===
Club performance			League		Cup		Continental		Total	
Season	Club	League	Apps	Goals	Apps	Goals	Apps	Goals	Apps	Goals
Iran			League		Hazfi Cup		Asia		Total	
2009–10	Naft Tehran	Division 1	23	0		0	-	-		0
2010–11	Naft Tehran	Pro League	26	2	1	0	-	-	27	2
2011–12	Naft Tehran	Pro League	9	1	1	0	-	-	10	1
Career total			58	3		0	0	0		1

- Assists

Season	Team	Assists
2010–11	Naft Tehran	0
