= Hussein Mohamed Sheikh =

Hussein Mohamud Sheikh Hussein

Minister of Agriculture of Somalia
- Incumbent
- Assumed office 12 January 2015
- Prime Minister: Omar Abdirashid Ali Sharmarke

Personal details
- Born: Somalia
- Party: Independent

Hussein Mohamud Sheikh Hussein is a Somali politician. He is the Minister of Agriculture of Somalia, having been appointed to the position on 12 January 2015 by Prime Minister Omar Abdirashid Ali Sharmarke.
