= Hussein Khaliqi =

Hussein Khaliqi or Huseyn Xelîqî or Hossein Khalighi or Ḥusayn Khalīqī, is a contemporary Kurdish writer. He was born in Iranian Kurdistan. He studied philosophy, history and sociology in University of Tabriz. He is currently the head of the Kurdish Institute of Stockholm.

== Works ==
=== Books ===
1. Bingehên giştî yên komelnasî or Binaxe giştîyekanî komełnasî (The foundations of Sociology), 447 pp., Apec Publishers, Spånga, Sweden, 1991. ISBN 91-87730-23-5
2. Dastanî mafî mirov or Dāstān-i māf-i mirǒf (The story of human rights), 208 pp., Stockholm, 1995. ISBN 91-7328-999-X
3. Mêjûy sedekenî nêwerast (The history of the Middle Ages), translation of a work from Russian by G.M. Dinskuy-u and A.U. Agibalu, 357 pp., Arzan Publishers, Jönköping, Sweden, 1995. ISBN 91-972224-9-6
4. Binaxekanî rêbazî şorişgerî : bizûtnewey rizgarîxwazî nîştimanî Felestîn (The foundations of revolutionary method: the national liberation movement of Palestine), 195 pp., Arzan Publishers, Jönköping, Sweden, 1996. ISBN 91-88880-07-9
5. Jan û Jiyan (Pain and Life), 321 pp., Rabûn Publishers, Uppsala, Sweden, 1998. ISBN 91-973354-0-1
