= Lezate Football =

Iranian television program for broadcasting European football

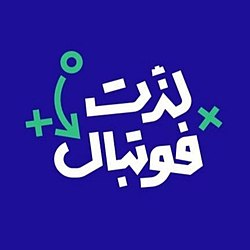
- Genre: Football
- Created by: Pouria Malekabadi
- Presented by: Rasoul Majidi; Nima Delavari
- Voices of: Mohammad Reza Ahmadi; Javad Khiabani; Peyman Yousefi; Alireza Alifar; Farshad Mohammadi Maram; Mohammad Sianaki; Alireza Dehghani; Payam Basiji; Reza Mohammad Ali; Mohsen Abofazeli; Nima Tajik; Saeid Zolfii; Reza Jafari; Meysam Mohammadzadeh; Reza Mohammadai; Shahab Vahabi
- Country of origin: Iran
- Original language: Persian
- No. of seasons: 6

Production
- Producer: Pouria Malekabadi
- Camera setup: 16:9
- Running time: 150–180 minutes (for each match)
- Production company: IRIB Varzesh

Original release
- Network: IRIB Varzesh
- Release: 22 December 2018 – present

Lezate Football (Persian: لذت فوتبال, transl. Football Pleasure) is an Iranian live television program that broadcasts, analyzes and reviews European football on IRIB Varzesh. Lezate Football program, performed by Rasoul Majidi and Nima Delavari produced by Pouria Malekabadi, aims to improve the football information of its audience and also to create entertainment, in addition to live broadcast of football matches, broadcast news, sidelines and press conferences of these matches. The first episode of this program went on the air on 22 December 2018.

Reviewing world sports newspapers, broadcasting press conferences of coaches and players, communicating with the fan clubs of European clubs operating in the country, communicating with foreign experts and players, conveys a familiar name, feeling and mood to the viewers of Lezate Football program. In a poll conducted by IRIB in August 2019, Lezate Football became the second most watched program on IRIB Varzesh with 12.5% of viewers. Considering that the sample population of this poll is large and it has been held in 33 cities, it can be said that out of the 80 million population of Iran, 10 million people watched Lezate Football.

== Background ==
Lezate Football program went on the air on 22 December 2018 and has been broadcast in 6 seasons so far.

== Attributes ==
=== Broadcast ===
Lezate Football broadcast on IRIB Varzesh every day, 1 hour to 30 minutes before the start of football matches until late at night.

=== Performance ===
This program is performed by Rasoul Majidi and Nima Delavari.

== Theme ==
=== Program process ===
In addition to live broadcast of European football with the performance of Rasoul Majidi and Nima Delavari Lezate Football program analyzes and examines these competitions with the presence of the best experts.

=== Program sections ===
- Review of world sports newspapers:

In this section, the headlines and news of world sports newspapers are examined.

- Broadcasting news conferences of coaches and players:

In each episode, news conferences of the matches that are to be aired on Lezate Football antenna are broadcast with subtitles.

- Communicating with the support clubs of European clubs active in the country:

Usually for special matches, the fan club of the two competing teams is contacted.

- Communication with foreign experts and players:

In some episodes, Lezate Football communicates with famous foreign experts and players.

- Guest:

In each episode of the program, experts, commentators, coaches and players are invited to the program and talk about the match with the presenters.

- Items:

In this section, items from teams, players and coaches of European leagues are broadcast.

- Pre-match:

In this section, a review of the conditions of the teams organizing the match in the previous weeks, a statistical review with a historical perspective is done.

== List of competitions ==
| Country | Competition name |
|---|---|
| England | Premier League FA Cup EFL Cup FA Community Shield |
| Spain | La Liga Copa del Ray Supercopa de España |
| Germany | Bundesliga DFB-Pokal DFL-Supercup Bundesliga 2 |
| Italy | Seria A Coppa Italia Supercoppa Italiana |
| France | Ligue 1 |
| Europe | UEFA Champions League UEFA Europa League UEFA Europa Conference League UEFA European Championship qualifying UEFA Nations League UEFA Super Cup |
| World | FIFA World Cup qualification Exhibition game International Champions Cup |

== Season information ==
| Season | Broadcast day and time | The beginning of the season | The end of the season | Year of broadcast | TV channel |
|---|---|---|---|---|---|
| 1 | Every day, 1 hour before the start of the matches | 22 December 2018 | 19 July 2019 | 2018–2019 | IRIB Varzesh |
| 2 | Saturday, Sunday and the nights of UEFA Champions League, 1 hour before the start of the matches | 2 November 2019 | 17 August 2020 | 2019–2020 | IRIB Varzesh |
| 3 | Saturday, Sunday and the nights of UEFA Champions League, 1 hour before the start of the matches | 5 September 2020 | 3 January 2021 | 2020–2021 | IRIB Varzesh |
| 4 | Every day, 1 hour before the start of the matches | 13 February 2021 | 23 May 2021 | 2021-2021 | IRIB Varzesh |
| 5 | Every day, 1 hour to 30 minutes before the start of the matches | 14 August 2021 | 29 June 2022 | 2021-2022 | IRIB Varzesh |
| 6 | Saturday, Sunday and the nights of UEFA Champions League, 1 hour to 30 minutes before the start of the matches | 13 August 2022 | 4 June 2023 | 2022-2023 | IRIB Varzesh |

== See also ==
- IRIB Varzesh
- Gozareshe Varzeshi
- Football 120
