= Yek Jahan Yek Jam =

Iranian live television program

- Genre: 2010 FIFA World Cup
- Created by: Hossein Zokaei
- Presented by: Reza Javdani; Mohammad Reza Ahmadi
- Country of origin: Iran
- Original language: Persian

Production
- Producer: Hossein Zokaei
- Camera setup: 16:9
- Production company: IRIB TV3 Sports Group

Original release
- Network: IRIB TV3
- Release: 10 June – 11 July 2010

Related
- Jame Hejdahom; Bist Chahardah

Yek Jahan Yek Jam (Persian: یک جهان یک جام, transl. A World A Cup) was a live television program covering the 2010 FIFA World Cup in South Africa. The program was produced by Hossein Zokaei and hosted by Reza Javdani and Mohammad Reza Ahmadi. It was the most watched Iran media program for the 2010 FIFA World Cup. Yek Jahan Yek Jam started on 10 June 2010 and ended on 11 July 2010 with the end of the 2010 FIFA World Cup.

The program covered topics such as World Cup news, technical expertise of matches, introduction of countries, margins of matches and live broadcast of matches.

One of the key guests of the program was Afshin Ghotbi, the then head coach of the Iranian national football team, who appeared on the program on 5 July 2010 after returning from South Africa.

During the broadcast of the program, criticisms were leveled at the design, execution, poor decor, repetitive guests, and not-so-extraordinary experts of the program. Amir Haj Rezaei, Morteza Mohasses and Houshang Nasirzadeh were the main experts of this program.

According to media reports, more than 80 million text messages were sent to this program during the cup.

== Background ==
Yek Jahan Yek Jam program was founded in 2010 by Hossein Zokaei to cover the 2010 FIFA World Cup. The first episode of Yek Jahan Yek Jam was broadcast on 10 June 2010. 11 July 2010 was the last episode of this program.

== Attributes ==
=== Broadcast ===
Yek Jahan Yek Jam went on the air every day for 1 month.

=== Performance ===
The hosts of this program were Reza Javdani and Mohammad Reza Ahmadi.

== Theme ==
=== Program process ===
Yek Jahan Yek Jam program broadcast, covered, reviewed and analyzed the 2010 FIFA World Cup and related events on a daily basis. Typically, the program covered the 2010 FIFA World Cup matches, covered the news, and analyzed match-related issues with experts and reviewed the margins of the 2010 World Cup.

=== Program sections ===
- Broadcast matches:

The program broadcast the 2010 World Cup matches.

- Expert:

In each program, an expert commented on the matches.

- Items:

Every day in this section, items from the teams, players and coaches of the World Cup and related issues were broadcast.

- Guest:

In each part of the program, coaches and players were invited to the program and talked to the host about various issues.

- World Cup news:

A summary of the most important news related to the 2010 World Cup was broadcast in this section. The presenter of this section was Mohammad Reza Ahmadi.

- Technical analysis:

In this section, the World Cup matches (technically or qualitatively) were analyzed by a multiplayer team and the result was broadcast with pictures related to the match.

- Pre-match:

In this section, the conditions of the teams organizing the match in the previous matches were examined, and a statistical review was performed along with a historical perspective.

== See also ==
- Mohammad Reza Ahmadi
- Bist Chahardah
- Bist Hejdah
