= Boom! (Israeli game show) =

Game show format

- Genre: Game show
- Created by: Ido Rosenblum
- Presented by: Ido Rosenblum
- Country of origin: Israel
- No. of seasons: 1

Production
- Running time: 45 minutes

Original release
- Network: Channel 2
- Release: 3 April – 16 June 2014

Related
- ¡Boom!, Boom! (US)

Boom! is an Israeli game show, broadcast from 3 April to 16 June 2014. The show was produced by the Keshet Media Group and broadcast on Channel 2. It was created and hosted by Ido Rosenblum. The format was sold to numerous countries.

== Format ==
The gameplay mechanic for the show is to defuse bombs by cutting coloured wires corresponding to correct answers. Cutting the wire for a wrong answer, or running out of time, leads to the bombs exploding by releasing compressed air to expel substances. In some international versions, foodstuffs are released, while in the Spanish version a non-staining polymer solution is used. While the use of the bombs is shared across all editions, the format of the programme differs from country to country, or within the broadcast run of one country's version.

== Reception ==
The show achieved an audience share of 41.2%, the highest for a game show in the country's history.

The bomb-centred focus of Boom! attracted scrutiny in Israel before the programme debuted. Yael Danieli, a trauma expert, said that the show could be part of exposure therapy, but ran the risk of trivialising bombing. Jessica Steinberg of The Times of Israel gave a positive review, but commented that the format of the show could be considered insensitive in the Middle East.

== International versions ==
Days after its debut, international channels secured the rights to make adaptations at the industry trade fair in Cannes; these included Fox in the United States, TF1 in France and Antena 3 in Spain.

Country	Title	Network	Host	Date aired
Argentina	¡Boom!	Telefe	Leandro "Chino" Leunis and Ivana Nadal	30 September 2015 – 6 January 2016
Brazil	Boom!	Record	Tom Cavalcante	8 March – 14 June 2026
Cambodia	Boom!	Bayon TV	Dith Sovannarith	5 March 2016 – 2017
Chile	¡Boom!	TVN	José Miguel Viñuela	9 March – 13 May 2015
Colombia	¡Boom!	Caracol Televisión	Mario Espitia	25 November 2017 – 19 January 2019
France	Boom : Gagner ne tient qu'à un fil !	TF1	Vincent Lagaf'	10 August – 4 September 2015
Greece	Boom!	Skai TV	Sakis Tanimanidis	16 September 2019 – 2020
Hungary	Bumm!	TV2	Claudia Liptai and Tibor Kasza; Attila Till	28 September – 28 November 2014; 21 November 2016 – 7 July 2017
Iran (unlicensed version)	Sime Akhar	IRIB TV3	Reza Rashidpour	5 November 2020 – 11 March 2022
Italy	Boom!	NOVE	Max Giusti	29 August 2016 – 3 May 2019
Kazakhstan	Boom!	TV7	Rinat Safargulov	15 September 2014 – 2015
Mexico	¡Boom!	Azteca Trece	Rykardo Hernández	8 August 2016 – 16 March 2017
Philippines	Boom! (part of Eat Bulaga!)	GMA Network	Vic Sotto; Joey de Leon, Allan K. (substitute hosts)	24 September 2018 – 6 July 2019
Portugal	Boom!	TVI	Marco Horácio	9 August – 11 September 2020
Serbia	Boom!	Blic TV	Ljubinka Klarić	5 October 2023 – 23 May 2024
Spain	¡Boom!	Antena 3	Juanra Bonet	9 September 2014 – 7 May 2023
Spain	¡Boom!	Cuatro	Christian Gálvez	9 September – 5 December 2024
Thailand	BOOM! Thailand	Channel 9	Willy McIntosh	4 February – 3 June 2017
United States	Boom!	Fox	Tom Papa	25 June – 10 September 2015
Vietnam	Quả cầu bí ẩn	VTV3	Ngô Kiến Huy; Minh Xù	3 March – 25 August 2019; 4 January – 26 December 2020
