= IRIB Varzesh =

Iranian sports TV channel

- Country: Iran
- Broadcast area: Asia and Guyana
- Network: Islamic Republic of Iran Broadcasting
- Headquarters: Tehran

Programming
- Language: Persian
- Picture format: 16:9 (576i, SDTV) 16:9 (1080p, HDTV)

Ownership
- Owner: IRIB

History
- Launched: 18 July 2012

Links
- Website: www.varzeshtv.ir

Availability

Terrestrial
- Jamaran: Ch43 UHF Digital

Streaming media
- IRIB Varzesh Live Streaming

IRIB Varzesh (Persian: شبکه ورزش, romanized: Shabekeh-ye Vahrzesh, lit. 'Sports Channel') is a national sports TV channel in Iran which was launched on 18 July 2012 and is the fifth Iranian television channel to broadcast in digital mode and the second one to broadcast in High definition quality. This channel is currently available using Set-top box devices and online.

This channel broadcasts some sports competitions held in Iran and the world. Broadcasting of channel programs in HD format and HEVC codec from terrestrial and satellite receivers began on 29 November 2020.

== History ==
After the implementation of the digital broadcasting system and the expansion of this system in Iran, the number of national channels increased. IRIB Varzesh was officially inaugurated on 18 July 2012 with the presence of Mahmoud Ahmadinejad, the then President of Iran.

IRIB Varzesh was placed on the third transmitter in the provinces on 31 July 2012.

The director of this channel is currently Sina Motazedi.

== Broadcast range ==
This channel is broadcast in most parts of Iran through digital transmitters on the Ultra high frequency band. The channel's programs are also broadcast via Badr 5 satellite in Asia, Europe and the Middle East. However, during the live broadcast of football, volleyball, basketball, handball, tennis and other sports matches, it is possible to watch it only through digital transmitters inside Iran, and due to non-observance of the right to broadcast matches, on satellite frequencies instead of live broadcasts of matches, Various sports, sports documentaries are broadcast. Receiving IRIB Varzesh programs is free. This channel is active 24 hours a day. The channel's programs are also broadcast for free through the Internet and the Telewebion website.

== Programs ==
Varzesh televises two Persian Gulf Pro League matches per week and occasionally televises important Azadegan League matches. The channel also shows Olympic and World Cup documentaries and educational sports videos.

Varzesh also airs several popular Iranian Wrestling shows, including: 120 Football which focuses on European Football, Meydan which focuses on Iranian sports and Lezate Football which mainly televises European and International football matches. Varzesh also other sports Volleyball tournament in the world and Iran.

=== Multi-sport event ===
- Summer Olympic Games
- Winter Olympic Games
- Summer Paralympic Games
- Winter Paralympic Games
- Asian Games
- Universiade
- Islamic Games
- European Games
- Youth Olympic
- World Games
- IIHF World Championship

=== Football ===
- FIFA World Cup
- FIFA World Cup qualification
- UEFA European Championship
- UEFA European Championship qualifying
- UEFA European Under-21 Championship
- Copa América
- AFC Asian Cup
- AFC U-23 Championship
- FIFA Club World Cup
- UEFA Champions League
- UEFA Europa League
- UEFA Super Cup
- AFC Champions League
- Premier League
- FA Cup
- FA Community Shield
- Laliga
- Copa del Rey
- Supercopa de España
- Bundesliga
- DFB-Pokal
- DFL-Supercup
- Serie A
- Supercoppa Italiana
- Ligue 1
- Trophée des Champions
- Campeonato Brasileiro Série A
- Iran Persian Gulf Pro League
- Iran Azadegan League
- Iran Hazfi Cup

=== Kabaddi ===
- Iran Junior World Championship
- Kabaddi Premier League

=== Volleyball ===
- FIVB World League
- FIVB World Championships
- PlusLiga
- CEV Champions League
- Italian Volleyball League
- Iranian Volleyball Super League
- Asian beach volleyball
- Avc cup (Asian volleyball championship)
- Avc cup U20, U18
- Asian volleyball club
- FIVB Club World Championship

=== Basketball ===
- NBA
- FIBA Basketball World Cup
- FIBA Asia Cup
- FIBA Asia Champions Cup
- WABA Championship
- Iranian Basketball Super League
- Euro League
- Euro Basket

=== Handball ===
- IHF World Men's Handball Championship
- Asian Men's Handball Championship
- EHF Champions League
- Iran Handball Pro League
- European handball championship
- Handball World Club (Global)

=== Futsal ===
- FIFA Futsal World Cup
- AFC Futsal Championship
- AFC Futsal Club Championship
- Iranian Futsal Super League
- European Futsal Championship

=== Wrestling ===
- Iranian Premier Wrestling League
- World champion wrestling
- World U23 wrestling
- World U20 wrestling
- World U17 wrestling

=== Formula racing ===
- Formula one

=== Motorcycle racing ===
- MotoGP
- Moto2
- Moto3

== Popular programs ==
- Football 120 (2013–2023)
- Shabhaye Footballi (2015–present)
- Nowruz-e Footballi (2016–present)
- Football 1 (2017–present)
- Videocheck (2018–present)
- Lezate Football (2018–present)
- VNL (2021–present)
- Kadr Fanni (2021–present)

== See also ==
- Islamic Republic of Iran Broadcasting
- List of sports television channels
