= Haft Khan (game show) =

Iranian television contest

- Genre: Game show
- Written by: Mohammad Hassan Raitpour Moghaddam
- Directed by: Saeed Rezayat
- Presented by: Mohammad Reza Golzar
- Composer: Theme Studio
- Country of origin: Iran
- Original language: Persian
- No. of seasons: 1

Production
- Producer: Mehdi Moniri
- Editor: Amir Samsami
- Running time: 60 minutes

Original release
- Network: Namava
- Release: 28 March 2021 – present

Haft Khan (Persian: هفت خان, transl. Seven Labours) is an Iranian contest based on public information performed by Mohammad Reza Golzar. This contest is broadcast weekly from Namava. The Haft Khan contest procedure is designed based on the answers to the questions in the announced branches and the general information level of the participants.

This contest is made in the style and context of the Barandeh Bash contest, which was completely removed from the conductor of IRIB TV3 on 25 April 2019, following criticism from several imitation authorities.

== Contest process ==
Initially, the executor provides 50 ingots equivalent to 100 million Tomans as capital to the participant. Participants save their ingots during the contest, and the contest ends when they lose their ingots due to incorrect answers. The participant has to go through all seven labours and each labour's questions are related to a branch of general information. If he succeeds and protects the remaining ingots, he will be rewarded with the equivalent. The categories are: history, sports, literature, art, and... if the participant reaches the fifth labour, he can keep his balance and leave the contest.

=== Step 1: earn enough points ===
Initially, those who are interested in participating in this contest enter their details, and after verifying the authenticity of the participant, the entrance exam begins. The participant must answer 20 questions in 10 minutes and finish the contest. At the end of the contest, the score will be announced to the participant.

=== Next level ===
After completing the initial test and in case of obtaining the necessary score to enter, the participant must wait for the coordination and public relations team of Haft Khan to contact him and make the necessary arrangements.

This is a two-person contest and those who pass the entrance exam are invited with them.

=== important points ===
- The participant has only 30 seconds for each question and will not be allowed to return to the previous question after each question has expired.
- Each person can only take the entrance test once.

== See also ==
- Rostam's Seven Labours
- Barandeh Bash
