= Adel Ferdosipour =

Iranian sports commentator and television producer

- عادل فردوسی‌پور
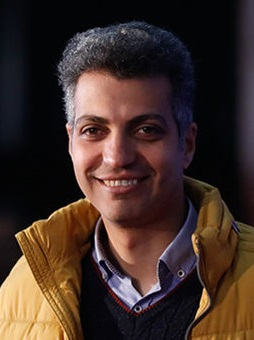
- Born: Adel Ferdosipour; 3 October 1974 (age 51); Rafsanjan, [Iran]
- Education: Sharif University of Technology; University of Tehran
- Occupation: Television sports commentator
- Employer(s): IRIB & Sharif University of Technology
- Height: 1.89 m (6 ft 2 in)

Adel Ferdosipour (Persian: عادل فردوسی‌پور; born 3 October 1974) is an Iranian journalist, football commentator, translator, university professor, and television show host and producer. He was the host and producer of the popular TV show Navad. He is a producer of the popular TV show Football 120 and supervisor of Football 360.

== Life ==
Ferdosipour was born on 3 October 1974 in Rafsanjan, Kerman province. Ferdosipour attended Zoghi Elementary School, before graduating to attend Alborz High School. He received his master's degree in industrial engineering from Sharif University of Technology. Adel is a close friend of Ali Daei as they both attended the same university. He is a member and the captain of the celebrities football team in Iran. Ferdosipour voted for Mir Hossein Mousavi in the 2009 Iranian presidential elections. On 8 January 2026, Ferdosipour publicly supported the 2025–2026 Iranian protests, stating: "I support their legitimate protest and condemn any violence and repression against the people's anger and legitimate demands."

== Performances ==
=== TV programs ===
| Year | Title | Job | Network |
|---|---|---|---|
| 1999–2019 | Navad | Presenter, Producer | IRIB TV3 |
| 2013–2023 | Football 120 | Producer, Narrator | IRIB Varzesh |
| 2014 | Bist Chahardah | Presenter, Producer | IRIB TV3 |
| 2018 | Bist Hejdah | Presenter, Producer | IRIB TV3 |
| 2018–2020 | UEFA Champions League magazine | Narrator | IRIB Varzesh |

=== Internet programs ===
| Year | Title | Job | Network |
|---|---|---|---|
| 2016 | Hattrick | Presenter, Producer | Aio Internet TV |
| 2019 | Clasico | Producer | Cafe Bazaar, Filimo, Namava |
| 2020–present | UEFA Champions League magazine | Narrator | Filimo (2020–2022), Football 360 (2022–present) |
| 2022–present | Football 360 | Producer, Presenter, Editor-in-chief | Football 360 website and application |

=== Film ===
| Year | Title | Job | Role | Director |
|---|---|---|---|---|
| 2017 | Farshad, The Top Scorer | Actor | Himself | Jaafar Sadeghi |

=== Theatre ===
| Year | Title | Role | Director |
|---|---|---|---|
| 2005 | Fenz | Narrator | Mohammad Rahmanian |

== Popularity ==
Adel Ferdosipour is considered to be one of the most popular public figures in Iran, due to his honesty, sincerity, his unique kind of reportage and even questioning and disagreeing with high authority officials. His program, which airs on Monday nights, has an audience of over 30 million (40 million has also been stated by some sources). Newsweek Magazine considered Ferdosipour among 20 powerful persons of Iran in 2009 because of his widespread popularity.

== See also ==
- List of Sharif University of Technology people
- Ali Daie
- Navad
