= Football-e Bartar =

Iranian association football TV program

- Genre: Iranian Football highlights and analysis
- Presented by: Current: Analytical: Mohammad Hossein Misaghi (2019–) Match broadcast: Mohammad Reza Ahmadi (2020–) Former: Match broadcast: Javad Khiabani (2001–2016); Mazdak Mirzaei (2016–2017); Mohammad Sianaki (2017); Peyman Yousefi (2017–2018); Mohammad Hossein Misaghi (2018–2020)
- Voices of: Mohammad Reza Ahmadi; Javad Khiabani; Peyman Yousefi; Alireza Alifar; Abbas Ghane; Mohammad Sianaki; Ehsan Khorasani; Reza Jafari; Mohammad Reza Hakimi; Erfan Karami; Shayan Moradinasab; Behnam Mehdizadeh
- Narrated by: Mohammad Hossein Misaghi; Hamed Rastgoo; Ehsan Khorasani; Erfan Karami; Mohammad Reza Hakimi; Shayan Moradinasab; Behnam Mehdizadeh
- Country of origin: Iran
- Original language: Persian
- No. of series: Match broadcast: 23; Analytical: 6

Production
- Producer: Mehdi Hashemi
- Production location: Studio 14, IRIB
- Camera setup: Multi-camera
- Running time: Match broadcast: 120–150 minutes Analytical: 160–200 minutes
- Production company: IRIB TV3 Sport

Original release
- Network: IRIB TV3
- Release: 2 November 2001 – present

Football Bartar (Persian: فوتبال برتر, meaning Premier Football) is an Iranian live football television program. It usually broadcasts on Esteghlal, Persepolis and the Iran national football team match day, 30 minutes before the start of the match. The analytical program airs every Monday night on IRIB TV3.

== Overview ==
Produced by Mehdi Hashemi and presented by Mohammad Hossein Misaghi, the program explores what is happening around Iran's football. The program usually covers the Persian Gulf Pro League matches, the Iranian Hazfi Cup, the Iranian Super Cup, the AFC Champions League matches and the Iran national football team matches.

Every episode typically feature three Referee Expert. they discuss the referee's decisions and errors. On some shows, famous football players are invited and interview as well. This television program replaces the Navad.

== History ==
Football Bartar was founded in 2001 by Mehdi Hashemi. The first episode of the program aired on 2 November 2001. Since 31 March 2019, Football Bartar analytical program has aired on the IRIB TV3.

The first episode of the analytical program was broadcast on 31 March 2019 for the 90th Tehran Derby special program.

== Attributes ==
Broadcast

The Football Bartar match broadcast program is usually broadcast on Esteghlal, Persepolis and the Iran national football team match day. The Football Bartar analytical program airs every Monday at approximately 22:30.

Presenter

The program is presented by Mohammad Hossein Misaghi. Javad Khiabani, Peyman Yousefi and Mazdak Mirzaei were former Football Bartar broadcast program presenter.
