= Football 360 =

Football Application and Media

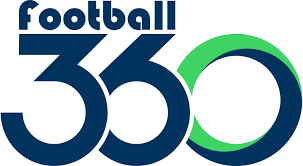
- Native name: فوتبال ۳۶۰
- Romanized name: Football 360
- Company type: Private company
- Website type: Sports journalism
- Available in: 1 languages
- List of languages Persian
- Country of origin: Iran
- Founder: Adel Ferdosipour
- Editor: Adel Ferdosipour
- Services: News website, mobile app, podcast, Internet television, social media
- Parent: Sharif Football Idea and Innovation Company
- Website: football360.ir
- Registration: No
- Current status: Active

Football 360 (Persian: فوتبال ۳۶۰) is a sports-related news and content creating media platform based in Iran. It is available in web-based version as well as android and iOS apps.

The platform was founded in early 2022 by Iranian media personality, Adel Ferdowsipour. The production team and content creating crew largely consists of that of Navad TV show, whose broadcast was previously canceled by Iranian state TV.

The Android application of Football360 was launched in May 2022. It was downloaded over 1.5 million times in the space of a few months.
