= El círculo de los famosos =

Spanish version of British gameshow The Wheel

El círculo de los famosos (literally "The Circle of Celebrities") is the Spanish version of the British game show The Wheel. Its first season was broadcast from 8 February to 29 March 2023 on Antena 3, presented by Juanra Bonet. The show was renewed for a second season in 2026, to be presented by Arturo Valls.

== History ==
The Wheel, presented by Michael McIntyre, premiered on BBC One in November 2020 and began to be adapted by different countries. El círculo de los famosos began filming in November 2022, as Juanra Bonet's first project since the cancellation of ¡Boom! weeks earlier.

The first episode aired on 8 February 2023 with a 16% audience share and 1,608,000 viewers; for primetime that night it was surpassed only by El Hormiguero on the same channel. Over the season, it averaged 11.8% of the audience, having peaked with its first episode and only fallen under 10% once in eight episodes.

== Format ==
Three contestants appear in each episode, with one playing at a time and staying on for as long as they answer questions correctly. Seven celebrities, each an expert in a subject, are span around on a mechanical wheel, and the one who it lands on helps the contestant with the question. The contestant who answers the last question of the night advances to the final.

Celebrity guests on the first episode were Adriana Abenia, Adriana Torrebejano, Antonio Resines, Boris Izaguirre, Lorena Castell, Lorenzo Caprile and Pepe Reina.
