= Reza Rashidpour =

Iranian television presenter, film producer, actor and film director

Reza Rashidpour رضا رشیدپور
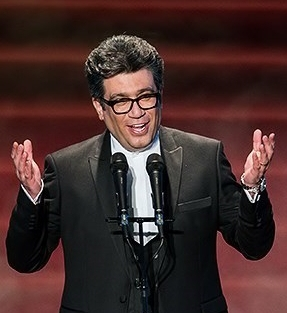
- Rashidpour at 36th Fajr Film Festival, February 2018
- Born: August 10, 1978 (age 47); Tabriz, Iran
- Education: Bachelor's degree in civil engineering and directing from the University of Tabriz
- Occupations: TV presenter, Producer, Director, Actor, Poet
- Years active: 1993–present
- Spouse: Naghmeh Mehrpak (m. 2003)
- Children: Helen
- Father: Akbar Rashidpour

Reza Rashidpour (Persian: رضا رشیدپور; born 10 August 1978 in Tabriz) is an Iranian TV presenter, film producer and director, actor, pilot, and poet.

== Personal life ==
Rashidpour was born on August 10, 1978. He has only one younger sister who is an architect. His mother was a housewife and his father was an electrical and electronics engineer, and when he was sent to Dezful to collect equipment for the Ashura Division, he had his spinal cord amputated while on duty and died in 1997. During his school years, he studied as a graduate in mathematics and physics with a grade point average of 19.86 and at the same time graduated from two universities in two fields of civil engineering and directing. And in recent years, he has been working as a lecturer in the news school.

== Artistic life ==
In addition to acting, Rashidpour also directs and constructs. He has starred in Superstar, Penniless, Six and Besh, Along the city and Domestic killer.

He has hosted several television programs on IRIB TV5, some of which have been banned.

In 2012, he made critical videos and posted them on Facebook or YouTube. On June 22, 2013, Mohammad Royanian, CEO of Persepolis, announced that Persepolis World Television, hosted by Reza Rashidpour, would be inaugurated. He is the director of the Tehran Multimedia Center.

His "Night Vision" program was released through the Aparat system. Night Vision was a talk-based program in which Rashidpour, by inviting celebrities, asked a challenging conversation about the important aspects of their lives. Mohammad Javad Zarif, Akbar Abdi, Shila Khodadad, Amir Tataloo, Hamid Rasaee, Shahram Jazayeri, Reza Kianian, Mostafa Kavakebian, Hossein Pakdel, Sadegh Kharazi, Sahar Ghoreishi, Bahareh Afshari, Sirvan Khosravi were among the guests of this program. Ali Akbar Javanfekr, Ahmadinejad's adviser, was also among the guests of the program, but the video of the program was not allowed to be released due to the opposition of the relevant authorities.

== Iranian Network ==
He was the host of the program "Good Night" on the Iranian satellite network. At the same time, news sites claimed that he intended to cause unrest by abusing the art of a 70-year-old artist and that he had been arrested, which was later denied.

== Attending Hassan Rouhani's election campaign ==
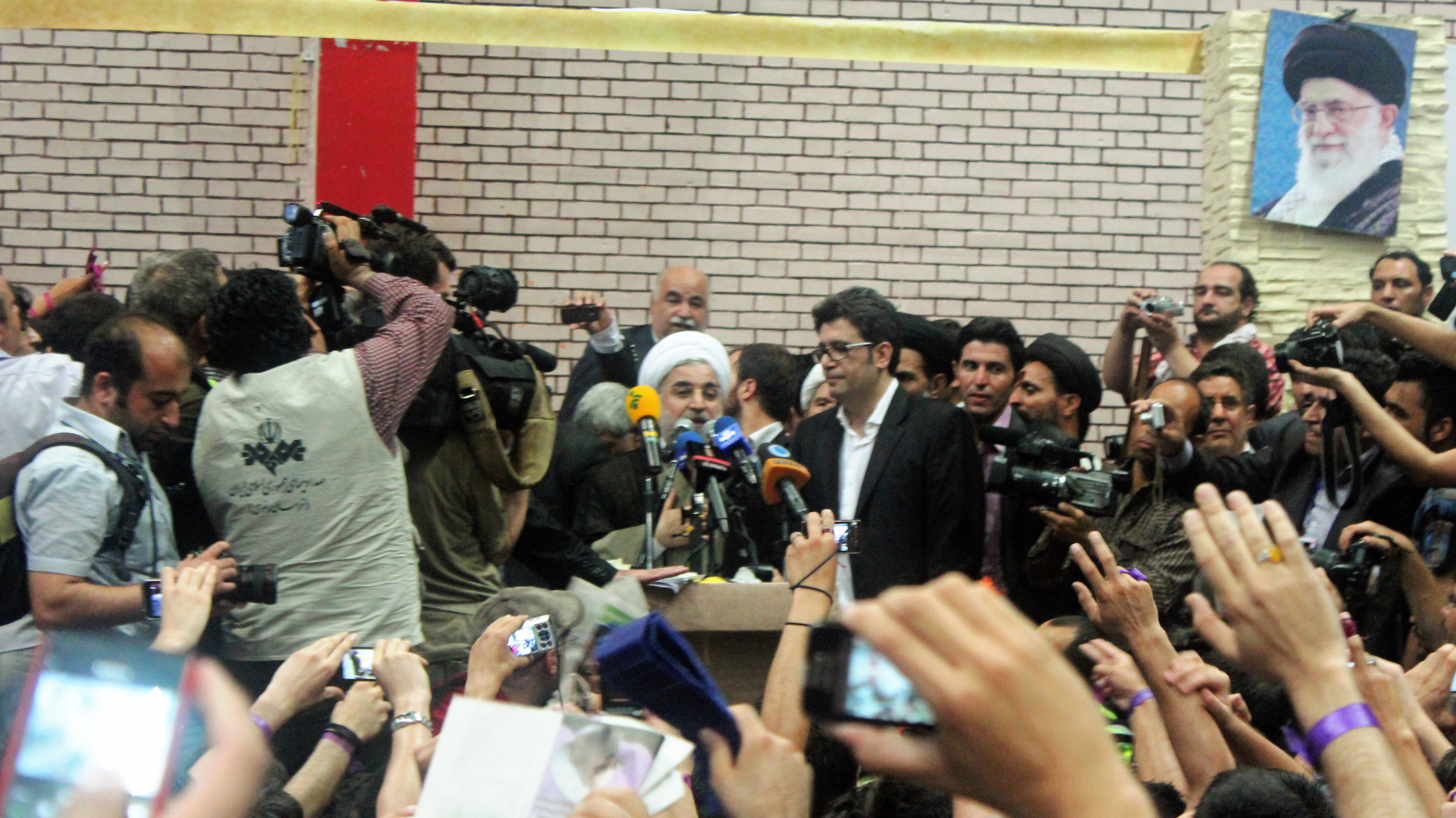
Reza Rashidpour during Hassan Rouhani's election trip to Mashhad on June 12, 2013

Until June 2013, he appeared less as a presenter in programs, until on June 8, 2013, he attended Hassan Rouhani's election conference and took over the program. More than 50,000 people attended the conference. Rashidpour also accompanied Hassan Rouhani during his trip to Mashhad and Isfahan and performed the ceremony.

== Presence in IRIB ==
On May 4, 2008, a program called "Glass Triangle" was performed by Rashidpour on the IRIB TV5. While the last 35 episodes of the Glass Triangle program was on the air, the program suddenly stopped broadcasting, at the same time the reason for this was considered to be the symbol of the Glass Triangle program and its resemblance to the symbol of the Freemasons. Of course, a series of conversations between the guests of the program on the live antenna caused more and caused him to say goodbye to the IRIB. After a five-year ban on IRIB, in June 2013, he took over the programs of Hassan Rouhani, the then presidential candidate. After the victory of Hassan Rouhani, on April 30, 2014, Rashidpour officially entered the IRIB and started the sunglasses comedy program on IRIB Nasim. His return provoked reactions. In May 2014, the pro-government Kayhan newspaper wrote: The program "Sunglasses", which has been aired by a marginal presenter on IRIB Nasim since last week, has tried to promote the culture and character of millionaires in a thought-provoking move contrary to the custom of society! In the fall of 2014, the production of this program was stopped. In early May 2016, Rashidpour officially re-entered the IRIB and began broadcasting the program "Hala Khorshid" on IRIB TV3. On June 16, 2016, he appeared as a guest in the "Dorehami" program performed by Mehran Modiri. In response to Mehran Modiri's question about not working in the previous government, he said: "I have no will and will not have any will for the previous government, but I am proud to have spent part of my life in the current government in the media."

=== Interview ===
Sirous Gorjestani was recounting a memory from one of the clips of American singer Michael Jackson, which was interrupted by host Rashidpour, who said: "We will put an end to this memory and use your presence in future programs."

=== Anesthesia in the live program ===
On the morning of Wednesday, January 25, 2017, while performing the live program "Hala Khorshid", he lost consciousness and fell to the ground. He was not in a good mood from the beginning of the program. رضا رشیدپور برای مداوا به بیمارستان بقیةالله منتقل شد. According to the doctors, the nervous attack resulting from work activity was the main cause of anesthesia. Also, the public relations of Hala Khorshid program said:

Rashidpour's anesthesia was due to hypotension and now we have transferred him to Baqiyatallah Hospital. He is awake now.

=== Interview with Hassan Rouhani ===
Reza Rashidpour's interview with Hassan Rouhani in January 2018 was considered a deconstruction of television, given that the television gave most of the important and live interviews to presenters who had been performing political programs for years. This conversation was met with many positive and negative criticisms.

=== Seven cinema program ===
After a lot of margins on choosing the host of the seven program Reza Rashidpour became the host of the most important cinema program in the country during the 36th Fajr International Film Festival, which aired every night for 10 nights on the IRIB TV3. The show received some critical acclaim in the early days, but in the midst of a positive wave of support from critics and major film writers.

== Entering the field of cinema producer ==
Reza Rashidpour announced his entry into the field of film production in June 2019 with a film called Stay on the Radar. Rashidpour said of the film, "It tells the story of the pilot of a passenger plane who is forced to tell his passengers the terrible news that happened on the ground at an altitude of 33,000 feet." Pre-production of this project will start after Eid al-Fitr. Many of the actors in this film are young and the director of this film is young and the first film. "The role of the pilot, which is one of the most important roles in the story, is entrusted to a foreign actor."

== Awards ==
In March 2019, Rashidpour, along with Ehsan Alikhani, Mohammad Delavari and Rambod Javan, were selected as the top presenters of Jaame Jam.

== Activities ==
=== Presenter ===
- Mosalas (Triangle)
- Shabe Shishei (Glass Night)
- Oboore Shishei (Glass Crossing)
- Mosalas Shishei (Glass Triangle)
- Zendeh Rood (Live River)
- Did Dar Shab (Night Vision)
- Sefr Sefr (Zero Zero)
- Hala Khorshid (Now The Sun)
- Haft (Seven)
- Shab Aram (Calm Night) (Yaldā Night)
- The Event (Event)
- The Event: Ninety and New (Nowruz)
- Sime Akhar (The Last Wire)

=== Actor ===
==== Cinema ====
- Penniless (2007)
- Superstar (2009)
- Along the city (2010)
- Six and Besh (2011)
- Along the city (2011)
- Fazel family honor (2013)
- Domestic killer (2016)

==== Television ====
- Man of Many Faces

=== Director ===
- Eynak Aftabi (Sunglasses) (IRIB Nasim)
- Did Dar Shab (Night vision) (Internet program)

=== Producer ===
- Did Dar Shab (Night vision)
- Hala Khorshid (Now the sun)
- Shab Aram (Calm night)
- Atseh (Sneezing)

=== Home video ===
- Amazing Stars - Directed by Farzad Farahvashi (2018)
