= Seven (TV program) =

Iranian television program

- TV and Cinema Analytical Program
- Genre: Review and analysis of film and cinema
- Directed by: Mojtaba Amini
- Presented by: Fereydoun Jeyrani (2010–2012); Mahmoud Gaberlou (2012–2015); Behrouz Afkhami (2015–2017); Reza Rashidpour (2018); Mohammad Hossein Latifi (2019–present)
- Judges: Massoud Farasati; Saeed Ghotbizadeh; Khosro Naghibi; Javad Toosi; Amir Ghaderi and others
- Narrated by: Naser Tahmasb
- Country of origin: Iran
- Original language: Persian

Production
- Producer: Mojtaba Amini
- Production location: Tehran
- Running time: 150 minutes

Original release
- Network: IRIB TV3
- Release: 2010 – present

Seven (Persian: هفت, "Haft") is an Iranian television program produced by IRIB TV3 that examines the issues of Iranian and world cinema. This program will be broadcast on Friday nights as a recording on IRIB TV3. "Seven" invites Iranian artists, critics and cultural officials in the field of cinema and television to discuss, critique, analyze and review film and cinema.

== First series ==
The initial idea of making such a program, which should be similar to the Navad sports program, leading to the field of culture and art, was presented by Fereydoun Jeyrani to the social group of IRIB TV3 and was welcomed by the then manager. At that time, the host of the program was Hamid Pendashteh and Fereydoun Jeyrani was in charge of directing, producing and performing. Although the first episodes of this series were met with a lot of criticism due to the unusual performance of Jeyrani and the unconditional criticism of Massoud Farasati, but over time, he was able to provide a large audience and provide an acceptable definition of himself. This program was suspended in June 2012 by the directors of IRIB, and Jeyrani was fired. Fazlullah Shariatpanahi, director of the social group of IRIB TV3, increased media criticism of Jeyrani's remarks in programs leading up to that date and repeated remarks by the directors of IRIB and Ezzatollah Zarghami himself, as well as some media outlets to Jeyrani about his remarks in this program. Effective in this change considered the executor. Fereydoun Jeyrani blamed his resignation on the start of a project to make a television series, and later blamed opposition to government cinema for his removal. Haft Jeyrani had recently become more successful, more popular, and more responsive by choosing the right journalistic approaches. Another positive point of the Jeyrani period was giving the opportunity to speak to the opposition and the supporters alike, which also increased the number of viewers of Iranian television. This period also faced criticisms such as flaws in the decor and design of the program, as well as the way the art critic of the program, Farasati, expressed and criticized.

== Second series ==
After ousting Jeyrani, options such as Mohammad Khazaei and Nader Talebzadeh were introduced as presenters. But in the end, Mahmoud Gaberlou, who has a history of cultural activities, including attending critique sessions at the Fajr Film Festival, took charge of the program and aired the first part of the new series of the Haft program in the program dated 29 June 2012. Also, the production of this series, which was initially entrusted to Mohammad Khazaei, with his resignation, reached Mohammad Gaberlou, a cinema press critic.

After leaving out Fereydoun Jeyrani and Massoud Farasati after a few months, and criticisms such as that Gaberlou was not very successful in leading challenging debates or that there was too much conservatism in his remarks were among the accusations leveled against him by some filmmakers and critics that Gaberlou was ousted in late August.

But in this period, we can point to the negative points such as the neutrality of the program and… and the positive points such as accepting the invitation of different strata of directors and critics in this period, which can be referred to the presence of Masoud Kimiai, Rakhshān Banietemad and Shahab Hosseini.

== Third series ==
Haft program continued for three years, but it did not live up to Gaberlou. With the change of the management of the IRIB and consequently the different networks, whispers of change and transformation were heard in Haft. The three-week closure of the program fueled rumors, but Mahmoud Gaberlou attributed the closure to religious occasions and said the program would continue to work more vigorously from the second month of summer. He even complained about the rumors of his change, saying, "I have heard rumors in recent days and I complain about some media friends who spread these rumors without following up on the issue. "Media people are expected to use knowledge beyond the yellow topics to critique a cinema analytical program and not get caught up in the yellow media topics." But the yellow media issues were real, especially when Gholamreza Mirhosseini, the then director of IRIB TV3, said in an interview that changes to Haft Program were inevitable: "Changes in Network are inevitable, especially changes in the content of Haft Program, which according to the new approach IRIB TV3, based on recreation, entertainment and competition, will definitely change some of our programs." Speculations began and many letters were raised for the implementation of Haft program, from Farzad Hassani to the return of Fereydoun Jeyrani and letters such as Mohammad Reza Shahidifard, Mansour Zabetian and Akbar Nabavi. Of course, these speculations were not limited to the performance of Haft, but the editor of this program was also the subject of many discussions in the media. While the main ideas were based on the leadership of this program by one of the cinema people such as Mohammad-Reza Sharifinia, Mohammad Hossein Latifi, Rasul Sadr Ameli or Behrouz Afkhami, others also mentioned different letters such as Javad Shamaqdari and Hassan Abbasi. Finally, Gaberlou's departure from the program was confirmed, and finally, among all the options that were considered for the performance and editing of Haft, a final name was given, and in the end, Behrouz Afkhami, the prominent director of cinema, was chosen as the presenter and director of Haft. With the coming to power of Afkhami, the type of work and the method of the Haft programs underwent major changes. New sections Separating sections of dialogue, film review and screening, book introduction, film introduction, panel discussion, report and box office of world cinema, introduction of stage theaters, film competition with prize and photo novel section are the most important items of Haft Afkhami. With the beginning of this series of Haft program, at first, the program met with a positive reaction from viewers and cinema people, but this event soon disappeared and Haft, with Afkhami as the director and producer and Farasati as a regular critic, with reactions from Faced with critics and filmmakers.

Finally, Behrouz Afkhami, due to the expiration of his 2-year contract with the IRIB, after holding a meeting in this regard with the managers of the organization, refused to continue working with this program. He said in this regard:

"I told the directors at that meeting that I wanted to start making my own film. "Because I think I have said everything else and I have achieved what I wanted in Haft."

== Fourth series ==
From 2 February 2018, at the same time with the 36th Fajr Film Festival, the fourth series, with the performance of Reza Rashidpour, was broadcast on IRIB TV3, and ended on 11 February 2018.

== Fifth series ==
From 30 January 2019, at the same time with the 37th Fajr Film Festival, the fifth series with the performance of Mohammad Hossein Latifi was broadcast on IRIB TV3. In this series of the program, unlike the previous series, Massoud Farasati returned to the program and was a critic with the presence of Farasati as a presenter-expert and other guest critics such as Saeed Ghotbizadeh and Mohammad Taghi Fahim. The Haft movie program is broadcast every week on IRIB TV3.

== Presenter ==
- Fereydoun Jeyrani from 30 April 2010 to 11 May 2012
- Mahmoud Gaberlou from 29 June 2012 to May 2015
- Behrouz Afkhami from 2 October 2015 to 10 March 2017
- Reza Rashidpour from 2 February 2018 to 12 February 2018 (Special Fajr Festival)
- Mohammad Hossein Latifi from 30 January 2019 to present

== Sections ==
- Film and cinema analysis
- Check box office sales of the week
- Roundtable with cinema guests, cultural officials and artists
- Behind-the-scenes reports of film production, public screenings and interviews with cinema activists and public opinion
- Roundtable on film critique and analysis
- Informing the news of Iranian cinema and its margins
