= Bist Hejdah =

TV program

- Genre: 2018 FIFA World Cup
- Created by: Adel Ferdosipour
- Presented by: Adel Ferdosipour; Mohammad Reza Ahmadi
- Theme music composer: Bist Hejdah Music
- Country of origin: Iran
- Original language: Persian

Production
- Producer: Adel Ferdosipour
- Camera setup: 16:9
- Production company: IRIB TV3 Sports Group

Original release
- Network: IRIB TV3
- Release: 11 June – 15 July 2018

Bist Hejdah (Persian: بیست‌هجده, transl. Twenty Eighteen) was a live TV program covering the 2018 FIFA World Cup in Russia. The program was produced by Adel Ferdosipour and hosted by him and Mohammad Reza Ahmadi. This program was the most watched Iran media program for the 2018 FIFA World Cup. Bist Hejdah started working on 11 June 2018, and ended on 15 July 2018, with the end of the 2018 FIFA World Cup. Bist Hejdah included a variety of items that in part introduced the countries present at this major sporting event. A number of dubbing artists and actors, including Manouchehr Zandedel, Amir Joshaghani, and... narrated this section. Mohammad Hossein Misaghi was the reporter of this program in Russia. The title song of the Bist Hejdah program was composed by Sirvan Khosravi. In Bist Hejdah, 56 matches of the 2018 FIFA World Cup were broadcast live.

The presence of Ali Parvin and Heshmat Mohajerani in Bist Hejdah was one of the important events in this program. Heshmat Mohajerani and Ali Parvin, the beloved coach and captain of the Iran national team for many years, were the guests of the first episode of the "Bist Hejdah" special program. Samuel Eto'o was also a guest on the show.

== Background ==
Bist Hejdah program was founded in 2018 by Adel Ferdosipour to cover the 2018 FIFA World Cup. The first episode of the Bist Hejdah program was broadcast on 11 June 2018. 15 July 2018 was the last episode of this program.

== Attributes ==
=== Broadcast ===
Bist Hejdah program aired every day for a month.

=== Performance ===
The hosts of this program were Adel Ferdosipour and Mohammad Reza Ahmadi.

== Theme ==
=== Program process ===
Bist Hejdah program covered, reviewed and analyzed the 2018 FIFA World Cup and related events every day. Typically, the program broadcast the 2018 FIFA World Cup matches, covered the news, and analyzed match-related issues in the presence of experts and reviewed the margins of the 2018 World Cup.

=== Program sections ===
- Broadcast matches:

In this program, the 2018 World Cup matches were broadcast.

- Expert:

In each program, an expert commented on the matches.

- Items:

Every day in this section, items from teams, players and coaches of the World Cup and related issues were broadcast.

- Guest:

In each episode, coaches and players, some of whom were foreigners, were invited to the program to discuss various issues with the host.

- World Cup news:

A summary of the most important news related to the 2018 World Cup was broadcast in this section.

- Predictive polls:

Every day, a poll was presented as a prediction of the World Cup matches, in which viewers were asked to send a response to the number 20002018 or to participate in it through the Bist Hejdah application as well as the Rubika application. This part of the program was attended by millions of viewers.

- Technical analysis:

In this section, the World Cup matches (from a technical or quality point of view) were analyzed by a multiplayer team, and the result was broadcast with images related to the match and the voice of Adel Ferdosipour.

- Thematic documentaries:

In this program, short documentaries with literary text were broadcast in proportion to what happened in the World Cup. Usually, these documentaries covered political, social, and cultural issues in addition to football.

- Pre-match:

In this section, the conditions of the teams organizing the match in the previous matches were examined, and a statistical review was performed along with a historical perspective.

== Margins ==
=== Absence of Puyol in Bist Hejdah ===
On 20 June 2018, the day of the Iran-Spain match, Carles Puyol, the former captain of FC Barcelona and Spain, was scheduled to come to the Bist Hejdah program and talk to Adel Ferdosipour. But this was prevented for some reason. There has been a lot of talk about banning Puyol from Attend the program. At first they said he did not want to sit in front of the camera because he had not received any money. Then it was announced that due to the strange economic situation, a strange and huge budget was spent on the presence of this player in Iran, the officials of the IRIB stopped him from appearing in the live broadcast in order to discipline Adel Ferdosipour and this famous presenter sought to attract Not to be important figures in world football with huge expenses to Iran. Finally, the long hair of this veteran was discussed and some people claimed that because Puyol's hair is long, the managers of the IRIB did not like their taste that such a figure should enter the Bist Hejdah studio so that he does not become a role model for Iranian youth! In the last comment, we heard that Puyol had not agreed to go into the studio in a long-sleeved shirt and cover his tattoos, so he was not allowed to enter the Bist Hejdah program, and although he even went behind the scenes, they said that he had no right to go. Go to the camera. In some Iranian media, Carles Puyol was quoted as saying after the cancellation of his television program:

I was told that I could not attend the program due to physical problems.

Adel Ferdosipour protested against this decision until an hour before the start of the match between the national teams of Iran and Spain, and Mohammad Reza Ahmadi spent hours alone performing the program.

== See also ==
- Adel Ferdosipour
- Mohammad Reza Ahmadi
- Navad
- Bist Chahardah
