= Bist Chahardah =

Iranian live TV show

- Genre: 2014 FIFA World Cup
- Created by: Adel Ferdosipour
- Presented by: Adel Ferdosipour; Reza Javdani; Mohammad Hossein Misaghi
- Theme music composer: Bist Chahardah Music
- Country of origin: Iran
- Original language: Persian

Production
- Producer: Adel Ferdosipour
- Camera setup: 16:9
- Production company: IRIB TV3 Sports Group

Original release
- Network: IRIB TV3
- Release: 9 June – 13 July 2014

Bist Chahardah (Persian: بیست‌چهارده, transl. Twenty Fourteen) was a live TV show covering the 2014 FIFA World Cup in Brazil. The program was produced by Adel Ferdosipour and hosted by Adel Ferdosipour, Reza Javdani and Mohammad Hossein Misaghi. This program was the most watched Iran media program for the 2014 FIFA World Cup. Bist Chahardah started working on 9 June 2014 and ended on 13 July 2014 with the end of the 2014 FIFA World Cup.

The guest of the first episode of the Bist Chahardah was Dunga, the former captain of Brazil. The program aired from evening until around morning. Of course, this program was not always dedicated to broadcasting the competitions, and other sections such as news, commentary, margins, humor, SMS lottery and... ‌were also included in it. Also, Carlos Queiroz, after the completion of the work of the Iran national football team in the 2014 FIFA World Cup, appeared in this program.

The program covered topics such as World Cup news, technical expertise of matches, introduction of countries, margins of games and live broadcast of matches.

== Background ==
Bist Chahardah was founded in 2014 by Adel Ferdosipour to cover the 2014 FIFA World Cup. The first episode of the Bist Chahardah program was broadcast on 9 June 2014. 13 July 2014 was the last episode of this program.

== Attributes ==
=== Broadcast ===
Bist Chahardah program went on the air every day for 1 month.

=== Performance ===
The hosts of this program were Adel Ferdosipour, Reza Javdani and Mohammad Hossein Misaghi.

== Theme ==
=== Program process ===
Bist Chahardah program aired daily, covering, reviewing and analyzing the 2014 FIFA World Cup and related events. Typically, the program covered the 2014 FIFA World Cup matches, covered the news, and analyzed game-related issues with experts and reviewed the margins of the 2014 World Cup.

=== Program sections ===
- Broadcast matches:

The program broadcast the 2014 World Cup matches.

- Expert:

In each program, an expert commented on the games.

- Items:

Every day in this section, items from teams, players and coaches of the World Cup and related issues were broadcast.

- Guest:

In each episode, coaches and players, some of whom were foreigners, were invited to the program to discuss various issues with the host.

- World Cup news:

A summary of the most important news related to the 2014 World Cup was broadcast in this section. The presenter of this section was Mohammad Hossein Misaghi.

- Predictive polls:

Every day, a poll was presented as a prediction of the World Cup matches, in which viewers were asked to send the answer to 20002014. This part of the program was attended by millions of viewers.

- Technical analysis:

In this section, the World Cup matches (from a technical or quality point of view) were analyzed by a multiplayer team, and the result was broadcast with images related to the match and the voice of Adel Ferdosipour.

- Thematic documentaries:

In this program, short documentaries with literary text were broadcast in proportion to what happened in the World Cup. Usually, these documentaries covered political, social, and cultural issues in addition to football.

- Pre-match:

In this section, the conditions of the teams organizing the match in the previous matches were examined, and a statistical review was performed along with a historical perspective.

== See also ==
- Adel Ferdosipour
- Mohammad Hossein Misaghi
- Navad
- Bist Hejdah
