= Gozareshe Varzeshi =

Iranian television program for broadcasting European football

- Genre: Football
- Created by: Hossein Zokaei
- Presented by: Current: Reza Javdani (2002–) Former: Mohammad Reza Ahmadi (2010–2020)
- Voices of: Mohammad Reza Ahmadi; Javad Khiabani; Peyman Yousefi; Farshad Mohammadi Maram; Abbas Ghane; Mohammad Sianaki; Alireza Dehghani; Reza Mohammad Ali; Payam Basiji; Mohammad Reza Hakimi; Reza Jafari; Gholamreza Dadkhah; Mehdi Sharifi; Atour Chaharbakhshi; Nima Tajik; Mohammad Reza Balapour; Ahmad Reza Vahabi; Esmaeil Jangholi; Shahab Vahabi; Majid Abedi
- Narrated by: Amin Ghazi; Mohammad Mir; Saman Kajouri
- Country of origin: Iran
- Original language: Persian
- No. of seasons: 22

Production
- Producer: Hossein Zokaei
- Camera setup: 16:9
- Running time: 90–120 minutes
- Production company: IRIB TV3 Sports Group

Original release
- Network: IRIB TV3
- Release: 9 August 2002 – present

Gozareshe Varzeshi (Persian: گزارش ورزشی, transl. Sports Report) is an Iranian television program for broadcasting European football on IRIB TV3. The founder and producer of this program is Hossein Zokaei and the host of the program is Reza Javdani. This program broadcasts European league matches as well as examines the events and fringes around European football.

== Background ==
Gozareshe Varzeshi was launched in 2002, with the first episode being broadcast on 9 August 2002.

== Attributes ==
=== Broadcast ===
Gozareshe Varzeshi airs on the day of major European football matches about 10 minutes before the start of the match.

=== Performance ===
The current host of the program is Reza Javdani. Reza Javdani has been the host of the program since 2002 and Mohammad Reza Ahmadi was the host of the program from 2010 to 2020.

== Theme ==
=== Program process ===
Gozareshe Varzeshi program reviews and analyzes European football-related events every week. Typically, the program broadcasts football matches from England, Spain, Germany, Italy, France, UEFA Champions League. Parts of the program also focus on the fringes and news related to European football.

=== Program sections ===
- Broadcast matches:

This program broadcasts important European football games.

- Poll:

Viewers of the program can participate in the match reporter evaluation poll on the official Telegram channel of Gozareshe Varzeshi after each match.

- Items:

This section features items from European football teams, players and coaches.

- European football news:

A summary of the most important European football news is reviewed in this section.

- Thematic documentaries:

In this program, depending on the events of the past week (or future), short documentaries and sometimes with literary text will be broadcast. Usually, these documentaries cover not only football but also social and cultural issues.

- Pre-match:

In this section, a review of the conditions of the teams organizing the match in the previous weeks, a statistical review with a historical perspective is done.

- Review of European football newspapers:

This program usually examines the headlines of prestigious European football newspapers, including the football newspapers of England, Spain and Italy.

== List of competitions ==
Country	Competition name
England	Premier League
England	FA Cup
England	EFL Cup
England	FA Community Shield
Spain	La Liga
Spain	Copa del Rey
Spain	Supercopa de España
Germany	Bundesliga
Germany	DFB-Pokal
Germany	DFL-Supercup
Italy	Serie A
Italy	Coppa Italia
Italy	Supercoppa Italiana
France	Ligue 1
France	Coupe de France
France	Trophée des Champions
World	FIFA World Cup qualification
World	Exhibition game
World	FIFA Club World Cup
World	International Champions Cup
Europe	UEFA Champions League
Europe	UEFA Europa League
Europe	UEFA European Championship qualifying
Europe	UEFA Nations League
Europe	UEFA Super Cup

== Margins ==
=== Censoring the A.S. Roma logo ===
In the pre-match between FC Barcelona and A.S. Roma in the 2017–18 UEFA Champions League, which ended in a 4–1 victory for the Catalans, the logo of A.S. Roma team (breastfeeding a wolf to two children) was censored, which had a global impact and even provoked a reaction from virtual users. And even caused the A.S. Roma team to create its own Persian page on Twitter to communicate with Persian-speaking fans.
