= Hala Khorshid =

Iranian television program

- Genre: Social; Talk show Issues of the day Conversational
- Created by: Reza Rashidpour
- Presented by: Reza Rashidpour; Parviz Neshat; Hamid Torabian; Ali Aali
- Country of origin: Iran
- Original language: Persian

Production
- Camera setup: 16:9
- Running time: 130 minutes

Original release
- Network: IRIB TV3
- Release: 30 April 2016 – 13 March 2019

Hala Khorshid (Persian: حالا خورشید, transl. Now The Sun) was an Iranian morning TV program produced and performed by Reza Rashidpour with a social background and an active, lively and attractive atmosphere, which was broadcast from Saturday to Thursday on IRIB TV3.

Hala Khorshid included various sections such as: reviewing the country's daily newspapers, talking to guests, yellow lights, idea exchange, underground, billboard and…

== Program sections ==
- Newspapers: Review of the country's daily newspapers and read important headlines and information
- Guest: Invite a guest related to the topic of the program and talk to him
- Yellow light: Review of marginal news and follow up on relevant issues from relevant officials and officials
- Idea Exchange: Get different ideas and find an investor
- Billboard: Introducing newsmakers in the last 24 hours
- Curriculum vitae: Examining the curriculum vitae of political and social figures and giving people a grade
- Counter and news: 5 minutes of newspaper reading and jokes with the hot news of the day
- Sports: Analysis of sports topics and events with the presence of sports journalist: Ali Aali
- Chi Chi Sho: In this section, a photo is displayed in the program and the virtual space of the program, and viewers are asked to write a comment in accordance with the subject of the photo and share it on the page of this program. The best comments will be read in the next program.
- Underground: A joke with old photos and videos performed by Hamid Parsa

== Program margins ==
- The presence of Mohammad Hosseinopour with the title of Dr. Sayan in April 2016 in the program Hala Khorshid, as the creator of a sports style and the author of a large encyclopedia who claimed to be Muhammad al-Mahdi shortly after his presence.
- The presence of Hossein Ataei, a 10-year-old car designer who claimed to have been invited to work with Tesla and Volvo and has several inventions, all of which were eventually denied.
