= The Last Wire =

Iranian television contest

- Genre: Game show
- Directed by: Mohammad Reza Rezaeian
- Presented by: Reza Rashidpour
- Country of origin: Iran
- Original language: Persian
- No. of seasons: 3

Production
- Producer: Mohammad Reza Rezaeian
- Running time: 70 minutes
- Production company: IRIB TV3

Original release
- Network: IRIB TV3
- Release: 5 November 2020 – 11 March 2022

The Last Wire (Persian: سیم آخر, "Sime Akhar") was an Iranian TV contest performed by Reza Rashidpour and produced and directed by Mohammad Reza Rezaeian, which was broadcast on IRIB TV3. This TV contest was previously called "Bomb" and was renamed "The Last Wire" on 5 November 2020. Peiman Ghane is the decor designer and artistic director and Hamid Maravandi is the executor of the project.

The Last Wire is an unlicensed copy of an Israeli television contest called Boom!, which was made in about twenty other countries in the world after Israel.

== Game format ==
A three-man team must try to defuse the bomb of each stage by answering the questions correctly and gain more points and rewards. In each episode, two teams of three participate separately. The opponent of each team of three is 7 match bombs that must try to neutralize them at each stage by answering the question related to each bomb correctly. The question of each bomb is in the form of several options and only one of the options is incorrect, ie each question of this match has several correct answers and only one incorrect answer. The maximum total points will reach 25,000 points by the sixth stage and 100,000 points by the seventh megabomb stage. Each 1,000 points will be equivalent to 600,000 Tomans and the maximum prize will be equal to 60,000,000 Tomans.

== Game rules ==
- In each episode, several teams of three people participate separately.
- The opponent of each three-man team is 7 match bombs that they must try to neutralize at each stage by answering the question related to each bomb correctly.
- The three-person team is placed in a position where the three lights are green. Each green light is for a team member and indicates the possibility of participating in each stage and answering the question. With the wrong answer, this light turns red.
- The question of each bomb is in the form of several options and only one of the options is incorrect. This means that each question in this quiz has several correct answers and only one incorrect answer.
- Bomb questions are selected from the following areas: Islamic and Quranic sciences / Persian language and literature / National honors / Zoology / Mathematics / Geography / Sports / History / Art / Chemistry / Physics and…
- Each response option on the display is marked with a different color and is connected to a wire of the same color in the bomb.
- Participants must cut only the wires of the correct options at the specified time and only the wires of the incorrect option remain at the end. If the wrong option wire is cut, the bomb will explode.
- Before the start of each stage, the question area is announced on the screen and the team chooses which member to move forward to answer the question and defuse the bomb in this stage and stand next to the bomb.
- First the options appear one by one on the screen and the facilitator asks the participant to guess the question of this step. (True or false guess has no effect on the competition process and is only for the mental preparation of the participants.)
- After the question appears, the timer activates and counts down until the end of that time. The participant must quickly identify the correct options one by one and cut the corresponding wire.
- When the participant cuts a wire, the timer stops temporarily and after three seconds, the correct or incorrect result appears on the display. (At the same time, the countdown sound is heard and the answer is correct or incorrect in the studio.)
- If the correct wire is cut, the timer will start again and the participant must quickly cut the rest of the correct wires.
- If the participant cuts all the correct wires at the specified time, the bomb will not explode and the score will be added to the team score bank.
- If the participant cuts the incorrect wire or runs out of time before cutting all the correct wires, the bomb will explode and the colored content inside the bomb will be scattered throughout the studio and participants.
- The point of this stage is lost and the participant is eliminated (the green light turns red) and it is no longer possible to participate in the competition until the seventh stage.
- Participants and performers wear protective goggles, and front-row spectators wear goggles and protective goggles on their clothing.
- Before the seventh stage, each participant must at least answer the questions of one stage and defuse a bomb.
- If all three participants are eliminated before the end of the sixth stage, the team will not receive any prizes and their points will be lost in the bank.
- If there is one participant left after the sixth round, the team must decide to leave the match here and win a prize based on its total points up to this round or answer the seventh question and neutralize the megabomb.
- The facilitator will inform the participants of the seventh question area so that they can more easily decide whether to stay or leave.
- The Mega Bomb question has ten options with 7 correct answers, three incorrect answers and 91 seconds of answering time.
- At this point, all three team members participate (regardless of whether or not they have already been eliminated) and all three stand by the bomb. One person cuts the wires and the other two consult.
- If the team defeats the Megabomb, they will receive a prize equal to four times their total points up to this stage. If they do not defuse the bomb, they will be rewarded with half of their points up to this point.

== Game prize ==
The prize money is awarded in the form of a scholarship and should be spent on the individual or first-degree family members themselves. Tuition fees can include the following:

- Tuition of educational centers such as school, university and…
- Tuition for training courses
- Buy educational equipment such as laptops, tablets, modems and…
- The prize money will be given to the bank related to the program and the third network, and the winners will receive the prize by presenting a letter of introduction from the network and invoices related to the training costs.
- The validity period of the award is one year after the issuance of the letter of introduction and after this time, the award will be refunded.
