= Mohammad Reza Ahmadi =

Television presenter

Mohamadreza Ahmadi محمدرضا احمدی
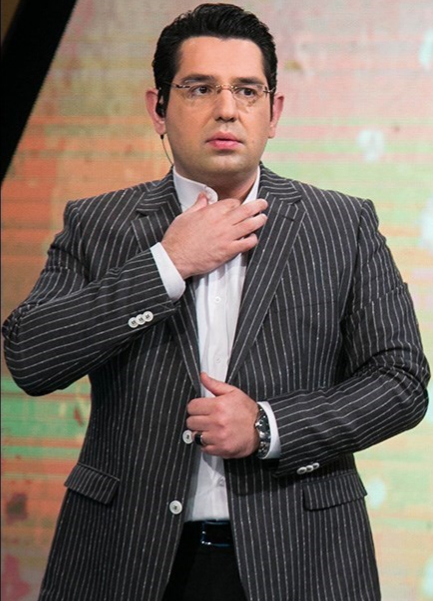
- Ahmadi is presenting Bist Hejdah
- Born: December 26, 1982 (age 43); Tehran, Iran
- Occupations: Television presenter, Football commentator
- Years active: 2003–present
- Known for: Football commentator Gozareshe Varzeshi Presenter

Mohamadreza Ahmadi (Persian: محمدرضا احمدی; born 26 December 1982 in Tehran, Iran) is a commentator and presenter of sports programs in IRIB. In 1999, Ahmadi tested TV for a commentator who was rejected and said he was too young and early; then he entered the radio in 2003 and began commentating.

== Programs ==
Year	Program name	Work	Channel
2010	Yek Jahan Yek Jam (A World A Cup)	Presenter	IRIB TV3
2010–2020	Gozareshe Varzeshi (Sports Report)	Presenter	IRIB TV3
2012	Jame Chahardahom (Fourteenth Cup)	Presenter	IRIB TV3
2012	Olympic 2012	Presenter	IRIB TV3
2014, 2018	Asia 3	Presenter	IRIB TV3
2014, 2015, 2017	Aghaye Gozareshgar (Mr. Reporter)	Presenter	IRIB TV3
2014	Beezafeye Football (Plus Football)	Presenter	IRIB TV3
2016	Jame Panzdahom (Fifteenth Cup)	Presenter	IRIB TV3
2016	Olympic 2016	Presenter, Reporter	IRIB TV3
2018	Bist Hejdah (Twenty Eighteen)	Presenter	IRIB TV3
2019	Asia 2019	Reporter	IRIB TV3
2019–2020	Record	Presenter	IRIB TV3
2019	Setareh Saz (Star Maker)	Presenter	IRIB TV3
2020	Mosbate Gozareshe Varzeshi (Sports Report Plus)	Presenter	IRIB TV3
2020–	Football Bartar (Premier Football)	Presenter	IRIB TV3
