= Football 120 =

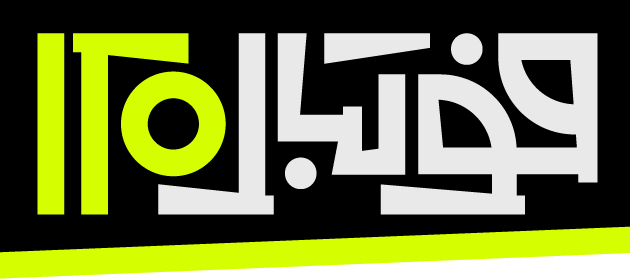
- Genre: Football
- Developed by: IRIB
- Presented by: Hamid Mohammadi (2013–2015, 2019–2023); Mohammad Hossein Misaghi (2015–2019)
- Country of origin: Iran
- Original language: Persian
- No. of seasons: 10

Production
- Producer: Adel Ferdosipour
- Running time: 120 minutes

Original release
- Network: IRIB Varzesh
- Release: 5 April 2013 – June 8, 2023

Football 120 (Persian: فوتبال ۱۲۰; Persian pronunciation: [ˌfutbɒl sædɵbist]) is a football TV program which broadcasts live on Thursday nights on IRIB Varzesh TV. Football 120 covers the highlights and goings on of the football world over the past week with its main focus being on Europe's top 5 leagues (Barclays Premier League, Bundesliga, Ligue 1, Serie A TIM and Laliga ), UEFA Champions League in addition to international friendlies and qualifiers. This program is produced by Adel Ferdosipour who also was producing and presenting Navad TV show at that moment. Ferdosipour is also a columnist for Iranian football in World Soccer. The show was first broadcast in March 2013. The last edition of the show was aired on June 8, 2023, marking Ferdosipour's complete departure from IRIB.

== History ==
Football 120's first season was televised in 7 episodes and featured the closing weeks of European football in 2012/2013 season and it was mainly intended to rectify the lack of European football shows in IRIB. Due to its unprecedented format amongst sports shows on Iranian TV, Football 120 soon became the most watched TV programme on IRIB Varzesh TV. Football 120 covered the featured leagues from the first matchday in 2013/2014 and 2014/2015 with a few enhancements compared to the first 7 episodes in 2012/2013 season.

== Features ==
=== Goals and Highlights ===
a round-up of the goals scored over the past 7 days in European top 5 leagues in addition to extended highlights for the big games or games featuring teams with the biggest fanbases.

=== Close up ===
a more focused look at the bigger games of the week and the derbies including interviews, statistics, goings on, etc.

=== Closer look ===
a more close look at some football men selected due to their birthday, retirement, a notable performance or winning a personal award over the past week.

=== Preview ===
previewing the biggest games in the upcoming week with a closer look at the statistics and the previous meetings between the sides.

=== Tactical Analysis ===
a brief punditry segment featuring Iranian managers or players.

=== Nostalgia ===
Including highlights of a classic encounter between two sides who are about to play each other in the upcoming week.

=== Out of Sight ===
a short review of the highlights from the formally well known footballers who now play their trades in less popular leagues.

=== Captured ===
A look at the most interesting football photos and pictures of the week.

=== History of football ===
A review of football competitions from the beginning like world cups, olympics, confederation cups, ... . each episode based on one country that most successful in that competition

=== SMS Competition ===
Viewers every week can take part in the poll presented in the program by sending an SMS. On average, 200,000 people take part in the polls which confirms Football120's position as the most watched sports show on Iranian television. The record number of messages received is 500,000 for an episode aired in March 2017 with the producer himself present in the studio as the show's guest.

== Exclusive Interviews ==
Football120 has had numerous exclusive interviews with well-known people in football over the past few years including Adel Ferdosipour’s interviews with Xavi, Clarence Seedorf and Luis Garcia. Also, other notable figures such as Diego Forlán, Wesley Sneijder, Gaizka Mendieta, Fernando Morientes, Emre Can, Christian Karembeu, Martin Tyler and established football pundits and journalists including Sid Lowe and Guillem Balague have had exclusive interviews with Futball120.
