= Videocheck =

Iranian sports comedy TV program

- Genre: Sports
- Presented by: Abdullah Rava
- Country of origin: Iran
- Original language: Persian
- No. of seasons: 6

Production
- Producer: Mojtaba Azari
- Camera setup: 16:9
- Running time: About 30 minutes
- Production company: IRIB Varzesh

Original release
- Network: IRIB Varzesh
- Release: 4 January 2018 – present

Videocheck (Persian: ویدیوچک) is an Iranian television program, which is broadcast every Thursday on IRIB Varzesh. This program has a large audience and has a humorous look at the issues of Iran's sports day. The host of this program is Abdullah Rava. The first episode of this program aired on IRIB Varzesh on 4 January 2018.

== Broadcast time ==
This 30-minute program goes on the air every Thursday at about 20:30 and is repeated on Fridays at 11:20 and on Mondays at 21:30.

== Program agents ==
Presenter: Abdullah Rava / Writers Group: Mojtaba Azari, Abdullah Rava, Ali Ghasemi, Mohamad hosein Ghasemi, Afshar Moghadam / Decor: Reza Ostovari / Production Manager: Ismail Jafari / Report: Mohamad Hosein Ghasemi / Sound Recordist: Seyed Davood Sharbati / Image: Amir Hossein Droudian / Editor: Ehsan Hosseini / Title and animated graphics: Hamed Barei Tabari / Teaser Special effects: Mehdi Arshian - Hadi Arshian / Producer and Director: Abdullah Rava / Broadcast time: 20:30

== See also ==
- IRIB Varzesh
