= The Wheel (American game show) =

British television game show

- Promotional poster featuring Michael McIntyre at the bottom
- Genre: Game show
- Created by: Michael McIntyre; Dan Baldwin
- Directed by: Chris Power
- Presented by: Michael McIntyre
- Theme music composer: Paul Farrer
- Country of origin: United States
- Original language: English
- No. of seasons: 1
- No. of episodes: 10

Production
- Executive producers: Jeff Apploff; Michael McIntyre; Dan Baldwin; Noah Bonnett; Mike Darnell; Brooke Karzen
- Production location: Warner Bros. Studios, Burbank
- Running time: 43 minutes
- Production companies: Apploff Entertainment; Hungry McBear; Warner Horizon Unscripted Television

Original release
- Network: NBC
- Release: December 19 – December 30, 2022

Related
- The Wheel

The Wheel is an American television game show hosted by Michael McIntyre that aired on NBC from December 19 to December 30, 2022. It is an adaptation of the British television series of the same name. Three contestants compete on each episode for a chance to win up to $180,000, drawing on the expertise of six celebrities in a variety of subjects.

== Gameplay ==
=== Main game ===
Six celebrities, each designated as an expert in a different subject, sit in chairs mounted on the outer edge of a large wheel on the main stage. They face toward the center, below which three contestants sit in chairs on a smaller wheel. This wheel is spun to choose a contestant at random, who is lifted to the main stage.

In each round, the contestant chooses a subject, whose expert's seat lights up in gold, and also an expert to "shut down" – the one they believe is least likely to know about the subject, whose seat lights up red. The wheel is then spun to choose an expert randomly; if it does not stop on the "shut-down" one, the host asks a question with four multiple-choice answers. The contestant may discuss it with the expert before locking in an answer; a correct response adds $10,000 to the bank if the subject expert was spun, or $5,000 otherwise. If the contestant misses a question or spins a "shut down" expert, their turn ends and they are lowered back down to the smaller wheel, which is spun to choose a new contestant. Since the selection is random and all three contestants are always eligible to be chosen, the same contestant can return to the game immediately after being dismissed. Each subject remains in play until a contestant correctly answers a question in it.

The other five experts also answer the question, using keypads to lock in their answers. If an expert misses a question in their subject, whether or not they were spun for it, they are automatically shut down for the next round in addition to the expert chosen by the contestant. If all six experts answer correctly (a "Perfect Wheel"), a bonus of $5,000 is added to the bank. After all six subjects have been completed, the current contestant moves on to the final and has the first chance to win the money.

=== Final: Cashout ===
The experts are ranked by how many questions they have answered correctly during the game. The contestant may choose the best, third-best, or worst performer to assist them; these choices respectively set the prize at 50%, 100%, or 200% of the banked total.

The wheel is spun to choose one of three new subjects, after which the host asks a question. The contestant may discuss it with the chosen expert for 30 seconds before locking in their final answer. A correct answer awards the money at stake to the contestant and ends the game. If the contestant misses, they are returned to the smaller wheel and a new contestant is chosen. The subject of the missed question, the expert chosen for it, and the prize associated with them are all removed from play. If the contestants miss questions with all three experts, they leave with nothing.

The maximum potential winnings total is $180,000, achievable by correctly answering a question in all six subjects with the help of the respective experts, achieving a "Perfect Wheel" in every round, and giving a correct answer in the final with the worst performer.

== Production ==
In February 2021, it was announced that NBC had made a 10-episode order for an American adaptation of The Wheel. In May 2021, it was announced that the show would premiere in the 2021–22 television season. In August 2021, it was announced that the show would premiere in 2022, with Michael McIntyre as host. However, in May 2022, it was reported that the show might premiere in 2023, either midseason or summer.

In November 2022, it was announced that the show would premiere on December 19, 2022, with its ten episodes airing across two weeks, during the holiday season.

In June 2023, it was reported that the series was canceled after one season.

== Episodes ==
No.	Title	Original release date	Prod. code	U.S. viewers (millions)
1	"The Wheel: Premiere"	December 19, 2022	101	1.38
Celebrity Experts: Christina Ricci, Todrick Hall, Cat Cora, Mark McGrath, Amber Ruffin and Steve Kornacki
2	"Boats, Soaps & Wrestling Ropes"	December 20, 2022	102	1.73
Celebrity Experts: Vivica A. Fox, Mike "The Miz" Mizanin, JoJo, John Urschel, Captain Sandy and Bruno Tonioli
3	"Déjà Vu & Eyes of Blue"	December 21, 2022	103	1.65
Celebrity Experts: Tori Spelling, Ricki Lake, Mark Sanchez, Judge Greg Mathis, Amber Ruffin and Justin Willman
4	"Divas & Derbies"	December 22, 2022	104	1.72
Celebrity Experts: Amber Riley, Carnie Wilson, Steve Kornacki, Sheila E., Buddy Valastro and Jaime Camil
5	"Fish n' Chips & Gold Medal Flips"	December 23, 2022	105	1.34
Celebrity Experts: Tom Bergeron, Shawn Johnson East, Captain Lee, Kyla Pratt, Victor Cruz and Debbie Gibson
6	"Big Cats & Bigger Brains"	December 26, 2022	106	2.22
Celebrity Experts: Deepak Chopra, Raven-Symoné, Matt Iseman, Bre-Z, Terrell Owens and Carole Baskin
7	"Sky Hooks & The Almighty Book"	December 27, 2022	107	2.19
Celebrity Experts: Taye Diggs, Jalen Rose, Lyric Lewis, Ester Dean, Josh Flagg and Christine Chiu
8	"Wigs Galore, Dogs & More"	December 28, 2022	108	1.91
Celebrity Experts: Andy Richter, Kate Flannery, Margaret Cho, Loni Love, Bobby Berk and Adam Rippon
9	"A Spin, a Twin & a Win"	December 29, 2022	109	2.23
Celebrity Experts: Chrissy Metz, Clay Aiken, Sanya Richards-Ross, Russell Dickerson, Loni Love and Brie Bella
10	"The Skater & the Dater"	December 30, 2022	110	2.20
Celebrity Experts: Christina Ricci, Tony Hawk, Chris Kattan, Kym Whitley, Jackie Tohn and Curtis Stone

== Reception ==
Viewership and ratings per episode of The Wheel
No.	Title	Air date	Timeslot (ET)	Rating (18–49)	Viewers (millions)
1	"The Wheel: Premiere"	December 19, 2022	Monday 10:00 p.m.	0.2	1.38
2	"Boats, Soaps & Wrestling Ropes"	December 20, 2022	Tuesday 10:00 p.m.	0.3	1.73
3	"Déjà Vu & Eyes of Blue"	December 21, 2022	Wednesday 10:00 p.m.	0.3	1.65
4	"Divas & Derbies"	December 22, 2022	Thursday 10:00 p.m.	0.3	1.72
5	"Fish n' Chips & Gold Medal Flips"	December 23, 2022	Friday 10:00 p.m.	0.2	1.34
6	"Big Cats & Bigger Brains"	December 26, 2022	Monday 8:00 p.m.	0.3	2.22
7	"Sky Hooks & The Almighty Book"	December 27, 2022	Tuesday 8:00 p.m.	0.3	2.19
8	"Wigs Galore, Dogs & More"	December 28, 2022	Wednesday 8:00 p.m.	0.3	1.91
9	"A Spin, a Twin & a Win"	December 29, 2022	Thursday 8:00 p.m.	0.3	2.23
10	"The Skater & the Dater"	December 30, 2022	Friday 8:00 p.m.	0.3	2.20
