= FIVB Club World Championship =

FIVB Club World Championship may refer to

- FIVB Volleyball Men's Club World Championship
- FIVB Volleyball Women's Club World Championship
