= Mohammad Delavari =

Iranian writer, journalist and television presenter (born 1973)

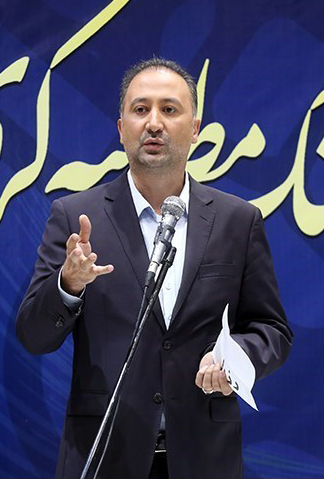
- Born: 1973 (age 51–52); Tehran, Iran
- Education: Master of Political science
- Occupations: Writer; journalist; presenter

Mohammad Delavari (Persian: محمد دلاوری) is an Iranian writer, journalist and television presenter.

== Media career ==
In March 2019, Delavari was selected as one of the top presenters of Jaam-e-Jam. In 2020, he was one of the candidates for best TV personality in the Hafez Awards.

In 2019, he was fired from television for his criticism of Iranian politicians, but later resumed his career. Some of his TV programs, among them "Tehran 20", stirred up on-line controversy.

== Published books ==
He is the author of several books including the series “Journalism without pain and bleeding”. Upon returning from his assignment in Europe, Delavari published the book 976 Days in the Streets of Europe, which went to print ten times.
