= Be Winner =

Iranian television contest

- Logo
- Presented by: Mohammad Reza Golzar
- Country of origin: Iran
- Original language: Persian

Production
- Producers: Hashem Rezayat; Hamid Rahimi Nadi
- Running time: About 60 minutes
- Production company: Afkar Iranian Hooshmand Company

Original release
- Network: IRIB TV3
- Release: 6 August 2018 – 25 April 2019

Be Winner (Persian: برنده باش, "Barandeh Bash") was an Iranian TV contest hosted by Mohammad Reza Golzar and produced by Hashem Rezayat and Hamid Rahimi Nadi. Participants in the competition had to answer a variety of questions based on general information. Increasing the reading rate and raising public awareness and information among the audience were one of the main goals of this competition. In each part of the competition, four people who had already answered the program application questions correctly, sat on the program chair and entered the competition by answering the questions in a step-by-step manner to win a prize of 1,000,000,000 rials.

== Competition participation ==
Participation in this competition was possible only by participating in the initial test through a mobile application. People who wanted to participate in this competition, both as spectators and as participants, had to collect points through this application. People earned points by answering the questions and increased their chances of attending the program.

== Criticism ==
Due to the method of participating in the competition and the need to buy a package to answer the application questions and earn points, some (including the authorities of Islamic imitation) considered this program as gambling and like lottery competitions. Saman Faegh, a member of the board of directors of Afkar Iranian Hooshmand Company, the organizer of the contest, said: "Of course, there is no obligation for users to buy packages in the application, and users make purchases with personal intention and desire. "This purchase extension is not available for the app and no further charges will be deducted from the customer's account in the future."

Also, the existence of mistakes in the contest questions has caused a lot of margins and criticisms.

== Termination of the broadcast ==
On 25 April 2019, following the criticism of Ali Khamenei and Naser Makarem Shirazi of this program, this popular contest was removed from the conductor of IRIB TV3 and stopped broadcasting.
