= ¡Boom! =

Spanish game show

¡Boom! is a Spanish game show, adapted from the Israeli show Boom!. The Spanish series ran from 9 September 2014 to 7 May 2023 on Antena 3, and 9 September to 6 December 2024 on Cuatro. It was presented by Juanra Bonet on Antena 3 and Christian Gálvez on Cuatro.

The team Los Lobos won two Guinness World Records for their performance on the show: most consecutive wins on a game show (505) and largest total winnings (€6,689,700).

== Format ==
While the format of the show varied across its run, the gameplay mechanic is to defuse bombs by cutting coloured wires reflecting correct answers to a question. An incorrect answer or running out of time results in the detonation of the bomb.

The bombs used on the show are made of fibreglass and polyester resin, and the liquid released is a moisture-absorbing polymer, dyed with food colouring. The liquid does not stain and can be washed off, while other international versions of the show use foodstuffs and require the audience to wear raincoats. When a wire signifying an incorrect answer is cut, an input is sent via radio to a computer and a solenoid valve releases compressed air, expelling the liquid.

== History ==
=== Origin ===
The original series Boom! was created by the Keshet Media Group and began airing on Israel's Channel 2 on 3 April 2014. It achieved an audience share of 41.2%, the highest for a game show in the country's history. Days later at the industry trade fair in Cannes, international channels such as Fox in the United States, TF1 in France and Antena 3 in Spain bought the rights to make adaptations. In July, Juanra Bonet was announced as the host in Spain.

In April 2016, Antena 3 staged a crossover with fellow game show ¡Ahora caigo!, resulting in Arturo Valls hosting ¡Boom! and Bonet presenting ¡Ahora caigo!. The crossover was staged again in October 2018.

=== Record winners ===
On 8 June 2016, the team RockCampers won a total of €2,326,500, when their earnings since their February debut were added to a €1.9 million jackpot. At that point, they had the highest game show earnings in Spanish history, suprassing the previous record of €2.19 million by Eduardo Benito on Pasapalabra in 2006.

In October 2018, the team Los Lobos received the world record for most consecutive wins on a game show (326), from Guinness World Records. Their run ended with 505 wins. Their run ended on 8 July 2019 by winning a jackpot of €4,130,000, which when added to their previous winnings totalled €6,689,700, another Guinness World Record for total game show earnings. Los Lobos were so popular with audiences that in order to avoid them leaving the show to receive their winnings and return to their day jobs, producers Gestmusic changed the convention and paid out 50% of their winnings 16 months into their streak on the show.

=== Cancellations and revivals ===
Bonet announced the end of ¡Boom! in September 2022, with the news being clarified that the final filming would be on 28 October but broadcasts would continue. The show disappeared from schedules on 24 October 2022 for magazine programme Y ahora Sonsoles, but returned the following March for weekend broadcasts. At the start of May, eight episodes into the 20 remaining from its original broadcast, it was definitively cancelled as its ratings fell from 8.2% to 6.3%.

In June 2024, Mediaset España bought the rights to ¡Boom! and assigned it to the channel Cuatro with Christian Gálvez as the new presenter. The final episode aired on 5 December, with an audience share of 3.8%, and the show was removed from schedules for the following week.
