= FIVB Volleyball Nations League =

FIVB Volleyball Nations League may refer to

- FIVB Men's Volleyball Nations League
- FIVB Women's Volleyball Nations League
