= FIVB World Championship =

FIVB World Championship may refer to

- FIVB Volleyball Men's World Championship
- FIVB Volleyball Women's World Championship
