= The Wheel (game show) =

UK game show

- Genre: Game show
- Created by: Michael McIntyre
- Presented by: Michael McIntyre
- Theme music composer: Paul Farrer
- Country of origin: United Kingdom
- Original language: English
- No. of series: 7
- No. of episodes: 69

Production
- Producers: Dan Baldwin; Tom Blakeson; Lisa Kirk; James Pratt; Simon Adsett
- Production location: ITV Studios Bovingdon
- Running time: 53–63 minutes
- Production company: Hungry McBear

Original release
- Network: BBC One
- Release: 28 November 2020 – present

The Wheel is a British television game show hosted by Michael McIntyre, broadcast on Saturday evenings on BBC One.

== Production ==
McIntyre explained that he first thought of ideas for The Wheel while taking a bath, envisioning the idea of a "human roulette wheel". He pondered that there had been "so many talent shows" on British television, but not many "brand new" game shows.

Seeking formats that could be easily produced under COVID-19 safety protocols such as social distancing (eased by design due to its large studio set at Bovingdon Airfield in Hertfordshire), the BBC picked up The Wheel as a de facto substitute for McIntyre's variety show series Michael McIntyre's Big Show (which was not feasible to produce due to its heavy reliance on live audience participation).

== Gameplay ==
=== Main game ===
Seven celebrities, each designated as an expert in a different subject, sit in chairs mounted on the outer edge of a 13-metre (43 ft) wide wheel on the main stage. They face in toward the centre, below which is a secondary stage where three contestants sit in chairs on a smaller wheel. This wheel is spun to choose a contestant at random, who is lifted up in their chair to the main stage.

In each round, the contestant chooses a subject, the seat of whose expert lights up gold, and also an expert to "shut down" – the one they believe is least likely to know about it, whose seat lights up red. The wheel is then spun to choose an expert at random; if it does not stop on the "shut-down" one, the host asks a question with four multiple-choice answers. The contestant may discuss it with the expert before answering; a correct response adds £10,000 to the bank if the subject expert was spun, or £3,000 otherwise. If the contestant misses a question or spins an expert who has been shut down, their turn ends and they are lowered back onto the smaller wheel, which is spun to choose a new contestant. Since the selection is random and all three contestants are always eligible to be chosen, it is possible for the same contestant to return to the game immediately after being dismissed. Each subject remains in play until a contestant correctly answers a question in it.

The other six experts also answer the question, using keypads to lock in their answers. If an expert misses a question in their own subject, whether or not they were spun for it, they are automatically shut down for the next round in addition to the expert chosen by the contestant. If all seven experts answer correctly (a "Perfect Wheel"), a bonus of £5,000 is added to the bank. When only one subject remains, the seats of all other experts who are not currently shut down and who have not been spun during the game turn silver, setting the question value at £6,000 if the wheel stops on any of them.

After all seven subjects have been used, the current contestant moves on to the final and has the first chance to win the bank.

==== Moneyspinner ====
Introduced in the second series, this round is played after the third question as a way to increase the bank. The host asks a question with at least seven answers (e.g. signs of the zodiac that contain the letter A), and the wheel begins to turn slowly through one complete rotation. Each expert must give an answer as they move past the pointer; the bank increases by £1,000 for each correct answer. A further £3,000 is added if all seven respond correctly, for a potential total increase of £10,000. If any expert gives an incorrect answer or fails to respond, the round ends immediately. The host announces the subject for the question at the start of this round, and the contestant decides which expert will answer first.

=== Final: Cashout ===
The experts are ranked by how many questions they have answered correctly during the game. The contestant may choose the best, middle ranking, or worst expert to assist them; these choices respectively set the prize at 50%, 100% or 200% of the banked total.

The wheel is spun to choose one of three new subjects, after which the host asks a question. The contestant may discuss it with the chosen expert for 30 seconds before locking in a response. A correct answer awards the money at stake to the contestant and ends the game. If the contestant answers incorrectly, they are eliminated from the game and a new contestant is chosen. The subject of the missed question, the expert chosen for it, and the prize associated with them are all removed from play. If the contestants fail to correctly answer questions with all three experts, all of them leave with nothing.

During the first two series, four subjects were available on the wheel, and those for missed questions were replaced. During the first four series, a contestant who missed a question remained eligible to be chosen again.

The maximum potential winnings total in series 1 is £210,000, achievable by correctly answering a question in all seven subjects with the help of the respective experts, achieving a Perfect Wheel on each of those turns, and giving a correct answer in the final with the worst expert. Beginning with series 2, the maximum is £230,000, requiring a correct answer from every expert in the Moneyspinner as well. In series 3, the final is referred to by Michael McIntyre as the Cashout.

=== Mechanics ===
The position at which the wheel stops after a spin is determined at random by a computer beforehand.

== Reception ==
Emily Baker of The i Paper gave a two-star review in 2020, criticising McIntyre as a host, and how eight questions were asked over the hour-long programme. In 2024, Rod Liddle of The Times criticised "the enforced jollity, the horrible music, the stupid questions and the still more stupid answers", but appreciated celebrity guest Harry Hill. Michael Hogan of The Daily Telegraph praised guest Joe Marler in 2025, shortly after the former rugby union player's appearance on The Celebrity Traitors; Hogan also said McIntyre presented "with nimble wit and an arched eyebrow, keeping proceedings just the right side of cheesy" and the production was "smartly put-together, skilfully paced, highly more-ish".

== Transmissions ==
Series	Episodes		Originally released	
Series	Episodes		First released	Last released
1	10	9	28 November 2020	23 January 2021
1	10	1	8 February 2022	8 February 2022
2	15	3	24 July 2021	7 August 2021
2	15	12	13 November 2021	29 January 2022
3	12	7	22 October 2022	25 December 2022
3	12	5	25 February 2023	25 March 2023
4	10	5	23 September 2023	21 October 2023
4	10	1	25 December 2023	25 December 2023
4	10	4	24 February 2024	16 March 2024
5	10		12 October 2024	21 December 2024
6	10		25 October 2025	25 December 2025
7	14		14 November 2026	TBA

== International versions ==
NBC announced in February 2021 that an American version with a ten-episode run had been ordered. It is produced by Warner Bros. Unscripted Television and Hungry McBear Media. In May 2021, it was announced that the show would premiere in the 2021–22 television season. In August 2021, an announcement was made that the show would premiere in 2022 with McIntyre as host. By May 2022 however, NBC indicated there would be a 2023 premiere, either midseason or summer. Eventually, the show premiered on 19 December 2022, with the first ten episodes airing in two weeks during the holiday season. In June 2023, after poor viewership figures, the series was cancelled after one season.

Country	Local name	Presenter	Channel	Broadcast
Finland	Tietäjät tietää	Roope Salminen	MTV3	1 September 2023 – 3 November 2023
France	The Wheel : Le Cercle des 7	Arthur	TF1	9 June 2023 – 30 June 2023
Germany	The Wheel – Promis drehen am Rad	Chris Tall	RTL	23 July 2021 – 19 June 2023
Netherlands	The Wheel	Rob Kemps	SBS6	11 September 2021 – 6 November 2021
Spain	El círculo de los famosos	Juanra Bonet	Antena 3	8 February 2023 – 29 March 2023
Spain	El círculo de los famosos	Arturo Valls	Antena 3	Upcoming
Sweden	Hjulet	Petra Mede	TV4	13 April 2022 – 1 June 2022
United States	The Wheel	Michael McIntyre	NBC	19 December 2022 – 30 December 2022
