= Juanra Bonet =

Spanish television presenter, actor and comedian

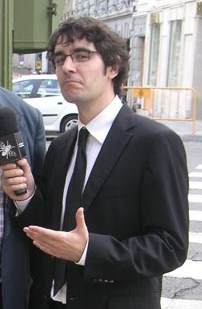
- Bonet in 2008
- Born: Juan Ramón Bonet Alba; 6 June 1974 (age 51); Barcelona, Catalonia, Spain
- Occupations: Actor; Television presenter; Comedian

Juan Ramón "Juanra" Bonet Alba (born 6 June 1974) is a Spanish television presenter, actor and comedian. He presented several game shows for Antena 3, with his longest run being ¡Boom! from 2014 to 2023.

== Early life and career ==
Bonet was born in Barcelona, and grew up in the Horta-Guinardó neighbourhood. After a chance meeting with a friend who was heading to an audition, he began training as an actor. He left his hometown in 2005, when he joined the cast of Telecinco's topical humour show Caiga quien caiga. In 2011, he toured performing Animales, an adaptation of Ricky Gervais's monologues Animals and Politics.

== Game show host ==
After presenting on La 2, Cuatro and La Sexta, Bonet signed a long-term contract with Antena 3 in July 2014, to present a new game show produced by Gestmusic. This show began in September, titled ¡Boom!, and was broadcast Monday to Friday, until it was cancelled on 21 October 2022 and replaced by the magazine show Y ahora Sonsoles. Several unaired episodes were aired at weekends in March and April 2023, though this run was not concluded due to low ratings.

Since 2019, Bonet has been a backstage reporter on La Voz and La Voz Kids, versions of The Voice for the same channel. Bonet received an Antena de Oro award in 2019.

In January 2020, Bonet hosted the revival of ¿Quién quiere ser millonario?, the Spanish version of Who Wants to Be a Millionaire?.

In early 2023, Bonet hosted El círculo de los famosos, the Spanish version of The Wheel, on Antena 3. The following year, on the same channel, he hosted Juego de pelotas, an adaptation of the Dutch concept De kwis met ballen. In 2025, he presented the second season of Traitors España.

In December 2025, it was announced that Bonet had rejoined Telecinco to host ¡Allá tú!, Spain's version of Deal or No Deal, replacing Jesús Vázquez.

== Game show contestant ==
In 2015, Bonet took part on Tu cara me suena, another Gestmusic show on Antena 3 franchised internationally as Your Face Sounds Familiar; he performed "Tainted Love" as Soft Cell's Marc Almond. He participated in the 11th season of the show in 2024.

In June 2020, Bonet participated in a special crossover episode of Pasapalabra against ¡Ahora caigo! host Arturo Valls. In March 2024, he participated in an episode of Generación TOP, a quiz show for teams of celebrities from different generations.
