= Peyman Yousefi =

Iranian football commentator, television presenter and producer

- Born: 24 January 1970 (age 56); Khoy, Iran
- Education: Master's degree of Biology
- Occupations: TV presenter, football commentator
- Years active: 1998–present
- Known for: Host of IRIB sports programs

Peyman Yousefi (Persian: پیمان یوسفی; born 24 January 1970 in Khoy, Iran) is an Iranian football commentator, television presenter and producer. He has a master's degree in biology.

== Personal life ==
He is originally from the city of Khoy in the province of West Azerbaijan. He is married and has a son. According to him, he has been following sports magazines such as Donyaye Varzesh and Keyhan Varzeshi since he was a child.

== Getting into reporting ==
Peyman Yousefi joined the IRIB Organization in 1998 and a year later made his first report on the 1999 FIFA World Youth Championship between Argentina and Colombia. He had a bad cold that day.

== Margins ==
=== Presence of women in stadiums ===
In 2017, while reporting on the Iran-Syria match, he saw pictures of Syrian women attending the Azadi Stadium. He spoke about the presence of women in the stadium. This comment caused him to be fired from hosting and reporting for a while, and because he was a regular participant in the Football Bartar program at the time, his vacancy was so palpable that people noticed this absence.

Seyyed Morteza Mirbagheri, Deputy Director of the Islamic Republic of Iran Broadcasting, regarding the rumored ban on the employment of Peyman Yousefi, regarding his comments on the presence of women in stadiums, said:

Peyman Yousefi is not banned from reporting and hosting. However, we have advised our executive friends to express their views based on national interests and the network and program in which they work. When we give a tribune to someone, that person has a specific mission, and if he wants to make a point without expert work, they do not consider the dimensions of this statement and what cost it creates for the network and the program. If people are going to comment on everything, it is unprofessional. Peyman Yousefi did unprofessional work, but it was not forbidden to be a reporter and presenter.

But his absence for some time from game reports and football programs reinforced the rumor.

=== Refers to the censorship of IRIB ===
In the match between Iran and Portugal in the 2018 FIFA World Cup in Russia; Peyman Yousefi said during the report:

"The fans in the stadium cheer for the national team and are full of excitement. They have not lost hope and still hopefully cheer for our national team, whether we see them or not!"

=== Reappearing on TV ===
Yousefi later returned to television to report the England-Slovenia match but was seen only as a reporter and was not given a video presence as a presenter. He finally resumed hosting a football program after a short time away from the camera.

=== Host of Varzesho Mardom ===
Varzesho Mardom program that has been produced and performed by Bahram Shafie for many years; Every Friday; It was broadcast on IRIB TV1, after the death of Bahram Shafie, it was handed over to Peyman Yousefi.
