= Mohammad Hossein Misaghi =

Iranian sports commentator

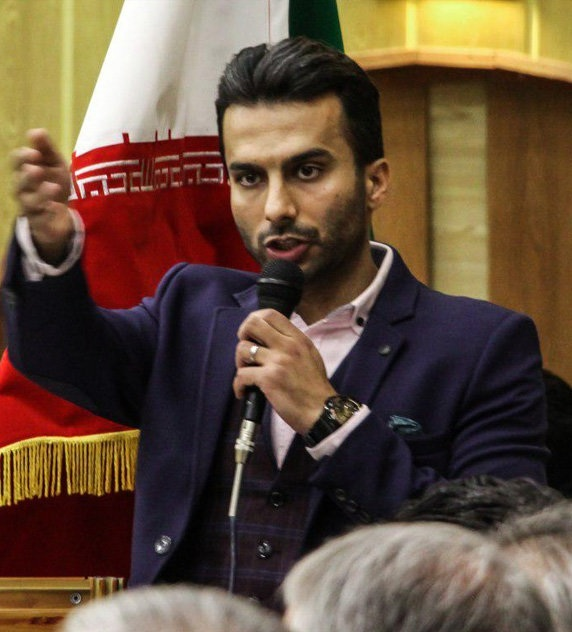
- Misaghi in 2017
- Born: 5 October 1986 (age 38); Karaj, Iran
- Education: Razi University, Kermanshah
- Occupation: Television sports commentator
- Employer: IRIB
- Children: 1

Mohammad Hossein Misaghi (Persian: محمدحسین میثاقی; born 5 October 1986) is an Iranian TV presenter. He is the host of the TV show Football Bartar (Premier Football in Persian). He was the host of the TV show Football 120, Bist Chahardah (meaning 2014, the special TV show of 2014 FIFA World Cup) and Asia 2019 (the special TV show of 2019 AFC Asian Cup) and he was the reporter of the TV show Navad (90, referencing the standard duration of an association football match). He won the Best Reporter of the Year award in the Seh Setareh (Three star) TV show in 2015, with close to 580,000 votes.
