= Javad Khiabani =

Iranian television presenter and reporter (born 1966)

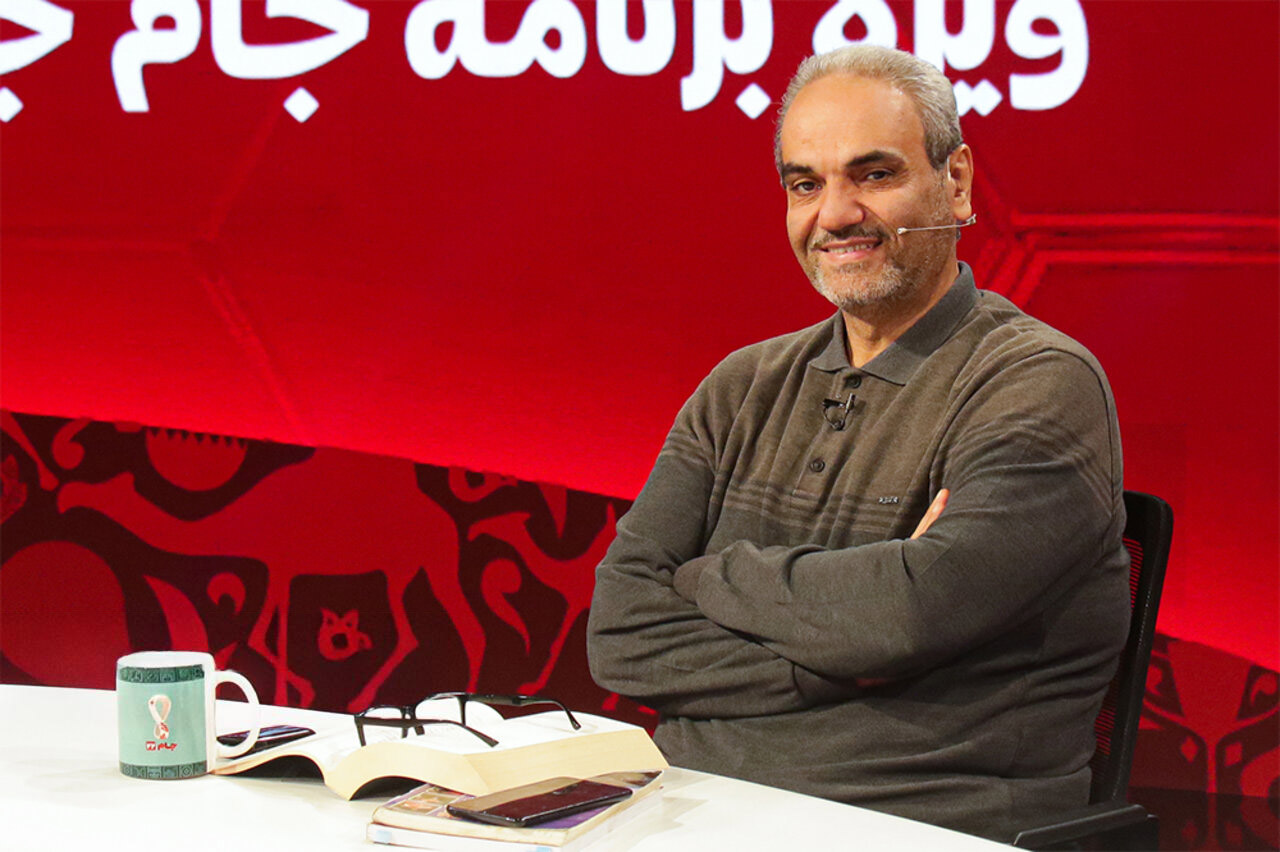
- Khiabani in 2020
- Born: October 29, 1966 (age 59); Karaj, Iran
- Occupation: Television sports commentator
- Employer: IRIB
- Height: 1.89 m (6 ft 2 in)

Mohammad Javad Khiabani (Persian: محمد جواد خیابانی ; born 28 October 1966) is an Iranian journalist, football commentator and television show host.

== Personal life ==
Khiabani's parents are from Zanjan. He is an alumnus of Shahid Rajaee Teacher Training University.
