= IRIB TV3 =

Iran TV channel 3

- Country: Iran
- Broadcast area: Middle East and North Africa
- Headquarters: Tehran

Programming
- Language: Persian
- Picture format: 16:9 (576i, SDTV) 16:9 (1080p, HDTV)

Ownership
- Owner: IRIB

History
- Launched: 4 December 1993

Links
- Website: www.tv3.ir

Availability

Terrestrial
- Jamaran: Ch47 Analog
- Jamaran: Ch37 Digital
- Jamaran: Ch31 Mobile
- Alvand: Ch22

Streaming media
- IRIB TV3 Live Streaming
- IRIB TV3 Live
- IRIB TV3 Live Stream

IRIB TV3 (Persian: شبکه سه, romanized: Shabakeh-ye Seh, lit. 'Channel Three') is one of the 32 national television channels in Iran.

It is the third television channel created by the Islamic Republic of Iran Broadcasting, and started broadcasting on 4 December 1993. The channel is often referred to as the youth channel, due to its large amounts of programming dedicated to sports. The channel broadcasts major Iranian sport events, mini-series, comedies, and movies (both foreign and domestic). On 7 August 2016, the channel's HD broadcast trial began in Tehran and provincial capitals.

== Programs ==
Programs in this channel mainly produce in 6 types:

- Entertainment
- Movie and Series
- Political
- Scientific
- Social and Economical
- Sport
- Cinema

== Popular programs ==
=== Programs that are currently broadcasting ===
- Football-e Bartar (2001–present)
- Gozareshe Varzeshi (2002–present)
- Samte Khoda (2009–present)

=== Programs that have finished broadcasting ===
- Inspector Rex
- Hallo, Onkel Doc!
- The Adventures of the Black Stallion
- Mardan Ahanin (1998–2018)
- Navad (1999–2019)
- After the Rain (2000)
- Khat-e Ghermez (2001)
- Zir-e Asmane Shahr 1 (2001)
- Zir-e Asmane Shahr 2 (2002)
- Noghtechin (2004)
- Tabe Sard (2004)
- Khane Be Doosh (2004)
- Shabhaye Barareh (2005–2006)
- Motaham Gorikht (2005)
- Nargess (2006)
- Zire Zamin (2006)
- Baghe Mozaffar (2006–2007)
- Mah-e Asal (2007–2018)
- Rahe Bipayan (2007)
- Char Khooneh (2007)
- Sweet and Sour (2007)
- Emperor of the Sea (2007–2008)
- Halgheye Sabz (2007–2008)
- Marde Hezar Chehreh (2008)
- Bezangah (2009)
- Marde Do Hezar Chehreh (2009)
- Jumong (2008–2009)
- Sherlock (2010–2019)
- Seven (2010–present)
- The Kingdom of the Winds (2010–2011)
- The Return of Iljimae (2011)
- Dong Yi (2012)
- Dozd va Police (2012)
- Bist Chahardah (2014)
- Kim Su-ro, The Iron King (2014)
- Three Stars (2014–2017)
- Moon Embracing the Sun (2015)
- Orange Spring (2015–2018)
- Hala Khorshid (2016–2019)
- Wall to Wall (2017)
- Be Winner (2018–2019)
- Bist Hejdah (2018)
- Shab Aram (2018–2019)
- New Era (2019–present)
- The Event (2020)
- The Last Wire (2020–2022)
