= Navad =

- Created by: Adel Ferdosipour
- Presented by: Bahador Amiri, Hamed Rastgoo, Nima Tajik, Mohammad Hossein Misaghi, Pedram Arab, Reza Younesian, Mohammad Hossein Ayoubian, Behzad Mokhtari, Navid Ostadrahimi
- Opening theme: Introduction
- Ending theme: Iran Pro League & Azadegan League Weekly Highlight
- Country of origin: Iran
- Original language: Persian
- No. of seasons: 20
- No. of episodes: 490

Production
- Camera setup: Multi-camera
- Running time: Mondays night and Sometimes Thursdays night (180 min)

Original release
- Network: IRIB TV3
- Release: 14 August 1999 – 11 March 2019

Navad (Persian: نود, meaning "ninety [minutes]") was a popular Iranian, Persian language weekly television programs broadcast by Channel 3 in Iran and hosted by Adel Ferdosipour. The program focused on the football matches played in the Persian Gulf Pro League every week.

Every episode typically featured two guests, one analyzing the technical aspects of the matches, and the other discussing the referee's decisions and errors. On some shows, famous football players were invited and interviewed as well. The show contained segments like "With the Legionnaires" (reporting on the Iranian footballers playing abroad), "Navad News" (the latest news about football in Iran) and polls (sometimes prediction of the upcoming matches) which could be contributed to via SMS or the Navad official app on iOS and Android.

Since the 2015-16 series, the analysis team of the program scores the players of Persian Gulf Pro League each week and overall, on the style of Kicker, from 1.00 (best) to 6.00 (worst).

Starting from the 2016–17 series, the Navad website launched a football manager online game, using live stats of the players contributing in the Iran Pro League, entitled Football Fantasy.

== The Controversial Cancellation of 90 ==
=== The Conflict Begins ===
In late 2018, tensions between Ali Foroughi, the newly appointed director of IRIB TV3, and renowned sports commentator Adel Ferdosipour came to a head. Speculation arose over the cancellation of Ferdosipour's popular sports show, "90," with many citing the director's alleged opposition to the program. Despite initial denials, a subsequent statement from IRIB TV3 confirmed that the show would not air due to the producer and host's "unprofessional behavior." This marked the beginning of a public feud that would have far-reaching consequences for Iranian sports broadcasting.

=== Public Backlash and Award ===
The decision to cancel "90" sparked widespread public outrage and support for Ferdosipour. In recognition of his work, Ferdosipour was awarded the Best Television Program award by a popular vote, a clear indication of the public's dissatisfaction with the decision to remove his show from the air. In his acceptance speech, Ferdosipour alluded to the challenges he had faced and thanked the audience for their support. Despite the award, however, the Iranian state broadcaster persisted in its decision to end the long-running program.

=== The End of an Era ===
In early 2019, the Iranian state broadcaster officially announced the permanent cancellation of "90." Ferdowsipour rejected offers to remain with the network in other capacities, stating that the show was like a child to him and that he could not abandon it. The cancellation of "90" was met with widespread condemnation from fans, media personalities, and the public at large. Subsequent efforts to reinstate the show were unsuccessful, and the program was eventually replaced with a new sports show. The conflict between Ferdowsipour and Foroughi became a symbol of the broader tensions between the Iranian government and its citizens, as well as the challenges faced by independent voices in the country's state-controlled media.
