= Pouria Zeraati =

Iranian-British journalist and reporter

- Born: 22 September 1987 (age 38); Babolsar, Mazandaran, Iran
- Education: Brunel University London
- Occupations: Journalist; columnist; author; television producer; newscaster; program host

Pouria Zeraati (Persian: پوریا زراعتی; born 22 September 1987) is an Iranian-British journalist and reporter for Iran International. In March 2024, Zeraati was hospitalized due to being stabbed by unidentified assailants upon leaving his London residence. Swedish member of parliament Alireza Akhondi, blamed the Islamic Revolutionary Guards Corps (IRGC).

== Career ==
Zeraati was born in Babolsar, Mazandaran. He received a degree in mechanical engineering from Brunel University London, then worked as a newsroom editor, host, and an announcer for the Manoto Network. He later joined the Iran International in 2020 as a producer and presenter of the program The Last Word.

== Attack ==
=== Background ===
In December 2021, British ITV news channel reported in an exclusive report that "Iranian spies" had ordered a "human trafficker" in exchange for the payment of 200 thousand dollars, to terrorize IITV presenters Sima Thabit and Fardad Farahzad.

In February 2023, amidst the Mahsa Amini protests, Iran International reported about the threats from the Revolutionary Guards against its journalists.

=== Stabbing ===
On 30 March 2024, upon leaving his London residence, Pouria Zeraati was attacked by some unidentified assailants, stabbing him in the leg. Iran International announced that he is hospitalized and his condition is stable.

=== Reactions ===
The attack was widely condemned by Iranian and international celebrities, journalists and media, political activists, human rights defenders and social media users, and was reflected in British and world media. After the news of the attack on Zeraati, a number of Iran International audiences condemned the attack and wished him well. Protesters of the attack wrote slogans on the wall next to a street in Tehran against the Islamic Republic and in support of Pouria Zeraati and Sara Tabrizi. Notable figures stated:

- Alicia Kearns, Chair of the British Parliament's Foreign Affairs Committee, said: "It is with great sadness that Iran International has had to close its UK office for a short period of time and has recently started broadcasting live from London. While we do not know the circumstances of this attack, Iran continues to pursue those who have the courage to speak against it. However, I am not convinced that we and our allies have clear strategies to protect people in our countries from them (the Iranian regime) and to protect our interests abroad."
- The National Union of Journalists of Great Britain and Ireland called it "shocking" in a statement. Michelle Stanistreet, General Secretary of the NUJ, said: "The systematic targeting of journalists simply for doing their jobs must stop. "The international community should increase the pressure on Iran and the United Nations should hold Iran accountable for its actions."
- Hamed Esmaeilion called this act brutal and wrote: "The horrific news of an Iranian journalist stabbed in London this morning is outrageous. I wish a speedy recovery for Mr. Pouria Zeraati and his return to work. Hopefully the London Police will find the perpetrators of this crime and those behind it. A free press is one of the pillars of democracy, it is sad to see these heinous acts happen in the free world."
- Masih Alinejad wrote: "I am deeply disturbed by the cowardly assault on my friend Pouria Zeerati, an Iranian journalist in London. Pouria was stabbed near his residence in London; as the host of Iran International’s Last Word show, he sustained multiple knife wounds and has been hospitalized. He is a brave journalist who has dedicated his life to expose Islamic Republic’s crimes and acts of terrorism. My thoughts are with him and his family during this difficult time for the international governments to take Islamic Republic threats, seriously and criminalize transnational repression. I strongly urge the London police to conduct a thorough investigation into this appalling attack. It is alarming to note that journalists from [Iran] International TV have been subjected to ongoing threats from the Islamic Republic. We must unite in condemning such senseless acts of aggression."
- Nazanin Boniadi, human rights activist: "Horrified to learn that my friend, prominent Iranian journalist Pouria Zeraati was stabbed outside his home in London. While we wait for an investigation, I hope the Met Police takes the threats by the Islamic Republic to kill Iranian journalists in exile seriously."
- Alireza Akhondi, an Iranian representative of the Swedish Parliament: "One of the most prominent Iranian journalists, Pouria Zeraati has been viciously attacked with a knife in London. Let me be unequivocal: this heinous act reeks of #IRGCterrorists and the unmistakable hand of the Islamic regime. I demand swift and transparent action from the British government to apprehend the culprits and safeguard other fearless Iranian opposition voices."
- Nazanin Afshin-Jam, human rights activist: "How many more assassination plots before the UK, Canada, Australia and countries in the EU will list the IRGC on the terrorist list? #IRGCterrorists"

== See also ==
- Human rights in the Islamic Republic of Iran
- Iranian influence operations in the UK
- Masih Alinejad
- Ruhollah Zam
- Transnational repression
