= Islamic Centre =

Islamic Centre may refer to:

- Islamic Centre of England
- Islamic Centre (Maldives)
