= Hattrick (TV program) =

- Genre: Iranian football highlights and analysis
- Created by: Mazdak Mirzaei
- Presented by: Mazdak Mirzaei
- Starring: Analyst: Mohammad Taghavi; Assistant presenter: Zahra Alipour
- Narrated by: Mazdak Mirzaei; Mohammad Taghavi; Zahra Alipour; Reza Mohadeth; Alireza Modiri; Arash Bahmani; Ehsan Akbari
- Opening theme: Hattrick theme
- Country of origin: United Kingdom
- Original language: Persian
- No. of seasons: 1
- No. of episodes: 8

Production
- Producer: Mazdak Mirzaei
- Production locations: Iran International Studios, London, United Kingdom
- Camera setup: Multi-camera
- Running time: 85 minutes
- Production company: Iran International Sport

Original release
- Network: Iran International
- Release: 7 December 2019 – present

Hattrick (Persian: هت‌تریک) is an Iranian football live television program, broadcast every Saturday night from Iran International. The founder, presenter and producer of the program is Mazdak Mirzaei and program Analyst Mohammad Taghavi and assistant presenter is Zahra Alipour.

Hattrick uses British refereeing experts to examine the refereeing scenes of Iranian football matches.

== History ==
Hattrick program was founded in 2019 by Mazdak Mirzaei. The first episode of the Hattrick program aired on 7 December 2019.

== Seasons information ==
Season	Date and time of broadcast	Start season	End season	Number of episodes broadcast	Episode range	TV season	TV channel
1	Saturday 22:00	7 December 2019		8	1–	2019–2020	Iran International

== See also ==
- Mazdak Mirzaei
- Iran International
