= Iran International =

UK-based Persian-language TV station

- English-language home page of Iran International on 30 July 2026
- Country: United Kingdom
- Broadcast area: Worldwide
- Headquarters: London

Programming
- Languages: Persian, English, Arabic
- Picture format: 1080i (HDTV)

Ownership
- Owner: Volant Media UK Ltd
- Sister channels: Afghanistan International

History
- Launched: 19 May 2017; 9 years ago

Links
- Webcast: www.iranintl.com/live
- Website: iranintl.com

Radio Iran International
- Frequency: 15630 kHz / 5830 kHz SW

Iran International (Persian: ایران اینترنشنال, romanized: Irān Internašnāl) is a Persian-language satellite television channel and multilingual digital news operation established in 2017 and based in London, United Kingdom. Iran International has been backed by Saudi-linked private investors, and media reports have alleged that figures connected to the Saudi royal court were involved in its financing, while the agency denies receiving funding from or having ties to the Saudi government. Iran International actively promotes former Crown Prince Reza Pahlavi as the next ruler of Iran. It is aimed at Iranians and people interested in Iranian news, culture, politics, society and sports. Iran designated the organisation as a terror organisation in 2022, alleging that it incited anti-government protests after the death of Mahsa Amini.

News content is available online, via radio and via satellite broadcasting worldwide including inside Iran despite official attempts at censorship. The network reports on Iran's geopolitical role, economy, human rights violations, political developments, LGBTQ+ rights and other topics sensitive to the Government of Iran.

Despite satellite signal jamming by the Iranian government, Iran International has an audience of around 20 million people. The network primarily focuses on news coverage and current affairs, but it also broadcasts programs and documentaries on science, arts, technology, sports, and culture.

Its flagship news and analysis programs include 24 with Fardad Farahzad, Titr-e Aval with Niusha Saremi (previously hosted by Fardad Farahzad), and Cheshmandaz with Mehdi Mahdavi Azad (formerly Cheshmandaz with Sima Sabet). Among its cultural, artistic, and sports programs are Panjereh, Tanin Tarikh hosted by Abdollah Abdi, and Hat-Trick hosted by Mazdak Mirzaei.

Iranian authorities classified various Persian-language media outlets operating outside the country including Iran International as part of their “military target bank” during the 2026 Iran war.

== History ==
Iran International was launched on 18 May 2017. According to UK corporate records and sources "familiar with the channel", it was funded and started by members of the Saudi royal court circle. Its stated aims are to deliver world news to the inhabitants of Iran, to provide the global Iranian diaspora with "a fair and balanced view of what happens inside Iran", and to connect the two audiences. The scholar of the Middle East Elisheva Machlis placed the channel's establishment within the context of "a Saudi effort to gain influence inside Iran", and its former Washington correspondent Negar Mortazavi related the initiative to an expensive Saudi push for "influence and credibility". Iran International is headquartered in London and broadcasts internationally, with a team of journalists that have joined from other Persian-language news channels, including Manoto, Radio Farda, BBC Persian Service and Voice of America. It has bureaus in Istanbul, Paris and Washington D.C.

Iran International broadcasts via the TürkmenÄlem 52°E / MonacoSAT satellite to a wide region of Europe and Asia (including Iran), and also transmits an audio relay of it receivable in Iran via shortwave radio (SW). It also broadcasts worldwide via online streaming through its website or streaming apps. It is licensed in the United Kingdom to Global Media Circulating Ltd as an editorial news service based in London and is managed by DMA Media Ltd, which has bureaus in Paris, Istanbul, Kabul and Washington. Volant Media UK launched a sister channel in 2021, Afghanistan International.

In 2018 Iran's ambassador to the UK lodged a complaint to the media regulator because of Iran International's interview with a separatist group spokesman after they claimed responsibility for a terrorist attack on a military parade in Ahvaz in Khuzestan Province, killing 25 civilians and military. The channel aired an interview with Yaqoub Hor Altostari, presented as a spokesman for the group, indirectly claiming responsibility for the attack and calling it "resistance against legitimate targets". After a long investigation Ofcom ruled that Iran International did not breach any rules. In 2021, Iran International leaked an interview given by Iran's then foreign minister, Javad Zarif; Iran's foreign ministry said leak had been distorted through selective quotations.

=== Mahsa Amini protests ===
On 9 November 2022, among the Mahsa Amini protests, the Iranian Minister of Intelligence Ismail Khatib announced that Iran International has been declared a terrorist organisation by the Islamic Republic of Iran for supposedly inciting the anti-government riots. Any cooperation with the channel will be considered an act of cooperation with terrorists and a threat to national security. In response to Iranian government castigation, Iran International deemed it needed to increase security in order to protect its London staff from threats emanating from Tehran. These bulwarks have included concrete barriers "guaranteed to stop a 7.5 ton truck at 50 miles (80 kilometers) per hour," taking the lead from the way the UK government uses such barriers to defend against vehicular onslaughts, which vehicles are now monitored through checkpoints.

Eventually, on 18 February 2023, after a significant escalation in state-backed threats from Iran and advice from the Metropolitan Police, Iran International TV said it had reluctantly closed its London studios temporarily and moved broadcasting to Washington, D.C. Operations resumed at a new location in London in September 2023.

When Iran and Saudi Arabia re-established diplomatic relations in Beijing in March 2023, Saudi Arabia was reported to have agreed to tone down the coverage of the Mahsa Amini protests on the Iran International channel, or even to stop funding it, as part of the deal.

In February 2023 Magomed-Husejn Dovtaev was charged with terrorism after being caught photographing areas surrounding the London studios, and in September Iran International said it was resuming broadcasting from London, UK. Dovtaev was found guilty and sentenced to 3 ^{1}/_{2} years in jail.

The Handala group infiltrated the internal systems and data of Iran International in July 2025. Iran International confirmed the authenticity of the leaked data in a statement. The group said it had published information on more than 71,000 users, employees, financial records, contracts and internal messages of the network. In total, the volume of the leaked data is said to have exceeded 2 terabytes. The Handala group is linked to the Iranian intelligence, according to Iran International.

== Programming ==
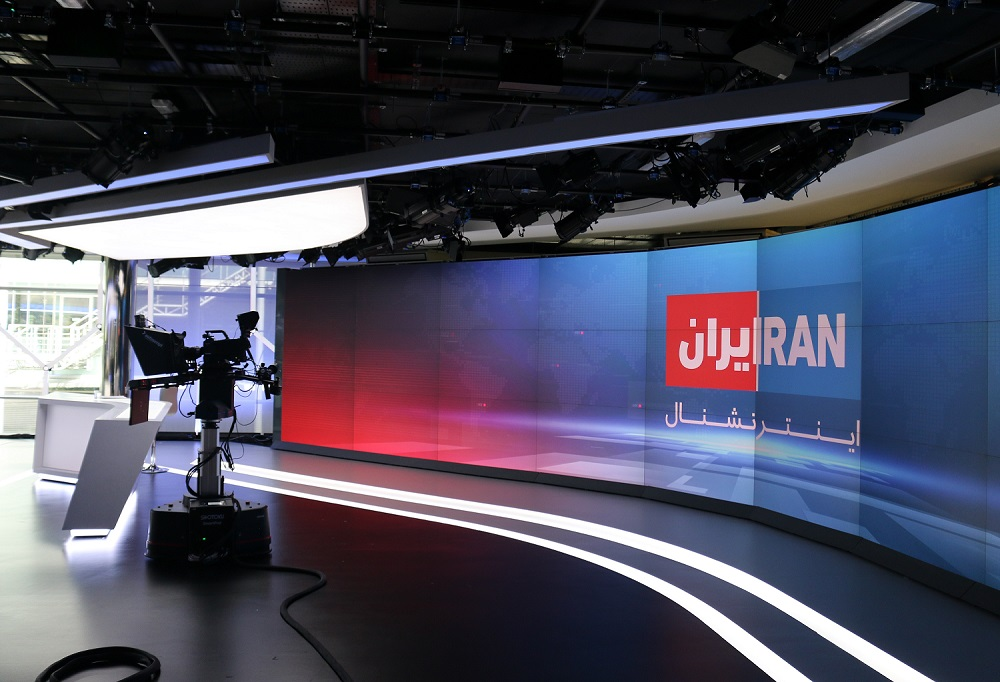
Iran International studio in London

According to Middle East Eye, Iran International is a media platform for the Iranian opposition. Kourosh Ziabari of Al-Monitor wrote it "does not shy away from presenting itself as an opposition media organization" and frequently gives the microphone to guests who criticise the Iranian government. The channel has been referred to as an "Iranian exile news outlet" by Borzou Daragahi of The Independent.

The channel is known for raising the profile of Reza Pahlavi, the last heir apparent to the former Iranian throne, and establishing him as a potential leader of Iran by constant coverage and repeatedly interviewing him. It also airs coverage of People's Mujahedin of Iran (MEK), including live broadcast of their rallies. Following the Twelve-Day War of June 2025, it conducted a series of interviews with top Israeli politicians, including Benjamin Netanyahu, Benny Gantz and Yair Lapid.

The claim of responsibility for the Ahvaz military parade attack was made through Iran International. In 2020, the TV broadcast performance of Iranian singers who were flown in from the United States to the Winter at Tantora Festival. In 2018, Iran International was not running television advertisements; by 2026, it was running advertisements that promote Reza Pahlavi.

=== News output ===
Iran International relies on a team of journalists around the world and reports on current affairs, health, technology, human rights violations, LGBTQ+ rights, women's rights and more. The channel has reported extensively on the COVID-19 pandemic in Iran, the Iran Nuclear Deal and global politics.

Iran International broadcasts via the TürkmenÄlem 52°E / MonacoSAT.

The channel also airs television shows on sport, culture and politics and has produced documentaries that have been nominated for awards by the Association for International Broadcasters.

=== Exclusive stories ===
Iran International reported exclusively on the extension of Nazanin Zaghari-Ratcliffe's furlough, and her partner Richard Ratcliffe has been a guest on the channel multiple times. The channel was also the first to report that Iranian rapper Amir Tataloo was facing deportation back to Iran from Turkey, and the sentencing of The Salesman star Taraneh Alidoosti.

During the COVID-19 pandemic in Iran, the channel published exclusive documents pertaining to alleged high level government corruption concerning COVID-19 medical supplies, with The Independent writing that the documents "purported to show how Iran regime figures intervened in the procurement of medical supplies to steer South Korean contracts for Covid-19 test-kits through shell companies towards conservative foundations controlled by cronies".

Reporting on the execution of Navid Afkari, Iran International exclusively interviewed Amnesty International's Iran Researcher and human rights lawyer Raha Bahreini, who told the channel that "with the secret and previously unannounced execution of Navid Afkari, the Islamic Republic authorities once again showed the ruthless and merciless of Iran's judiciary system at the international level".

=== Human rights ===
In June 2020, Iran International reported on a series of honour killings and gender-based violence that took place in Iran, with legal analyst and journalist at Iran International Nargess Tavalossian, the daughter of Nobel Prize winning activist Shirin Ebadi, speaking publicly to global media outlets about the increase in violence against women in the country.

=== Popularity ===
Iran International's news and analysis have been cited in Western media publications including BBC News, The Guardian, The Sydney Morning Herald, The Telegraph, Fox News, and The Independent. Staff at Iran International have also appeared as experts on BBC Radio 4, Sky News, Australian Broadcasting Corporation networks and ITN.

In 2021, an online survey carried out by the Netherlands-based non-profit the Group for Analyzing and Measuring Attitudes in Iran (GAMAAN) found Iran International was the most popular television channel among respondents, with 33% reporting daily viewership. More than half of the participants surveyed reported that they trusted Iran International "a lot" or "to some extent".

In 2023, another online opt-in survey carried out by GAMAAN reported 54% of respondents "sometimes" or "often" listened to or watched Iran International. GAMAAN's poll was primarily distributed through U.S. government-funded VPN platforms Psiphon and Lantern, as well as social media and encrypted messaging platforms. It found that Iran International's most popular programs were the "Cheshmandaz Talk Show, with Sima Sabet," its various documentaries, and "24, with Fardad Farahzad." Half of the individuals surveyed also said they trusted Iran International "a lot" or "to some extent". GAMAAN states its survey results are generalisable to the broader population of "literate individuals above 19 years old residing in Iran". The 2023 survey's sample of 38,445 respondents inside Iran is disproportionately male, urban, and university-educated compared to the general population in Iran, which GAMAAN sought to adjust for with statistical weighting methods.

Another UK-based Persian TV outlet, Manoto, received similarly high levels of trust from respondents to GAMAAN's 2023 survey, and was second in viewership, with about 42% of respondents "sometimes" or "often" viewing or listening to Manoto programming. But in 2024, Manoto shut down its satellite broadcasting due to financial issues. Manoto still operates via YouTube, Twitter, and Facebook. BBC Persian was in third, with 37.3% of survey participants "sometimes" or "often" tuning in.

=== Awards ===
Iran International has twice been nominated for International Channel of the Year by the Association for International Broadcasting and won a 2023 Clio Entertainment Award as well as a 2023 Promax UK award.

== Staff ==
The head of TV is Mahmood Enayat, and the Director of News is Aliasghar Ramezanpour, who was the deputy Minister of Culture of Iran under former president Mohammad Khatami. In July 2019, Iranian media reporter Mazdak Mirzaei, a football commentator and TV host joined Iran International. Mirzaei had worked for IRIB on the weekly TV sports program Navad, that was suspended by the new head of IRIB 3 in March 2019.

In May 2020, Iran International senior journalist Omid Habibinia joined the team. In September 2021, Iran International journalist Tajuden Soroush published several reports on Afghanistan following the 15 August 2021 fall of Kabul.

Iran International is banned in Iran and it has no reporters inside Iran.

=== Union busting ===
Michelle Stanistreet, general secretary of National Union of Journalists (NUJ) told Press Gazette "[o]ur members at Iran International have faced intimidation and harassment for their work as journalists —that their rights of freedom of association should be trampled on in this way is a grave injustice and one that the NUJ will do all it can to rectify".

On 10 July 2020, International Federation of Journalists (IFJ) released a statement and condemned union busting efforts made by Iran International, its refusal to engage with the UK government's non-departmental public body Acas to recognise a NUJ chapel, as well as what it called a "breach of international labour standards". Iran International had signed a recognition deal with the British Association of Journalists (BAJ), which IFJ describes as a "sweetheart deal" with an "obscure journalists' union", and appointed a senior manager to represent staff while pressuring them to join BAJ. NUJ stated that BAJ had no members there before the deal was made. As of July 2020, BAJ claimed 20 members working at Iran International while NUJ said an "overwhelming majority" of the 140 workers are its members.

On 15 July 2020, it was reported that Labour peer Lord John Hendy submitted a complaint to International Labour Organization (ILO) against the BAJ and Iran International.

=== Intimidation of staff ===
Iran's Ministry of Intelligence had previously named the employees of Iran International as "enemy of the state", writing on its website that those who "serve foreigners" and "betray the country" will be punished. The same publication wrote in May 2020 that Iran International is thought to be the target of a state-sponsored programme that "has sought to discredit its reporting and trace its followers" by creating replicas of its social media accounts. Instagram was criticised for hosting the fake accounts. In December 2019, Shanti Das of The Times reported that the Iranian government was waging an "intimidation campaign" against personnel of the TV station, freezing their assets, interrogating their relatives and "threatening to snatch them from British streets if they do not quit their jobs".

In 2022, London's Metropolitan Police placed concrete barriers outside the company's studios in west London as a response to "imminent and credible threats".

In February 2023, Iran International moved its headquarters temporarily to Washington, D.C. due to increased threats from the Iranian government against Iran International's UK-based journalists. Scotland Yard warned Iran International staff that it could not "safeguard them from Tehran-backed assassins or kidnappers on UK soil". Magomed-Husekjn Dovtaev was charged in 2023 with terrorism after he was found collecting information outside the channel's headquarters. Dovtaev was charged "with collecting information of a kind likely to be useful to a person committing or preparing an act of terrorism".

In March 2024, journalist Pouria Zeraati, was stabbed outside his home in London. He later relocated to Israel for safety reasons. Aram Bolandpaz, who is an LGBTQ+ activist, reported being threatened by the Iranian government.

== Ownership and funding ==
Iran International is owned by Volant Media UK Ltd, a company based in London owned by a Saudi Arabian–British citizen. The channel is backed by a "Saudi-British investor with ties to the Saudi government". According to The Guardian, Saudi Arabia has provided a 250-million-dollar fund for Iran International in 2018, but Iran International's management claims the independence of its editorial operation and denies a link to any government.

It is licensed in the United Kingdom to Global Media Circulating Ltd as an editorial news service based in London and is managed by DMA Media Ltd, which has bureaus in Paris, Istanbul, Kabul and Washington. Volant Media UK launched a sister channel in 2021, Afghanistan International following the Taliban's capture of Kabul.

Corporate documents for Volant Media shows that another Saudi national, Fahad Ibrahim Aldeghither, was the major shareholder of Volant Media before Adel Abdukarim. Aldeghither owned over 75% of the shares of Volant Media from May 2016 to May 2018. Fahad Ibrahim Aldeghither was the chairman of Mobile Telecommunication Company Saudi Arabia (Zain) from March 2013 to February 2016. Zain Saudi is the third-largest telecoms provider in Saudi Arabia.

Iran International operates at a financial loss, leading to suspicions of being supported by a government. Iran International's budget decreased in 2023, coinciding with Saudi-Iran rapprochement.

== Political positions and controversies ==
Iran International has been accused of promoting Saudi interests, and serving as a political platform of former Iranian Crown Prince Reza Pahlavi. In response, Iran International states it "adheres to strict international standards of impartiality, balance and accountability". The Guardian reported that Iran International is funded by a Saudi businessman with close ties to Saudi Crown Prince Mohammed bin Salman, raising questions about its editorial independence. Iran International denied being funded by any government, but acknowledged it was "owned by a Saudi Arabian–British citizen".

=== Promotion of Reza Pahlavi ===
Iran International actively promotes former Crown Prince Reza Pahlavi, and BBC Monitoring has identified several senior Iran International journalists who back Pahlavi. Bloomberg News identifies Iran International as "explicitly monarchist".

Professor Lior Sternfeld has argued that Iran International has played a "central role" in promoting the image of Reza Pahlavi as Iran's next leader. Iran International's editorial line is "to improve Reza's image". Iran International says it runs Pahlavi ads “on a pro bono basis”. The channel also airs QR codes that call for Iranian security forces to defect to Pahlavi. Mehrdad Emami writes in Jadaliyya that Iran International serves as the political platform for the Iranian monarchism movement. Mehdi Salehi writes that Iran International "blurs the line between journalism and political agitation".

During the 2025–2026 Iranian protests, Iran International misrepresented anti-Islamic Republic sentiment as pro-monarchist sentiment, according to The New Arab.

=== Alleged promotion of Saudi interests ===
The Guardian reported that Iran International's funding was linked to Saudi Prince Mohammed bin Salman. According to the report, Iran International received $250 million from Saudi Arabia for launching the channel. The report also said that the editorial content had been influenced by its investors.

According to The Wall Street Journal, "some journalists at Iran International have complained that management is pushing a pro-Saudi, anti-Islamic Republic line". WSJ quoted a former correspondent at the TV station commenting that "a systematic and very persistent push" was made during her time there. Azadeh Moaveni of New York University has charged the channel is an arm of Saudi Arabia: "I would not describe Iran International as pro-reform, or organically Iranian in any manner". Historian Lior Sternfeld stated, "Just as Al-Jazeera promotes Qatari interests, so does this channel promote Saudi interests regarding Iran", while noting a softening in Mohammed bin Salman's attitude towards Iran from around 2021. Another scholar, Eskandar Sadeghi-Boroujerdi, claimed in an interview with the Jacobin magazine that the channel was backed by Israel as of 2026.

Iran International's management denied links to any governments. Its spokesperson said to the CNN, "We have heard these accusations before most often promoted by those in whose interests it is to deny a free press."

=== Alleged pro-Israeli bias ===
Bloomberg News identifies Iran International as a "pro-Israel broadcaster". Professor Nahid Siamdoust of the University of Texas at Austin writes that Iran International, among others, weaponised the Woman, Life, Freedom movement to support Israeli military attacks on Iran. According to Siamdoust, Iran International presents Israel as "the savior of Iranian women".

In 2023, Iran International journalists met with the Israeli Minister of Intelligence. A report by The New Arab stated that when Iran International leaked Mahsa Amini's medical records, it received from a hack group with alleged ties to the Israeli intelligence. Iranian state media has referred to Iran International as the “psychological operations arm of the Israeli Ministry of War.”

During the Gaza war, according to The New Arab, Iran International took a pro-Israeli stance, and some of its journalists justified Israeli attacks on Palestinian civilians.

During the Twelve-Day War, Iran International's host Pouria Zeraati, interviewed Israeli PM Benjamin Netanyahu. During the interview, Netanyahu said to Zeraati, "I respect you, I admire you." Iran International also reported from inside an Iron Dome base, and interviewed an Israeli commander.

Armin Messager writes Iran International propagates anti-Palestinian sentiment arguing that Gaza and Lebanon have "stolen" Iran's wealth.

On 7 October 2024, an Iran International correspondent in Israel, Babak Eshaghi, was videotaped writing the saying "Woman, Life, Freedom" on the walls of a destroyed building in the besieged Gaza Strip. The saying originated with the Kurdish freedom movement in Iraq, Turkey and Syria; it was later revived as an international slogan in support of women's rights following global protests in 2022 and 2023 against the mistreatment and murder of Mahsa Jina Amini.

=== Alleged 2024 Armenia–Iran arms deal ===
In July 2024, Iran International reported on a secret $500 million agreement between Iran and Armenia by citing a "senior military official in the Middle East." The supposed deal was reported to have included Shahed 136, Shahed 129, Shahed 197, and Mohajer drones and air defence systems such as 3rd Khordad, Majid, 15th Khordad, and Arman. It further reportedly involved intelligence cooperation, close military relations, training, and the establishment of bases on Armenian soil.

The report was denied by Armenia's Defense Ministry as "fictitious and false". Mehdi Sobhani, Iran's ambassador in Armenia, also denied the report, calling the outlet "unreliable" and having a "history of publishing incorrect information and biased analyses about the Islamic Republic of Iran." Sobhani said the "purpose of publishing such news is to influence the development of friendly relations between Iran and the countries of the region and emphasized that the Islamic Republic of Iran supports the establishment of peace and stability as well as economic development in the Caucasus region." Azerbaijani pro-government media also denied the report calling it "entirely fabricated" and aimed at "sabotaging the burgeoning relationship between Azerbaijan and Iran by spreading false information."

== See also ==
- Mass media in Iran
