= Islamic Centre of England =

Religious and cultural building in Maida Vale, London

Coordinates: 51°32′7″N 0°11′21″W

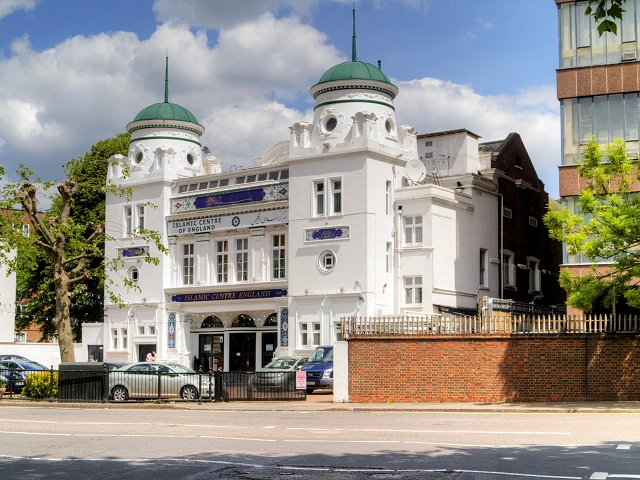
Islamic Centre of England

The Islamic Centre of England Ltd (ICEL) is a religious and cultural institution allegedly linked to the Iranian government at 140 Maida Vale, London, whose mission is "to provide services to members of the Muslim community, in particular, and the wider community at large", focusing on religious guidance and cultural issues. It was founded in December 1995 and opened officially in November 1998. The premises are a former cinema that is a listed building.

The institute is alleged to be a mouthpiece of the Islamic Republic of Iran.

== Operation ==
The centre was founded in 1995 under the supervision of Ayatollah Mohsen Araki, who was its first director, and opened officially in November 1998. It describes itself as an educational centre for those who wish to increase their knowledge of Islamic principles and cultural values and therefore, helping to strengthen the social structure of the community. In addition to religious services, the centre provides counselling and support in all areas of family life.

The centre is run as a UK Private company limited by guarantee as Islamic Centre of England Limited. Its Governing Document requires that at all times one trustee be a representative of the Supreme Leader of Iran. The financial accounts filed at Companies House show that as 31 December 2016 the company has reserves (i.e. money in the bank or quickly accessible) of £4.4M; and that during the year grants were passed to Islamic centres in Glasgow, Cardiff, Birmingham, Manchester, Newcastle and Leeds. Propagation of Islam is the main activity.

The Islamic Centre of England has a daily congregation of 50-100 people. It is open 365 days a year and holds programmes in English, Arabic, Persian and Urdu.

The centre is led by 3 directors, one of whom is a woman. Abdul Hussein Mo'ezzi is a former director and imam.

A representative of the church was involved with Benedictine-Shia inter-religious dialogue in 2017, and another presided over a Christian Muslim Forum that year. On 18 February 2018, the centre participated in the Visit My Mosque open day.

== Controversy ==
In January 2020 the trustees of the Centre allowed a candlelit vigil to be held at its premises in response to the assassination of Iranian Major General Qasem Soleimani, who was subject to financial sanctions by HM Treasury for terrorism and/or terrorist financing. Further investigation found that the mosque had provided a platform for speakers who publicly supported Iranian backed violence in the Middle East. This led the Charity Commission to issue an Official Warning under section 75A of the Charities Act 2011 to the Islamic Centre, regarding misconduct and/or mismanagement.

In 22 November 2022 the Charity Commission opened a statutory inquiry into the Islamic Centre of England Limited over serious governance concerns. The inquiry will examine amongst others the governance and administration of the charity by the trustees, including the identification and management of conflicts of interest and/or loyalty.

On Wednesday, 24 May 2023, the centre was closed, pending further investigation by the Charity Commission. It has long been accused of being a mouthpiece of the Iranian government. Various public investigations allegedly found evidence that the centre had been used as a base to harass dissidents and critics in the United Kingdom.

In July 2023, the centre was reopened, following its compliance with several insurance requirements while the Charity Commission's inquiry continued.

== Building ==
The centre is housed in the former Maida Vale Picture House, a 1,001-seat cinema designed by Edward A. Stone (one of his earliest works) which opened as the Picture Palace on 27 January 1913. The building has two copper-topped towers and a central dome; the auditorium, with oak walls decorated with gilded plaster, originally had a small circle with curtained boxes, and an entrance vestibule with a marble floor and an open fire, with a tearoom above it. Provincial Cinematograph Theatres acquired it in 1920 and renamed it the Picture House in 1923. It was in turn acquired in 1927 by Associated Provincial Picture Houses, who reopened it that September with a new organ, and in 1929 by Gaumont British Theatres, who closed it in November 1940 because of the Second World War. In 1949, after alterations, it was reopened by Mecca Dancing as the Carlton Rooms, a ballroom which was the location of BBC dancing broadcasts. It was converted again into a bingo club in 1961 and became a Grade II listed building in 1991. Jasmine Bingo, the then operator, closed it in 1996.

== Islamic College and Seminary ==
The centre is also linked to two educational establishments at 133 High Road, Willesden, London.

- The Islamic College, (a company registered as the Islamic College for Advanced Studies)
- Hawza Ilmiyya of England, an Islamic seminary

Mohammad Ali Shomali, Imam of the Centre since 2014, in November 2016 at Hawza Ilmiyya appointed as Internal Manager Mirza Mohammed Abbas Raza, who then became sole Director of the Islamic College in November 2017.

== Publications ==
The Islamic Centre of England publishes Islam Today, a monthly magazine and jointly publishes Message of Thaqalayn, a scholarly journal, with a publisher in Qom, Iran.

== See also ==
- Islam in England
- Iranian influence operations in the UK
- List of mosques in England
