= Mazdak Mirzaei =

Iranian television presenter

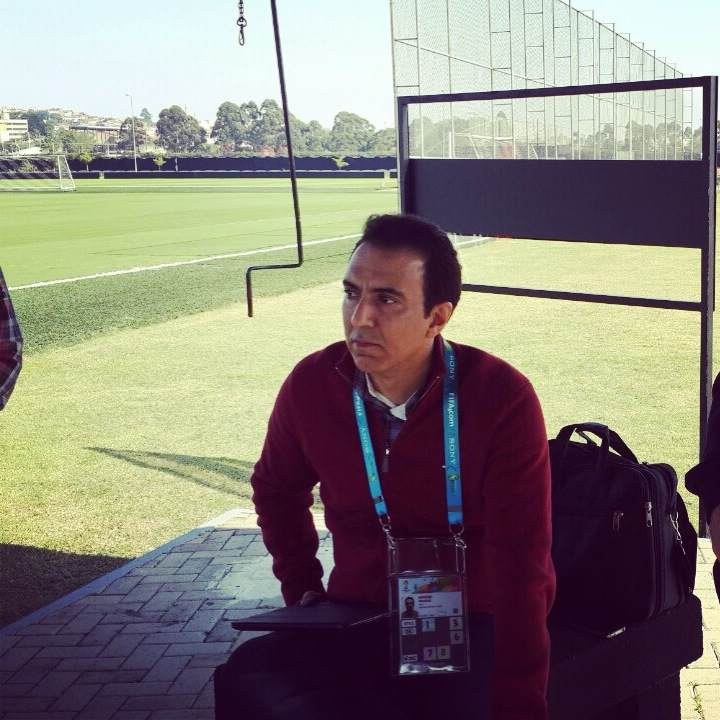
- Mazdak Mirzaei at the training ground of the Iran national football team in 2014 FIFA World Cup
- Born: 17 September 1970 (age 56); Tehran, Iran
- Occupations: TV presenter, football commentator, producer
- Years active: 1997–present

Mazdak Mirzaei (Persian: مزدک میرزایی; born 17 September 1970) is an Iranian football commentator, producer, television presenter, writer, director and translator. Mirzaei is the presenter and producer of the Hattrick program aired by Iran International. In 2005, he was awarded the prize of the best sports commentator of IRIB. Mazdak Mirzaei worked in IRIB from 1997 to 2019.

== Education ==
Mirzaei has a Bachelor of Engineering from the Islamic Azad University, Science and Research Branch, Tehran.

== Commentary ==
The match between the Nantes and Monaco teams was the first football match in which he managed to commentary parts of it for ten minutes alongside Javad Khiabani, after which he joined the football team of IRIB TV3. According to Mazdak, the match between the national teams of Iran and South Korea in the 2014 FIFA World Cup qualification, which was scored by Reza Ghoochannejhad, led to his most memorable commentary.

=== Commentary in Iran International ===
Mazdak Mirzaei made his first commentary in Iran International on 29 January 2020 for the match of R. Charleroi S.C. and Club Brugge KV in the fifth week of the Belgian First Division A. This was Mirzaei's first commentary after about 7 months away from football commentary.

== Leaving Iran ==
He left Iran in the 2019 summer and joined the Iran International satellite network. Initially, it was said that Mazdak Mirzaei had also taken a large part of the IRIB Archive with him and was planning to use it. But Seyyed Morteza Mirbagheri, Deputy of Broadcasting of the Islamic Republic of Iran, denied it. Some say the closure of the network's work space after Ali Foroughi's presidency began as a reason for his departure from Iran.

== Hattrick program ==
Mazdak Mirzaei first appeared on Iran International Satellite TV's front-facing camera on Wednesday, 4 December 2019, explaining the reasons for leaving Iran and joining the satellite network as a guest of ChandChand sport program. He performed the first episode of the Hattrick program live on Saturday, 7 December 2019.

== Effects ==
=== TV programs ===
Year	Program name	occupation	Network
1999–2019	Navad	Reporter	IRIB TV3
2013–2016	Maidan	Reporter, producer	IRIB Varzesh
2014	2014	Reporter	IRIB TV3
2016–2017	Football Bartar	Presenter	IRIB TV3
2019–present	Hattrick	Presenter, producer	Iran International

== Bibliography ==
- Derby Story (Dastan-e Shahravard). Tehran: Nashr-e Varzesh, 2014.

== Awards ==
The best sports commentator of IRIB – 2005

== See also ==
- Adel Ferdosipour
- Javad Khiabani
- Hattrick
