= Afghanistan International =

- Persian and English logos
- Country: United Kingdom
- Broadcast area: Worldwide
- Headquarters: London

Programming
- Languages: Persian and Pashto
- Picture format: 1080i (HDTV) 576i (SDTV)

Ownership
- Owner: Volant Media UK Ltd
- Sister channels: Iran International

History
- Launched: 15 August 2021; 4 years ago

Links
- Website: afintl.com

Radio Afghanistan International
- Frequencies: 7600 kHz SW (Worldwide); 999 kHz MW (Afghanistan)

Afghanistan International (AITV; Persian: افغانستان اینترنشنال) is a news and current affairs television station headquartered in London, UK, aimed at Afghans and the diaspora. The station broadcasts free-to-air on the TürkmenÄlem 52°E / MonacoSAT satellite receivable in Europe and Asia including Afghanistan, along with a radio relay transmission via shortwave (7600 kHz). It also broadcasts worldwide via online streaming platforms.

== History ==
Afghanistan International TV was launched on August 15, 2021 as a sister station of Iran International. Originally planned to start on International Day of Peace, it was launched earlier due to the situation in Afghanistan amid the Taliban's capture of Kabul on August 15 and quickly became the most popular news channel for Afghanistan due to its extensive coverage and freedom in reporting.

Originally only broadcasting programmes in Persian (Dari), the station started Pashto language broadcasts in August 2023.

In May 2024, Afghan authorities banned individuals from cooperating with or participating in programs of Afghanistan International. A spokesperson for the Taliban-controlled Ministry of Information and Culture said that “participating in discussions and facilitating the broadcast of this media outlet in public places is prohibited”.

== Programmes and content ==
AITV has journalists in both London and Washington D.C. in the United States. Alongside news and debates, it also produces documentaries.

Its flagship program Maydan brings in top policy makers and thinkers from across the world to London to discuss Afghanistan current affairs.

== See also ==
- The Afghan Times
