= Abdul Hussein Mo'ezzi =

Iranian cleric

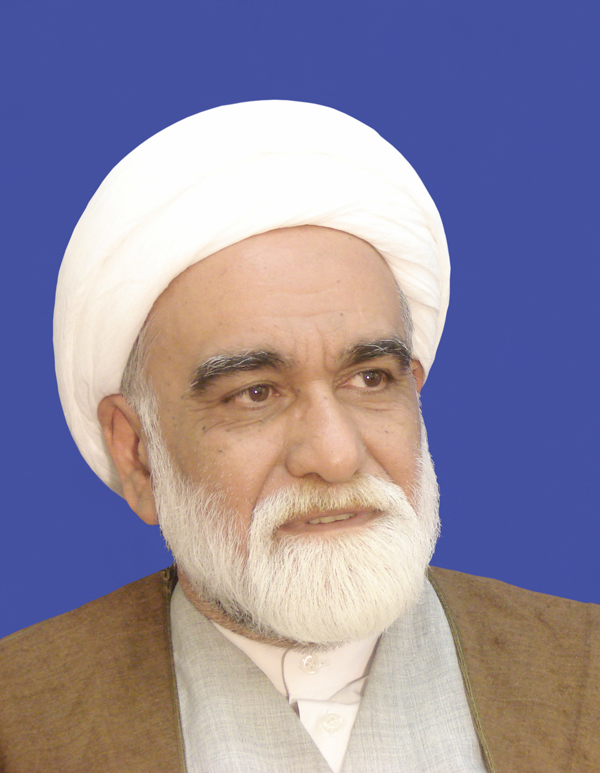

Abdul Hussein Mo'ezzi (Persian: عبدالحسين معزی; Arabic: المعزی عبدالحسين) (born in 1945) is an Iranian scholar, cleric, university lecturer, and politician. He was born in Tehran, Iran. He was the personal representative of Grand Ayatollah Ali Khamenei (the Supreme Leader of Iran) in Vienna and also the Head of the Imam Ali Islamic Centre in Vienna until 2004. At present he is the personal representative of Khamenei in London and Head of the Islamic Centre of England in London.
