= Rudolph F. Peters =

Islamic scholar

Rudolph "Ruud" F. Peters (born 16 September 1943, The Hague, died 26 March 2022, Amsterdam) was a scholar of Islamic Law at the University of Amsterdam.

Rudolph Peters studied Law, Arabic and Turkish in Amsterdam and Leiden and was appointed as lecturer at the department of Arabic and Islamic Studies at the University of Amsterdam in 1968. He completed his PhD in 1979, titled Islam and Colonialism: The Doctrine of Jihad in Modern History. He served as the director of the Netherlands Institute for Archeology and Arabic Studies in Cairo from 1982 to 1987, and was appointed professor (‘bijzonder hoogleraar’) to the UvA in 1992.

According to his obituary published by the Amsterdam Centre for Middle Eastern Studies of the University of Amsterdam, "Peters was an expert of Islamic law (the fiqh) and of the legal history of Egypt, but his research interests were broader, ranging from the reintroduction of Islamic law in Nigeria to the Dutch nationals returning from ISIS territory."

== Selected publications ==
- Islam and Colonialism: The Doctrine of Jihad in Modern History (1979)
- Jihad in Classical and Modern Islam: A Reader (1996)
- Jihad: A History in Documents (1996)
- Crime and Punishment in Islamic Law (2005)
- Sharia, Justice and Legal Order (2020)
