= Omid Habibinia =

Iranian journalist

Omid Habibinia (Persian: امید حبیبی نیا) is an Iranian journalist. He was born in Tehran. Habibinia has worked in media including BBC Persian, Islamic Republic of Iran Broadcasting, and many banned newspapers in Iran.
