= Mohsen Araki =

Iranian ayatollah

Ayatollah Mohsen Araki
- محسن اراکی
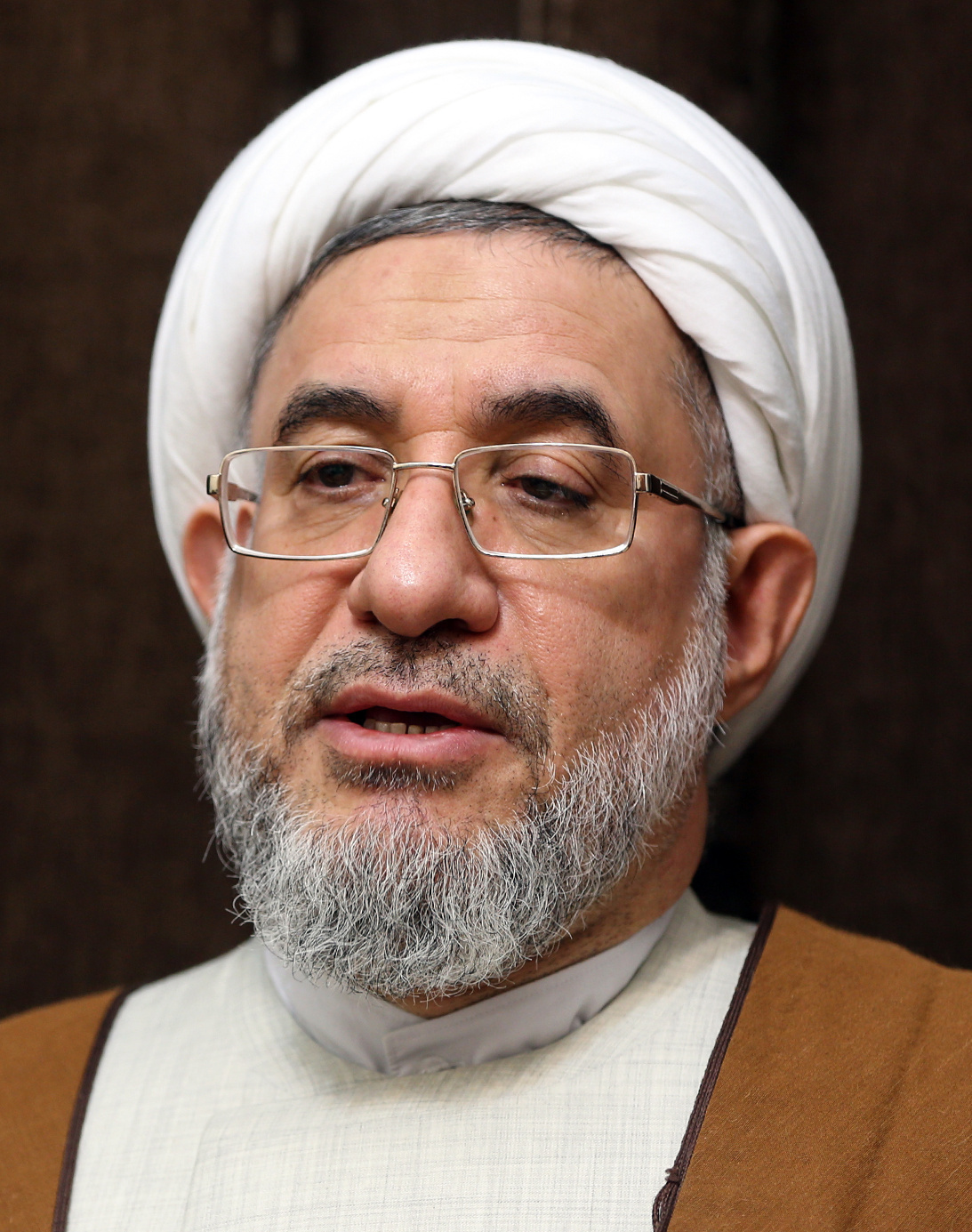
- Araki in 2019

Member of Expediency Discernment Council
- Incumbent
- Assumed office 20 September 2022
- Appointed by: Ali Khamenei
- Chairman: Sadeq Larijani

Member of the Assembly of Experts
- Incumbent
- Assumed office 24 May 2016
- Constituency: Markazi province
- Majority: 242,146
- In office 21 February 1991 – 20 February 2007
- Constituency: Khuzestan province

Personal details
- Born: 1955 (age 70–71) Najaf, Iraq
- Party: Society of Seminary Teachers of Qom
- Website: Official website

Mohsen Araki (Persian: محسن اراکی; Arabic: محسن الأراكي; born 1955) is an Iranian scholar, cleric, university lecturer and politician. He is a member of the Assembly of Experts, and a member of the Expediency Discernment Council of the System. He is one of the students of the Islamic thinker Mohammad Baqir al-Sadr.

In 2022, during the 2021–2022 Iranian protests, he advocated for the death penalty for protestors. He argued that those who participate in the protests should be found guilty of "corruption on earth".

== Life ==
He was born in Najaf, Iraq. He benefited from the Islamic seminary in Najaf and Qom. He speaks fluent Arabic and English and has authored dozens of books in Persian, Arabic, and English. He was the personal representative of Ayatollah Ali Khamenei (the Supreme Leader of Iran) in London and also the Head of the Islamic Centre of England until 2004.

In November 2025, he blamed a drought that Iran was suffering on Iranian women failing to wear their hijabs.

0n 27 January 2026, Araki called for legal action against the Assembly of Qom Seminary Scholars and Researchers for criticizing the authorities' response to the 2025–2026 Iranian protests.

== Works ==
Causality and Freedom (Al-Tawhid, Volume 17, n.2, Spring 2003)

== See also ==
- List of ayatollahs
