= Fardad Farahzad =

British Iranian journalist (born 1986)

- فرداد فرحزاد
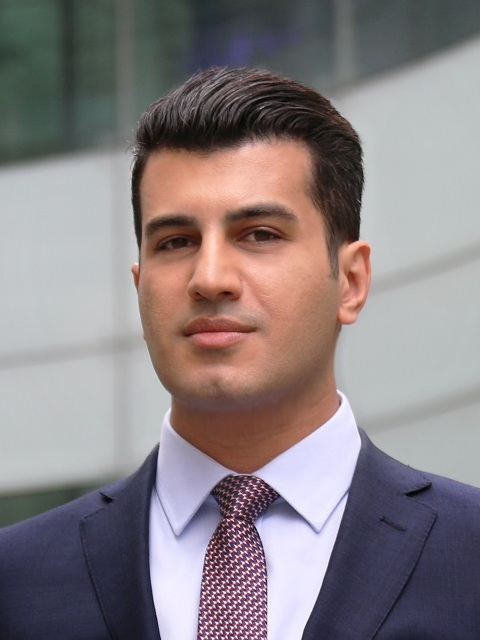
- Farahzad, 2016
- Born: 1 April 1986 (age 40); Bandar-e Anzali, Iran
- Education: Ajman University of Science and Technology
- Occupation: Journalist
- Notable credit(s): Iran International, BBC
- Website: farahzad.com

Fardad Farahzad (Persian: فرداد فرحزاد, born 1 April 1986) is an Iranian-British journalist, television presenter, and media entrepreneur. He is the anchor of 24 With Fardad Farahzad on Iran International, the network's flagship news program. Farahzad is also the founder of YourTime TV, a decentralized satellite television platform that allows users to upload videos and select broadcast times.

Farahzad worked for the BBC World Service from 2008 to 2018, serving as a news presenter and reporter for BBC Persian TV. He has anchored and covered major Iranian and international news stories, including the 2009 Iranian presidential election and protests, Iran's nuclear program, the Arab Spring, multiple United States presidential elections, the European migrant crisis, the COVID-19 pandemic, the Mahsa Amini protests, the Gaza war, the 2024 California wildfires, and ongoing Iran nuclear negotiations.

Since joining Iran International, Farahzad has been known for his objective and impartial journalistic approach. His program 24 regularly covers major international events, often broadcasting live from the field during significant developments. In October 2023, following the outbreak of the Gaza war, Farahzad was among the first international journalists to report from Israel, anchoring his program there for over a month. He also covers major political events in the United States, including presidential elections, inaugurations, and party conventions such as the Republican National Convention and the Democratic National Convention.
