= Dale F. Eickelman =

American anthropologist

- Born: December 15, 1942 (age 83); Evergreen Park, Illinois, U.S.
- Education: Dartmouth College (AB); McGill University (MA); University of Chicago (PhD)
- Occupations: Anthropologist, professor

Dale F. Eickelman (born December 15, 1942) is an American anthropologist with an expertise on the Middle East. He is the Ralph and Richard Lazarus Professor of Anthropology and Human Relations at Dartmouth College.

== Biography ==
Eickelman was born on December 15, 1942, in Evergreen Park. Currently, he is the Ralph and Richard Lazarus Professor of Anthropology and Human Relations Emeritus at Dartmouth College. Eickelman studied anthropology and Islamic studies and he earned his bachelor's degree from Dartmouth, going on to earn his master's degree from McGill University in Montreal. Eickelman received his Doctor of Philosophy from the University of Chicago. Eickelman is a former president of the Middle East Studies Association of North America and is a fellow of the Institute for Advanced Study in Princeton. Between 2000 and 2001 and 2009–2010, he was a fellow of the Wissenschaftskolleg zu Berlin. Eickelman currently serves as senior advisor to Kuwait's liberal arts university, the American University of Kuwait. In 2009, Dale Eickelman was named a Carnegie Scholar for a two-year period, and in 2011 he received the Distinguished Scholar Award from the Middle East Section of the American Anthropological Association. Eickelman claims to have been boyhood friends with Ted Kaczynski. They experimented with homemade bombs in the 1950's.

== Works ==
- Eickelman, Dale F.: (1976) Moroccan Islam Tradition and Society in a Pilgrimage Center. Texas: University of Texas Press
- Eickelman, Dale F.: (1981) The Middle East and Central Asia. Dartmouth: Dartmouth College
- Eickelman, Dale F.: (1985) Knowledge and Power in Morocco. Princeton: Princeton University Press
- Eickelman, Dale F. & James P. Piscatori: (1996) Muslim Politics. Princeton: Princeton University Press
- Eickelman, Dale F. & Jon W. Anderson: (1999) New Media in the Muslim World: The Emerging Public Sphere. Indiana: Indiana University Press

== Papers and Lectures Related on Ibadism ==
- Eickelman, Dale F.: (1980) Religious tradition, economic domination and political legitimacy: Morocco and Oman. Revue de l'Occident Musulman et de la Méditerranée (Aix-en-Provence), nr. 29 (1980), 17–30.
- Eickelman, Dale F.: (1983) Religious knowledge in Inner-Oman. Journal of Oman Studies (Muscat), vol. 6, part 1 (1983), 163–172.
- Eickelman, Dale F.: (1984) Kings and people: Oman's State Consultative Council. Middle East Journal (Washington, D.C.), vol. 38 nr. 1 (Winter 1984), 61–71.
- Eickelman, Dale F.: (1985) From theocracy to monarchy: authority and legitimacy in inner Oman, 1935–1957. International Journal of Middle East Studies (Cambridge/New York), 17 (1985), 3-24.
- Eickelman, Dale F.: (1987) Ibaḍism and the sectarian perspective. In: Pridham (ed.) 1987, 31- 50.
- Eickelman, Dale F.: (1989) National identity and religious discourse in contemporary Oman. International Journal of Islamic and Arabic Studies (Bloomington), vol. 6 nr. 1 (1989), 1-20.
- Eickelman, Dale F.: (1990) Identité nationale et discours religieux en Oman. In: Gilles Kepel and Yann Richard: (eds.) Intellectuels et militants de l'Islam contemporain. Paris: Seuil, 1990, 103–128.
- Eickelman, Dale F.: (1991) Counting and surveying an « inner » Omani community: Hamra al-ʿAbriyin. In: E.G.H. Joffé and J.R. Pennell: (eds.) Tribe and state. Essays in honour of David Montgomery Hart.Wisbech: MENAS Press, 1991, 253–277.
- Eickelman, Dale F.: (1991) Traditional Islamic learning and the ideas of the person in the twentieth century. In: Martin Kramer: (ed.) Middle Eastern lives. The practice of biography and self-narrative. Syracuse: Syracuse University Press, 1991, 35–59, 148–150.
- Eickelman, Dale F.: (1998) Being bedouin: nomads and tribes in the Arab social imagination. In: J. Ginat and A.M. Khazanov: (eds.) Changing nomads in a changing world. Brighton: Sussex University Press, 1998, 38–49.
- Eickelman, Dale F.: (2002) Savoir religieux et éducation dans l'Oman intérieur d'hier à aujourd'hui. In: Lavergne and Dumortier (eds.) 2002, 231–244.
- Eickelman, Dale F.: (2014) The modern face of Ibadism in Oman. In Ziaka (ed.) 2014a, 151- 164.
- Eickelman, Dale: (2014) The American perspective (in Ibāḍī historical studies). A lecture delivered at: International Conference: today's perspectives on Ibāḍī history and the historical sources.
