= Iranian influence operations in the United Kingdom =

The Islamic Republic of Iran has conducted a range of influence operations within the United Kingdom, according to government officials, researchers, and security analysts.

Reports have attributed these activities to efforts aimed at undermining British political cohesion, promoting narratives aligned with Iranian state interests, and targeting Iranian dissidents and journalists based in the UK. Reported activities include online influence campaigns, the dissemination of fundamentalist Islamic ideology, lobbying British politicians to encourage policies perceived as conciliatory toward Iran, and involvement in plots and intimidation campaigns.

Iranian operations are primarily attributed to the Islamic Revolutionary Guards Corps. In 2025, British government adviser, Jonathan Hall told the New York Times, the United Kingdom "Faces 'Extraordinary' Threat from Russian and Iranian Plots".

== Background ==
Iran views the United Kingdom as a "historic antagonist" due to the United Kingdom's colonial history in the Middle East. According to the UK defence journal, the weakening of the UK's "internal cohesion" is part of Iran's strategy in fighting Western countries through asymmetric warfare. Due to financial limitations, Iran has employed "cover online influence" as a relatively cheap method to influence politics and beliefs in western countries. Iran is said to view the United Kingdom as "Little Satan", whilst the United States is viewed as "Big Satan".

== Influence operations in the United Kingdom ==
Iran was placed in the highest tier of the foreign influence register in 2025.

According to the National Union for Democracy in Iran (NUFDI), the Islamic revolutionary guard corps (IRGC) has been conducting operations in the United Kingdom to promote fundamentalist ideology aligned with IRGC propaganda. NUFDI asserts that Iran has used cultural centers as “propaganda hubs” and has identified three main objectives behind these operations. The political objective involves lobbying British politicians to encourage a policy of appeasement toward Iran. The cultural objective focuses on whitewashing Iran's actions and radicalizing the Iranian diaspora. The educational objective seeks to "manipulate" young people into justifying actions deemed terrorism by the West and into accepting Iranian propaganda.

Among the centers identified as advancing Iranian objectives is the Islamic Centre of Britain, whose director, Seyed Hashem Moosavi, was personally appointed by Iran's Supreme Leader, Ali Khamenei. According to NUFDI, the Islamic Centre—referred to as ICE—operates across several regions in the United Kingdom. Branches flagged for concerns over radicalization include the Manchester centre, the Tawheed Newcastle Islamic Centre, the Imam Reza Cultural Centre in Birmingham, and Glasgow's Al-Mahdi Islamic Centre.

A Birmingham center has reportedly received UK funding that was subsequently funneled to IRGC generals Abu Mahdi Al-Mohandis and Qassem Solemani, both designated as terrorists by Western governments. The Iranian regime's political outreach in the United Kingdom aims to shape public and political opinion by engaging with various groups to promote a more lenient stance among British lawmakers. According to NUFDI, this strategy has been bolstered by broader liberal trends in the West, which Tehran exploits to portray itself as a victim of Western hostility. The regime's influence is said to extend beyond official diplomacy, reaching into think tanks, academic institutions, and media platforms to disseminate pro-regime narratives. A prominent example is the Islamic Human Rights Commission (IHRC) in London, a self-described human rights charity with an annual budget exceeding £400,000. Its director, Massoud Shadjareh, has publicly expressed support for figures such as Qassem Soleimani and organizes events including the IHRC's annual Al-Quds Day rally.

According to NUFDI, the Iranian regime's involvement in the UK's education sector is particularly concerning, with reported initiatives spanning from early childhood to postgraduate levels. These efforts are said to promote a worldview centered on the Islamic Republic, seeking to shape the ideological outlook of students from diverse backgrounds. NUFDI characterizes this as an attempt to cultivate a generation sympathetic to the regime's objectives, a strategy it views as incompatible with British democratic values and aligned with Tehran's broader efforts to advance the Islamic Revolution abroad.

The report highlights instances of cooperation between UK academic institutions and Iranian entities in sensitive areas such as drone technology. According to the findings, individuals with links to the IRGC have allegedly received public funding to conduct research at British universities, thereby enabling Iran to circumvent its domestic technological constraints. According to the report, "In essence, dual-use technology that the Islamic Republic of Iran could not develop domestically is instead researched and advanced within the UK through the educational network established by ICE6768." NUFDI further noted, "Reportedly, this research may be linked to improvements in guidance range, accuracy, and manufacturing efficiency as Iran expanded its production of kamikaze drones for Russia's war in Ukraine."

Educational institutions identified in connection with pro-regime activities include the Islamic Republic of Iran School in London, the Tebyan Islamic School, the Navid Ayandeh International School, and the Islamic College.

NUFDI warned that Iran has transformed the United Kingdom into a key hub for disseminating extremist ideology and exerting regime influence, exploiting what it describes as limited government oversight. The report stated that institutions tied to the IRGC and Iran's Ministry of Intelligence (MOIS) operate openly, often under the cover of cultural or educational centers. NUFDI suggested that similar networks may also exist in the United States and across Europe, describing the scale of the UK operation as “shocking.” In total, the organization identified more than 20 regime-linked institutions in Britain.

Policy Exchange concluded that Iran is "actively meddling in British society and politics." According to the paper, Iran represents a "direct threat to British social cohesion." The report identified networks of agents and allies operating in the United Kingdom that have been used to "infiltrate British society," noting overlap between these influence operations and Iranian intelligence activity. It further highlighted pan-Islamic institutions supported by Iran as key vehicles for advancing Tehran's agenda, with these organizations promoting "anti-Western causes."

=== Encouragement of UK disunity ===
In 2014, ahead of Scotland's independence referendum, Iranian-linked social media accounts circulated memes and cartoons of UK Prime Minister David Cameron portraying England as authoritarian. Iranian Facebook pages also mimicked Scottish media outlets, enabling them to gain traction.

Iranian state English language media, Press TV was used to showcase Scottish independence as "anti imperialist" and spread stories that the London government was "militarizing Scottish territory to suppress secessionist sentiment". According to the UK Defence Journal, Iran's influence operations in 2014 did not achieve significant impact in Scotland. The journal identified the dissemination of Iran's narrative of portraying "Scotland as oppressed, Westminster as colonial overlord, and independence as liberation".

In 2023, it was found that the Scottish National Party (SNP) provided £372k to an Iran linked mosque.

In 2025, The Times reported that Iran's Revolutionary Guard Corps has a network of fake X (formerly Twitter) accounts which are used to cause tension and disunity within the United Kingdom and the United States. It was found that Iranian linked accounts demonstrate support for Scottish independence and for the Scottish National Party. Clemson University researchers, who had previously discovered the Russian network in the 2016 US elections, discovered at least 80 accounts pretending to be left wing British citizens. According to the Times, "at least 4 per cent of the discussion on X surrounding Scottish independence" was done by the Iranian network. The network had at least a quarter million followers according to the researchers.

Scottish Government minister Angus Robertson, when asked about allegations that thousands of social media posts supporting Scottish independence originated from an Iranian-backed influence campaign, rejected concerns that Scottish independence was being backed by Iran and denounced the allegations as "seeking to smear people in this country who believe that this country should be a sovereign state". The Scottish Conservative MSP Murdo Fraser accused Robertson of failing to recognise that "bad actors" were seeking to capitalise on the pro-independence movement.

According to the Jewish Chronicle's editor, Iran's strategy in the UK is to "destabilise the UK and the government in Westminster". According to the Jewish Chronicle, supporting Scottish independence assists in the achievement of Iran's goals.

According to right-wing think tank Policy Exchange, Iranian Islamic organizations operating within the United Kingdom have deep influence on the Scottish National Party.

The Times found in 2024, that an Iranian twitter network was promoting criticism of the British monarchy. The Times also found that the Iranian network targeted anti-immigrations riots and the Reform UK party.

==== Twelve-Day War ====
Following the Twelve-Day War of 13–24 June 2025, the UK-based defence think tank UK Defence journal found evidence showing an Iranian social media campaign seeking to influence the United Kingdom's internal integrity. A network of Twitter accounts linked with Iran went silent following the Israeli attack on the country, where Israel extensively targeted Iranian military, electrical, and communications infrastructure. Iran had power blackouts as well as internet shortages following the attack. Iranian accounts stopped operating following Israeli strikes on electronic warfare and cyber operations infrastructure of the Islamic Revolutionary Guards Corps in Iran. 48 hours after the strikes, Iran blacked out the internet. When they returned to posting, these accounts' narratives had shifted to emphasising Iranian resilience against Israeli attacks. The UK Defence Journal found that Iran was using the issue of Scottish independence to "weaken" Britain as well as "amplifying internal division", but noted in its editor's note that it did "not claim that Scottish independence is a foreign plot". The Journal also noted that Iran is exploiting anti-imperialist or left-wing sentiment to promote its own agenda.

In August 2025, the UK Defence Journal documented the case of "@fiona175161", an X account using an AI-generated profile image whose biography said she was as a "Proud Scottish lass" advocating for independence. The account fell silent during Iran's 13–25 June blackout, then resumed with pro-Iran messaging before reverting to Scottish independence content.

=== Terrorism and violence in UK ===
In 2022, 20 plots by Iran targeting British citizens were foiled by UK security agencies. In 2022, MI5 found an increase of 48% in Iranian activity in the UK in comparison to 2021. In May 2025, three men, alleged to be Iranian spies were arrested and accused of targeted Iranian opposition journalists, specifically journalists working for Iran International based in the United Kingdom. The BBC reported that "they are charged with engaging in conduct likely to assist a foreign intelligence service, namely that of Iran" There accused also of collecting information in order to violently target a UK based individual.

In June 2025, British government adviser, Jonathan Hall said the United Kingdom "Faces 'Extraordinary' Threat from Russian and Iranian Plots". Hall said Iran uses local criminals in order to perform intimidation, violence and espionage within the United Kingdom." A British army soldier, Daniel Khalife, was accused of spying for Iran after "offering his services as a double agent" to MI5. Hall told the New York Times that Iran and Russia were exploiting polarization in the West to achieve their aims.

On 6 March 2026, UK counter-terrorism police officers arrested four men in London as part of an ongoing investigation under the National Security Act 2023. The suspects (Iranian national and three dual British-Iranian citizens) are accused of assisting Iran's foreign intelligence service by conducting surveillance on members, locations, and individuals connected to Jewish communities, such as the one in London.

== Operations against Iranians in the UK ==
=== Against journalists and media ===
According to Reporters Without Borders, Iran is carrying out "systematic targeting of journalists reporting on Iran from abroad, in an effort to silence them." The group also reported that "London, home to major Persian-language broadcasters, has been a hotspot for such attacks because of the large number of Iranian journalists based there," Tim Davie, the BBC director general identified "significant and increasingly alarming" in "attempts to pressure BBC Persian journalists' families in Iran, including arbitrary interrogations, travel bans, passport confiscations, and threats of asset seizures".

In 2024, Iran international journalist, Pouria Zeraati was stabbed in an assassination attempt by Iran. BBC Persian language journalists and staff reported that their families are being "terrorised" by the Iranian regime. According to the National Union of Journalists, Persian-language journalists who wish to visit their families in Iran will be "placing their lives in direct danger". According to a BBC journalist, Iran is punishing their families for their work. BBC jouranlists have also received death and rape threats from Iran. Vahid Beheseit, a British Iranian political activist said the UK's lack of action against the IRGC is "encouraging them to continue assassinations and terrorist activities, brainwashing our youth and creating a sleeping cell. We are somehow encouraging them instead of stopping them, by not holding them accountable."

== 2026 Iranian internet blackout ==
At the end of 2025, a wave of protests rose throughout Iran. The Iranian government responded in massacres and Internet shutdown. Just as in June 2025, thousands of Pro-Scottish accounts on X (formally twitter) went silent, once again raising suspicions that these accounts are linked to Tehran and its intentions to interfere with British politics. The investigation in 2025 revealed that there were about 1,300 suspicious accounts, that shared together 3,000 posts, that estimates say reached 224 million views and 126,000 engagements. In January 2026, the same users went silent again, and authorities were informed.

== UK countermeasures ==
On 1 July 2025, the United Kingdom government initiated new measures "to protect UK from covert foreign influence". The United Kingdom named Russia and Iran as the two chief actors which threaten the safety and the "democratic" integrity of the United Kingdom. UK Parliament's Intelligence and Security Committee said in 2025 that Iran had tried to kidnap at least 15 individuals in the UK.

== See also ==
- Iran–United Kingdom relations
- Iranian external operations
- 2024 Iranian operations inside Australia
