= List of Sharif University of Technology people =

This is a list of notable alumni and faculty members of the Sharif University of Technology by profession.

== Academics ==
- Farhad Ardalan, Professor of Particle Physics, APS Fellow
- Ehsan Afshari, Professor of Electrical Engineering and Computer Science at the University of Michigan
- Mohammad-Reza Aref, Professor of the Electrical Engineering department
- Reza Ghotbi, former lecturer of Maths
- Mehdi Bahadori, Professor of Mechanical Engineering
- William Chittick, Professor of Religious Studies at the State University of New York
- Mohammed Ghanbari, Professor of Electronic Systems Engineering at the University of Essex
- Mehdi Golshani, theoretical physicist and philosopher
- Fariborz Haghighat, Professor of Building, Civil and Environmental Engineering, Concordia University
- Ali Hajimiri, Thomas G. Myers Professor of Electrical Engineering at the California Institute of Technology (Caltech)
- Payam Heydari, Chancellor's Professor of Electrical Engineering at the University of California, Irvine (UCI)
- Ali Jadbabaie, Alfred Fitler Moore Professor of Electrical and Systems Engineering at the University of Pennsylvania and MIT
- Kourosh Kalantar-zadeh, Inventor, Australian Research Council Laureate Fellow and Professor at the UNSW
- Nezam Mahdavi-Amiri, Distinguished Professor of Mathematics
- Reza Mansouri, Professor of physics at SUT and a visiting professor at the McGill University
- Alireza Mashaghi, Scientist at Harvard University and the Leiden University
- Maryam Mirzakhani, Professor of Mathematics at the Stanford University
- Mohammad Mahdi Nayebi, Professor of Electrical Engineering at the Sharif University of Technology
- Behzad Razavi, Professor of Electronics at the UCLA
- Fazlollah Reza, former Chancellor and professor at the MIT, McGill University, and University of Tehran
- Sayed Khatiboleslam Sadrnezhaad, Professor of Metallurgical Engineering
- Ali Akbar Salehi, Professor of Mechanical Engineering
- Jawad Salehi, Professor of Mechanical and Computer Engineering
- Homayoun Seraji, former Jet Propulsion Laboratory senior researcher
- Mohammad Shahidehpour, Director of Electrical Engineering at the Illinois Institute of Technology
- Siavash Shahshahani, Professor of Mathematics
- Saeed Sohrabpour, current Chancellor and professor in Mechanical Engineering
- Rahmat Shoureshi, President of Portland State University

== Business ==
- Alex Mehr and Shayan Zadeh, founders of Zoosk.
- Behdad Esfahbod, former Senior Staff Software Engineer at Google

== Government and politics ==
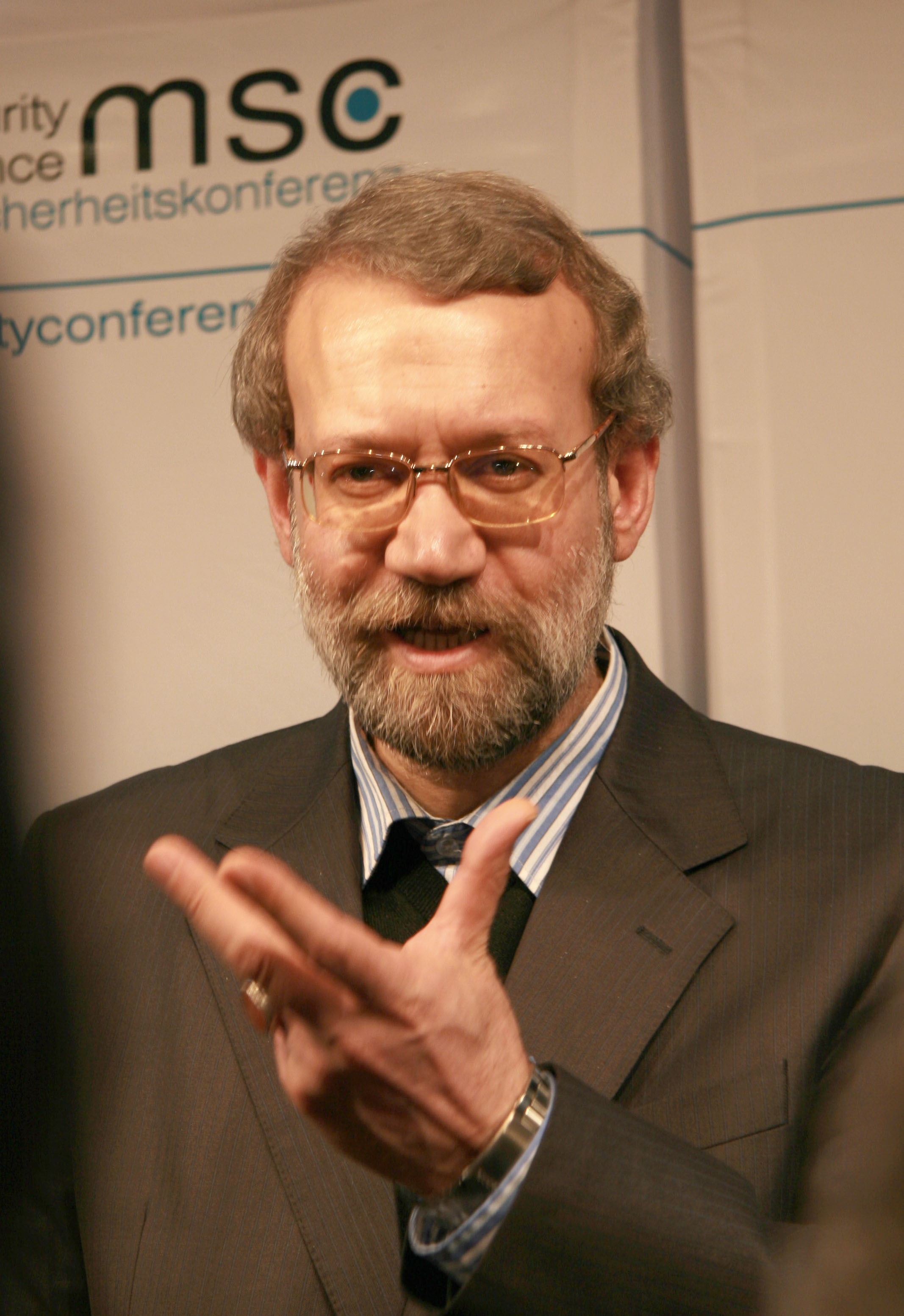
Ali Larijani, former Speaker of the Iranian Parliament.

- Morteza Alviri, former Mayor of Tehran
- Mohammad Atrianfar, politician
- Majid Farahani, reformist politician
- Ali Larijani, former Speaker of the Iranian Parliament
- Mohammad-Ali Najafi, politician and advisor
- Abdul Rahman Saleem, Islamic activist
- Maryam Rajavi, president of the PMOI
- Foad Mostafa Soltani, Kurdish political leader
- Abdul Rahman Saleem, British-Iranian Islamist activist

== Arts and media ==
- Adel Ferdosipour, prominent football commentator
- Hamid Naderi Yeganeh, mathematical artist
- Mohsen Sazegara, journalist and political activist
- Peyman Yazdanian, pianist

== Sports ==
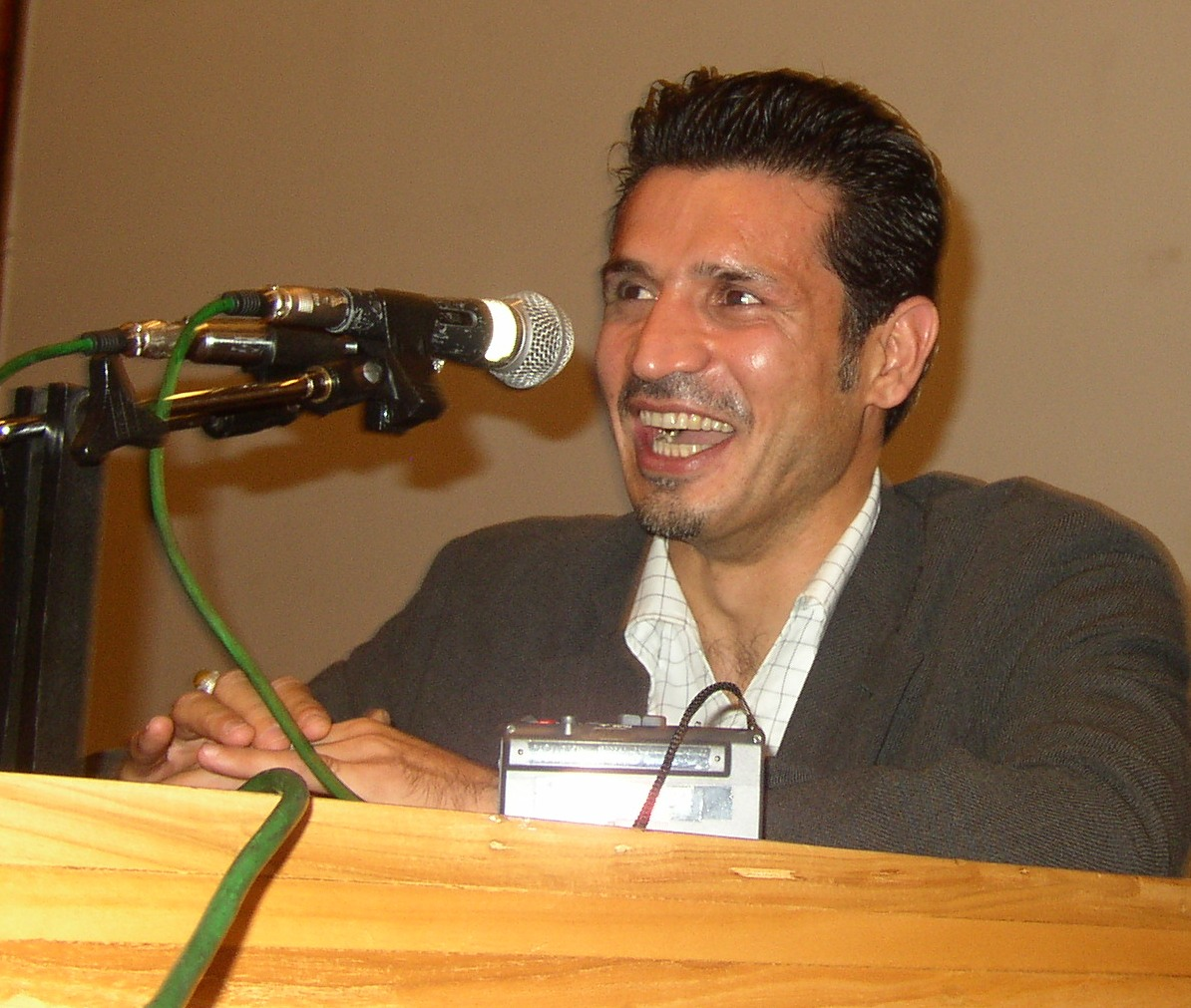
Ali Daei giving a speech at SUT.

- Ali Daei, retired footballer with all-time highest International goalscorer record
- Elshan Moradi, chess grandmaster

== Presidents ==
- Dr. Mohammad Ali Mojtahedi from 1965
- Prof. Fazlollah Reza from 1968
- Dr. Mohammad Reza Amin from 1968
- Dr. Hossein Nasr from 1972
- Dr. Mehdi Zarghamee from 1975
- Dr. Alireza Mehran from 1977
- Dr. Hossein Ali Anvari from 1978
- Dr. Ali Mohammad Ranjbar from 1979
- Dr. Abbas Anvari from 1980
- Dr. Ali Akbar Salehi from 1988
- Dr. Mohammad Etemadi from 1993
- Dr. Sayed Khatiboleslam Sadrnezhaad from 1995
- Dr. Saeed Sohrabpour from 1997
- Dr. Reza Roosta Azad from 2010
- Dr. Mahmud Fotuhi Firuzabad from 2014
- Dr. Rasoul Jalili from 2021
- Dr. Abbas Mousavi from 2023

== See also ==
- Higher education in Iran
- List of University of Tehran people
- List of Iranian scholars
