= History of electricity in Iran =

Aspect of Iranian history

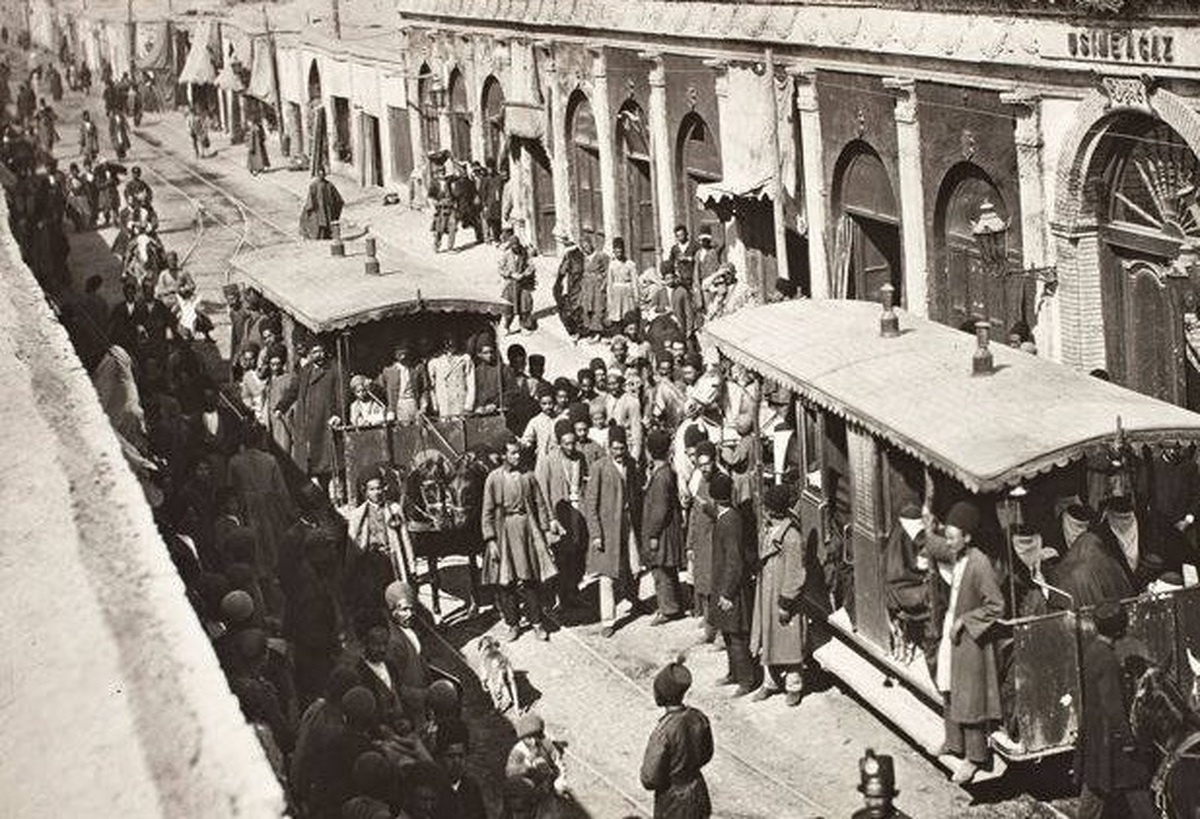
Cheragh-bargh street, one of the first streets in Tehran that was illuminated by electricity

The history of electricity in Iran covers the past events and establishments in Iran regarding the use of electricity, which are of historical value.

The first known use of electricity in Iran was in the early 1850s by Iranian students of the Dār ul-Funun institution for the purpose of sending a telegraph signal. Other than use of electricity for communication, the first known use of electricity for lighting took place in Baab-e Homayoun of Tehran, around 1879. In 1883 another electric generator was brought for the Shah’s palace, which could be used by the public during ceremonies.

The first power plant of Iran was established in 1902 in Mashhad, another one soon following in 1905 settling in Tehran. Private sectors and different cities later established their own power plant. By 1969, with the use of plants of Amir Kabir Dam, Tarasht, and Farajabad, other minor plants were closed.

== Background ==
In the first quarter of 19th century, government issued an instruction, for instalment of lanterns in the streets. Later, use of gas lighting instead of traditional lanterns begun, and Cheragh-Gaaz factory which was a gas lighting factory, became the first of its kind in Iran. It was established in Cheragh-Gaaz street of Tehran in around 1873, by efforts of Mirza Hosein Sepahsalar, who was the Grand Vizier of Iran at the time. It was using coal and was lighting some streets of Tehran.

== Use of electricity by Baghdad battery ==
The Baghdad Battery is the name given to a set of three artifacts which were found together: a ceramic pot, a tube of copper, and a rod of iron. It was discovered in close proximity of Ctesiphon, the capital of the Parthian (150 BC – 223 AD) and Sasanian (224–650 AD) empires, and it is believed to date from either of these periods. It was hypothesized by Wilhelm König, that the object functioned as a galvanic cell, possibly used for electroplating, or some kind of electrotherapy, but there is no electroplated object known from this period, and the claims are near universally rejected by archaeologists.

== Use of electricity for communication ==
Before the use of electricity for lighting, for the first time electricity was used for an experimental telegraph communication between the two rooms in Dār ul-Funun institution, in early 1850s. This was done by Iranian students of the institution, and for the next time, they extended its length up to Lalehzar garden.

What these students had accomplished, resulted in establishing of a telegraph line from Karaj up to Soltanieh under supervision of government. Later when Tabriz was connected to Soltanieh, as a result the two strategic cities of Tehran and Tabriz got connected together in 1860.

== First use of electricity for lighting ==
Based on the memoirs of Mohammad Hassan Khan Etemad al-Saltaneh, there had been an electricity generator which had been installed in "Baab-e Homayoun" and it had some number of lamps connected to it, which was lighting the "Baab-e Homayoun" street. The date for use of this generator is unknown, but it must be before 1879.

There is also a report by Etemad al-Saltaneh, which describes establishment of a small electric factory by Mirza Ali Khan Amin al-Dawla in Majma-o-Sanaye which was situated in Baab-e Homayoun street. This factory was founded on September 4, 1879 by Naser al-Din Shah Qajar. There is another report which mentions presence of electric lamps (which could increase their radius of propagation), Pin insulator, and electric outlets in the factory. There is also a mention of electric lighting in a ceremony on October 30, 1884, which shows presence of the electricity factory during these years.

== Lighting for Shah's palace and ceremonies ==
Not much later than Edison's successes in the field of lighting, in 1883, another electric generator which could light at least eight lamps was imported to Iran. In the documents published about electric industry of Iran, the story of importing this generator is covered. These lamps were used to illuminate Golestan palace, however two years later it was also used for lighting public ceremonies for ordinary people.

Considering production of electric lamps by Edison in 1879, Iran was one of the first countries in the world which benefited from this invention. In later years, there were even some lamps which had depicted image of Qajar Shahs, which are now being kept in the private collections of an Iranian collector in Tabriz.

Tadj-o Saltaneh, daughter of Naser al-Din Shah Qajar, has written in her memoirs about a game by use of electric lamps, in the court, which was known as "Cheragh Khamoosh Koni", which was like when the lights were turned off by the Shah, the ladies in the court could cause chaos as per their wish, but suddenly when the light was turned on, all those who were misbehaving could be seen. This might be the first recorded use of electricity as a game.

== Larger electricity generating factories ==
The first large municipal power plant of Iran was established in 1902 by Mohammad Bagher Milani, who was better known as "Rezayof" in Mashhad city. Its capital was provided by Mozaffar ad-Din Shah Qajar, and in addition to Imam Reza shrine it was lighting a street called as "Bala Khiaban" which was in between the factory and the shrine.

The next large municipal power plant was established in 1905 by Mohammad Hosein Amin ol-Zarb in Tehran, whose power capacity was 400 kilowatt, and was working based on steam piston. He was a capitalist originally from Isfahan, and bought this factory on his trip to Russia, for 500 Tooman. This power plant which was named as "Cheragh Bargh" was generating single phase 220 volts electricity and three phase 380 volts electricity to customers for 6 hours a day.

== Modern developments ==
Around the year 1924 the private sectors including flour, spinning, and textile factories, along with some municipalities in different cities of Iran, established their own small generators of the type of diesel or steam turbine, in order to provide the electricity for their industry or lighting the city.

In 1937, the first electric power plant with the power of 6400 KW, of steam type, was bought by Tehran municipality. It was situated in north east of Tehran, out of Doshan-Tappe gate (Meydan-e Shohada), and later diesel generators and also other steam turbines was added to increase the production power of the plant.

By establishing of plants of Amir Kabir Dam, Alestum (Tarasht plant) and Farajabad (Be'sat) by 1969, and production of enough electricity for the time, the plants which were situated in Doshan-Tappe were closed.

Today, more than 91% of Iran’s electricity production is from thermal power plants, which are based on natural gas, fuel oil, and diesel. On the other hand, more than 95% of total fossil-based power generation of Iran, are based in 61 major Iranian power plants.
