= Iranian Machine Design Competition =

National design competition for universities of Iran

Iranian Machine Design Competition Persian: مسابقه ملی طراحی ماشین
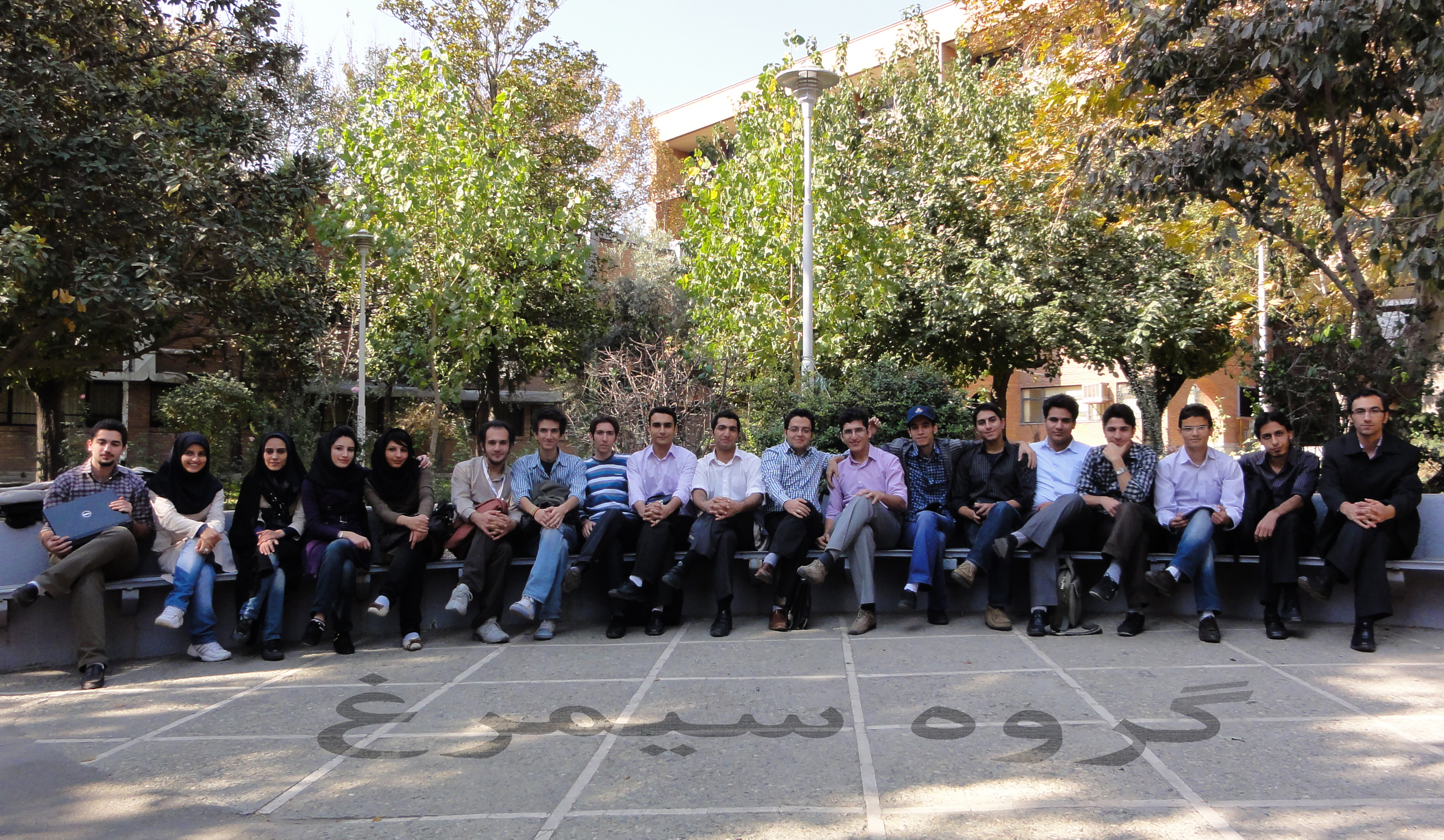
- Competing group from Imam Khomeini International University (2010)
- Genre: Competition
- Venue: Sharif University of Technology
- Country: Iran
- Inaugurated: 2008; 18 years ago

The Iranian Machine Design Competition (Persian: مسابقه ملی طراحی ماشین) is a national design competition for universities of Iran. This competition is held at the Sharif University of Technology, and different groups from around the country attend and compete in different categories such as conceptual, industrial, and scientific design.

== History ==
The national competition of Electric Automobile Design was planned, held, and opened by the efforts of the Shahid Rezaie Research Center of Sharif University of Technology. The first course was held in 2006.

== See also ==
- Sharif University of Technology
- Simorq
