= Shahbal =

General information
- Type: Unmanned Aerial Vehicle
- Manufacturer: Shahbal Group, Sharif University of Technology
- Status: In development

History
- First flight: 2006

Shahbal is an unmanned aerial vehicle (UAV) designed by a group of aerospace engineers at Sharif University of Technology.

== Design and development ==
Shahbal was designed by the team of three newly graduated aerospace engineers of Sharif University of Technology, namely Alireza, Amirreza Kosari and Mohammad Rahim.

Originating from a national competition, Shahbal was first designed to fulfill the contest requirements. Right at the beginning stages, the development team expanded their goals. Shahbal was awarded the Best Design Prize during the first National UAV Design Competition (NUDC-2006) of Iran and was awarded as a top-ranked vehicle after passing all the flight tests planned for the contest.

== Technical design ==
Shahbal team (left to right: Amirreza, Mohammad, Alireza)

Shahbal is a close-range multi-role UAV and is well-designed for surveillance/reconnaissance missions, along with patrols and pilot trainings. The structure is mainly composites and with a small radar cross section (RCS), Shahbal is able to complete its missions very close to the enemy radars. The twin tail configuration empowers Shahbal of high sharp and fast maneuvers in both civil and military applications. Control is both in manual (radio control) and autopilot (GPS/INS) mode. The autopilot used is a MP2000 of MicroPilot; also Shahbal is designed to fulfill nap-of-the-earth maneuvers such as terrain following and terrain avoidance. The landing gear mechanism is a fix tricycle plus an arresting hook. Powerplant is a 4.5 hp ZDZ engine installed as pusher, at the end of main body. Mission payloads are depending on the type of mission, and range from small cameras and telemetry systems to heavy munitions and weapons. Maximum payload weight is 5.5 kg (12 lb).

== Specifications ==
General characteristics

- Crew: Unmanned
- Length: 2.05 m (8 ft 1 in)
- Wingspan: 2.47 m (6 ft 8 in)
- Empty weight: 9.5 kg (21 lb)
- Gross weight: 17.5 kg (38 lb)
- Powerplant: 1 × ZDZ , 3.4 kW (4.5 hp)

Performance

- Maximum speed: 180 km/h (112 mph, 97 kn)
- Cruise speed: 130 km/h (81 mph, 70 kn)
- Range: 12 km (7.5 mi, 6.5 nmi)
- Service ceiling: 3,000 m (4,500 ft)
- Rate of climb: 5.0 m/s (985 ft/min)

== See also ==
- Aerospace engineering
- Sarad
- Sharif University of Technology

Related lists

- List of unmanned aerial vehicles
