= Ardalan Vahidi =

Mechanical Engineer

- Born: Iran
- Occupation: Professor
- Known for: Fellow of the Institute of Electrical and Electronics Engineers

Ardalan Vahidi is an Iranian-American mechanical engineer, specializing in optimal control and estimation, energy-efficient mobility, connected and automated vehicles, electrified transportation, and human bioenergetics during exercise. He is known for his pioneering contributions to methods that significantly enhance the energy efficiency of vehicles, particularly connected and automated vehicles and hybrid electric vehicles. Vahidi has collaborated with major manufacturers such as BMW, Ford, and Cummins, and has led numerous federally sponsored projects, culminating in successful on-road demonstrations. His work has been instrumental in achieving up to 30% energy savings in vehicles through innovative algorithms and real-time optimization techniques.

== Early life and education ==
Ardalan Vahidi completed his Ph.D. at the University of Michigan, Ann Arbor, in 2005. Prior to that, he earned his M.S. degree in Transportation Safety from George Washington University in 2001, following B.S. and M.S. degrees in Civil Engineering from Sharif University in 1996 and 1998 respectively.

== Career ==
Vahidi joined Clemson University's Department of Mechanical Engineering in 2005, where he currently serves as a professor. His research focuses on developing advanced control and estimation algorithms to improve the efficiency and performance of various transportation systems. He has been particularly active in the areas of energy-efficient driving, vehicle connectivity, and autonomous driving technologies.

== Research contributions ==
Throughout his career, Vahidi has made significant contributions to the field of energy-efficient mobility. His research leverages vehicle connectivity to anticipate upcoming energy demands and vehicle autonomy to provide precise control over vehicle motion. By employing real-time optimization techniques, his algorithms can devise motion plans that preserve energy, leading to reduced fuel consumption and emissions. Examples of his work include minimizing idling at urban intersections and optimizing driving behavior in stop-and-go traffic, which not only benefit individual vehicles but also contribute to traffic harmonization and overall energy efficiency.

== Awards and recognition ==
In 2024, he was elected as an IEEE Fellow, one of the highest honors bestowed by the Institute of Electrical and Electronics Engineers. This recognition underscores his exceptional achievements in the control of connected, automated, and hybrid vehicles, as well as his commitment to advancing energy-efficient mobility solutions. He was also promoted to Fellow in The American Society of Mechanical Engineers (ASME) in 2020.
