= Sharif University of Technology mosque =

Mosque in Tehran, Iran

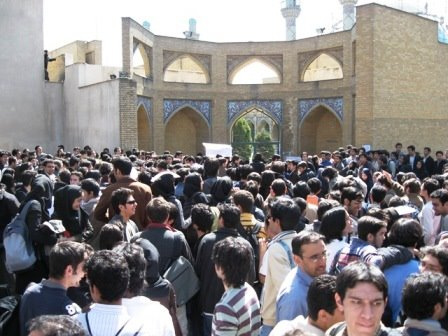
- Students inside the mosque complex in 2006

Religion
- Affiliation: Shia Islam
- Status: Active

Location
- Location: Tehran, Iran

Architecture
- Type: Mosque

The Sharif University of Technology mosque is a mosque on the campus of Sharif University of Technology in Tehran, Iran.

In the context of the 2026 Iran war, the mosque was damaged when the campus was struck on April 6.
