= Iranica (disambiguation) =

Iranica may refer to:

- Encyclopædia Iranica, an encyclopedia about the history, culture, and civilization of Iranian peoples
- Scientia Iranica, an international journal of science and technology
- Acta Iranica, a periodical on Iranian Studies
