= Mohammad Ahmadian =

Iranian politician and academic (1956–2019)

Mohammad Ahmadian PhD
- محمد احمدیان
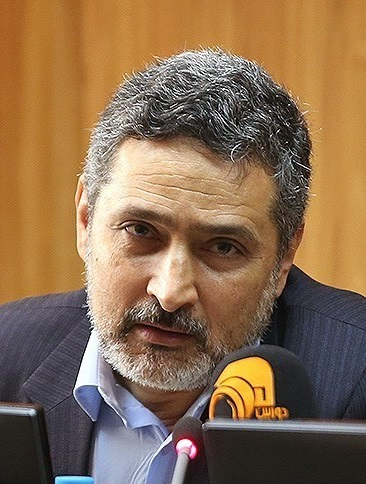

Head of the Atomic Energy Organization Acting
- In office 13 December 2010 – 13 February 2011
- President: Mahmoud Ahmadinejad
- Preceded by: Ali Akbar Salehi
- Succeeded by: Fereydoon Abbasi

Personal details
- Born: 1956 Tehran, Iran
- Died: 18 October 2019 (aged 63) Jamaran, Tehran, Iran

Mohammad Ahmadian (Persian: محمد احمدیان, 1956 – 18 October 2019) was an Iranian politician and academic who served as Deputy Head of the Atomic Energy Organization of Iran. He was also acting Head of the Organization for three weeks after Ali Akbar Salehi became Minister of Foreign Affairs. He was succeeded by Fereydoon Abbasi.

Political offices
Preceded by Ali Akbar Salehi	Head of Atomic Energy Organization; Acting; 2010–2011	Succeeded by Fereydoon Abbasi
