= Hossein Abadian =

Persian Iranologist and historian (born 1962)

- Born: 22 January 1962 (age 64); Lar, Iran
- Occupation: Historian
- Writing career
- Notable works: Backgrounds for formation of Pahlavi reign; Last two decades of Pahlavi dynasty

Hossein Abadian (born January 22, 1962, in Lar, Iran) is a contemporary Persian Iranologist and historian. He was born in Lar, Fars province. He is a professor at the Department of History at Imam Khomeini International University, and also an academic board member of Historia Iranica.

== Career ==
He believes on usage of Phenomenology view in writing. Some of his best known publications are The Role of Religion in the Formation of the Legal System of Modern Iran; The Crisis of Constitutionalism in Iran (1906–1911) (2004); The Biography of Dr Mozaffar Baqa'i (1998); Britain and the Issue of Iran in the Late 19th Century. He wrote the books Backgrounds for formation of Pahlavi reign, investigating general condition of Iran before Reza Shah's kingdom and political social which helped him, and Religious thought and anti-Reggie movement in Iran.

== Education ==
He received his PhD from Shahid Beheshti University, Tehran in June 2004. His thesis deals with the Iranian Constitutional Revolution. Also he earned his BA in Iranian history in 1988 and his MA on the Iranian Constitutional Revolution from the same university in 1991. His research interests deal with Iranian intellectualism, political Shiism and the history of political parties in Iran.
