= Imam Khomeini International University =

International university in Iran

Imam Khomeini International University (Qazvin International University)
- دانشگاه بین المللی امام خمینی; Dāneshgāh-e Beynolmelali emām khomeini
- Imam Khomeini International University
- Motto: شکوفایی علمی، بیداری اسلامی
- Motto in English: Scientific development, Islamic awakening
- Type: Public
- Established: 1984
- Affiliations: IAU; FUIW; ACSSU
- Chancellor: Ali Ghasemzadeh
- Administrative staff: 301
- Students: 8,800
- Undergraduates: 5,489
- Postgraduates: 1,281
- Location: (Iran) Qazvin, Iran; 36°32′N 50°00′E
- Website: ikiu.ac.ir

Imam Khomeini International University (IKIU), informally Qazvin International University, is an international university in Iran that was founded after the Islamic Revolution. The bill of IKIU’s constitution was ratified by the Iranian Parliament in 1984. Constituent organs of IKIU include Board of trustees, president, and council. Deputies for Education, Research, and Students and Culture are some of the other departments.

== History ==
The university was established in 1984 to further culture, civilization, and thought of Muslim world. As an educational, research, and cultural institution under the Ministry of Science, Research and Technology, IKIU has the following aims:

- Furthering and promoting Islamic culture in the Muslim world
- Propagating Islamic culture and thought and science and technology on an international scale
- Introducing grand figures of the Muslim world with the purpose of consolidating Islamic culture
- Taking advantage of innovations and developments in science and technology to the benefit of Iran and other Islamic countries
- Training committed specialists with the purpose of making Islamic countries scientifically and culturally self-reliant
- Contributing toward the development of higher education in Iran

== Status ==
The university offers 30 undergraduate courses and 13 master courses with a faculty of 183 staff teachers. There are 5489 undergraduates and 1281 graduate students.

== Campus ==
The main campus of Imam Khomeini International University is in Qazvin, Iran. There is a Science and Technology Park near the main campus. A residential complex is near the main campus.

=== Buildings ===
==== Main campus ====
- Faculty of Science (Page)
- Faculty of Engineering and Technology (Page)
- Faculty of Literature and Humanity Sciences (Page)
- Faculty of Islamic Sciences and Researches (Page)
- Faculty of Social Sciences (Page)
- Faculty of Architecture and Urban Development (Page)
- Faculty of Futures Studies
- Central Library
- Central Hall
- Professional laboratories
- Restaurant
- Mosque
- Sports hall

==== Residential complex ====
- Persian Language Center (Page)
- Dormitories
- Sports hall
- Soccer field

== Faculty and alumni ==
=== Chancellors ===
Chancellor	Tenure	Alma mater	Speciality
Mohammad Marouf Mashat	1980–1987	(United States) University of Oklahoma* (United Kingdom) University of Leicester	Nuclear Engineering*; Solid-state Physics
Mahmoud Boroujerdi	1987–1988	(Iran) University of Tehran	-
Ali Akbar Salehi	1988–1989	(United States) MIT	Nuclear Engineering
Gholamreza Shirazian	1989–1992	(United States) University of Florida	Civil Engineering
Mohammad Taqikhani	1992–1994	-	Biochemistry
Saeed Sohrabpour	1994–1996	(United States) UC Berkeley	Mechanical Engineering
Rasoul Kazempour	1996–1997	-	Chemistry
Ali Asghar Varsei	1997–2001	(United Kingdom) Manchester University	Mathematics
Mohsen Beheshti Seresht	2001–2004	(Iran) Tarbiat Modarres University	History
Abolhassan Naeini	2004–2006	Iran University of Science and Technology	Civil Engineering
Hassan Ghafouri Fard	2006–2009	(United States) University of Kansas	Nuclear Physics
Abdolali Alebooye Langroodi	2009–2014	(Iran) University of Tehran	Arabic Literature
Abolhassan Naeini	2014–2021	(United States) New Jersey Institute of Technology; Iran University of Science and Technology	Civil Engineering
Ali Ghasemzadeh	2021–present	(Iran) Tarbiat Modares University	Persian Language and Literature

*Unfinished because of Islamic Revolution

=== Notable faculty ===
- Abdolkarim Soroush, as professor of Islamic Philosophy, before leaving the country
- Abolhassan Naeini, associated professor of Civil engineering
- Amirreza Vakilifard, prominent second language educationalist
- Saeid Abbasbandy, professor of mathematics
- Hassan Esmati, teacher of theology and former Iran's cultural attaché in Tunisia
- Alireza Shokouhi, Iranian prominent hydrologist
- Hossein Abadian, professor of Iran's contemporary history

=== Notable alumni ===
- Narges Mohammadi, Iranian human rights activist

== See also ==
- List of Iranian Research Centers
- List of colleges and universities
- Higher education in Iran
- Buein Zahra Technical University
- Academy of Gundishapur
- List of Iranian scientists from the pre-modern era.
- Modern Iranian scientists and engineers
- Education in Iran
- National Library of Iran
- Sarad
- Simorq
