= Sayed Khatiboleslam Sadrnezhaad =

Iranian academic (born 1951)

Sayed Khatiboleslam Sadrnezhaad سید خطیب الاسلام صدرنژاد
- Born: December 9, 1951 (age 74); Tehran, Iran
- Education: Massachusetts Institute of Technology (MIT)
- Known for: Pioneering research in nanomaterials, smart materials, and environmental control in metallurgy
- Awards: Kharazmi's National Research Prize (1988)
- Scientific career
- Fields: Metallurgy; Materials science and engineering
- Workplaces: Sharif University of Technology; Materials and Energy Research Center
- Website: sk.sadrn.com

Sayed Khatiboleslam Sadrnezhaad is a distinguished Iranian professor of materials science and engineering at the Sharif University of Technology. He was named 1% of the world's top scientists by the ESI citation database from Thomson Reuters 2015 and 2016. He holds a research chair position at the Iran National Science Foundation (INSF). His current interest is in the emerging bio-nano and SMA fields of the materials science and engineering discipline.

== Early life and education ==
Sadrnezhaad was born and raised in Tehran. He graduated with distinction, ranking first, with a bachelor's degree from Sharif University of Technology (formerly Aryamehr University of Technology) in July 1974. He then pursued his Ph.D. in the Department of Materials Science and Engineering at the Massachusetts Institute of Technology, completing his degree in February 1979. Under the supervision of John F. Elliott, his Ph.D. research focused on determining the melting rate of DRI pellets in steelmaking slags. Afterward, he continued at MIT as a postdoctoral fellow under Dr. Elliott's guidance, where he investigated sulfur-containing emissions from coal combustion and metallurgical plants.

== Academic career ==
Sadrnezhaad began his academic career in 1979 as Chief of Metallurgical Engineering (Jefe de Ingeniería Metalúrgica) at HYL Tecnología in Monterrey, Nuevo León, Mexico, where he worked for six months following his postdoctoral research at the Massachusetts Institute of Technology (MIT). Returning to Iran in 1980, he joined Sharif University as an assistant professor and simultaneously served as Head of Metallurgical Engineering at the Industrial Development and Independence Headquarters within the Ministry of Industry, Mine and Trade in Tehran until 1981. During this period, he taught in the Department of Materials Science and Engineering at both Isfahan University and Sharif University of Technology.

In 1981, he became chairman of the Materials Committee within the Technical and Engineering Group at the Cultural Revolution Headquarters in Tehran, a position he held until 1985. From 1982 to 1984, he also served as chairman of the Technical and Engineering Group at the same headquarters.

In 1984, Sadrnezhaad was appointed chairman of the Materials Engineering Department at Tarbiat Modares University, a position he held until 1988. During this time, he also served as the research deputy of the Ministry of Science, Research and Technology (Iran), which was known as the Ministry of Culture and Higher Education at the time, from 1985 to 1987. In 1986, he was promoted to associate professor at Sharif University of Technology.

In 1987, he became chancellor of Tarbiat Modares University, serving for one year. He then served as the vice-chancellor of publication affairs at Sharif University of Technology from 1988 to 1989. From 1989 to 1991, Sadrnezhaad returned to MIT as a visiting scientist, furthering his research and strengthening his collaborative ties with the international scientific community. After this experience, he resumed at the Sharif University of Technology. From 1992 to 1995, he was chairman of the Medical Engineering Group at the Janbazan Bioengineering Research Center, and from 1993 to 1995, he served as the dean of graduate studies at the Sharif University of Technology.

In 1995, he achieved the rank of full professor. That same year, he was appointed chancellor of Sharif University of Technology, a position he held until 1997. During this time, he also served as editor-in-chief, International Journal of Engineering (IJE) from 1987 to 2011.

Between 2002 and 2004, he served as the chancellor of the Sadra Institute of Higher Education in Tehran. He was also a member of the editorial board of the Engineering Journal of Ferdowsi University of Mashhad from 1997 to 2001 in Mashhad, and became a member of the editorial board of the Materials Science and Engineering Journal of Iran University of Science and Technology in 2004, a position he still holds.

In 2005, he served as editor-in-chief of the Iranian Journal of Biomedical Engineering until 2009, and in 2008, he began his role as editor-in-chief of the Journal of Engineering Materials, a position he continues to hold today. From 2006 to 2010, he was the director of the Materials and Energy Research Center, based in Karaj.

Since then, he has continued to teach, conduct research, and supervise students at Sharif University, contributing to materials science and engineering.

== Research Areas and Subjects Instructed ==
Sadrnezhaad's research interests encompass a wide range of topics in materials science and metallurgy, including the production, characterization, and medical applications of bionanomaterials and Nanomaterials. He has focused on the study of memory alloys such as Ti-Ni, Cu-Zn-Al, and Cu-Ni-Al, as well as the recovery of precious metals from industrial scraps. His research also includes the extraction of rhenium, molybdenum, vanadium, nickel, magnesium, and manganese, along with environmental control in metallurgical industries. His work in direct smelting, steelmaking, and nodular cast iron production with DRI has advanced understanding in these areas, as well as the microalloying of steel with elements like V, Nb, and Ti. Additionally, he has contributed to research on dephosphorization and desulfurization of steel, as well as the study of sulfur emissions from coal combustion and pyrometallurgical furnaces. His work also covers the vaporization of residual elements from nonferrous mattes and slimes, and the kinetics of leaching of molybdenum oxide and sulfide concentrates. He has explored various methods such as SX, ion exchange, and active carbon for metal extraction.

In addition to his research, Sadrnezhaad has taught a wide variety of subjects, including the thermodynamics of nanomaterials, smart materials, memory alloys, and the thermodynamics of materials. He has also instructed courses on kinetic processes in materials systems, process system analysis and control, and transport phenomena in materials systems. His expertise extends to extractive metallurgy of iron and steel, physical chemistry of materials, and fuel and energy, with a focus on direct reduction of iron and steelmaking. His teaching also includes secondary metallurgy, solidification processing, physics of heat, and the biomedical applications of metals.

== Honors and distinctions ==
- Kharazmi’s National Research Prize (1988) 1367, Tehran, Iran
- Tehran University Academic Book Prize (1993) 1372, Tehran, Iran
- Annual National Book Prize (1995) 1373, Tehran, Iran
- Distinguished Professor (1997) 1375, Sharif University of Technology
- Kharazmi’s Selected Research Project (1998) 1376, Tehran, Iran
- National Selected Book Prize (2001) 1379, Tehran, Iran
- Distinguished Researcher (2002) 1380, Sharif University of Technology
- Tehran University Academic Book Prize (2002) 1381, Tehran, Iran
- World Energy Council and National Energy Committee Authorship Prize (2003) 1382, Tehran, Iran
- Distinguished Researcher (2007) 1386, Sharif University of Technology
- National Distinguished Professor of 1386, Ministry of Science, Research and Technology (2008) Tehran, Iran
- Seventh Rank in Annual Nano Research Prize of 1391 (2012) Tehran, Iran
- Sixth Rank in Annual Nano Research Prize of 1390 (2011) Tehran, Iran
- Forth Rank in Annual Nano Research Prize of 1388 (2009) Tehran, Iran

Academic offices
Preceded by Najafgholi Habibi	Chancellor of Tarbiat Modares University; 1978–1979	Succeeded by Seyed Ahmad Eftekhar Hosseini
Preceded by Mohammad Etemadi	Chancellor of Sharif University of Technology; 1995–1997	Succeeded by Saeed Sohrabpour
