= Helmet (supercar) =

Simurgh

Overview
- Manufacturer: Entop
- Production: 2022 (Prototype)
- Assembly: Afghanistan Technical Vocational Institute (ATVI); Kabul, Afghanistan
- Designer: Mohammad Raza Ahmadi

Body and chassis
- Class: Sports car
- Body style: 2-door coupé
- Layout: Transverse mid-engine, rear-wheel drive

Powertrain
- Engine: Modified 1.8 L 1ZZ-FE I4

Simurgh (Persian: سیمرغ), also reported by other names such as Mada 9, Black Swan, and Helmet, is an economic sport car prototype engineered by Mohammad Raza Ahmadi and produced by ENTOP in Afghanistan. It was shown to the public at Kabul University in late 2022, with assistance from the Afghan IT Ministry and the Innovation Center of Afghanistan. A year later it was displayed at the Geneva International Motor Show. The Simurgh was reported to be running on a modified 1ZZ-FE engine originally intended for a Toyota Corolla from year 2000. The exotic car was developed in more than five years by Ahmadi and his team in the Naw avari (Innovation) Center of the Afghanistan Technical Vocational Institute (ATVI),

The prototype sports an F1-style pushrod suspension and a tube frame chassis composed of lightweight composite materials. The team behind the project has not yet disclosed its production schedule.

== See also ==
- Simorq (car)
