= Mohammad Mahdi Nayebi =

Iranian electrical engineer

- Born: March 11, 1967 (age 58)
- Education: Tarbiat Modarres University (PhD); Sharif University of Technology (BS)
- Known for: works on radar signal processing and pattern recognition
- Awards: Exemplary Professor in International Relations; Exemplary Entrepreneur of the Country; Exemplary Professor; Exemplary Engineer of the Country
- Scientific career
- Fields: electrical engineering
- Institutions: Sharif University of Technology
- Thesis: Detection of Radar Targets in Clutter Plus Noise (1994)
- Website: http://ee.sharif.edu/~nayebi/en/index.html

Mohammad Mahdi Nayebi (born 11 March 1967Qazvin ) is an Iranian electrical engineer and Professor of Electrical Engineering at Sharif University of Technology. He is known for his expertise on detection theory, estimation theory, radar signal processing, pattern recognition, electromagnetic compatibility and communications. Nayebi is a founder of Haamee Institute for Advancement of Humanities and Social Sciences and is featured in the documentary film Alberta Legacy.

== Awards ==
Nayebi was awarded as the Exemplary Entrepreneur of the Country by Ministry of Cooperatives, Labour, and Social Welfare in 2006 and as the Exemplary Engineer of the Country by National Academy of Engineering in 2014. Nayebi is also a Senior Member of the Institute of Electrical and Electronics Engineers.
