= George V. Chilingar =

Armenian-American geologist and academic

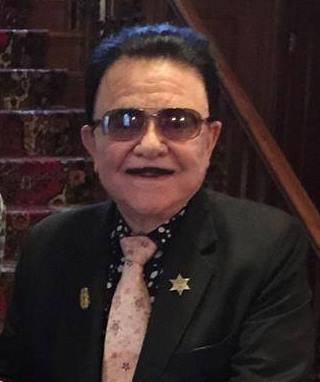
George V. Chilingar

George V. Chilingar (né Chilingarian; July 22, 1929 – March 9, 2023) was an Armenian-American geologist and academic. He was Professor of Civil and Petroleum Engineering at the University of Southern California (USC).

== Early years ==
Chilingarian was born in Tbilisi, Georgia in 1929. He finished high school with honors in Tehran. In the mid-1940s, he emigrated with his family to the United States.

== Career ==
One of the best-known petroleum geologists in the world and the founder of several prestigious journals in the oil and gas industry, Chilingar published 72 books and over 500 of articles on geology, petroleum engineering and environmental engineering. He served as president of the U.S. branch of the Russian Academy of Natural Sciences and 17 of his books have been translated into Russian. In recognition of these contributions, the Russian Academy of Natural Sciences honored him as a Knight of Arts and Sciences.

He received his bachelor's and master's degrees in petroleum engineering and a Ph.D. in geology (with a minor in petroleum engineering), all at USC. Scientia Iranica published a special issue in "Transactions C: Chemistry and Chemical Engineering" dedicated to the lifelong achievements of Chilingar.

He served as senior petroleum engineering adviser to the United Nations from 1967 to 1969, and then again from 1978 to 1987. He was an energy policy adviser to Governor of California Ronald Reagan in 1973.

His recent research work concentrated on:

- Environmental aspects of oil and gas production
- Petrophysical properties of rocks and drilling fluids
- Surface and subsurface operations in petroleum production
- Subsidence due to the fluid withdrawal, testing and storage of petroleum products

== Selected honors and awards ==
- Distinguished Achievement Award for Petroleum Engineering Faculty (The Society of Petroleum Engineers) in recognition for outstanding contributions in the field of petroleum engineering education, 1984
- Society of Petroleum Engineers Distinguished Membership, 2020
- Editor of Sedimentary Geology (one of the founders)
- Special Issue of Energy Sources Journal, Vol. 21, Nov. 1-2, 1999, A Tribute to Professor George V. Chilingarian
- Crown and Eagle Medal of Honor from the Russian Academy of Natural Sciences, 2000
- Gold Medals of Honor from Iran, Thailand, Taiwan, Honduras, El Salvador, Armenia and Russia
- Honorary Professor of Gubkin Russian State University of Oil and Gas

== Death ==
Chilingar died on March 9, 2023 in Culver City, California, aged 93.
