= Simorq (car) =

Simorq PHV (plug-in hybrid vehicle)
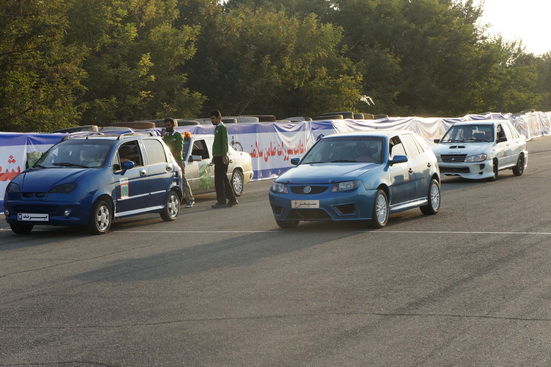
- Simorq attended in 3rd Iranian Machine Design Competition and ranked 1st in industrial design

Overview
- Manufacturer: Imam Khomeini International University
- Production: 2008

Body and chassis
- Class: Subcompact
- Body style: 5-door
- Layout: Front-engine, front-wheel-drive

The Simorq or Simorgh (Persian: سیمرغ) is the first hybrid car designed and produced in Iran. It was designed by students of Imam Khomeini International University. The vehicle was entered in the 3rd Iranian Machine Design Competition and ranked 1st in industrial design and technical design.

== See also ==
- Helmet (supercar)
