= Ali Asghar Varsei =

Ali Asghar Varsehei

8th Chancellor of Imam Khomeini International University
- In office 1997–2001
- Preceded by: Dr. Rasoul Kazempour
- Succeeded by: Dr. Mohsen Beheshti Seresht

Personal details
- Education: University of Manchester
- Profession: Assistant professor, University of Gilan

Dr. Ali Asghar Varsehei (Persian: علی‌اصغر ورسه‌ای) is an Iranian academic and the 8th chancellor of Imam Khomeini International University from 1997 to 2001.

He graduated from University of Manchester and received his Ph.D. in Mathematics in 1978.

Academic offices
Preceded by Rasoul Kazempour	Chancellor of Imam Khomeini International University; 1997-2001	Succeeded by Mohsen Beheshti Seresht
