= Abolhassan Naeini =

Iranian academic

Chancellor of Imam Khomeini International University
- In office 2014–2021
- Preceded by: Dr. Abdolali Alebooye Langroodi
- Succeeded by: Dr. Ali Ghasemzadeh

Personal details
- Born: 1955 (age 70–71) Qazvin, Iran
- Education: New Jersey Institute of Technology; Iran University of Science and Technology
- Profession: Professor, Imam Khomeini International University

Dr. Abolhassan Naeini (Persian: ابوالحسن نائینی, born 1955 in Qazvin) is an Iranian academic and the former chancellor of Imam Khomeini International University from 2004 to 2006 and also from 2014 to 2021.

He graduated from New Jersey Institute of Technology and later received his Ph.D. in Civil Engineering from Iran University of Science and Technology.

Naeini was the only chancellor of the university who was elected as by faculty member. Since President Mahmoud Ahmadinejad took office in 2005 this method changed and again all university chancellors were selected by government, so after one year, in 2006 Dr. Hassan Ghafouri Fard a member of Islamic Coalition Party was appointed as his successor by Ministry of Science, Research and Technology.

Academic offices
Preceded by Mohsen Beheshti Seresht	Chancellor of Imam Khomeini International University; 2004-2006	Succeeded by Hassan Ghafouri Fard
Preceded by Abdolali Alebooye Langroodi	Chancellor of Imam Khomeini International University; 2014-2021	Succeeded by Ali Ghasemzadeh
