= Sarad =

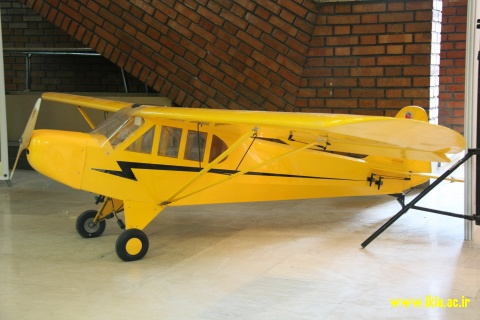

General information
- Type: Unmanned Aerial Vehicle
- Manufacturer: Sarad group, Imam Khomeini International University
- Status: In development

History
- Introduction date: 2011
- First flight: 2011

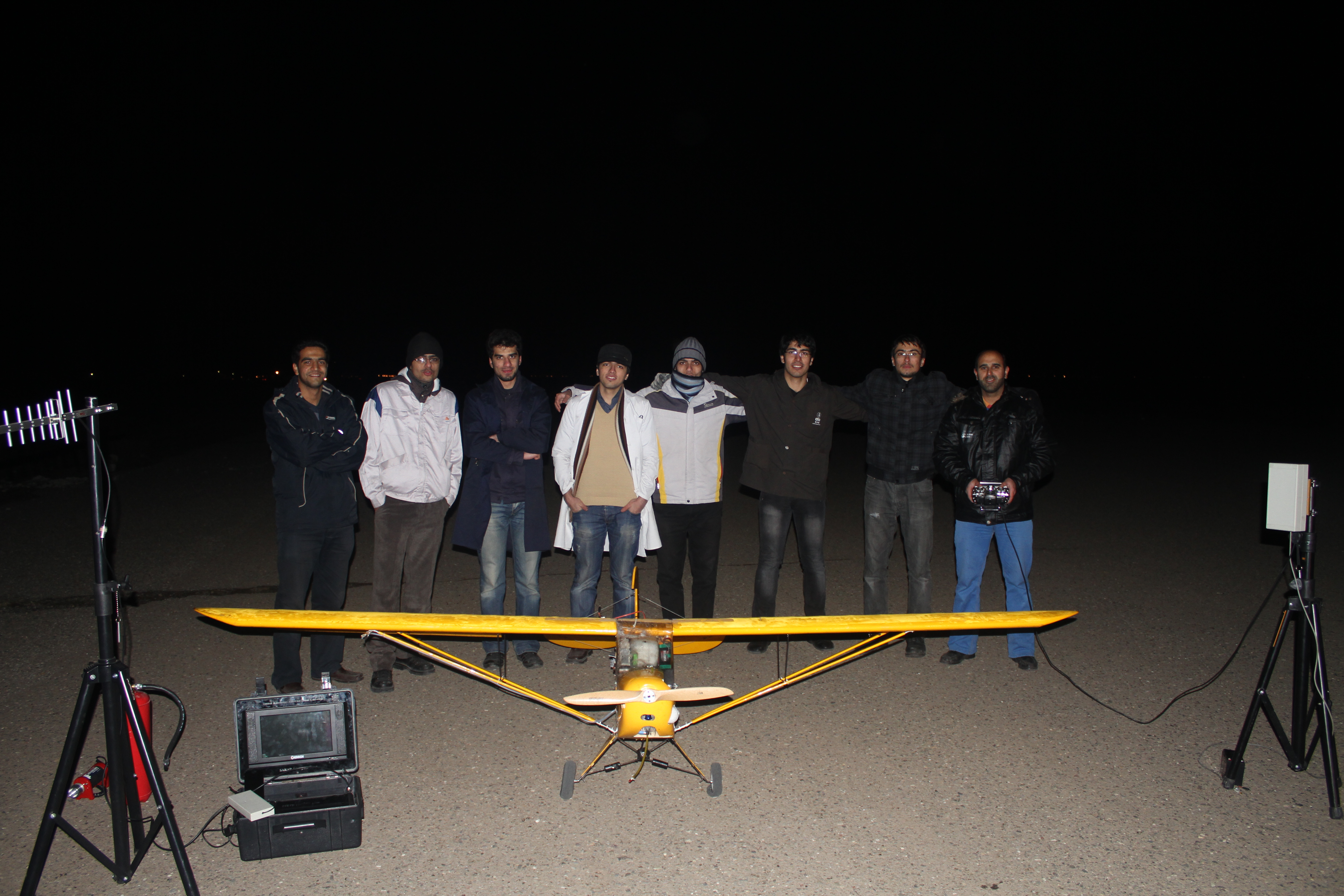
Sarad group

Sarad is an unmanned aerial vehicle (UAV) designed by a group of Mechanical engineers (Sarad group) at Imam Khomeini International University.

Sarad could rank second in 2nd National UAV Design and Construction Contest held in Sharif University of Technology among 46 contestants from state and Azad universities.

== See also ==
- Unmanned aerial vehicle
- List of unmanned aerial vehicles
- Unmanned Aircraft System
- Aerospace engineering
- Imam Khomeini International University
