= Nezam Mahdavi-Amiri =

Iranian mathematician

‌Nezam Mahdavi-Amiri
- نظام‌الدین مهدوی امیری
- Born: August 11, 1952 (age 73)
- Education: Johns Hopkins University (PhD)
- Scientific career
- Fields: mathematics
- Institutions: Sharif University of Technology
- Thesis: Generally Constrained Nonlinear Least Squares and Generating Nonlinear Programming Test Problems: Algorithmic Approach (1981)
- Doctoral advisor: Richard Harold Bartels

Nezameddin (Nezam) Mahdavi-Amiri (born August 11, 1952) is an Iranian mathematician and Distinguished Professor of Mathematics at Sharif University of Technology. He is known for his works on Computational Optimization, Scientific Computing, Matrix Computations, Mathematical Software and Fuzzy Optimization.
