= Alireza Shokoohi =

Iranian hydrologist

- Born: Iran
- Education: University of Tehran; University of Oklahoma
- Known for: Data-flow analysis Spatial analysis
- Scientific career
- Fields: Civil engineer Hydrologist
- Workplaces: Imam Khomeini International University

Alireza Shokoohi is an Iranian hydrologist, Professor at Imam Khomeini International University and guest researcher at the University of Oklahoma. He is best known for his innovative methods in analysis of fluids, water resource management, and investigation of climate change which mostly deals with using mathematical methods in analysis of flood alarm system.

== Education ==
He received a Master of Science degree in September 1988 and a PhD in February 2001 from University of Tehran. The title of his thesis was Developing a Hydraulic based Rainfall Runoff mathematical model in GIS environment for using in flood warning system.

== Career ==
His career is mostly concentrated on his researches and scientific works in both Iran and United States. In 2010 Shokoohi could correct Meso-Scale hydrological Model in NOAA as the guest researcher of University of Oklahoma.
