= Amirreza Vakilifard =

- Born: Amirreza Vakilifard; Tehran, Iran

Amirreza Vakilifard in Education Sciences (Second Languages Didactics) from the University of Montreal in Canada in 2007. He is the founding member of the first-ever Persian Language teaching department aimed at foreign learners in Iran. He has been teaching Persian language to foreign students since 1996 at the Imam Khomeini International University (IKIU) in Qazvin, Iran.

He established the M.A. program in Persian Language Didactics at the IKIU since 2014 and has been teaching the above program at other Iranian universities, including Allameh Tabatabyi, Beheshti, Payam-e Noor since 2010. For the first time in Iran, Dr. Vakilifard initiated and designed the Bachelor (B.A) program in “Teaching Persian Language” to foreign and Iranian students. This required designing syllabi and determining the goals and the teaching resources for the program's 70 specialized, compulsory, and optional courses. He was the Deputy-Director of the Persian Language Center at IKIU from 1995 to 2002 and again from 2011 to 2013, and he has been appointed as the Director of the Persian Language Center of the IKIU since 2013. In 2011, he established the "Journal of Teaching Persian to Speakers of Other Languages", Iran's first academic periodical in the field, in which he serves as Director-in-Charge and Editor-in-Chief until 2020. Dr. Vakilifard is a frequent speaker at conferences and conducts regular workshops for Persian language teachers in Iran and abroad.

In 2017, Dr. Vakilifard designed and founded SAMFA (Persian acronym for standard assessment test of Persian language skills) that is the most widely-used test of proficiency in Persian language. He provided the scientific framework and supporting documents for the test. The test has been repeatedly administered in Iran and simultaneously, in five other countries.

== Published works ==
He has produced over 60 books and articles in Persian, French and English. Many of his books and articles are in the field of learning and teaching Persian as a second language. Among his well-known books are:

- Fārsināme - Starter Level. Student's Book (2020).
- Fārsināme - Starter Level. Workbook (2020).
- Fārsināme for Medical Sciences, Semi-specialized Persian Language for Medical Sciences Students - Advanced Level. (2020, with Z. Sedighifar and M. Galledari).
- Fārsināme for social Sciences, Semi-specialized Persian Language for Social Sciences Students - Advanced Level. (2020, with M. B. Mirzaei and H. Bahrami).
- Persian Framework of Reference for teaching Persian to Speakers of Other Languages: Grammar, Vocabulary and Functions for Elementary, Intermediate and Advanced Levels (2016, with M. Mirdehghan, Z. Montazeri and F. Bagheri);
- Beat of life, Improving semi-specialized vocabulary and comprehension of Persian language for medical purposes- Upper-intermediated Level (2016, with collaboration of Z. Sedighifar and M. Galledari);
- Pulse of life, Improving semi-specialized vocabulary and comprehension of Persian language for medical purposes- intermediated Level (2016, with collaboration of Z. Sedighifar and M. Galledari),
- Reading Comprehension of Persian texts for international advanced learners (2002, with R. Madani);
- Persian Language for International Medical Students (2002, with M. Galledari);
- Persian language for international engineering students (2002, with M. Galledari)…

In 2017, Dr. Vakilifard received the award for International Activities of the Persian Language Center of the International University in Qazvin. In the same year, he has been awarded the “Book of the Year Award of Qazvin Province” for the book titled: “Persian Framework of Reference: Grammar, Vocabulary and Functions (For Elementary, Intermediate & Advanced Levels)”. Dr. Vakilifard was chosen “Distinguished Professor of the academic year” among the professors of the IKIU, in 2012, 2017 and 2020. He received the awards for “the Excellent Researcher of the academic year” among the professors of the IKIU, in 2002, 2016, 2017, 2018 and 2020.
