= Saeid Abbasbandy =

Iranian mathematician and academic

- Born: March 17, 1967 (age 59); Tehran
- Education: University for Teacher Education
- Known for: Computational Mathematics, Fuzzy Numerical Analysis,
- Awards: CNSNS, top cited paper AMM, top cited paper
- Scientific career
- Fields: Mathematician
- Workplaces: Imam Khomeini International University
- Doctoral advisor: Esmail Babolian

Saeid Abbasbandy is an Iranian mathematician and university professor at Imam Khomeini International University. Abbasbandy was born on March 17, 1967, in Tehran. He finished his high school course in Shariati High School and attended in the university entrance exam, then could enter University of Tehran.

His paper "Homotopy analysis method for quadratic Riccati differential equation" was singled out by Science Watch as a "Hot Paper in Mathematics" in March 2009. Abbasbandy is editor-in-chief of a non-profit journal, Communications in Numerical Analysis.

== Education ==
He received a Master of Science degree in September 1991 and a PhD in February 1996 from Kharazmi University. The title of his thesis was Numerical Galerkin Methods for Integral Equations of the First kind.
