= Alireza Mehran =

Dr. Alireza Mehran (Persian: علیرضا مهران) was chancellor of Sharif University of Technology from 1977 to 1978.

Dr. Mehran has a Ph.D. in Biophysics from University of Geneva. He was the Vice-president in charge of planning for the Isfahan Campus, before he was appointed President in 1977. But it was a tough time and fraught with daunting challenges. Dr. Mehran tried to persuade the government to accept alternatives to the relocation of the University to Isfahan, but to no avail. The Ministry of Science and Higher Education excluded Aryamehr University of Technology in Tehran from participation in the country-wide university entrance examination for the academic year 1978-79. Faculty chose to conduct the entrance examination without government's consent.

Finally the faculty's resistance and open strike, unprecedented in Iran, combined with the pre-revolutionary conditions in the country, forced the government to give up its plan to relocate of the Aryamehr University of Technology from Tehran. The Isfahan University of Technology was accredited as a separate entity in 1978.

Dr. Mohammad Amin, Faculty member of the Structural Engineering Department (Sazeh) was appointed as the first President of the Isfahan University of Technology. Prior to his appointment Dr. Mohammad Amin was Vice-president for the Isfahan Campus.

Academic offices
Preceded by Mehdi Zarghamee	Chancellor of Sharif University of Technology; 1977-1978	Succeeded by Hossein Ali Anvari
