= Ali Akbar Salehi =

Iranian politician

- علی‌اکبر صالحی
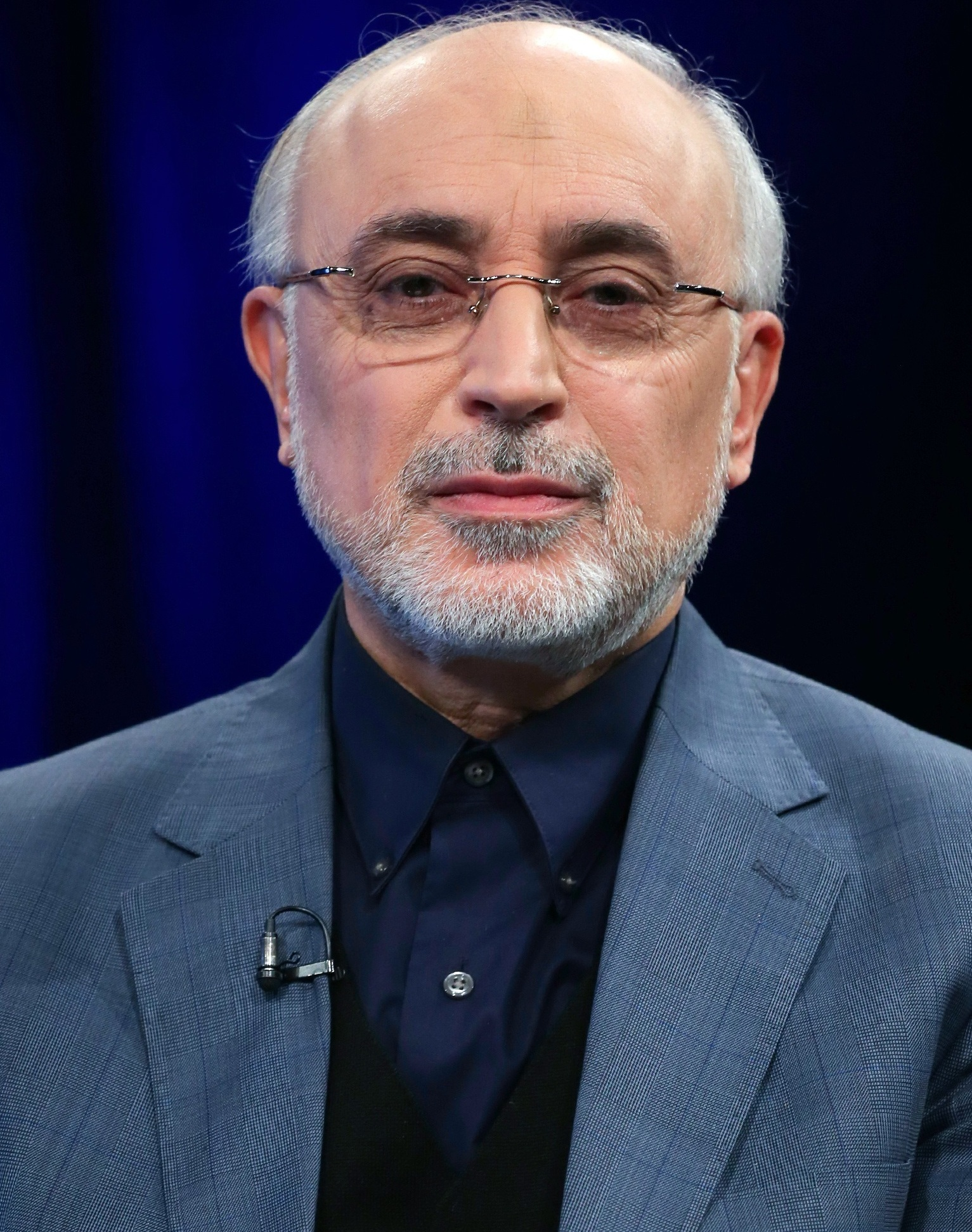
- Salehi in 2021

6th Head of the Atomic Energy Organization of Iran
- In office 16 August 2013 – 29 August 2021
- President: Hassan Rouhani
- Preceded by: Fereydoon Abbasi
- Succeeded by: Mohammad Eslami
- In office 16 July 2009 – 13 December 2010
- President: Mahmoud Ahmadinejad
- Preceded by: Gholam Reza Aghazadeh
- Succeeded by: Mohammad Ahmadian (acting)

Minister of Foreign Affairs of Iran
- In office 30 January 2011 – 15 August 2013; Acting: 13 December 2010 – 30 January 2011
- President: Mahmoud Ahmadinejad
- Preceded by: Manouchehr Mottaki
- Succeeded by: Mohammad Javad Zarif

Personal details
- Born: 24 March 1949 (age 77) Karbala, Kingdom of Iraq
- Spouse: Zahra Rad
- Children: 3
- Awards: Order of Courage (1st class); Order of Service (2nd class)
- Academic background and work
- Fields: Nuclear engineering; nuclear physics
- Alma mater: American University of Beirut; Massachusetts Institute of Technology
- Thesis: Resonance Region Neutronics of Unit Cells in Fast and Thermal Reactors (1977)
- Doctoral advisor: Michael J. Driscoll
- Institutions: Sharif University of Technology; Imam Khomeini International University

Ali Akbar Salehi (Persian: علی‌اکبر صالحی, Persian pronunciation; born 24 March 1949) is an Iraqi-born Iranian academic, diplomat and former head of the Atomic Energy Organization of Iran, who served in this position from 2009 to 2010 and also from 2013 to 2021. He served for the first time as head of the AEOI from 2009 to 2010 and was appointed to the post for a second time on 16 August 2013. Before the appointment of his latter position, he was foreign affairs minister from 2010 to 2013. He was also the Iranian representative in the International Atomic Energy Agency from 1998 to 2003.

== Early life and education ==
Salehi was born in Karbala, Iraq, on 24 March 1949, to Persian parents. His father, a merchant in Karbala, was born in Qazvin and much of his family had lived in Karbala for over 200 years, having had a family house there before it was demolished. Salehi spoke Persian with his family and learned Arabic from playing with other children in the alleyways. Besides Persian and Arabic, Salehi is fluent in English. He attended an Iranian school in Iraq. Salehi would also peddle cigarettes on the streets of Karbala as a child for pocket money. In 1958, when Abd al-Karim Qasim overthrew King Faisal II, his family moved to Iran, having visited there on a family trip. In Iran, his classmates would tease him for his accent and insult him. He failed his exams his first year of primary school. After initially wanting to move to Damascus, Syria, he eventually moved to Beirut, Lebanon where he finished secondary school. He received a Bachelor of Science degree in physics from the American University of Beirut in 1971 and a PhD in nuclear engineering from the Massachusetts Institute of Technology in 1977.

== Career ==
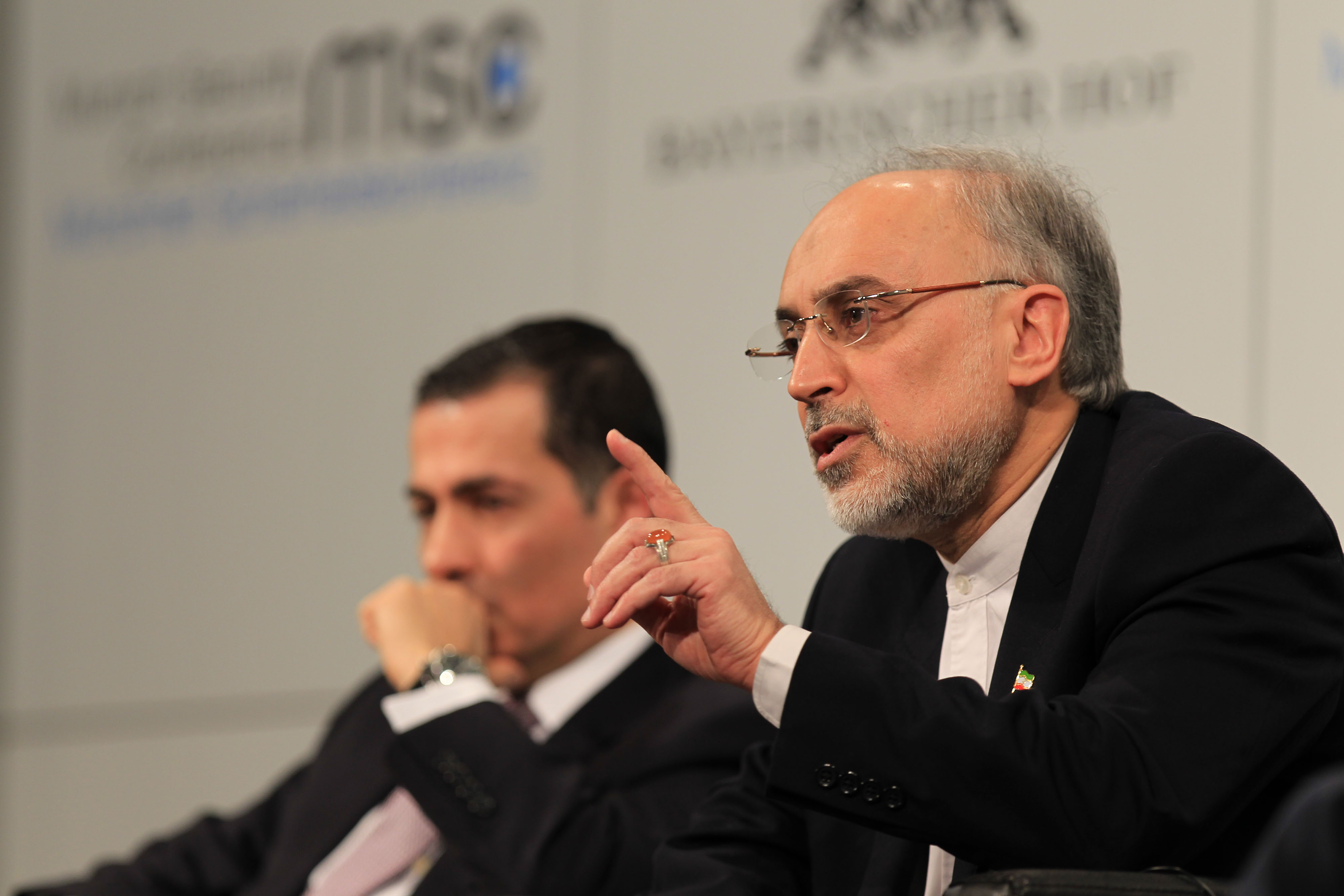
Salehi speaking at Munich Security Conference

Salehi is full professor and was chancellor of the Sharif University of Technology and a member of the Academy of Sciences of Iran and the International Centre for Theoretical Physics in Italy. He served as the chancellor of the Sharif University of Technology from 1982 to 1985 and once again from 1989 to 1993. While chancellor, Salehi was involved in an attempt to obtain dual-use technologies from a European supplier, according to David Albright of the Institute for Science and International Security, citing some 1,600 telex documents from the 1990s. He was also chancellor of Imam Khomeini International University for two years (1988–1989).

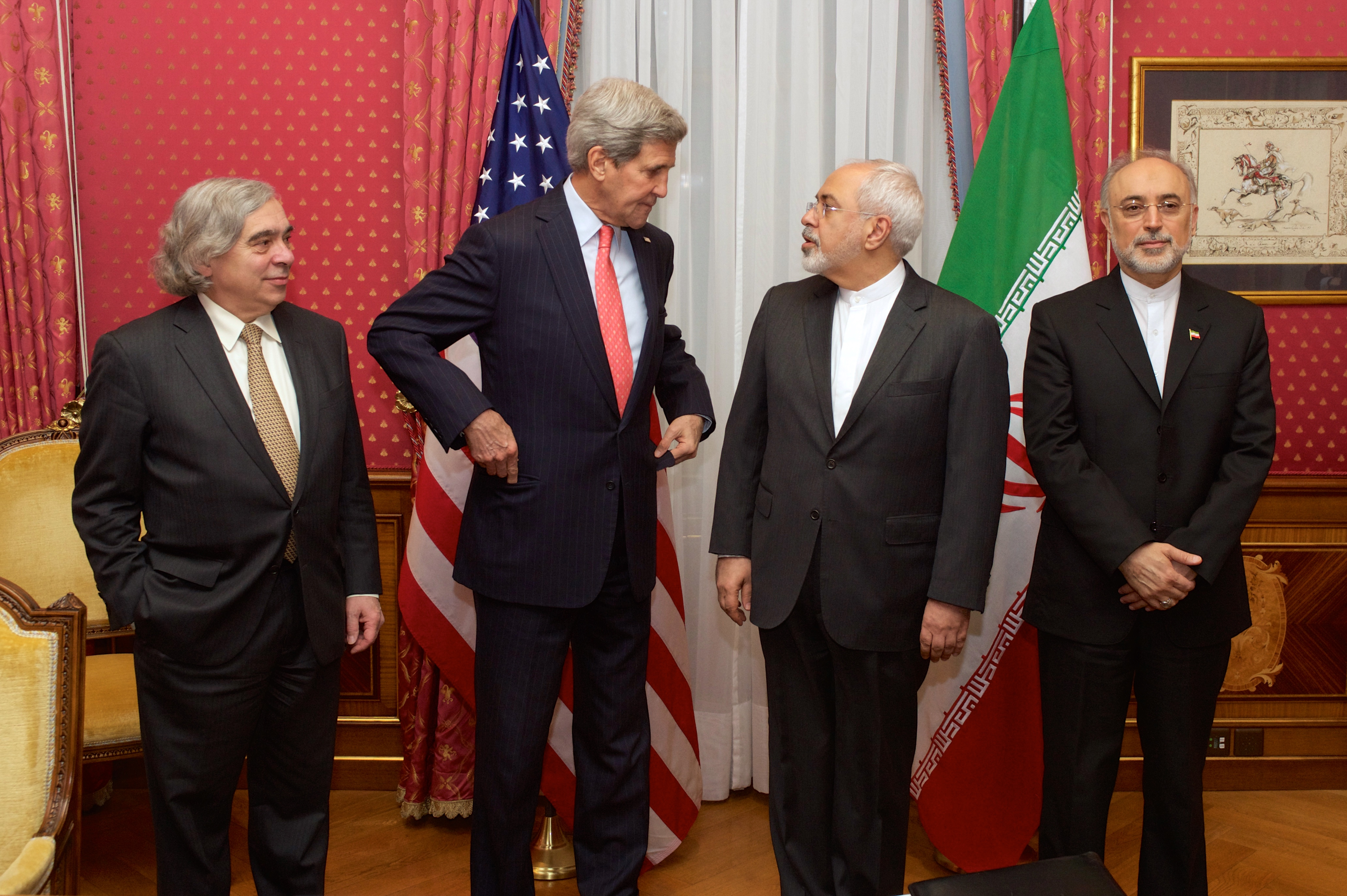
Salehi as head of the Atomic Energy Organization of Iran along with FM Zarif, U.S. Secretary of State John Kerry and Secretary of Energy Ernest Moniz, in the "Salon Élysée" of the Beau-Rivage Palace (Lausanne, Switzerland), 16 March 2015

An ISIS (Institute for Science and International Security) report claims the Physics Research Center acted as a front in the late 1980s and early 1990s to obtain illicit nuclear technologies. ISIS claims that, as head of Sharif University, Salehi was aware of purchases.

Salehi was appointed permanent representative of Iran to the International Atomic Energy Agency by the then president Mohammad Khatami on 13 March 1997 and remained in the post until 22 August 2005. On 18 December 2003, Salehi signed the Additional Protocol to the safeguard agreement, on behalf of Iran. He was replaced by Pirooz Hosseini.

Salehi was deputy secretary-general of the Organisation of the Islamic Conference under Ekmeleddin İhsanoğlu from 2007 to 2009. He resigned on 16 July 2009 when then President Mahmoud Ahmadinejad appointed Salehi as the new head of Iran's Atomic Energy Organization, replacing Gholam Reza Aghazadeh who resigned on 10 July. Salehi resigned from office on 23 January 2011 when Ahmadinejad nominated him as foreign minister.

On 13 December 2010, Ahmadinejad dismissed Manouchehr Mottaki for unknown reasons and appointed Salehi in an acting capacity. On 23 January 2011, Ahmadinejad nominated Salehi to become foreign minister. The Iranian Parliament voted for him on 30 January and he became the foreign minister of Iran, gaining 146 positive votes. The European Union and the Treasury of the United Kingdom had put Salehi into the sanction list as an asset freeze target on 18 November 2009 due to his previous involvement in the nuclear program of Iran. The EU waived this designation when he became foreign minister in 2010. His term as foreign minister ended on 15 August 2013 when Mohammad Javad Zarif took the position in the elected President Hassan Rouhani's government. A day after, Rouhani appointed Salehi as head of Atomic Energy Organization for a second time on 16 August 2013. Salehi replaced Fereydoon Abbasi in the post.

=== Sanctions ===
As the head of the AEOI when Iran was facing increased scrutiny in light of International Atomic Energy Agency findings, Salehi was designated for financial sanctions and travel restrictions by the European Union and the United Kingdom. Salehi and Ernest Moniz joined 2015 Geneva Iran and P5+1 nuclear talks to discuss more about technical aspects of Iran nuclear program. Salehi has been selected among the ten people who mattered in the year 2015 by Nature magazine because of his role in nuclear talks. As the head of the AEOI, Salehi also was designated for secondary sanctions imposed by the United States Department of the Treasury.

== See also ==
- Fordow Fuel Enrichment Plant
- List of Iranian officials
- Atomic Energy Organization of Iran

Diplomatic posts
Preceded by Mohammad Sadegh Ayatollahi	Ambassador of Iran to the IAEA; 1998–2003	Succeeded by Pirooz Hosseini
Political offices
Preceded by Gholam Reza Aghazadeh	Head of Atomic Energy Organization; 2009–2010	Succeeded by Mohammad Ahmadian (acting)
Preceded by Manouchehr Mottaki	Minister of Foreign Affairs; 2010–2013	Succeeded by Mohammad Javad Zarif
Preceded by Fereydoon Abbasi	Head of Atomic Energy Organization; 2013–2021	Succeeded by Mohammad Eslami
Academic offices
Preceded by Abbas Anvari	Chancellor of Sharif University of Technology; 1982–1985	Succeeded by Abbas Anvari
Preceded by Mahmoud Boroujerdi	Chancellor of Imam Khomeini International University; 1988–1989	Succeeded by Gholamreza Shirazian
Preceded by Abbas Anvari	Chancellor of Sharif University of Technology; 1989–1993	Succeeded by Mohammad Etemadi
