= Saeed Sohrabpour =

Chancellor of Sharif University of Technology
- In office 1997–2010
- Preceded by: Sayed Khatiboleslam Sadrnezhaad
- Succeeded by: Reza Roosta Azad

Chancellor of Imam Khomeini International University
- In office 1994–1996
- Preceded by: Mohammad Taqikhani
- Succeeded by: Rasoul Kazempour

Personal details
- Born: 1943 (age 82–83) Tehran, Iran
- Education: University of Tehran; University of California, Berkeley
- Profession: Professor, Sharif University of Technology
- Website: sharif.ir/~saeed/

Saeed Sohrabpour (Persian: سعيد سهراب پور, born in 1943 in Tehran), Full Professor of the Faculty of Mechanical Engineering at Sharif University of Technology, has been the vice president and chief adviser of Islamic Republic of Iran's National Elites Foundation since 2011. He has also been elected as Iranian Science and Culture Hall of Fame and was the chancellor of Sharif University of Technology from 1997 to 2010. He is a member of the board of trustees of Iran's National Library and Archives of I.R.. Furthermore, during his professional life, Sohrabpour has published prolific scientific papers in various high-ranked journals. Prof Sohrabpour is the president of Research Institute for Science, Technology and Industry Policy Making at the Sharif University of Technology, the chairman of the board for Iran Most Admired Knowledge Enterprise Award (MAKE), Center for Knowledge-based Management, and the chairman of the board for Iran EFQM Representative as well. Besides various honors and awards, he has been a fellow of Academy of Sciences of the Islamic Republic of Iran.

== Early life ==
Saeed Sohrabpour was born in Tehran, Iran, in 1943. In 1965, having completed his bachelor's in mechanical engineering with the top grade in Tehran University, College of Engineering, he was awarded a scholarship from Iran's government. He continued his education with an M.S. and Ph.D. level in mechanical engineering at The University of California, Berkeley.

== Career ==
After returning to Iran in 1971, he started teaching at the University of Shiraz, faculty of mechanical engineering, as an assistant professor. To spend his first sabbatical, he was admitted to the University of California at Los Angeles in 1976. He was the vice chancellor for student affairs and later took over the position of vice chancellor for development at University of Shiraz in 1978-1981.

Sohrabpour became the vice president of Imam Khomeini International University while he was transferring as an associate professor and faculty member to the Sharif University of Technology in 1989. Having completed his second sabbatical in 1990 at the University of New Mexico, he was appointed to the development vice chancellor of the Ministry of Health and Medical Education and a member of the Academy of Sciences. In 1994 he was appointed construction vice chancellor for the Ministry of Culture and Higher Education. Sohrabpour was elected president of Imam Khomeini International University in 1995. In 1997 he was appointed vice president for the Ministry of Culture and Higher Education.

In 1998, the Minister of Culture and Higher Education appointed Sohrabpour as the president of Sharif University of Technology, recommended by the university's faculty members, and stayed in the position from 1997 to 2010 until his resignation. He is the only president of a public university in Iran to keep the position in more than one governmental presidency for several years and terminate his official role upon his own decision. This demonstrates his positive contribution to the advancement of the university and his high position among all parties and communities in Iran. Many experts believe that during his university presidency, the University had high stability and an upward trend that paved the way for the university to develop in terms of scientific, cultural, educational, and physical features and turned it as the country's highest education index.

Sohrabpour was the head of the mechanical engineering group in the Academy of Sciences in 1998. He is also the chairman of the board for Iran Most Admired Knowledge Enterprise Award (MAKE), Center for Knowledge-based Management since 2011 and Iran EFQM Representative since 2016 that are helping and guiding more than 500 Iranian companies. Sohrabpour is also the president of Research Institute for Science, Technology and Industry Policy Making at the Sharif University of Technology. He is a member of the board of trustees of Iran's National Library and Archives of I.R. Sohrabpour has published many scientific papers.

In February 2019, Sohrabpour was elected a foreign associate of the US National Academy of Engineering "for establishing Sharif University as an academic Center of Excellence and advancing engineering and science education in Iran."

Academic offices
| Preceded by Mohammad Taqikhani | Chancellor of Imam Khomeini International University; 1994–1996 | Succeeded by Rasoul Kazempour |
| Preceded by Sayed Khatiboleslam Sadrnezhaad | Chancellor of Sharif University of Technology; 1997–2010 | Succeeded by Reza Roosta Azad |
