= Abbas Anvari =

Iranian physicist (1944–2025)

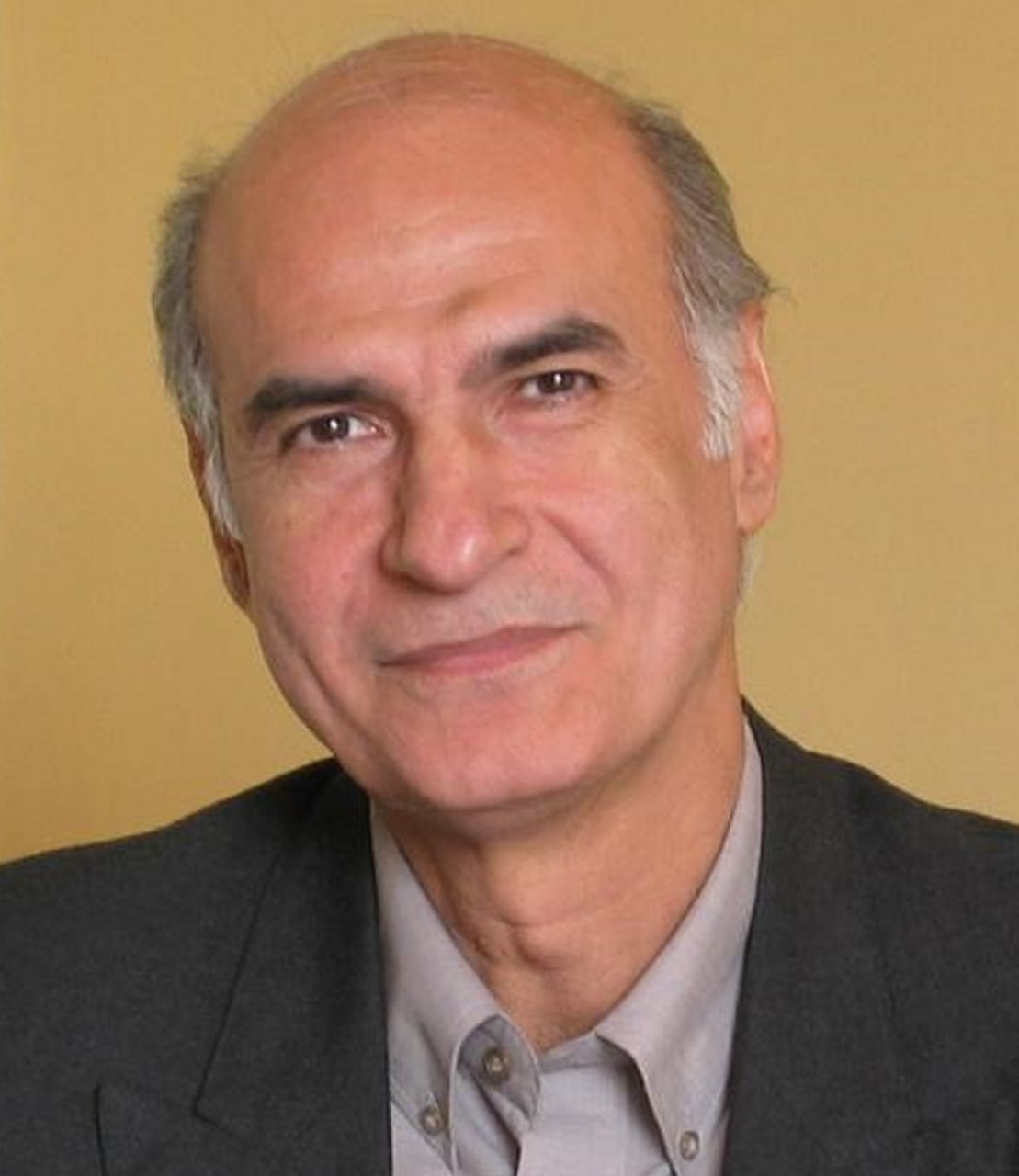
Abbas Anvari

Abbas Anvari (Persian: عباس انواری; 6 March 1944 – 12 July 2025) was an Iranian academic who was a professor of physics.

== Life and career ==
Born on 6 March 1944, he earned a Ph.D. in physics from Chalmers University of Technology in Gothenburg, Sweden. Anvari served as the chancellor of Sharif University of Technology in Tehran, Iran for two terms: 1980–1982 and 1985–1989. He died on 12 July 2025, at the age of 81.

Academic offices
Preceded by Ali Mohammad Ranjbar	Chancellor of Sharif University of Technology; 1980–1982	Succeeded by Ali Akbar Salehi
Preceded by Ali Akbar Salehi	Chancellor of Sharif University of Technology; 1985–1989	Succeeded by Ali Akbar Salehi
