= Hassan Esmati =

Iranian Quran scholar

Seyed Hassan Esmati, Iranian Quran scholar was born in Torbat-e Heydarieh, Razavi Khorasan province and has a Ph.D. in Quran and Hadith knowledge from Imam Sadeq University. He is Iran's cultural attaché in Senegal. He also served the position in Tunisia for four years (2007–11).

== Published works ==
=== Books ===
- Sufism in North Africa, Collected articles with research approaches titled as Sufism in North Africa has been supported by International Centre for Cultural Studies. This collection tries to introduce the revolutions in Egypt and Tunisia.
