= Scientia Iranica =

- Discipline: Science and Technology
- Language: English
- Edited by: R. Naghdabadi

Publication details
- History: 1991-present
- Publisher: Sharif University of Technology (Iran)
- Frequency: 22/year
- Open access: Yes
- Impact factor: 1.9 (2024)

Standard abbreviations
- ISO 4: Sci. Iran.

Indexing
- ISSN: 1026-3098 (print); 2345-3605 (web)
- OCLC no.: 43453436

Links
- Journal homepage; Online access

Scientia Iranica is a peer-reviewed scientific journal published by Sharif University of Technology (Tehran, Iran). It was established in 1991 and covers theoretical and experimental research in technical sciences and engineering. Starting in 2011, the journal is published open access. The editor-in-chief is Reza Naghdabadi (Sharif University of Technology).

== Background ==
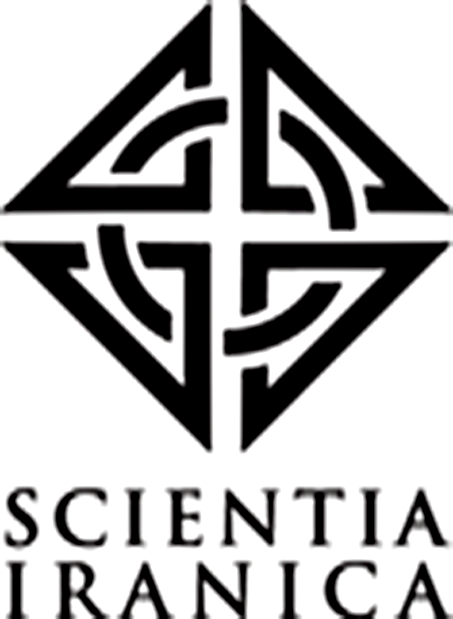
Official logo of Scientia Iranica

The journal is divided in 6 sections called "Transactions".

=== Transactions A: Civil Engineering ===
This section covers civil engineering, which includes, but is not limited to, structural engineering, engineering materials, coastal and harbor engineering, construction management, environmental engineering, geotechnical engineering, highway engineering, information technology, railroad engineering, surveying and geospatial engineering, transportation engineering, tunnel engineering and water engineering. Emphasis is on analytical, experimental and numerical works. Transactions A is published bimonthly.

=== Transactions B: Mechanical Engineering ===
This section covers mechanical engineering, which includes, but is not limited to, aerodynamics, automation and control, biomechanics, design and manufacturing, fluid and hydromechanics, kinematics and dynamic systems, mechanics of continua, mechanisms and robotics, mechatronics, microelectromechanical systems, and thermal systems. Emphasis is on analytical, experimental, and numerical works. Transaction B is published twice a year.

=== Transactions C: Chemistry and Chemical Engineering ===
This section is divided into two subsections: "Chemistry" and "Chemical Engineering". It covers all aspects of applied and theoretical chemistry. Transactions C is published biannually.

Scientia Iranica has published a special issue in this section dedicated to the lifelong achievements of George V. Chilingar.

=== Transactions D: Computer Science & Engineering and Electrical Engineering ===
This section is also divided into two subsections: "Computer Science & Engineering" and "Electrical Engineering". The first covers computer science and engineering, which includes, but is not limited to, artificial intelligence, compilers, computer architectures, computer dependability and security, computer networks and distributed systems, data management, design automation and configurable computing, digital signal processing, embedded systems, operating systems, processor and system architectures, real-time systems, soft computing, software engineering, theoretical computer science, verification, test and design for test.

The second subsection covers electrical engineering, which includes, but is not limited to, information theory, encryption secure communications, wireless communications, satellite and radar, control systems, quantum electronic devices, microelectronics, RF integrated circuits and systems, biomedical engineering and imaging, power electronics, energy management systems, photonics, nanophotonics, electromagnetic, antenna and propagation, optical networks and communications, communication theory, and data networks.

The subsection on electrical engineering has published special issues dedicated to the lifelong achievements of John G. Webster and Lotfi A. Zadeh. Transactions D is published twice a year.

=== Transactions E: Industrial Engineering ===
This section covers recent advances in industrial engineering theory, techniques, methodology applications and practice, which includes, but is not limited to, operations research and decision-making models, quality engineering, production and inventory control, artificial intelligence in industrial engineering, engineering economy and cost estimation, facilities design and location, maintenance and reliability engineering, materials handling, performance analysis, discrete event system simulation, project control and management, work measurement and methods engineering, heuristics and meta-heuristics, resource optimization, applied statistics, manufacturing processes and designs, human factors and ergonomics and information systems. Transaction E is published bimonthly.

=== Transactions F: Nanotechnology ===
Transactions F (also known as Scientia Nanotechnology) was established in 2010. It covers research in nanoscience and nanotechnology and especially those of an interdisciplinary nature in the areas of structures, materials, and devices with nanometer-scale. Special emphasis is placed on applications in the areas of health and medicine, energy, environment, transportation, and construction.

== Abstracting and indexing ==
Scientia Iranica is abstracted and indexed by Aquatic Sciences and Fisheries Abstracts, Cambridge Scientific Abstracts, Chemical Abstracts, Compendex, Current Mathematical Publications, Health and Safety Science Abstracts, Islamic World Science Citation Center, Journal Citation Reports, MathSciNet, Regional Information Center for Science and Technology, Pollution Abstracts, ProQuest Environmental Science, Science Citation Index Expanded, Scientific Information Database, Scopus, Scimago and Zentralblatt MATH.

== See also ==
- List of scientific journals
