= Tarasht =

Neighborhood in Tehran, Iran

Coordinates: 33°58′N 57°13′E

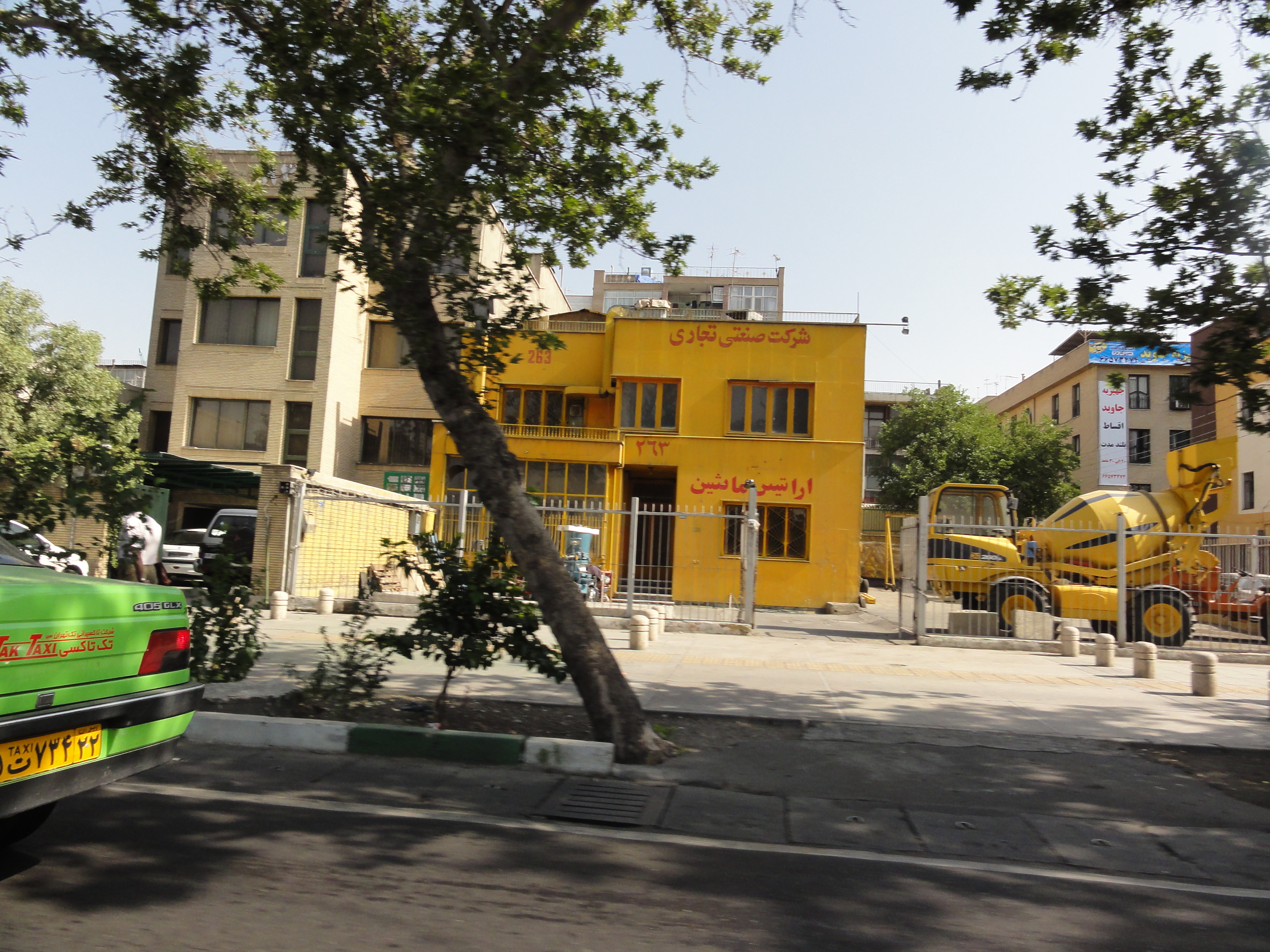
Tarasht, Tehran, Iran

Tarasht (Persian: طرشت) is a very old neighborhood in west Tehran metropolis.

The neighborhood is bordered by Azadi Ave. In the south, Jenah Exp. In the west, Aryashahr neighborhood in the north, and Towhid neighborhood in the east. Sharif University of Technology, one of the leading universities in Iran is situated in this neighborhood. Azadi Square is located at the south-west edge of Tarasht.
