= Lalehzar Zoo =

Historical zoo in Iran

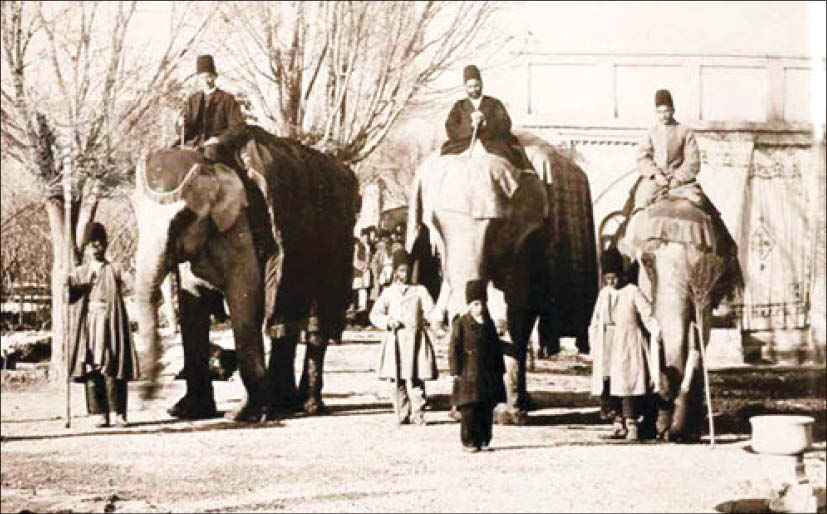
Lalehzar zoo in Tehran, circa 1850 CE

Lalehzar Zoo (Persian: باغ وحش لاله‌زار), was the first modern zoo of Iran situated in Tehran, which was established at the time of Fath-Ali Shah Qajar, and was expanded to a full functioning zoo by Naser al-Din Shah around 1850 CE.

The main reason for creating the zoo, in the beginning, was to keep animals for research and education in natural sciences.

== Background ==
Since antiquity, keeping animals for the court of Shahs in Iran had been in practice, and special locations were being considered for this purpose, which reminds us of the concept of a zoological garden. The reliefs from the Achaemenid and Sassanid eras up to even the Safavids, show that the Shahs were keeping animals in their courts, to display them in special ceremonies and feasts. Sassanids had a special place for keeping animals like elephants.

But the first known zoo of Iran, was established in Isfahan at the time of Safavids. The German explorer Adam Olearius in the year 1637 CE mentions it. Display of animals in public was common in all eras in Iran. For instance, James Justinian Morier, an English diplomat who had been invited to the court of Fath-Ali Shah Qajar on February 17, 1809, writes that while he was on his way to the palace, on the two sides of the Arg square, one lion and one bear were chained, and people were watching them.

== History ==
Lalehzar's garden was already functioning like a small zoo by the time of Fath-Ali Shah Qajar. There were 3 elephants, one rhino, and a peacock being kept in there.

Naser al-Din Shah had a particular interest in lions, such that in some cases he was asking to be informed about their conditions through Chapar or Telegraph. It is said that one other reason that Nasar al-Din Shah, created the zoo as his personal interest to the animals, which gradually moved him towards establishing one in Tehran. So, by around 1850 CE, the Lalehzar zoo was established.

Dolat-e Eliye-ye Iran newspaper in those years writes about the death of one of the zookeepers in the zoo. It writes "Outside the Dolat gate, there is a garden known as Lalehzar. In the begin they created a great cage inside that garden, and they left all types of birds there. The garden had been open to the public for exploring and watching... There was another cage there for predators. The animals kept in these cages are free and can move freely. Last year by a mistake of a keeper named Hasan, a tiger came outside when he opened the cage to give them food, and attacked Hasan. Others came to help and freed him, but due to the injuries he died after 20 days."

Later on as the city growth and as the Royal Palace of Doshan was completed, this zoo along with all its animals were transferred to Doshan Tappe. In Doshan-Tappe Zoo there were 4 male and female Persian lions from Shiraz mountains, three Caspian tigers from Mazandaran, one Persian cheetah, three Persian leopards from Jajrud, five bears from Damavand, hyena, antelope, monkey, donkey and peacock among the animals which were kept in this zoo, and probably were being transferred there from Lalehzar zoo.
