= Reza Roosta Azad =

Iranian academic (1962–2022)

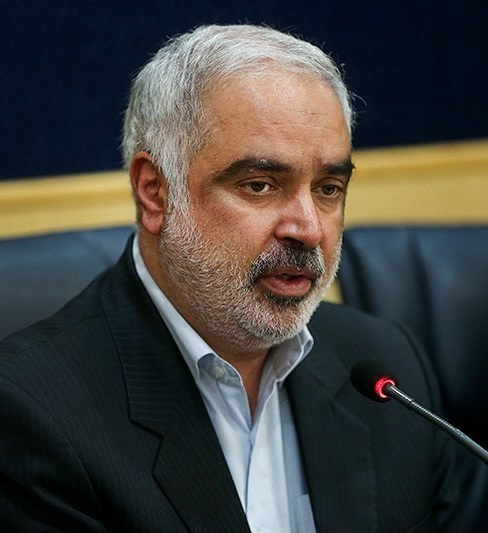
- Azad in 2014
- Born: 23 February 1962; Tehran, Iran
- Died: 11 October 2022 (aged 60)
- Education: Isfahan University; Istanbul Technical University; University of Waterloo
- Occupations: Professor, academic
- Known for: Chancellor of the Sharif University of Technology (2010–2014)
- Political party: Society of Devotees of the Islamic Revolution

Reza Roosta Azad (23 February 1962 – 11 October 2022) was an Iranian academic who was the chancellor of Sharif University of Technology, serving from 2010 until 2014.

Roosta Azad held a BSc from Isfahan University of Technology, a MSc from Istanbul Technical University and a PhD from the University of Waterloo.

Azad ranked 27th in the university entrance examination in 1980 and graduated ranking first in all three levels of undergraduate, master, and Ph.D. His scientific activities include 39 research projects, 43 articles published in prestigious national and international journals, 68 papers in national and international conferences, and supervising more than 80 masters and doctoral theses.

Academic offices
Preceded by Saeed Sohrabpour	Chancellor of Sharif University of Technology; 23 August 2010 – 28 August 2014	Succeeded by Mahmoud Fotouhi Firouzabad
