= Mahmud Fotuhi Firuzabad =

Iranian academic (born 1959)

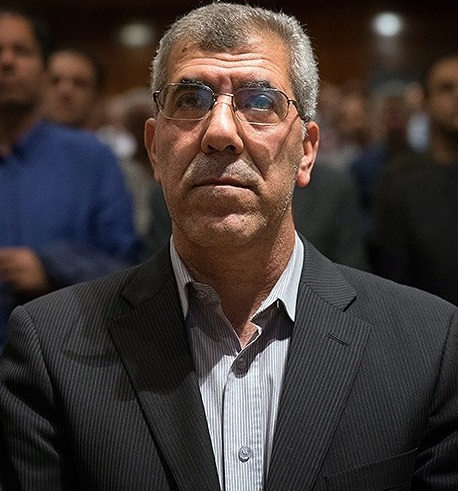
- Fotuhi in 2014
- Born: Mahmud Fotuhi Firuzabad; 1959 (age 66–67); Firuzabad, Yazd, Iran
- Education: Sharif University of Technology; University of Tehran; University of Saskatchewan
- Occupations: Professor, Academic
- Known for: President of the Sharif University of Technology (2014–2021)
- Website: ee.sharif.edu/~fotuhi/

Mahmoud Fotouhi Firouzabad (born 1959) is the former president of Sharif University of Technology, serving from 28 August 2014 to 18 October 2021.

He was awarded a scholarship from Iranian Ministry of Science to pursue his studies in University of Saskatchewan in Canada, where he completed MSc and PhD degrees from the University of Saskatchewan.

His scientific activities include more than 150 journals and papers, and supervising more than 50 masters and doctoral theses. He has become the IEEE Fellow since 2014.

== See also ==
- Hassan Bevrani

Academic offices
Preceded by Reza Roosta Azad	President of Sharif University of Technology; 28 August 2014 – 18 October 2021	Succeeded by Rasoul Jalili
