= Ali Mohammad Ranjbar =

Indian academic

Ali Mohammad Ranjbar (Persian: علی محمد رنجبر, 1943 – July 3, 2021) was an Iranian professor of electrical engineering and former chancellor of Sharif University of Technology.

Ranjbar received the MSc and PhD degrees in Electrical Engineering from University of Tehran in 1967 and Imperial College London in 1975, respectively with a thesis titled "Computer protection of high voltage transmission lines.". Since then, he was at Sharif University of Technology Department of Electrical Engineering, where he was a full professor. Ranjbar was the Editor-in-Chief of the Journal of Electrical Science and Technology since 1989 and the Director of Niroo Research Institute since 1996 too. His main research interests were in the areas of electric power systems protection and operation, Electrical Machines and Smart Grids.Wiley Interscience

Academic offices
Preceded by Hossein Ali Anvari	Chancellor of Sharif University of Technology; 1979-1980	Succeeded by Abbas Anvari
