= Hossein Ali Anvari =

Hossein Ali Anvari was an Iranian professor in electrical Engineering. He got his PhD in Electrical Engineering from Institut National des Sciences Appliquées de Toulouse. He served as the chancellor of Sharif University of Technology for a period of one year.

== Education ==
Hossein Ali Anvari was graduated from Alborz High School and later from College of Engineering in University of Tehran. He obtained his PhD in 1962 in Electrical Engineering from Institut National des Sciences Appliquées de Toulouse.

Academic offices
Preceded by Alireza Mehran	Chancellor of Sharif University of Technology; 1978-1979	Succeeded by Ali Mohammad Ranjbar
