= John F. Elliott =

American metallurgist

John Frank Elliott
- Born: July 31, 1920; Saint Paul, Minnesota
- Died: April 15, 1991 (aged 70); Winchester, Massachusetts
- Education: University of Minnesota; Massachusetts Institute of Technology
- Scientific career
- Fields: Metallurgy
- Workplaces: Massachusetts Institute of Technology

John Frank Elliott (July 31, 1920 – April 15, 1991) was an American professor of metallurgy who made significant contributions to the science of pyrometallurgy during his long career at Massachusetts Institute of Technology (MIT).

== Early life and education ==
Elliott was born July 31, 1920, in Saint Paul, Minnesota, and studied metallurgical engineering at the University of Minnesota where he graduated with distinction in 1942. After serving as a Lieutenant commander in the US Navy during World War II, he completed his Doctorate of Science at MIT in 1949.

== Career ==
Elliott joined the research laboratories of U.S. Steel before leaving for the Inland Steel Company where he was active in research relating to quality control. This was a time of growth for the US steel industry and there was significant funding for research into improving the steelmaking process and tightening the chemistry of new steel grades being developed. Elliott and his co-workers focused on developing understanding of the chemical thermodynamics the steelmaking process, an emphasis that he continued when returning to MIT in 1955 as an associate professor of metallurgy. He became a full professor in 1960 and over the next three decades published over 200 papers on steelmaking, high temperature chemistry, hot corrosion of materials and principles of chemical thermodynamics and kinetics. His two volume "Thermochemistry of Steelmaking" became a major source of basic data for the steel industry. Elliot's work with Sigworth on the solution behaviour of minor element in iron established an effective and relatively simple technique for predicting the outcome of steelmaking reactions. Elliott became director of the Mining and Minerals Resources Research Institute (MMRRI) at MIT which was created by the United States Bureau of Mines in 1978. The Association for Iron and Steel Technology (AIST) have an annual lectureship award named after him that honors his contribution to the field. MIT also has a Professorship of Materials Chemistry named after him, which in 2013 was filled by Donald Sadoway.

== Death ==
Elliott died of a brain tumor on April 15, 1991, in Winchester, Massachusetts, at the age of 70.
