= Mohammad Etemadi =

Iranian academic

Mohammad Etemadi (Persian: محمد اعتمادی) is an Iranian professor in electrical engineering and a professor at Sharif University of Technology since 1986. He attended Shiraz University, where he received a BS degree. He got his PhD in electrical engineering from University of California, Los Angeles. He served as the chancellor of Sharif University of Technology for a period of two years 1993–1995.

Academic offices
Preceded by Ali Akbar Salehi	Chancellor of Sharif University of Technology; 1993-1995	Succeeded by Sayed Khatiboleslam Sadrnezhaad
