= Mehdi Zarghamee =

Dr. Mehdi Shaghaghi Zarghamee (Persian: مهدی شقاقی ضرغامی) is a former Chancellor of Arya Mehr University of Technology (currently Sharif University of Technology) in Iran, former professor at the Department of Mathematics and Computer Sciences, and founder of the Isfahan University of Technology. Dr. Zarghamee currently works as Senior Principal in the Division of Engineering Mechanics and Infrastructure of Simpson Gumpertz & Heger Inc. Most notably, was the principal investigator for the structural modeling of the 9/11 collapse of the World Trade Center Towers for the NIST.

Dr. Zarghamee earned his Ph.D. in Structural Engineering from the University of Illinois and his S.M. in Mathematics from the Massachusetts Institute of Technology.

Academic offices
| Preceded by Hossein Nasr | Chancellor of Sharif University of Technology; 1975-1977 | Succeeded by Alireza Mehran |
