= Sharif University of Technology =

Public university in Tehran, Iran

- دانشگاه صنعتی شریف; Dāneŝgāhe San'ati-e Sharif
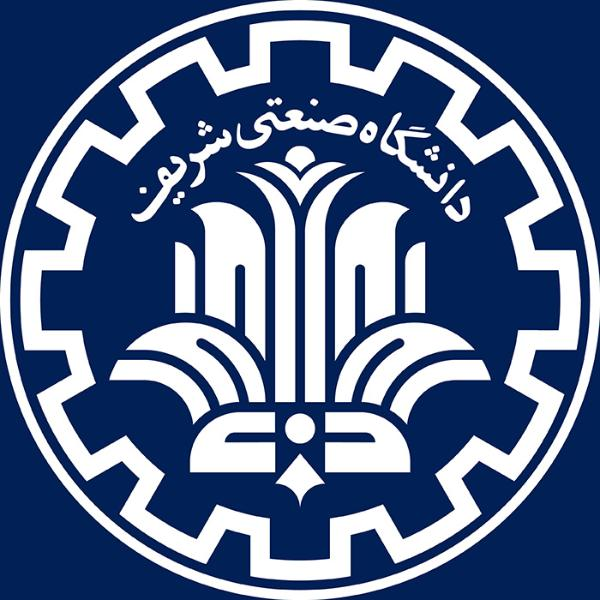
- Motto in English: The Place of Intellectuals and Elites; Transforming National Talents into Global Bests
- Type: Public Research University
- Established: 1966; 60 years ago
- Affiliations: MSRT; FUIW; IAU; ICTP; TWAS
- Endowment: US$ 0.5 billion (2021)
- President: Abbas Mousavi
- Academic staff: 460 (Full-time) (Fall 2022)
- Administrative staff: 395 (2021)
- Students: 10,812 (fall 2022)
- Undergraduates: 5,659 (2021)
- Postgraduates: 3,390 (2021)
- Doctoral students: 989 (2021)
- Location: Tehran, Tehran province, Iran; 35°42′6.47″N 51°21′5.18″E
- Campus: Urban, 74 acres (29.9 ha)
- Newspaper: Sharif Daily; Scientia Iranica
- Colors: Dark Blue Bright yellow light navy blue
- Sporting affiliations: 19 sports IUSF
- Website: sharif.ir

Sharif University of Technology (Persian: دانشگاه صنعتی شریف, romanized: Dāneshgāh-e San'ati-e Sharif) is a public research university in Tehran, Iran. The university is an institution for science, technology, engineering, and mathematics (STEM) fields.

Established in 1966 under the reign of Mohammad Reza Shah Pahlavi, it was named in his honor as Aryamehr University of Technology (Persian: دانشگاه صنعتی آریامهر, romanized: Dāneŝgāhe Sannatiye Āryāmehr) and for a short period after the 1979 revolution, the university was called Tehran University of Technology but then it was renamed to Sharif University of Technology after Majid Sharif Vaghefi, a leading dissident member of People's Mojahedin Organization of Iran.

Today, the university provides both undergraduate and graduate programs in 15 main departments. The student body consists of about 6,000 undergraduate students and 4,700 graduate students from all the 31 provinces of Iran. Funding for Sharif University is provided by the government and through private funding. Undergraduate admission to Sharif is limited to the top 800 of the 500,000 students who pass the national entrance examination administered annually by the Iranian Ministry of Science, Research and Technology.

== History ==
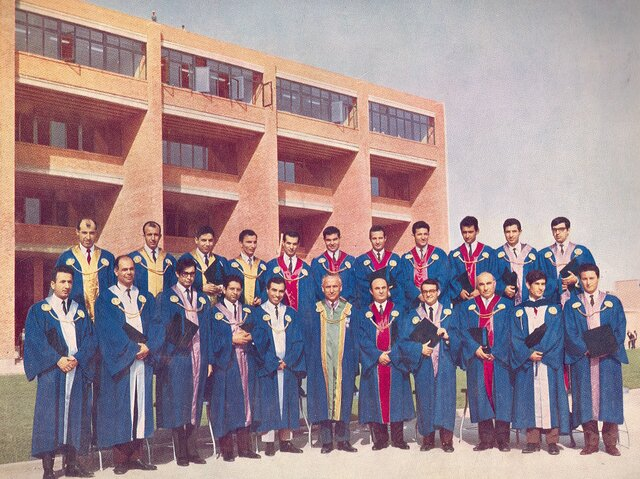
Mohammad Ali Mojtahedi and members of the scientific board of Aryamehr University of Technology in 1967.

The university was founded in 1966 with the name Aryamehr University of Industry by Mohammad Ali Mojtahedi. At that time, there were 54 faculty members and a total of 412 students who were selected by national examination. Four departments were established: Electrical, Metallurgical, Mechanical, and Chemical Engineering.

In 1972, Mohammad Reza Pahlavi appointed Hossein Nasr as president of the university with the goal of modeling the school based on the Massachusetts Institute of Technology, but with roots in Iranian culture. In 1974 a new campus of the university was established in Isfahan. But later, that campus became an independent university, named Isfahan University of Technology (IUT).

Following the revolution, the university was named after Majid Sharif Vaghefi, who was one of the People's Mujahedin of Iran group's leaders who was killed by the members of a splinter group (later renamed to Peykar Organization) who had recently converted from Islam to Marxism and were adamant to forcefully change the Mujahedin's organization's ideology to Marxism.

As of 2020, the university has about 12,000 students and over 700 faculty members in 16 main departments.

During the Mahsa Amini protests in 2022, many students participated, with video footage of the protest and subsequent response by Iranian security forces published first to social media and then by major news organizations. Iranian state news agency IRNA reported that at least 37 students were arrested and most were released shortly afterwards.

On 6 April 2026, in the 2026 Iran war, the campus was attacked by the US and Israel.

== Campuses ==
=== Main campus ===
The main campus of the university is located in the Tarasht neighborhood, near Azadi Square, Tehran, Iran. It is located close to the Azadi Tower, which is the symbol of Tehran and one of the main transportation hubs. The endowment of Sharif University has been estimated at $25 million.

=== International campus ===
Sharif University of Technology International Campus SUTIC
- دانشگاه صنعتی شریف پردیس بین الملل; Dāneshgāh-e San'ati-ye Sharif
- Type: Public
- Established: 2005
- Affiliations: Sharif University of Technology
- Chancellor: Reza Yousefi
- Students: ~1,000
- Location: (Iran) Kish Island, Hormozgan, Iran; 26°32′44.65″N 54°00′43.63″E
- Campus: Urban, 1.12 ha
- Language: English language
- Colours: Light Blue
- Website: www.kish.sharif.edu

Sharif University also has an International Campus on Kish Island in the Persian Gulf. The International Campus of Sharif University of Technology was established in 2005. Today there are two faculties active in this campus: Faculty of Engineering and Science, and Faculty of Management. The campus is currently admitting students for bachelor's, master's, and Ph.D. degrees in engineering courses and a master's degree in management.

== Admissions and selectivity ==
Undergraduate admission to Sharif University of Technology is conducted primarily through Iran's highly competitive national university entrance examination, known as the Konkur. Admission is generally limited to students achieving the highest national ranks among hundreds of thousands of applicants annually. Only students within the top percentile of the examination are typically admitted to Sharif's most competitive engineering and computer science programs.

== World rankings ==
University rankings
- Sharif University of Technology

Global – Overall
- ARWU World: 501–600 (2021)
- CWTS World: 371 (2021)
- QS World: =375 (2026)
- THE World: 401–500 (2022)
- USNWR Global: 598 (2023)

In the 2020 Academic Ranking of World Universities (also known as Shanghai Ranking), the university ranked between 501 and 600 in the world and first in Iran. According to the QS Ranking, Sharif University Technology has stood in the first place of Iran and maintained its international rank 334th. In the 2022-2023 U.S. News & World Report Best Global University Ranking, the university ranked 598th in the world.

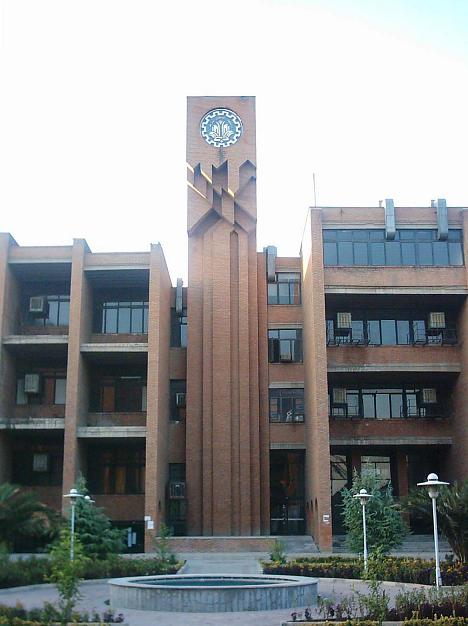
Avicenna Building, the main classroom building

== Student life ==
=== Political activities ===
Through the student political movement after the 2nd of Khordad Movement, Sharif students were also actively involved. The major groups with political intentions at Sharif, during 1997–2003, were Basij students and the Association of Muslim students, briefly called Anjoman (Association). Most other smaller groups were allies of either Basij or Anjoman. Basij was a serious opponent of Mohammad Khatami, the president at the time. Whereas Anjoman was a loyal follower. There have been several clashes between member students of the two groups. Free speech tribunes occasionally end in harsh, quarrel-like debates. However, the major clash between Anjoman and Basij occurred while the student movement was silent in most other universities. In 2006, a serious controversy resulting in physical tensions occurred after Basij attempted to bury the bodies of unknown martyrs of the Iran–Iraq War at the university's mosque court.

=== Sharif University of Technology Association (SUTA) ===
This non-profit organization is registered in the state of California, USA and has many chapters and affiliates around the world. Its mission is to enhance professional, academic, and social contacts among its membership, and to strengthen the ties between the association members living outside of Iran and the university.

== Faculty and alumni ==
=== Chancellors ===
- Mohammad Ali Mojtahedi, 1965–1967
- Fazlollah Reza, 1967–1968
- Mohammad Reza Amin, 1968–1972
- Seyyed Hossein Nasr, 1972–1975
- Mehdi Zarghamee, 1975–1977
- Alireza Mehran, 1977–1978
- Hossein Ali Anvari, 1978–1979
- Ali Mohammad Ranjbar, 1979–1980
- Abbas Anvari, 1980–1982
- Ali Akbar Salehi, 1982–1985
- Abbas Anvari, 1985–1989
- Ali Akbar Salehi, 1989–1993
- Mohammad Etemadi, 1993–1995
- Sayed Khatiboleslam Sadrnezhaad, 1995–1997
- Saeed Sohrabpour, 1997–2010
- Reza Roosta Azad, 2010–2014
- Mahmud Fotuhi Firuzabad, 2014–2021
- Rasool Jalili, 2021–2023
- Abbas Mousavi, 2023–present

=== Notable alumni ===
Alumni in academics include the late Maryam Mirzakhani, professor of mathematics at Stanford University and the first woman to be awarded a Fields Medal.

Imprisoned human rights blogger Kouhyar Goudarzi was an aerospace student at Sharif University until pressure from state security forces allegedly caused his dismissal. Omid Kokabee, an applied physics and mechanics alumnus, was arrested while visiting Iran during his postdoctoral research in University of Texas at Austin. He was sentenced to 10 years in prison for "communicating with a hostile government" and "illegitimate/illegal earnings." Mohammad-Ali Najafi ranked first in the Iranian national university entrance exam, and enrolled in Sharif University. He became a mathematician, reformist politician, and murderer, as he was the Mayor of Tehran for eight months, became a professor at the university, and then in May 2019 murdered one of his two wives..

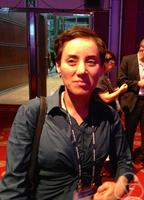
Maryam Mirzakhani: professor of mathematics at Stanford University and the first woman to be awarded a Fields Medal

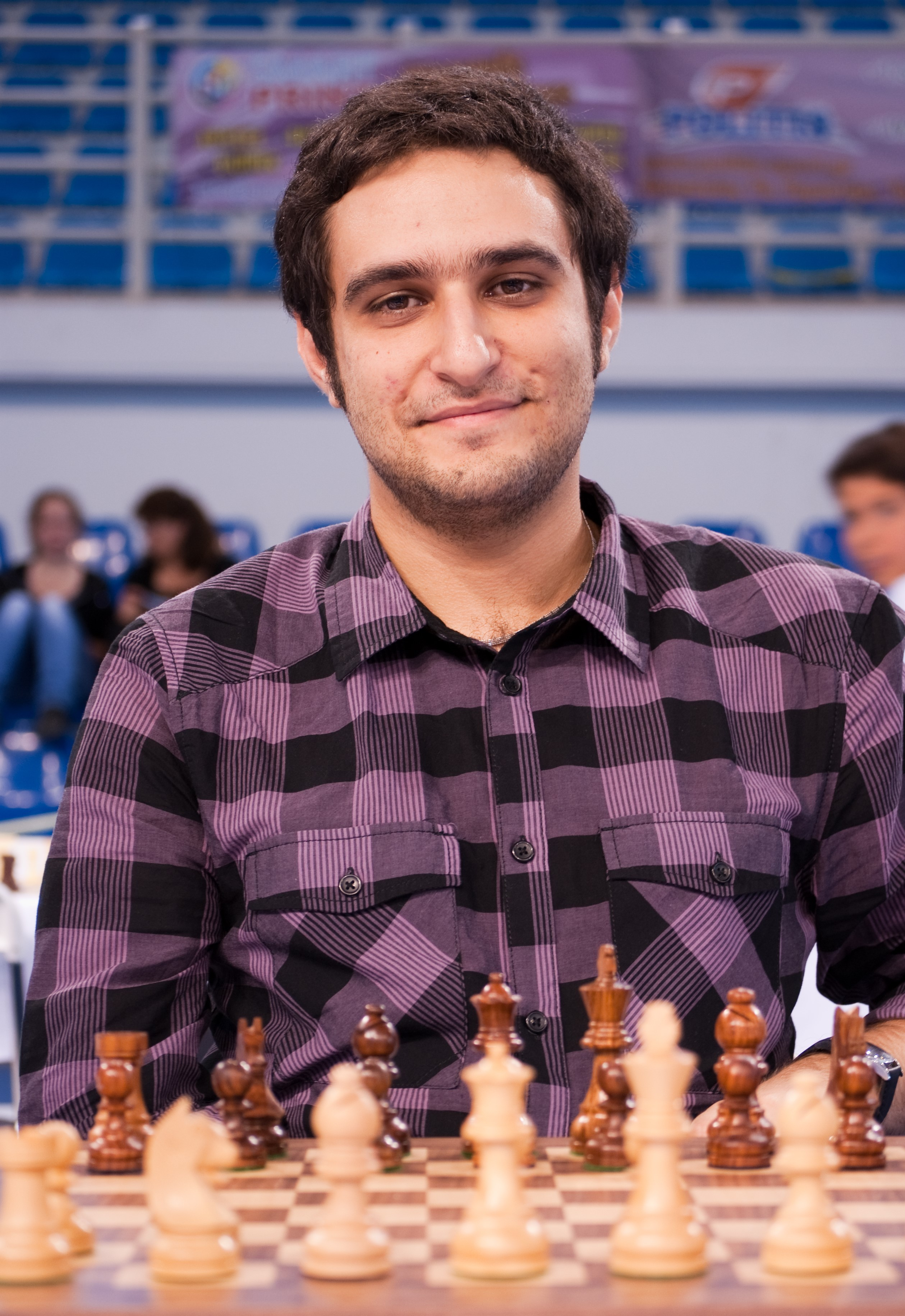
Elshan Moradi: chess grandmaster

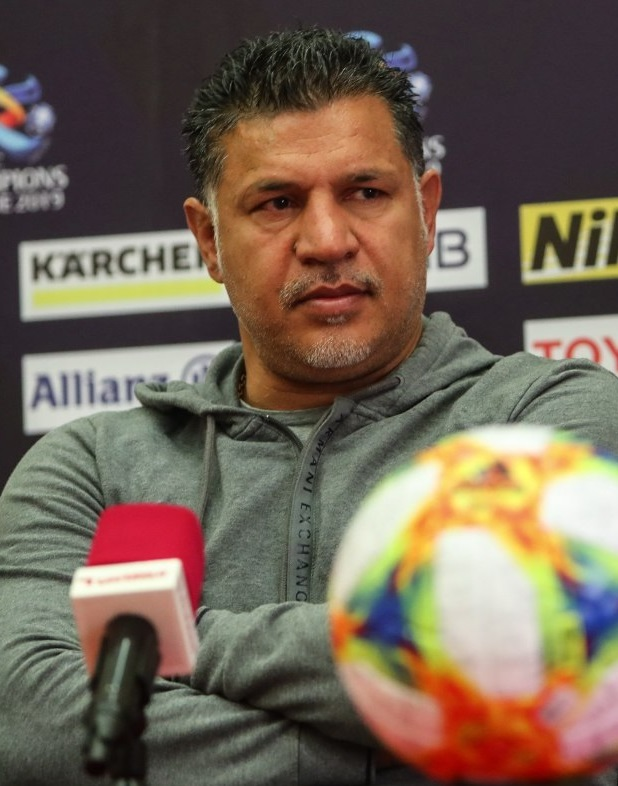
Ali Daei: former member and later head coach of Iranian national football team

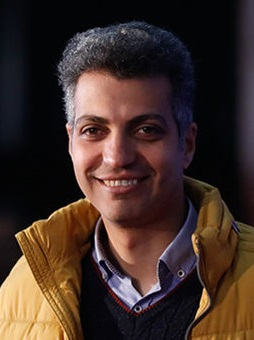
Adel Ferdosipour: football commentator

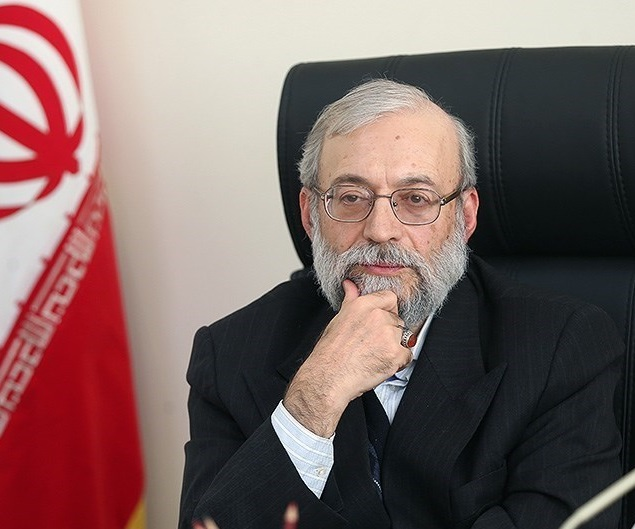
Mohammad-Javad Larijani: Iranian conservative politician, mathematical logician, and former diplomat

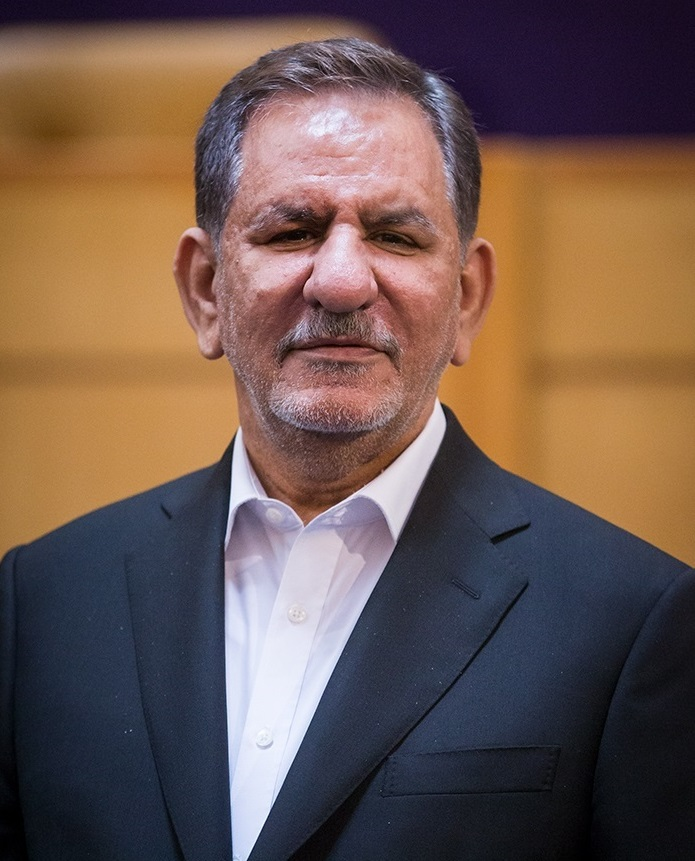
Eshaq Jahangiri: Vice president of Hassan Rouhani's government

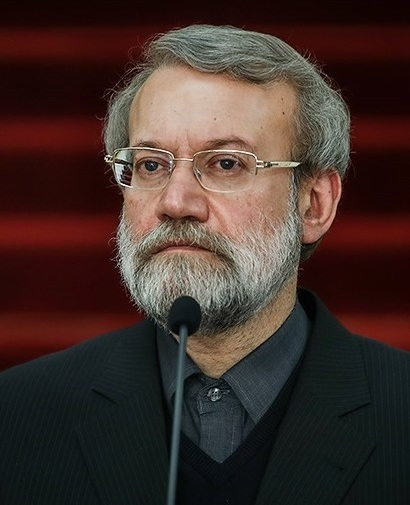
Ali Larijani: Iranian conservative politician, philosopher, former speaker of Iran's Parliament.

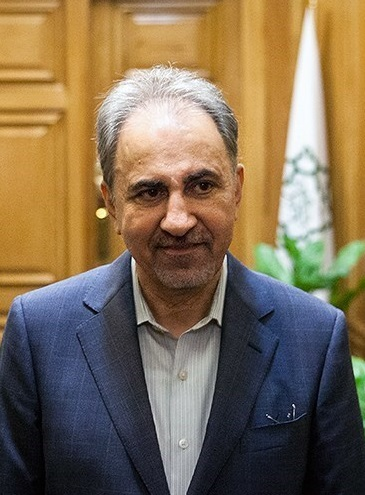
Mohammad-Ali Najafi, mathematician, professor, reformist politician, Mayor of Tehran, and murderer

== See also ==
- List of Islamic educational institutions
- Higher education in Iran
- Pardis Technology Park
- Shahbal, unmanned aerial vehicle (UAV) developed at SUT
- Iranian Machine Design Competition
