= List of Iranian news agencies =

This is a list of notable news agencies in Iran as well as other Iranian Farsi-language news agencies worldwide:

Owner/Kind	Name	Link		Langs	Paywalled
	Tarfandestan	www.tarfandestan.com			
Islamic Development Organization	Tebyan	http://tebyan.net	2002		No
Donyaye Eqtesad	Financial Tribune	http://www.financialtribune.com/	2014	FAR/ENG	No
IRIB	Al Alam TV	https://fa.alalam.ir/	23 February 2003	AR/FAR	No
Balatarin LLC	Balatarin	http://balatarin.com	August 16, 2006	FAR	No
Epoch Times	The Persian Epoch Times	https://persianepochtimes.com/	May 20, 2000	FAR	No
State-affiliated	Asr-e Iran	https://asriran.com/	2006	FAR/ENG	No
Golrang Conglomerate, sports news site	Varzesh3	http://varzesh3.com	2009	FAR	No
State-affiliated	Nour News	http://nournews.ir	2019	FAR/ENG	No
Ahl Al-Bayt World Assembly	AhlulBayt News Agency (ABNA)	http://abna24.com/	1990	FAR/ENG	No
Islamic Azad University	Azad News Agency	http://ana.ir	2012	FAR	No
Ministry of Sport and Youth (Iran)	Borna News Agency	http://borna.news	2007	FAR	No
IRGC Islamic Revolutionary Guard Corps	Fars News Agency	http://farsnews.ir/	2003	FAR/ENG	No
Office of the President of the Islamic Republic of Iran, Ali Ahmadniashalmani	Eslahatnews	http://eslahatnews.com	January 1, 2014	FAR	No
Iranian reformists, Elias Hazrati	Etemad	www.etemadnewspaper.ir	2002	FAR	No
Reformists, Mehdi Rahmanian	Shargh	http://sharghdaily.com	24 August 2003	FAR	No
Reformists, Mohammad-Hossein Khoshvaght	Fararu	http://fararu.com		FAR	No
Reformists, Mostafa Faghihi	Entekhab	https://entekhab.ir/	1991	FAR	No
Ministry of Agriculture Jihad	Iranian Agriculture News Agency (IANA)	http://iana.ir	May 2004	FAR	No
State-affiliated	Iran Book News Agency (IBNA)	http://ibna.ir	2006	FAR	No
Amirreza Khademazqadi	Iran Pro Sport News Agency	http://ipna.ir		FAR	No
Ministry of Cultural Heritage, Tourism and Handicrafts	Iranian Cultural Heritage News Agency Miras Aria	http://chtn.ir/		FAR	No
State-affiliated	Iran's Metropolises News Agency (IMNA)	http://imna.ir		FAR/ENG	No
State-affiliated	Iranian Labour News Agency (ILNA)	http://ilna.ir	February 24, 2003	FAR/ENG	No
State-affiliated	Iranian Students' News Agency (ISNA)	http://isna.ir	November 1999	FAR/ENG	No
State-affiliated	Islamic Republic News Agency (IRNA)	http://irna.ir	1981	FAR/ENG	No
IRIB	Islamic Republic of Iran Broadcasting (IRIB)	http://irib-news.ir	1979	FAR	No
Islamic Consultative Assembly	Islamic Consultative Assembly News Agency (ICANA)	http://icana.ir/	2009	FAR	No
Office of the President of Iran, Alireza Moaezi	KhabarOnline News Agency (KhabarOnline)	http://khabaronline.ir	2008	FAR	No
Omid Molaei, Khabar Fori holding	Khabar Foori	http://khabarfoori.com		FAR	No
Islamic Development Organization	Tehran Times	http://tehrantimes.com/	May 21, 1979	FAR/ENG	No
IRISL Group	Maritime News Agency of Iran (MANA)	http://manadarya.ir	July 11, 2004	FAR	No
Islamic Development Organization	Mehr News Agency (MNA)	http://mehrnews.com/	22 June 2003	FAR/ENG	No
Judicial system of the Islamic Republic of Iran	Mizan News Agency	http://mizanonline.ir	2014	FAR	No
IRIB	Press TV	http://www.presstv.ir/	8 July 2007	FAR/ENG	No
State-affiliated	Pupils Association News Agency (PANA)	https://pana.ir/		FAR	No
IRGC	Student News Network (SNN)	https://snn.ir/	2003	FAR	No
IRIB	Young Journalist Club	http://yjc.ir	1999	FAR	No
IRGC	Tabnak	http://tabnak.ir	2007	FAR	No
IRGC	Mashreq News	https://mashreghnews.ir/		FAR	No
IRGC	Tasnim News Agency	http://tasnimnews.ir	November 11, 2012	FAR/ENG/RUS/HEBREW	No
State-affiliated	Kayhan	http://kayhan.ir/	May 1980	FAR	No
State-affiliated	International Quran News Agency (IQNA)	http://iqna.ir		FAR/ENG	No
IRGC news bulletin	Sepah news	http://sepahnews.ir/		FAR	No
Qalam Ayandeh company	Zoomit	http://zoomit.ir		FAR	No
Reformists	Ettelaat	www.ettelaat.com	10 July 1926	FAR	No
Payamema	Payamema	http://payamema.ir/		FAR	No
State-affiliated	Official Newspaper of Islamic Republic of Iran	http://rrk.ir	1979	FAR	Yes
IRGC	Javan (newspaper)	http://www.javanonline.ir/	1998	FAR	No
State-affiliated	Islamic Republic (newspaper)	http://www.jepress.ir/	30 May 1979	FAR	No
State-affiliated	Khorasan (newspaper)	http://khorasanonline.ir/	1949	FAR	No
State-affiliated	Iran Daily Newspaper	http://irandaily.ir	1995	FAR	No
State-affiliated	Hamshahri	http://www.hamshahrionline.ir/	15 December 1992	FAR	No
State-affiliated	Shana	http://www.shana.ir		FAR	No
State-affiliated	Farheekhtegan	http://farhikhteganonline.ir/	20 May 2009	FAR	No
State-affiliated	Vatan-e-Emrooz	http://www.vatanemrooz.ir		FAR	No
Saqi Baqerinia	Asia (economic newspaper)	http://asianews.ir/	June 15, 2001	FAR	No
State-affiliated	Aftab news	http://aftabnews.ir/		FAR	No
State-affiliated	Baztab	http://baztab.ir/	January 2007	FAR	No
State-affiliated	Rajanews	http://www.rajanews.com/		FAR	No
State-affiliated	Didban Iran	http://www.didbaniran.ir/	2015	FAR	No
State-affiliated	Rouydad24	http://www.rouydad24.ir/		FAR	No
State-affiliated	Namehnews	http://www.namehnews.com/		FAR	No
Sports	Footballi	http://footballi.net/		FAR	No
State-affiliated	Baharnews	http://www.baharnews.ir/		FAR	No
Hormuz Porrostami	Shabakeh	http://www.shabakeh-mag.com/		FAR	No
Entertainment news	Donya-ye Bazi	http://www.dbazi.com		FAR	No
Entertainment news	Donyaye Tasvir	http://www.dtonline.ir/		FAR	No
Entertainment news	Film	http://www.film-magazine.com/		FAR	No
News aggregrator	Shahre Khabar	http://www.shahrekhabar.com/		FAR	No
Farsi-language news sites not hosted inside the country					
Amwaj	Amwaj	http://amwaj.media/fa		FAR	Yes
Radio Israel	Radio Isreal	http://radis.org/	December 1947	FAR	No
Le Monde	Le Monde diplomatique	http://ir.mondediplo.com/	1954	FAR	No
Persian Mirror	Persian Mirror	http://www.persianmirror.ca/		FAR	No
Tavaana	Tavaana	http://tavaana.org/	2010	FAR	No
News directory	Gooya	http://gooya.com	1998	FAR	No
Journal Hafteh	Hafteh	http://hafteh.ca/		FAR	No
Nazenin Ansari	Kayhan London	http://kayhan.london	27 May 1942	FAR	No
BBC	BBC Persian	http://bbcpersian.com	29 December 1940	FAR	No
Volant Media UK Ltd	Iran International	http://iranintl.com	19 May 2017	FAR/ENG	No
Maziar Bahari	Iran Wire	http://iranwire.com		FAR	No
Turkish Radio and Television Corporation	TRT Farsi	http://trtfarsi.com	31 January 1968	TURK/FAR	No
People's Republic of China China Global Television Network	CGTN Farsi	http://persian.cgtn.com	31 December 2016	CHINESE/FAR	No
MBC Group	Al Arabiya Farsi	http://farsi.alarabiya.net/	3 March 2003	AR/FAR	No
Rossiya Segodnya	Sputnik Iran	http://spnfa.ir/	29 October 1929	RUS/FAR	No
RFI	RFI Farsi Radio France Internationale	http://rfi.fr	1975	FR/FAR	No
Euronews	Euronews Persian	http://euronews.com	1 January 1993	FAR/ENG	No
DW	DW Deutsche Welle Farsi	http://dw.com	3 May 1953	DU/FAR	No
Al Jazeera	Al Jazeera Farsi	http://www.aljazeera.com/where/iran/	1 November 1996	AR/FAR	No
Kurdistan24	Kurdistan24 Farsi	http://www.kurdistan24.net/fa	31 October 2015	KURD/FAR	No
IRGC /Hezbollah	Al Mayadeen	https://english.almayadeen.net/	11 June 2012	AR/ENG/ES	No
Defunct					
Marjan Television Network	Manoto	http://manoto.news	28 October 2010	FAR	No
USAID	Radio Farda Radio Free Europe/Radio Liberty RFERL	http://radiofarda.com	December 2002	FAR	No
USAID	VOA Farsi	http://ir.voanews.com	February 1, 1942	FAR	No
Ruhollah Zam	Amadnews	http://amadnews.co	2015	FAR	No
Aliasghar Honarmand	Narenji	http://narenji.ir/		FAR	No

== See also ==
- Mass media in Iran
- International Rankings of Iran in Communication
- List of newspapers in Iran
