= Mohammad Mahdi Faghihi =

- محمدمهدی فقیهی
- Occupations: Newspaper publisher, religious scholar
- Known for: Founding and editing Entekhab

Mohammad Mahdi Faghihi (Persian: محمدمهدی فقیهی) is a religious scholar, newspaper editor and political figure from Iran. He is well-known as the founder of the Iranian newspaper Entekhab and religious and philosophical quarterly Naghd va Nazar.

== Career ==
=== Religious and academic activities ===
Faghihi was one of the members of the Islamic Propagation Organization of the Qom Seminary. He was holding high-ranking posts in both administration and research in the seminary. He was also active in publishing scholarly and philosophical material. Faghihi established the Qom based quarterly, Naghd va Nazar, that published articles on religion and philosophy and contemporary Islamic thoughts, including those of the religious intellectuals.

As it was stated in a 2009 article on Rooz Online website, Faghihi was connected to the rise of the religious reformist and intellectual discourses. He was active among other thinkers such as Malekian Mostafa, Seyyed Hossein Nasr, and Abdolkarim Soroush.

=== Entekhab newspaper ===
During the latter part of the 1990s, Faghihi became engaged in the founding of Entekhab, a newspaper in Tehran. Between 1999 and 2004, the newspaper appeared in print form with Faghihi in charge. The editor-in-chief was Seyed Taha Hashemi. Faghihi was also connected with the Islamic Propagation Office of the Qom Seminary, the owner of the newspaper.

Among the political events covered by the newspaper is the student unrest that took place in July 1999. It is said that the editorial policy of the newspaper combined political conservatism with progressive ideologies. The publication ceased in 2004 because of differences regarding its funding issues and editorial stance.

=== Political activities ===
Faghihi has been politically active as well. For example, in 2004, he became the head of the election campaign of the politician Ali Larijani, but soon he abandoned this role, according to the biographical information published in the Rooz Online.

In October 2003, Faghihi was brought to the Tehran Revolutionary Court together with Mohsen Mandegari, the political editor of Entekhab. As per Reporters Without Borders, Faghihi and Mandegari were arrested after an article was published about the significance of signing an agreement between Iran and the International Atomic Energy Agency. Faghihi stayed several hours before being released.

=== Later activities ===
After the cessation of the print edition in 2004, Faghihi and Taha Hashemi were behind the creation of the Entekhab News Agency in its online format. The online publication later came under the control of Faghihi’s son, Mostafa Faghihi.
