= 1901 in Iran =

- Decades
- See also: Other events of 1901; Years in Iran

The following lists events that happened during 1901 in Qajar era.

== Incumbents ==
- Monarch: Mozaffar ad-Din Shah Qajar

== Births ==
- April 3 – Khalil Esfandiary-Bakhtiary, Persian ambassador.
- April 14 – Mohammad Hejazi (author), Iranian writer.
- October 15 – Aligholi Ardalan, Iranian politician.
- ? – Adib Khansari, Iranian musician.
- ? – Ako Kurdnasab, Kurdish journalist.
- ? – Ali Mohammad Yari, Paralympic athlete of Iran.
- ? – Ali Naderi, Iranian Paralympic athlete.
- ? – Ali Razmara, Iranian politician.
- ? – Alireza Kamali (athlete), Iranian Paralympic athlete.
- ? – Asghar Massombagi, Iranian film director.
- ? – Asghar Zareeinejad, Iranian Paralympian.
- ? – Avaz Azmoudeh, Iranian Paralympic athlete.
- ? – Azadeh Tabazadeh, Geophysicist from Iran.
- ? – Azam Khodayari, Paralympic athlete of Iran.
- ? – Ebrahim Ranjbar, Iranian Paralympic archer.
- ? – Faiz Mohammad Baloch, Balochi composer and performer.
- ? – Kamran Shokrisalari, Iranian Paralympic athlete.
- ? – Khalil Maleki, Iranian politician.
- ? – Mahdi Elahi Ghomshei, Iranian poet, philosopher and translator.
- ? – Mani Nouri, Iranian actor.
- ? – Marzieh Arfa, Turkish-born Iranian, first woman to be promoted to brigadier general.
- ? – Mehdi Azar, Iranian politician and physician.
- ? – Mehrdad Karamzadeh, Paralympic athletes of Iran.
- ? – Mehrdad New York, Iranian-American singer.
- ? – Mohammad Sadeghi Mehryar, Iranian Paralympic athlete.
- ? – Mohammad-Hossein Khoshvaght, Iranian politician.
- ? – Mohsen Amoo-Aghaei, Iranian Paralympian.
- ? – Nazenin Ansari, Iranian journalist.
- ? – Reza Roosta, Iranian politician.
- ? – Shahnaz Azad, Iranian journalist.
- ? – Siamak Saleh-Farajzadeh, Iranian Paralympian.
- ? – Vahab Saalabi, Iranian Paralympic athlete.

== Deaths ==
- May 11 – Muhammad Baqir Sharif Tabatabae, Iranian Islamic scholar.
- ? – Muhammad Hasan Ashtiyani.
