= Comics and Conflict =

2014 book by Cord A. Scott

Comics and Conflict: Patriotism and Propaganda from WWII through Operation Iraqi Freedom
- Author: Cord A. Scott
- Language: English
- Publisher: Naval Institute Press
- Publication date: 2014
- Publication place: United States
- Media type: Print
- Pages: 198
- ISBN: 9781612514772
- OCLC: 859385275

Comics and Conflict: Patriotism and Propaganda from World War II through Operation Iraqi Freedom is a book created by American academic Cord A. Scott and published by the Naval Institute Press in 2014. Scott has stated that the book's basis lay in a 2011 dissertation he wrote for college, as well as his own early interest in comics. He also noted that the book and dissertation was also influenced by a comment made by a comic book store owner after the events of the September 11 attacks, when the owner noted that the character of Captain America was "being brought back to fight terrorism."

== Summary ==
In the book, Scott examines how illustrations and comics were used as a form of propaganda and a way to express patriotism. He highlights specific comic books such as Captain America as examples of this and how they have been used from the World War II era to modern day.

== Reception ==
Comics and Conflict has been reviewed by outlets such as History: Reviews of New Books, American Historical Review, and the Military Review. The Journal of American History noted that the work "almost exactly repeats" Scott's 2011 dissertation “Comics and Conflict: War and Patriotically Themed Comics in American Cultural History” and "includes the same seven chapters and each of their subsections, in the same order and using the same words." Reviewing for Media, War, & Conflict, Kees Ribbens wrote that "The historical overview presented by Scott illustrates how US war comics during and immediately after WWII were overwhelmingly patriotic with only a few publishers avoiding glorification of war or challenging government views."
