= Asia News =

Asia News may refer to:

- Asian News International (ANI), an Indian news agency with 50 bureaus in India
- Asia Business News (ABN), a former business news channel of Dow Jones and Company
- Asia News Network (ANN), an alliance of 23 news organization across Asia
- AsiaNews, an online newsmagazine affiliated with the Roman Catholic Church
- Indo-Asian News Service (IANS), the largest private news agency in India
- Asia (economic newspaper), a non-governmental Iranian economic news website and newspaper
