= Honarmand =

Honarmand is a surname. Notable people with the surname include:

- Aliasghar Honarmand, Iranian journalist
- Mohammad-Reza Honarmand (born 1955), Iranian film director, screenwriter and producer
