= Danube Private University =

University in Krems an der Donau, Austria

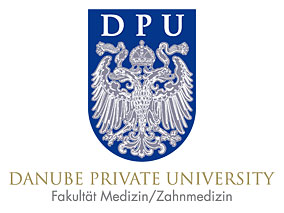
- Established: 13 August 2009
- President: Marga B. Wagner-Pischel
- Location: Krems an der Donau, Austria
- Website: dp-uni.ac.at/en

Danube Private University is a private university in Krems an der Donau, Austria. It was founded on 13 August 2009. The university provides education in dentistry, medicine, dental hygiene and medical journalism.

== History ==
This institution for higher education was accredited as a private university by the Austrian Accreditation Council on August 13, 2009. The university offers a growing number of undergraduate degrees, including Dentistry, Dental Hygiene, Medicine, and Medical Journalism & Public Relations. Postgraduate degrees include the Master of Science specialties in dentistry (MSc) and a scientific doctorate in dentistry (PhD).

In 2012, an outpatient dental clinic with around 50 treatment spots was opened on the campus site. In 2015, the first cohort graduated from the dental medicine program.

In 2017, a research center and an additional building were opened on the former site of the Förthof railway station. This new addition houses lecture halls, hands-on training facilities, an auditorium, and research labs. The total area of the DPU campus has now reached around 15,000 m².

The President of the DPU was awarded honorary citizenship of Krems in recognition of the extremely positive impact the university has had on the city. “With the Danube Private University (DPU), she has created a jewel in the city's crown,” said the mayor.

The Danube Private University will offer a new master's degree program in Medicine starting in the fall of 2024, following its successful accreditation by the Agency for Quality Assurance and Accreditation Austria (AQ Austria). This is an important development for Lower Austria as a leader in the field of healthcare.

== Research and Collaborations ==
The main areas of research are:

- Natural and Cultural History of Mankind - Univ.-Prof. Dr. Kurt W. Alt
- Neurodegenerative Diseases - Univ.-Prof. Dr. Ralf Braun
- MIAAI Medical Image Analysis & Artificial Intelligence - Univ.-Prof. DDr. Ramona Woitek
- Life Science Technologies - Univ.-Prof. DI Dr. Christoph Kleber
- Clinical Application of Artificial Intelligence in Dentistry - Univ.-Prof. Dr. Constantin von See MaHM and Univ.-Prof. Dr. Dritan Turhani
- Microplastics - Univ.-Prof. Dr. Maja Henjakovic

The university masterfully combines medicine, art, and culture. Its founder is a committed patron of the arts who formerly served as an art consultant for politics and business. In 2024, the DPU is publishing a book entitled *Heilkraft der Literatur* (German for “Healing Power of Literature”) with contributions from high-profile authors such as Rüdiger Safranski and Michael Hauskeller.

To promote student mobility, Danube Private University cooperates with ERASMUS+, the International Union of Schools of Oral Health (IUSOH), and others.

The university has research collaborations with numerous domestic and international institutions, such as the Austrian Institute of Technology (AIT), the CEST Competence Center, the IPNA at the University of Basel, the National Institute of Health and Medical Research Paris 5 (INSERM), Charité Berlin, the University of Brescia, and the University of Bari Aldo Moro in Italy, as well as the University of Cambridge in the UK.

In 2023, the DPU was represented in 16 publicly funded research projects or received approval for these projects. Funding bodies include the Austrian Research Promotion Agency (FFG), the FWF, the EU, and the GFF NÖ. These projects have led to numerous other collaborations with national and international partners, such as the Universidad de la República Montevideo (Uruguay), the Universidad Peruana de Ciencias Aplicadas (Peru), the Universidad Nacional de La Plata (Argentina), the RISE Research Institutes of Sweden, and others.

== Challenges ==
The Dental Association of Austria initially opposed the university due to quality concerns. One of the main worries of medical officials was that as many dentists would be trained as in the whole of Austria to date.

Possible inconsistencies in the accreditation process were the subject of a parliamentary inquiry in May 2010, but the Federal Ministry of Science and Research rejected the criticism of the Accreditation Council. However, in the reaccreditation procedure of the DPU in 2014, the experts appointed by the Agency for Quality Assurance and Accreditation Austria confirmed the extension of the accreditation.

The DPU had to retract its claim that the state of Lower Austria provides the internships at hospitals that are necessary for training. At the beginning of 2011, the State Parliament decided that the state was under no obligation to do so. The Provincial Government was commissioned to have the accreditation of the DPU reviewed; this was confirmed by the BMWFW in September 2015.

The master’s degree program in medicine at Danube Private University was withdrawn from admission in 2021 due to “significant deficiencies.” The DPU lodged an appeal, which is why it was allowed to continue accepting students for the master’s in medicine. The decision was ultimately up to the Federal Administrative Court. Finally, in 2024, accreditation was granted for a master’s degree in medicine in Wiener Neustadt (a new second DPU location starting in the fall of 2024). The program is supported by the Lower Austrian State Health Agency (LGA) in cooperation with the Hochegg, Neunkirchen, and Wiener Neustadt state hospitals.
