= 2009 Iranian presidential election =

- 12 June 2009
- Turnout: 85.22% (▲25.38pp)
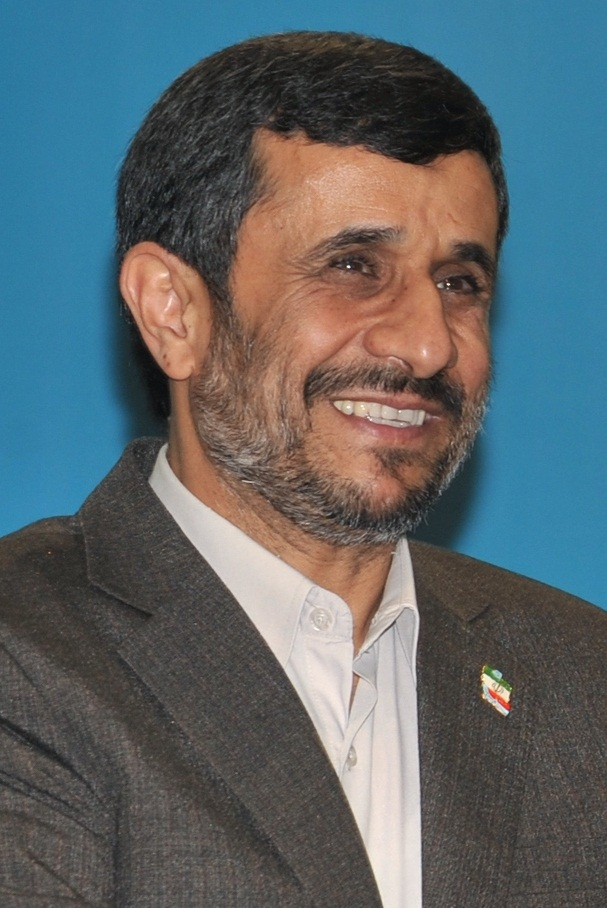

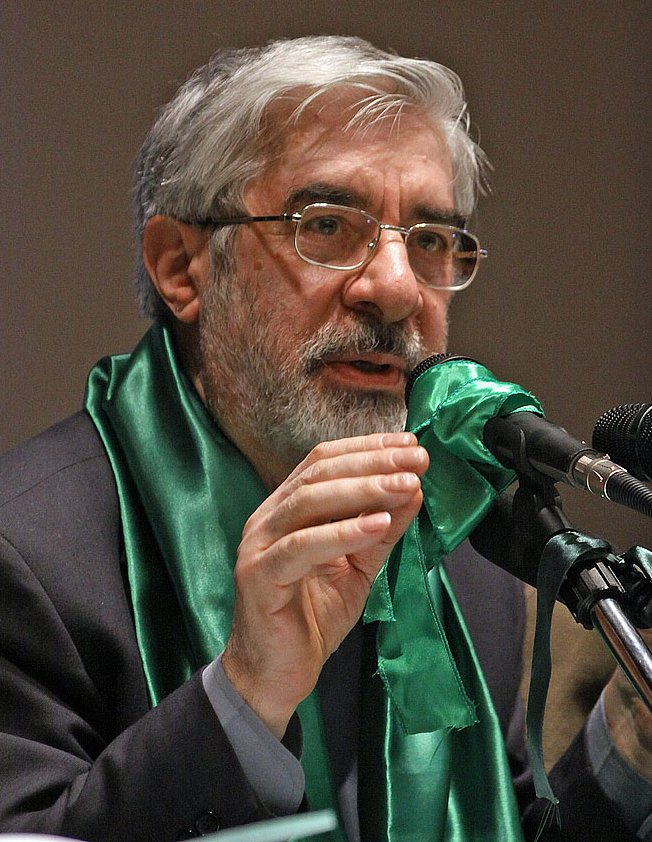
Nominee	Mahmoud Ahmadinejad	Mir-Hossein Mousavi
Party	ABII	CCRF
Alliance	Principlists	Reformists
Popular vote	24,592,793	13,338,121
Percentage	63.14%	34.24%
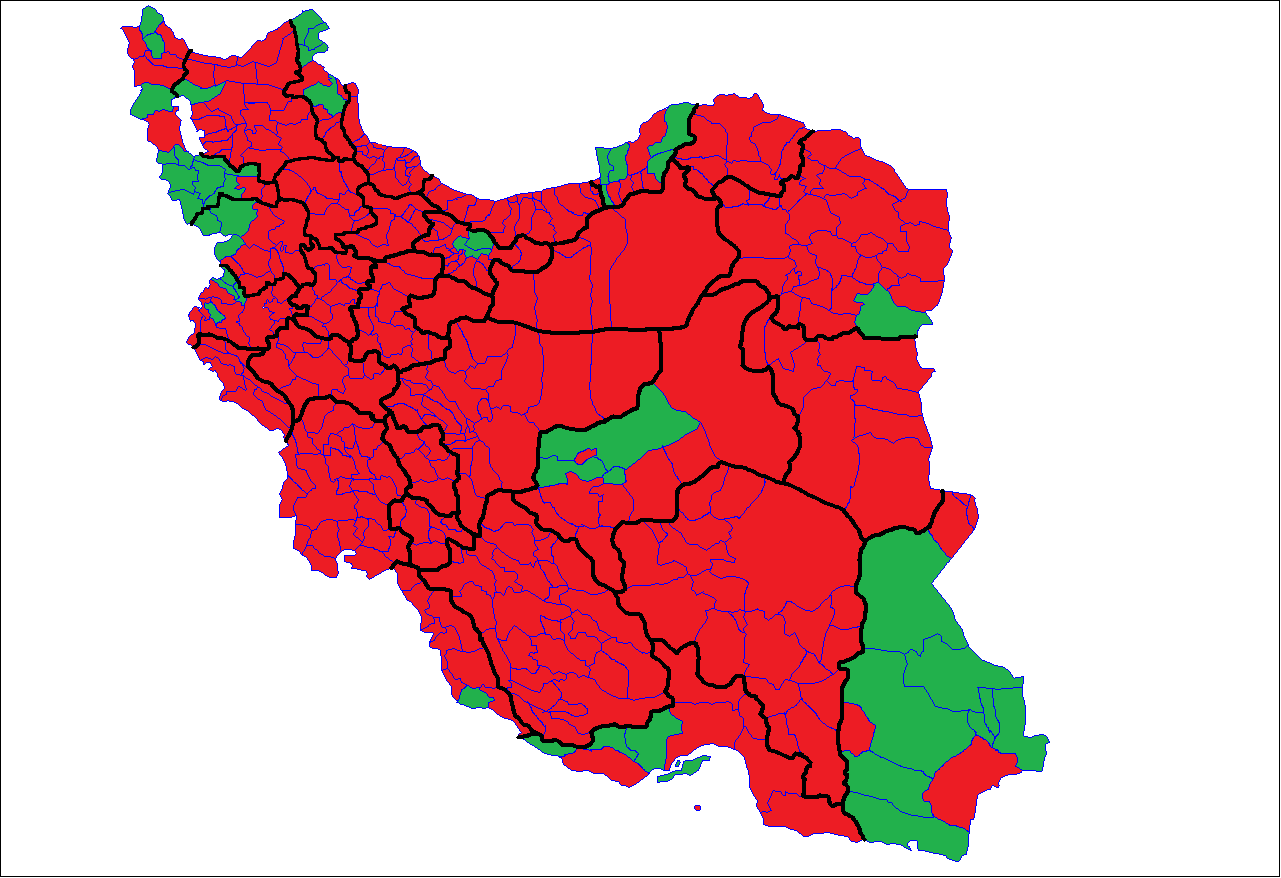
- Most voted-for candidate by district
President before election
Mahmoud Ahmadinejad
ABII
Elected President
Mahmoud Ahmadinejad
ABII

Presidential elections were held in Iran on 12 June 2009, with incumbent Mahmoud Ahmadinejad running against three challengers. The next morning the Islamic Republic News Agency, Iran's news agency, announced that with two-thirds of the votes counted, Ahmadinejad had won the election with 62% of the votes cast, and that Mir-Hossein Mousavi had received 34% of the votes cast. There were large irregularities in the results and people were surprised by them, which resulted in protests of millions of Iranians, across every Iranian city and around the world and the emergence of the opposition Iranian Green Movement.

Many Iranian figures directly supported the protests and declared the votes were fraudulent. Among them, many film directors like Jafar Panahi (who was consequently banned from making movies for 20 years and condemned to six years imprisonment), Mohammad Rasoulof (also condemned to 6 years imprisonment), actors and actresses like Pegah Ahangarani (who was consequently imprisoned), Ramin Parchami (who was consequently condemned to one year imprisonment), sportsmen like the whole Iran national football team who wore green wristbands in their game against South Korea to support the movement, scholars like Mostafa Tajzadeh, Mohsen Aminzadeh, Akbar Ganji, Mohsen Sazegara, many religious figures like Mohsen Kadivar, Grand Ayatollah Yousef Saanei, Grand Ayatollah Sayyid Ali Mohammad Dastgheib Shirazi, traditional singers like Mohammad Reza Shajarian, defected Basij and Iranian Revolutionary Guards like Amir Farshad Ebrahimi and those who confessed with covered faces.

The European Union and several western countries expressed concern over alleged irregularities during the vote, and many analysts and journalists from the United States and United Kingdom news media voiced doubts about the authenticity of the results.

Mousavi issued a statement accusing the Interior Ministry, which was responsible for conducting the election, of widespread election fraud and urged his supporters to engage in peaceful protests. He also lodged an official appeal with the Guardian Council for new and more transparent elections. Supreme Leader Ayatollah Ali Khamenei urged the nation to unite behind Ahmadinejad, labeling his victory as a "divine assessment". Khamenei then announced there would be an investigation into vote-rigging claims.

On 16 June, the Guardian Council announced it would recount 10% of the votes and concluded there were no irregularities at all, dismissing all election complaints. However, Mousavi stated that a recount would not be sufficient since he claimed 14 million unused ballots were missing, giving the Interior Ministry an opportunity to manipulate the results. On 19 June, Supreme Leader Ayatollah Ali Khamenei denounced the pro-Mousavi demonstrations as illegal, and protests the next day were met with stiff resistance from government forces, with many reported deaths.

The Green Movement of Iran continued its peaceful protests until 14 February 2011 and radicalized itself demanding a total regime change and departure of Khamenei from power.

== Background ==
Ahmadinejad became President of Iran after the 2005 election. The losing candidates at that time claimed irregularities at the polls, but the charges were not investigated. A formal protest to the Guardian Council was made and the group dismissed it without comment. His victory had surprised most observers of the campaign. At that time the reformist camp had mostly either boycotted elections entirely or held back out of disillusionment with past lack of progress. The voting for the 2009 election was scheduled for 12 June 2009 and ended up being extended until midnight that day because the turnout was unexpectedly high. Voting ended up proceeding four hours longer than originally scheduled.

The president is elected by direct vote; however, candidates for the presidency must be approved by the 12-member Council of Guardians. Candidates need to win a majority (more than half) to become president. Iran has a two-round system: if none of the candidates wins the majority in the first round, the top two candidates will go to a run-off. The first round was held on 12 June 2009; the run-off would have been held one week later, on 19 June 2009. All Iranian citizens of age 18 and up are eligible to vote. Both the Iranian Center for Statistics and the Iranian Ministry of the Interior stated that there were around 46.2 million eligible voters.

== Candidates ==
On 20 May 2009, the Guardian Council officially announced a list of approved candidates, while rejecting a number of registered nominees. Only four candidates were approved by the Guardian Council, out of the 476 men and women who had applied to seek the presidency of Iran in the 2009 election.

=== Approved candidates ===
Conservatives

- Mahmoud Ahmadinejad, incumbent
- Mohsen Rezaee, former Commander of the Iranian Revolutionary Guard and current secretary of the Expediency Council. Supported by the Islamic Society of Engineers

Reformists

- Mehdi Karroubi, former Speaker of the Majlis
- Mir-Hossein Mousavi, the last Prime Minister of Iran (Campaign)
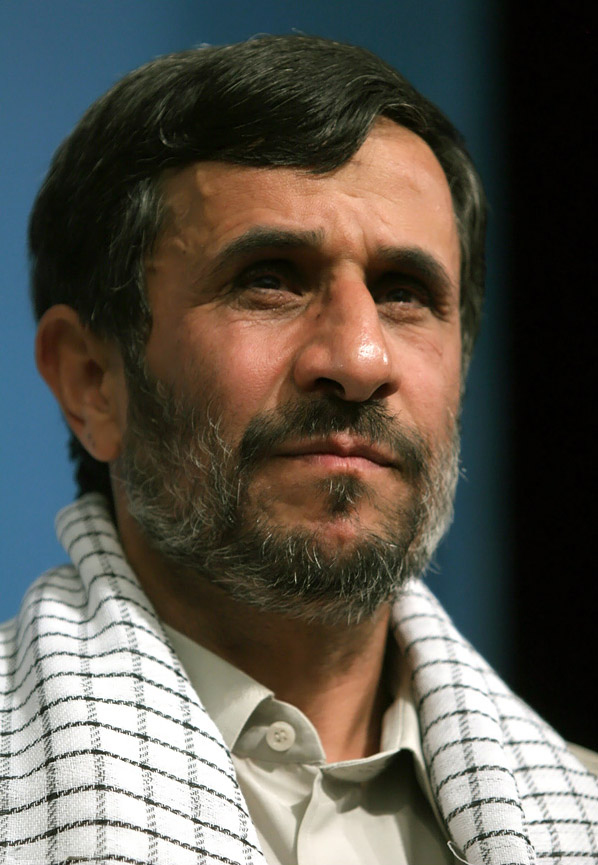
Mahmoud Ahmadinejad

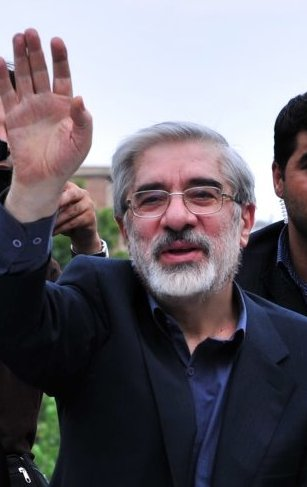
Mir-Hossein Mousavi

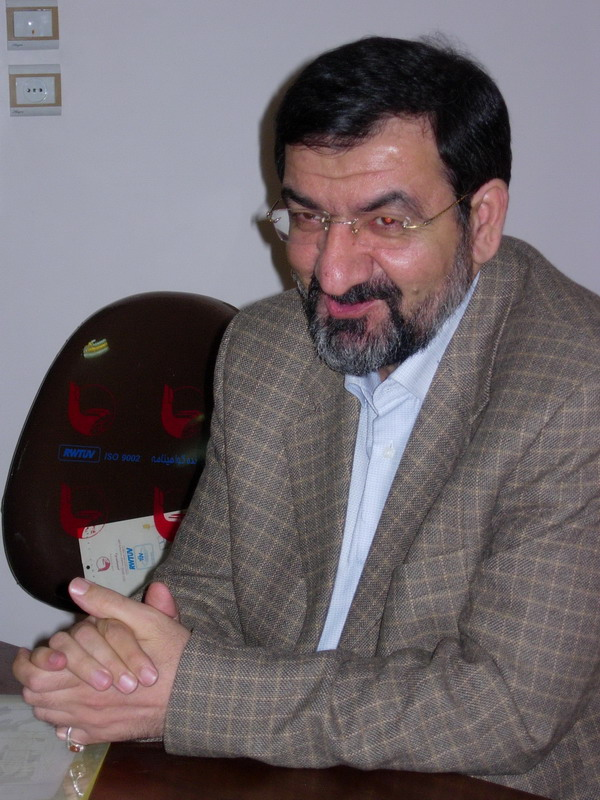
Mohsen Rezaee

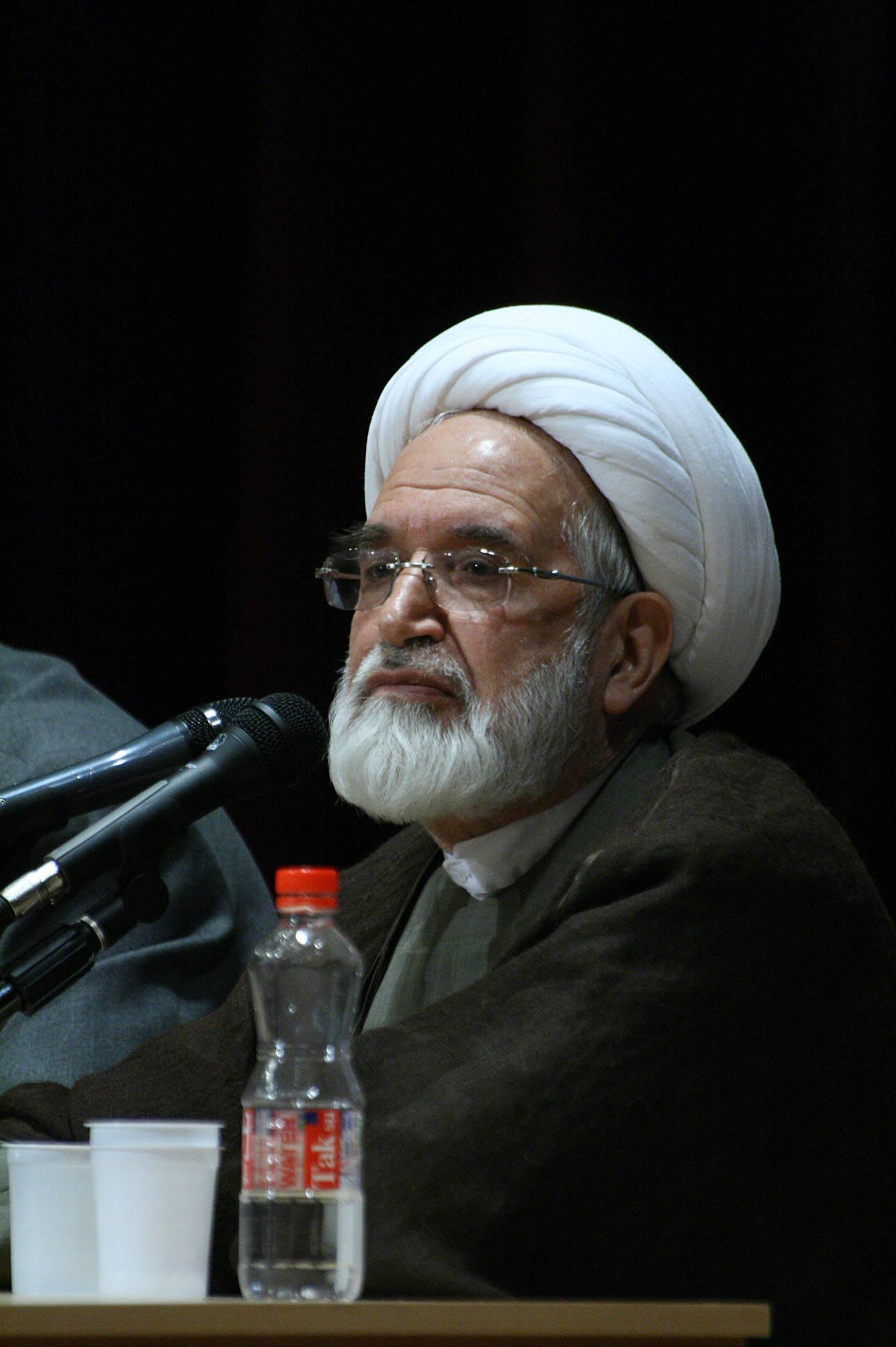
Mehdi Karoubi

=== Rejected candidates ===
Conservatives

- Rafat Bayat, female Majlis representative from Zanjan

Independents

- Akbar Alami, former Majlis representative from Tabriz
- Ghasem Sholeh-Saadi, former Majlis representative

=== Withdrawn candidates ===
- Mohammad Khatami, former President of Iran, endorsed Mousavi. (See article on Khatami presidential campaign for details.)

=== Declined candidates ===
The following people were said to be possible candidates in the election, but did not register within the five days allowed for registration.

Akbar Hashemi Rafsanjani, former president and chairman of the Assembly of Experts, would have been over 75 years old on the election day and therefore ineligible to run by election law.

Conservatives

- Mohammad Bagher Ghalibaf, Mayor of Tehran
- Ali Larijani, speaker of the Majlis
- Mostafa Pour Mohammadi, former Minister of the Interior
- Ali Akbar Velayati, Minister of Foreign Affairs 1981–97

Reformists

- Mohammad Reza Aref, former First Vice President
- Masoumeh Ebtekar
- Abdollah Nouri, former Minister of Interior, former Speaker of Tehran City Council

== Campaign ==
=== Background ===
The incumbent was Mahmoud Ahmadinejad. The Iranian reform movement attempted to unite behind a single candidate; former president Mohammad Khatami was the leading opponent to Ahmadinejad in some opinion polls, until he withdrew and endorsed former prime minister Mir-Hossein Mousavi. Former Speaker of the Majlis Mehdi Karroubi, another Reformist, was also running; as was the former commander of the Iranian Revolutionary Guard, Mohsen Rezaee, a conservative with a reputation for political pragmatism. The election marked a return to public spotlight for Mousavi, who had not received much attention since he served as Prime Minister in the 1980s. Reformist opinions galvanized around him as the election grew nearer. He became the symbol for a groundswell of youthful democratic sentiment, despite his personal background and political views.

The Telegraph described the campaign as "unusually open by Iranian standards, but also highly acrimonious". It was marked by heated rhetoric between the incumbent and his challengers. Mousavi and two other candidates said Ahmadinejad lied about the state of the economy, which was suffering from high inflation and a fall in oil revenues from last year's record levels. Ahmadinejad responded by comparing his opponents to Adolf Hitler, adding they could be jailed for their comments: "No one has the right to insult the president, and they did it. And this is a crime. The person who insulted the president should be punished, and the punishment is jail ... Such insults and accusations against the government are a return to Hitler's methods, to repeat lies and accusations ... until everyone believes those lies".

Debates about the economy played the biggest role in the campaign, with the global economic recession looming in peoples' minds. About one in five Iranians lived under the poverty line, inflation was about 25% and unemployment over 12.5 percent (some unofficial estimates reported 30%). Mousavi advocated further privatisation of the economy towards a free market, with a tight monetary policy in comparison to Ahmadinejad's populist fiscal policy. Ahmadinejad's measures to fight poverty were a central issue of his campaign. Mousavi drew his electoral base from the middle and upper classes, while Ahmadinejad drew support from the urban poor and rural residents. Civil servants, police officers, pensioners and others dependent on the government, also contributed to Ahmadinejad's base. He turned the financial support of the business class opposing him into a theme of attack. BBC News described his campaign as "one that foresees the death of capitalism".

Mousavi criticized Ahmadinejad for diplomatically isolating Iran by denying the Holocaust and making anti western speeches. He opposed the government's current strict enforcement of Islamic dress and social behavior, calling for an end to the regime's 'Vice Police'. He advocated letting private individuals and groups own Iranian media. Both candidates strongly supported further development of the Iranian nuclear program. However, Mousavi advocated a less combative and tense tone with other nations about it. He floated the idea of an international consortium overseeing uranium enrichment in Iran. The BBC stated about Mousavi: "[i]n foreign affairs, he seems to be offering little change on major issues". Council on Foreign Relations Senior Fellow, Mohamad Bazzi, stated: "if Mousavi wins, it could create a new opening for dialogue with the United States. Ahmadinejad's continued presence would be a major obstacle". Robert Fisk also remarked a Mousavi victory would mean closer ties with the U.S.

The campaign was the most expensive in the Islamic Republic's history, with the two main candidates spending over tens of millions of dollars in a bid to convince voters. Funds were spent on, among other things, mass distribution of digital propaganda such as CDs and DVDs. Another interesting phenomenon taking place during the campaign was a dramatic rise in text messages sent to Iranian cell phone subscribers – between 60 and 110 million. Mousavi adopted the traditional Islamic color of green as his campaign theme. Young male supporters wore green ribbons tied around their wrists and young female supporters wore green headscarves. Activists used the term 'change' as their primary slogan, chanting "green change for Iran", "together for change" and "vote for change".

=== Debates ===
From 2 to 8 June 2009 Islamic Republic of Iran Broadcasting reported nightly debates on TV channel IRIB 3 between two candidates at a time, with each candidate facing the others once. This was the first time Iran had held televised debates between candidates. Each debate lasted for around one and a half hours. During the debate on 3 June between President Ahmadinejad and reformist rival, former prime minister Mousavi, Ahmadinejad made accusations regarding former presidents Mohammad Khatami and Akbar Hashemi Rafsanjani and the Iranian revolution. Rafsanjani responded to these charges on 9 June in an open letter to Supreme Leader Ayatollah Ali Khamenei requesting that he stepped in to rebuke Ahmadinejad for his comments at the debate.

=== Endorsements ===
Organization	Coalition	Candidate
Islamic Coalition Party	Front of Followers of the Line of the Imam and the Leader	Mahmoud Ahmadinejad
Society of Devotees of the Islamic Revolution	Front of Followers of the Line of the Imam and the Leader	Mahmoud Ahmadinejad
Islamic Society of Workers	Front of Followers of the Line of the Imam and the Leader	Mahmoud Ahmadinejad
Islamic Society of Engineers	Front of Followers of the Line of the Imam and the Leader	Mahmoud Ahmadinejad
Followers of Islamic Revolution Society	Front of Followers of the Line of the Imam and the Leader	Mahmoud Ahmadinejad
Islamic Revolution fraction (parliamentary group)	Front of Followers of the Line of the Imam and the Leader	Mahmoud Ahmadinejad
Association of Combatant Clerics	Council for Coordinating the Reforms Front	Mir-Hossein Mousavi
Executives of Construction Party	Council for Coordinating the Reforms Front	Mir-Hossein Mousavi
Islamic Iran Participation Front	Council for Coordinating the Reforms Front	Mir-Hossein Mousavi
Mojahedin of the Islamic Revolution Organization	Council for Coordinating the Reforms Front	Mir-Hossein Mousavi
Islamic Iran Solidarity Party	Council for Coordinating the Reforms Front	Mir-Hossein Mousavi
Moderation and Development Party	Council for Coordinating the Reforms Front	Mir-Hossein Mousavi
Development and Justice Party	The Front of Unity of Islamic Iran	Mohsen Rezaee
National Trust Party		Mehdi Karrubi

=== Polling ===
The opinion polls within Iran were considered unreliable. A number of polls conducted between relatively small voting groups, like university students and workers, were reported as election propaganda. More general polls reported in the media did not state the polling organization nor the basic facts about the methodology. The results showed a high variance and depend heavily on who was reporting the poll. In 2002, the polling organization Ayandeh and another polling organization was closed and its directors were arrested. The director of Ayandeh, Abbas Abdi, spent several years in prison.

Mousavi's and Karroubi's campaign posters in Tehran claimed that a high turnout would reduce Ahmadinejad's chance of winning the election. Karroubi's campaign manager, Gholamhossein Karbaschi, claimed that the chance of Ahmadinejad losing the election would be over 65 percent if over 32 million people voted, but less than 35 percent if less than 27 million people voted.

An independent poll, conducted by Terror Free Tomorrow: The Center for Public Opinion, a nonprofit institute that researches attitudes toward extremism, found that Ahmadinejad was leading by a margin of 2 to 1. 34% said they would vote for Ahmadinejad, 14% favored Mousavi, 2% favored Karroubi, 1% favored Rezaee and 27% were undecided. The poll was taken from 11 to 20 May. The poll was carried out by a company whose work for ABC News and the BBC in the Middle East has received an Emmy award. Polling itself was funded by the Rockefeller Brothers Fund. Writing in The Washington Post, pollsters Ken Ballen and Patrick Doherty have used this to suggest that Ahmadinejad's apparent victory might reflect the will of the Iranian people. The poll was quoted by Reuters, Khaleej Times and Jim Muir of BBC News. However, the Irish Times, while quoting the poll, also pointed out that it was taken three weeks before the election, and electoral campaigning in Iran is only allowed for a period of 30 days prior to the election date, which means this poll was conducted only one week into the campaigning. Another critic of the poll, Mansoor Moaddel, pointed out that of "1,731 people contacted [by the poll], well over half either refused to participate (42.2%) or did not indicate a preferred candidate (15.6%)." For comparison, the average response rate in US for such telephonic surveys does not exceed 30%, while the minimum response rate for an opinion poll to be considered scientific by many leading academic journals is 50%.

A post-election national poll was conducted in late August and early September 2009 by the American polling agency, World Public Opinion, which is affiliated with the University of Maryland. Of the initial 46% respondents of the poll, 27% did not state their chosen candidate, 55% said that they had voted for Ahmadinejad. Both Mr Karroubi and Mr Rezai received minimal support. 87% of respondents replied that they had voted compared to 85% according to the official figures, which is within the margin of error provided. Also, the survey found that 62% of Iranians had "strong confidence" in the election result whilst 64% expressed a similar feeling towards the incumbent president. This finding almost exactly matches up with the proportion of the vote that Ahmadinejad received.

==== Polls by Western Organizations ====
Polling organisation	Date	Poll details	Candidate			
Polling organisation	Date	Poll details	Mahmoud Ahmadinejad	Mehdi Karroubi	Mir-Hossein Mousavi	Mohsen Rezaee
New America Foundation	11–20 May 2009	Nationwide; 1001 people, error margin +/-3.1% (27% undecided); (59% satisfied, 23% unsatisfied)	34%	2%	14%	1%
Global Scan	June 2009	reported by International Peace Institute and Charney Research	56%		32%	
University of Maryland	June 2009	reported by International Peace Institute and Charney Research	61%		37%	
WPO (World Public Opinion)	9 September 2009	Post-election national poll;1003 respondents in 30 provinces	55%	1%	14%	3%
WPO (World Public Opinion); On behalf of the Rockefeller Brothers Fund and the Calvert Foundation	27 August – 10 September 2009	Nationwide; stratified using provincial telephone area codes with random number generation. Around 83% of respondents reported some (21%) or a high level (62%) of confidence in the declared election results, while 13% percent reported little or no confidence in the results.	55% 49% (if new election held)	Unknown	14% 13% (if new election held)	Unknown
Charney Research	30 August – 7 September 2010	Nationwide, error margin +/-3.5%, (the governments crackdown on post-election protests: 59% was correct, 19% went too far, 10% refused to answer).	58%		36%	

==== Polls by Iranian Organizations ====
Polling organisation	Date	Poll details	Candidate			
Polling organisation	Date	Poll details	Mahmoud Ahmadinejad	Mehdi Karroubi	Mir-Hossein Mousavi	Mohsen Rezaee
Rahbord Danesh, reported by Tabnak	5 March 2009	Nationwide	44%	7%	13%	0%
Worker's Statistical Institute	late March 2009	Nationwide survey of workers	36%	8%	52%	Unknown
Rahbord Danesh, reported by Tabnak	4 April 2009	Nationwide	40%	8%	24%	1%
Government	before 3 May 2009	Unknown	54% (45% in Tehran)	Unknown	22% (29% in Tehran)	Unknown
	3 May 2009 – 4 May 2009	62 cities	59%	Unknown	22%	Unknown
Rahbord Danesh, reported by Tabnak	5 May 2009	Nationwide	38%	12%	32%	15%
Etemad-e-Melli	before 13 May 2009	Nationwide	1st	2nd	3rd	4th
reported by Ayandeh News	before 26 May 2009	10 major cities	34%	Unknown	38%	Unknown
reported by Ghalamnews (official Mousavi website)	before 27 May 2009	1650 people on Ghalamnews	35%	Unknown	54%	Unknown
ISPA (Iranian Students Polling Association)	29 May 2009	National, 11,285 people	54.8	4.7	21.3	2.6
Young Journalists Club (IRIB affiliated)	before 30 May 2009	Nationwide; 30,000 people	1st, with "considerable lead over Karroubi"	2nd	3rd	4th
Baznevis, reported by Tabnak	before 30 May 2009	Nationwide; 77,058 people	33%	3%	36%	27%
Aftab News, reported by Tabnak	before 30 May 2009	Nationwide; 18,391 people; (Who will you not vote for?)	28%	7%	62%	4%
Rahbord Danesh, reported by Tabnak	31 May 2009	Nationwide	32%	6%	36%	27%
	before 1 June 2009	major cities	53%	Unknown	36%	Unknown
Rahbord e Danesh, reported by Tabnak	before 3 June 2009	1743 people Khozestan, Tehran (1,3,4,14,15,22), Eastern Azarbaijan, Gilan, Middle and South Khorasan	29.5%	7.5%	37.5%	25.2%
reported by ILNA	before 5 June 2009	Nationwide 300,000 people	24.61%	10.72%	54.53%	10.14%
alleged secret Iranian government funded polls, leaked by Newsweek	before 6 June 2009	nationwide	6–8 million	Unknown	16–18 million	Unknown
IRIB, reported by Alef	before 7 June 2009	more than 16,000 people, 30 major cities in each Province	62.7	Unknown	25.7	Unknown
reported by Alef	before 8 June 2009	Major cities	61.7	Unknown	28	Unknown
reported by Rooz Online	before 9 June 2009	Nationwide; 7900 people	23%	Unknown	54%–57%	Unknown
Rahbord e Danesh, reported by Tabnak	before 9 June 2009	1743 people Khozestan, Tehran (1,3,4,14,15,22), Eastern Azarbaijan, Gilan, Middle and South Khorasan	25.5%	6.1%	37.6%	30.8%
ISPA (Iranian Students Polling Association)	10 June 2009	National	47	Unknown	31	Unknown

== Conduct ==
Two screenshots from IRINN, Iranian state-run television illustrating the apparent decrease in votes for candidate Mohsen Rezaee over a four-hour period. The upper picture shows Rezaee with 633,048 votes at 09:47; the lower shows the same candidate with 587,913 votes at 13:53 later that day. Mohsen Rezaee's official website published the screenshots and stated that never during the vote-counting in Iran had the counted votes of candidates dropped.

=== Pre-election violence ===
On 1 June, a campaign office of Ahmadinejad's primary opponent, Mir-Hossein Mousavi, was torched. The office was located in the city of Qom. No group claimed responsibility for the attack. At the same time, it was reported that an assassination had been attempted against former president Mohammad Khatami by means of a bomb placed on an aircraft he was to board.

=== Blocking of communications ===
Mobile phone communications were interrupted in Tehran on election day and the BBC has stated that "heavy electronic jamming" was being used to halt their broadcasts. On 23 May 2009, the Iranian government temporarily blocked access to Facebook across the country. Gulf News reported that this move was a response to the use of Facebook by candidates running against Ahmadinejad. PC World reported that Mousavi's Facebook page had more than 6,600 supporters. Access was restored by 26 May 2009.

=== Alleged vote rigging or coup attempt ===
The New York Times quoted an unnamed employee of the Interior Ministry claiming that "the government had been preparing its fraud for weeks, purging anyone of doubtful loyalty and importing pliable staff members from around the country." The New Yorker stated that "dissident employees of the Interior Ministry... have reportedly issued an open letter" saying that the election was stolen. The Guardian has also mentioned "reports of a leaked interior ministry figures allegedly suggesting Mousavi had won", although the article questioned the credibility of the report.

The Guardian reported on 17 June 2009 that an Iranian news website identified at least 30 polling sites with turnout over 100% and 200 sites with turnout over 95%. On 21 June 2009, a spokesman from the Guardian Council (an organ of the Iranian government) stated the number of votes cast exceeded the number of eligible voters in no more than 50 cities. The Council argued this was a normal phenomenon, which had also taken place in previous elections, as people are not obliged to vote where they had been born/registered.

On 18 June, Iranian film makers Marjane Satrapi and Mohsen Makhmalbaf appeared before Green Party members in the European Parliament to present a document allegedly received from a member of the Iranian electoral commission claiming that Mir-Hossein Mousavi had actually won the election, and that the conservative incumbent Mahmoud Ahmedinejad had received only 12% of the vote.

== Result ==
Candidate	Votes	%
Mahmoud Ahmadinejad	24,592,793	63.14
Mir-Hossein Mousavi	13,338,121	34.24
Mohsen Rezaee	681,851	1.75
Mehdi Karroubi	338,278	0.87
Total	38,951,043	100.00
Valid votes	38,951,043	98.93
Invalid/blank votes	420,171	1.07
Total votes	39,371,214	100.00
Registered voters/turnout	46,199,997	85.22
Source: Iran Data Portal

=== Analysis ===
According to Reza Esfandiari and Yousef Bozorgmehr, the election data was consistent with a natural outcome based on polling data, allowing for some possible fraud at the local level.

Mohtashami, former interior minister of Iran—who was in the election monitoring committee of Mousavi's campaign—claimed that, according to official censuses, the number of counted votes in 70 municipalities were more than the number of eligible voters who lived in those regions. In all those cities, Ahmadinejad won by 80% to 90%. However, "excess votes" have been common in all Iranian elections, partly due to the way eligible voters are counted. For example, the Interior Ministry based its calculation of eligible voters on birth certificate registrations. Iranians do not register to vote and hundreds of thousands regularly vote outside their own regions. Shemiran, which had the highest excess voter turnout (13 times the number of eligible voters), overwhelmingly voted for Mousavi.

On 17 June, Tabnak, the news agency close to defeated candidate Mohsen Rezaee—whose official vote tally was 678,240 votes in the election—stated that "Mohsen Rezaee, until yesterday afternoon, found evidence that proves at least 900,000 Iranians, who had sent in their national ID card numbers, voted for [him]." However, there is no way of independently verifying whether those who disclosed their ID numbers had actually voted for Rezaee.

BBC Iranian affairs analyst Sadeq Saba found abnormalities in the way results were announced. Instead of results by province, the "results came in blocks of millions of votes," with very little difference between the blocks in the percentages going to each candidate. This suggested that Mahmoud Ahmadinejad did equally well in rural and urban areas, while his three opponents did equally badly in their home regions and provinces as in the rest of the country. This contradicted "all precedent in Iranian politics", where Ahmadinejad had been very popular in rural areas and unpopular in the big cities, where ethnic minorities had favoured anti-establishment candidates, and where candidates had tended to carry their home provinces.

Another anomaly, according to British-based researcher Ali Alizadeh, is that a large turnout did not favour the opposition, since in elections, both in Iran and abroad, "those who usually don't vote, i.e. the silent majority, only come out when they want to change the status quo."

According to modern Middle Eastern and South Asian historian Juan Cole, there were several anomalies in the election results. Official reports gave Ahmadinejad 50% of the vote in Tabriz despite the fact that this was the capital of Mousavi's home province, Eastern Azerbaijan, where Mousavi's rallies were well attended and which has traditionally given good turnouts for even "minor presidential candidates" who came from the province. Ahmadinejad also won Tehran province by over 50%, but crucially lost to Mousavi in the actual city of Tehran and was also soundly beaten in the affluent suburb of Shemiran to the north of the capital.

Statistical analyses of the official election results were published in Journal of Applied Statistics, an online note, in blogs and in The Washington Post.

== Aftermath ==
=== Protests ===
Clashes broke out between police and groups protesting the election results from early morning on Saturday onward. Initially, the protests were largely peaceful. However, as time passed, they became increasingly violent. Some protesters began to get violent after the results of the election were announced. Angry crowds in Tehran broke into shops, tore down signs, and smashed windows. Civil unrest took place as protesters set fire to tyres outside the Interior Ministry building and others formed a human chain of around 300 people to close off a major Tehran street.

The demonstrations grew bigger and more heated than the 1999 student protests. Al Jazeera English described 13 June situation as the "biggest unrest since the 1979 revolution." It also reported that protests seemed spontaneous without any formal organization. Two hundred people protested outside Iran's embassy in London on 13 June. Yedioth Ahronoth stated that "tens of thousands" protested on 13 June. Demonstrators chanted phrases such as "Down with the dictator", "Death to the dictator", and "Give us our votes back". Mousavi urged for calm and asked that his supporters refrain from acts of violence.

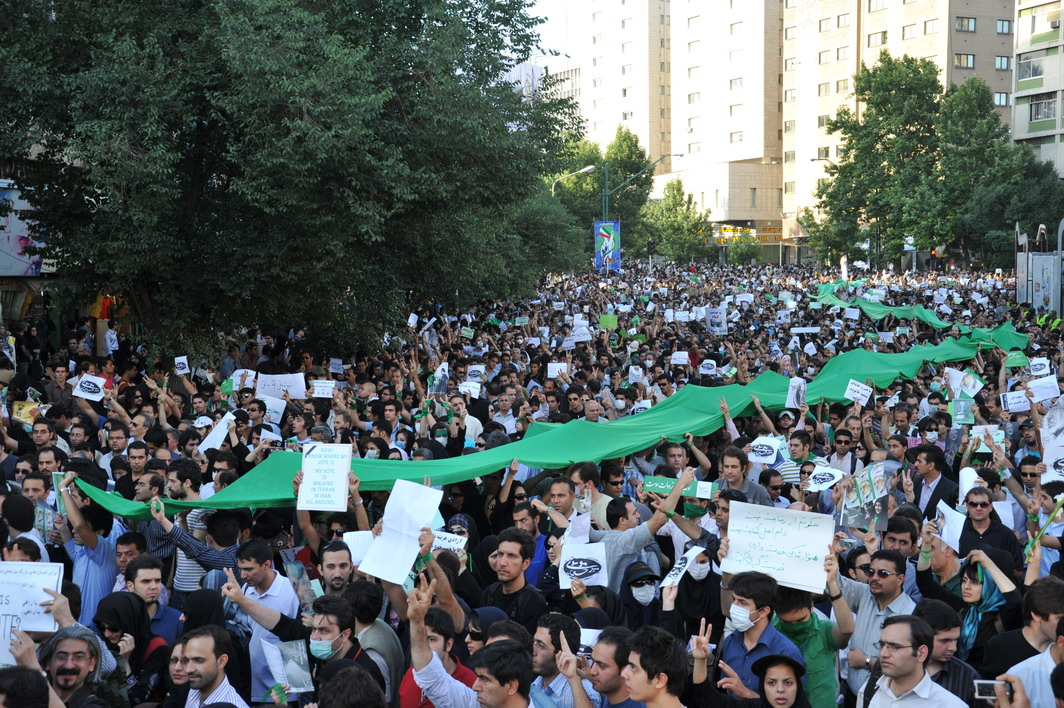
Protesters in Tehran, 16 June

Yedioth Ahronoth reported on 14 June that two people had died in the rioting so far. That day, protests had been organized in front of the Iranian embassies in Turkey, Dubai, Paris, Berlin, London, Rome, Sydney, Vienna and The Hague. In response to the reformist protests, tens of thousands of people rallied in Tehran on 14 June to support the victory of Ahmadinejad.

On 15 June, Mousavi rallied, with anywhere from hundreds of thousands to three million, of his supporters in Tehran, despite being warned by state officials that any such rally would be illegal. The demonstration was Mousavi's first public appearance after the election. Protests focused around Azadi Tower, around which lines of people stretched for more than nine kilometers met. Gunshots were reported to have been fired at the rally, where Mousavi had spoken to his supporters saying, "The vote of the people is more important than Mousavi or any other person." All three opposition candidates appeared.

Competing rallies for Mousavi and for Ahmadinejad took place on 16 June. The pro-Ahmadinejad protesters, chanting the phrases "Death to America!" and "Death to Israel!", outnumbered their opponents, but they did not match the numbers of opponents who had protested the day before. Reports from the state media and elsewhere stated on 16 June that seven people have died in all of the protests so far. However, The Times quoted a Rasoul Akram Hospital nurse that day who asserted that 28 people have suffered from "bullet wounds" and eight have died so far. Over half a million reformist Iranians marched silently from Haft-e-Tir Square to Vali Asr Square on 17 June. That day, the Iranian opposition group, "Human Rights Activists News Agency", stated that 32 people had died protesting during the events of 24 and 25 June.

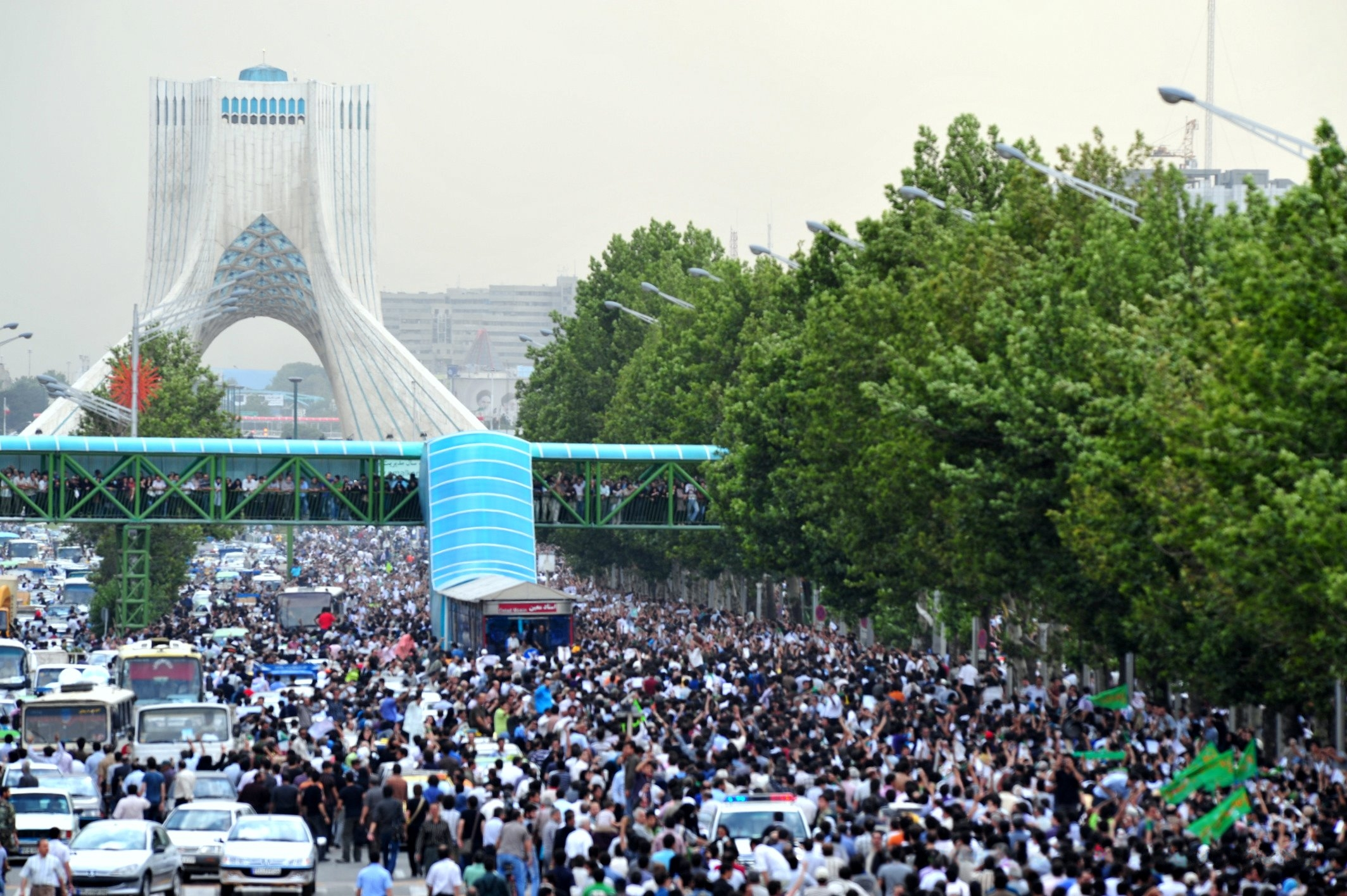
The Green Protest Rally in Azadi Tower and Square in Tehran.

=== Government actions ===
==== Arrests ====
On the weekend of 13 and 14 June, in a series of raids across Tehran, the government arrested over 170 people, according to police officials. Among them were prominent reformist politicians, including MIRO founder Behzad Nabavi, IIPF leader Mohsen Mirdamadi, and former president Mohammad Khatami's brother Mohammad-Reza Khatami, who was later released. Also arrested were Mostafa Tajzadeh and Mohsen Aminzadeh, whom the IRNA said were involved in orchestrating protests on 13 June. Anonymous sources said that the police stormed the headquarters of the IIPF and arrested a number of people. Iranian journalist Mashallah Shamsolvaezin claimed that Mousavi was put under house arrest, although officials denied this. An estimated 200 people were detained after clashes with students at Tehran university, although many were later released.

Acting Police Chief Ahmad-Reza Radan stated via the state press service on the 14th that "in the interrogation of related rebels, we intend to find the link between the plotters and foreign media". A judiciary spokesman said they had not been arrested but that they were summoned, "warned not to increase tension," and later released. Intelligence minister Gholam Hossein Mohseni-Ejehei linked some arrests to terrorism supported from outside Iran, stating that "more than 20 explosive consignments were discovered". Others, he said, were "counter-revolutionary groups" who had "penetrated election headquarters" of the election candidates.

On 16 June, Reuters reported that former vice-president Mohammad-Ali Abtahi and former presidential advisor Saeed Hajjarian had been arrested. Human rights lawyer Abdolfattah Soltani, who had been demanding a recount of all votes, was also arrested on the Tuesday according to Shirin Ebadi, who said that security officials had posed as clients. Over 100 students were arrested after security forces fired tear gas at protesters at Shiraz university on the same day. Reporters Without Borders reported that 5 of 11 arrested journalists were still detention as of 16 June, and that a further 10 journalists were unaccounted for and may have been arrested.

On 17 June, former foreign minister and secretary-general of the Freedom Movement of Iran, Ebrahim Yazdi, was arrested while undergoing tests at Pars hospital in Tehran. He was held overnight in Evin Prison before being released and returning to hospital, where according to Human Rights Watch he remained under guard. In Tabriz, other Freedom Movement activists and eight members of the IIPF were arrested, with reports of at least 100 civic figures' arrests. The total number of arrests across Iran since the election was reported as 500.

Aaron Rhodes, a spokesman for the international campaign for human rights in Iran, stated that "Iranian intelligence and security forces are using the public protests to engage in what appears to be a major purge of reform-oriented individuals whose situations in detention could be life-threatening". In Isfahan province, prosecutor-general Mohammadreza Habibi warned that dissidents could face execution under Islamic law.

==== Censorship allegations ====
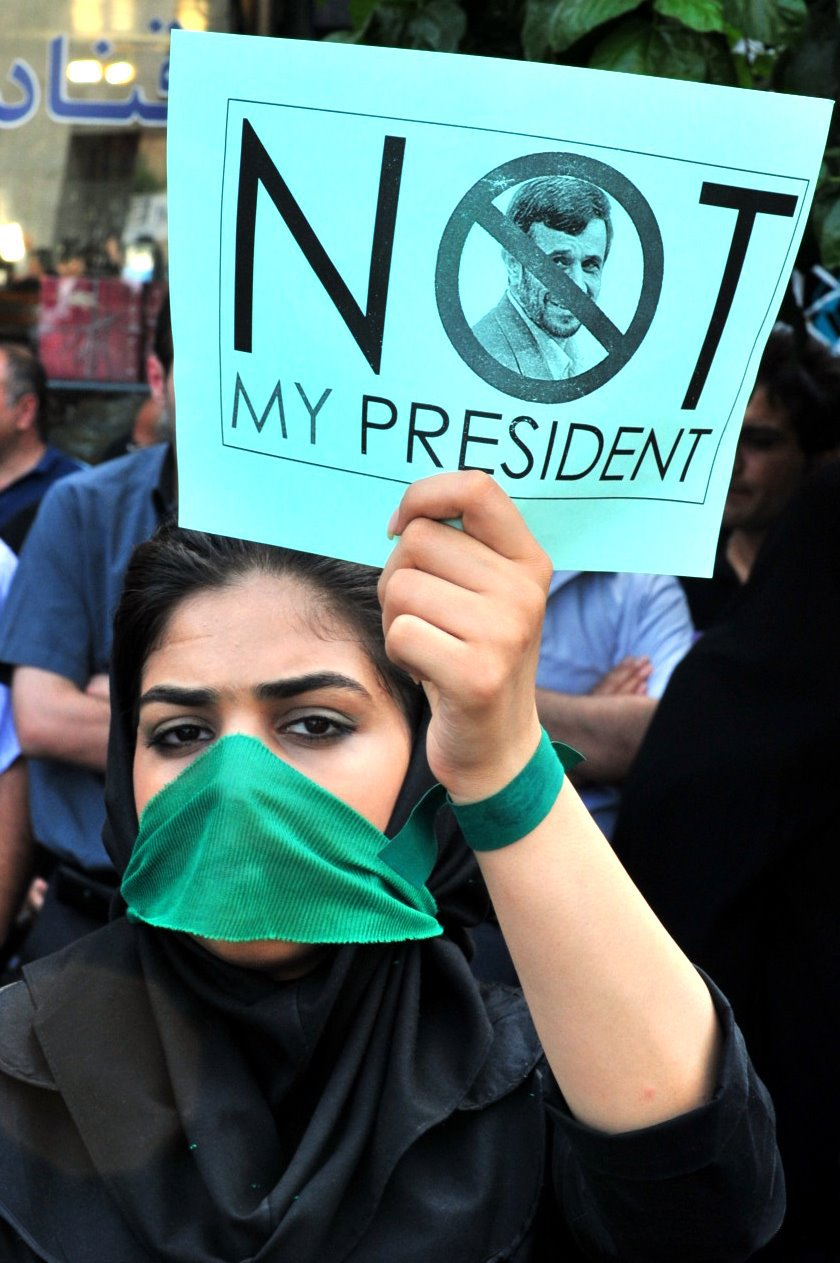
A reformist protester holding a placard

According to the Telegraph, on 14 June "Iran's regime was doing its utmost to choke off the flow of news from its capital." Reporters from the Italian public television broadcaster RAI stated that one of its interpreters was beaten with clubs by riot police and the officers then confiscated the cameraman's tapes. The Al Arabiya's offices in Tehran were closed on 14 June for a week by Iranian authorities, who gave no explanation for the decision. Meanwhile, the director of BBC World Service accused the Iranian Government of jamming its broadcasts to the country. Peter Horrocks said audiences in Iran, the Middle East and Europe had been affected by an electronic block on satellites used to broadcast the BBC Persian Television signal to Iran, adding: "It seems to be part of a pattern of behaviour by the Iranian authorities to limit the reporting of the aftermath of the disputed election".

Al Jazeera English leveled allegations of direct media censorship by the Iranian government, stating that "some of the newspapers have been given notices to change their editorials or their main headlines". BBC correspondent John Simpson was arrested, his material confiscated, and then released. NBC News offices in Tehran were raided, with cameras and other equipment confiscated. ABC News reporter Jim Sciutto also has had material taken. People from the German public broadcasters ZDF and ARD have been harassed as well, with men carrying batons and knives reportedly storming the ARD's Tehran office. A BBC corporate official has referred to the network's conflict with the regime as 'electronic warfare'.

On 13 June 2009, when thousands of opposition supporters clashed with the police, Facebook was filtered again. Some news websites were also blocked by the Iranian authorities. Mobile phone services including text messaging also stopped or became very difficult to use. Specifically, all websites affiliated with the BBC were shut off, as were ones with The Guardian. Associated Press labeled the actions "ominous measures apparently seeking to undercut liberal voices". The restrictions were likely intended to prevent Mousavi's supporters from organizing large-scale protests. The protesters used phone calls, e-mails and word of mouth to get around the measures.

Ahmadinejad has responded to concerns by saying, "[d]on't worry about freedom in Iran... Newspapers come and go and reappear. Don't worry about it." In response to the crackdown, anti-regime activists have repeatedly taken down Ahmadinejad's and Khamenei's websites. According to CNN, the United States State Department has worked with Twitter to expand the website's access in Iran.

==== Recount ====
Due to opposition protests, the Supreme Leader approved a partial vote recount. This was random, counting 10% of ballots. In order to create transparency, a 12 member council showed the recount on TV and concluded President Ahmadinejad led Mousavi after the recount. The Guardian council certified the election and concluded no evidence of irregularities, closing the election's dossier.

==== Scapegoats ====
The Iranian government blamed the unrest on a variety of targets, including the Baháʼí Faith who served as "canaries in the coal mine of Iran's theocracy" as Iran's largest religious minority by their state sanctioned persecution and as "scapegoats". Gholam-Ali Haddad-Adel, a Member of Parliament (and previously the Speaker of Parliament) even claimed that BBC stands for Baháʼí Broadcasting Company and made other allegations of Baháʼí involvement with outside parties like the Israeli, British and American governments, though some claim that these accusations had little to do with the religion and rather seemed to be a part of an Islamic repertoire of what a heresy is supposed to look like, and are "categorically rejected" by the Baháʼís.

=== Iranian political reactions ===
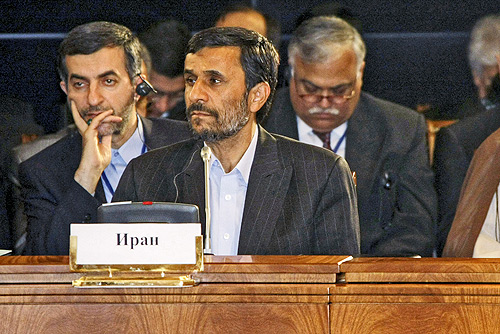
Mahmoud Ahmadinejad on 16 June 2009, in Yekaterinburg, Russia

- Supreme Leader Ayatollah Ali Khamenei initially urged the country to unite behind Ahmadinejad, labeling a victory by him as a "divine assessment." On 15 June, however, he ordered an investigation into the claims of vote fraud. Referring to Mousavi's appeal letter about the irregularities, Khamenei said "the Guardian Council has been emphasized to carry out investigation into this letter carefully," and probe allegations of Ahmadinejad cheating.
- Former Interior Minister Sadeq Mahsouli said that he had not received any "written complaint" about election fraud or irregularities. He also remarked that the vote proceeded in a way that "ruled out the possibility of cheating."
- Chairman of the Assembly of Experts Akbar Hashemi Rafsanjani was reported to have called a meeting of the Assembly, as they had the constitutional power to elect and dismiss the Supreme Leader.
- Incumbent President Mahmoud Ahmadinejad, in a live address on state run television on 13 June, called the election "completely free" and the outcome "a great victory" for Iran. He also said, "[t]oday, the people of Iran have inspired other nations and disappointed their ill-wishers... propaganda facilities outside Iran and sometimes inside Iran were totally mobilized against our people." Ahmadinejad praised the country's youth as well, but made no direct mention of the protests. He later dismissed the protests, comparing them to "the passions after a football match." In his 25 September 2009 speech at the UN he stated "Our nation has successfully gone through a glorious and successfully democratic election, ... They entrusted me once more with a large majority ..."
- Mir-Hossein Mousavi, the main opposition candidate, issued a statement saying, "I'm warning that I won't surrender to this manipulation." Mousavi lodged an official appeal against the result to the Guardian Council on 14 June. He was not optimistic about his appeal, saying that many of the group's members "during the election were not impartial."
- Reformist cleric Mehdi Karroubi, another opposition candidate, echoed Mousavi's demand for the election to be cancelled. He said, "I am announcing again that the elections should not be allowed and the results have no legitimacy or social standing... Therefore, I do not consider Mahmoud Ahmadinejad as president of the republic." He later declared in a speech to his supporters in Khoramabad that "this phase ["election dispute"] will not subside until we [Reformist leaders] suggest so."
- Mohsen Rezai, on 17 June, gave an ultimatum to Interior Ministry to release details of the results by that day, otherwise, he would call for a new election. However, on 24 July he withdrew formal complaints filed with the Guardian Council, saying that "The [current] political, social and security situation has entered a sensitive and decisive phase, which is more important than the election."
- Gholam Ali Haddad Adel, a former Iranian parliamentary speaker, called on Mousavi to concede defeat, saying that then "everyone will benefit".
- The Association of Combatant Clerics, a moderate reformist clerical body which former president Khatami is a member of, issued a statement posted on reformist websites saying the election was rigged and calling for it to be canceled, warning that "if this process becomes the norm, the republican aspect of the regime will be damaged and people will lose confidence in the system."
- Former foreign minister Ibrahim Yazdi said, "[w]e don't have any doubt. And as far as we are concerned, it is not legitimate. There were many, many irregularities." He also described the process as a "coup". On 17 June, he was arrested and transferred to prison.
- Reformist politician Ata'ollah Mohajerani blasted the election as "The End of the Islamic Republic".
- Hadi Ghaemi, spokesman for the International Campaign for Human Rights in Iran, denounced the outcome. He also compared the government's post-election activities to those of the Chinese government during the Tiananmen Square protests of 1989.
- In a letter published on his website, reformist cleric Grand Ayatollah Hossein-Ali Montazeri stated that the government used elections "in the worst way possible. Declaring results that no one in their right mind can believe, and despite all the evidence of crafted results, and to counter people protestations, in front of the eyes of the same nation who carried the weight of a revolution and 8 years of war, in front of the eyes of local and foreign reporters, attacked the children of the people with astonishing violence. And now they are attempting a purge, arresting intellectuals, political opponents and scientists."
- The Iranian national football team wore green wristbands in support for Mousavi in a World Cup qualifier against South Korea.
- Popular classical musician Mohammad Reza Shajarian demanded that Iranian government television and radio never play his music again after Ahmadinejad called Mousavi supporters "brushwood and thorns". Shajarian remarked, "my voice is like brushwood and thorns".
- British politician George Galloway has stated that Ahmadinejad "is the president of an important country and we'll just have to accept it."
- According to three Iranian newspapers 105 of 290 members of the Iranian Parliament invited to attend a 24 June victory party for Mahmoud Ahmadinejad attended the event, suggesting, according to the American The New York Times newspaper, "a deep divide within the political elite over the election and its aftermath."
- In his 19 June address to the nation after Friday prayers, Supreme Leader Ayatollah Ali Khamenei defended the reputations of Hashemi Rafsanjani and Ali Akbar Nateq-Nouri despite the fact that "Never before have I mentioned people by name in the Friday prayer sermons" adding that "The live televised debates were a positive step, but these (accusations against fellow candidates) should be removed. After the debates, I had a talk with the president because I knew he would listen to me." This amounted to a criticism of Ahmadinejad, who had made accusations against Nateq-Nouri's family during the debate and accused Rafsanjani of being "corrupt" and whom he had called "the main puppet master."

=== International reactions ===
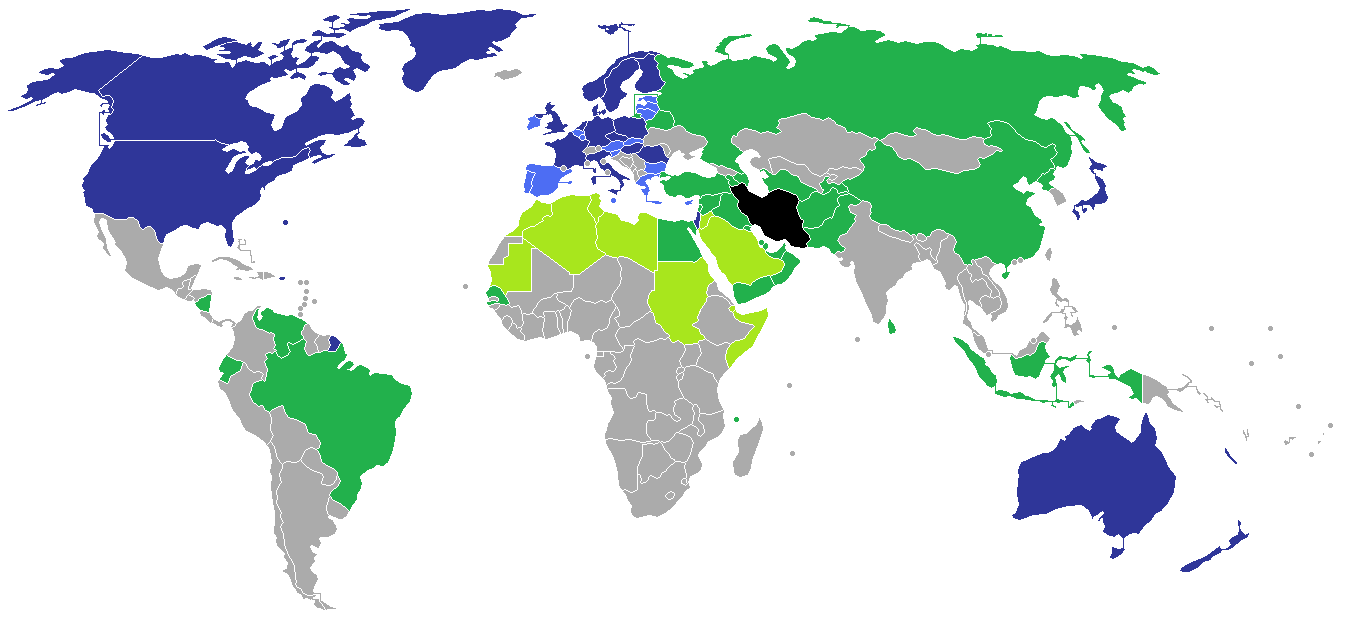
Map of countries by reaction to the 2009 presidential election Iran Countries that have welcomed the results Arab League members that have not reacted publicly to the results (the Arab League has welcomed the results) European Union members that have not reacted publicly to the results (the EU has expressed doubts over the results) Countries that have expressed doubts over the results No data

Many western countries expressed doubt about the result and/or reacted in favour of protestors. Other countries, namely Brazil and some other Asian countries, amongst others, welcomed the result.

== See also ==
- 2009 Iran poll protests trial
- Iranian Green Movement (outdated)
- 2013 Iranian presidential election
