= Nabavian =

Nabavian is a surname. Notable people with the surname include:

- Amirali Nabavian (born 1980),Iranian author, presenter, host and actor
- Mahmoud Nabavian, Iranian cleric and politician
