= Footballism =

Iranian TV program

- Written by: Amir Vafa
- Directed by: Mohammad Davoudi
- Presented by: Amir Ali Nabavian
- Country of origin: Iran
- Original language: Persian

Production
- Producer: Saeed Parvini
- Editor: Amirhossein Tamannaei
- Camera setup: Multi-camera
- Running time: Wednesdays night

Original release
- Network: IRIB TV3
- Release: 1 August 2018

Footballism (Persian: فوتبالیسم) is an Iranian, Persian language, popular weekly television program broadcast by Channel 3 in Iran. The host of the program is Amirali Nabavian. The main subject of the program is the criticism of the sociopolitical aspects of football.

== Reception ==
Farheekhtegan published a paper on the strengths and weaknesses of the program.
