= Azad News Agency =

Iranian news agency

Azad News Agency (ANA)
- Motto: Self-belief, hope and movement
- Type: News agency
- Country: Iran
- Founded: July 2004
- Headquarters: Tehran, Iran
- Broadcast area: Worldwide
- Owner: Islamic Azad University
- Key people: Mohammad Mahdi Kheirjou (CEO)
- Official website: ana.ir

Azad News Agency (ANA) (Persian: خبرگزاری دانشگاه آزاد (آنا)) is an Iranian news agency which was launched on May 19, 2004, at the Human Science Department of Islamic Azad University. The News-Agency is active in three languages of Persian, English and Arabic. The owner of the agency is Islamic Azad University; and Mohammad Mahdi Kheirjou is the current CEO of ANA.

According to the agency head:

"Azad News Agency was launched in order to develop information dissemination and create a change in the field of university-activities...; On the other hand, ANA is organized to be active in diverse departments of (Islamic) Azad University."

== See also ==
- Student News Network
