= Borna News Agency =

Iranian news agency

- Type: News agency
- Founded: 2007
- Headquarters: Iran
- Key people: Yaser Sadeghi (CEO)
- Website: borna.news

Borna News Agency (Persian: خبرگزاری برنا) is an Iranian state-affiliated news agency.

== History ==
Borna News Agency was established in 2007. It is affiliated with Iran's Ministry of Sport and Youth, who appoints the agency's CEO. The current CEO is Yaser Sadeghi.

In December 2016, social affairs editor Tahereh Riahi was arrested and imprisoned on charges of spreading anti-government propaganda. She was released on bail in June 2017 but sentenced to two and half years in prison in 2019.

== Content ==
Borna News Agency states it aims to be the voice of Iran's younger generation, as well as athletes.

A 2026 Media, War & Conflict research article discussed Borna News Agency as an example of sports media that adopted narratives aligned with war journalism and propaganda.
