= Iran Book News Agency =

Book news agency in Iran

- Native name: ایبنا
- Company type: Broadcast and online
- Founded: 2006
- Headquarters: Tehran, Iran
- Owner: Iran Book House
- Website: www.ibna.ir

The Iran Book News Agency (IBNA) is the first and only book news agency in Iran.

== History ==
The Iran Book News Agency was established in 2006 in order to report on news about published books. The activities in IBNA are supervised by the Iran Book House. In addition to publishing news, IBNA offers updated reports, interviews and analyses of various foundations and organizations working in different publication fields.

== See also ==
- List of Iranian news agencies
