= Eslahatnews =

Newspaper

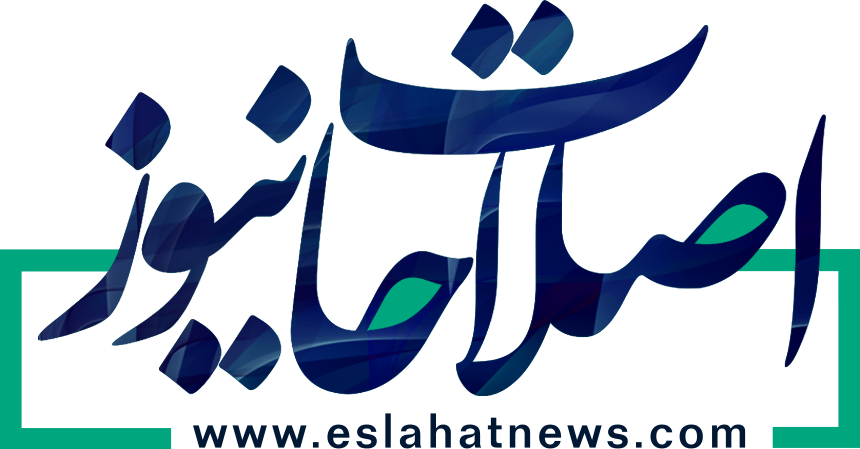
- Type: news
- President: Ali Ahmadnia
- Founded: January 1, 2014; 12 years ago
- Language: persian
- Website: eslahatnews.com

Eslahat News (Persian: اصلاحات نیوز) is a news agency in Iran. This media is closely related to the reformist political current in Iran.

== History ==
Eslahat News was launched in 2014 on the Telegram messenger platform. In 2016, before the Iranian presidential election, the news outlet was banned for more than a year, but after the release of Ali Ahmadnia it resumed its activities. Eslahat News is known in Iran as a reformist faction-affiliated news outlet.

"Eslahat News", "Havadaran-e-Ruhani"," Majma-e-Eslahtalaban", "Eslahtalaban News", " Zendebad Eslahat", "Daneshjouyan-e-Eslahtalab" and "Hamiyan-e-Khatami Dar Yazd" were the names of a number of Telegram channels whose administrators lost control of their administrations during the presidential election.

=== Detention of Telegram channel managers ===
Shortly after its launch, Eslahat News became one of Telegram's most influential news media, with more than 150,000 member users. In March 2016, a few months before the presidential and Tehran City Council elections, its founder and editor, Ali Ahmadnia, was arrested by Iranian Security Agencies for six months on charges of conspiracy to commit security offenses, and the activity of this news media was stopped. The incident sparked widespread protests by the president and members of the Islamic Consultative Assembly.

After these arrests, 30 representatives of the Ministry of Intelligence were asked about the fate of the admins' case of the 5 Telegram channels to the Board of Directors of the Islamic Consultative Assembly

== News field ==
This media has news pages with political, economic, social, Iranian parliament, women's issues, and other categories of news. Eslahat News has repeatedly published articles criticizing the current situation in Iran and has tried to achieve greater civil liberties such as women's and workers rights, which has been republished by other news media. Interviews with Ali Jannati and Abdullah Ramezanzadeh were conducted by this news media as well.

== See also ==
- List of Iranian news agencies
