= Mohammad Qomi =

Iranian cleric

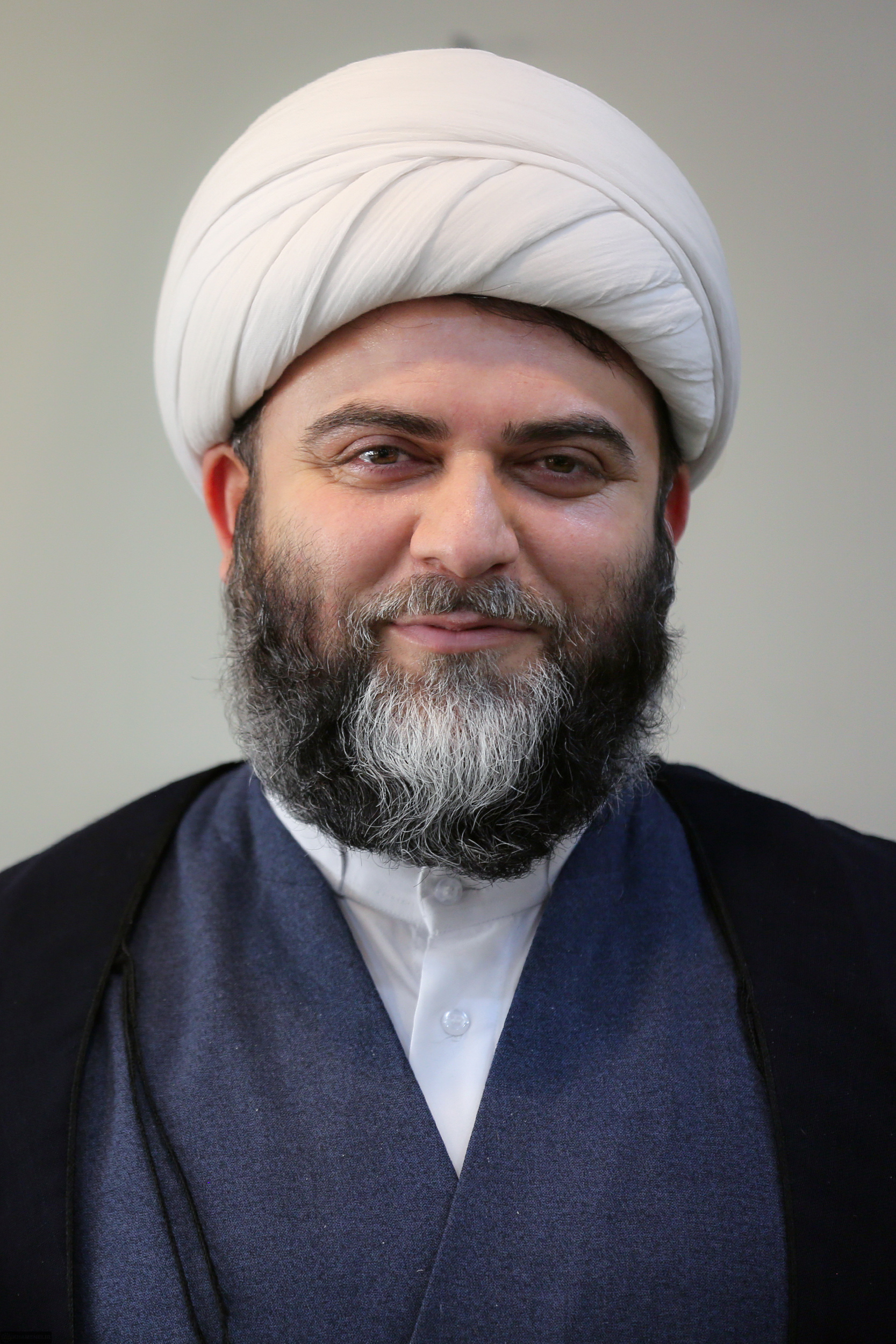
Mohammad Qomi, Iranian politician and Shia cleric

Mohammad Qomi (Persian: محمد قمی), also known as Hujjat al-Islam (Mohammad) Qomi (born in 1980), is an Iranian Shia cleric and the head of Islamic development organization who has been recently appointed (at the age of 38) instead of Seyyed Mahdi Khammoushi, by the decree of the Supreme Leader of Iran, Sayyid Ali Khamenei.

Before being appointed in this position, he was the supervision in the institution of Vilayat-e Faqih representation, in Sharif University of Technology. During his Seminary education, he had different teachers, amongst:

Mahmoud Hashemi Shahroudi, Abdollah Javadi-Amoli, Sobhani, Shobeiri Zanjani, Shab Zendedar, Fayazi, Hosseini, Golpayegani, Yazdan Panah, Eshtehardi, Sadeq Amoli-Larijani and so on.
