= Amirali Nabavian =

Iranian author, presenter, host and actor

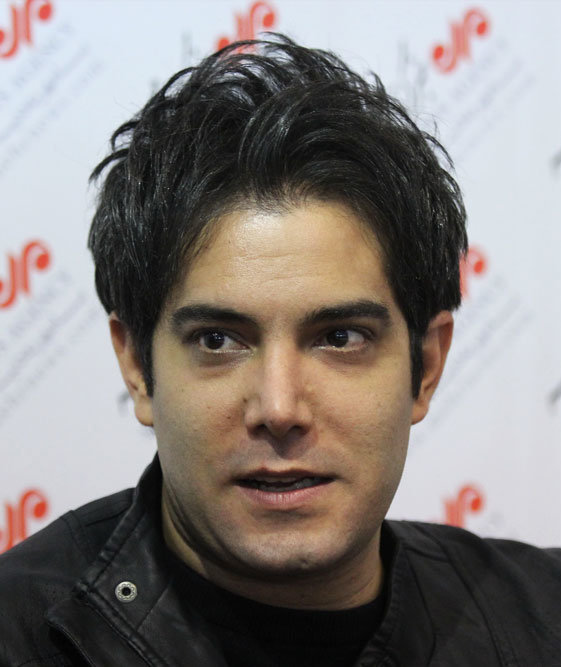
- Nabavian in 2016
- Born: March 22, 1980 (age 46); Amol, Mazandaran, Iran
- Education: Mazandaran University of Science and Technology (BS)
- Occupations: Author; presenter; host; actor
- Spouse: Bahar Norouzpour (m. 2016)

Amirali Nabavian (Persian: امیرعلی نبویان; born March 22, 1980) is an Iranian author, presenter, host and actor. He is best known for his books The Tales of Amirali trilogy and his presentation in television programs Radio 7 and Khandevaneh. He gained recognition for his playing in Mafia Nights and Godfather.

== Filmography ==
=== Film ===
Year	Title	Role	Director	Notes	Ref(s)
2015	The Girl's House	Reza	Shahram Shah Hosseini		
2017	Yellow	Behnam	Mostafa Taghizadeh		

=== Web ===
Year	Title	Role	Director	Platform	Ref(s)
2021	Mafia Nights	Himself	Saeed Aboutaleb	Filimo	
2022–2023	Godfather	Himself	Saeed Aboutaleb	Filmnet	
2023	Secret Army	Himself	Saeed Aboutaleb	Filimo	
2024	Oscar	Himself	Mehran Modiri	Filimo	
2024	Iranian Dinner	Himself	Saeed Aboutaleb	Filimo	
2025	Mafia: Don	Himself	Mohammad Reza Derakhshan	Filmnet	

=== Television ===
Year	Title	Role	Director	Network	Notes	Ref(s)
2011	Bravo Shiraz	Himself	Ahmad Hejazi	IRIB TV5	TV program	
2012–2015	Radio 7	Himself	Mansour Zabetian, Mohammad Soufi	IRIB Amoozesh	TV program	
2013	Panacea	Hamzeh	Javad Ardakani	IRIB TV1	TV series	
2016, 2021–2022	Khandevaneh	Himself	Rambod Javan	IRIB Nasim	TV program	
2018–2019	Footballism	Himself	Mohammad Foad Safarian Pour	IRIB TV3	TV program	

== Bibliography ==
- The Tales of Amirali 1 (2012)
- The Tales of Amirali 2 (2012)
- The Tales of Amirali 3 (2014)
- City of Grief (2017)
- As If It Had Never Existed (2020)
