= Fararu =

Iranian News Website

- Type: News agency
- Country: Iran
- Headquarters: Marzdaran St., Tehran, Iran
- Area: Worldwide
- Key people: Mohammad Hossein Khoshvaght, Mohammad Novin
- Official website: fararu.com

Fararu (Persian: فرارو) is a private news agency in Iran. Its purpose is to improve the free dissemination of information and enhance the national interests of Iran. It is ranked among the top 100 websites in Iran.
