= Tehran Times =

Iranian newspaper

- Straight Truth

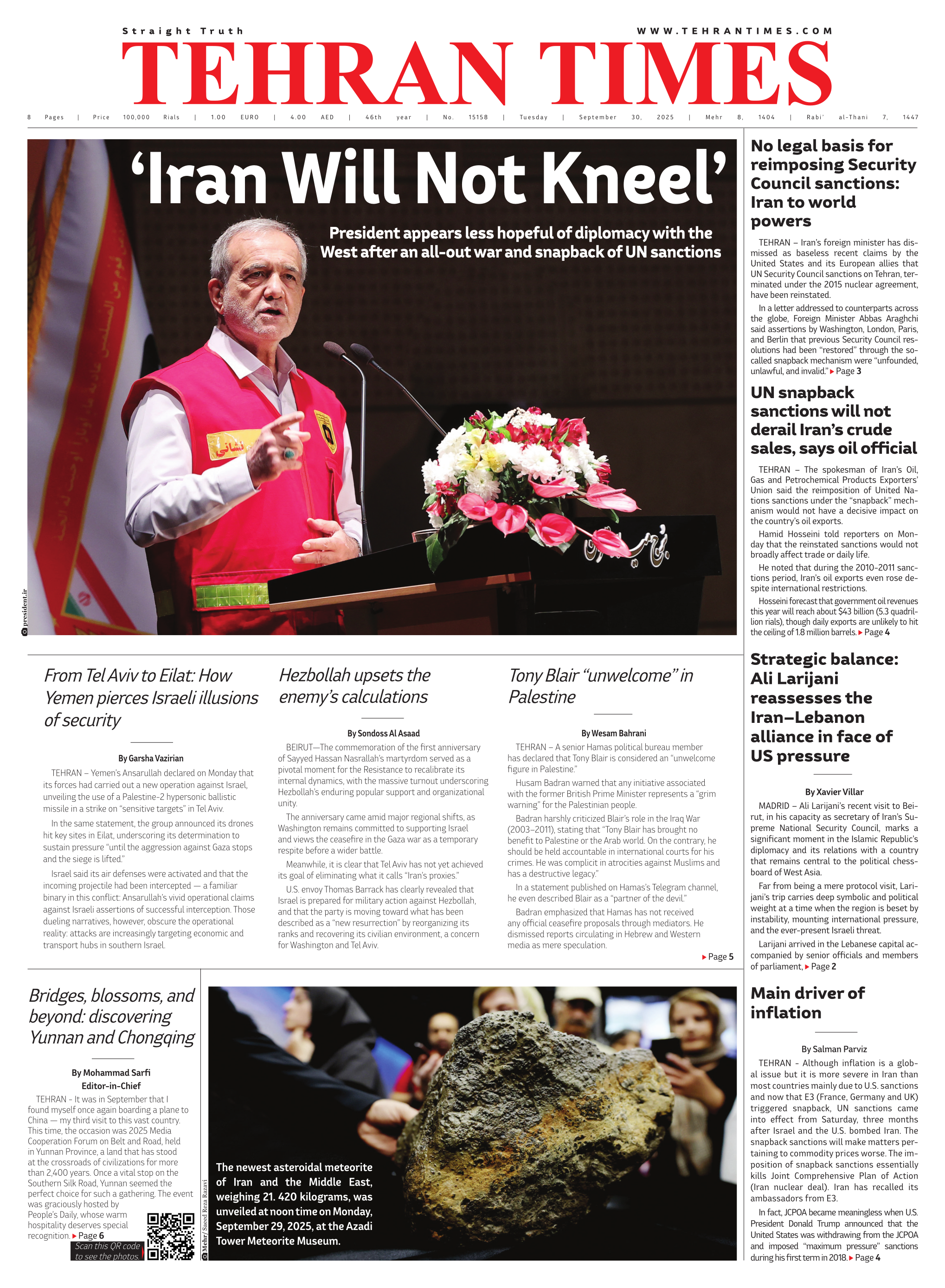
- Front page on 30 September 2025
- Type: Daily newspaper; Internet resource
- Format: Broadsheet
- Owner: Mehr News Agency
- Editor-in-chief: Mohammad Sarfi; Ali Akbar Jenabzadeh; Mohammad Ghaderi
- Founded: May 21, 1979; 47 years ago
- Political alignment: Pro-Islamic Republic
- Language: English
- Headquarters: Villa Street, Taleghani Ave, Tehran, Iran
- ISSN: 1563-860X
- OCLC number: 49910014
- Website: www.tehrantimes.com

The Tehran Times is an English-language daily newspaper published in Iran, founded in 1979 as a "voice of the Islamic Revolution". While not state-owned, it is considered state-controlled and closely tied to the hardline factions within the Iranian government.

== History ==
The newspaper was founded by Mohammad Beheshti in 1979 following the Iranian Revolution as the "voice of the Islamic Revolution".

In Oktober 2010 Reza Moqaddasi took over as the new head of the Tehran Times (TT) and the Mehr News Agency (MNA) for a four-year term, replacing the former Managing Director Parviz Esmaeili. He resigned after 3 and half years for health reasons. Therefore in May 2014 Hajottoleslam Khamoshi, the head of Iran’s Islamic Ideology Dissemination Organization (IIDO), appointed Ali Askari as the new director of TT and MNA. In September 2019 Mohammad Shojaeian was introduced as the new managing director of the TT and the MNA.

In April 2020 the CEO of Mehr Media Group, Mohammad Shojaeian, appointed Ali Akbar Jenabzadeh (Persian: علی اکبر جناب‌زاده) – as successor of Mohammad Ghaderi – as the editor-in-chief of the Tehran Times daily newspaper.

In April 2023 the head of IIDO, Hojjat aleslam Mohammad Qomi, appointed Mohammad Mehdi Rahmati as the new managing director of the Mehr Media Group to replace Mohammad Shojaeian Zanjani. Since early 2023 Tehran Times Editor-in-Chief is Mohammad Sarfi (Persian: محمد صرفی).

In August 2023, Tehran Times published a United States Department of State memo informing U.S. Special Envoy for Iran Rob Malley of his security clearance suspension. The publication prompted calls by Republicans in the U.S. House of Representatives and U.S. Senate for a probe into how the newspaper acquired the information.

== Editorial position ==
Ayatollah Mohammad Hossein Beheshti, second in line in the political hierarchy following the 1979 Islamic Revolution, stated: "Tehran Times is not a state-owned newspaper, rather it is a loud voice of the Islamic Revolution and the oppressed people of the world.” Although the newspaper is not state-owned, "it aims to disseminate key tenets of the Islamic Revolution and is therefore generally supportive of the Islamic Republic of Iran's ideology".

== See also ==
- List of newspapers in Iran
