= Cord A. Scott =

American academic

Cord Scott

Academic background
- Education: Minot State University, Baylor University, Loyola University Chicago

Academic work
- Main interests: Comic books, American cultural history

Cord A. Scott is an American academic who studies “war themed comics from World War II to Operation Iraqi Freedom”. Scott has published one book and a number of articles in academic journals that more closely examine the role of comic books in social history.

== Academic life ==
Cord Scott earned a BA degree in history from Minot State University in 1991 and an MA in international relations from Baylor University in 1992. In 2011, Cord Scott received his PhD in American history from Loyola University Chicago.

The topic of his dissertation was Comics and Conflict: War and Patriotically Themed Comics in American Cultural History From World War II Through the Iraq War and it looked closely at how "war- and patriotically-themed comics evolved" and served as "a mirror of American society" during times of conflict.

He has taught as an adjunct professor at a number of Chicago area schools including Harold Washington College and Triton College. He also spent a year teaching at the University of Maryland University College in Okinawa, Japan as a professor of liberal arts.

== Career ==
Partly due to his experiences as an educator, Scott served as a consultant on the 2012 documentary-based TV show Inside World War II. He also consulted for the Pritzker Military Museum and Library's exhibition “Don’t Be a Dope: Training Comics in World War II and the Korean War" that opened in 2012.

=== Publications ===
- "Written in Red, White, and Blue: A Comparison of Comic Book Propaganda from World War II and September 11", published in 2007 in the Journal of Popular Culture
- "The Alpha and the Omega: Captain America and the Punisher", a chapter in book Captain America and the Struggle of the Superhero: Critical Essays published in March 2009.
- "From HYDRA to Al-Qaeda: Depictions of Terrorism in Comic Books", presented at Purdue University in 2011.

Cord Scott expanded his PhD dissertation into a book that was published in September 2014 by the Naval Institute Press. It draws on many of his previous publications.

== Personal life ==
Scott is currently teaching at the University of Maryland Global Campus.
