= Mehrdad New York =

Iranian-American singer (died 2023)

- Born: Jafar Aghashariati; 24 September 1947; Ahvaz, Imperial State of Iran
- Died: 30 December 2023 (aged 76); Tehran, Imperial State of Iran
- Cause of death: Homicide
- Citizenship: United States
- Occupation: Singer
- Known for: Singing career; Murder and body burning case
- Notable work: "Vatan Mimiram Barayat", "Khoshgela", "Doost Dokhtare Man Naze"

Mehrdad New York (born Jafar Aghashariati; September 24, 1947 – December 30, 2023) was an Iranian-American singer who was murdered in Iran in 2023. His murder, which resulted from an elaborate plot to seize his billion-dollar property holdings, received widespread media attention and public interest.

== Life and career ==
Mehrdad New York gained recognition in the 2000s with songs including "Miyoun In Hame Khoshgel Kio Entekhab Konam" (Who Should I Choose Among All These Beautiful People). The song became popular among music fans for its humorous tone and catchy rhythm.

Beyond his music career, he owned significant real estate holdings in Iran, estimated to be worth over 4 trillion tomans (approximately $80 million USD at the time). In his final years, Mehrdad decided to travel to Iran to manage his assets. Due to his desire to have a large family and transfer his wealth to his children, he utilized surrogacy arrangements. He contracted with three Iranian women to carry his children, a decision that made him a controversial figure in the community.

== Murder ==
=== Disappearance ===
In November 2024, Mehrdad's son in America contacted relatives in Iran expressing concern about his father's absence.

=== Details of the crime ===
According to the suspects' confessions, a young notary public along with the caretaker of Mehrdad's villa in Tehran's Yousefabad district orchestrated his murder. They hired two hitmen, one of whom was Mehrdad's advertising manager. The perpetrators first kidnapped him using anesthetic drugs at his villa in northern Iran and transferred him to Tehran. He was held captive for 10 days and tortured until he transferred his property deeds to the notary. After securing the assets, the perpetrators murdered him, dismembered his body, and burned it in the desert areas around Damavand.

=== Discovery ===
The investigation began after Mehrdad's disappearance. Complaints from three surrogacy contract holders who hadn't received their payments, along with a complaint from his nephew through his friend and former judiciary judge Vahed Sharifi Nahavandi, provided initial leads. The discovery of suspicious property transfers to a notary in western Tehran accelerated the investigation.

Police tracked phone calls and financial transactions between the notary and caretaker, leading to the identification and arrest of all suspects. The hired killers confessed to burning the body and disposing of orthopedic plates with serial numbers that had been implanted during Mehrdad's accident in America to prevent identification.

=== Motive ===
Investigations revealed that the primary motive was financial gain to acquire his assets. The suspects forced him to transfer property documents worth approximately 4 trillion tomans before killing him.

=== Recovery of remains ===
After the perpetrators' confessions, Mehrdad's burned remains were discovered at a villa in Damavand. Police arrested five individuals involved in the crime.

=== Suspects ===
Four suspects were arrested:

- A notary public involved in illegal property transfers
- The caretaker of Mehrdad's villa who helped plan the crime
- Two hired killers directly involved in the murder and body disposal

The suspects confessed after their arrest. Mehrdad's remains were sent to forensics for examination and identification.

=== Investigation ===
Tehran police used evidence from CCTV cameras and telecommunications tracking to identify and arrest all suspects. The case remains under judicial investigation.

=== Social and legal impact ===
This case exposed weaknesses in Iran's property registration and legal transaction oversight systems, sparking discussions about organized crime and the role of greed in human tragedies. The arrests and confessions helped clarify the case details, but the crime deeply affected public opinion.

Mehrdad New York's fans and the artistic community remember him as a good person and an artist, viewing this incident as a tragic end to an artist's life.
