= Pupils Association News Agency =

Iranian News Agency

Pupils Association News Agency (PANA) is the Iranian student news agency. It was opened by agreement between the Student Organization and the managing director of Islamic Republic News Agency and confirmed by the Minister of Education and Minister of Islamic Culture in June 2002. These actions were supported by Ayatollah Khamenei. Its Education service (Iranian School Information” PAMA”) the latest news about schools in Iran and offers journalists, writers and critics to the Iranian media. Now, Ardeshir Dehghani is the Manager of PANA.

== Education ==
PANA began its activities in summer 2003.

== Organization ==
PANA is a subset of the Ministry of Education. The central office is at number 2, Kousha Street, down Ershad mosque, Dr Shariati Street, Tehran.

== Honorary members ==
PANA's honorary members include officials of the Islamic Republic of Iran, such as Mahmoud Ahmadinejad.
