= Mehr News Agency =

Iranian news agency

- Website type: Broadcast newspaper online and mobile
- Available in: Arabic, English, Persian, Kurdish, Turkish, Urdu
- Founded: 22 June 2003; 23 years ago
- Headquarters: Tehran, Iran
- Area served: Worldwide
- Owner: Islamic Development Organization
- CEO: Mohammad Mahdi Rahmati (since April 2023); Mohammad Shojaeian (from September 2019 to April 2023); Ali Asgari (from April 2014 to September 2019); Reza Moghadasi (from October 2010 to April 2014); Parviz Esmaeili (from July 2003 to October 2010)
- Industry: News agency
- Website: www.mehrnews.com

The Mehr News Agency (MNA; Persian: خبرگزاری مهر, romanized: Xabâr-gozâri Mehr) is a semi-official news agency sponsored by the government of Iran. It is headquartered in Tehran, and is owned by the Iranian government's Islamic Development Organization (IIDO). Mehr publishes all content on its website under the Creative Commons Attribution 4.0 International license.

== History and profile ==
Established on 22 June 2003, MNA is the most multilingual (transmitting news and photos in six languages) news agency in the Islamic Republic of Iran. The first CEO and Director General was Parviz Esmaeili, and its current CEO and Director General is Mohammad Mahdi Rahmati. The director of the agency is selected by the Supreme Leader of Iran.

MNA includes coverage in the following areas:

- Art (cinema, theater, music, visual arts)
- Culture and literature (poetry, stories, books)
- Religion and thought
- Seminary and university
- Modern Technology
- Social
- Economy
- Political
- International
- Sports
- Magazines
- Photos
- Provinces

MNA has five regional centers inside the country—northern, southern, central, eastern, and western Iran.

It has also stringers and correspondents in Europe, South America, Turkey, East Asia, and some Persian Gulf littoral states and Commonwealth of Independent States for the time–being and is extending them across the world.

It transmits news and photos in six languages of Persian, English, Arabic, Turkish, Urdu and Kurdish.

Employing more than 300 reporters and photographers dispatched in 30 provinces of the country, MNA provides the widest news coverage in Iran.

== International cooperation ==
The news agency was accepted as the 40th member of the Organization of Asia-Pacific News Agencies (OANA) at the 13th General Assembly held in Jakarta, Indonesia, in 2007. The agency was the host agency of the OANA 31st Executive Board Meeting (EBM) and the 25th Editorial-Technical Experts Group (ETEG) Meeting in 2009. It had also actively participated in two international summits – the 2009 World Media Summit in Beijing, China, and the 2010 OANA Summit Congress in Seoul, South Korea.

The agency was also a special guest of the III News Agencies’ World Congress (NAWC) in Argentina from 19 to 23 October 2010.

MNA also participated in the Istanbul OANA General Assembly in November 2010 and the OANA 26th ETEG - 32nd EBM meetings in Ulaanbaatar in June 2011.

According to the OANA Secretary's report to the Istanbul Assembly, MNA, which has become OANA member since 2007, ranked second among the OANA member agencies in number of news and photos published on the organization's website. MNA initiated the OANA flag, and the 50-year-old OANA adopted the flag.

== Criticism ==
In 2006, Mehr News Agency was described by the Anti-Defamation League as a "megaphone for notorious Holocaust deniers" because it had published interviews with Arthur Butz, Michael A. Hoffman II, Fredrick Toben, Paul Fromm, Mark Weber and Robert Faurisson.

== See also ==
- List of Iranian news agencies
- Media of Iran
