= Didban Iran =

Iranian news agency

Didban Iran دیدبان ایران
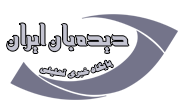
- Founded: 2015
- Founder: Saeid Seif
- Headquarters: Tehran, Iran
- Website: https://didbaniran.ir

Didban Iran (Persian: دیدبان ایران, lit. 'Watchman of Iran') is an independent, Persian-language, Tehran-based news website. It was founded in 2015 by Saeid Seif, who serves as its editor-in-chief.

In 2023 (1402 SH), Didban Iran ranked 13th among Iranian news agencies in an official evaluation by the Ministry of Culture and Islamic Guidance. Due to its bold exposés, some outlets have described Didban Iran as the "Iranian WikiLeaks".

== History and profile ==
Didban Iran was established in 2015 in Tehran by Saeid Seif. It operates under license number 79548 issued by the Ministry of Culture and Islamic Guidance. The agency covers political, social, cultural, economic, and sports issues.

== Official ranking ==
In 2023 (1402 SH), the Ministry of Culture and Islamic Guidance ranked Didban Iran 13th among all Iranian news websites.

== Filtering ==
- May 2024 (Ordibehesht 1403): The website was blocked for 22 days following reports on financial corruption involving the Debsh Tea company.
- March–April 2025 (Esfand 1403 – Ordibehesht 1404): The site was blocked for more than 40 days after publishing an interview with Mohsen Rafighdoost that contained revelations about extraterritorial assassinations.

== Arrests and security pressures ==
- December 2022 (Azar 1401): Founder Saeid Seif was arrested following coverage of nationwide protests.
- April 2023 (Farvardin 1402): He was detained again for allegedly supporting demonstrators.
- December 2024 (Azar 1403): Seif was arrested for two weeks after publishing interviews with Abbas Palizdar, Sardar Rostami, and others on corruption cases.

== Notable investigations ==
- Bank Refah (October 2024): Didban Iran reported the disappearance of €35 million at Refah Kargaran Bank. The General Inspection Organization launched an investigation, and eventually the court acquitted the media outlet.
- Tehran Municipality (March 2025): The outlet exposed a 17 trillion toman (170 trillion rial) budget discrepancy. After lawsuits by the municipality and city council, Didban Iran was acquitted due to its documentation.
- Electric bus contracts (2023–2024): Reports revealed irregularities in multi-billion dollar contracts with Chinese companies for importing electric buses and a "rubber-tire tramway". Members of Tehran’s city council criticized the project as opaque.
- Political assassinations (2025): In an interview, former IRGC commander Mohsen Rafighdoost admitted involvement in assassinations of opposition figures including Fereydoun Farrokhzad, Shahriar Shafiq, and Shapour Bakhtiar.
- Water mafia (September 2025): Former agriculture minister Issa Kalantari told Didban Iran about the role of contractors and consultancies in Iran’s so-called "water mafia".

== Media position ==
Due to its investigative reporting, some outlets and observers have called Didban Iran the "Iranian WikiLeaks".
