= Mazandaran University of Science and Technology =

- دانشگاه علوم و فنون مازندران; Danushgah-e 'lum-e vâ Fenvân-e Mazendâran
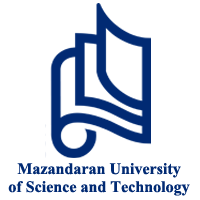
- Type: Private
- Established: 1992
- Chancellor: Dr.Seyyed Khallagh Mirnia
- Vice-Chancellor: Dr. Ali ghasemi Marzebali
- Location: Babol, Mazandaran, Iran
- Campus: Urban
- Nickname: MUST

Mazandaran University of Science and Technology (MUST) is a private university in Babol, Iran.

Mazandaran University of Science & Technology is a research university located in the city of Babol in the province of Mazandaran (Northern Iran) 15 km away from Caspian Sea. MUST was established in 1992 as the first private university in the country.

It offers degrees in Mechanical Engineering, Industrial Engineering, Computer Engineering, Information Technology, Electrical Engineering, Teaching English as a Foreign Language, Civil Engineering, Biomedical Engineering, Architecture, and other subjects, as well as MBA.

== Schools and Departments ==
- Industrial & Systems Engineering Department
- Computer Engineering and Information Technology Department
- Civil Engineering Department
- Business Department
- Mechanical Engineering Department
- Chemical Engineering Department
- Science Department
- Foreign Languages Department

== Industrial and Civil Engineering at MUST ==
Mazandaran University of Science & Technology is known for offering both Industrial and Civil Engineering programs including bachelor's degree, Master's degree and PhD degree in the nation.

== Cooperation ==
Master's degree and PhD courses are taught in English.
