= Maritime News Agency of Iran =

Iranian News Agency

Maritime News Agency
- Type: Broadcast newspaper online and mobile
- Country: Iran
- Founded: July 11, 2004; 20 years ago
- Headquarters: No 523, Aseman Tower, Shahid Lavasani, (Farmanieh), Junction, Pasdaran Ave, Tehran, Iran
- Area: Worldwide
- Owner: Marine and Ports Organization
- Official website: mana.ir/en

The Maritime News Agency (MANA) is a private news agency in Iran that launched in 2004. Its purpose is to cover a variety of marine, shipping, tourism and navy news along with other fields related to the industry.

== Profile ==
The website states it is the sole news wire service to cover marine news in the Iran.

== MANA English news ==
The English department of MANA is staffed with English and Persian dual language speakers. It provides readers with English versions of articles, news, photos, videos and analyses produced in the Persian department, but not necessarily every piece of the Persian products.
