= Student News Network =

Iranian news agency

Student News Network (SNN)
- Student News Agency logo
- Abbreviation: SNN
- Formation: 2003; 23 years ago
- Type: News agency
- Headquarters: Tehran
- Location: Iran
- Official language: Persian
- Managing Director: Hossein Farzandi
- Editor in Chief: Arash Barari
- Website: snn.ir (in Persian)

Student News Network (SNN) (Persian: خبرگزاری دانشجو) is an Iranian official news agency known for publishing university and student news.

== History ==
Student News Agency was founded in 2003 by Hadi Ghasemi. Ghasemi was CEO of SNN until April 2024, when Hossein Farzani was appointed. SNN is organizationally affiliated to the Student Basij, with its members working as reporters.

SNN's name in early years of its activity was "Student News Network"; after receiving its official news agency license from Ministry of Culture and Islamic Guidance, it was renamed to "Student News Agency". In 2021, SNN launched the first news web TV. In 2023 the international branch of SNN was founded.

== Services ==
Besides university and students news, SNN also produces and publishes content related to a variety of subjects, including:

- SNN Tv
- Science and Technology
- Provinces
- Politics
- Economics
- Culture
- Social
- Sports
- Photo
- Multimedia
- Graphic and Caricature

All of SNN's content is free content and Creative Commons licensed.

== Controversial works ==
Student News Agency has been one of the most active and marginalized media in the field of news and has caused controversial events in each of the governments of the Islamic Republic of Iran.

=== Doctor Salam ===
The most marginal product of SNN is the political satire series "Doctor Salam", which deals with the current affairs of the society, criticizes the actions of government officials and has always been criticized by them. Every year, the anniversary of the launch of this product is held by Student News Agency, and thousands of enthusiasts and fans of this comic collection participate in places such as the 7th of Tir Martyrs' Stadium and other places.

The celebration has always been accompanied by various fringes. Among them is Dr. Salam's five-year birthday party, which was scheduled to take place at Azadi Indoor Stadium. However, with several sabotages by the officials of the Ministry of Ershad, the license to hold the program at Azadi Stadium was revoked and it was held at the Imam Ali Stadium of the Islamic Azad University.

So far, more than 180 episodes of this collection of socio-political satire have been produced and presented through the Student News Agency website.

=== Press exhibition ===
Every year, Student News Agency participates in press and news agency exhibitions, and its presence in this exhibition has always been accompanied by various news and margins.

For example, the presence of this news agency in the 2015 Press Exhibition was accompanied by various controversies. In this exhibition, the booth of Student News Agency had become one of the most newsworthy topics. To protest the policies of the exhibition, the agency's officials closed the exhibition by pulling purple ribbons around the booth and refusing to attend the exhibition.

== Key people ==
- Ex-CEO: Hadi Ghasemi
- Editor-in-Chief: Arash Barari
- Economic Editor: Mohammad Najjarsadeghi
- International Editor: Ali Safari
- Culture Editor: Seyed Reza Mirjafari

== See also ==
- List of Iranian news agencies
- Media of Iran
