= Entekhab =

Daily newspaper in Iran

- Type: Daily
- Founder: Mohammad Mahdi Faghihi
- Editor-in-chief: Mostafa Faghihi
- Founded: 1991
- Political alignment: Moderate / Reformist
- Language: Persian
- Headquarters: Tehran, Iran
- Website: Official website

Entekhab (Persian: انتخاب, lit. 'Choice') was a Persian-language newspaper published in Tehran, Iran between 1991 and 2004. Nevertheless, its news website is active under the name of "Entekhab" (Entekhab.ir) and has become one of the most visited news websites in Iran, close to reformists.

The Iranian Supreme National Security Council and the Ministry of Islamic Culture and Guidance shut down Entekhab from July to October 2023 over a video post criticizing Iran's foreign deals with China and Russia as failures. The video, titled Auction of the Iranian Brand: Why is Iranian Foreign Policy So Weak?, led to the website's confiscation. Despite a judge's order to release the site, the government refused to comply for weeks.

== History ==
Entekhab was founded by Mohammad Mahdi Faghihi, who was previously the founder of the respected philosophical quarterly, Naghd va Nazar. The daily had a moderate stance and its editorials were mostly educated in Qom's seminary, but their new insights on Entekhab shook the political scene in Iran during the late 1990s.

Khamenei ordered the paper to close down shortly after its founding. Although it was reopened later, the paper was banned in 2004.

The paper still operates an online version and it is one of the most popular news websites in Iran, with a focus on foreign policy and domestic affairs. Entekhab is among the reformist news outlets in favour of restoring ties with the US and simultaneously enhancing relationships with China.

In 2009 presidential election, Entekhab was one of the leading pro-Mousavi news websites, leading to its closure for more than eight months following the massive protests occurring over the disputed results of the race.

Criticizing the government's approach, Entekhab, which is managed by Mostafa Faghihi, a senior media adviser to the late Akbar Hashemi Rafsanjani, has been banned for more than 16 times by the governments of hardline Mahmoud Ahmadinejad and moderate Hassan Rouhani. The news website, however, has managed to survive and gain much influence in Iranian politics.

As its chief editor, Mostafa Faghihi has repeatedly faced charges and sentenced to prison. He was lately found guilty for "insulting the Supreme Leader", and was also summoned to the court over his scoop and breaking the news about the real number of deaths from coronavirus in Iran.

َAkbar Hashemi Rafsanjani, Iran's two time president, praised Entekhab for its performance, saying the outlet has succeeded in "attracting many audience and achieving a desirable level of influence."

== See also ==
- List of newspapers in Iran
