= Tebyan Cultural Institute =

Cultural and educational organization in Iran

Cultural and Informational Institute of Tabiban مؤسسه فرهنگی و اطلاع‌رسانی تبیان
- Established: 2002
- Focus: cultural and educational
- Endowment: commercial
- Location: Tehran
- Website: tebyan.net

Tebyan Cultural Institute is a cultural and educational organization.

== History ==
The Tebyan Cultural Institute was founded in 2002 in Iran. Its Alexa internet ranking is 15 in Iran.

== Activities ==
- Publication of cultural information on the web.
- Supporting cultural products in information technology.
- Publication of free of charge information on Tebyan's website.
- Providing consultation in religious issues.

The Tebyan cultural institute, which is affiliated to the organization "Sazman-e Tablighat-e Eslami", is one of the biggest and best known cultural institutes in Iran, and has cooperated with other cultural institutes in different fields for supporting cultural festivals and broadcasting their activities in the media.

The activities of the institute's take place not only in Tehran, but also in the provincial centers, and 1,600,000 users visit its website each day.

The Iranian deputy minister supported its activities for sport and youth on the website tebyan.net in Tehran.

The new site of the Tebyan Cultural Institute is called hamsan.tebyan.net and is run by the Islamic Development Organisation.
