= Baztab =

Iranian News Website

Baztab (Persian: بازتاب meaning reflection) is an Iranian, Persian language, Tehran-based news website. The English service of the site has been published since January 2007. Although Baztab is an anti-reformist website, it sometimes criticized Mahmoud Ahmadinejad's government's policies and unveiled corruption cases inside the government. Baztab is widely believed to have close ties with (or be managed by) Mohsen Rezaee, a conservative politician.

Baztab was filtered and suspended for a few weeks in October 2005 for allegedly insulting the former secretary of the Supreme National Security Council, Hassan Rouhani. Baztab's suspension was rescinded after the site's editor, Foad Sadeghi, stepped down.

In February 2007, the website was banned and filtered in Iran for the second time. In September 2007, a court in Tehran ordered the website to be shut down indefinitely for threatening the national security of Iran by "exaggerating the foreign threat to Iran and the possibility of war." In the same month, members of Baztab started the Tabnak news website, following the same policies as Baztab.

Baztab came back online in 2011 with the key people of the first version and a minor change in the domain's address. It was then blocked by the Iranian authorities again and attacked by pro-government hackers.

== See also ==
- Media of Iran
