= Iran Pro Sport News Agency =

Iranian News Agency

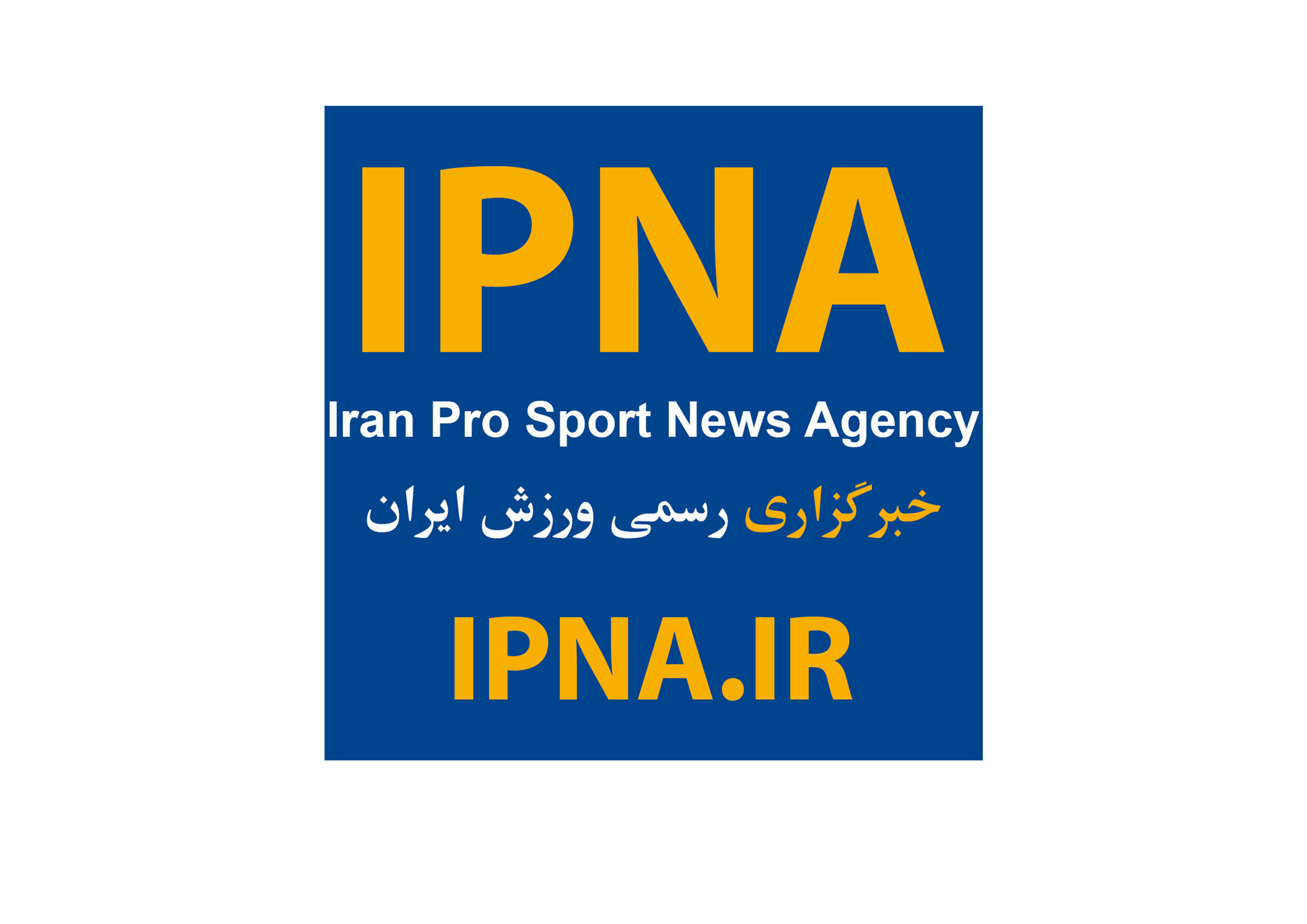
IPNA logo

Iran Pro Sport News Agency (IPNA) is the national sports news agency of the Islamic Republic of Iran.
