= Asia (economic newspaper) =

Iranian economic news website

Asia (Economic Newspaper)
- Type: Economic Newspaper
- Founder: Iraj Jamshidi
- Editor-in-chief: Iraj Jamshidi
- Founded: June 15, 2001; 24 years ago
- Language: Persian
- Country: Iran
- Website: asianews.ir

Asia News (Persian: روزنامه اقتصادی آسیا) is a non-governmental Iranian economic news website and newspaper.

== Seizure of Asia news ==
Asia was established in 2001 by Iraj Jamshidi. In twenty years of activity, the newspaper was closed twice due to non-compliance with government laws. The newspaper is now in its third edition.
