= Farheekhtegan =

Iranian newspaper

- Type: Daily newspaper - Online
- Format: Broadsheet
- Owner: Islamic Azad University
- Editor-in-chief: Ali Khezrian
- Editor: Mohammad Amin Imanjani
- Founded: 20 May 2009
- Language: Persian
- Headquarters: Tehran
- Price: 20,000 IR 30,000 IR (Tehran only)
- ISSN: 2008-4765
- Website: farhikhtegandaily.com

Farheekhtegan (Persian: فرهیختگان, "Intellectuals"; Persian pronunciation: [færhĭxtûˈgŭn]) is a national Iranian Persian-language newspaper. With ISSN 2008-4765 and OCLC Number 433127552, the newspaper is focused on academic, cultural, political, social, economic and sports news.

== History ==
Farheekhtegan was first published in April 1993 as a weekly magazine, mainly covering the news around the Islamic Azad University. On 20 May 2009, Farheekhtegan, then evolved to a daily newspaper, came out to the kiosks around Iran for the first time. The newspaper continued daily publication in Persian language since then and occasionally was also published in English.

== Circulation ==
In addition to the typical Iranian distribution system of written materials through the kiosks and libraries in Tehran and other major cities, Farheekhtegan also enjoys a dedicated circulation system among Islamic Azad University branches around the country.

== See also ==
- Hamshahri
- Media of Iran
