= Media, War & Conflict =

- Discipline: International relations, media studies
- Language: English
- Edited by: Sarah Maltby, Ben O'Loughlin, Katy Parry, Laura Roselle

Publication details
- History: 2008-present
- Publisher: SAGE Publications
- Frequency: Quarterly

Standard abbreviations
- ISO 4: Media War Confl.

Indexing
- ISSN: 1750-6352
- OCLC no.: 643111977

Links
- Journal homepage; Online access; Online archive

Media, War & Conflict is a peer-reviewed academic journal that covers the intersection of international relations and media studies. The journal publishes four issues per year. The editors-in-chief are Sarah Maltby (University of Sussex), Ben O'Loughlin (Royal Holloway University), Katy Parry (University of Leeds), and Laura Roselle (Elon University). It was established in 2008 and is published by SAGE Publications.

== Abstracting and indexing ==
Journal indexing and metrics can be found on the SAGE website: https://journals.sagepub.com/metrics/MWC
