= Mohammad-Hossein Khoshvaght =

Iranian politician

Mohammad-Hossein Khoshvaght (Persian: محمدحسین خوشوقت) was head of the press and foreign journalists department at Iran's Ministry of Culture and Islamic Guidance, under reformist President Mohammad Khatami.

== Background ==
A relative by marriage to Supreme Leader Ayatollah Ali Khamenei, he is a former Rome bureau chief of the Islamic Republic News Agency, fluent in Italian and English. He came into news during the alleged murder of Iranian-Canadian photojournalist Zahra Kazemi by official security forces, as he claimed he was repeatedly forced by Saeed Mortazavi to declare false information to obstruct the investigation into Kazemi’s death.
