= Aliasghar Honarmand =

Aliasghar Honarmand is an Iranian journalist. He is the founder of the gadget news website Narenji.

He is currently serving an 11-year jail sentence in Iran, having been arrested in December 2013 and tried by the Iranian government, allegedly for espionage against the state. More than a dozen members of the Narenji team were arrested alongside Honarmand. Some remain in jail, serving sentences of between two and seven years. Their arrest was televised by Iranian state TV.

They were accused of trying to orchestrate a '...soft overthrow' of the Iranian regime", having attended training courses hosted by the BBC. The Iranian state has been known to suspect the BBC of being a tool for UK espionage in the region, a claim the BBC denies. Honarmand unsuccessfully appealed his sentence in 2015.
