= Islamic Development Organization =

Propaganda arm of Iranian government

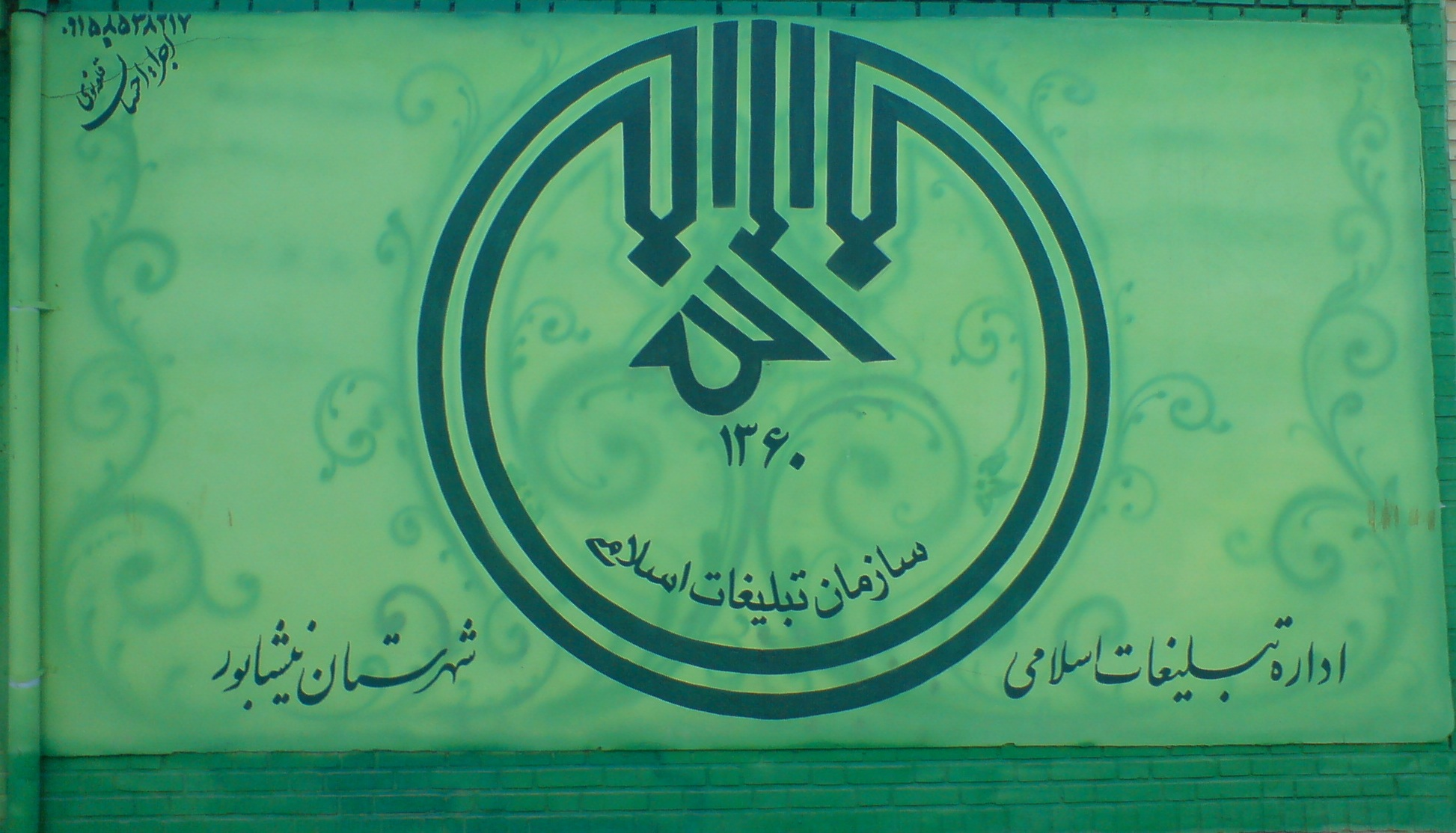
- Formation: 1982; 44 years ago
- Website: ido.ir

The Islamic Development Organization (Persian: سازمان تبلیغات اسلامی), also known as the Islamic Ideology Dissemination Organization (IIDO), or the Islamic Propagation Organization is an Iranian religious and cultural organization. It was created by Rouhollah Khomeini after the 1979 Revolution in Iran, and is under the supervision of the Supreme Leader. This organization was originally created in the summer of 1982 to promote the ideologies of the Islamic Republic.

== History ==
The organization was formed after the revolution based on the decree of the 1st Supreme Leader, Ruhollah Khomeini in 1981. The organization is an independent legal entity managed by the supreme leader of Iran.

== Name ==
The initial name of the organization was "The Institution of Islamic Development Council" (Persian: نهاد شورای عالی تبلیغات اسلامی). This was later changed to "Islamic Development Organization" on 3 April 1989.

== Chiefs ==
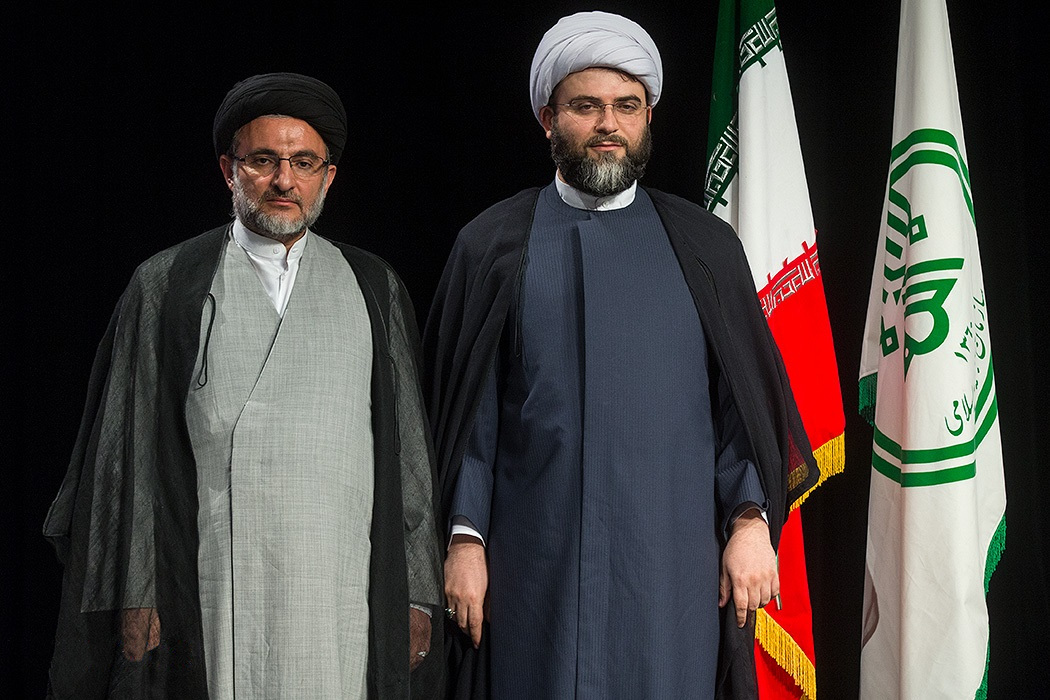
Farewell ceremonies for the previous chief of the organization (left), and the referral of "Mohammad Qomi" (right)

Ahmad Jannati was the organization's first head. He was succeeded by Mahmoud Mohammadi Araghi for ten years, followed by Seyyed Mahdi Khamoushi and Mohammad Qomi.

== Objectives ==
The objectives of the organization include:

- Revive and promote Islam in all needed fields, and develop Islamic ethics among people, particularly youth.
- Defend the principles of Islam, the Islamic republic system, and the Islamic revolution aims.
- Quantitative and qualitative development of religious promotion.

== Dependent organizations ==
- Amirkabir (publisher)
- Darol-Quran al-Karim Organization
- Ketab Shahr Company
- Mehr News Agency - News agency in Iran sponsored by the Iranian government.
- ON News Media
- Organization of Islamic Education Schools
- Research Institute for Islamic Promotion and Studies, Baqir al-Uloom
- Soureh International University
- Tebyan Cultural Institute
- Tehran Times - English-language newspaper based in Iran
- The Artistic Sect

== Duties ==
21 duties were approved by the board of trustees, including:

- Policy making, planning, guidance, organizing, supporting, and supervising public religious promotion.
- Revival and development of Shia education, culture and history.
- Surveying "misleading advertising," and "cultural invasion" from political opponents.
- Co-operation within ministries, governmental organizations (and other related institutions) in order to develop Islamic education and culture.
- Founding of information centers in specialty, promotion and religious fields.

== See also ==
- Housing Foundation of Islamic Revolution
- Islamic Culture and Communication Organization
- Islamic Development Coordination Council
- Office of Literature and Art of Resistance
