= Mostafa Faghihi =

Iranian journalist

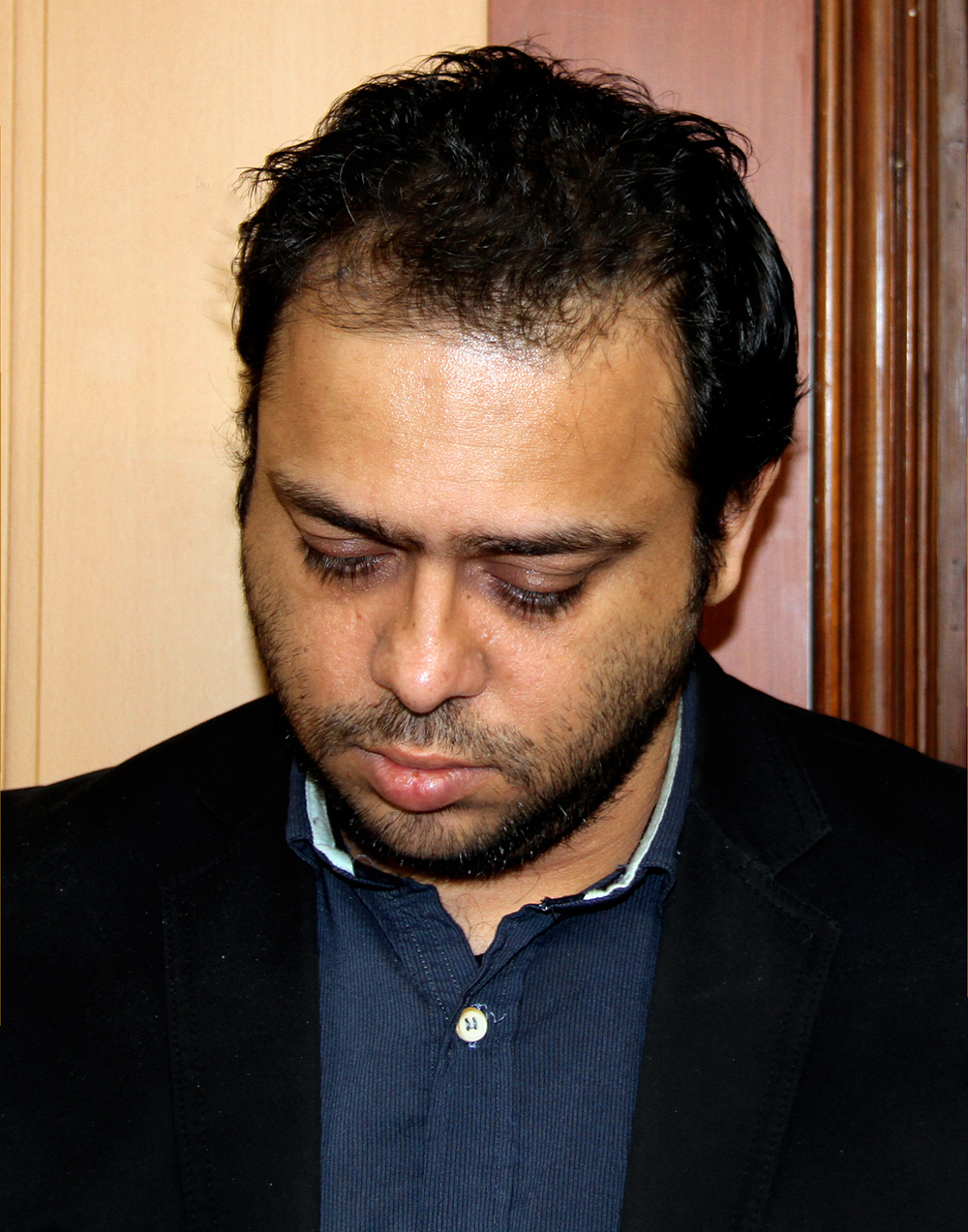
- Born: 1986 (age 39–40); Qom, Iran
- Occupation: journalist
- Political party: Iranian Reformists

Mostafa Faghihi (Persian: مصطفی فقیهی; born 1986) is an Iranian reformist journalist. He has also been the former editor-in-chief and current owner of Entekhab daily newspaper and media consultant to Akbar Hashemi Rafsanjani. He has been summoned to Iranian courts several times on charges of insulting the Supreme Leader and President of Iran, criticizing Iranian military and security officials, and spreading lies by the prosecutor, the Ministry of Intelligence, and the Revolutionary Guards. Due to some of his revelations, Faqihi has been covered by the Iranian and international media.

== Revelations ==
Some of his revelations are:

Some of his revelations are Mostafa Faghihi was the first to say that Hassan Rouhani was building a house on land that did not have a legal permit. After this revelation, the chairman of the Islamic City Council of Tehran confirmed Faghihi's words. Twenty-four hours after the news broke, the third floor of President Rouhani's house was demolished.

When Iranian government officials put the death toll at 176, Faghihi announced that 2,000 Iranians have died from the coronavirus. But some Iranian media outlets believed the news was a lie and called for his trial. Some media outlets, such as Radio Farda, also said that Faghihi had been arrested by the Iranian judiciary. But a few days later, he denied his detention, saying that he had only been summoned by the court and that he had given explanations.

Mostafa Faghihi published documents in which a member of the Islamic Consultative Assembly of Iran forged his degree. A few days later, the spokesman of the Guardian Council confirmed Faghihi 's words and annulled the votes of the parliamentary candidate.

== Threat of murder ==
Referring to the criticism of Iranian politicians in the news media, he was threatened with murder by the daughter of one of them.
