= Tabnak =

Iranian state media outlet

- Type: News agency
- Founded: 2007
- Headquarters: Iran
- Key people: Amir Ali Amiri (founder)
- Website: tabnak.ir

Tabnak (Persian: تابناک) is an Iranian news website affiliated with Mohsen Rezaee, a senior national politician and former Islamic Revolutionary Guard Corps commander.

== History and management ==
Tabnak was founded in 2007 by Amir Ali Amiri, a close associate of Mohsen Rezaee, as a successor to the banned Baztab website. Rezaee is believed to own the outlet, and several of his associates and relatives hold prominent roles within the organization. The website receives state funding and is often described as semiofficial.

== Content ==
As of 2020, Tabnak was the most visited news website in Iran. Its editorial line is categorized as conservative or right-wing. Tehran Bureau has described Tabnak as existing "primarily to advance the private interests" of Rezaee.
