= Asr-e Azadegan =

Daily newspaper in Iran

- Type: Daily newspaper
- Founder: Hamidreza Jalaipour
- Editor-in-chief: Mashallah Shamsolvaezin
- Managing editor: Ghafour Garshasbi
- Founded: 7 October 1999
- Ceased publication: April 2000
- Political alignment: Reformist
- Language: Persian
- Headquarters: Tehran

Asr-e Azadegan (Persian: عصر آزادگان, lit. 'Times of the Free People') was a Persian-language daily newspaper in Iran published briefly between 1999 and 2000.

== History and profile ==
Asr-e Azadegan was established on 7 October 1999. The founder and publisher of the daily was Hamid Reza Jalaipour who also launched Jameah, Toos and Neshat; all of which had been closed down before the launching of Asr-e Azadegan. However, the existence of Asr-e Azadegan lasted very brief and it was banned in April 2000 for publishing articles which "disparaged Islam and the religious elements of the Islamic revolution."

The paper was edited by Mashallah Shamsolvaezin. The manager editor was Ghafour Garshasbi who was acquitted of publishing articles that violated the Iranian press law in October 2000.

The newspaper's editors included:

- Akbar Ganji, who wrote about Iranian secret services.
- Ebrahim Nabavi, who wrote a daily political satire.
- Hossein Derakhshan, who wrote a regular technology column.
- Massoud Behnoud, who wrote a regular opinion column.

== See also ==
- List of newspapers in Iran
