= Jalaeipour =

Jalaeipour (Persian: جلایی‌پور) may refer to:

- Hamidreza Jalaeipour (born 1957), Iranian sociologist and professor at the University of Tehran
- Mohammadreza Jalaeipour (born 1982), Iranian sociologist and political activist (the son of Hamidreza Jalaeipour)
