= Dick Davis (translator) =

British poet and translator

- Born: 18 April 1945 (age 81); Portsmouth, Hampshire, England
- Citizenship: British
- Education: University of Manchester (PhD)
- Occupations: Scientist, writer
- Employer: Ohio State University

Richard (Dick) Davis (born 1945) is an English–American Iranologist, poet, university professor and award-winning translator of Persian verse, who is affiliated with the literary movement known as New Formalism in American poetry.

Born into a working-class family shortly before the end of World War II, Davis grew up in the Yorkshire fishing village of Withernsea during the 1950s, where an experimental school made it possible for Davis to become the first member of his family to attend university. Shortly before graduating from Cambridge University, Davis was left heartbroken by the suicide of his schizophrenic brother and decided to begin living and teaching abroad. After teaching in Greece and Italy, in 1970 Davis decided to live permanently in Tehran during the reign of the last Shah. As a result, he taught English at the University of Tehran, and married Afkham Darbandi, about whom he has since written and published many love poems, in 1974. After the Islamic Revolution, Dick and Afkham Davis fled to the United Kingdom and then moved to the United States, Davis began translating many of the greatest masterpieces of both ancient and modern Persian poetry into English.

Davis is a Fellow of the Royal Society of Literature, and has been called, by The Times Literary Supplement, "our finest translator from Persian." Davis' original poetry has been just as highly praised. Davis' poetry collections have been chosen as books of the year by The Sunday Times (UK) in 1989; The Daily Telegraph (UK) in 1989; The Economist (UK) in 2002; The Washington Post in 2010, and The Times Literary Supplement (UK) in 2013.

== Early life ==
Davis was born on 18 April 1945 in Portsmouth, Hampshire, England, but grew up in Withernsea, Yorkshire. He never knew his biological father, who left when Davis was two years old. His mother remarried soon afterwards and, even though his mother and stepfather were working-class people with very little education, they both read voraciously. Davis later recalled, "...there were many books around the house, and I was expected to read them like everyone else."

He later recalled, "Portsmouth is a big naval town with a large sailor population. It's a noisy, busy, and dirty place. Our Yorkshire home was in a small village by the sea. In the past, it had been primarily a fishing village, but that was winding down when I was a child, although the boats still went out in the morning to fish in the North Sea. But mainly the village was dependent on summer tourism. Yet I can still remember that whenever there were storms at sea, there was a particular hymn we always sang in school because the fathers of some of the boys still went out in their fishing boats. The hymn was O, Hear Us When We Cry to Thee, For Those in Peril on the Sea, and, to this day, I still can't hear that hymn without a lump in my throat."

Davis has said that he was very influenced by his stepfather, who had a passionate love of reading about world history. He added, "My stepfather, in many ways, is a very noble man, and he always was. He served in the Second World War and he was highly decorated for bravery. He never talked about it, but I'm certain he killed people in combat and felt quite terrible about it. When I was a very young boy, I remember him bringing a German guest into the home. In those days, it was a terrible thing to do in a little village. Naturally, the Germans had a terrible reputation in England during the 1950s. But he didn't care. He wanted to show his hospitality. A few years later, when I was about eight or nine, we had a West Indian staying in our house, and he was the first black person to ever appear in the village. My stepfather had befriended the young man in London, and he'd always had this belief that nation's shouldn't be isolated from each other."

Davis further recalls, "I was lucky because they decided to set up an experimental school, which they called a comprehensive school, which is quite similar to public schools in the U.S. Previously in England, when you went to a state school, you were divided into two groups at the age of eleven: those who went to grammar school and those who didn't. But, back then, they were considering allowing everyone to go to the same school, and our little rural community was chosen as a pilot area. Since this was unique and experimental at the time, it attracted some very dedicated and excellent teachers who moved to Withernsea. So even though I lived in a very small and isolated village, I had some extremely good teachers, and because of them I was able to go to Cambridge. I came from a family where nobody had ever been to University, let alone Cambridge, and I believe that if I'd gone to a regular state school and didn't have all those dedicated teachers, I probably wouldn't have made it."

Davis has credited the English master at the Withernsea school, John Gibson, with instilling in him a love of poetry. Davis adds that by the time he "went up to Cambridge," he had, "pretty well read the entire canon of English poetry." Gibson once urged Davis to read John Milton's Paradise Lost over summer break. Another summer, Davis was urged to read William Wordsworth's The Prelude.

Davis has also said, "As an adolescent, one of my favorite books was Fitzgerald's Rubaiyat, which, as you know, is a very romanticized version of Iran. Fitzgerald had himself never visited Iran and, as a matter of fact, he never got as further east than Paris. So his translation presents a kind of imaginative vision of Iran, one which I found very attractive."

Davis has said that his favorite poets during school were William Blake, D.H. Lawrence, and American poet Emily Dickinson. He commented, "Somehow I discovered Dickinson, which was strange back then because American poetry was never taught in English schools. But somehow I got ahold of her poems, and I loved them and imitated them. I loved the epigrammatic aspect of her work – poems that were short, sharp, and to the point, and I thought to myself: 'That's the kind of poetry I want to write.'"

== Cambridge ==
Davis attended King's College, Cambridge, where he was introduced to Persian and Indian literature through his friendship with E.M. Forster and to San Francisco LGBT poet Thom Gunn.

When asked if he had ever attempted to write free verse, Davis replied, "I tried it for a very short time, less than a year, when I was about eighteen. Back then, it seemed to be what people were doing, and what you were supposed to do. But I very quickly realized that I wasn't interested in writing free verse. I think it was Raymond Chandler who once said you should write the kind of novels that you'd like to read, and I'd never particularly enjoyed reading free verse. I read it dutifully, of course. I read Gunn's free verse because I admired Gunn so much, and I read a lot of the American free verse poets, but I never wanted to do it myself."

Davis also recalled, however,

My brother committed suicide when he was nineteen and I was twenty-one. We had the kind of relationship that brothers often have; we were very close, but we also had a strong rivalry. He was a very unhappy child, and he was diagnosed as being mentally unstable – as a schizophrenic – and he spent a lot of his adolescence in and out of institutions... my years at Cambridge were shadowed by my brother since he was often ill. He also had very bad relations with my parents, and they'd effectively turned over his care to me. So I spent a lot of time seeing him into institutions, although he would often run away. It was a very strange experience for both of us and I took his death very hard. For a long time, I couldn't deal with it and, to be honest, it's the reason that I left England. He died shortly before I graduated from Cambridge, and as soon as I graduated, I said, 'I have to get away from here.'

== Inside the Shah's Iran ==
According to Davis, "I left Cambridge in my early twenties, and I taught first in Greece and then in Italy, but I was feeling the urge to go somewhere outside of Europe, and a friend of mine who'd been working as an archaeologist in Iran said it was a wonderful country and that he was planning to teach there for a while. So he said, 'Why don't you come, too? We can share an apartment.' So that's what I did. I got a job teaching English at Tehran University on a two year contract. During that time, I fell in love with the woman I'd eventually marry, so when the two year contract ended, I looked for another job so I could stay in Iran and be near her and get married."

Of his relationship with his wife Afkham Darbandi Davis has said, "There were, of course problems because her parents were very much against it. It was the usual concerns, marrying a foreigner, we don't know who he is and all of that. So I stayed in Iran for two more years, and we were married in 1974."

After their wedding in Tehran, the Davises had their honeymoon in Cochin, India, which Davis has since memorialized in the love poem, Memories of Cochin.

When asked about the many other love poems addressed to his wife, Davis replied, "It's often occurred to me that there are so few poems that celebrate love within a marriage. It's been suggested that Petrarch would never have written all his sonnets to Laura if he'd slept with her. But marriage exists all over the world, and it's very real for many people. It's not some fantasy or illusion, and it's something I've always wanted to write about. As for my children, they're immensely important to me. You certainly don't want to burden them with your emotions; but, on the other hand, the emotions are still there, and I've tried to write about it. I must admit that I find those poems very hard to write, much more difficult than writing poems about my wife."

When asked whether he and Afkham were ever at risk during the Islamic Revolution and the fall of the Pahlavi dynasty, Davis said, "There was certainly danger out there, of course, but I never felt specifically in danger because I was a Westerner. In fact, my students would often try to protect me, saying, 'There's going to be a big demonstration downtown, and it's going to be at such-and-such a time and such-and-such a place, so don't go down there. Or, if I wanted to go out of curiosity, they'd say, 'If you really need to go, then we'll go along and make sure you're okay.' The people who experienced the real hostility in Tehran were the people associated with Western Governments. As for the rest of us, Iranians would often say things like, 'Tell people in your country what's happening here. The world should know.' So I personally never had any problems, but my wife and I did have an apartment on a main road where there were many demonstrations, and sometimes there was shooting going on. We lived on the third floor, with large plate-glass windows, and we could look out and see the tanks outside, and that didn't feel too good. At the time, we had a couple of friends who were Indians who lived on a back street, and they said, 'Why don't you come and stay with us until all this quiets down?' So we moved in with them for about three weeks, but it soon became clear that it wasn't going to quiet down in the foreseeable future, so we made arrangements to leave the country."

The Davises left Iran for the United Kingdom in November 1978.

== Life as refugees ==
After arrived in the United Kingdom, Davis began writing and publishing poetry of his own. In a 1980 book review, American poet and literary critic Dana Gioia commented, "Reading Dick Davis' new book Seeing the World, confirms my impression that he is one of the two or three best young poets now writing in England. With only two thin books to his credit, Davis is already a fully realized poet. There is not mistaking one of his poems. More than any other English poet of his generation, Davis has created a distinctly personal voice, an accomplishment all the more impressive because he has chosen to work in a controlled, classical style. He never cultivates idiosyncrasies, and yet one can always recognize a Davis poem by the intensity of his imagination and the deceptive simplicity of his words. In an age when American and British English are drifting further apart, Davis is also remarkable in how fully his poems are audible to an American ear."

After also highly praising the epigrammatic quality which Davis had learned from the poetry of Emily Dickinson, Gioia concluded by writing, "This obsession to condense experience and language into tight, controlled forms is matched by Davis' need to establish a moral dimension in his poetry. Morality for him seems to be an organizing principle as important as meter or diction. In some ways all three principles may even be different sides of the same vision of poetry. Implicitly or explicitly in almost every piece poetry becomes a moral judgment of experience. Some readers will clearly resist a sensibility so certain of its mission, but a mind that can recreate and evaluate a scene in a few memorable lines deserves attention in this garrulous age."

Davis also made a translation with Afkham's assistance of Attar of Nishapur's The Conference of Birds, which was published in 1984. Since then, Davis has published literary translations of a collection of medieval Persian epigrams in 1997, Ferdowsi's The Shahnameh, Iran's national epic, in 2006, and Fakhruddin As'ad Gurgani's famous love story Vis and Ramin in 2009.

In 2012, Davis published Faces of Love: Hafez and the Poets of Shiraz. The book is a collection of verse by the poets of Medieval Shiraz, which was so secular and hedonistic compared to other cities in the Islamic World that Davis compares it with Venice. The collection includes many poetic laments written after the Royal House of Inju was overthrown in 1353 by warlord Mubariz al-Din Muhammad, an Islamic Fundamentalist, who imposed Sharia Law upon Shiraz, closed the wine shops, and forced the women of the city to wear the chador and be confined indoors unless escorted by a male relative. According to Davis, Mubariz was sarcastically dubbed "The Morals Officer," by the poets and people of Shiraz, who were overjoyed when Mubariz was ultimately overthrown and blinded by his son, Shah Shoja Mozaffari, who reversed his father's Islamic fundamentalist policies.

The three poets Davis translated for the collection are Hafez, "who's without question, the most famous lyric poet in Iranian history," Princess Jahan Malek Khatun, who, "is the only Medieval woman poet whose complete works have come down to us – well over a thousand poems," and Ubayd Zakani, "the most famous obscene poet from Medieval Iran."

In 2015, Davis published a collection of translated poems by Fatemeh Shams, an award-winning Iranian female poet and vocal critic of the government of the Islamic Republic of Iran. Shams, like the Davises, is currently living in exile in the United States.

According to literary critic Cynthia Haven, Davis first learned of Shams during a visit to Asghar Seyed-Gohrab, a fellow scholar of Persian literature, in Leiden, in The Netherlands. As Davis was ready to turn in for the night, Seyed-Gohrab urged him to read through a sheaf of poems by Fatemeh Shams. Davis did so and immediately was hooked. Davis later told Haven, "I usually read medieval Persian poetry, not modern poetry, and the idiom is different, so I had to read them slowly to be sure I was getting everything – even so I'm sure there were things I missed."

According to Haven, "Yet powerful affinities link The Shahnameh with the poems of this 21st century poet. The Persian Book of Kings echoes with a 'recurrent cry for justice against cruel or incompetent kings,' Dick writes in the introduction. Prison poems begin during the same era in Persia as well – Mas'ud Sa'd (1046–1121) starts the sad tradition, and it continues to this day. Political anger bubbles below the surface in Persian poetry throughout the last millennium. And so it does with Fatemeh Shams. 'It is an association that may at first sight seem counter-intuitive – the privacy of erotic passion allied with the public stance of political protest,' the translator writes, 'but the link is of course that both the passion and the politics are subversive of the status quo – of patriarchy that would deny women erotic autonomy, and of political authority that would deny them social freedom.'"

== Current status ==
Davis is professor emeritus of Persian at Ohio State University and previously a Bita Daryabari Professor of Persian Letters at Stanford University. He has received numerous academic and literary awards which have included the Ingram Merrill and Heinemann awards for poetry.

While interviewing Davis, William Baer mentioned the, "powerful spiritual resonance," in the former's poetry, as well as several of his poems, such as Maximilian Kolbe, Rembrandt's Return of the Prodigal Son, A Christmas Poem, and others, could be considered works of Christian poetry.

Davis replied, "Spirituality has always been very difficult for me, and I think I'm an Atheist. On the other hand, I'm very sympathetic to religious emotion. If I'd lived in the Middle Ages, I probably would have been a monk. I would have been a very bad monk because I would have been tormented by lots of non-monkish desires. But I'm very drawn to spirituality, and I'm very drawn to those people who live a truly spiritual life. Having said that, I'm often very revolted by the way in which most religions are actually practiced in the world. I've lived in the Middle East, and I've seen the damage that religious sectarianism can do. I'm not picking on any particular religion, but I feel, overall, that they often do more harm than good. So I feel very conflicted about organized religion, but I must admit that there's some religious art, both visual and musical, but especially musical, that takes away my will to resist it. There are particular pieces of Christian music that are so moving that I find myself assenting to their spirituality while I'm listening to the music. I suppose I tend to think of my religious feelings as kind of an 'evening' thing. At the end of the day, you often allow it. But when you wake up in the morning and the sunlight comes in, you think, 'Oh, that can't be true.' But later, when the evening comes, you're ready for it once again. I also have the feeling that the same thing might happen in the 'evening' of life."

While speaking of his fascination with the life stories of other immigrants and exiles, Davis spoke about how many he encountered while he and Afkham were living in Santa Barbara, California, "I was always coming across people, who, with very little prompting, would tell me about their journeys from China or Iraq or Vietnam. They were extraordinary stories of loss and adaptation, which is one of the great historical sagas of the last hundred years or so. It might sound strange, but it's one of the reasons why I love America. It's so accommodating to people like that, and so welcoming. Many people claim that America is very hard on foreigners; but, in fact, it's much more welcoming than anywhere else, and I find that a very noble aspect of American history."

== Published works ==
=== As writer ===
- Dick Davis (1975). In the Distance. Anvil Press Poetry. ISBN 0-85646-024-9.
- —— (1980). Seeing the World. Anvil Press Poetry. ISBN 0-85646-061-3.
- —— (1984). The Covenant. Anvil Press Poetry. ISBN 0-85646-124-5.
- —— (1996). Touchwood. Anvil Press Poetry. ISBN 0-85646-269-1.
- —— (15 June 2009). Belonging: Poems. Ohio University Press. ISBN 978-0-8040-4005-1.
- —— (1 June 2009). A Trick of Sunlight: Poems. Ohio University Press. ISBN 978-0-8040-4025-9.
- Rejected Narratives and Transitional Crises within the Shāhnāme, International Shāhnāme Conference, The Second Millennium: Conference Volume, Uppsala: Acta Universitatis Upsaliensis, 2014.
- Davis, Dick (2017). Love in Another Language: Collected Poems and Selected Translations. Carcanet Press. ISBN 978-1-78410-508-2.
- Contributor to A New Divan: A Lyrical Dialogue between East and West, Gingko Library, 2019. ISBN 9781909942554

=== Translations ===
- Hafez; Jahan Malek Khatun; Obayd-e Zakani (27 August 2013). Faces of Love: Hafez and the Poets of Shiraz. Penguin Group US. ISBN 978-1-101-62717-4.
- Firdawsī (1 March 2004). The Legend of Seyavash. Mage Publishers, Incorporated. ISBN 978-0-934211-91-8.
- Firdawsī; Dick Davis (2000). Fathers and sons. Mage Publishers. ISBN 9780934211536.
- Ehsan Yarshater; Dick Davis; Firdawsī (1 January 1998). The lion and the throne. Mage Publishers. ISBN 978-0-934211-50-5.
- Īraj Pizishkzād; Dick Davis (1 January 2000). My Uncle Napoleon. Mage Publishers. ISBN 9780934211628.
- Fakhraddin Gorgani; Fakhr al-Dīn Gurgānī; Dick Davis (2008). Vis & Ramin. Mage Pub. ISBN 978-1-933823-17-1.
- Fatemeh Shams (5 June 2016). When They Broke Down the Door. Mage Publishers, Incorporated. ISBN 9781933823805.
- Various; Dick Davis (2019). Mirror of My Heart: A Thousand Years of Persian Poetry by Women. Mage Publishers. ISBN 978-1-949445-05-3.
- Nezami Ganjavi (29 July 2021). Leyli and Majnun. Mage Publishers, Incorporated. ISBN 9781949445152.
- Nezami Ganjavi (16 January 2024). Khosrow and Shirin. Mage Publishers, Incorporated. ISBN 978-1-949445-63-3.
