= Fatemeh Shams =

Persian contemporary poet, literary scholar, and translator

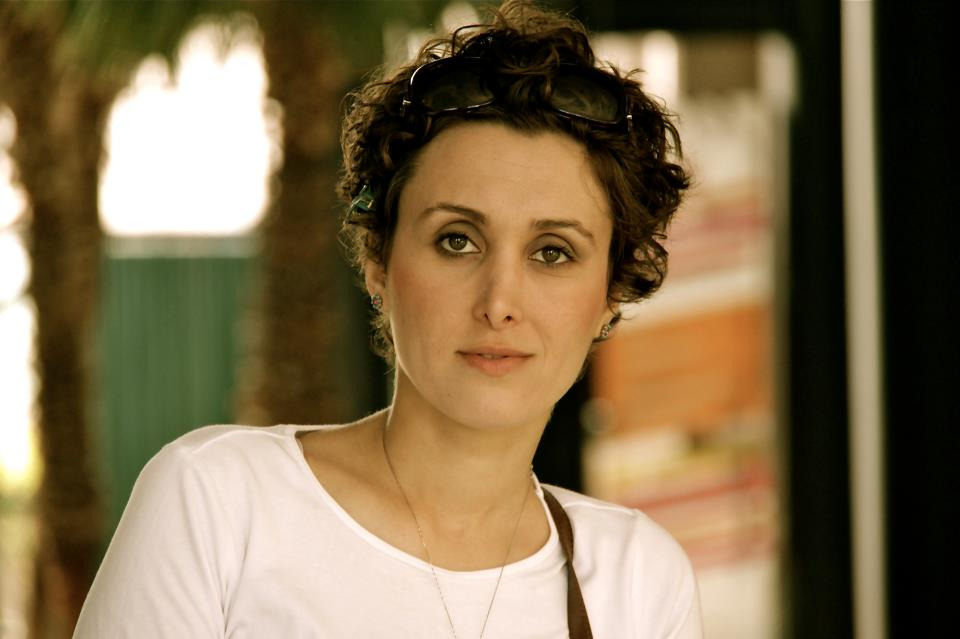
Fatemeh Shams an Iranian poet-scholar.

Fatemeh Shams, also known as Shahrzad F. Shams (Persian: فاطمه شمس) is a contemporary Persian poet, literary scholar and translator, currently based in Philadelphia, Pennsylvania and teaching Persian literature at the University of Pennsylvania. She previously taught Persian literature and language at Oxford University, Courtauld Institute of Art, Somerset House, and School of Oriental and African Studies in London, UK.

Shams earned her doctorate from Oxford University in 2015 as a Clarendon Scholar in the field of Oriental Studies. She is well known for her poems and writings on political and socio-literary issues in Iran. Her poems have been translated into English, German, Arabic, and Kurdish. Dick Davis, Armen Davoudian, Nabaz Goran, and Susan Bagheatani have translated her works into English, Kurdish, and German.

Shams was awarded the best young Persian poet in 2012 by the Jaleh Esfahani Poetry Foundation in London. She published her debut poetry collection, 88 in 2013. Her second collection was published in 2015 under the title Writing in the Mist in London. Her third bilingual collection When They Broke Down the Door received the Latifeh Yarshater award in 2016 for unique and groundbreaking developments in the form of Ghazal. Shams is currently a standing faculty member at the Department of Near Eastern Languages and Civilizations and a board member of the Middle East Centre at the University of Pennsylvania. Her groundbreaking monograph A Revolution in Rhyme: Poetic Co-Option Under Islamic Republic which has been published by Oxford University Press in 2021 is the first study of poetic legitimacy and the role of poetry and poetics in the political ideology of the Islamic Republic of Iran.

== Early life ==
Born in 1983 in Mashhad, Shams started to write poetry at the age of 14 under the influence of poets such as Simin Behbahani, Mehdi Akhavan-Sales, Esmail Khoi. In 2000, she won the silver medal in the national literature olympiad. She a year later moved to Tehran to pursue her higher education in the field of Persian literature and then sociology at Tehran University. Fatemeh moved to London in 2006 and completed her degree in the field of Muslim Civilisation at Aga Khan University. She later moved to the Oriental Institute at Oxford University to complete her doctorate in Iranian studies, where she also taught Persian language and literature and published her first poems in English. Shams was previously married to Mohammadreza Jalaeipour and were the part of reformist groups in Iranian government. Since 2020, she has been married to Brendan Bercik.

She has been a well-known female dissident poet. Since 2009, as a result of the controversial presidential election, she has been forced to live in exile following the arrest of her immediate family members (her sister and ex-husband) by the Iranian authorities.

Shams publicly renounced compulsory Hejab in 2011, which immediately made her a target of a state-sponsored online smear campaign. Ever since, she has been an outspoken feminist activist against compulsory Hejab and anti-women laws in Iran. Womanhood, Life in exile, migration, politics, war, human relationships, gender issues, and socio-political taboos are among the leading themes in her works.

== Career ==
Shams attended Tehran University to study sociology as an undergraduate. She migrated to England in 2006 to pursue her postgraduate studies at the Institute for the AKU-ISMC. After two years she joined Oxford University as a Clarendon Scholar. She graduated in 2015 with a Doctor of Philosophy (DPhil) in Oriental Studies. Broadly speaking, her research focus is the intersection of society, power, and literature. Her first monograph titled A Revolution in Rhyme: Poetic Co-option Under the Islamic Republic focuses on this topic. She is also written essays on the relationship of poetry and power and the social history of Persian literature in Iran. The history of cultural organizations in the post-revolution period, as well as the role taken by the state in literary production, have been amongst her main academic interests in the past few years.

Her poetry has received critical attention from renowned literary scholars including Ahmad Karimi Hakkak, who was the keynote speaker in her poetry book launch at the School of Oriental and African Studies (SOAS). In 2019 she was a contributor to A New Divan: A Lyrical Dialogue Between East and West.

== Works ==
=== Poetry collections ===
- When They Broke Down the Door. Translated by Dick Davis. Washington, D.C.: Mage Publishers, 2016. ISBN 9781933823755.

=== Monographs ===
- A Revolution in Rhyme: Poetic Co-option Under the Islamic Republic. Oxford: Oxford University Press, 2021. ISBN 978-0-19-885882-9.

=== Selected articles and essays ===
- Shams, Fatemeh. "Poetry and Power: State Patronage and Literary Institutions in Post-Revolutionary Iran." In: Middle Eastern Literatures, vol. 24, no. 3 (2021), pp. 310–329.
- Shams, Fatemeh. "Exile and Liminality in Contemporary Persian Poetry." In: Comparative Studies of South Asia, Africa and the Middle East, vol. 42, no. 2 (2022), pp. 215–232.

== Poetry reading ==
- Book Launch (88), Poems by Fatemeh Shams, SOAS, London, September 2013
- Poetry reading at SOAS in 2013
- Kelly Writers House in March, 2017

== See also ==
- Iranian Studies
- Persian literature
- List of Persian poets and authors
