= Mashallah Shamsolvaezin =

Iranian newspaper and magazine publisher (born 1957)

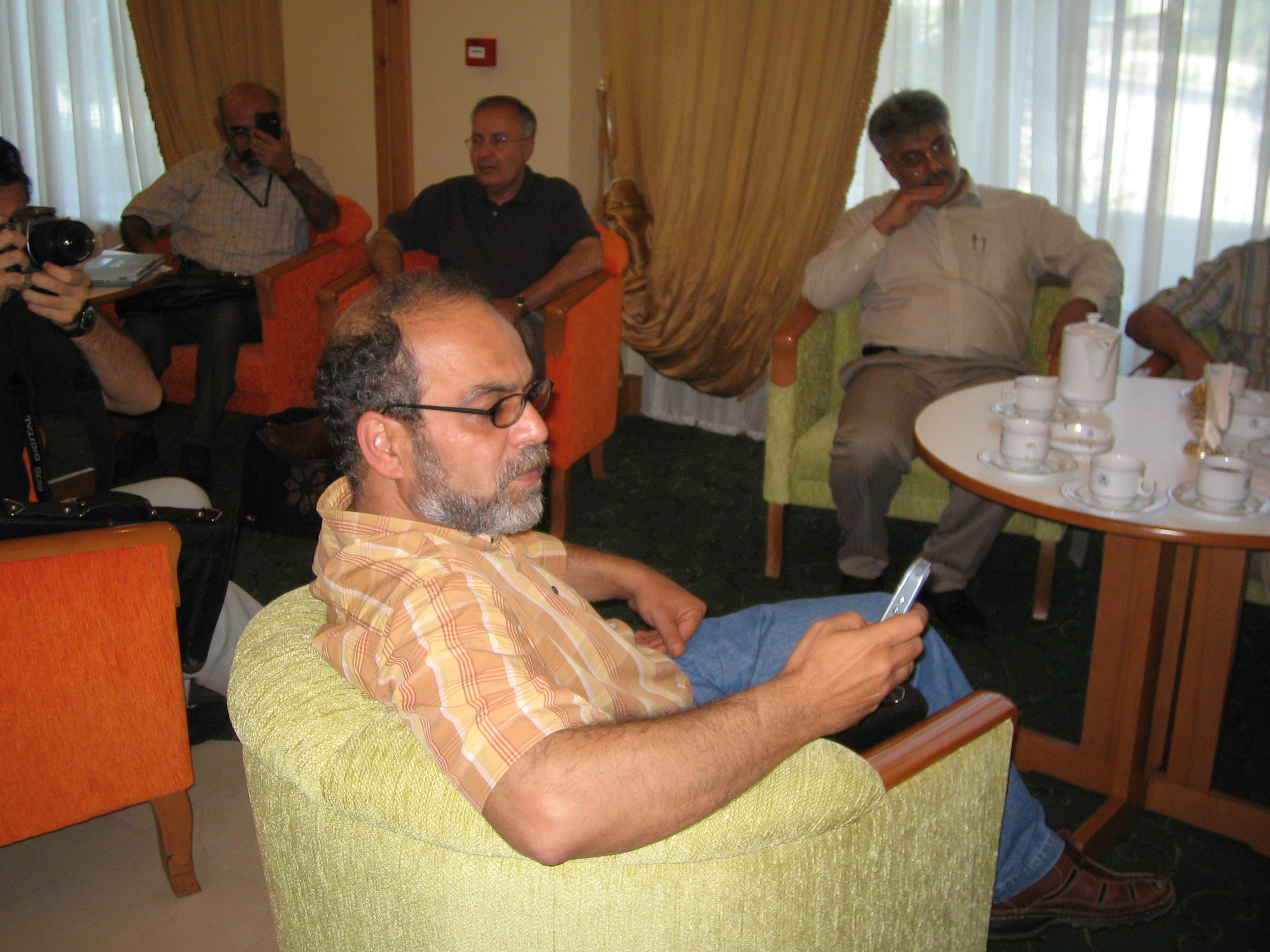
- Mashallah Shamsolvaezin (ماشاءالله شمس‌الواعظین), editor in chief of the now-banned Iranian newspapers Jame'eh, Neshat, Asr-e Azadegan, etc. Photo taken in Kish Island, Iran
- Born: 18 June 1957 (age 69); Tehran, Iran
- Occupation: journalist
- Awards: CPJ International Press Freedom Award (2000)

Mashallah Shamsolvaezin (Persian: ماشاالله شمس‌الواعظین; born 18 June 1957) is an Iranian newspaper and magazine publisher who edited many of post-revolutionary Iran's first and most widely circulated independent newspapers, including Kayhan, Jame'eh, Neshat, and Asr-e Azadegan. He currently serves as the spokesman for the Iranian Committee for the Defense of Freedom of the Press, and also as vice president of the Association of Iranian Journalists. A recipient of the 2000 CPJ International Press Freedom Award, Shamsolvaezin has been imprisoned multiple times for his journalistic activities. On June 29, 2014, he was charged with "propaganda against the state" and banned from leaving Iran. As of July 2014, he is on bail.

== Work as editor of Kayhan ==
Shamsolvaezin served as the founding editor-in-chief of the magazine Cultural Kayhan. It served as a platform for spirited debate among intellectuals, and published work by the leading Iranian thinker Abdulkarim Soroush. On the importance of Kayhan, Forough Jahanbakhsh wrote: "The journal Kiyan [sic]... can be credited for its seminal role in fostering the growth of the religious intellectual discourse of post-revolutionary Iran."

In 1984, the magazine Kayhan-i Farhangi ('Cultural Kayhan') was founded by Sayyid Mostafa Rokhsefat, Sayyid Kamal Hajj, Sayyid Javadi and Hasan Montazer Qa'im. Kayhan-i Farhangi was the first monthly magazine of thought and literature to be published after the Islamic revolution. It addressed a broad range of provocative issues, including social justice, the relationship between religion and science, and the relationship between Islam and the West. The magazine published a groundbreaking series of articles by Abdulkarim Soroush, "The Theoretical Contraction and Expansion of Religion," which laid the foundation for Soroush's influential philosophy of religious modernism. Following controversy over Soroush's articles, the magazine's editorial board was forced to resign, and Kayhan-i Farhangi was closed in 1990.

In 1991, Kayhan-i Farhangi was reopened in compliance with the cultural policy of the regime and under a new editorial board. Meanwhile, the old editorial board of Kayhan-i Farhangi founded a new journal named Kiyan, with Shamsolvaezin as editor in chief.

Kayhan was ordered closed by Tehran's Press Court on January 17, 2001. Judge Saeed Mortazavi, head of the press court, claimed that Kiyan had "published lies, disturbed public opinion and insulted sacred law."

== Work as editor of Jame'eh, Neshat, and Asr-e Azadegan ==
In 1998, Shamsolvaezin left Kayhan to serve as editor in chief of a new daily newspaper Jame'eh (Society). Jame'eh gained 300,000 readers after just 7 months of publication, becoming the country's second most widely read newspaper. Jame'eh, which was printed in color, was called "Iran's first civil society newspaper" in advertisements. The readers of Jame'eh were largely young, well-educated, and progressive. The success of this bold, independent newspaper encouraged the establishment of many of other independent newspapers in Iran.

Jame'eh focused attention on the importance of freedom of speech and healthy civil debate. A full-page article published in Jame'eh in June 1998, entitled "Religion, Freedom, and Law," was written by a cleric living in the holy city of Qum, who expanded on Khatami's famous statement that "if religion goes against freedom, it will lose." Another issue in June quoted in its headline an announcement made by Khatami to a gathering of Revolutionary Guards: "Society cannot be moved forward by instilling fear."

However, the government suspended the publishing license for Jame'eh. The journal's name was changed to Tous, and Shamsolvaezin kept publishing. Following a trial, Jame'eh was permanently closed. Shamsolvaezin and Hamid Reza Jalaeipour, the director of the publishing company for Jame'eh, were jailed without charges for thirty-five days.

After his release from jail, Shamsolvaezin founded Neshat, another independent newspaper. In September 1999, Neshat was ordered closed and Shamsolvaezin was ordered arrested, after he wrote an article critical of capital punishment in Iran. However, Shamsolvaezin was not imprisoned until November, and in the interim Shamsolvaezin received a license for, founded, and started publication of Asr-e Azadegan (Age of the Free People), which was soon also closed by the Teheran Press Court.

All of Shamsolvaezin's journals published articles written by authors with a wide spectrum of political opinions, including conservatives as well as exiled dissidents and reformists.

== Awards and arrests ==
Shamsolvaezin was a recipient of the 2000 CPJ International Press Freedom Award, given by the Committee to Protect Journalists.

In June 1998, after Jame'eh was closed, Shamsolvaezin was jailed for thirty-five days and then released without trial. In April 2000, he was sentenced to 30 months in jail for "insulting Islamic principles," for publishing an article critical of capital punishment in Iran as editor of Neshat. He spent 17 months imprisoned at Evin Prison before he was released in the summer of 2001. "We have freedom of expression in Iran. But the problem is freedom after expression," Shamsolvaezin said.

On the morning December 28, 2009, Mashallah Shamsolvaezin was arrested at his Tehran home in the aftermath of the 2009 Ashura protests. Six plainclothes agents reportedly entered Shamsolvaezin's house with a blank warrant. He demanded that police produce a warrant that included his name, but was nevertheless arrested and taken away. He was released on bail on February 28, 2010.

On June 29, 2014, at Evin Prison Court, he was interrogated for two hours and charged with "propaganda against the state". The charges are in response to interviews and speeches. He was released on a bail of 2 billion rials (about $80,000), secured on the deed to his mother's home, and banned from foreign travel.
