= Jahan Malek Khatun =

Iranian princess and poet

- Khātūn
- Born: c. 1324; Shiraz
- Died: c. 1393
- Spouse: Amīn al-Dīn Jahromī
- House: Injuids
- Father: Jalāl ud-Din Masūʿdshāh
- Mother: A daughter of Ghiyas al-Din ibn Rashid al-Din
- Occupation: Poet

Jahan Malek Khatun (Persian: جهان ملك خاتون, jahān malik khātūn) was an Injuid poet and princess. She wrote under pen name Jahān (Persian: جهان, lit. 'World') and was a contemporary of the poet Hafez.

== Life ==
Her birthdate is not known, but her parents were married in 1324, so she must have been born after that date. Her father was Jalāl al-Dīn Masūʿdshāh and her mother was a daughter of Ghiyas al-Din Hamadani. It was usual for Injuid noble women to receive a good education, and Jahan's was exceptionally good because she was an only child, so the attention usually given to sons was given to her instead. Her step-mother was a Chupanid princess, Sultānbakht - daughter of Dimashq Khwaja, who married Masūʿdshāh in Baghdad in 1342. After her father's marriage she too was married to Amin al-Din Jahrumi between 1343 and 1347, who was a companion of the Injuid ruler, and nephew of Shaikh Jamāl al-Dīn Abu Ishāq. Masūʿdshāh was deposed in 1339 by allies of Shams al-Dīn Muhammad and Chupanid Pir Hosayn. Masūʿdshāh fled to Luristan where he was finally killed while bathing by Yagi Basti's men in 1342. Jahan Malek was brought up and guarded by her uncle Abu Ishāq, who finally fell from power in 1353 when Mubariz al-Din Muhammad captured Shiraz and executed Ishaq in 1357. After the downfall of her family, Jahan remained at court where it is likely that she played an active role, following in the footsteps of her close female relatives.

== Poetry ==
Jahan Malek Khatun primarily composed ghazals, intended to be read in informal, intimate settings. Her uncle, Abu Ishaq, loved literature and it is likely that he encouraged her to write poetry, as was customary for noble women in Persia. The introduction to her divan, written by Jahan herself, suggests that she wrote poetry as a means to leave something behind after her death, and to deal with her tumultuous life at court. She mentioned several rulers in her poems, like Mubariz al-Din Muhammad, Shah Shoja Mozaffari, Ahmad Jalayir, Shah Mansur and Miran Shah, giving a clue about her lifespan. She was a contemporary of Ubayd Zakani, Khwaju Kermani and Hafez. She was at odds with Ubayd Zakani who mocked her poetry alongside Kamal Khujandi. Her divan is the largest known divan from any woman poet of pre-modern times, containing 4 qasidas, one strophe-poem, a lengthy elegy, 12 fragments, 357 rubai and 1413 ghazals. Only 4 known manuscripts are located at British Library, National Library of France, Topkapi Palace and Cambridge University Library. She was influenced by Saadi and other women poets of her time including Padshah Khatun and Qutluqshah Khatun (wife of Öljaitü and daughter of Irinjin).

== Pen name ==
It was usual for Injuid princesses to write poetry under a pen name, disguising their identity and emphasising their piety, but Jahan did neither. The concept of Jahan, "the World", was used by contemporary poets to refer to an imaginary female figure who was ruthless and seductive, conspiring to murder her many lovers. For Jahan Malek Khatun to use this name neither concealed her feminine identity nor emphasised religious virtues, making it notable in its context.

== Publications ==
Like many 14th-century ghazal writers, Jahān was overshadowed by her more famous contemporary Hafez. She remained an obscure poet until her work was published in Iran for the first time in 1995. Jahān’s introduction to Western audiences came in 2007, when Sheema Kalbasi translated her poetry from Persian into English and included in Seven Valleys of Love: A Bilingual Anthology of Women Poets from Middle Ages Persia to Present Day Iran, with a subsequent edition in 2008. Kalbasi later translated a larger collection of Jahān's poems, published as Jahan Malek Khatun: The Princess Poet of 14th-Century Persia in 2024 by Daraja Press.
