= Kamal Khujandi =

Persian poet (1320–1400)

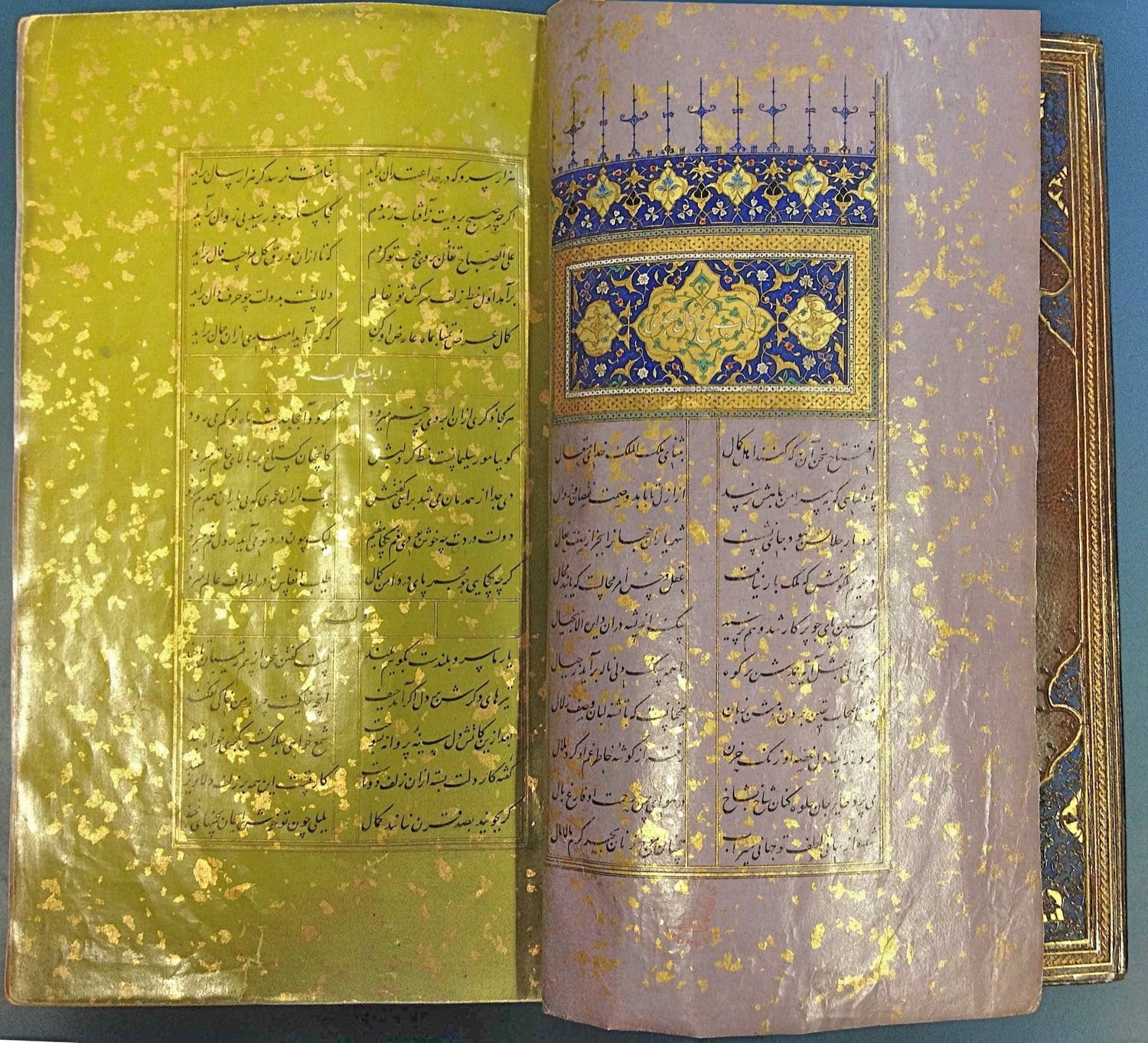
Opening to the Divan of Kamal Khujandi copied by royal scribe Sharaf al-Din Husayn Sultani, dated Shamakhi at the beginning of Rabiʻ II 873/ October 1468. British Library

Inscription in Persian on the wall of the Tomb of Two Kamals in Tabriz.

Kamal Khujandi (Persian: کمال خجندی; 1320–1400), also Kamal Khojandi, Kamaleddin Khojandi, or Kamal-e Khojandi, was a Persian sufi and Persian ghazal poet of the 14th century (8th century hijri).

He was born in Khujand, today the capital of Sughd in Tajikistan. He lived in Tabriz and died in 1400 CE (807 AH).

He is counted among the great romantic poets of the 14th century, like Amir Khosrow Dehlavi, Khwaju Kermani and Hafez. He was also a contemporary of Hafez. The modern Persian novelist and short story writer Sadegh Hedayat and his family trace their ancestry to Kamal Khojandi.

Khojandi's tomb is located in the Tomb of Two Kamals at Tabriz, Iran, beside the tomb of Kamaleddin Behzad. There is also a statue of Kamal Khojandi nearby.

In 1996, a monument and museum were erected in the poet’s homeland in Tajikistan.

== See also ==
- Kamaleddin Behzad
- Sadegh Hedayat
- List of Persian poets and authors
- Persian literature
