= Sheema Kalbasi =

Sheema Kalbasi (Persian: شیما کلباسی; born November 20, 1972, in Tehran, Iran) is an Iranian, Danish, and American poet who addresses issues of feminism, war, refugees, human rights, and freedom of expression. She is also a filmmaker focusing on women's issues and activism for women's rights, minority rights, children's rights, and refugees' rights. Kalbasi grew up in the Middle East, South Asia, and Europe, and now makes her home in the United States.

== Biography ==
Sheema Kalbasi
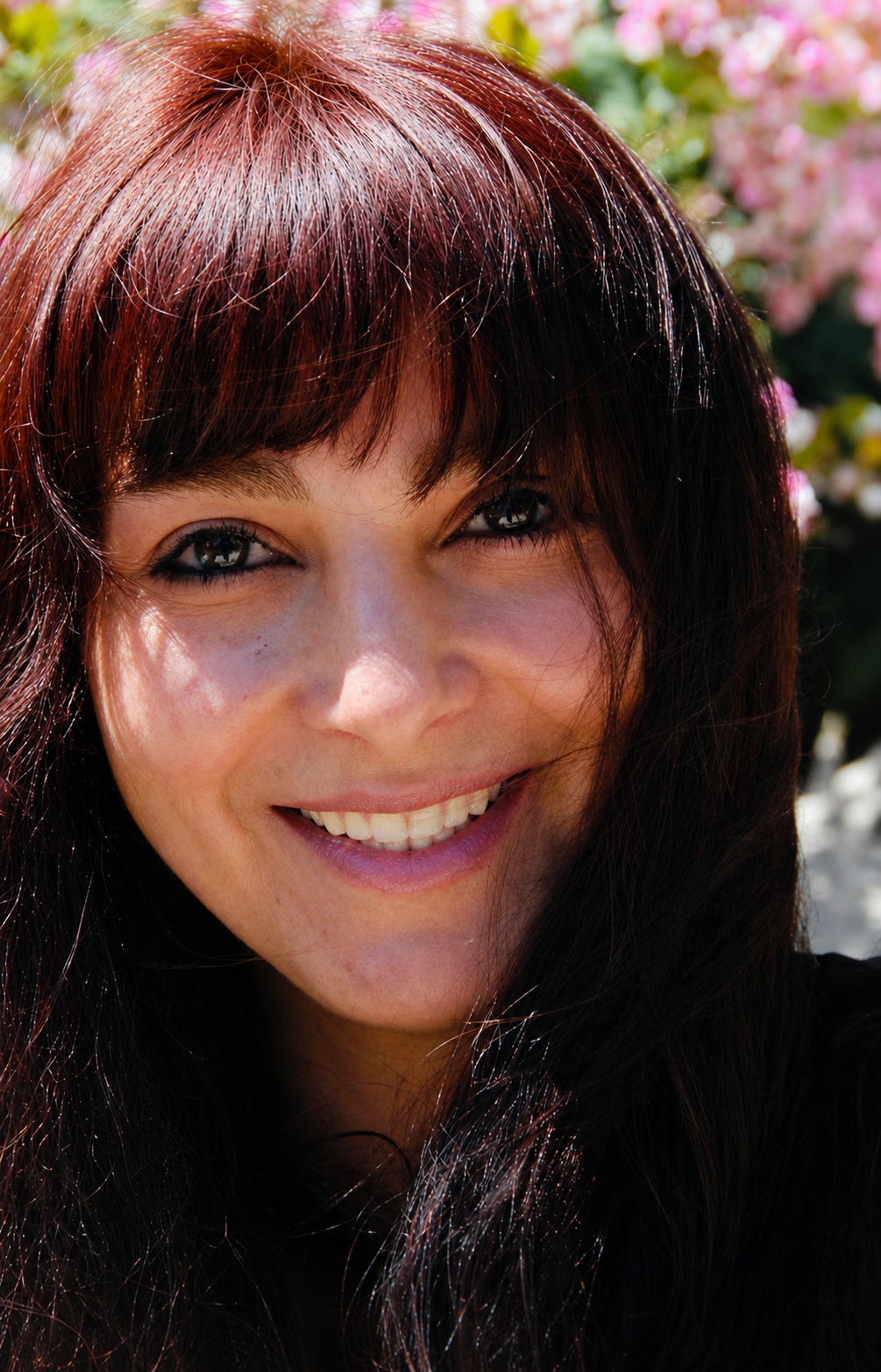
- Sheema Kalbasi at a literary event at Pomona College, Claremont, California.
- Occupations: Poet, writer, historian
- Writing career
- Notable works: Echoes in Exile, Spoon and Shrapnel

Sheema Kalbasi is a poet, multi-genre writer, literary translator, and humanitarian whose work has garnered international recognition. She has taught refugee children and worked with organizations such as the UNHCR, the Center for Refugees in Pakistan, and UNA Denmark. In Denmark, she also trained and served as a defense soldier.

Her poetry has been anthologized and translated into over twenty languages, earning critical acclaim. In 2012, Canadian Senator LGen (Ret.) the Hon. Roméo Dallaire concluded a speech on the situation in Iran by reciting excerpts from her poem, Hezbollah. A winner of Harvest International, the poem has also been anthologized and published amongst others in The Forbidden: Poems from Iran and its Exiles, the Atlanta Review, and Iranian and Diasporic Literature in the 21st Century: A Critical Study by Dr. Daniel Grassian. In 2025, Sheema Kalbasi was named one of the top ten influential American poets of the 21st century, alongside Joy Harjo, Ada Limón, and Tracy K. Smith, in To Write of This Country and Reckon with America through Contemporary Women Poets by Dr. Thayer Wescott. Her poem The Passenger was selected by invitation for performance at the Tribute World Trade Center in New York in 2008. In 2016, her poems Possession and Dancing Tango were adapted into an art song for mezzo-soprano and piano and performed at Old Dominion University in Virginia. Kalbasi's poetry and translations have been incorporated into academic curricula worldwide, adapted into short films, and set to music for soprano and piano trio compositions. A notable performance of a composition based on her work took place at the Smithsonian National Museum. Her essay "How Iran's 'Woman, Life, Freedom' Protests Live On Today," published by Democracy for the Arab World Now (DAWN), was nominated for the Pulitzer Prize in Opinion Writing.

Kalbasi is the author of the full-length poetry collection Echoes in Exile (PRA Publishing, USA, 2006), and the chapbook The War Took Our Names (Seven Kitchens Press, USA, 2026), selected for publication in the Allison Joseph Series. Echoes in Exile has been featured on Stony Brook University's Women and Gender Studies reading list. She is a Pushcart Prize–winning poet, a nominee for the PEN Award for Poetry in Translation, a recipient of a United Nations humanitarian award, and a grantee of the Ministry of Foreign Affairs of the Netherlands.

As part of her scholarly work, Kalbasi has introduced numerous Persian poets to English-speaking audiences. In Seven Valleys of Love: A Bilingual Anthology of Women Poets from Medieval Persia to Present-Day Iran first published by PRA Publishing in 2007 with a subsequent edition in 2008, she presented the first English translations of the 14th-century ghazal writer Jahan Malek Khatun, alongside other women poets from Iran's literary tradition. She also translated the poetry of Simin Behbahani, a two-time Nobel Prize nominee in Literature, which was set to music by composer Ramin Amin Tafreshi in the Netherlands. Her translation of Forough Farrokhzad's poetry was included in The Kenyon Review in celebration of Farrokhzad's ninetieth birthday. In addition to bringing Persian poetry to English-speaking audiences, Kalbasi has translated the works of American poets Joseph Fasano, John Freeman, Melissa Studdard, and Larry Jaffe, as well as Italian poet Alessio Zanelli, amongst others, into Persian. Her work has also been featured by Black Lawrence Press, PEN America and NPR. Notably, acclaimed poet Naomi Shihab Nye writes about Kalbasi's Spoon and Shrapnel: Verse and Wartime Recipes (Daraja Press, Canada, 2024): “This book is a treasure. Sheema Kalbasi offers an exquisitely nourishing combination of simple, sustaining recipes recalled from her war-ravaged Iranian childhood, along with evocative poems asking essential questions—why so much war?”

In 2019, she was invited to Rome as the main speaker at the United Nations World Food Programme, where she delivered an address on the impact of poverty on families' decisions to marry off their underage children, highlighting it as a global issue affecting the Middle East, South Asia, South America, and even the United States, where underage marriage persists in certain states.

In 2026, a social media post by Kalbasi describing her experience with the Iranian Revolutionary Guard Corps at age 11 received international media coverage, including in Bild and Libertatea.

In 2009, Kalbasi served as a judge for the Anita McAndrews Award (Poets for Human Rights), selecting Katie Sarah Zale’s poem “The Refugee at Al-Arroub Fails to Explain” as the winning entry.

That same year, she joined 266 Iranian academics, academics, writers, artists, and journalists in signing an open letter of apology published on Iranian.com condemning the persecution of Baháʼís.

== Freedom of Speech and Political Advocacy ==
Kalbasi has written and spoken publicly in support of freedom of expression and against censorship in Iran. Her work addresses topics including gender apartheid, the treatment of women and minorities under the Islamic Republic of Iran, and the effects of theocratic rule. She has drawn on her own experience of political repression in Iran in both her writing and her advocacy work.

== Gender and Advocacy ==
Kalbasi's work addresses gender apartheid, forced veiling, honor killings, underage marriage, self-immolation, acid attacks, the persecution of homosexuals, blasphemy laws, food shortages, and hunger. These themes recur throughout her published work and public speaking engagements.

== Publications ==
=== Books ===
- Jahan Malek Khatun: The Princess Poet of 14th-Century Persia (Daraja Press, Canada, 2026)
- Spoon and Shrapnel: Verse and Wartime Recipes (Daraja Press, Canada, 2024)
- Selected Poetry of Christian Rimestad (Translator, Editor, Reel Content Publishing, 2017)
- Marginalia: The Women of Danish Poetry (Translator, Editor, Reel Content Publishing, USA, 2017)
- The Poetry of Iranian Women (Editor, Reel Content Publishing, USA, 2009)
- Seven Valleys of Love: A Bilingual Anthology of Women Poets from Medieval Persia to Present-Day Iran (Translator, Editor, PRA Publishing, USA, 2007, 2008)
- Echoes in Exile (PRA Publishing, USA, 2006) – A full-length poetry collection.
- Sangsar (The Stoning) (Sinbad Publishing, USA, 2005)

Chapbooks

- The War Took Our Names (Seven Kitchens Press, USA, 2026) — Selected for the Allison Joseph Series
- Wings Stronger Than Any Fear (Anhinga Press, USA, 2026) — Winner of the Rick Campbell Chapbook Award

=== Selected essays ===
- How Iran's 'Woman, Life, Freedom' Protests Live On Today, Democracy for the Arab World Now (DAWN).
- Iran's Current Uprising and the Collapse of Ideological Legitimacy, Democracy for the Arab World Now (DAWN).
- Iran and the World: A Defining Crossroads, Havok Journal.
- The Last Note of the Sea, New Limestone Review, University of Kentucky.
- The Witness, FEATURE PICK, The Berlin Literary Review.
- The Language of Moss, SPLIT ROCK REVIEW.

== Filmography ==
| Film | Date | |
|---|---|---|
| Women on the Front Line | 2013 | Documentary |
| Simin Behbahani —For the Dream to Ride | 2013 | Poem film |
| Banafsheh Hejazi —Disappointment | 2013 | Poem film |
| Sholeh Wolpe —I Was Sung into This World | 2013 | Poem film |
| Farzaneh Ghavami —The Park | 2013 | Poem film |

== Awards ==
- Pushcart Prize, 2025, for "Refuge," from Spoon and Shrapnel
- Rick Campbell Chapbook Award, Anhinga Press, 2026, for Wings Stronger Than Any Fear
- Indie Excellence Award, 2008, Echoes in Exile
- Third Place, JerseyWorks, 2008, for "The Passenger"
- Best Poem, Harvest International, 2006, for "Hezbollah," from Echoes in Exile
- Human Rights Award and Recognition: UNHCR, Center for Refugees (Islamabad, Pakistan)
- Distinguished Humanitarian Award: Center for Refugees (Islamabad, Pakistan)

Nominations

- Seven Valleys of Love, The PEN Award for Poetry in Translation, 2008
- Seven Valleys of Love, Pushcart Prize, 2008
- Seven Valleys of Love, Anisfield-Wolf Book Award, 2008
- Echoes in Exile, Collection, Annual Library of Virginia Literary Award, 2007
- Echoes in Exile, Pushcart Prize, 2006
- Echoes in Exile, USA Book News Best Books Award, Finalist, 2006

== See also ==
- List of Iranian women
