= Bustan (book) =

Book of Persian poetry by Saadi

The Bustan (Persian: بوستان, romanized: Būstān, lit. 'Orchard') is a book of poetry by the Persian poet Saadi, completed in 1257 CE and dedicated to the Salghurid Atabeg Sa'd I or Sa'd II. Bustan is considered one of Saadi's two major works.

It was Saadi's first work. The book contains the fruits of Saadi's long experience and his judgements upon life, and is illustrated by a vast collection of anecdotes. It includes accounts of Saadi's travels and his analysis of human psychology. He often mentions his accounts with fervour and advice similar to Aesop's Fables. The book has ten chapters regarding the issues of ethics and training; namely, justice, mercy, love, humility, contentment, devotions, education, gratitude, repentance, and praying.

The Bustan is among the 100 greatest books of all time according to Bokklubben World Library. It is composed in mathnawī style (rhyming couplets), and has been translated into English. In 1688, the Bustan was translated into Dutch by Daniel Havart.

In India, Bustan and Gulistan were taught to schoolboys in maktabs, and it had to be learnt by heart.

== Gallery ==
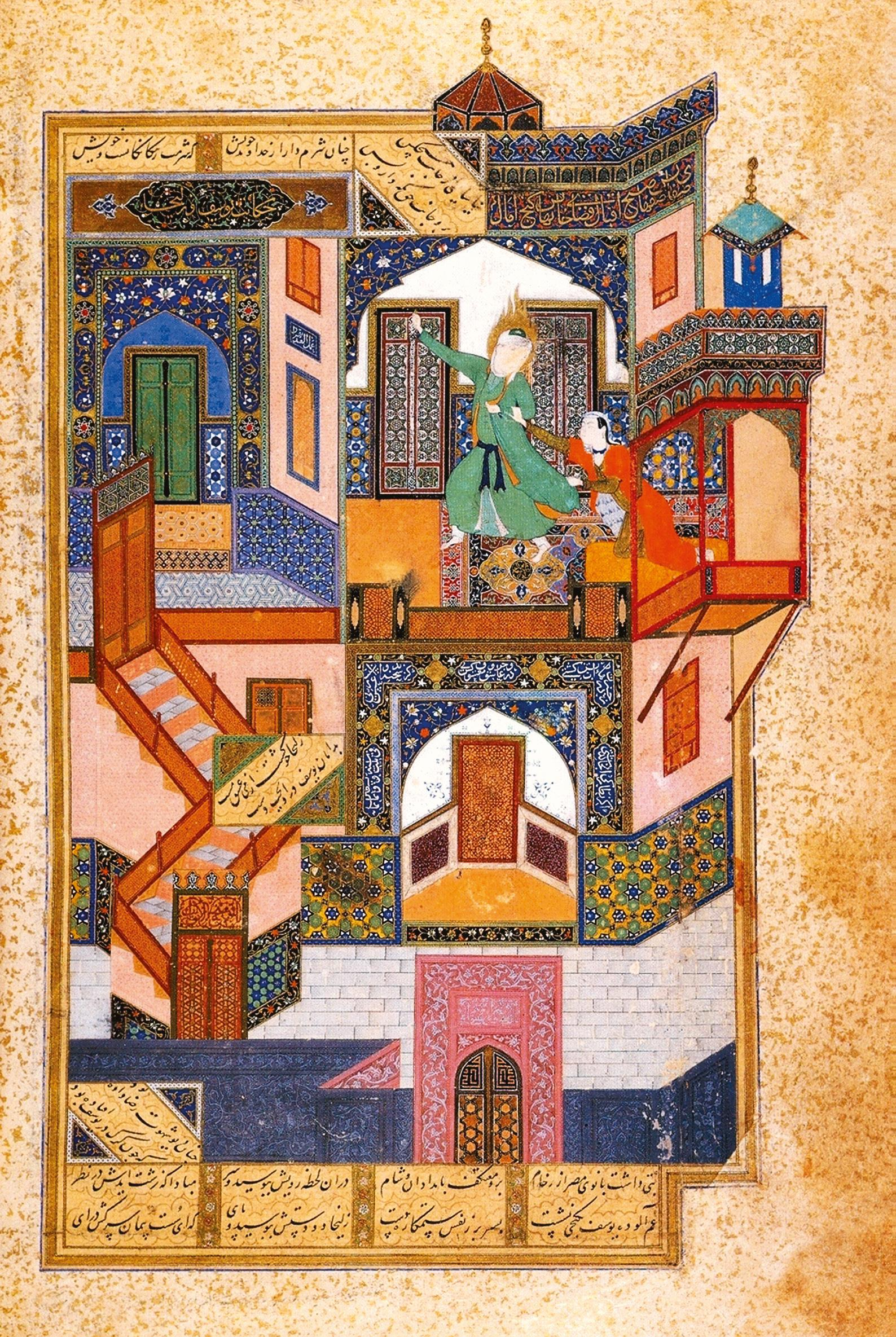
Yusuf and Zulaikha. Miniature by Behzad from the Timurid copy of Bustan. Herat, 1488. Egyptian National Library

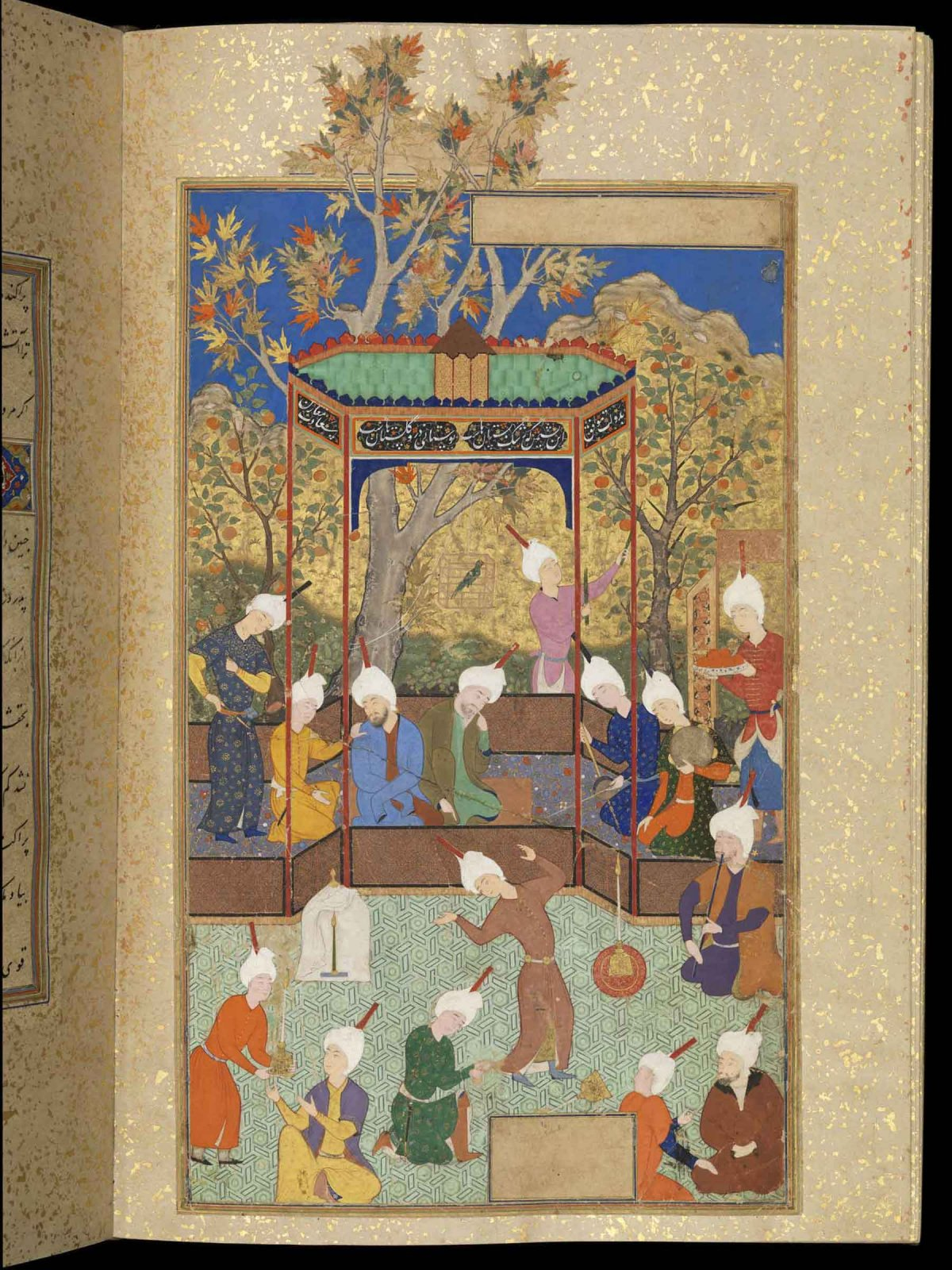
A party at night. Safavid miniature (possibly by Mirza Ali) attached to the Timurid copy of Bustan. Tabriz, c. 1540. Chester Beatty Library

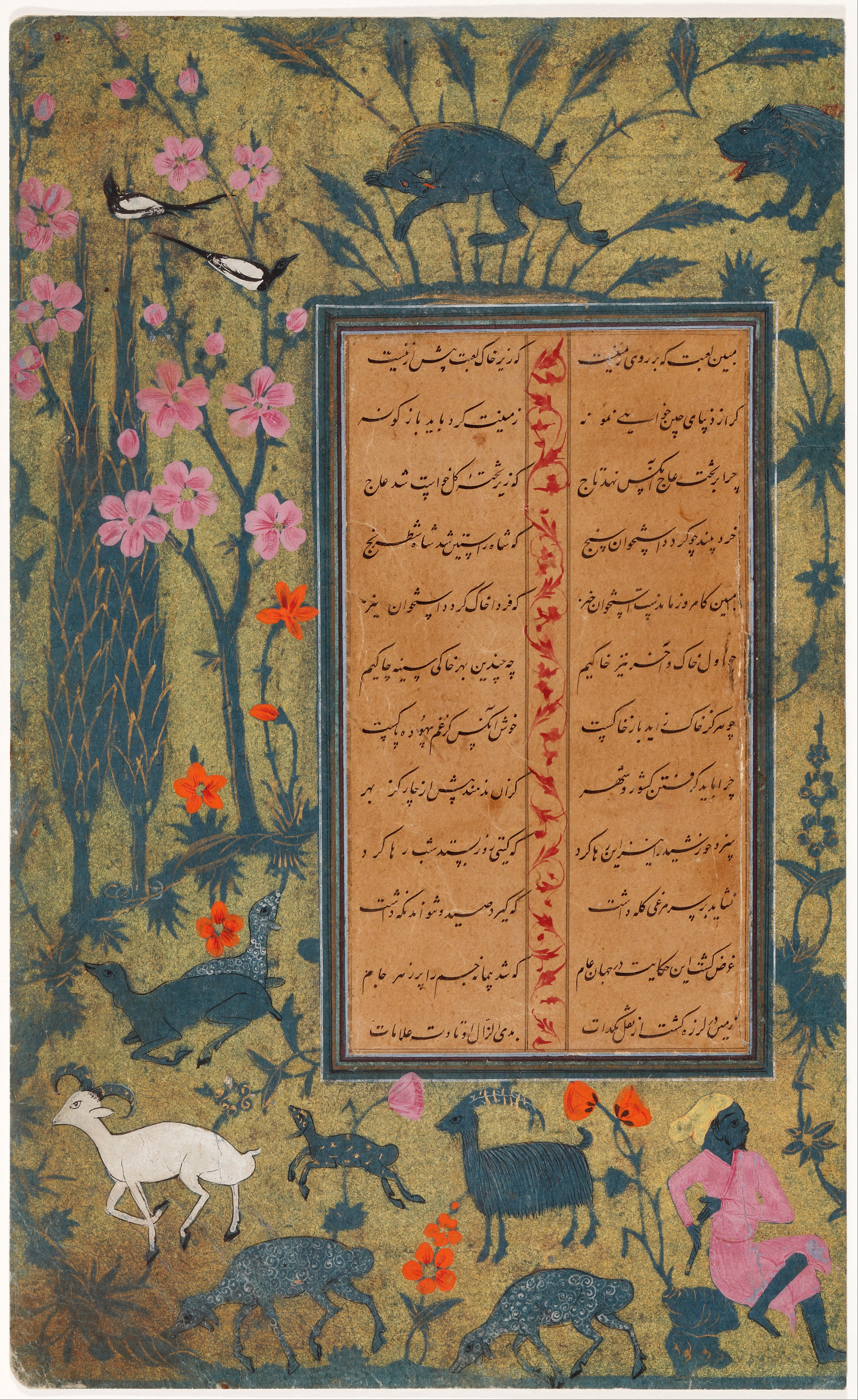
Page from the Safavid copy of Bustan written in nastaliq script. C. 1560–1570. Lázaro Galdiano Museum

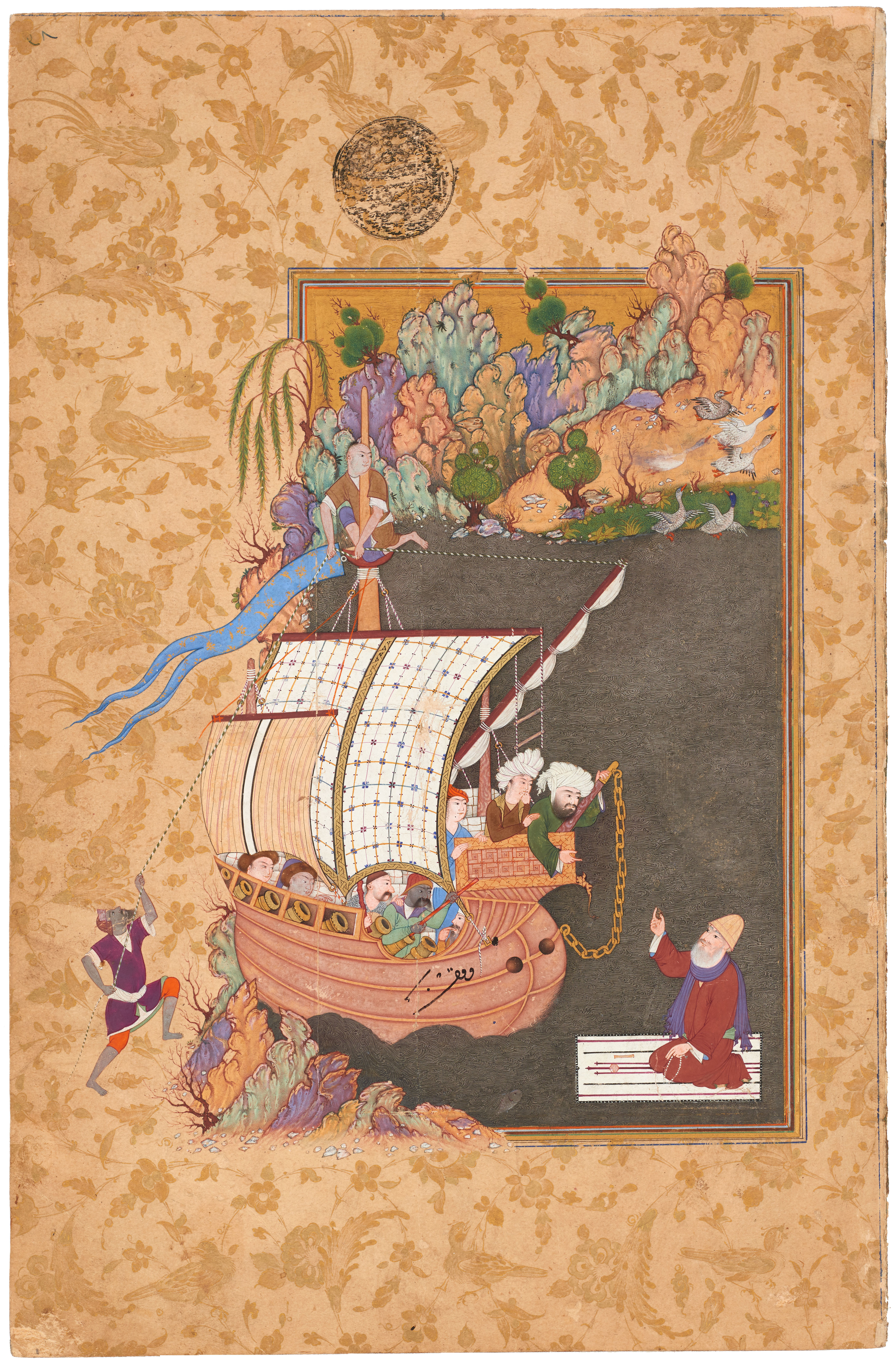
The Dervish from Faryab Crosses the River on his Rug. Miniature by Habiballah Savaji from the Safavid copy of Bustan. Isfahan, c. 1600–1608. The David Collection

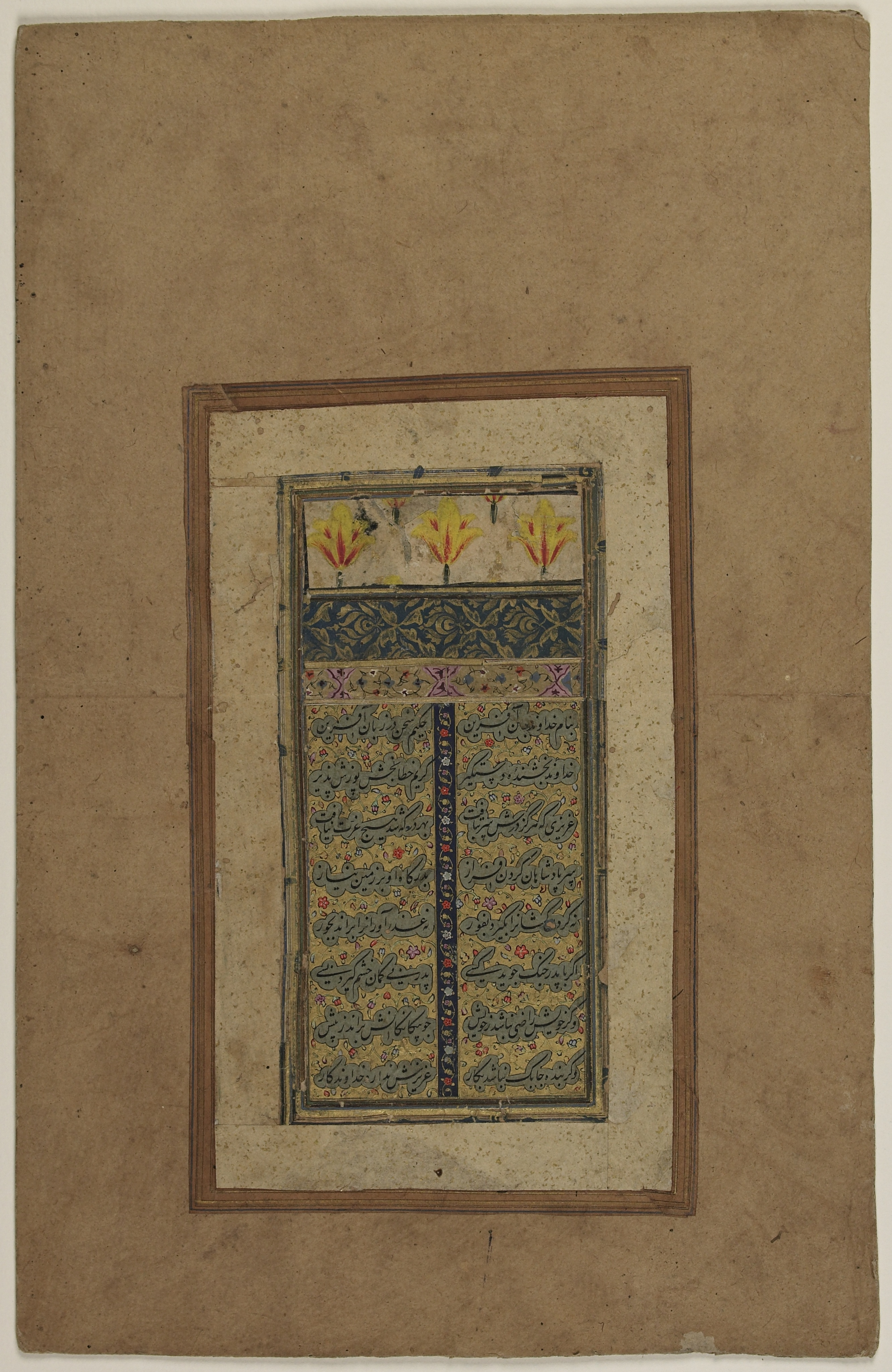
The first page of the Mughal copy of Bustan. Probably Abd al-Rashid Daylami, 17th century. Library of Congress

== See also ==
- Lote tree
- Persian literature
- Kolliyat-e Saadi
