= Neshat =

Daily newspaper in Iran (1998–2005)

- Type: Daily newspaper
- Format: Broadsheet
- Owner: Morteza Fallah
- Founder: Hamid Reza Jalaipour
- Publisher: Latif Safari (former)
- Founded: 1998
- Ceased publication: 2005
- Political alignment: Reformist
- Language: Persian
- Headquarters: Tehran
- Country: Iran
- ISSN: 2173-4976

Neshat (Persian: نشاط, lit. 'Vivacity or Joy') was a reformist and moderate daily newspaper published in Tehran, Iran. The paper was founded in 1998 and published until 2005 when it was banned by the Iranian authorities.

== History and profile ==
Neshat was launched by Hamid Reza Jalaipour in 1998 after two other reformist papers, Jameah and Toos, were closed down. The paper was their successor. The paper was based in Tehran. Latif Safari was the publisher and director of the daily. Mashallah Shamsolvaezin served as the editor-in-chief of the paper. Most of the editors were those who had written for Jameah and Toos newspapers.

The paper, a reformist and moderate publication, was banned on 4 September 1998 shortly after its start. It was again banned by the Iran's Press Court in September 1999 following the publication of articles which had challenged the death sentence in Iran. In addition, there were a total of 74 charges against the paper. Due to these charges the paper was found guilty of "insulting the sanctity and tenets of Islam."

In November 1999 Mashallah Shamsolvaezi was also arrested and taken to the Evin prison due to the articles mentioned above. He was sentenced to three years in prison. The publisher of the daily, Latif Safari, was also sentenced to two-and-a-half years in prison in April 2000 for publishing the articles. The ban was lifted by Iran's supreme court in March 2005. However, it was again shut down later.

In September 2013 it was reported that Neshat would be relaunched, and its license holder would be Morteza Fallah. In addition, Mashallah Shamsolvaezi would resume his post as the editor-in-chief of the paper, and Ahmad Sattari would be its managing editor. However, the necessary publication license was not granted by the authorities.
