= Tomb of Two Kamals =

Funerary monument in Tabriz, Iran

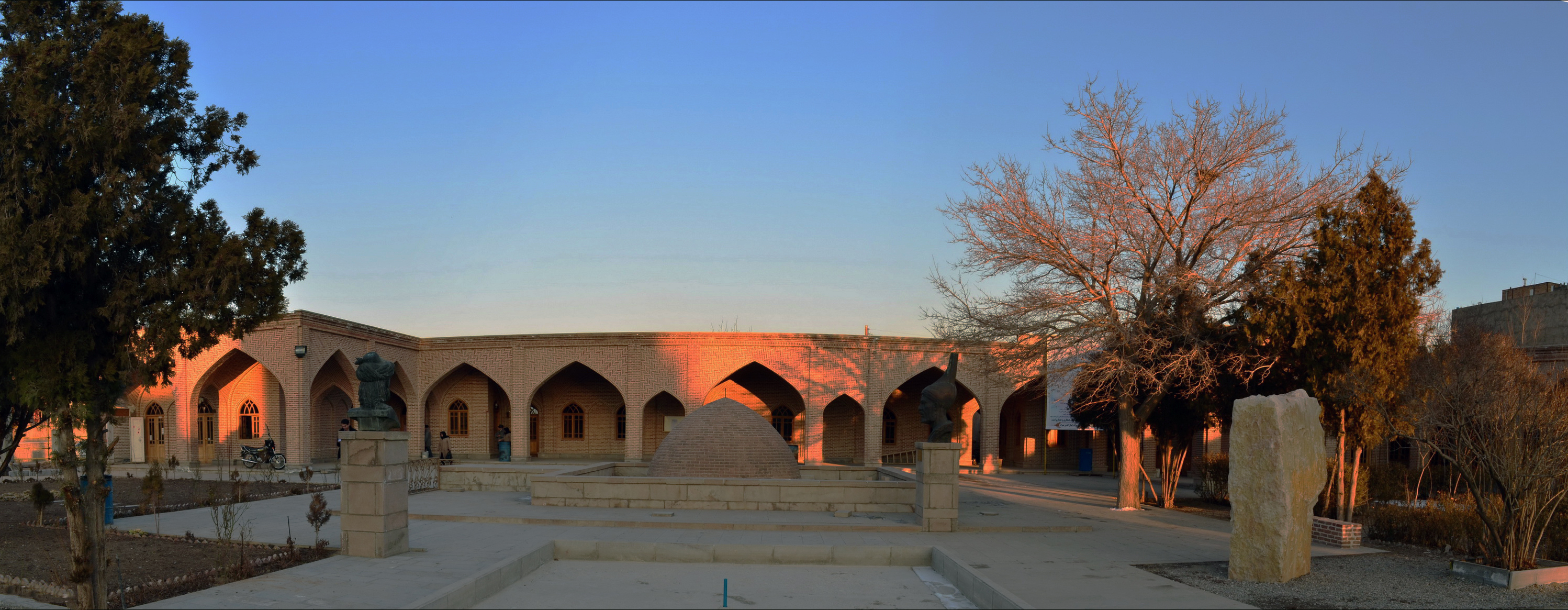
- Interactive map of the Tomb of Two Kamals area

General information
- Location: Tabriz, Iran

The Tomb of Two Kamals (Persian: آرامگاه دو کمال), or in short the 2-Kamal Tomb, is a funerary monument in Tabriz, Iran. The to Kamals — the 14th-century poet Kamal Khujandi and the 15th-century miniaturist Kamal ed-Din Behzad — are buried in an underground chamber below a simple stone dome. The mausoleum also houses the remains of other artists and poets.

Built in the Safavid era as part of a larger cemetery, but deteriorated over the next centuries and was only restored in 1959. In the 2010s, a school was built around the mausoleum, housing classrooms, a museum, a library, and other places which commemorate the legacies of the artists buried therein.

== Gallery ==
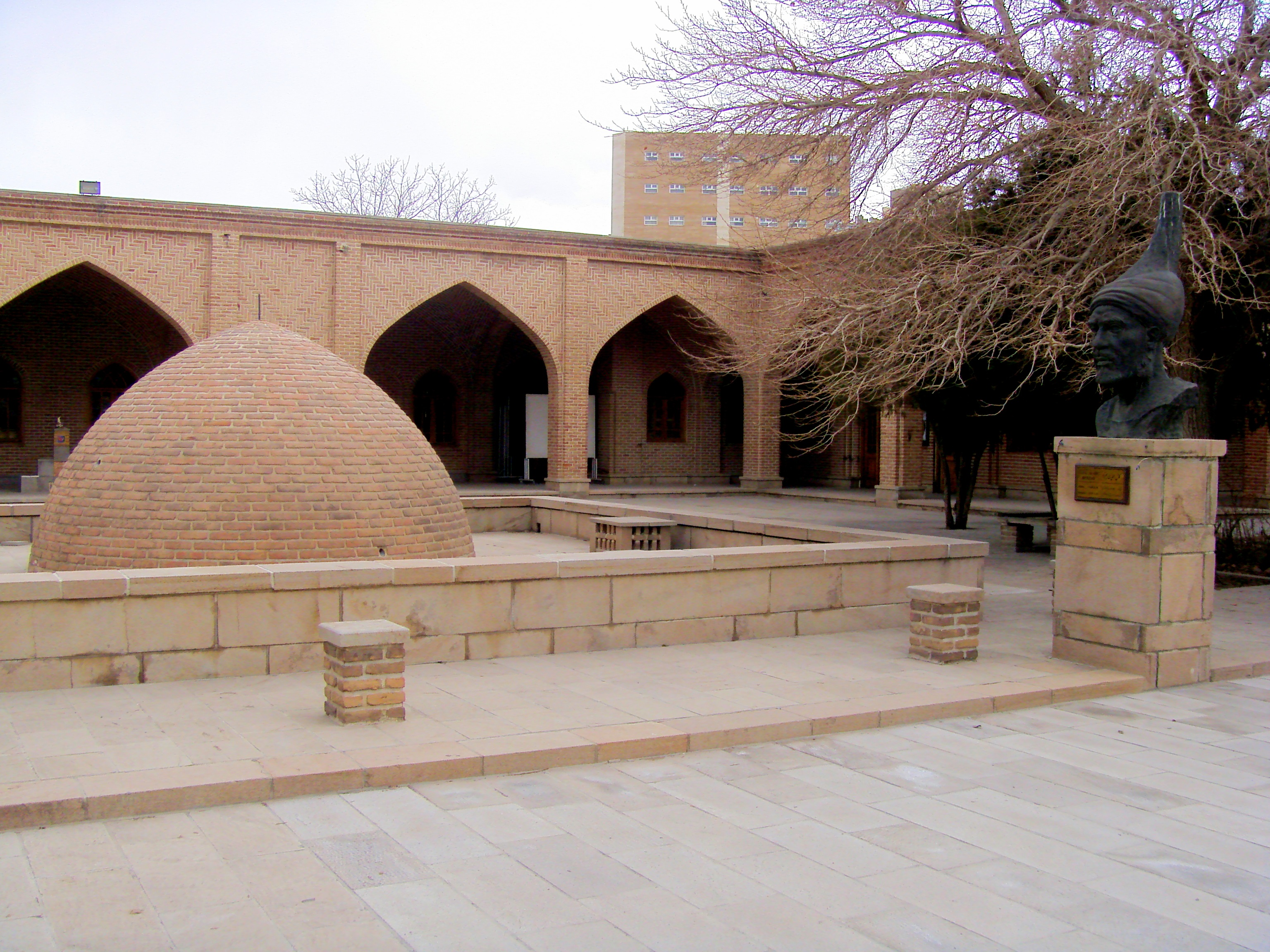

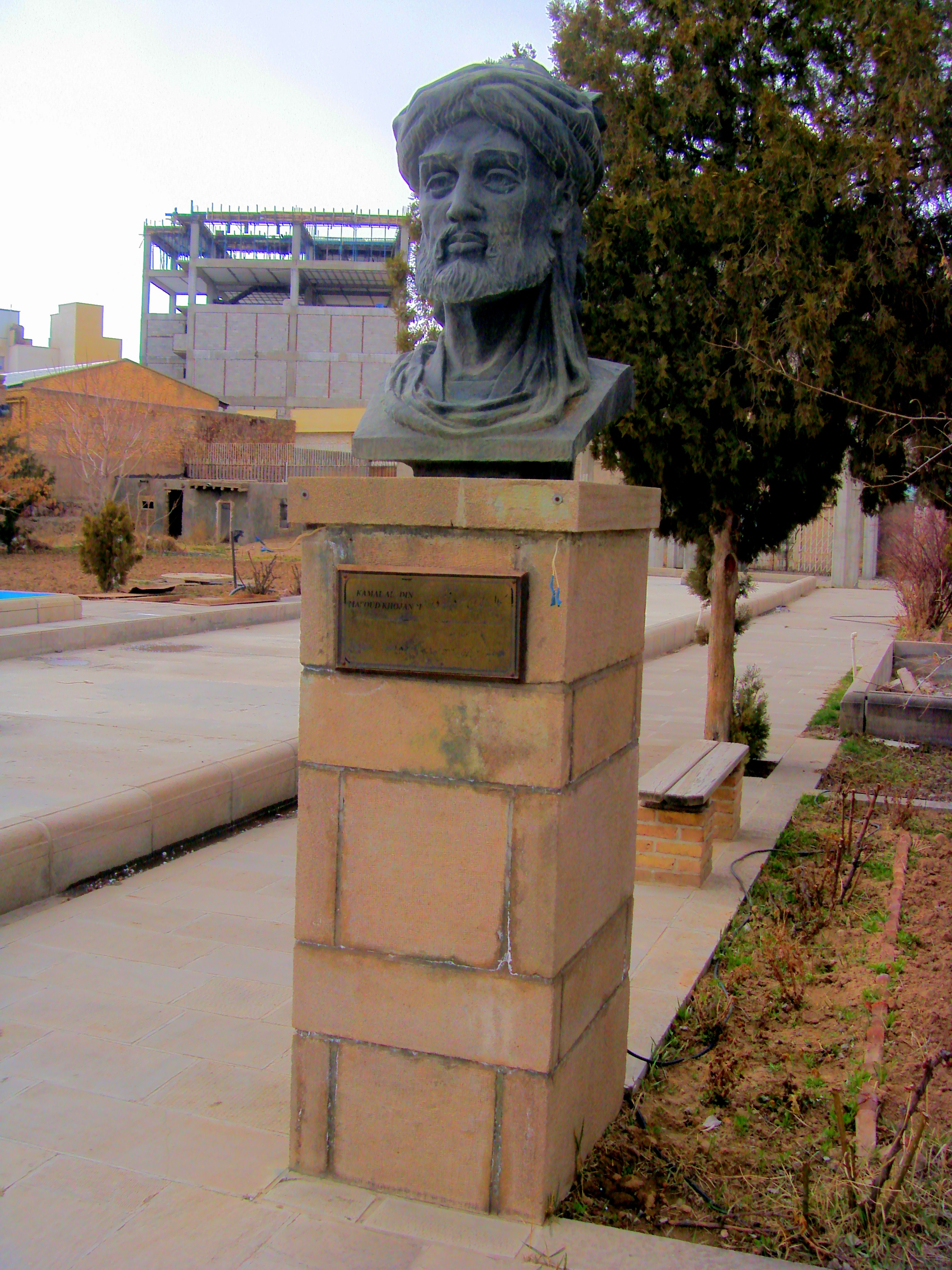
Bust of Kamal Khujandi

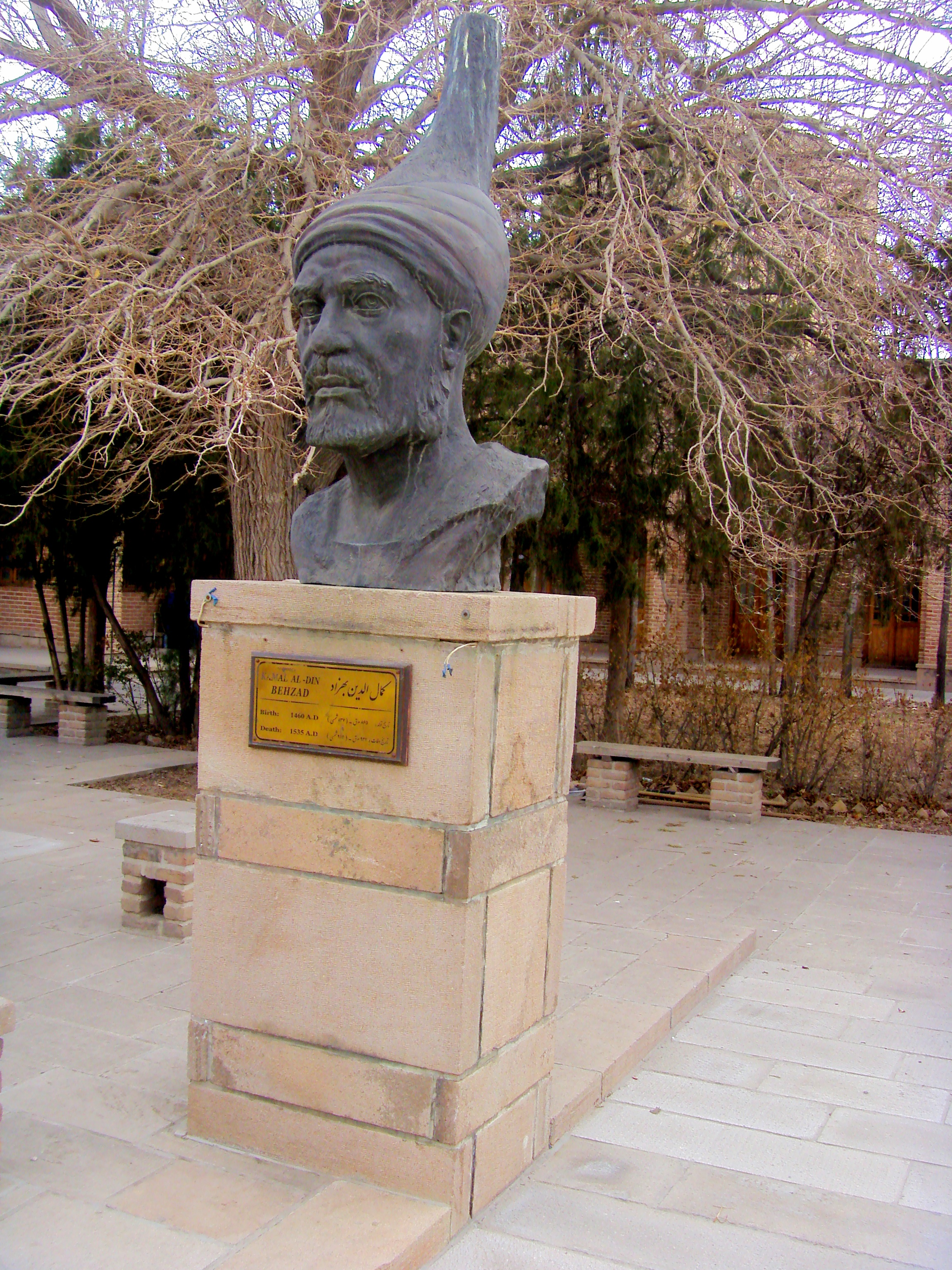
Bust of Kamāl ud-Dīn Behzād
