= Association of Iranian Journalists =

Organization in Iran

- Founded: 1997
- Headquarters: Tehran
- Location: Iran
- Members: +4,000 (2008)
- Key people: Rajabali Mazroei; Mashallah Shamsolvaezin
- Affiliations: International Federation of Journalists (IFJ)
- Website: aoij.ir

The Association of Iranian Journalists (Persian: انجمن صنفی روزنامه‌نگاران ایران) is a professional organization in Iran that serves to "protect and safeguard the legal and professional rights of Iranian journalists." The organization was created in 1997 at the onset of the presidency of reformist Mohammad Khatami. In 2008, the association had 4,000 members.

With the inauguration of the presidency of conservative Mahmoud Ahmadinejad, the association faced systematic harassment from government authorities, which culminated in its closure by the government in August 2009.

The association is a full member of the International Federation of Journalists.

== Ahmadinejad presidency ==
Ahmadinejad's crackdown on Iranian civil society brought the association into "open conflict" with his government. In August 2006, pro-government journalists unsuccessfully attempted to take control of the organization. On June 24, 2008, labor minister Mohammad Jahromi wrote a letter to the association, threatening to dissolve the "illegal" group. In response, Reporters Without Borders said, "This is yet another attempt by the Iranian authorities to silence those who defend free expression in Iran."

In aftermath of the disputed June 2009 Iranian presidential election, when protesters took to the streets to voice their discontent with the results, a number of journalists affiliated with the association were arrested. On June 20, authorities arrested the head of the association, Ali Mazroui. On July 3, 2009, Issa Saharkhiz, a founding member of the association, was arrested.

On August 5, 2009, the association shut down following a raid by security forces. The International Federation of Journalists condemned the closure as part of a "campaign of intimidation" against the media and said that "Iran must not make journalists scapegoats for its political troubles."

== Rouhani presidency ==
In response to a question about the Association of Iranian Journalists in his first press conference as president-elect on June 17, 2013, Hassan Rouhani said, "I believe that not only that association but all associations should be revived legally because these organizations are the best tools to manage the issues of society and the management of social issues must be carried out through these very professional and trade associations and groups. I will put my efforts into this."

In conflict with the president's pledge, however, Iranian judiciary spokesman Gholam-Hossein Ejhei said in October 2013 that the association would remain closed.
