= Iranian Literature Olympiad =

Iranian competition

The Iranian Literature Olympiad (Persian: المپیاد ادبی ایران) is an annual multi-stage competition in Iran, held for high school students specializing in Persian literature. It was established in 1987. The Literary Olympiad is organized on a regional scale, with the participation of Persian-speaking students from countries such as Iran, Afghanistan, Tajikistan, Pakistan, and Armenia.

Winners of the national gold medal are granted the privilege of university admission without taking the national entrance examination, provided that they have obtained their high school diploma and completed the pre-university course. They may then pursue higher education in their chosen field and university according to their respective academic group.

However, the top students of the Literature Olympiad are only eligible for admission in the field of Persian Language and Literature at the university of their choice.
