= Hamidreza Jalaeipour =

Iranian sociologist and journalist

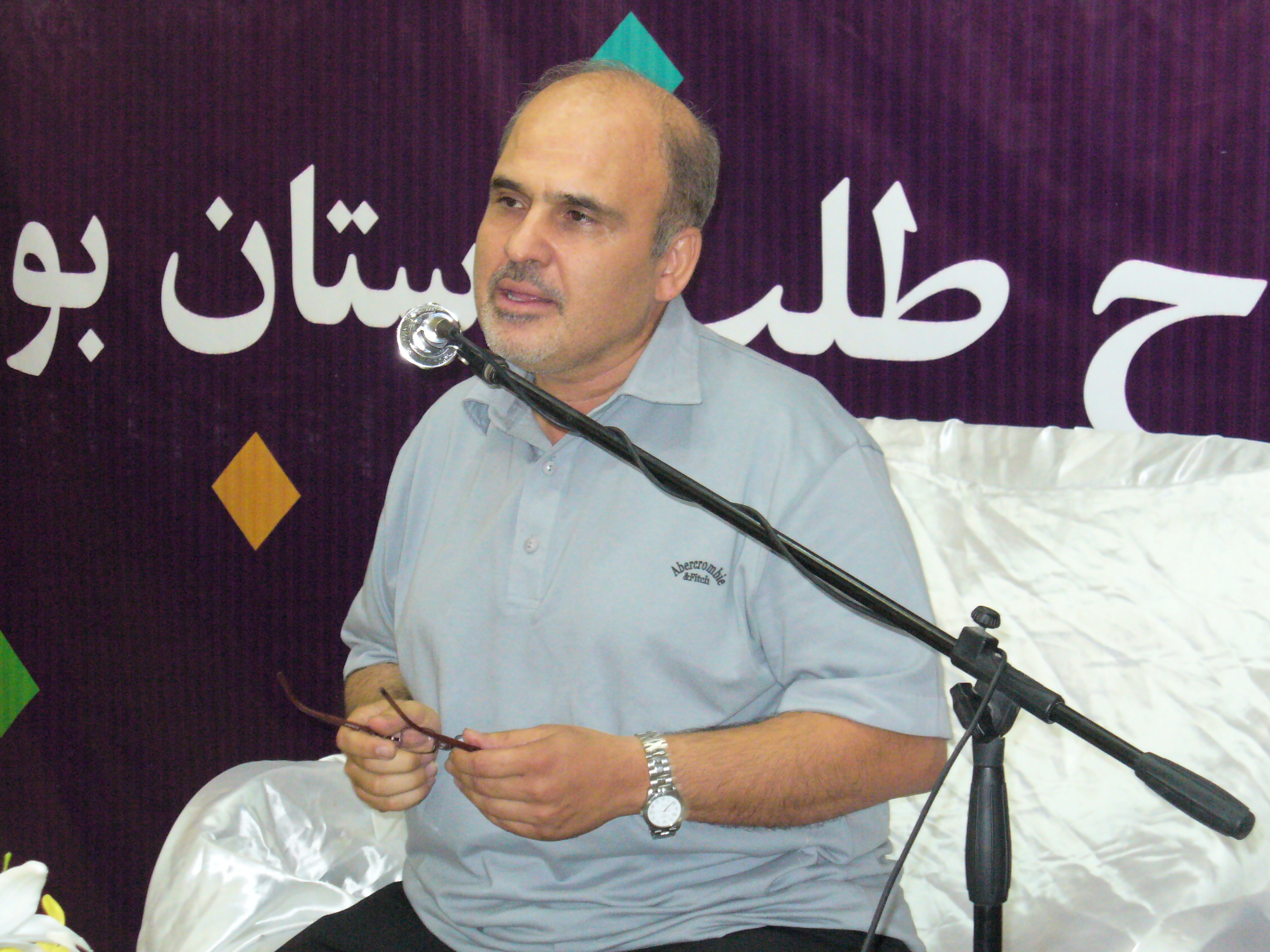
- Born: 1957 (age 68–69)
- Education: Royal Holloway, University of London
- Children: Mohammadreza Jalaeipour
- Scientific career
- Fields: Sociology
- Workplaces: University of Tehran
- Thesis: The Iranian revolution : mass mobilization and its continuity during 1976-96 (1997)
- Doctoral advisor: Michael Saward, Vanessa Martin

Hamidreza Jalaeipour (Persian: حمیدرضا جلایی‌پور; born 1957) is an Iranian sociologist and journalist, member of the Central Council of the Iran participation front, assistant professor in the department of sociology at the University of Tehran and one of the main members of the Iranian Sociological Association. He was the manager of Jame'ee and Nosazi newspapers and as well as the Chairman of the policy-making Council at Neshat newspaper.

== Biography ==
During the Islamic revolution, he was an active member of the Islamic Society at the universities.

He received his bachelor's and master's degrees in sociology at the University of Tehran with a privileged ranking in the year 1366 to 1371. He has a PhD in political sociology from the Royal Holloway, University of London in 1997.

He is the former director and publisher of Jameah and Nosazi newspapers. Before that, he was the governor of Naghadeh for four years and a half as well as the governor of Mahabad for four years and a half and held the position of Deputy Governor of Kurdistan for about four years. In 1382 (2003), he was honored as an exemplary professor of sociology, Faculty of Social Sciences. At present, he is an associate professor in the department of sociology at the University of Tehran and a member of the Central Council of the Iran participation front. He was also the publisher of Tus, Asr-e Azadegan and Neshat. He is considered as one of the main members of Iranian Sociological Association.

== Accusations ==
Several Journalists have accused Jalaeipour for being responsible for execution of 59 political prisoners in Kurdish region in Iran while he was a governor in Naghde in 1984.

In 1999, during his speech, when someone asked about these executions, he defended himself and said : "Those 59 prisoners were part of armed groups, and they were convicted to death in a trial"

== Works and publications ==
His main areas of research interest are political sociology and political movements in Iran.

The books written by him include:

- "Judge Mohammad: Kurdistan in the Years 1320-1324" (1369)
- "Kurdistan: The Reasons of its Crisis Continuity" (1371)
- "After the 2nd of Khordad: about reform movements 1376-1378" (1378)
- "The hidden state: about reform movements: about 80-1999" (2000)
- "Sociology of social movements" (1381)
- "The reform against reform" (2003)

== See also ==
- Mohammadreza Jalaeipour
