= Kamāl ud-Dīn Behzād =

Persian artist (c. 1455/1460 – 1535)

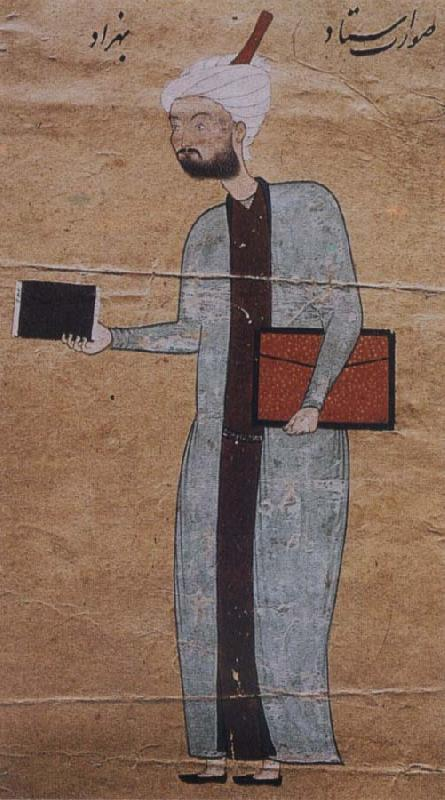
- Depiction of Behzad, from Shah Tahmasp's album
- Born: Between 1455 and 1460; Herat, Timurid Empire
- Died: 1535; Herat, Safavid Iran
- Resting place: Tomb of Two Kamals
- Other name: Behzad Heravi
- Occupation: Painter
- Era: Medieval period, Late Timurid, Early Safavid Iran
- Notable work: Portraits of Jami, Sultan Husayn Mirza Bayqara, Ali-Shir Nava'i, Ismail I

Kamāl ud-Dīn Behzād (c. 1455/1460 – 1535), also known as Kamal al-din Bihzad or Kamaleddin Behzād (Persian: کمال‌الدین بهزاد), was a Persian painter and head of the royal ateliers in Herat and Tabriz during the late Timurid and early Safavid eras. He is regarded as marking the highpoint of the great tradition of Islamic miniature painting. He was well known for his very prominent role as kitābdār (the chairman of a library) in the Herat Academy as well as his position in the Royal Library in the city of Herat. His art is unique in that it includes the common geometric attributes of Persian painting, while also inserting his own style, such as vast empty spaces to which the subject of the painting dances around. His art includes masterful use of value and individuality of character, with one of his most famous pieces being "The Seduction of Yusuf" from Sa'di's Bustan of 1488. Behzād's fame and renown in his lifetime inspired many during, and after, his life to copy his style and works due to the wide praise they received. Due to the great number of copies and difficulty with tracing origin of works, proper attribution remains a subject of much research.

== Biography ==
Behzād's exact year of birth is unknown, and according to different sources, it varies from 1455 to 1460. He was born and lived most of his life in Herat, a city in modern-day western Afghanistan and an important center of trade and the Timurid Empire's cultural and economic capital.

Not much is known of Behzad's childhood, but according to the author Qadi Ahmad, Behzād was orphaned at an early age and raised by the prominent painter and calligrapher Mirak Naqqash, a director of the Timurid royal library.

Behzād was also a protégé of Mir Ali-Shir Nava'i, a vizier, poet, and humanist, and the in the court of Herat during the reign of Timurid Sultan Husayn Bayqara (ruled 1469–1506).

In several manuscripts issued in the 1480s in the Sultan Hussein Bayqarah's kitabkhana (library), Behzad's participation is seen, which evidences his work in the court in the period. In 1486, with a decree of Sultan Hussein Bayqarah, Behzād was appointed head of the royal ateliers in Herat and succeeded Mirak Naqqash. Under his leadership, the academy reached its greatest period.

In 1506, Sultan Hussein Bayqarah died, and a month after his death, Herat was captured by the troops of the Bukhara Khanate, led by Mohammed Shaybani Khan. Some researchers believe that between 1507 and 1510, Behzād was in Bukhara, as he followed Shaybani Khan and other artists from Herat (although Babur reports that he was in Herat during those years).

Behzad's fame reached its zenith during this period. A fable states that during the Battle of Chaldiran in 1514, in which the Ottoman Turks defeated the Iranian army, Shah Ismail I hid Behzād in a cave as a treasure.

In 1522, Behzād was employed by Shah Ismail I in Tabriz (the capital of the new Safavid Empire), where, as director of the royal atelier, he had a decisive impact on the development of later Safavid painting. According to Muhammad Khwandamir, Shah Ismail I employed Behzād with a decree in which he described the painter as "...[a] miracle of our century, a model for painters and an example for goldsmiths, master Kemal-od-Din Behzad, who with his brush shamed Mani and humiliated the pages of Arzhang with his draftsman's pencil ...".

In 1524, Shah Ismail suddenly died. Behzad's later work is usually associated with the name of Shah Ismail's son, Shah Tahmasp I (ruled 1524–1576). Behzād continued to serve in the Shah's workshop until his death in 1535.

Behzad's tomb is located in Herat, beneath Kôh-i Mukhtâr ("Chosen Hill").

== Career and style ==
Behzād is the most famous of Persian miniature painters, though he is more accurately understood as the director of a workshop (or kitabkhāna) producing manuscript illuminations in a style he conceived. In 1486, Behzād became the head of the Herat Academy under the support of Sultan Ḥusayn Bayqarah. He left that position in 1506, at the end of Bayqarah's reign. In 1522, Behzād moved to the city of Tabriz, following Tahmasp, son of Shah Ismail I, who had been named governor of Herat in 1514. It was in this city where he became the head of the Safavid royal library. He worked there until his death in around 1536.

Persian painting of the period frequently uses an arrangement of geometric architectural elements as the structural or compositional context in which the figures are arranged.

Behzād uses landscape and geometric styles in his compositions. His work includes unpatterned areas around which figures are positioned. The gestures of figures and objects are arranged to direct the observer's focus across the picture plane.

He uses value (dark-light contrast) more emphatically, and skillfully than other medieval miniaturists. Another quality common to his work is narrative playfulness: the almost hidden eye and partial face of Bahram as he peers out the blinds to watch the frolicking girls in the pool below, the upright goat that looks like a demon along the edge of the horizon in a story about an old woman confronting the sins of Sanjar, the amazing cosmopolitan variety of humans working on the wall in the sample image.

This surprising individuality of character and narrative creativity are some qualities that distinguish Bezhad's works and that match their literary intent. Behzād also uses Sufi symbolism and symbolic colour to convey meaning. He introduced greater naturalism to Persian painting, particularly in the depiction of more individualised figures and the use of realistic gestures and expressions.

Behzad's most famous works include "The Seduction of Yusuf" from Sa'di's Bustan of 1488, and paintings from the British Library's Nizami manuscript of 1494–95 – particularly scenes from Layla and Majnun and the Haft Paykar (see accompanying image). The attribution of specific paintings to Behzād himself is often problematic (and, many academics would now argue, unimportant), but the majority of works commonly attributed to him date from 1488 to 1495.

"The Seduction of Yusuf", a tale found in both the Bible and the Qur’an, describes a series of interactions between Joseph and Zulaykha, the wife of Potiphar. This story had previously appeared in Sadi's Bustan, written 200 years earlier. The mystical poet Jami, who served in Husayn Bayqara’s court, also narrated the events in details. The painting features both of their contributions; two couplets from Jami's poetry are inscribed in white on blue around the painting's central arch, while Sadi's poem is etched in the cream-colored panels at the top, middle, and bottom of the page. Jami claims that the narrative is set in a place that Zulaykha built and embellished with sensual portraits of herself and Yusuf. Doors were locked as she escorted the apprehensive Yusuf from room to room. Here one observes architecture as a means of dividing space, creating the possibility of reading space as time. The duration of the viewer's experience of the image is emphasized in this composition. The variety of places present, however, defines the piece of art or architecture. The continuity of these spatial zones, each of which enters into the distinctive atmosphere of each monument is of utmost importance. The narrative continues when Zulaykha and Yusuf enter the innermost chamber. He escapes her hands as she throws herself at him. The seven locked doors suddenly open, and help him avoid being seduced by her. The most dramatic part of the story is depicted in the picture by Bhizad, when the helpless Zulaykha reaches out to grab Yusuf. Once again, architecture serves as the medium for this effective visual narrative. The painter's decision to use a monoscenic composition and to make all regions visible to the eye allowed for the inclusion of the most possible narrative elements. If we contrast Jami's words with Bihzad's illustration, we can see that one is an allegory of the soul's quest for heavenly love and beauty, and the latter is an invitation to mystical contemplation. All of the stylistic features included help the artist communicate something. The magnificent palace is a representation of the material world; the seven rooms represent the seven climes; and Yusuf's beauty is a metaphor for that of God. Moreover, the absence of a witness in the painting has the purpose of showing Yusuf's devotion to God. He could have yielded to Zulaykha's fervor, but he realized that God was all-seeing and all-knowing. This image surpasses both the literal standards and the prevalent mystical elements in modern literature and society.

== Legacy ==
One of Behzād's lasting influences stems from his proficient depiction of humans and other organic motifs, bringing new depths to his painting's narratives and characters. Behzād's human figures were less stiff in their stances and more dynamic in their movements, creating a greater sense of energy and emotions to the paintings. Likewise, Behzād utilized a method of painting that relied upon geometric formulas and a flattening of the visual plane to present the whole narrative in one painting and ensure the viewer's eyes would move across the entire painting.

Behzād's technical mastery was coupled by a keen artistic eye as he was able to create a visually complex but compelling scene. The fluidity of Behzād's compositions reflect his capacity to create a realistic scene by reducing it to the most important elements. It is not to say that Behzād created unrefined works, rather, what he did choose to include was masterfully rendered and ripe with emotion and a masterful control of the brush and color.

Behzād's reputation was well-founded within his own lifetime with nearby rulers, such as the Mughal emperors, being willing to pay large sums for his paintings further adding to his fame and legacy. With such a prestigious Behzād came to be a central figure to the Herat school of painting, eventually becoming the head of the Herat academy in 1486 and leaving in 1506. As the head of the Herat academy he held large influence over the students, influencing the styles and techniques of future generations of Persian painters. Behzād's fame and artistic renown would inspire imitation or other artists to learn from his paintings as well as more formally Behzād had large authority over the production of manuscripts, and thus their appearance.

Within contemporary times much of the scholarly focus has been upon ensuring correct attribution to Behzād as there are concerns that some previously attributed works may not be from Behzād. With certain works attribution can be relatively confident from properly dated and placed signatures, but others were attributed in the 16th century and only contain stylistic similarities to Behzād's works. Thus, raising questions of whether some works are skillful imitations, or if they are genuine.

== Behzād in literature ==
Behzād is mentioned throughout Orhan Pamuk's novel, My Name is Red, in which a workshop of Ottoman miniaturists regards him as one of the greatest Persian miniaturists.

== Gallery ==
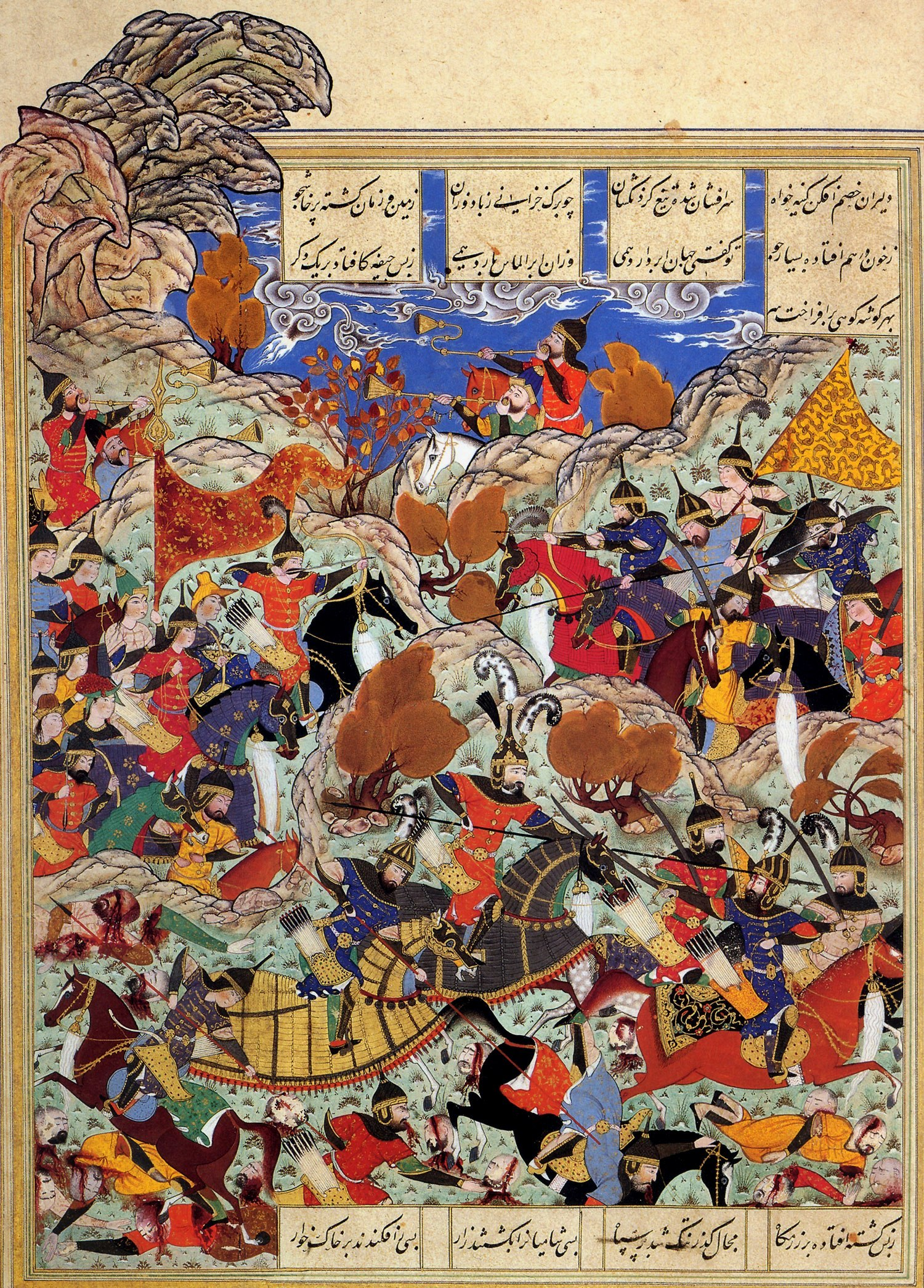
Battleground of Timur and the Mamluk Sultan of Egypt.

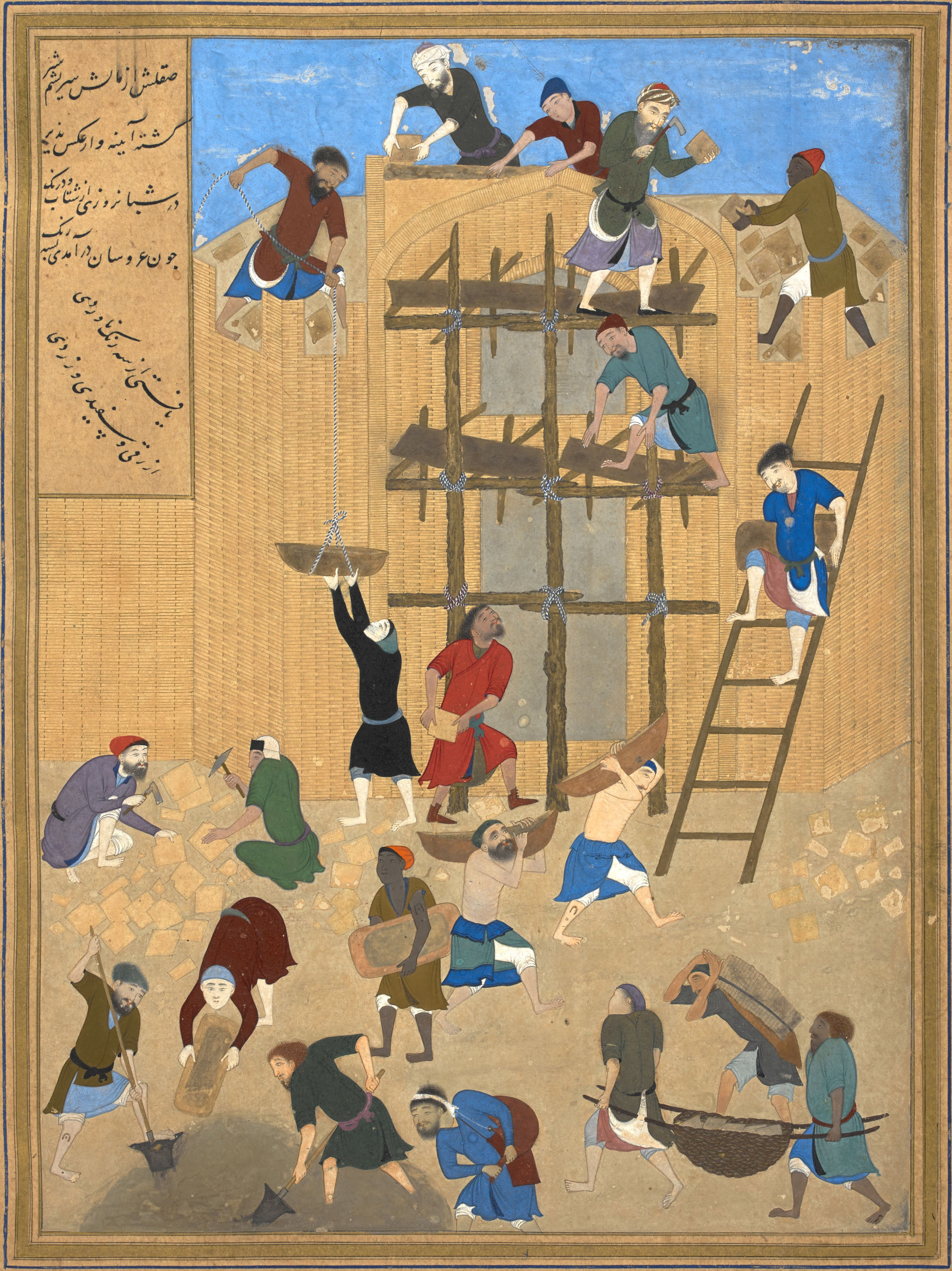
The construction of Khawarnaq castle (Arabic الخورنق) in al-Hira, c. 1494-1495 C.E.

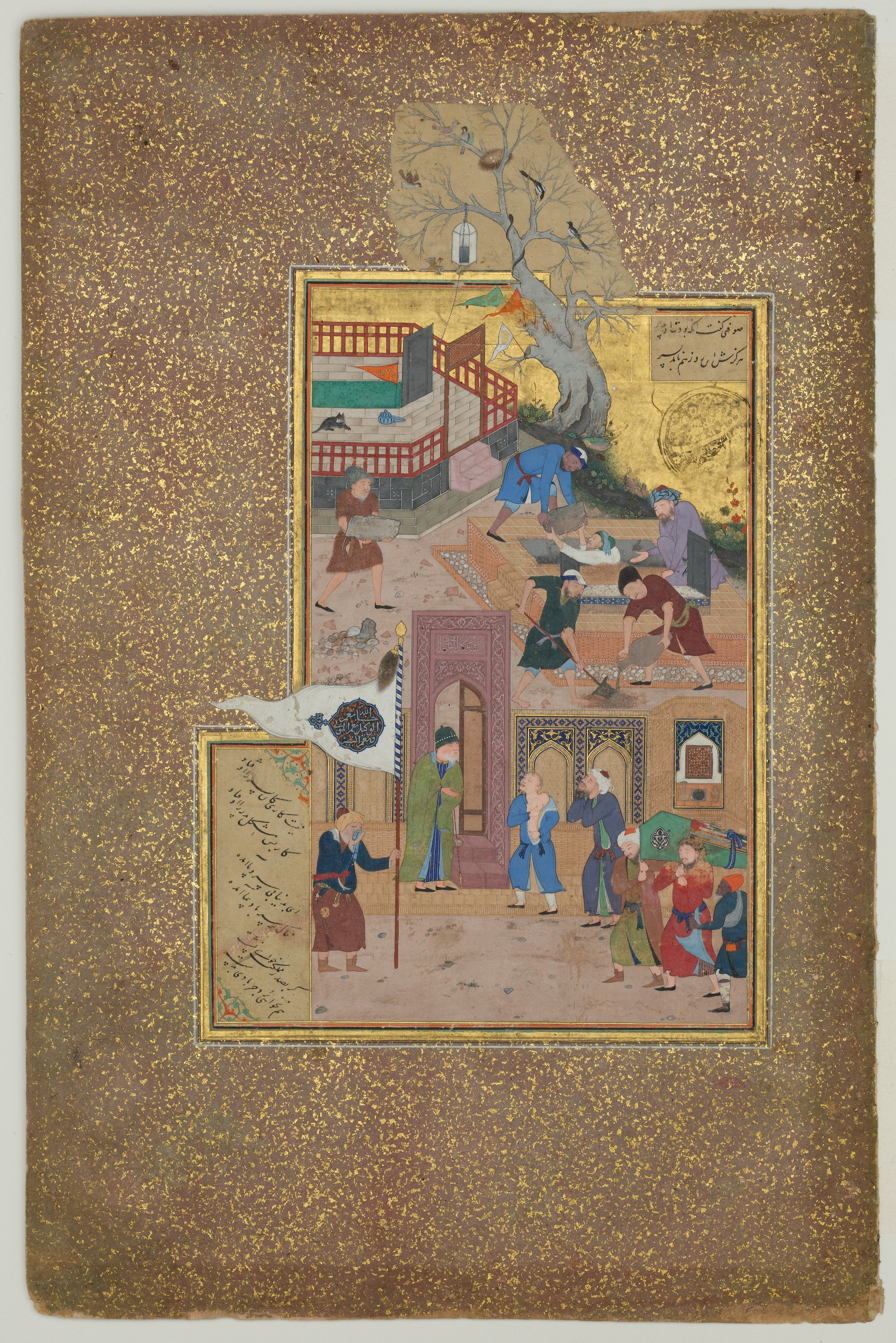
A miniature painting by Bihzad illustrating the funeral of the elderly Attar of Nishapur after he was held captive and killed by a Mongol invader.

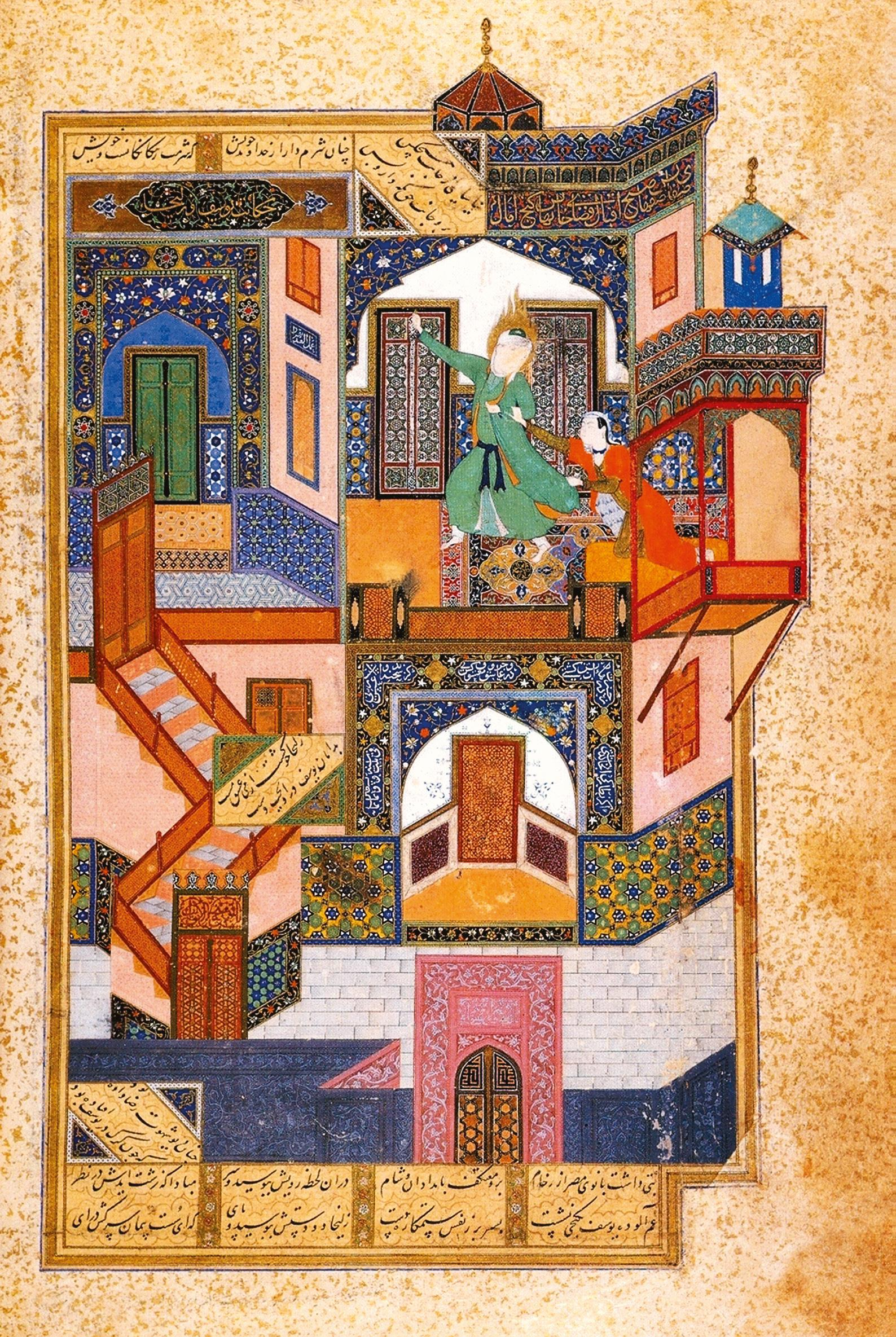
Yusef and Zuleykha

A miniature painting from the Iskandarnama of Nizami

A miniature painting from the Iskandarnama

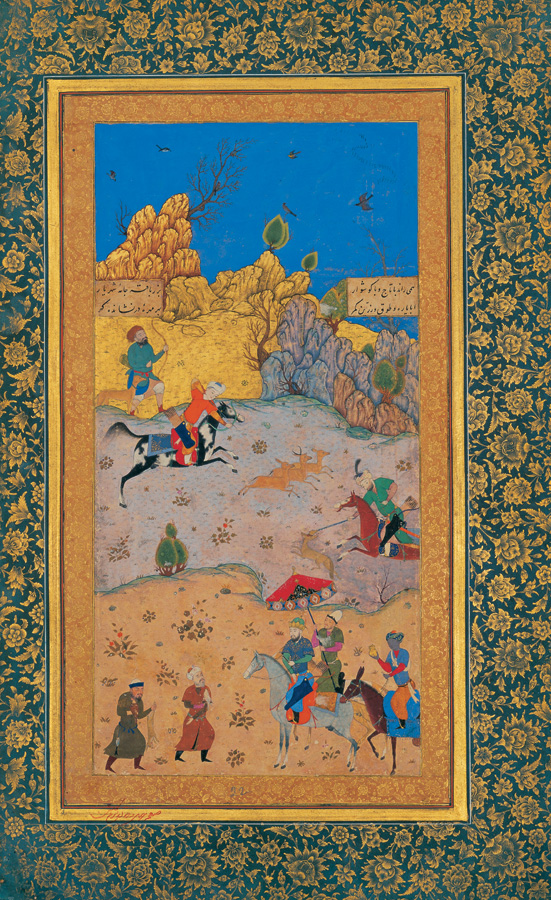
The hunting ground.

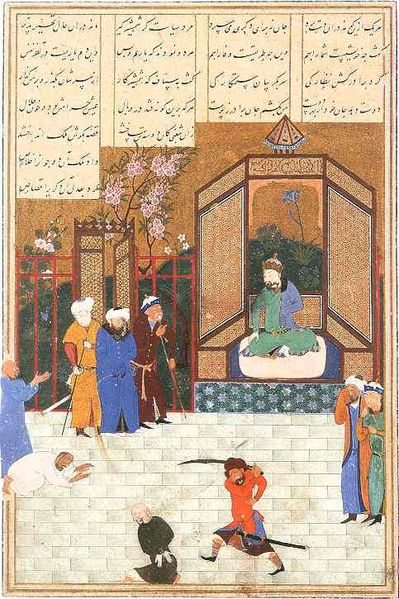
Beheading of a King

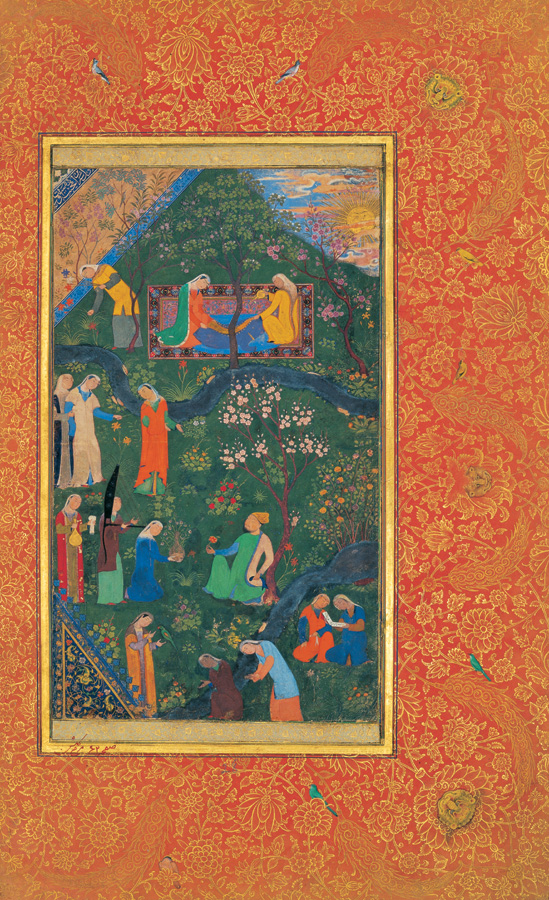
Sultan Hussein

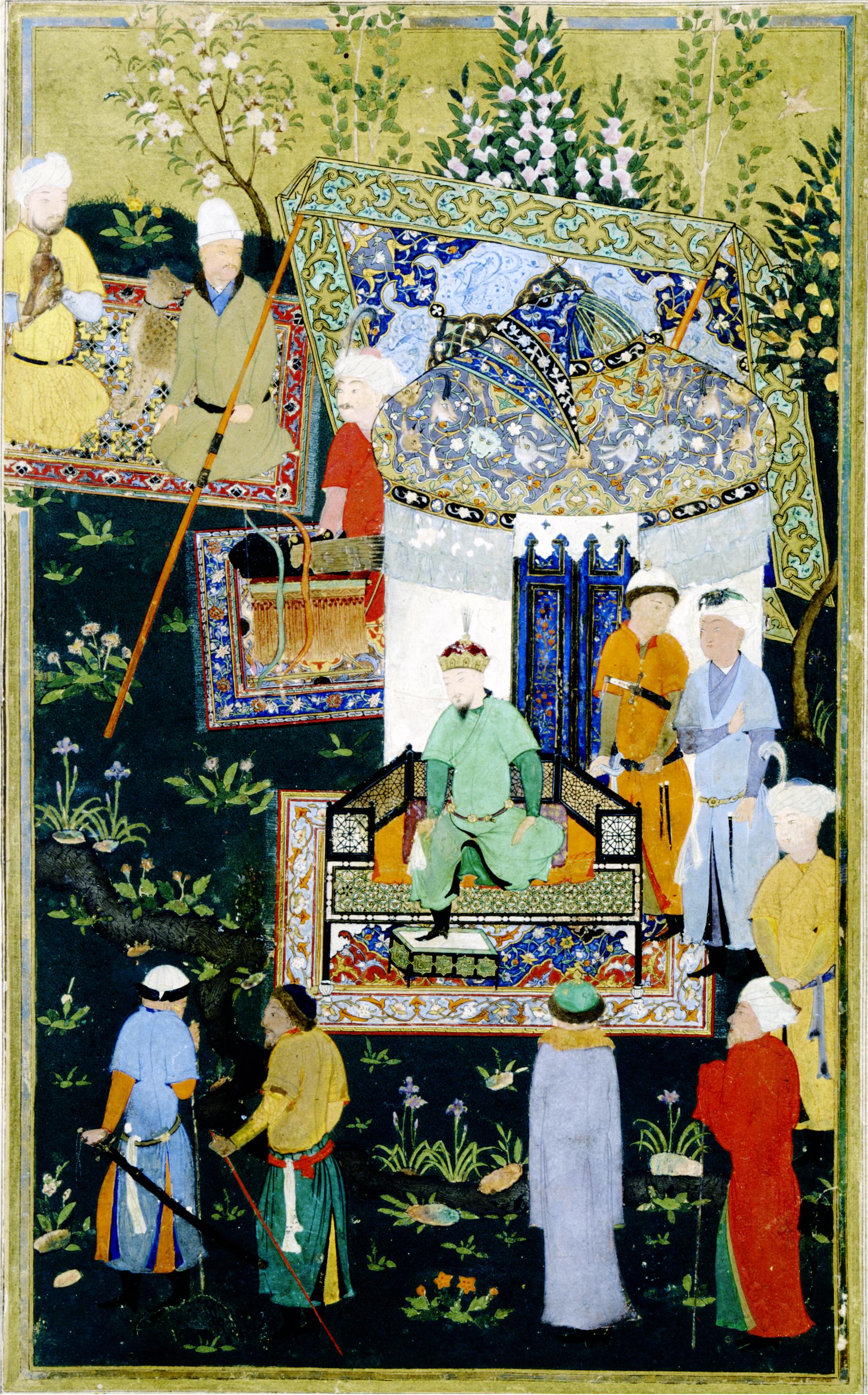
Timur granting audience on the occasion of his accession

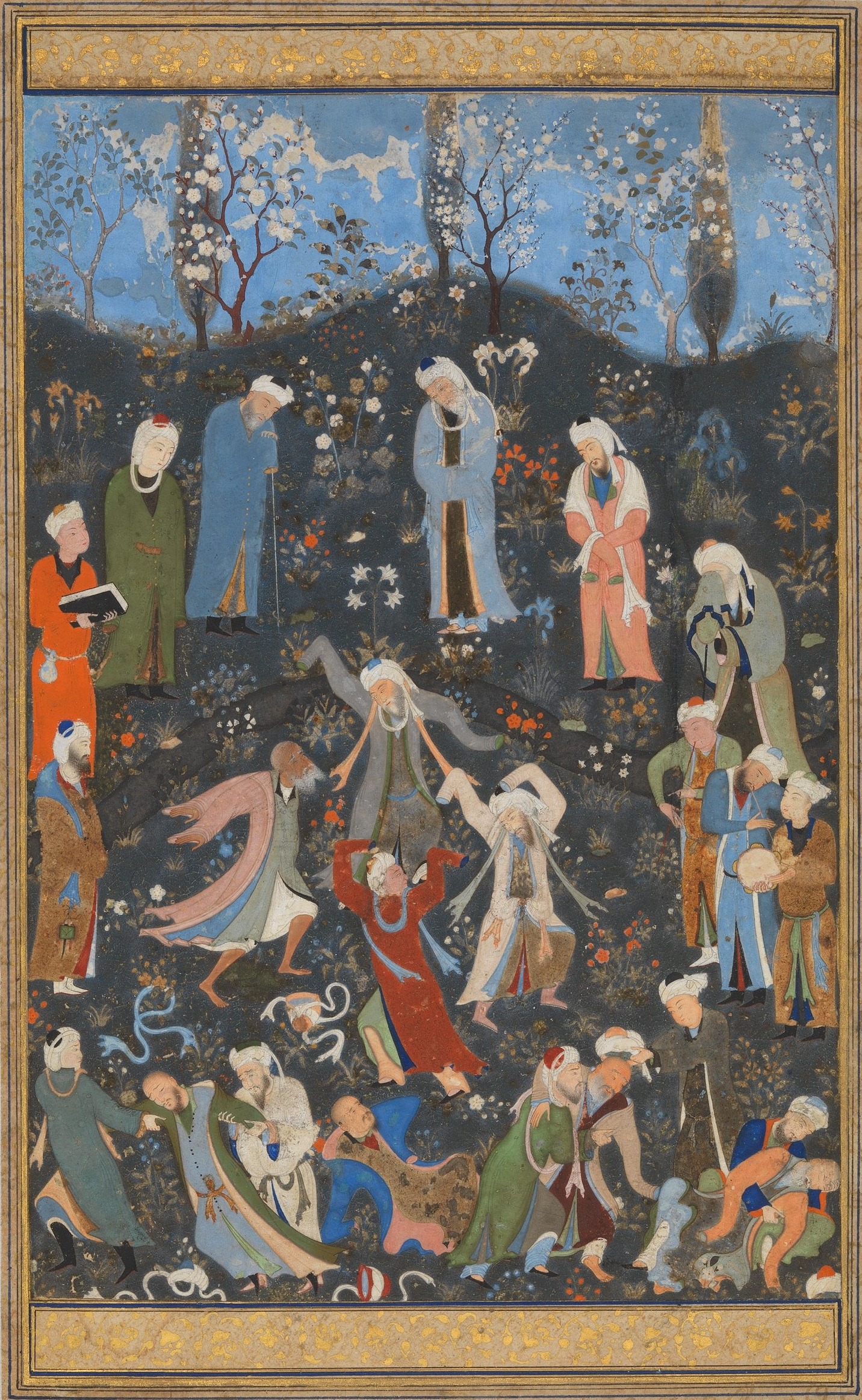
Dancing dervishes (c. 1480/1490)

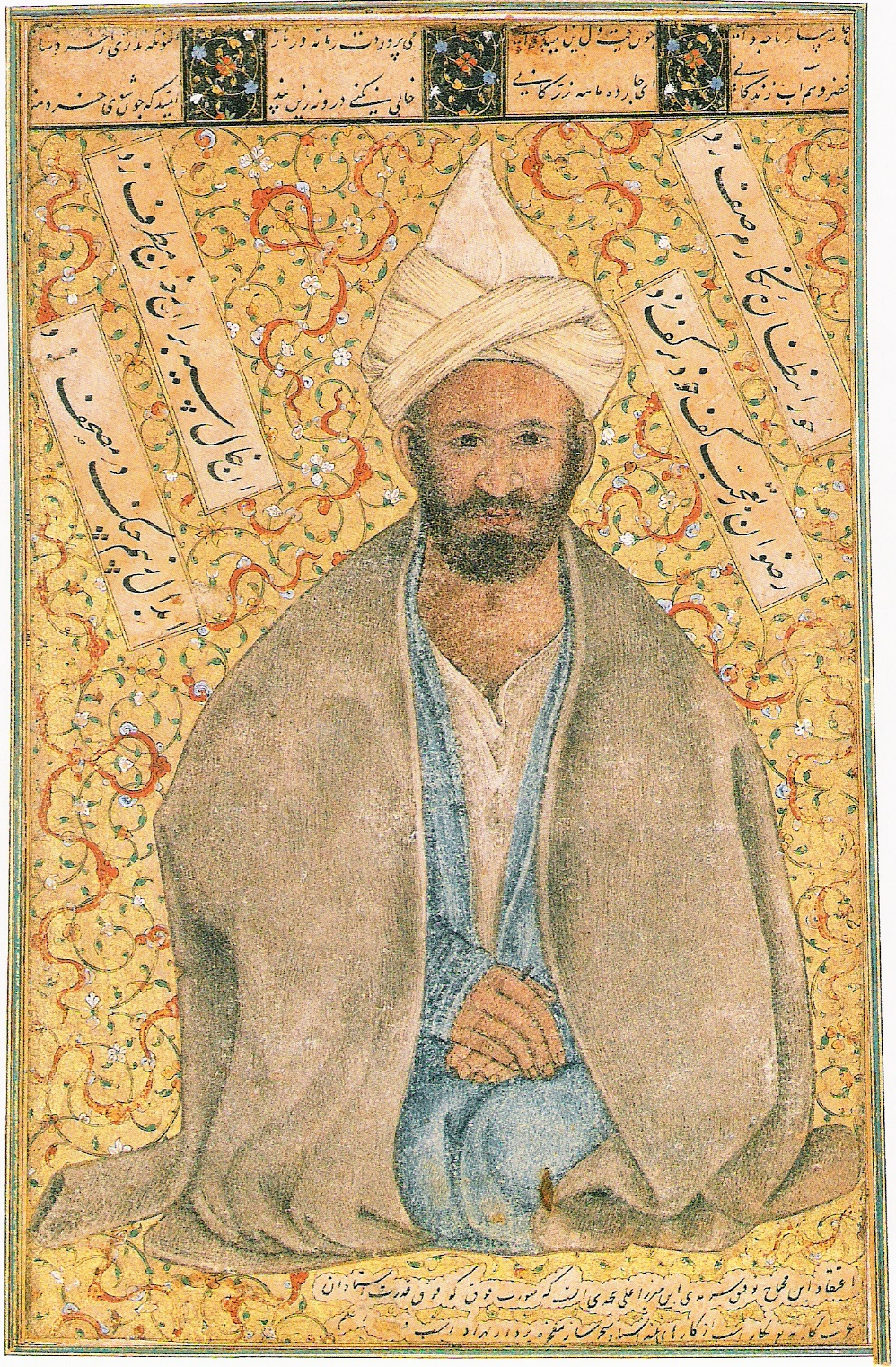
Portrait of a dervish

== See also ==
- Persian miniature
- List of Persian painters
- Begzada
