= Mohammadreza Jalaeipour =

Iranian sociologist and political activist

- Persian: محمدرضا جلایی‌پور
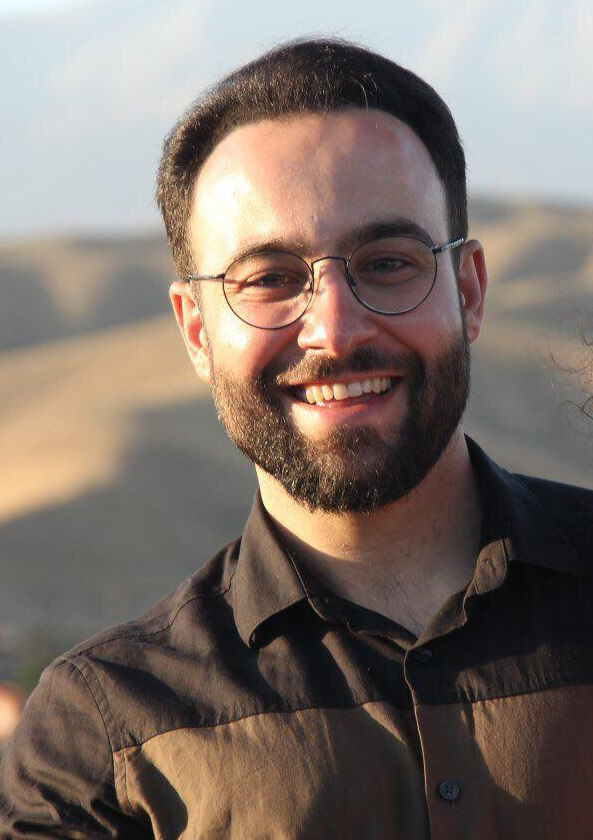
- Born: 1982 (age 43–44)
- Education: University of Tehran; London School of Economics; St Antony's College, Oxford
- Father: Hamidreza Jalaeipour
- Scientific career
- Fields: Sociology
- Workplaces: Princeton University; Harvard University
- Thesis: Clerical Authority in Contemporary Shi‘i Islam: A Study of Marja‘iyya in Qom (TBA)
- Doctoral advisor: Homa Katouzian

Mohammadreza Jalaeipour (Persian: محمدرضا جلایی‌پور, born 1982) is an Iranian sociologist and political activist.

== Life ==
He is the son of Hamidreza Jalaeipour. Mohammadreza Jalaeipour has been a PhD student at St Antony's College, University of Oxford.

He was a founder of pro-reformist Third Wave campaign in Iranian presidential election, 2009.

== Detentions ==
Jalaeipour has been detained on a number of occasions by the Iranian authorities. While still a student at Oxford University in June 2009 he was prevented from returning to England after visiting Iran, without his family knowing where he was taken. He was arrested again in June 2010 in Tehran and kept in solitary confinement before being transferred to a prison in Mashhad. He was released in August 2010 with bail of three billion rials, but was never charged. In April 2018 he was arrested in Iran and held without charge for 77 days.

== Awards and honors ==
- Placed 1st in Iranian University Entrance Exam (2003)
- Gold medal. Iranian Literature Olympiad (2002)
