= Jame'eh =

Daily newspaper in Iran (February 1998–June 1998)

- Type: Daily newspaper
- Founded: 5 February 1998
- Ceased publication: June 1998
- Political alignment: Reformist
- Language: Persian
- Headquarters: Tehran
- Country: Iran

Jame'eh (Persian: جامعه, meaning "Society") was a Persian-language reformist daily newspaper published in Tehran, Iran, in 1998. It began publication in February, during the first presidency of Mohammad Khatami. Hamid Reza Jalaeipour served as its publisher, and Mashallah Shamsolvaezin was its editor-in-chief. The newspaper was banned in July 1998 and was succeeded by Tous.

== History and editorial approach ==
Jame'eh emerged during the expansion of the reformist press following Khatami's election. It attracted a substantial readership within its first few months. Its coverage included political, social and cultural issues, and it provided space for debate among religious and secular thinkers.

The newspaper's critical reporting brought it into conflict with several state institutions. These included the Islamic Revolutionary Guard Corps, the prisons administration and the judiciary.

== Closure and successor ==
Legal proceedings against Jame'eh followed complaints concerning its reporting on Revolutionary Guards commander Yahya Rahim Safavi, prison conditions and other matters. The allegations included publishing false information and insulting officials.

The newspaper was banned in July 1998. Shortly after its closure, the same editorial team began publishing Tous, which carried similar content under a different title. Tous was itself closed in September 1998.
