= List of business newspapers =

The following is a list of daily business newspapers, divided by country and region.

== International ==
- Financial Times
- The Wall Street Journal

== Top circulation ==
- Nihon Keizai Shimbun, Japan - 4,635,000
- Financial Times, United Kingdom - 2,205,000
- The Wall Street Journal, United States - 2,107,000
- Business Standard, India - 817,000
- The Economic Times, India - 795,940
- Il Sole 24 Ore, Italy - 334,076
- Mint, India - 226,000
- Challenges, France - 183,233
- Handelsblatt, Germany - 148,319
- Les Échos, France - 120,546
- The Australian Financial Review, Australia - 64,861

== Belarus ==
- Belorusy i rynok

== Czech Republic ==
- Hospodářské noviny
- E15

== Estonia ==
- Äripäev (Business Day)

== Finland ==
- Kauppalehti (Business Newspaper)

== France ==
- Le Nouvel Économiste (with an arrangement for article-sharing with Financial Times, London and The Economist.)
- Les Échos

== Germany ==
- Handelsblatt

== Hong Kong ==
- Hong Kong Economic Journal
- Hong Kong Economic Times
- South China Morning Post
- The Standard

== India ==
- Business Standard
- The Economic Times
- Financial Chronicle
- Financial Express
- The Hindu Business Line
- Mint

== Indonesia ==
- Bisnis Indonesia
- Investor Daily
- Kontan

== Iran ==
- Donya-e-Eqtesad
- Financial Tribune
- Tejarat-e-Farda

== Ireland ==
- Business Post
- The Currency

== Israel ==
- Calcalist
- Globes
- ICE (Israel) (ice.co.il)
- TheMarker

== Italy ==
- Il Sole 24 Ore
- Italia Oggi
- MF Milano Finanza

== Japan ==
- Nihon Keizai Shimbun

== Kenya ==
- Business Daily

== Netherlands ==
- Het Financieele Dagblad - 85,000

== Norway ==
- Dagens Næringsliv
- Finansavisen

== Pakistan ==
- Business Recorder

== Philippines ==
- BusinessWorld
- BusinessMirror
- Chinese Commercial News
- Malaya Business Insight

== Portugal ==
- Jornal de Negócios

== Romania ==
- Bursa
- Ziarul financiar

== Russia ==
- Kommersant
- The Moscow Times
- RBC Daily
- Vedomosti

== Serbia ==
- Poslovni dnevnik

== Singapore ==
- Business Times

== South Africa ==
- Business Day

== Spain ==
- Expansión
- Cinco Días

== Sweden ==
- Dagens Industri

== Ukraine ==
- Delovaya Stolitsa

== United Arab Emirates ==
- Arabian Business
- Business24-7
- Gulf Business
- Zawya

== United Kingdom ==
- City A.M.
- The Economist
- Financial Times

== United States ==
- American City Business Journals
- Crain's Chicago Business
- Finance & Commerce
- Inside Business
- Investor's Business Daily
- The Journal of Commerce
- Miami Today
- The Wall Street Journal
