= Iran newspaper cockroach cartoon controversy =

2006 controversy over a cartoon in Iran

Cartoon that started the controversy. The boy tries to address the cockroach using different forms of soosk (the Persian word for 'cockroach') and in one of the cartoons it answers Namana? (Azerbaijani word for 'what'.)

The Iran newspaper cockroach cartoon controversy occurred in response to a cartoon drawn by cartoonist Mana Neyestani and published in the Iranian Friday-magazine Iran-e-jomee on 12 May 2006.

The cartoon describes nine methods of dealing with cockroaches by depicting a Persian-speaking child and a cockroach. During the first method, when the cockroach does not understand him, the child decides to talk to the cockroach in "cockroach language", but the cockroach replies by saying "Namana?" ('what' in the Azerbaijani language). The cartoon has been interpreted by people as an insult to Iranian Azerbaijanis.

== Contents of the article ==
The article which the cartoons accompany is entitled "How to Stop the Cockroaches from Making Us into Cockroaches?". It is a satirical article in a children's weekly newspaper. The cartoon depicts nine methods of dealing with cockroaches including dialogue, oppression, elimination, population control, and violence. The text of the paragraph in the first image describes the first method, translated as follows:

"First Method: Dialogue"

Some people believe that one should not resort to violence as an initial step, because that will just take all the fun out of the process. So we must first try to come to the table like civilized people and have a dialogue with the cockroaches. But the problem is that a cockroach cannot understand human language [i.e., reasoned argument]. And cockroach grammar is so difficult—nobody has yet discovered which of their verbs end in "ing"—that 80% of the cockroaches themselves do not know it and prefer to speak in other languages. When even the cockroaches do not understand their own language, how could you possibly understand it?! This is precisely why negotiations hit a dead-end and the sweet methodology of violence becomes a necessity!

The cockroach also speaks in Persian in the comic.

The child proceeds to speak in "cockroach language" to the cockroach, but the cockroach does not understand him and replies "Namana?" ('what'). Namana is originally an Azerbaijani-Turkic word, but is also sometimes used in Persian as a slang. In other sections of the article where the violence option is entertained, the cockroach speaks in Persian to the child.

The article's use of the keywords "dialogue" (Persian: گفتمان) and "violence" (Persian: خشونت ورزی), plus discussions about problems understanding the language of the "cockroaches", can be interpreted as tacit references to the reformist nomenclature in contrast to the language of the conservatives in Iran. The famous reformist motto "dialogue among civilizations", used by Iran's former president Mohammad Khatami, was a source of criticism among the intelligentsia, because they questioned how it could be possible to have such a dialogue between Iran and the western civilizations when it was not even possible to have a dialogue and mutual understanding between reformist and conservative Iranians.

== Aftermath ==
The publication of the cartoon caused controversy among Iranian Azerbaijanis for allegedly comparing them to cockroaches. It was deemed by some people as part of a long-standing chauvinistic attitude towards Iranian Azerbaijanis among parts of the Persian-speaking majority.

The controversy resulted in massive protests in May 2006 throughout the predominantly Azerbaijani-populated cities of Tabriz, Urmia, Ardabil, Zanjan, and Naghadeh, as well as a number of smaller towns. After violent reactions from the Iranian police, the initially peaceful protests turned violent in most cases, with protesters throwing stones and damaging government-related properties. Amnesty International claims that "hundreds, if not thousands, were arrested and tens of Azerbaijani-Turks reportedly shot and killed by the security forces", while the Iranian authorities claim that 330 people were arrested during the protests, and only four demonstrators were killed.

The Iranian government promptly responded to the events by temporarily shutting down the Iran newspaper, arresting the cartoonist Mana Neyestani, who is himself an ethnic Azeri, and the editor-in-chief of the newspaper, Mehrdad Ghasemfar. It further accused outside forces of "playing the nationalistic card".

== Allegations of foreign interference ==
Emad Afrough, head of the Majlis Cultural Commission at the time, said that pan-Turkists were involved in creating the tensions. Other members of the Iranian government blamed it on the United States, Israel, and the United Kingdom, suspecting the incitement of ethnic strife in Iran. It was alleged that the United States is conducting covert operations in Iran and is allied with Iran's neighbor, the Republic of Azerbaijan. Abbas Maleki, a senior research fellow at Harvard University and former deputy foreign minister of Iran, supported this thesis, stating:

I think that when President Bush says all options are on the table, the destabilization of Iran's ethnic provinces is one of them. Don't forget, Mr Mahmudali Chehregani, one of the pan-Turkist leaders agitating for a separatist Azeri agenda, was in Washington last year by invitation of the Defense Department.

Reuel Marc Gerecht, reportedly a former CIA operative, had stated in the early 1990s: "Accessible through Turkey and ex-Soviet Azerbaijan, eyed already by nationalists in Baku, more westward-looking than most [of] Iran, and economically going nowhere, Iran's richest agricultural province was an ideal CIA [covert action] theater."

One factor driving the protests was the separatist GünAz TV channel, which incited parts of the population to riots and agitation. According to Hürriyet newspaper, a Turkish state investigation found that the satellite channels being used to host GünAz were being rented by the American CIA, which resulted in the channel's banning from usage of Türksat satellites.

According to Touraj Atabaki, well-known expert on Iranian Azerbaijanis, there might be some truth behind the Iranian government's allegations of a foreign plot, yet the responsibility for the unrest lies first and foremost with the central government. Similarly, writer Iason Athanasiadis opines that "there is no hard evidence pointing toward the troubles as being anything but domestic".

== See also ==
- Anti-Azerbaijani sentiment
