= List of newspapers in Iran =

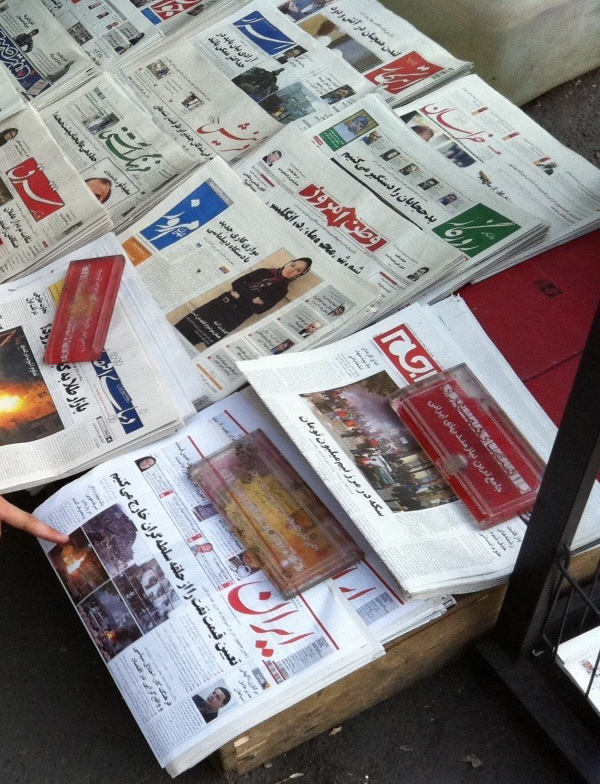
Newspapers, Tehran, 2011

The first Iranian newspapers appeared in the mid-19th century during the reign of Naser al-Din Shah. More specifically, the first newspaper in Iran, Kaghaz-e Akhbar (The Newspaper), was launched for the government by Mirza Saleh Shirazi in 1837. By 1907 (the era of the Persian Constitutional Revolution), there were 90 newspapers circulating in Iran.

In 1952 under Mohammad Musaddiq's government there were 300 newspapers, including twenty-five dailies. During the 1979 revolution the number of newspapers was 100, of which twenty-three were dailies.

As of 2000 there were 23 Persian dailies, three English dailies and one Arabic daily in the country. In the period between 2000 and 2004 a total of 85 newspapers were closed down in Iran.

== Iranian newspapers ==
Below is a list of newspapers published in Iran.

Title	Year est.	Language	Notes
Abrar		Persian	Economic, political, artistic, social and cultural newspapers
Alik (daily)	1931	Armenian	Economic, political, artistic, social and cultural newspapers
Abrar-e Varzeshi		Persian	Sports newspaper
Afarinesh		Persian	
Aftab Yazd	2000	Persian	Political, social, economic, events.
Aftab-e Emruz		Persian	political
Aftab-e Shargh		Persian	
Andisheh-ye-No		Persian	currently banned
Asia News	2001	Persian	Economic Newspaper
Asr-e Azadegan	1999	Persian	
Asr-e Maa	1991	Persian	political
Asrar		Persian	
Azad		Persian	
Atash	1946–1947	Persian	
Bahar	2000		
Donyaye eqtesad	2002	Persian	
Ebtekar		Persian	
Eftekhar		Persian	
Entekhab	1991	Persian	
Eqbal		Persian	
Esfahan-e Emrooz		Persian	
Etemad	2002	Persian	
Etemaad-e Melli		Persian	"Official newspaper of the National Trust Party"
Ettelaat	1926	English, Persian	"Centrist...Iran's oldest daily, moderate, a newspaper of record"
Fath		Persian	
Financial Tribune	2014	English	The only private newspaper in English and also the only non-Persian economic daily in Iran
Ghanoon	2012	Persian	
Gilan Emrouz		Persian	
Goalnewspaper	2005	Persian	Sport newspaper
Ham-Mihan	2000		
Hambastegi	2000	Persian	
Hamshahri	1992	Persian	"Centrist press...Owned by Tehran Municipality, it is one of the best-selling dailies with a circulation of about 350,000"
Hamvatan Salam		Persian	Meaning "Hello Compatriot"; since before 1995, still published as of August 2023
Hayat-e-No		Persian	currently banned
Hemmat	1981	Persian	
Iran	1995	Persian	"Government newspaper published by the Islamic Republic News Agency. The daily has a circulation of 100,000 and is popular among state officials"
Iran Daily		English	"Hardliner press...Pro-government"
Iran Star		Persian	Community, Cultural, artistic, sports, social
Iran Weekly Press Digest			
Iran-e Javan		Persian	Cultural, artistic, sports, social
Iran Front Page	2014	English	Translation of selected items and front pages of Iranian newspapers to English: politics, society, culture, science, business, art, sports
Iran-e Varzeshi		Persian	Sport newspaper
Jame-Jam	2002	Persian	"Owned by the Islamic Republic of Iran Broadcasting...hardliner"
Jamee-e Madani		Persian	
Jameah		Persian	currently banned
Javan		Persian	"Hardliner...Right-wing daily affiliated with the Revolutionary Guards"
Jomhouri Eslami	1979	Persian	"Hardliner...Closely linked to the Supreme Leader. The paper takes the line of adherence to Khomeini's ideals and has consistently taken a radical position on foreign policy issues and a conservative position on domestic and religious issues."
Jomhuriat		Persian	
Kalemeh Sabz			Associated with "Green Movement leader, Mir-Hossein Mousavi"
Kayhan	1943	English, Persian	"Hardliner...One of the country's oldest daily papers, run after the revolution by the office of the Supreme Leader, who appoints the editor-in-chief, currently Hossein Shariatmadari. Kayhan is state-funded and has a role comparable to "Pravda" under Stalin."
Kayhan Al Arabi	1943	Arabic	"Hardliner...One of the country's oldest daily papers, run after the revolution by the office of the Supreme Leader, who appoints the editor-in-chief, currently Hossein Shariatmadari. Kayhan is state-funded and has a role comparable to "Pravda" under Stalin."
Kelid	2013		
Khabar		Persian	
Khabar-e Jonub		Persian	
Khane Mellat		Persian	
Khorasan	1949	Persian	Political, social.
Khordad		Persian	
Khorshid	2008	Persian	
Kian		Persian	
navad 90 (varzeshi)		Persian	Sport
Neshat	1998	Persian	"Aligned with Iran’s reform movement...Neshat’s director and editor in chief were Latif Safari and Mashallah Shamsolvaezi"
Payam Ashna		Persian	the first newspaper of Alborz province
Payam Zaman		Persian	
Quds		Persian	
Resalat	1985	Persian	"Hardliner...Owned by the Resalat Foundation, which has strong links to the traditional bazaar merchants-conservative but in favor of a market economy. It reflects the views of the conservative Islamic Coalition Party and the Islamic Association of Engineers"
Ruydadiran (Ruydademrooz)		Persian	"Social and Economic newspapers. It is a popular daily and nationwide newspaper that is distributed in all provinces of Iran."
Salam	1991		
Sarmayeh		Persian	"Centrist...Economic paper run by a former head of the Tehran Stock Exchange, and shut down in October 2009"
Shargh	2003	Persian	"Pro-reform"
Sobh-eqtesad		Persian	
Taban		Persian	
Tehran Emrooz			"Centrist...Daily set up by a member of the Guardian Council, and close to Tehran Mayor Mohammad-Bager Ghalibaf"
Tehran Times	1979	English	"Hardliner...Pro-government"
Tous	1998	Persian	"Reformist daily...Published through the Jamee-Rooz publishing company...directed by Mohammad Sadeq Javadi-Hessar with Mashallah Shamsolvaezin as editor in chief." Currently banned
Vaghaye Etefaghyeh		Persian	
Al Vefagh	1997	Arabic	
Yas-e-no		Persian	
Zan	1998		

== See also ==
- International Rankings of Iran in Communication
- List of Iranian magazines
- Mass media of Iran
