= Iranian.com =

Online newspaper

- Website type: News
- Available in: English, Persian
- Owner: Saïd Amin (Iranian LLC)
- Website: www.iranian.com
- Registration: Optional
- Launched: July 1995; 31 years ago
- Current status: Active

Iranian.com is an online magazine of syndicated Iranian-related news. When Jahanshah Javid, the original owner, started the website in 1995, he called it The Iranian (after The New Yorker).

On April 24, 2012, Jahanshah Javid announced to his sponsors at PBS that he was pursuing a new venture, and that he had sold his remaining shares to his partner, entrepreneur Saïd Amin.

== See also ==
- Media of Iran
- List of Persian-language magazines
