= Yadollah Eslami =

Iranian journalist

Yadollah Eslami (Persian: یدالله اسلامی) was the editor-in-chief of Iranian newspaper Fath and former representative in Parliament. Fath was shut down in 2000 after it had published an interview with Hussein-Ali Montazeri, and in January 2001 Eslami was convicted of publishing lies and anti-state propaganda. Fath was considered as the replacement of Khordad newspaper. In February 2011, it was reported that Eslami was detained by security forces in Tehran due to "security reasons".
