= Kalameh Sabz =

Iranian newspaper

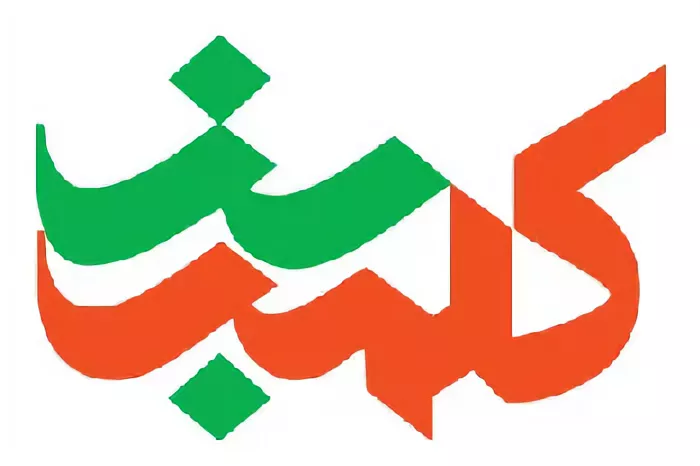

- 18 May 2009 issue of Kalameh Sabz
- Type: Daily newspaper
- Format: Broadsheet
- Owner: Mir-Hossein Mousavi
- Editor-in-chief: Alireza Hosseini Beheshti
- Staff writers: 25
- Founded: 18 May 2009; 17 years ago
- Ceased publication: 13 June 2009
- Political alignment: Reformism (Iranian)
- Language: Persian
- Circulation: 40,000+
- Price: 30 cents
- Website: www.kalemeh.ir (defunct)

Kalameh Sabz (Persian: کلمه سبز, lit. 'Green Word') was an Iranian daily newspaper founded on May 18, 2009 by opposition leader Mir-Hossein Mousavi. Alireza Hosseini Beheshti was the newspaper's editor-in-chief. It primarily focused on reporting politics. The newspaper was aligned with Iranian Reformists and the Green Movement.

On June 26, 2009, the newspaper's entire staff of 25 employees was arrested. Kalameh Sabz was banned for allegedly publishing an "unspecified caricature" and insulting president of Iran Mahmoud Ahmadinejad.

== Profile ==
Kalameh Sabz was announced on May 18, 2009 by Iranian Reformist opposition leader Mir-Hossein Mousavi at the start of his presidential campaign. The newspaper was a 16-page daily and was sold for 30 cents, Alireza Hosseini Beheshti was chosen to be the editor-in-chief. The newspaper covered variety of topics, but mainly Iranian politics. Editor Ebrahim Pashena said Kalameh Sabz reflected Mousavi's political views, he also said it was published nationwide and initially had a circulation of 40,000 copies.

Ministry of Culture and Islamic Guidance stopped giving the newspaper permits to use advertising billboards on May 11, 2009. License to publish Kalemeh Sabz was first issued in March 2008, but publication did not begin until May 18, 2009. The first issue of the newspaper talked about women's rights and Mousavi's Charter of Civil Rights. The first editorial of the newspaper, written by editor-in-chief Alireza Hosseini Beheshti, said that Kalameh Sabz wants to be a "media outlet for all those who hold Iran and Iranians in a higher position".

Kalameh Sabz was scheduled to release on May 16, 2009, but its release was delayed by two days. It was also supposed to be released together with the existing newspaper Yas-e No, but Yas-e No was banned after its first issue.

== Ban and arrests ==
On June 13, 2009, the Iranian government suspended publication of the newspaper but it was set to resume on June 23. On that day, Iranian security agents raided the newspaper's offices and arrested 25 employees of Kalameh Sabz waiting to receive their salaries. Editor-in-chief Alireza Hosseini Beheshti was not arrested during the initial raid. He managed to tell Deutsche Welle that the agents claimed to have a judge's search warrant and that he did not know where the staff had been taken. He, along with his son, were later arrested as they were leaving the offices of Kalameh Sabz. Hosseini was charged with "acting against national security" and was transferred to solitary confinement in Evin Prison. He was sentenced to five years on July 10, 2011.

Mir-Hossein Mousavi said judiciary chief Mahmoud Hashemi Shahroudi told him that Kalameh Sabz was not banned and can continue operating despite the raids and closure of its offices. Mousavi called the actions of the government illegal and unconstitutional. Reporters Without Borders condemned Iranian government for the arrests. Amnesty International declared arrested employees as prisoners of conscience. Sources later reported that the newspaper was banned for allegedly publishing an "unspecified caricature" and insulting president of Iran Mahmoud Ahmadinejad.

In July 2009, the government released 22 of the 25 jailed Kalameh Sabz employees, three editorial staffers remained jailed.
