= Kelid =

Kelid may refer to:

- The Key (1987 film), original title Kelid
- Kelid (newspaper), Iranian newspaper
