= Brazil–Iran relations =

- Brazil: Iran

Diplomatic mission
- Brazilian Embassy, Tehran: Iranian embassy, Brasilia

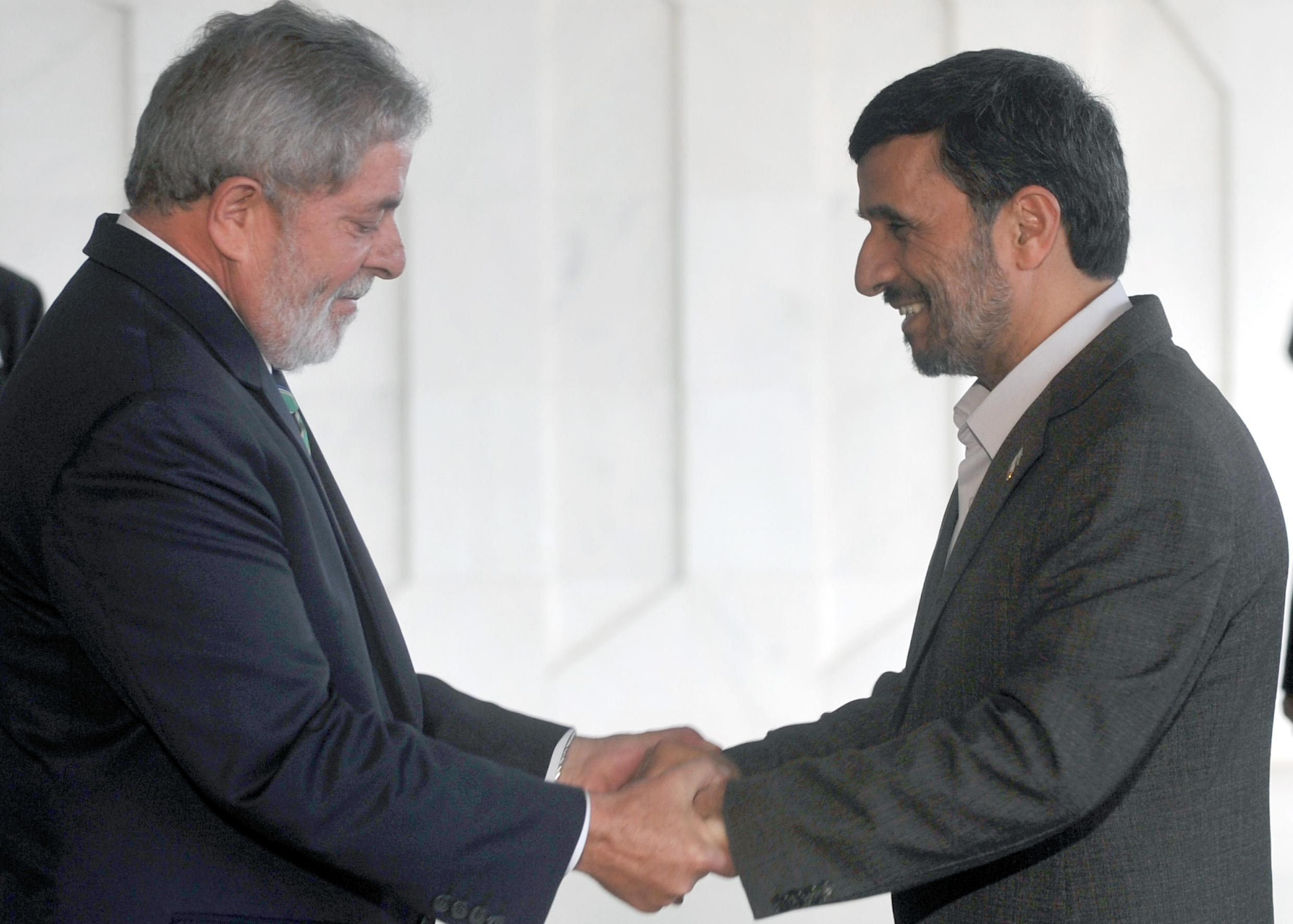
President Luiz Inácio Lula da Silva welcomes the president of the Islamic Republic of Iran, Mahmoud Ahmadinejad, in Brasília.

The Federative Republic of Brazil and the Islamic Republic of Iran maintain bilateral relations that are characterized by economic and diplomatic cooperation and are quite friendly. Iran has a productive trade balance with Brazil. The two governments signed a document to bolster cooperation during the G-15 Summit in Tehran in 2010. However, since the election of former Brazilian president, Dilma Rousseff, relations between the two countries recently have deteriorated greatly, following Rousseff shifting Brazil away from Iran due to Iran's violation of human and civil rights. Mahmoud Ahmadinejad's media adviser, Ali Akbar Javanfekr, was quoted as stating that Rousseff had "destroyed years of good relations" between them. He denied making such a statement.

The Brazilian population has an overwhelmingly negative view of Iran; in a Pew poll from 2015, just 11% of Brazilians had a favorable opinion of Iran, compared to 79% unfavorable.

Although Iran was economically quite significant to Brazil during the presidency of Jair Bolsonaro, since 2019 ties with Iran have diminished. The relationship between the two countries is politically much more remote than before the Bolsonaro era.

== Country comparison ==
	Brazil	Iran
Population	206,081,432	83,183,741
Area	8,514,877 km^{2} (3,287,597 sq mi)	1,648,195 km^{2} (636,372 sq mi)
Population Density	22/km^{2} (57/sq mi)	45/km^{2} (116.6/sq mi)
Capital	Brasília	Tehran
Largest City	São Paulo – 11,037,593 (19,889,559 Metro)	Tehran – 9,110,347 (13,413,348 Metro)
Government	Federal presidential constitutional republic	*de jure: Islamic Republic of Iran: de facto: Islamic Republic of Iran
Current leader	President Luiz Inácio Lula da Silva	President Masoud Pezeshkian
Official languages	Portuguese	Persian
Main religions	74% Roman Catholicism, 15.4% Protestant, 7.4% non-Religious, 1.3% Kardecist spiritism, 1.7% Other religions, 0.1% Afro-Brazilian religions	89% Shia Islam, 11% other religions
GDP (nominal)	US$2.517 trillion ($12,916 per capita)	US$420.894 billion ($6,260 per capita)
Military expenditures	$28.0 billion (SIPRI 2010)	$7.0 billion (SIPRI 2010)

== Background ==
Brazil–Iran relations date back to 1903, but showed they could be promising in 1957, upon signature of a cultural agreement, which came into force on December 28, 1962. This agreement also marks the elevation of the Brazilian legation in Tehran to the condition of embassy, in 1961. In 1965, Shah Mohammad Reza Pahlavi visited Brazil. The main reason for this first contact was to promote the Brazilian presence in Iran and the Middle East through books, films, exchange of professors and intellectuals, and plays. The bilateral relation was further strengthened by an agreement that established a commission on economic and technical cooperation in 1975.

The Brazilian government chose to remain neutral during the Iran–Iraq War (1980–1988), despite its strong economic and military relations with Iraq. During the conflict, Brazil provided both sides with training and military equipment. With the end of hostilities, Brazil decided to pursue Iran to sign a memorandum of understanding that would establish a high-level commission between the two countries. Despite these efforts, relations during the 1990s were overshadowed by domestic politics and resulted in a period of distancing between the two countries. This would only change after president Luiz Inácio Lula da Silva took office in 2003.

The Lula da Silva administration sought, during its first years in office, to reestablish Brazil's influence in the Middle East and deepen its relations with the countries in the region. The Middle East became a foreign policy priority, and Iran was viewed as an extremely important partner. This new policy was met with reciprocity in Tehran. The Iranian government has come to define its relations with Latin America as a top priority. Brasília and Tehran established a permanent high-level consultation mechanism, that alternates between their two capitals, and encompass various areas. This allows both governments to have regular talks and consolidates the bilateral relationship.

The change in Iranian leadership, from the reformist Mohammad Khatami to the ultraconservative Mahmoud Ahmadinejad, did not change the Brazilian perspective. Even prior to the election of Ahmadinejad and his subsequent reelection in 2009, bilateral relations had increased significantly. Since 2003, Brazilian state-run oil company Petrobras has been permitted to explore oil reserves in Iran. Between 2003 and 2005, trade with the Middle East increased 47%. Iran became Brazil's second largest importer in the region.

== Recent history ==
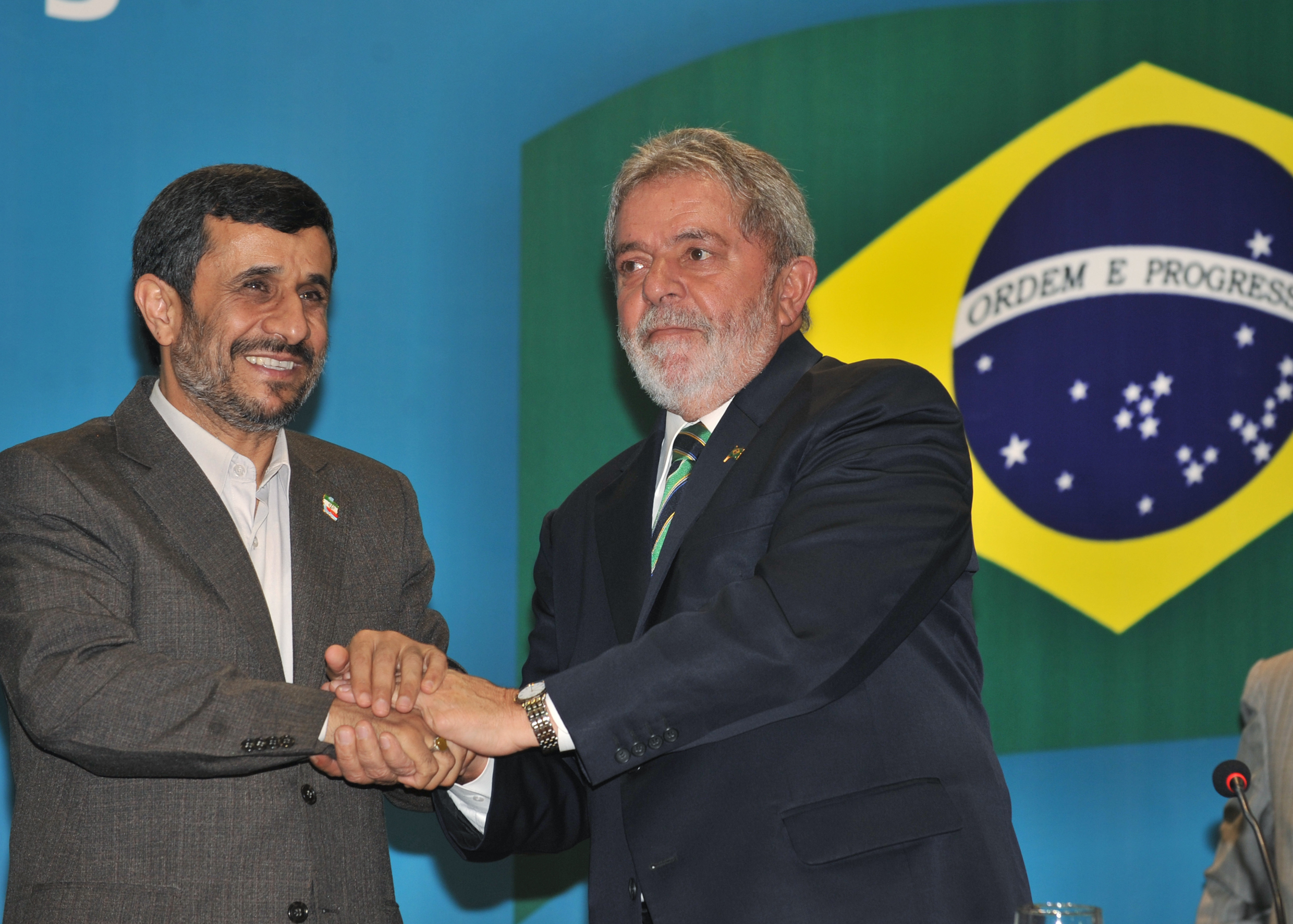
Lula with Iranian president Ahmadinejad, 2009

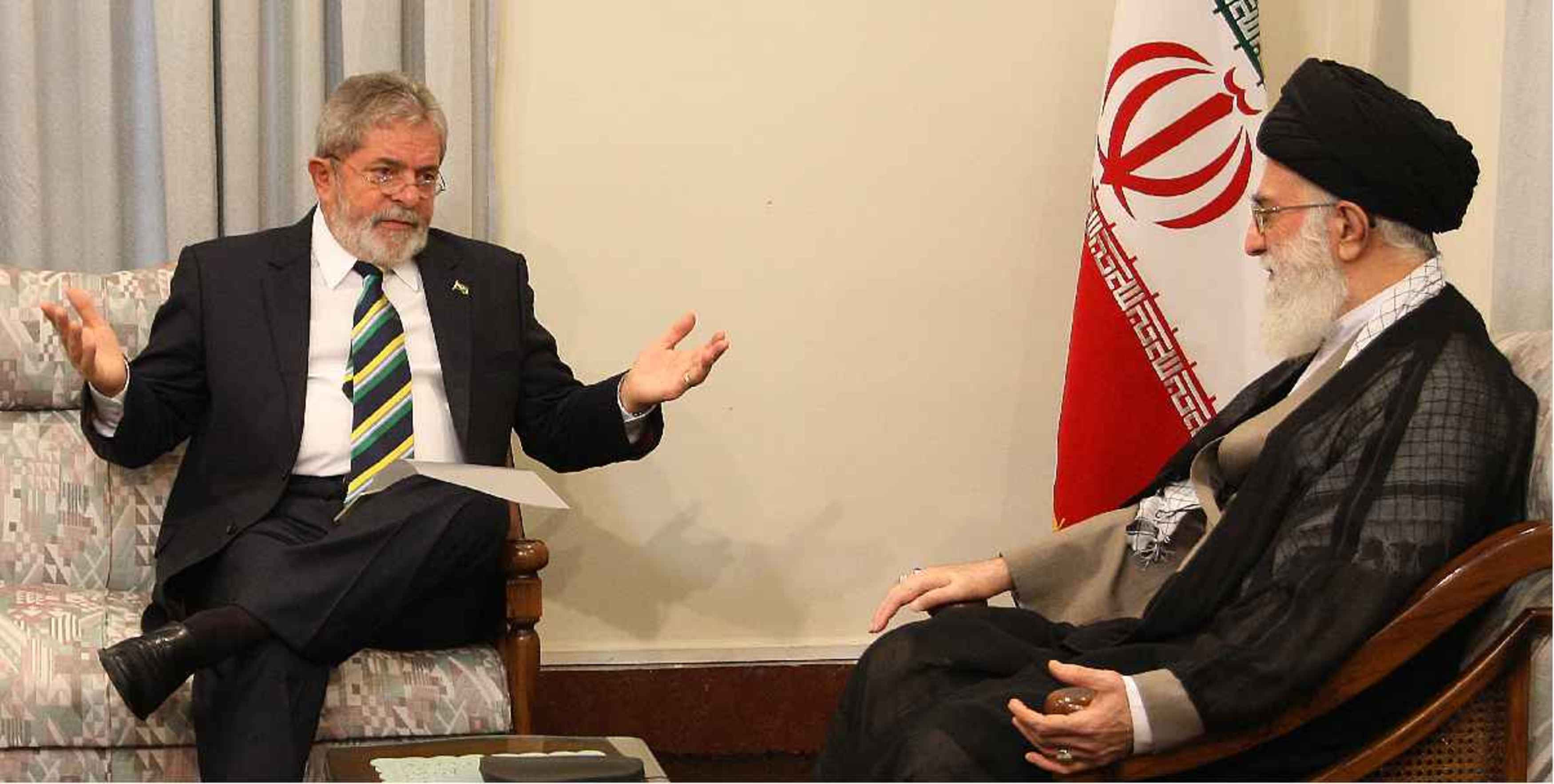
Lula with Supreme Leader of Iran Ali Khamenei, 2010

The conviction by an Iranian court of Iranian Sakineh Mohammadi Ashtiani for the crime of adultery, with a sentence in 2006 of execution by stoning, led to calls for Brazil president Lula to intercede on her behalf. In July 2010 Lula said "I need to respect the laws of a [foreign] country". Jackson Diehl, deputy editorial page editor of The Washington Post, called Lula the "best friend of tyrants in the democratic world," and criticized his actions.

In recent years, Brazil has continued to engage in normal diplomatic relations with Iran, despite the international sanctions against Iran's nuclear program. Brasília considers that the International Atomic Energy Agency, not the United Nations Security Council, should resolve the dispute over the program. In September 2007, President Luiz Inácio Lula da Silva stated that "Iran has the right to proceed with peaceful nuclear research and should not be punished just because of Western suspicions it wants to make an atomic bomb," and that "so far, Iran has committed no crime regarding United Nations guidelines on nuclear weapons." The Brazilian government's view was reaffirmed in November 2008 when Foreign Minister Celso Amorim stated that "Brazil does not recognize unilateral sanctions imposed on Iran, whether by the United States or the European Union, [and] the Iranian government should fully cooperate with the agency because it is the best way to avoid sanctions."

In 2009, Lula warmly hosted Iranian president Ahmadinejad, who made a controversial visit to Iran. Some demonstrators expressed displeasure over Ahmadinejad's positions on human rights and his denial of the Holocaust.

In February 2010, there was some speculation that Brazil could have been involved in direct bilateral talks to provide Iran with weapons-grade uranium, which was denied by Brazilian Foreign Minister Celso Amorim. Amorim stated that, "at no time in conversations held with Iran was [uranium] enrichment discussed."

On May 17, 2010, Brazil, Iran and Turkey issued the "Tehran Nuclear Declaration", a joint declaration, a preliminary fuel swap agreement "in which Iran agreed to send low-enriched uranium to Turkey in return for enriched fuel for a research reactor," that ultimately failed. Despite receiving support for the effort to reach an agreement from some in the international community, the preliminary agreement that they presented to the United Nations was at odds with what the International Atomic Energy Agency and other countries viewed as necessary actions to stop Iran from obtaining weapons grade materials. And within hours of signing the agreement, Iran did an about-face and announced that it would continue to enrich some uranium. U.S. Secretary of State Hillary Clinton said Brazil was being "used" by Tehran. The UN Security Council ultimately rejected it when permanent member country representatives argued that “the swap proposal negotiated by Brazil and Turkey would leave Iran with enough material to make a nuclear weapon,” and that “Iran intends to continue a new program of enriching uranium to a higher level.” Pulitzer Prize winning journalist Thomas Friedman wrote: "Is there anything uglier than watching democrats sell out other democrats to a Holocaust-denying, vote-stealing Iranian thug just to tweak the U.S. and show that they, too, can play at the big power table?" Moisés Naím, editor in chief of Foreign Policy magazine and former Minister of Trade in Venezuela, said "Lula is a political giant, but morally he has been a deep disappointment." In 2010, in addition, Brazilians largely disagreed with Lula as to how to handle Iran and Iran's nuclear weapons program. While Lula opposed additional international economic sanctions against Iran, of the 85% of Brazilians who opposed Iran acquiring nuclear weapons, two-thirds approved of tighter international sanctions on Iran to try to prevent it from developing nuclear weapons.

The United States dismissed announced a "draft accord" among permanent Security Council members for additional sanctions on Iran, designed to pressure it to end its nuclear enrichment program. Turkey and Brazil criticized the sanctions proposal. Brazil's Foreign Minister also expressed frustration with the U.S. stance, saying of Brazil's vote against the sanctions resolution: “We could not have voted in any different way except against.”

The election of Dilma Rousseff as president of Brazil as of 2011 brought a change to the Brazilian policy towards Iran, leading to a cooling in relations between the two nations. Rousseff harshly criticized the human rights situation in Iran. During her electoral campaign, she stated that women stoning in Iran is "medieval behavior". Brazil has since supported a resolution for nominating a U.N. Special Rapporteur for human rights in Iran, whose eventual report condemned Iranian human rights abuses. In response, Iranian President Ahmadinejad's Media Adviser, Ali Akbar Javanfekr, was quoted as stating that Rousseff had "destroyed years of good relations" between the two countries. He later denied having made that statement.

In April 2012, an Iranian diplomat stationed at the Iranian Embassy in Brazil was accused of molesting young girls between the ages of 9–15 years. The diplomat, Hekmatollah Ghorbani, was caught touching the girls inappropriately by one of the girls' parents at a Brazilian country club's pool in the capital city of Brasília. As one parent told reporters, those at the pool were so infuriated that the diplomat would have been "lynched" had local security not intervened. While many in Brazil were infuriated by these actions, the Iranian Embassy in Brazil stated that "the accusation leveled against the Iranian diplomat is only a misunderstanding arising from differences in cultural attitudes”. The Brazilian Foreign Minister, Antonio Patriota expressed his disgust and dismay at the situation by calling it "unacceptable" and "very disturbing". Invoking his diplomatic immunity, the Iranian Diplomat left Brazil. Upon his return to Iran, the diplomat was discharged by the Iranian Foreign Ministry. In a statement, the Iranian Foreign Ministry explained that "following an investigation into the violations by the Iranian employee of the Iranian Embassy in Brazil, it was confirmed that he had failed to comply with administrative regulations and professional and Islamic moralities."

=== Ahmadinejad's visit to Rio ===
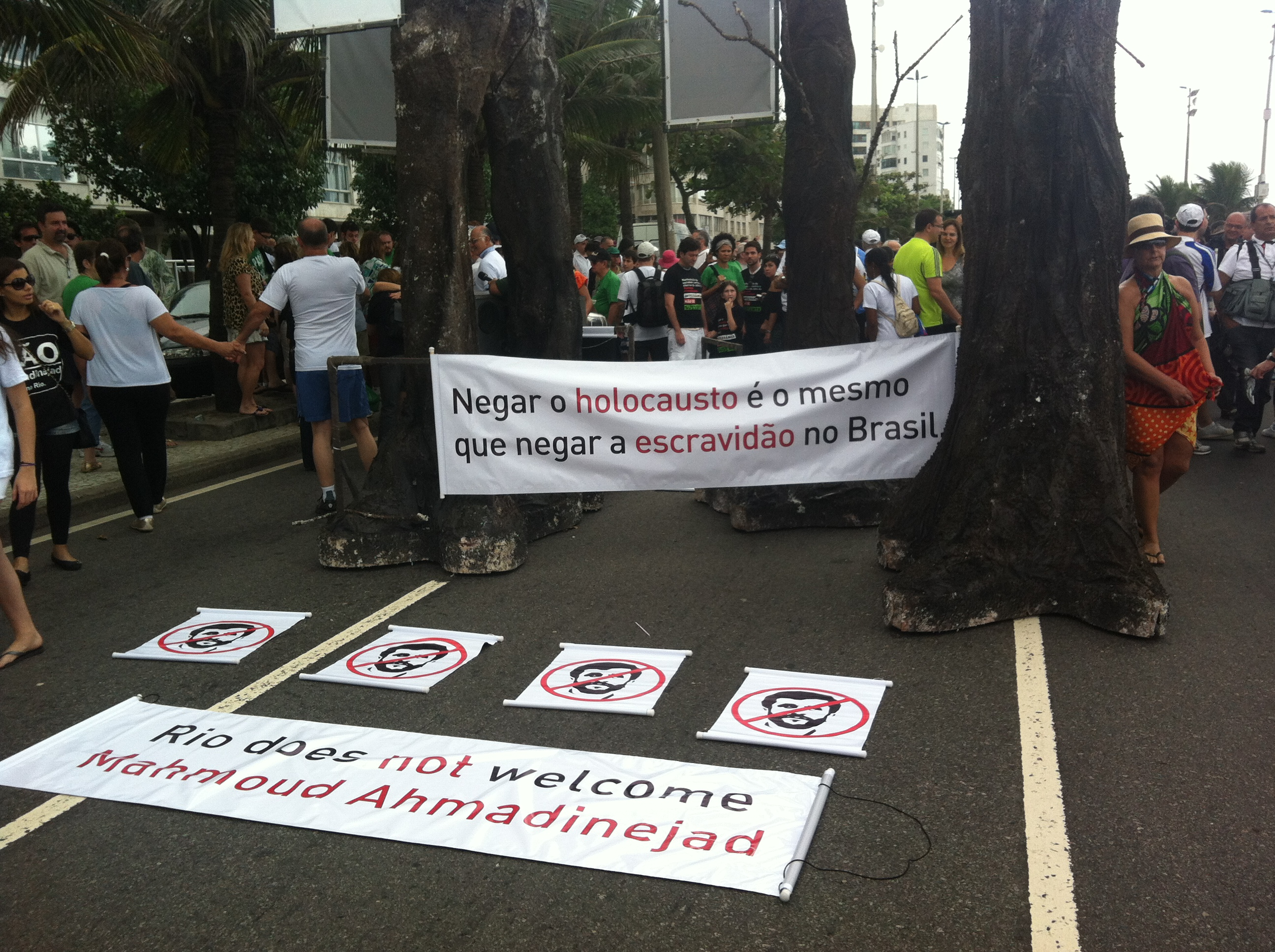
Activists protest the presence of Ahmadinejad at the Rio+20 summit

There was some controversy over Iran's involvement in the Rio+20 conference. Iran sent a delegation, which included President Ahmadinejad, to Rio de Janeiro to attend the summit. The controversy of Iranian attendance at the summit surrounds the fact that Iran has serious environmental issues, which it has refused to address, continuing human rights violations and is refusing to cooperate with the IAEA over its contentious nuclear program.

The Iranian delegation was met with protesters who waved banners with the slogan “Ahmadinejad go home”. The demonstrators were mostly made up of human rights activists, homosexuals and Jews demonstrating against Iran's violation of human rights and their unresolved environment issues. Several states boycotted Iran through walking out during Ahmadinejad's speech, including Canada. A Canadian representative for the Environment Minister Peter Kent, who led the delegation, said that their walkout was designed to "...send a strong message to Iran, and to the world, that Canada will not tolerate Iran's radical and dangerous rhetoric." Other delegations including the United States, Israel, Australia, the United Kingdom, and the European Union also boycotted the Iranian President's speech.

Brazilian President Dilma Rousseff rejected a meeting request from Iranian President Mahmoud Ahmadinejad. Rio de Janeiro Mayor, Eduardo Paes, also canceled the inauguration of a replica of the famed Persepolis columns offered by Iran. The event had been scheduled with the presence of the Iranian leader.

=== Relations since 2019 ===
Brazil-Iran relations worsened after right-wing Jair Bolsonaro won Brazilian 2018 presidential election. Brazil was one of the few countries to openly back the elimination on January 3, 2020, of Qassem Soleimani, commander of Iran's Islamic Revolutionary Guard Corps (IRGC)’s extraterritorial Quds Force. Iran made a decision to summon Brazil's charge d’affaires over comments about the death of the senior Iranian general. President Bolsonaro has repeatedly expressed his sympathy for Israel, Iran's archenemy.

In 2023 the government of President Luiz Inacio Lula da Silva allowed two Iranian Navy warships, forward base ship IRIS Makran and frigate IRIS Dena, to dock in Rio de Janeiro. This happened in spite of on February 3, the US Treasury Department's Office of Foreign Assets Control singling out Makran and Dena as Iranian properties for sanctions to punish Iran's murderous drone industry.

Lula endorsed admitting Iran into the BRICS club, and in August 2023 met with Iranian president Ebrahim Raeisi. Lula stopped short of condemning Iran’s rights abuses.

== Trade ==
Brazil remains Iran's main trading partner and exporter in Latin America with a total trade of $2.33 billion in 2011, up 5% from the previous year. Brazil's top exports to Iran include food, medication, minerals and automobiles. Petrobras has made substantial investments in the Iranian oil and gas sector in recent years. Iran was Brazil's largest export market for beef in 2011.

	2006	2007	2008	2009	2010	2011	2021
(Brazil) Brazilian exports to Iran	$1.6 billion	$1.8 billion	$1.1 billion	$1.2 billion	$2.1 billion	$2.3 billion	$1.94 billion
(Iran) Iranian exports to Brazil	$30 million	$10 million	$14 million	$18 million	$123 million	$35 million	$59.2 million
Total trade	$1.63 billion	$1.81 billion	$1.11 billion	$1.21 billion	$2.22 billion	$2.33 billion	
Note: All values are in U.S. dollars. Source: MDIC.

=== َAgricultural trade ===
Brazil exports corn, soybean, raw sugar, soybean meal and oil to Iran; while Iran mainly exports chemical fertilizers like urea and nitrogenous fertilizers to Brazil.

== Nuclear energy ==
Brazil supports Iran's program to develop nuclear technology for peaceful purposes, though both countries have agreed to stop the proliferation of nuclear weapons. Brazil and Turkey agreed to a fuel-swap deal with Tehran during the G-15 Summit in May 2010 in a failed attempt to avoid further international sanctions against Iran. Later in June 2010, Brazil voted against United Nations Security Council Resolution 1929.

== Polls ==
According to the BBC, only 8% of Brazilians view Iran's influence positively, with 66% of Brazilians expressing a negative view. According to a 2012 Pew Global Attitudes Survey, 13% of Brazilians viewed Iran favorably, compared to 74% which viewed it unfavorably; 91% of Brazilians oppose Iranian acquisition of nuclear weapons and 62% approve of "tougher sanctions" on Iran, while 55% of Brazilians support use of military force to prevent Iran from developing nuclear weapons.

== Resident diplomatic missions ==
- Brazil has an embassy in Tehran.
- Iran has an embassy in Brasília.

== See also ==
- Foreign relations of Brazil
- Foreign relations of Iran
- Iranian Brazilians
