= Informatics Society of Iran =

Non government organization in Iran

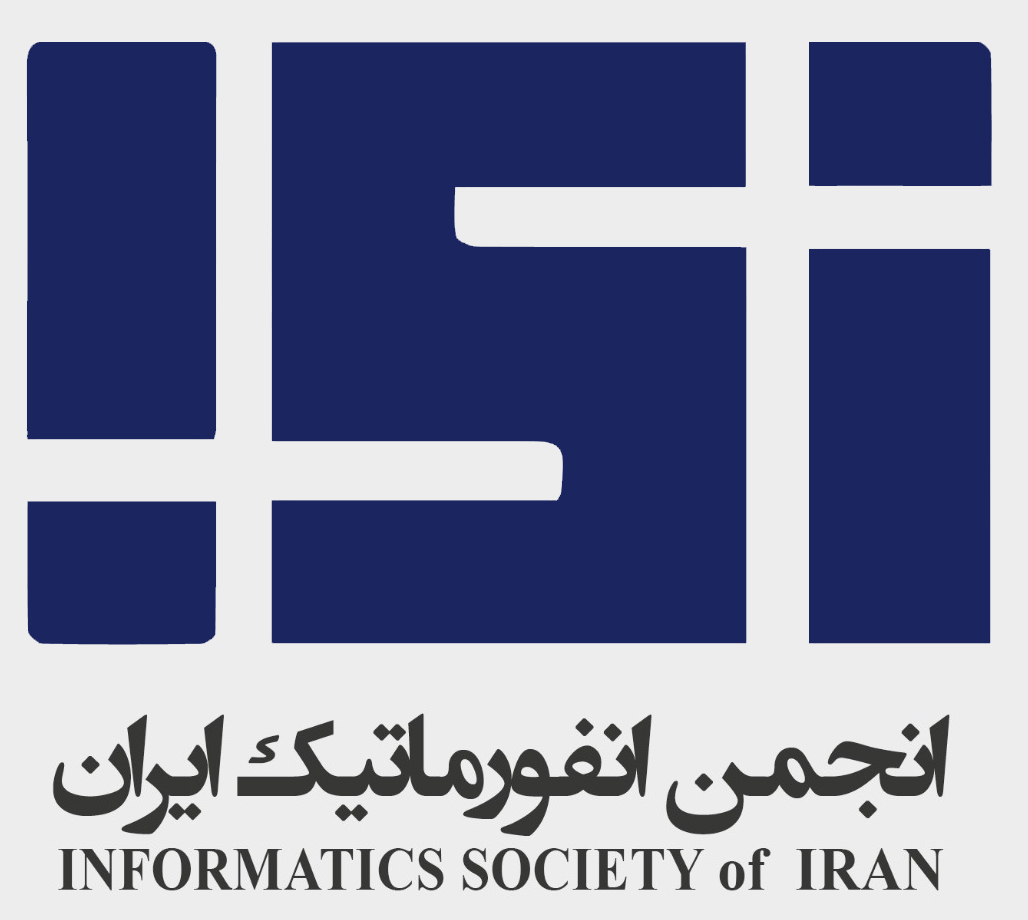
- Founded: 1979
- Type: Non-governmental organization
- Headquarters: Iran
- Website: Isi.org.ir

The Informatics Society of Iran (Persian: انجمن انفورماتیک ایران) is a non-profit organization established in Tehran in September 1978. Its primary objective is to promote the proper application of informatics and to advance the level of computer science knowledge within Iran.

With over 45 years of activity, the Informatics Society of Iran is considered the oldest scientific association related to computer science and engineering in the country. It has consistently been recognized by the Commission of Scientific Associations of the Ministry of Science, Research, and Technology as one of Iran's most active scientific associations.

== Objectives ==
The main objectives of the society include the development of scientific and technical standards, the examination of the impact of computer technology on society and the environment, and assistance in the formulation of supportive and protective laws related to informatics in Iran. The society strives to improve the quality of education, encourage research activities, and facilitate exchange of ideas and collaboration among experts in this field.

The Informatics Society of Iran aims to achieve its goals through the publication of newsletters, scientific journals, and specialized books. It also organizes lectures, seminars, and scientific conferences at the national and international levels, and collaborates with scientific and industrial centers to promote informatics knowledge. The society also conducts specialized training courses and helps classify informatics professions by evaluating credentials and professional experiences. The publication of two journals, "Computer Report" and "Journal of Computing Sciences," is among the other activities of this society.

== History ==
The idea of establishing the Informatics Society of Iran was proposed in (1977), followed by the development and proposal of its constitution. After discussions and exchanges of opinions among interested individuals, a general session was held on (September 19, 1978), during which the current name of the society was approved instead of "Iran Computer Society." A seven-member group was chosen with full authority to pursue the society's activities until the registration and formation of the first general assembly. The members of this group were:

1. Mohammad Javad Ashjaei, Isfahan University of Technology
2. The late Morteza Anvari, Higher School of Planning and Computer Application
3. Lotfali Bakhshi, Islamic Azad University
4. Ebrahim Bahjat, Hadabann Consulting Company
5. Dr Behrouz Parhami, Tehran Polytechnic University
6. Hossein Jafari Fesharaki
7. Ahmad Miraatnia, Tehran Polytechnic University

== Committees ==
The organisation has the following committees:

- Membership
- Public Relations
- Scientific Seminars
- Publications
- Education and Research.

== Services ==
- Gozaresh Computer Magazine
- Monthly public seminar
- Monthly expert group seminar
- Persian dictionary of computing words

== See also ==
- Science and technology in Iran
