= Sagheb =

The Sagheb is a long-range surface-to-surface missile being developed by the Iranian navy. The missile has range of 80 to 250 kilometres and is named after the Arabic word for piercing. Details of the missile are still sketchy.

== Test launch ==
Iran state television, referring to it as a long-range missile that evades radar, reported its successful test launch from a submarine in the Persian Gulf on August 27, 2006. The Islamic Republic News Agency reported that the test launch involved the destruction of a target on the water surface a mile away from the submarine. The test was part of the Blow of Zolfaqar military exercises which began across the country August 19, and are expected to last five weeks.
