= List of Persian-language magazines =

This is a list of magazines published in the Persian language.

Name Tehran weekly Magazine	Date november 8th 1996	Topic farsi magazine Publishe in USA	Shahbod Noori Editor
3feed	2014–	Speculative fiction	
Aleph Magazine		seasonal magazine published in Canada	
Bukhara magazine			
Daneshmand	2006–	Weekly Magazine Published In Canada	
Donya ye Bazi	2005–2014	First official Iranian video game magazine	
Gooya		biweekly magazine published in the UAE	
Gozaresh			
Incidents			
Irana Esperantisto			
Iran Star	1994–	Weekly newspaper and magazine published in Canada	
Nashriya-i Madrasa-i Mubaraka-i Dar al-Funun-i Tabriz	1893–1894		
Payam Javan	2009–	Iranian American Magazine Bay Area and Sacramento	
Persia Page	2020–	Lifestyle magazine published in the US	
Saday-i-Imroz		Indian annual magazine in Persian from Mau	
Salam Vancouver	2018–	Weekly Magazine Published In Canada Covering Local & International News	
Living in Tehran	2017	Initially an annual English language magazine, now online-only in English from Tehran	
Shahrvand-e-Emrooz			
Sharafat	1896–1903		

== See also ==
- Media of Iran
- List of newspapers in Iran
