= Fath (newspaper) =

- Type: Daily newspaper
- Publisher: Yadollah Eslami
- Ceased publication: April 2000
- Political alignment: Reformist
- Language: Persian
- Headquarters: Tehran, Iran

Fath (Persian: فتح, lit. 'The Conquest') was a Persian-language daily newspaper published in Tehran, Iran.

== History ==
Fath was published by the same team of journalists that published Khordad, led by Yadollah Eslami. While cracking down on reformist publications, Iran banned Fath in April 2000; saying it was publishing articles that "disparaged Islam and the religious elements of the Islamic revolution."

== See also ==
List of newspapers in Iran
