= Afarinesh =

Persian-language newspaper in Iran

- Type: Daily newspaper
- Format: Print, online
- Owner: Islamic Azad University
- Publisher: Islamic Azad University
- Founded: 2002
- Political alignment: Conservative
- Language: Persian
- Headquarters: Iran
- Website: Website

Afarinesh (Persian: آفرینش, lit. 'Creation') is a Persian-language daily newspaper published in Iran.

== Profile ==
Nazila Fathi of The New York Times described Afarinesh as a conservative paper in 2002. The paper has ties with the Islamic Azad University.

The managing director of the paper was convicted by the press court for "publishing false reports with the intention of disturbing the public opinion" in 2010.

== See also ==
- List of newspapers in Iran
