= Anti-Azerbaijani sentiment =

Hostility, fear or intolerance against Azerbaijanis

Anti-Azerbaijani sentiment, Azerophobia, Azerbaijanophobia, or anti-Azerbaijanism has been mainly rooted in several countries, most notably in Russia, Armenia, and Iran, where anti-Azerbaijani sentiment has sometimes led to violent ethnic incidents.

== By country ==
=== Armenia ===
In the early 20th century, the Transcaucasian Armenians began to equate the Azerbaijanis (then called Caucasian Tatars) with the perpetrators of anti-Armenian policies such as the Armenian genocide in the Ottoman Empire, due to the Armenian–Tatar massacres of 1905–1906.

On March 30, 1918, during a Bolshevik takeover orchestrated by Stepan Shahumyan, an estimate of 3,000 to 10,000 Azerbaijanis were killed by Bolshevik troops and ethnic Armenian militias, while up to 2,500 Armenians were killed by ethnic Azerbaijani militias.
Azerbaijani sources say that 20,000 Azerbaijanis were killed.

According to Firuz Kazemzadeh,

The brutalities continued for weeks. No quarter was given by either side: neither age nor sex was respected. Enormous crowds roamed the streets, burning houses, killing every pass-by who was identified as an enemy, many innocent persons suffering death at the hands of both the Armenians and the Azerbaijanis. The struggle which had begun as a political contest between Musavat and the Soviet assumed the character of a gigantic race riot.

==== Nagorno-Karabakh ====
After the First Nagorno-Karabakh War, anti-Azerbaijani sentiment grew in Armenia, leading to harassment of Azerbaijanis there. In the beginning of 1988 the first refugee waves from Armenia reached Baku. In 1988, Azerbaijanis and Kurds (around 167,000 people) were expelled from the Armenian SSR. Following the Karabakh movement, initial violence erupted in the form of the murder of both Armenians and Azerbaijanis and border skirmishes. As a result of these skirmishes, 214 Azerbaijanis were killed.

On June 7, 1988, Azerbaijanis were evicted from the town of Masis near the Armenian–Turkish border, and on June 20, five villages that were mostly populated by Azerbaijanis were emptied in the Ararat Province. Henrik Pogosian was ultimately forced to retire, blamed for letting nationalism develop freely. Although purges of the Armenian and Azerbaijani party structures were made against those who had fanned or not sought to prevent ethnic strife, as a whole, the measures taken are believed to be meager.

1993 was marked by the highest wave of refugees in Azerbaijan, when the Artsakh Defence Army occupied territories beyond the borders of Nagorno-Karabakh.

==== Post-war ====
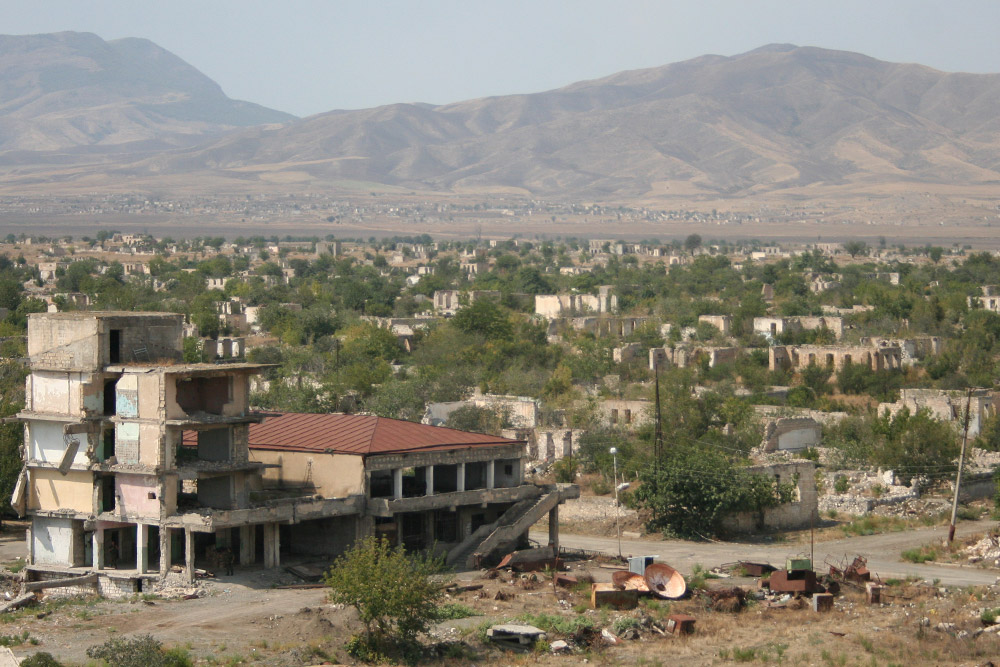
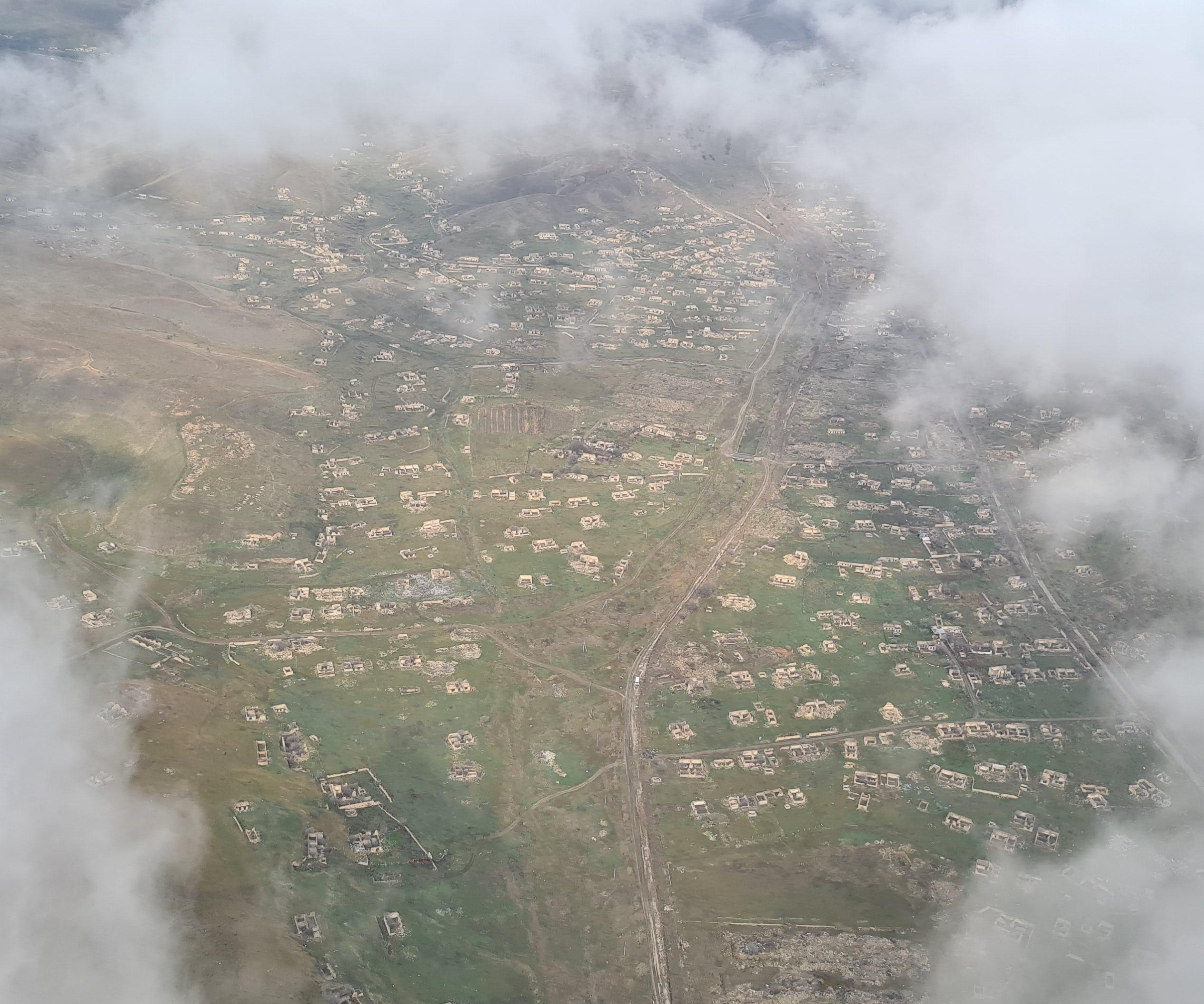
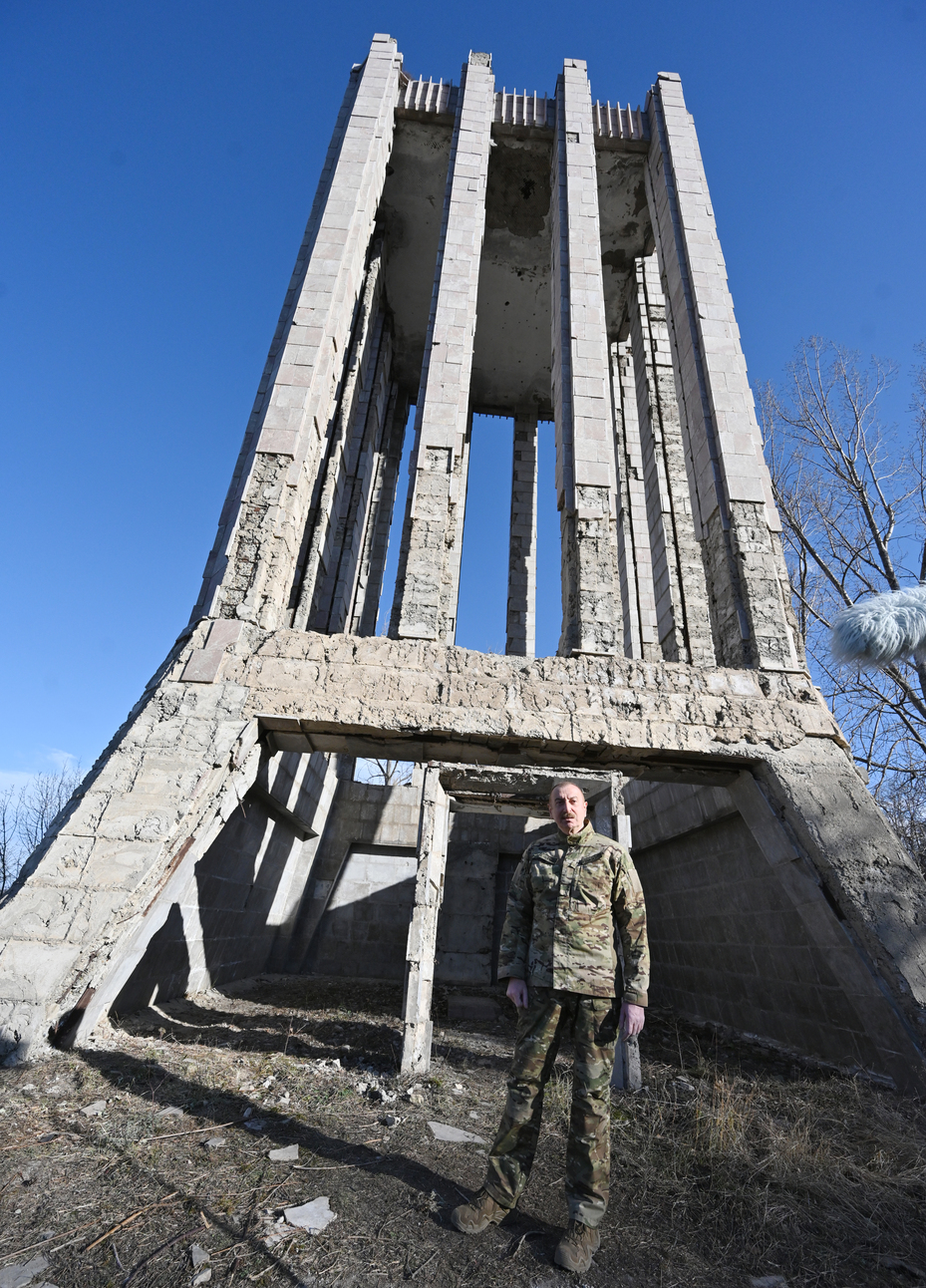
Destroyed cities of Aghdam and Jabrayil. Ilham Aliyev in front of the ruined Vagif Mausoleum in Shusha.

On January 16, 2003 Robert Kocharian said that Azerbaijanis and Armenians were "ethnically incompatible" and it was impossible for the Armenian population of Karabakh to live within an Azerbaijani state. Speaking on 30 January in Strasbourg, Council of Europe Secretary-General Walter Schwimmer said Kocharian's comment was tantamount to warmongering. Parliamentary Assembly of the Council of Europe President Peter Schieder said he hopes Kocharian's remark was incorrectly translated, adding that "since its creation, the Council of Europe has never heard the phrase "ethnic incompatibility".

In 2010, an initiative to hold a festival of Azerbaijani films in Yerevan was blocked due to popular opposition. Similarly, in 2012 a festival of Azerbaijani short films, organized by the Armenia-based Caucasus Center for Peace-Making Initiatives and supported by the U.S. and British embassies, which was scheduled to open on April 12, was canceled in Gyumri after protesters blocked the festival venue.

On September 2, 2015, the Minister of Justice Arpine Hovhannisyan shared an article link on her personal Facebook page featuring her interview with the Armenian news website Tert.am where she condemned the sentencing of an Azerbaijani journalist and called the human rights situation in Azerbaijan "appalling". Subsequently, the minister came under criticism for liking a racist comment on the aforementioned Facebook post by Hovhannes Galajyan, editor-in-chief of local Armenian newspaper Iravunk; On the post, Galajyan had commented in Armenian: "What human rights when even purely biologically a Turk cannot be considered a human".

==== Mosques in Armenia ====
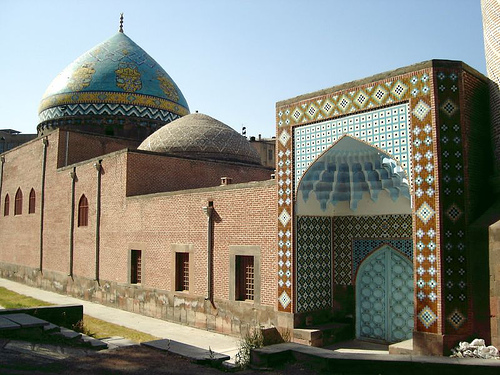
Blue Mosque, Yerevan

The Blue Mosque is the only functioning Persian mosque and one of the two remaining mosques in present-day Yerevan. In the opinion of the journalist Thomas de Waal, writing out Azerbaijanis of Armenia from history was made easier by a linguistic sleight of hand, as the name "Azeri" or "Azerbaijani" was not in common usage before the twentieth century, and these people were referred to as "Tartars", "Turks" or simply "Muslims". De Waal adds that "Yet they were neither Persians nor Turks; they were Turkic-speaking Shiite subjects of the Safavid Dynasty of the Iranian Empire". According to De Waal, when the Blue Mosque is referred to as Persian it "obscures the fact that most of the worshippers there, when it was built in the 1760s, would have been, in effect, Azerbaijanis".

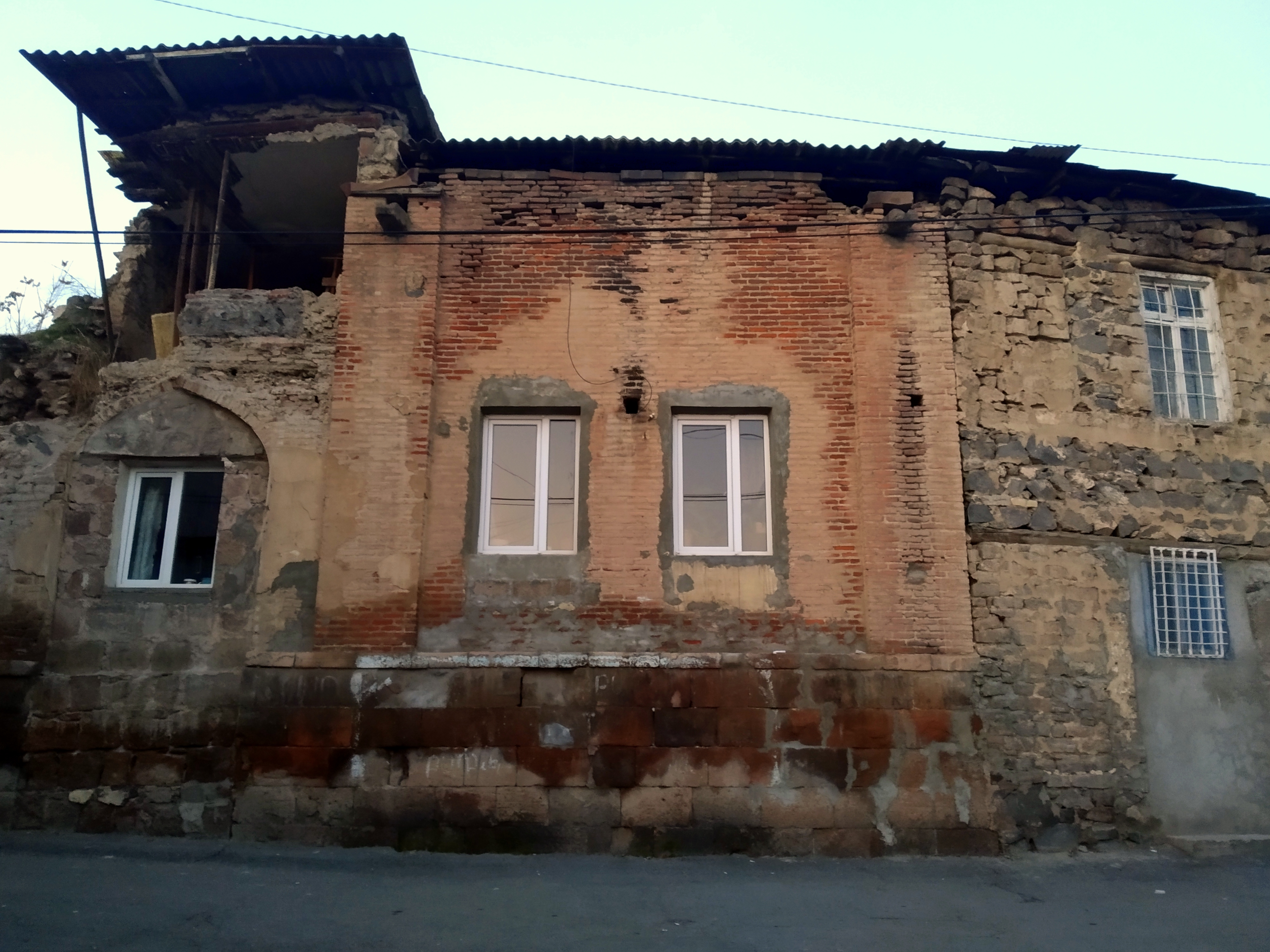
Tapabashy Mosque, Kond, Yerevan

The other remaining mosque in Yerevan, the Tapabashy Mosque, was likely built in 1687 during the Safavid dynasty in the historic Kond district. Today, only the 1.5 meter-thick walls and sections of its outer perimeter roof still stand. The main dome collapsed in the 1960s (1980's according to residents and neighbors), though a smaller dome still stands. The mosque was used as by Armenian refugees following the Armenian genocide, and their descendants still live inside the mosque today. According to residents, the Azerbaijanis of Yerevan held prayer services until they left for Baku in 1988 due to the tensions surrounding the war. The remnants of the mosque are protected by the Armenian state as a historical monument. In 2021, Armenia issued a tender to restore and reconstruct the historic Kond district including the mosque.

In the Syunik Province of Armenia, the remaining mosques in the towns of Kapan, Sisian, and Meghri are maintained by the state under the Non-Armenian historical and cultural Monuments in Syunik designation.

==== Polling ====
According to a 2012 opinion poll, 63% of Armenians perceive Azerbaijan as "the biggest enemy of Armenia" while 94% of Azerbaijanis consider Armenia to be "the biggest enemy of Azerbaijan". The root of the hostility against Azerbaijanis can be traced from the Nagorno-Karabakh conflict.

=== Georgia ===
During Georgia's movement toward independence from the Soviet Union, the Azeri population expressed fear for its fate in an independent Georgia. In the late 1980s, most ethnic Azeris occupying local government positions in the Azeri-populated areas were removed from their positions. In 1989, there were changes in the ethnic composition of the local authorities and the resettlement of thousands of migrants who had suffered from landslides in the mountainous region of Svaneti. The local Azeri population, accepting the migrants at first, demanded only to resolve the problem of Azeri representation on the municipal level. The demands were ignored; later the migrants, culturally different from the local population and facing social hardships, were accused of attacks and robbery against the Azeris, which in turn led to demonstrations, ethnic clashes between Svans and Azeris, demands for Azeri autonomy in Borchali, and for the expulsion of Svan immigrants from Kvemo-Kartli. The antagonism reached its peak during the presidency of Zviad Gamsakhurdia (1991–1992), when hundreds of Azeri families were forcibly evicted from their homes in Dmanisi and Bolnisi by nationalist paramilitaries. Thousands of Azeris emigrated to Azerbaijan in fear of nationalist policies. In his speech in Kvareli, Gamsakhurdia accused the Azeri population of Kakheti of "holding up their heads and measuring swords with Kakheti". The Georgian nationalist press expressed concern with regard to the fast natural growth of the Azeri population.

Although ethnic oppression in the 1990s did not take place on a wide scale, minorities in Georgia, especially Azeris, Abkhazians, and Ossetians, encountered the problem of dealing with nationalist organisations established in some parts of the country. Previously not prone to migrating, Azeris became the second-largest emigrating ethnic community in Georgia in the early 1990s, with three-quarters of these mainly rural emigrants leaving for Azerbaijan and the rest for Russia. Unlike other minority groups, many remaining Azeris cited attachment to their home communities and unwillingness to leave behind well-developed farms as their reason to stay. Furthermore, Georgian-born Azeris who immigrated to Azerbaijan at various times, including 50,000 Georgian-born spouses of Azerbaijani citizens, reported bureaucratic problems faced in Azerbaijan, with some unable to acquire Azerbaijani citizenship for nearly 20 years.

=== Iran ===
Anti-Azerbaijani sentiment in Iran is rooted in the hostility of the 1990s, during which Iran was blamed by Azerbaijan for supporting Armenia in the First Nagorno-Karabakh War, despite the Iranian government claiming to have helped Azerbaijan. A sense of hostility against Azerbaijan developed in Iran as a result, fostering an alliance between Iran and Armenia.

In 2006, a cartoon controversy with regard to Azerbaijani people had led to unrest, as the cartoon had compared the Azerbaijanis to cockroaches. During 2012, fans of Tractor Sazi, an Azerbaijani-dominated football club, chanted anti-Iranian racist rhetorics, raising their voice against oppression of ethnic Azerbaijanis by the Iranian government and their neglect after the East Azerbaijan earthquakes; the Iranian police force responded violently, arresting dozens. Azerbaijani activists have also increasingly faced harassment by the Iranian government for their effort to protect the Azerbaijani minority in Iran.

== See also ==
- Anti-Turkish sentiment
- List of massacres in Azerbaijan
