= Abrar =

Iranian daily newspaper

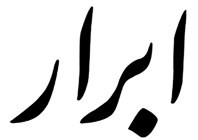
- Type: Daily newspaper
- Owner(s): Abrar Publications Group
- Founded: 8 November 1988
- Political alignment: Conservative
- Language: Persian
- Headquarters: Tehran
- Sister newspapers: Abrar-e Varzeshi; Abrar-e Eghtesdai
- Website: Abrar

Abrar (Persian: ابرار, Samaritans in English) is a Persian-language daily newspaper published in Tehran, Iran.

== History and profile ==
Abrar was first published on 8 November 1988. The printing of the paper was done using the printing facility of a defunct leftist newspaper, Azadegan. It is described by the US newspapers as hard-line and traditional conservative publication. Mohammad Safizadeh, former minister of interior, holds the licence of Abrar. The paper is based in Tehran and focuses on political, cultural, social and economic news. It has two sister newspapers, Abrar-e Varzeshi (Sports Abrar) and Abrar-e Eghtesdai (Economic Abrar).

During the presidency of Akbar Hashemi Rafsanjani Abrar was one of his supporters. In June 2013, the offices of the paper were raided and sealed and it was closed down.

== See also ==
- List of newspapers in Iran
