= Abrar-e Varzeshi =

- Type: Daily newspaper
- Language: Persian
- Headquarters: Iran
- Website: official website

Abrar-e Varzeshi (Persian: ابرار ورزشی, lit. 'Samaritans Sports') is a daily newspaper published in Iran.

== Profile ==
Abrar-e Varzeshi is a sports daily. Its sister newspapers are Abrar and Abrar-e Eghtesdai.

== See also ==
- List of newspapers in Iran
