= Alireza Bakhtiari =

Chief executive officer

Alireza Bakhatiari is the CEO of the Donya-e-Eqtesad Taban Media Group, otherwise known as DEN. The DEN encompasses the titles of, Donya-e-Eqtesad Daily (a Persian-language economic newspaper), EcoIran (an economic internet TV), Tejarat-e-Farda (a weekly business journal), EghtesadNews (an economic news agency), and the Financial Tribune (an English-language economic newspaper).
