= Touka Neyestani =

Iranian political cartoonist (born 1960)

- Born: 1960 (age 65–66) Iran
- Area: Cartoonist
- Pseudonym: Touka
- Notable works: Crocodile Cartoon
- Relatives: Mana Neyestani (brother)

Touka Neyestani (Persian: توکا نیستانی; born May 4, 1960) is an Iranian political cartoonist who lives in Toronto, Ontario, Canada. He is the elder brother of Mana Neyestani, who is also a cartoonist.

== Life and career ==
Touka Neyestani was born in Tehran into a literary family. His father Manouchehr Neyestani (1936 - 1981) was a well-known Iranian poet and his brother Mana Neyestani also became a cartoonist and political satirist. Touka Neyestani is a well-known and popular cartoonist in Iran in his own right. He collaborates with more than 40 Iranian newspapers, and also produces cartoons for Nebel Spalter, a weekly publication printed in Switzerland. He has participated in several international cartoon exhibitions held in Japan, Belgium, Turkey, Iran, and Italy.

Political satirists, living in Iran, face a number of threats. Work for cartoonists in daily newspapers has largely dried up. A website known as Persian Cartoons (Persiancartoons.com), designed to provide a mechanism for political satire to be dessiminated, was shut down in 2005, and many cartoonists have been forced to flee the country to escape the Secret Police. As a result, Neyestani has gravitated towards social media as the primary outlet for his cartoons, simply because it gives him greater control over who can read and comment on his posts. Facebook is also less likely to be hacked by the Islamic regime's cyber-security team. The Internet and social media have played an important part of the evolution of political satire in Iran.

== Awards ==
He is the winner of many prizes, some from International cartoon exhibitions, including:

- The Fifth Yomiuri Shimbun Cartoon Contest - Excellence Prize - 1984
- 11th Simavi International Cartoon Competition - Honorable Mention - 1993
- First International Cartoon Competition, "Iran": "Man and Nature" - Honorable Mention - 1997
- Sbadiglio Umoristico - Honorable Mention - 1998
