= Financial Tribune =

Non-governmental newspaper in Iran

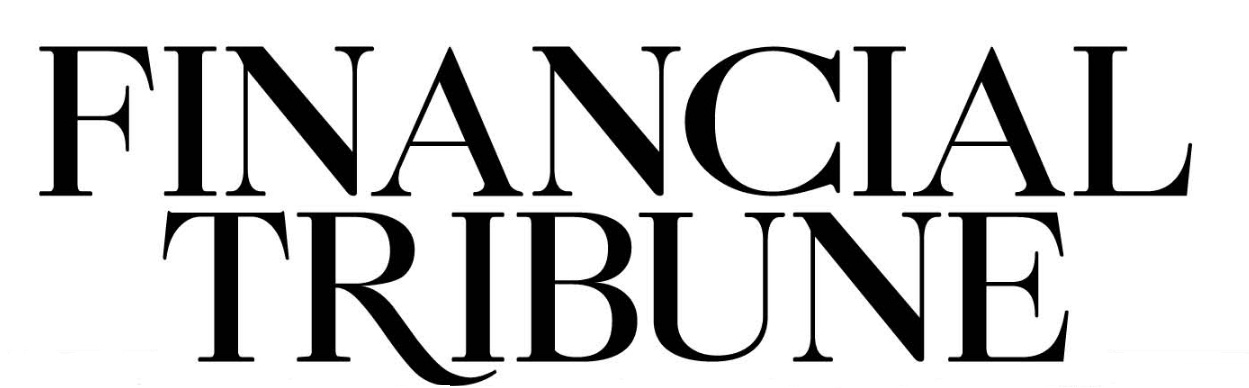
- Type: Newspaper
- Format: Broadsheet
- Owner: Alireza Bakhtiari
- Publisher: DEN Group
- Editor-in-chief: Khosro Ghadiri
- Staff writers: 50
- Founded: 2014
- Political alignment: Center right
- Language: English
- Headquarters: Tehran, Iran
- City: Tehran
- Country: Iran
- Circulation: 60,000 (January 2016)
- Sister newspapers: Donya-e-Eqtesad, Tejarat-e-Farda (in Persian)
- Website: www.financialtribune.com

Financial Tribune is a non-governmental newspaper in Iran that was launched in 2014. It focuses primarily on economic and business news, along with coverage of various related fields. The publication ceased operations in 2023 but resumed its online edition in October 2025.

== Profile ==
The Financial Tribune's editor-in-chief is Khosro Ghadiri, the paper's Senior editor is Amin Sabooni, formerly the editor-in-chief of Iran Daily newspaper. Pouya Jabal Ameli is the senior economic analyst of the newspaper. Mohammad Amin Mokarrami is its current editor.

Financial Tribune's licence holder is "Donyay-e Eqtesad Media Group" and its owner is Alireza Bakhtiari who also runs the Donya-e-Eqtesad newspaper, Tejarat-e-Farda magazine and Eghtesad News website.

As of 2014, the Financial Tribune's main headquarters are in the central business district in Iran's capital Tehran.

The newspaper covers a host of up-and-coming sectors in Iran's economy. In recent months its technology and new business experts have covered subjects from the first EU-Iran Forum hosted in London to new online startup businesses operating in the country.

In April 2015, the newspaper became a 16-page newspaper with alternating pages between local and international automotive stories, science and technology developments, and environment-tourism articles.

The creation of the new sections including automotive and technology in 2014, was in part due to senior editor Morteza Khazeni, who was employed by the publication.

Being the first English-language paper in the country to do the variable format of sections.

The Tribune has been actively covering news about Iran's re-engagement with the global economy following the lifting of the sanctions in January 2016, including Iran's airplane deals, banking relations, bilateral trade, auto deals, and international cooperation in oil, gas and renewable energies.

In 2016, the paper was ranked 6th in Ministry of Culture's list of top Iranian business newspapers. From among six candidates the Financial Tribune was selected by judges as the top website in the 'Economic News' category in the ninth edition of Iran Web Awards in 2017.

In 2017, Financial Tribune CEO Alireza Bakhtiari was awarded the Amin al-Zarb award in recognition of his journalistic endeavors in the private sector.

On September 23, 2018, and following the worsening condition of country's economy, the newspaper announced that it will be published in 8 pages. As the results, art and culture, people, sports, environment and world economy pages were removed from the print version.

== Causes ==
The newspaper has been a vocal critic of Iranian government policies in regards to handling Iran's ongoing water crisis since the development of the paper's environment section in January 2015. With titles such as "Water Management Deserves new Strategy", "Water Crisis: A New Wake-Up Call" and "Experts Review Water Crisis".

== English newspapers in Iran ==
There are five English-language newspapers in Iran. The Financial Tribune was the only English-language newspaper on economics. The other newspapers published in English in Iran are the Tehran Times; Kayhan International, a Persian-language version of Kayhan published by the office of the Supreme Leader; Iran Daily, published by the administration's Islamic Republic News Agency; and Iran News, from Iran's Foreign Ministry.

== Closure ==
Tehran Bazaar, a digital media channel, received reports from journalists at the newspaper that the DEN Group, which owned the paper, had decided to close the paper on July 20 (the end of the Persian month), following declining subscription numbers.

Following the closure of the paper Berlin-based Bne IntelliNews entered into negotiations with the group to continue coverage of economic and macroeconomic news and data from Iran. As part of the deal several former staff members moved to the German agency.

== Ex-staffers ==
The newspaper has become the launching pad of several journalists in Iran and those who have moved abroad. Many of which have moved onto publications and television channels including Bne IntelliNews, BBC Monitoring, CGTN, Radio Free Europe/Radio Liberty, Al Jazeera and Al-Monitor.

== See also ==
- Economy of Iran
- Foreign direct investment in Iran
- Industry of Iran
- Institute of Standards and Industrial Research of Iran
- International rankings of Iran
- Media in Iran
- Privatization in Iran
- Science and technology in Iran
- Taxation in Iran
- Tehran International Fair
- Tehran Stock Exchange

== Financial Tribune news desks ==
- International (global) news
- National (Iran) news
- Iran Business & Markets news
- Iran Energy News
- Domestic Economy news
- Iran Auto news
- Iran Science & Technology news
- World (Global) Economy news
- Iran People news
- Iran Travel news
- Iran Environment news
- Iran Art and Culture news
