= Eftekhar =

- Type: Daily newspaper
- Language: Persian
- Headquarters: Iran

Eftekhar (Persian: افتخار, lit. 'Glory or Honor') is a Persian-language daily newspaper published in Iran. Mohammad Navidi-Kashani served as the managing director of the daily.

== See also ==
- List of newspapers in Iran
