= Donya-e-Eqtesad =

Iranian News Agency

Donya-e-Eqtesad Media Group
- Type: Daily newspaper
- Format: Broadsheet
- Owner(s): Alireza Bakhtiari
- Publisher: DEN Group
- Editor: Ali Farahbakhsh
- Staff writers: 200
- Founded: 2002; 23 years ago
- Political alignment: Center-right
- Language: Persian
- Headquarters: Tehran, Iran
- Circulation: 50,000
- Price: ~20 cents
- Sister newspapers: Financial Tribune (in English); Tejarat-e-Farda (in Persian)
- Website: www.donya-e-eqtesad.com

Donya-e-Eqtesad or Donya-ye Eqtesad (Persian: دنیای اقتصاد, lit. 'the World of Economics') is an Iranian daily newspaper. It is also a book publisher.

== History and profile ==
Maryam Mirzakhani's picture on the cover of Donya-e-Eqtesad newspaper

Donya-e-Eqtesad was founded in October 2002, and it has been published and circulated in Iran since then. This economic daily is among the most circulated newspapers in Iran. Donya-e-Eqtesad is considered to be an advocate of free markets, and does not have any formal affiliation with the government of Iran. It is a moderate critique of the government economic policies. Its main competitor was Sarmayeh newspaper.

Donya-e-Eqtesad regularly contains editorial articles, analytical comments about the domestic as well as the world's economy, industry and mines, international oil and energy markets, banking in Iran, commerce and tourism, and the latest news from Tehran Stock Exchange.

Donya-e-Eqtesad also publishes special reports on transportation and agriculture and covers the latest developments in oil exploration and exploitation operations as well as other related economic subjects.

== See also ==
- List of newspapers in Iran
- Economy of Iran
- Media of Iran
- Financial Tribune
