= Arash Vafadari =

Iranian businessman

Arash Vafadari (Persian: آرش وفاداری) is an Iranian businessman who returned to Iran after the 2000s. He is notable for being part of the first wave of returnees during the post Khatami period. He has been featured in the Persian language press including Tejarat-e-Farda. He is also known for speaking publicly on the business community in Iran, including the first EU-Iran Forum hosted in London. Vafadari has also become one of the main proponents of promoting post-sanctions investment in Iran appearing for comment in the Guardian Newspaper He is founder and chairman of the board on ManaPayam
