= Iran Sepid =

- Type: Daily newspaper (in Braille script)
- Format: Broadsheet
- Owner: Iranian Cultural Press Institute fa
- Founder: Fereydoun Varedi Nezhad fa
- President: Reza Darvish
- Language: Persian
- City: Tehran
- Country: Iran

Iran Sepid (Persian: ایران سپید; which means white Iran) is a special newspaper for the visually impaired, published in Persian and in Braille script in Tehran. It is owned by the Iranian Cultural Press Institute. The founder of this newspaper, which was first published on November 18, 1996, is Fereydoun Varedi Nezhad, who was the former managing director of the Islamic Republic News Agency (IRNA). It has been claimed that White Iran is considered as "the first braille newspaper in the world".
