= Hemmat (newspaper) =

Iranian newspaper

- Owner: Workers Unity Party
- Editor: Mahmoud Sayrafizadeh
- Founded: 1981
- Political alignment: Trotskyism
- Language: Persian
- Headquarters: Tehran, Iran

Hemmat (Persian: همت, lit. 'Determination') was a Persian-language weekly newspaper published in Teheran, Iran. Hemmat was the organ of the Workers Unity Party, and was founded in early 1981. Mahmoud Sayrafizadeh was the editor of Hemmat. Hemmat lacked legal authorization, but its circulation was tolerated by the authorities at the time.

== See also ==
- List of newspapers in Iran
