= Mana Neyestani =

Iranian cartoonist (born 1973)

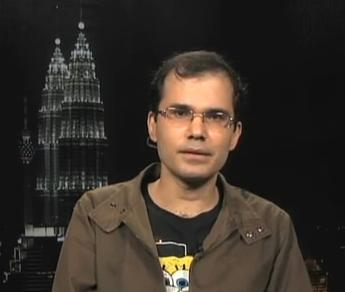
- Born: مانا نیستانی; 29 May 1973 (age 53) Tehran, Iran
- Areas: Cartoonist, Colourist
- Awards: Cartoonists Rights Network International award for courage in editorial cartooning, 2010
- Relatives: Touka Neyestani (brother)

Mana Neyestani (Persian: مانا نیستانی; born 29 May 1973) is an Iranian cartoonist, illustrator, and comic book creator whose work appears internationally in economic, intellectual, political, and cultural magazines. Mana is particularly known for his work for reformist papers in Iran and Persian language websites Deutsche Welle, Radio Zamaneh, Tavaana: E-Learning Institute for Iranian Civil Society, and IranWire. He is also well-known because of his cartoons about Iranian presidential election, 2009. He is the 2010 recipient of the Cartoonists Rights Network International Award for Courage in Editorial Cartooning. Mana lives in France.

== Early life ==
Mana was born in Tehran to an Iranian Azeri family. His father Manouchehr Neyestani (1936–1981) was a well-known Iranian poet from Kerman and his mother Azardokht Keshavarzi (1936–2021) was a high school teacher from Tehran. Touka Neyestani, a fellow cartoonist as well, is Mana's older brother. Mana has a master's degree in Architecture from the University of Tehran.

== Career ==
Mana began his professional cartooning career in 1989, and started drawing editorial cartoons in 1998, for Zan. During 1998-2000, he drew a large number of cartoons for various reformist newspapers, such as Asr-e Azadegan, Sobhe Emrooz, Mosharekat, Azad, Neshat (as a freelancer), and Aftab-e Emrooz (as a staff cartoonist). Mana also did many illustrations for kids magazines during his career including Doost magazine. He was in charge of the kids section of the nationwide published newspaper Iran for many years. His cartoons are published regularly on the website of Iranian exile media Radio Zamaneh, as well as Tavaana: E-Learning Institute for Iranian Civil Society and IranWire. In April 2025, during an interview with the magazine D+C - Development and Cooperation, Neyestani discussed the role of political satire under authoritarian governments, his experience of censorship and exile, as well as his use of social media to distribute cartoons internationally.

== Books ==
Mana has authored several books, mostly graphic novels. The Adventures of Mr Ka is his most famous comic book series, and consists of four books, all in Persian. Other books include:

- Kaboos ("Nightmare") was published in Iran in 2000
- Khaneh Ashbah ("The House of Ghosts") was published in Iran in 2001, and after it was banned in Iran, it was republished in the United States in 2014
- Puzzle Asheghaneh Aghai-e Ka ("The Love Puzzle of Mr Ka") was published in Iran in 2004, and after it was banned in Iran, it was republished in the United States in 2014
- Hogopsi was published in the United States in 2013
- An Iranian Metamorphosis (2014) is his autobiographical graphic novel. It was originally published in French, and later was published in German, Spanish and English.
- Trois Heures (2020), an autobiographical graphic novel about an incident at an airport in 2017, when Neyestani was prevented from boarding a flight to Canada because of difficulties involving his refugee travel document. Published by Éditions çà et là and ARTE Éditions.
- Les oiseaux de papier (2023), his first fictional graphic novel, set among kolbars, cross-border porters working in Iranian Kurdistan. Published by Éditions çà et là and ARTE Éditions.
- Shadi : une histoire du vol PS752 (2025), co-created with Shaghayegh Moazzami and Touka Neyestani, about the death of a young Iranian woman aboard Ukraine International Airlines Flight 752. Published by Éditions çà et là.

== Controversy ==
Riots erupted by ethnic Azerbaijanis in Iran when they took offense to a Neyestani cartoon published in the children's section of the 12 May 2006 supplement of Iran, a government-run newspaper. The cartoon depicted a cockroach responding in Azerbaijani. Mana and Mehrdad Ghasemfar (the editor-in-chief of Iran) were arrested by government officials and the newspaper was closed down following the riots.

Mana and the editor of the paper ended up in solitary confinement in Tehran's Evin prison under conditions the cartoonist described as "Kafkaesque." Three months later, Mana was given a temporary prison leave and used it to flee the country with his wife. He finally ended up in exile in France where he published a graphic novel titled An Iranian Metamorphosis, about his time in prison.

Mana clarified the use of the word that was interpreted as from the Azerbaijani language as slang in the Persian language and that he did not want to offend anyone with his cartoon.

== Awards ==
- 2012 International Cartoonist Award (presented by Freedom Cartoonists Foundation), 2012
- Award for courage in editorial cartooning (presented by Cartoonists Rights Network International), 2010
- 2nd award of housing in Tehran (1999)
- 2nd award of Atomic Bomb cartoon contest of Golagha magazine (1999)
- Diploma of honor of football international cartoon contest in Iran (1999)
- Diploma of honor of 4th biennial international cartoon in Iran (1999)
- Selected in section final of comic strip in Umoristi a Marostica in Italy (1999)
- First award of the press festival in cartoon in Iran (1999)
- 2nd award of blue-sky contest in Tehran (1998)
- 4th award of blue-sky contest in Tehran (1997)
