= Mahmudali Chehregani =

Iranian Azerbaijani political activist

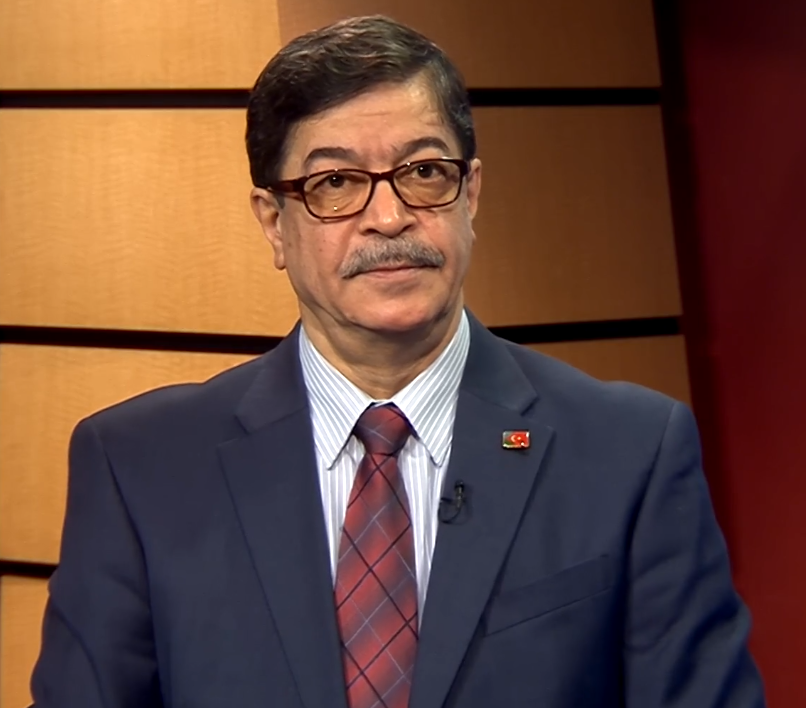

Personal details
- Born: 5 March 1958 (age 68) Shabestar, East Azerbaijan province, Iran

Mahmudali Chehregani (Azerbaijani: Mahmudəli Babaxan oğlu Çöhrəqanlı, Persian: محمود علی چهرگانی) (also known as Mahmudali Chohraganli) is an Iranian Azerbaijani political activist, born in Shabestar, East Azarbaijan Province, Iran, in 1958. After the expulsion of the South Azerbaijan National Liberation Movement) by Piruz Dilenchi, he founded the Southern Azerbaijan National Awakening Movement (SANAM or GAMOH), a political group that claims to represent the interests of Iran's estimated 12 to 18.5 million Azerbaijani minority (approximately 16-25 percent of Iran's all population). Chehregani was a professor of linguistics at Tabriz University.

Chehregani was supported by the United States during the Bush administration, according to William O. Beeman.

== Biography ==
Chehregani himself entered politics after his course teaching Turkish linguistics was closed by Iranian authorities. Chehregani was arrested by agents of Iran's Ministry of Intelligence in December 1999, effectively preventing him from registering as a candidate for the Majlis (Parliament) election within the specified time. He was tried by a revolutionary court on charges including smuggling shampoo, and sentenced on 18 February 2000 to six months' imprisonment. Amnesty International believed that "he has been imprisoned to suppress the non-violent expression of his conscientiously held beliefs, and as such was a prisoner of conscience".

Chehregani went on a hunger strike on 19 May, in protest against his unfair trial. He was transferred to the prison hospital on 23 July, suffering from internal bleeding, and subsequently released from Tabriz prison on 27 July 2000, after six months in detention, when his condition had stabilised. Iran lifted a travel ban on Chehregani in 2002, allowing him to meet with high-level government figures in Turkey and the United States. Since 2002 he lives in exile in the United States.

== Political views ==
=== Language and culture ===
Chehregani's campaign focused on issues of Iranian Azerbaijani self-determination. He has called for the teaching of the Azerbaijani language instead of Persian as the primary language in schools in Iranian Azerbaijan, arguing that it is guaranteed under Article 15 of the Constitution of the Islamic Republic of Iran, which permits the use of regional languages in the media and in schools when used in addition to Persian.

=== Irredentism ===
In his speech in Center for Strategic & International Studies in Washington, DC, Chehregani declared the goals of his movement as follows:

"We support the territorial integrity of Iran and do not seek unification with Republic of Azerbaijan or Turkey. We do not want to live under the Islamic regime; we want democracy in Iran. We envision Iran in a federalist form that respects the rights of Azerbaijani Turks."

However, Chehreganli has several times explained his objective was the absolute separation of Azerbaijan from Iran. Chehregani has previously affirmed many times that federalism is an excuse for separatism and that he is a separatist. He and his group have also set their aims on non-Azeri inhabited areas, specially areas inhabited by various ethnic groups including Kurds, Talysh and other Iranians. Chehregani also considers the predominantly non-Azerbaijani provinces as Hamadan and Qazvin as part of Azerbaijan. Chehregani, in an interview with GünAz TV, has claimed that he sees provinces which are not majority Azerbaijani, such as Qazvin, Tehran, Arak and parts of Gilan and Kordestan as part of Azerbaijani territory.

Chehregani also used the word "Fars Kupaklari" (Persian dogs) on multiple occasions to refer to Iranian Persians on CNN Türk.

=== Kurdish immigration ===
He and a group of Azerbaijani nationalists wrote a letter to then president Khatami asking him to limit Kurdish immigration to Azerbaijan from other regions of Iran and has called Kurds in Western Azerbaijan as the guests of Azerbaijanis. He considers the Kurds, who are not Azerbaijani Turks, as traitors and as guests in Azerbaijan and has recently claimed that "There are 500,000 Kurdish immigrants in Southern Azerbaijan. If they behave normally, there will be no problems, otherwise they will have to leave the same way as they came".

=== Iraq ===
He and his group has also advocated the invasion of Northern Iraq by Turkey and considers Mosul and Kirkuk to be ancient Turkish lands under Kurdish occupation.
