= Tejarat-e-Farda =

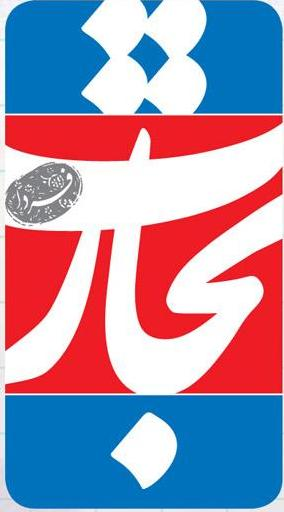
- Format: Tabloid
- Owner(s): Alireza Bakhtiari
- Publisher: DEN Group
- Editor-in-chief: Mohammad Taheri
- Staff writers: 200
- Founded: 2008
- Political alignment: Center right
- Language: Persian
- Headquarters: Tehran, Iran
- City: Tehran
- Country: Iran
- Circulation: 160,000
- Price: ~$1.40
- Sister newspapers: Donya-e-Eqtesad, Financial Tribune
- Website: tejarat.donya-e-eqtesad

Tejarat-e-Farda (Persian: تجارت فردا, lit. 'Tomorrow's Business') is a Persian-language weekly business magazine printed in the Islamic Republic of Iran. The weekly covers all political and economic events from the previous week, whilst also covering social and societal issues from the week previous. The weekly is often translated and quoted for its center right point of view. The magazine style format is popular among Iran's urban educated classes and covers national events with a business centric approach.

The magazine has been quoted in the international media, including the New York Times among some.

== History ==
The weekly magazine was launched in 2008, as part of Donya-e-Eqtesad business group of magazines.

== Notable interviews ==
The magazine often interviews leaders in Iran's business industry along with the occasional foreign interview translated into Persian, these include, Arash Vafadari, Gary Becker, Thomas Schelling, Mohammad Nahavandian among some.

== See also ==
- Economy of Iran
- Media in Iran
