= Kelid (newspaper) =

Defunct Iranian newspaper (2013–2021)

- Founded: 2013
- Ceased publication: 2021
- Language: Persian
- Headquarters: Tehran
- Country: Iran

Kelid (Persian: کلید, lit. 'Key') was a non-partisan Persian language newspaper established in 2013. It was banned in November 2021 by the government council for monitoring publication (composed of a justice of Iranian judiciary and Ministry of Islamic Culture and Guidance, Supreme Council of the Cultural Revolution, and Qom Seminary memberships). According to foreign and domestic press, it was banned for hinting at criticizing the Supreme leader for millions of Iranians being under the poverty line by using a photo of the bloody hand of Ali Khamenei on the front page. The owners were charged.

== See also ==
- Kayhan London
- Installation art
- List of newspapers in Iran
