= Iran (newspaper) =

Iranian newspaper

- Type: Daily newspaper
- Format: Tabloid
- Owner: Islamic Republic News Agency
- Publisher: Islamic Republic News Agency
- Editor: Hadi KhosroShahin
- Staff writers: 800
- Founded: 1995; 31 years ago
- Language: Persian
- Headquarters: Khoramshahr Street, Sohrevardi Street, Tehran, Iran
- Circulation: 165,000 Daily (2015)
- ISSN: 1027-1449
- Website: www.irannewspaper.ir

Iran (Persian: ایران) is a Persian-language and the official daily newspaper of the government of Iran.

== Profile ==
Iran was launched in 1995. The Islamic Republic News Agency (IRNA) owns and publishes Iran. Iran's affiliated website is Iran Network. IRNA also publishes Iran Daily, an English-language daily newspaper, Alvefagh, an Arabic newspaper, Irane varzeshi, a sport daily newspaper, and Irane Sepid for blind people. The newspaper supports the policies of the government and is described as a pro-government conservative daily.

The daily was managed by Mosayeb Naeemi during the presidency of Mahmoud Ahmadinejad. Following the 2013 presidential election Mohammad Taqi Roghaniha, CEO of Iran Cultural and Press Institute (ICPI), was appointed manager of the daily.

== Bans ==
Iran was closed down by the Press Supervisory Board in May 2006 following its publication a caricature which was deemed to be "divisive and provocative". The caricature which mocked Azeris caused stir among Azeri people living in the country. In response both the artist who had drawn the caricature and the editor-in-chief were arrested. The paper was banned again for six months by an Iranian court due to its alleged false report in June 2013.

== Social Network ==
This newspaper joined the Twitter social network as one of the Iranian newspapers in October 2016 and has since started publishing the newspaper's news and articles on this social network. The Iran Newspaper account was officially approved by Twitter in November 2016. As of February 1, 2019, the number of followers of this account has reached 104,700.

== IRAN News Network (INN) ==
"Iran Network Website" was an Iranian news website owned by the Iranian Cultural and Press Institute that operated from 2007 to the end of 2013. Nearly 30 people worked on this website. According to Alexa data, the website's URL, inn.ir, ranked 674th among the most visited Iranian websites.

== The presidency of Mahmoud Ahmadinejad ==
Khatoon's special issue controversy Following the publication of a 258-page special issue of the Iran newspaper called "Vijehnameh Khatoon 1" in August 2011, a number of political activists accused the authors of this special issue of questioning the black veil, which in the Islamic Republic of Iran is referred to as the "superior Islamic veil."

The most newsworthy article published in this special issue was an interview with Mehdi Kalhor, who considered the black color of the veil to be an imitation of the black clothing worn by Western men and women in the "nightly orgy parties of Europe" during the time of Nasser al-Din Shah, and said: "In terms of the philosophy of hijab, which states in the Quran that a woman should not expose herself to the gaze of men, the veil is definitely the worst form of clothing because it frames a woman's face."

== Attack on Iranian newspaper office ==
After Ali Akbar Javanfekr, the then-director of Iran, was sentenced to one year in prison on November 20, 2011, she held a press conference at the Iran newspaper's office, repeating her statements in an interview with Etemad newspaper and protesting the verdict.

On the same day, security agents from the Tehran Prosecutor's Office raided the Iran newspaper building and arrested Ali Akbar Javanfekr. The attempt to arrest him was met with resistance from some of Iran newspaper's employees, and Mosayeb Naeimi, the editor-in-chief of Al-Wefaq newspaper, and 39 journalists and employees of Iran newspaper were arrested. Abdolreza Soltani, an IRNA political correspondent who had come to the Iran newspaper office to cover the news, was beaten by the agents and his condition was reported to be critical. All of Iran newspaper's files and documents were also seized.

Abbas Jafari Dolatabadi, the Prosecutor General of Tehran, said about the arrest of Ali Akbar Javanfekr: "Following Ali Akbar Javanfekr's interview with one of the country's newspapers on Saturday and raising untrue and divisive issues, it was learned that The person in question, intends to repeat these statements by holding a press conference on Monday. According to the report received, unfortunately, despite his claim of legality, Javanfekr resisted the judicial order and the officers' actions and, by making phone calls and being present among the employees of the institution, provoked the employees and caused disruption and disorder in the newspaper's work process. After these incidents, the officers left the area on the prosecutor's order."

Ali Akbar Javanfekr also said after the arrest: "The actions of these people made my colleagues at Iran Newspaper extremely angry, and the prosecutor's forces threw tear gas into the building and tried to enter. They arrested a number of Iran Newspaper journalists and took them away, and they shocked one of my colleagues with an electric shock, and now he is not in a good condition.

After Mahmoud Ahmadinejad protested this arrest, Javanfekr was released. After these attacks, the Irannewspaper published a white headline in protest of Javanfekr's arrest. Reporters Without Borders also condemned the closure of the Etemad newspaper and the arrest of Iran newspaper staff

== See also ==
- List of newspapers in Iran
- Mass media in Iran
