= Khabar-e Jonub =

Persian-language newspaper in Iran

Khaber-e Jonub (Persian: خبر جنوب, lit. 'The South News') is a Persian-language daily newspaper published in Shiraz, Iran.
