= Yas-e No =

Defunct newspaper in Iran (2002–2009)

- Founded: March 2002
- Ceased publication: 11 June 2009
- Political alignment: Reformism (Iranian)
- Language: Persian
- Headquarters: Tehran
- Country: Iran

Yas-e No (Persian: یاس نو, lit. 'New Yasmine') was a reformist daily newspaper in Tehran, Iran, unofficially an outlet of the Islamic Iran Participation Front. The paper was in circulation between 2002 and 2009 with long interruptions.

== History and profile ==
Yas-e No was launched in March 2002. On 19 February 2004, the Iranian judiciary banned the newspaper, perhaps temporarily, only one day before the parliamentary election, after the paper published an open letter from some members of the outgoing parliament to Ayatollah Khamenei, the Supreme Leader. The letter was read to journalists by Mohsen Armin, one of the organizers of the sit-in by MPs criticizing the vetting of candidates by the Council of Guardians. Saeed Mortazavi, Tehran's general prosecutor, announced that he had ordered the ban because of a request by the Supreme National Security Council. Hassan Rouhani, then the council's chair, and Mohammad Khatami, the then president, denied this assertion on 20 and 23 February, respectively, saying that the matter was not even discussed at the council's meeting.

After five-year ban the paper was allowed to publish in May 2009. However, following the presidential election the paper was again banned on 11 June 2009.

== See also ==
- List of newspapers in Iran
