= Nazila Fathi =

Iranian-Canadian author

- Born: 28 December 1970 (age 55); Tehran, Iran
- Education: University of Toronto
- Website: www.nazilafathi.com

Nazila Fathi (born December 28, 1970) is an Iranian-Canadian author and former Teheran correspondent for The New York Times. She also reported on Iran for both Time and Agence France-Presse. In her book The Lonely War, she interweaves her personal history with that of Iran, from the 1979 Revolution until, when continuing to report from Iran became life-threatening in 2009, she was forced into exile.

== Biography ==
Fathi was born in Tehran in 1970. Her father was a senior civil servant in the Ministry of Energy. She studied English at Azad University, and while there began working as a translator for foreign reporters. From that beginning, she became a stringer for The New York Times, Time, and Agence France-Presse.

Frustrated by the Iranian government's multi-year press accreditation process, Fathi moved to Canada in 1999 and became a Canadian citizen. She earned an MA in political science and women's studies from the University of Toronto in 2001 before returning to Tehran as a correspondent for The New York Times.

During the 2009 Iranian presidential election protests, Fathi and other journalists reported on the violence by the Iranian government against peaceful protestors. In early 2009, the Iranian government banned international journalists from covering the protests, but Fathi continued to report. Other journalists were arrested by Iranian authorities. Fathi was placed under surveillance by the government, and threats were made against her life. In July 2009, she and her family left Iran for Canada.

She subsequently became an associate at Harvard's Belfer Center, a Nieman Fellow, and a Shorenstein Fellow.

Fathi's book The Lonely War was published by Basic Books in November 2014 and received international recognition.

== Bibliography ==
=== Nonfiction ===
- Lonely War: One Woman's Account of the Struggle for Modern Iran (2014)

=== Children's books ===
- My Name Is Cyrus (2020)
- Avicenna: The Father of Modern Medicine (2020)
- Razi: The Man Who Discovered How to Make Alcohol (2021)
- The Persian Warrior and Her Queen (2021)
