= GünAz TV =

Azerbaijani television channel

- GünAz TV logo
- Broadcast area: Europe, West Asia, North Africa, Central Asia
- Headquarters: Chicago, United States

Programming
- Language: Azerbaijani

Ownership
- Owner: Ahmad Obali

History
- Launched: 2004

Links
- Webcast: gunaz.tv/az/live-tv/
- Website: gunaz.tv

GünAz TV (Iranian Azerbaijani: گون‌آذ تی‌وی) is an Azerbaijani-language television channel based in Chicago and broadcasting in Europe, West Asia, North Africa, and Central Asia. It is run by Ahmad Obali, who founded it in 2004. Ideologically, the television channel promotes a pan-Turkist viewpoint and supports ethnic Azerbaijani separatism in Iran.

== History ==
The channel has its origins in 2004, when Ahmad Obali founded it with the self-proclaimed purpose of protecting the rights of Iranian Azerbaijanis. It seeks peaceful and cultural action against racism and discriminatory government policies in Iran. It was given the name GünAz, a portmanteau made up from "Güney Azərbaycan" (Iranian Azerbaijani: گونئی آذربایجان), which translates to "South Azerbaijan", a term used by Azerbaijani irridentists to describe Iranian Azerbaijan. In explaining his and his colleagues' goals, Ahmad Obali explained:

“Our activists want an independent South Azerbaijan because we will do much better once we are independent. We can move toward a union with North Azerbaijan, join the Council of Europe, and embrace Western values."

The overwhelming majority of the channel's content has been anti-Iranian, with a 2014 study by an Iranian-Azerbaijani researcher finding that 86.64% of all programs broadcast on the channel have been aimed at portraying Iran negatively, without a single one portraying it positively.

In 2006, it was banned from broadcasting via Türksat in response to an Iranian complaint following the channel's calling on Iranian Azerbaijanis to engage in terrorism against the state during the 2006 protests in Iran, as well as a Turkish state investigation that concluded foreign intelligence agencies were behind its operation. From that point on, the channel has broadcast only from TelStar and Hot bird satellites. Reportedly, the loss of their ability to use Türksat heavily reduced the channel's viewership within Iran.

In 2019, GünAz TV played a role in the spreading the story of Zahra Navidpour's alleged rape by Iranian MP Salman Khodadadi by publishing an interview with her. The interview included several audio files that were claimed to be evidence of sexual assault. Khodadadi rejected the accusations made by her in the interview and was later tried and acquitted of charges by the Supreme Court.

== Funding ==
According to Obali, GünAz TV receives all of its funding from viewer donations, being entirely independent of any governmental support. However, it has never publicly disclosed its financial resources or sources of funding.

The government-backed Congress of World Azerbaijanis have also supported the channel. Asides from the Azerbaijani government, Turkey accused the American Central Intelligence Agency (CIA) of renting the satellite channels used to host GünAz in 2006.

== Controversy ==
=== Racism against Kurds and Persians ===
Numerous articles on their website and statements during broadcasts have expressed racist views towards the ethnically Kurdish population of West Azerbaijan province. Their website regularly publishes articles calling Kurds primitive, criminal, and inclined towards terrorism.

=== CIA connections ===
According to a 2006 article by the Hürriyet newspaper, following a complaint about GünAz TV from the Iranian foreign ministry, the Turkish government launched an investigation into the channel. As a result of the technical analysis, It was discovered that the United States' Central Intelligence Agency had been renting channels from Türksat, including the ones used for GünAz TV and a Kurdish separatist channel, with the purpose of broadcasting anti-government propaganda activities into Iran. This resulted in the channel being banned from broadcasting via Turkey.

=== Assault on Obali ===
On 20 May 2023, reports came out claiming that GünAz TV owner Ahmad Obali had been hospitalized, following a heavy beating that caused him to have to be attached to a breathing device. The prominent Azerbaijani Yeni Müsavat newspaper suggested that it was the work of Iranian intelligence, and Azerbaijani Member of Parliament Fazil Mustafa threatened Iran with retaliation. Other Azerbaijani news media, including modern.az and AzerNews, blamed 'Armenian terrorist groups' for the assault. However, the San Jose police department’s office of chief of police issued a press release, revealing that Obali identified his son Deniz Obali, who had been booked at the Santa Clara County Main Jail for attempted murder, as the person responsible for assaulting him.
