= Nashriya-i Madrasa-i Mubaraka-i Dar al-Funun-i Tabriz =

1893 Persian-language journal

Našrīya-i Madrasa-i Mubāraka-i Dār al-Funūn-i Tabrīz
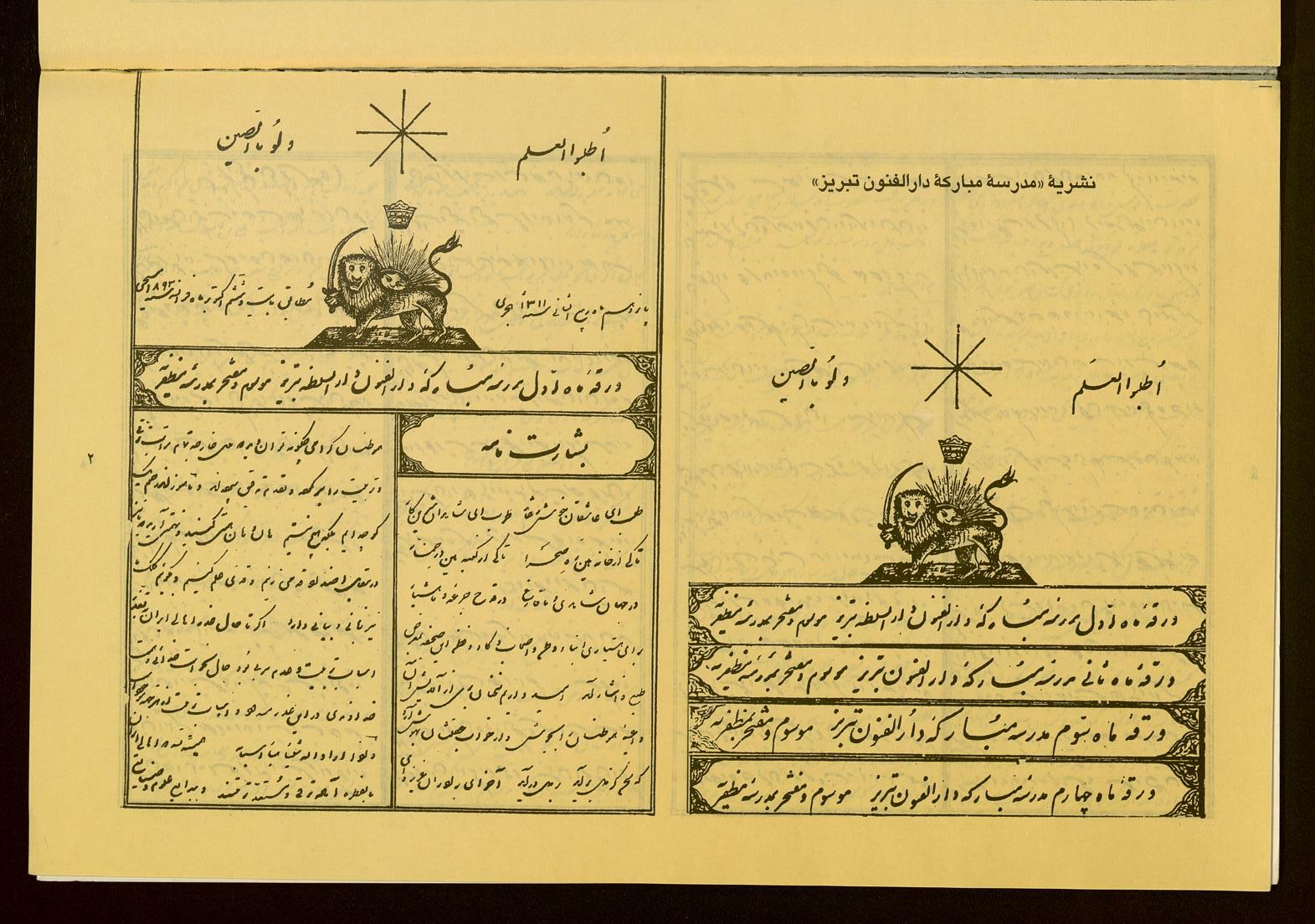
- Categories: Economy and technology
- Frequency: Monthly
- Publisher: Madrasa-i Mubāraka-i Dār al-Funūn
- First issue: 1893
- Final issue: 1894
- Country: Iran
- Based in: Tabriz
- Language: Persian
- Website: Našrīya-i Madrasa-i Mubāraka-i Dār al-Funūn-i Tabrīz

The Persian-language magazine Nashriya-i Madrasa-i Mubaraka-i Dar al-Funun-i Tabriz (نشریه مدرسه مبارکه دارالفنون تبریز; DMG: Našrīya-i Madrasa-i Mubāraka-i Dār al-Funūn-i Tabrīz) was published in Tabriz from 1893 to 1894. It was printed monthly in a total of four issues. In terms of content, the journal was specialised in distributing topics like the technical production and the economy of Tabriz.
