= Ali Akbar Javanfekr =

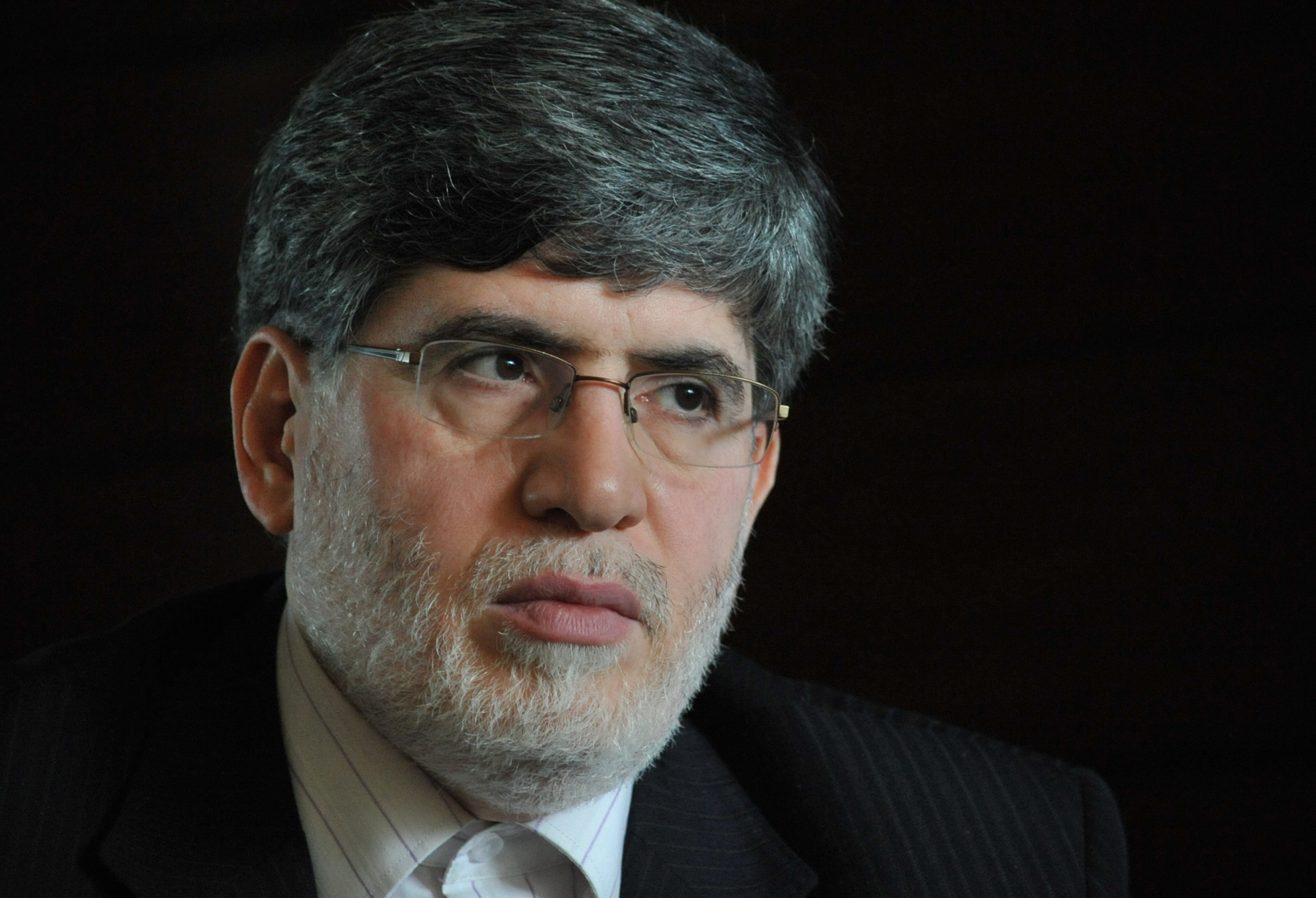

Personal details
- Born: June 12, 1959 (age 66) Tehran, Iran
- Website: IRNA

Ali Akbar Javanfekr (Persian: علی‌اکبر جوانفکر) (born 12 June 1959) is a senior Iranian politician and the presidential advisor for press affairs and as of 19 December 2010, he is the Managing-Director of IRNA since 1 November 2010 On 20 November 2011, he was sentenced to a year in prison on charges of "publishing materials contrary to Islamic norms"; this was later upheld by the court.

== Career ==
As chief executive of the official Islamic Republic News Agency (IRNA), Javanfekr was reportedly "one of the most powerful figures in publicizing Iran's government policies and messages to the outside world". In December 2010, he led a delegation to Pakistan to discuss the use of media in reducing extremism. In March 2009, as an aide to president Ahmadinejad, he urged the US "to end sanctions and drop its support for Israel."

== Arrest and case ==
On 20 November 2011, Javanfekr was sentenced to a year in jail and suspended from journalism for three years for "publishing materials contrary to Islamic norms", questioning the Islamic Republic's compulsory dress code for women. Javanfekr had been put on trial after the publication of a series of articles about the chador, a traditional hijab garment that covers Iranian women from head to toe. In one article, Ahmadinejad's former media adviser, Mehdi Kalhor, "criticised the black colour of Iranian chadors, saying they did not originate from the Persian culture but were rather imported from the west."

He has a "few weeks" to appeal the sentence and is expected to do so.

On 21 November 2011, he was handcuffed in a raid on his office in Tehran, in which tear gas was used. At least 32 other people were also arrested. He was later released.

In a statement to IRNA Javanfekr complained

"They arrested some of our reporters and took them away and hit one of my colleagues with an electric baton. My colleagues were traumatised, some of them were hurt … I'm a representative of the government and the president's adviser … If they had summoned me, I would have gone to them. They did not need to do these kind of actions."

His arrest "appears" to be as a result of the court ruling, but according to The New York Times, may be in retaliation for an interview given by Javanfekr to the reformist newspaper Etemad, on 19 November, "in which he disparaged" some of Pres. Ahmadinejad's "conservative rivals. In response to interview questions about "the recent power struggle, Javanfekr said the president has come 'to serve the people' and 'will stay till the end, till martyrdom'". Etemad was immediately ordered closed for two months for 'disseminating lies and insults to officials in the establishment.'

Javanfekr is reportedly one of "dozens of President Mahmoud Ahmadinejad's political backers to be targeted by hard-line opponents." He has also been called "one of the few who have stood firm behind Mahmoud Ahmadinejad during the president's power struggle with conservatives." According to the AP news service, his arrest "appears to be part of an internal power struggle over influencing upcoming elections for parliament", slated for March 2012.

Javanfekr is at present (27 February 2012) Presidential Advisor of Press Affairs and according to IRNA heads the official Islamic Republic News Agency and the Iran Press and Cultural Institute affiliated to IRNA.
