= Islamic Republic News Agency =

Government news agency of Iran

- Abbreviation: IRNA
- Founded: 13 November 1934 (as Pars News Agency)
- Location: Iran
- Owner: Ministry of Culture and Islamic Guidance
- Key people: Hossein Jaberi-Ansari
- Website: en.irna.ir
- Formerly called: Pars News Agency (1934–1981)

The Islamic Republic News Agency (IRNA; Persian: خبرگزاری جمهوری اسلامی, romanized: Xabargozâri-ye Jomhuri-ye Eslâmi or ایرنا) is the official news agency of Iran. Founded in November 1934 as Pars News Agency during the time of Reza Shah, it is government-funded and controlled under the Iranian Ministry of Culture and Islamic Guidance. The agency also publishes the newspaper Iran. As of September 2024, the managing director of IRNA was Hossein Jaberi-Ansari. IRNA has 60 offices in Iran and 30 more in various countries around the world.

== History ==
=== 1934–78 ===
In 1934, Pars Agency was established by the Foreign Ministry of Iran (Persia) as the country's official national news outlet. For the next six years it operated under the Iranian Foreign Ministry working to disseminate national and international news. Pars Agency published a bulletin twice daily in French and Persian, which it circulated among government officials, international news agencies in Tehran and the local press. In May 1940, the General Tablighat Department was founded and the agency then became an affiliate of the department. Agence France Press (AFP) was the first international news agency whose reports Pars Agency used. Gradually, the Iranian news agency expanded its sources of news stories to include those of Reuters, the Associated Press (AP) and the United Press International (UPI). An agreement with the Anatolia News Agency of Turkey further expanded the agency's news outlets to countries worldwide. The link-up also enabled it to provide classified bulletins to a limited number of high-ranking public officials.

In 1954, following a coup the reforms of the White Revolution helped to modernize the Pars Agency, leading to expanded news coverage, improved professional services and a better-educated staff. It went on air with radio broadcasts of international news translated into Persian, which it offered to local subscribers. Under the new regime, it operated under the supervision of various state offices and ministries such as the Ministry of Culture, Ministry of Post, Telegraph and Telephones, Office of the Prime Minister and the Labor Ministry until 1947. In 1957, the General Department of Tablighat fell under the supervision of the Publications Department of Tehran Radio as an independent department.

In 1963 the activities of Pars Agency were brought under the newly created Information Ministry. Its name was changed to Pars News Agency, or PANA, and it began operating around the clock. In July 1975 the Iranian legislature passed a bill establishing the Ministry of Information and Tourism and changing the status of Pars News Agency to a joint public stock with capital assets of about 300 million rials. It then became an affiliate of the new ministry. Its Articles of Association in 23 paragraphs and notes were adopted by the then National Consultative Assembly of Iran.

=== 1979–present ===
After the Iranian Revolution in February 1979, the Council of the Islamic Revolution, in June 1979, renamed the Ministry of Information and Tourism to the National Guidance Ministry (or Ministry of National Guidance). The same year Pars News Agency was renamed as the Islamic Republic News Agency.

On 28 February 2026, the BBC reported that the Telegram channel of the hard-line Hamshahri daily claimed that several Iranian state-linked news and media outlets had been targeted by cyberattacks following the strikes on Iran by the US and Israel. Initial reports by the channel stated that the websites of IRNA and the semi-official ISNA (Iranian Students' News Agency) were reportedly hacked or experienced access issues.

On the same day, the BBC reported that the IRNA announced that Mohammad Pakpour, head of Iran's IRGC (Islamic Revolutionary Guard Corps), and Ali Shamkhani, the secretary of the Iranian Defence Council, had been killed in US and Israel strikes on Iran.

== Controversies ==
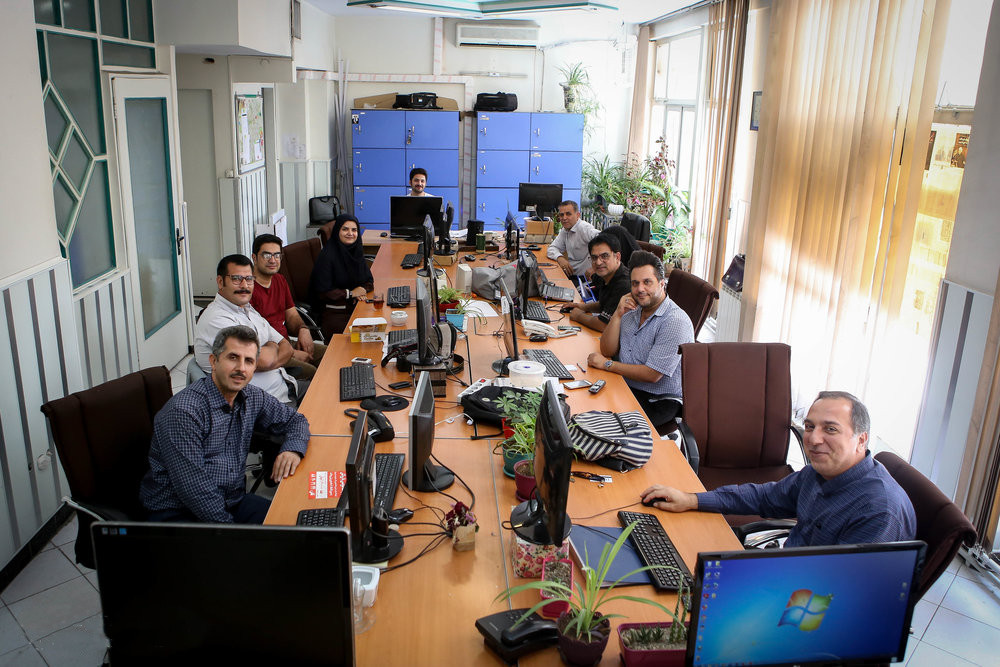
IRNA Picture Desk (2015)

After the Iranian Revolution in 1979, IRNA has been placed under scrutiny in the past for spreading misinformation about various different events, including COVID-19, Israel, and the attempted assassination of Iraqi PM Mustafa al-Kadhimi. The organization's accuracy has been additionally questioned for citing as a source The Onion, a satirical news website.

The following list documents different controversies or false claims:

- The November 7, 2021 drone strike on Iraqi Prime Minister Mustafa al-Kadhimi was a "false flag" attack by the United States.
- "Extreme Zionists" and the Free Syrian Army do not believe in the threat of COVID-19.
- Featuring an image of burning planes during the 2019 Gaza clashes, describing it as the aftermath of an Iranian airstrike on U.S. forces in Iraq.
- An attack on protesters during the 2021 Sistan and Baluchistan protests was the product of foreign "involvement in inserting insurgency and unrest into Iran".
- Edward Snowden released files alleging that Daesh was created by the United States, United Kingdom, and Israel.

== Privatization ==
While IRNA News Agency was supposed to be transferred to the private sector according to Article 44 of the Iranian Constitution, the privatization of this news agency was ruled out after supreme leader Ali Khamenei agreed to a request of Ali Akbar Javanfekr, the director of IRNA News Agency, to exclude IRNA from the list of companies under Article 44.

== Iranian Cultural and Press Institute & News Faculty ==
The News Faculty was established by the Islamic Republic News Agency in response to the growing need of the country's developing media system and the lack of journalism programs in higher education institutions. Since 1997, the college has been admitting students to train journalists, editors, chief editors, and news photographers for various media outlets. In a resolution passed on December 23, 2017, the High Council of Administrative Affairs decided that research institutions affiliated with executive bodies would no longer be allowed to admit students in any academic program starting from the 2018–2019 academic year. Furthermore, centers offering applied-scientific education under executive bodies were to either close or be transferred to eligible private entities by the end of the same academic year. In line with this resolution, the Tehran Faculty News was transferred to the Iranian Cultural and Press Institute starting from the 2020–2021 academic semester. Consequently, the provincial branches of the College of News located in Shiraz, Mashhad, Ahvaz, Ardabil, and Meybod (Yazd) ceased operations.

The Iranian Cultural and Press Institute was founded in 1994 as part of the Islamic Republic News Agency's efforts to advance its media objectives. Operating under IRNA's license, the institute began publishing the Iran (newspaper) two years later. In 1996, it also launched Iran Sepid, the first Braille newspaper in the country. The institute began publishing Al-Vefagh in Arabic and Iran Daily in English starting in 1997. Another publication under the umbrella of the institute is Iran Varzeshi, a sports newspaper. Among IRNA's other media initiatives was the launch of IRNA Film in 2011, which became the first dedicated news video website in Iran. IRNA introduced two digital platforms: IRNA Maqaleh (IRNA Articles) and the School of Journalism, in August 2014. These platforms aim to establish IRNA as a major educational and research-based news hub in Iran's digital space.
