= Khordad (newspaper) =

Khordad (Persian: خرداد, romanized: Khordād / Xordād) was a Persian-language newspaper published in Tehran, Iran. It was available between 1998 and 1999. Considered to be a liberal reformist newspaper, its title was a reference to the "2nd of Khordad Movement", the Iranian reform movement. The word 'Khordad' is the New Persian continuation of Middle Persian Hordad, from Avestan Haurvatat "wholeness."

== History and profile ==
Khordad was established in 1998. Its founder and publisher was Abdollah Noori. It was shut down by Iran Special Clerical Court in November 1999, and its publisher and editor-in-chief, Abdollah Noori, was sentenced to jail for five years on 27 November 1999. Khordad was based in Tehran.

== See also ==
- List of newspapers in Iran
