= Gozaresh (magazine) =

Gozaresh (Persian: گزارش, lit. 'Report') is a Persian-language magazine published in Tehran, Iran. The magazine is published on a monthly basis. It is about politics, economics and society. Its editor-in-chief is Abolghasem Golbaf.
