= Mass media in Iran =

The mass media in Iran is both privately and publicly owned but all channels are subject to censorship. In 2016, Iran had 178 newspapers, 83 magazines, 15,000 information sites and two million blogs. The Islamic Revolutionary Court has authority to monitor the print media and may suspend publication or revoke the licenses of papers or journals that a jury finds guilty of publishing material deemed anti-religious, slanderous or detrimental to the national interest.

The Mass Media Regulatory Authority Organization is one of the main regulatory controllers of mass media in Iran.

== Newspapers ==
Most Iranian newspapers are published in Persian, but newspapers in English and other languages also exist. The most widely circulated periodicals are based in Tehran. Popular daily and weekly newspapers include Iran, Ettelaat, Kayhan, Hamshahri and Resalat. Iran Daily and Tehran Times are both English language papers. Iran’s largest media corporation is Islamic Republic of Iran Broadcasting (IRIB). The Financial Tribune is the main (online) English language economic journal. Iran Front Page (IFP News) is an English News website which provides its audiences with the English version of the latest news and views from Iran published by the Iranian Persian-language media.

== Foreign broadcasts ==
A number of foreign broadcasts are transmitted into the country, including Persian language programmes from BBC Persian TV, Kol Israel and Radio Farda; however, these broadcasts are occasionally countered by radio jamming. The government engages in censorship programs with respect to anything that diverges from national laws and regulations. The majority of Iranians—upwards of 80 percent—get their news from government-owned media. Attempts to establish private, independent media outlets in Iran have been restricted or quashed, and Reporters Without Borders has declared Iran to have the highest number of jailed journalists in the Middle East. Under the 1979 Iranian Constitution, all broadcasting must exclusively be government-operated and, in 1994, the Islamic Republic banned the use of satellite television. In spite of which, over 30 percent of Iranians do in fact watch satellite television channels.

Iranian media include Iranian news agencies, Iranian newspapers, Iranian blogs, Persian-language magazines and Persian-language television stations (not all of which are actually Iranian).

== See also ==
- Blogging in Iran
- Cinema of Iran
- Communications and Internet in Iran
- Islamic Republic of Iran Broadcasting
- International Rankings of Iran in Communication
- Ministry of Culture and Islamic Guidance
- Propaganda in Iran
- Television in Iran
