= Iranian Azerbaijanis =

Turkic ethnic group

ایران آذربایجانلیلاری
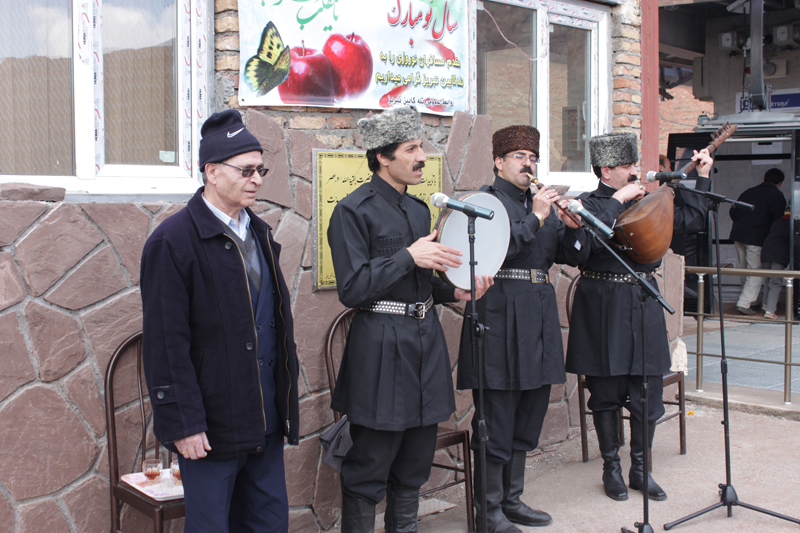
- Iranian Azerbaijani folk singers from Tabriz celebrating Nowruz

Regions with significant populations
- East Azerbaijan; West Azerbaijan; Ardabil; Zanjan; Qazvin; Hamadan; Internal migration: Tehran; Alborz; Qom; Minority: Markazi; Gilan; Kurdistan; Kermanshah; Golestan
- Iran: 15–23 million 16–24% of Iran's population
- Turkey: 530,000
- Azerbaijan: 248,000
- Canada: 50,000–60,000

Languages
- Azerbaijani; Persian; Turkish

Religion
- predominantly Shi'a Islam

Iranian Azerbaijanis (Note: [iˈɾɑːn ɑːzæɾbɑjˈdʒɑnlɯlɑɾɯ]; Azerbaijani: ایران آذربایجانلیلاری; Persian: آذربایجانی‌های ایران; also known as Iranian Azeris, Iranian Turks (Azerbaijani: İran Azərbaycanlıları), Persian Turks, or Persian Azerbaijanis) are a Turkic ethnic group native to the Iranian Azerbaijan region (including provinces of East Azerbaijan, Ardabil, Zanjan and West Azerbaijan). They also live in smaller numbers in other provinces, such as Kurdistan, Qazvin, Hamadan, Gilan, Markazi and Kermanshah. Iranian Azerbaijanis constitute the largest ethnic minority in Iran and make up significant minorities in Tehran, Karaj, and elsewhere in Iran. Most Iranian Azerbaijanis are bilingual in Azerbaijani and Persian.

== Demographics ==
Azerbaijanis comprise the largest minority ethnic group in Iran. Apart from Iranian Azerbaijan (provinces of West Azerbaijan, East Azerbaijan, Ardabil and Zanjan), Azerbaijani populations are found in large numbers in four other provinces: Hamadan (includes other Turkic ethnic groups such as Afshar, Gharehgozloo, Shahsevan, and Baharloo), Qazvin, Markazi, and Kurdistan. Azerbaijani-populated of Markazi province includes some parts and villages of Komijan, Khondab, Saveh, Zarandieh, Shazand, and Farahan. In Kurdistan, Azerbaijanis are mainly found in villages around Qorveh.

Azerbaijanis have also immigrated and resettled in large numbers in Central Iran, mainly Tehran, (Note: Some estimates have suggested that one-third of the population of Tehran is Azeri, the Iranologist Victoria Arakelova however notes in peer-reviewed journal Iran and the Caucasus that the wide-spread "cliché" among residents of Tehran on the number of Azerbaijanis in the city ("half of Tehran consists of Azerbaijanis"), cannot be taken "seriously into consideration". Arakelova adds that the number of Tehran's inhabitants who have migrated from northwestern areas of Iran, who are currently Persian-speakers "for the most part", is not more than "several hundred thousands", with the maximum being one million.) Qom and Karaj. They have also emigrated and resettled in large numbers in Khorasan. Immigrant Azerbaijani communities have been represented by people prominent not only among urban and industrial working classes but also in commercial, administrative, political, religious, and intellectual circles.

Scholars put the population of Azerbaijanis in Iran between 10 and 23 million. Iranologist Victoria Arakelova believes that political doctrines following the dissolution of the Soviet Union caused the inflation of the Iranian Azerbaijani as almost half of the 60 million Iranian population, which later decreased to 20 million, lingering for a while. She puts the number at 6 to 6.5 million.

=== Ethnic groups ===
Sub-ethnic groups of the Azerbaijanis within the modern-day borders of Iran following the ceding of the Caucasus to Russia in the 19th century, include the Shahsevan, the Qarapapaqs, the Ayrums, the Bayat, the Qajars, the Qaradaghis, and the Gharagozloo.

== Background ==
The Iranian Azerbaijani culture was produced by centuries of a symbiosis and mixture between native and nomadic elements. According to Richard Frye, Iranian Azerbaijanis largely descend from the pre-existing local Iranian population who was gradually Turkified following the major influx of Oghuz nomads into the region. Olivier Roy writes that the Azerbaijani ethnogenesis entailed the Turkification of the natives by Turkomans and the rise of Shiite identity and Turkic tongue. According to Russian scholar Rostislav Rybakov, Iranian Azerbaijan was almost fully Turkicized by 14th and 15th centuries, though the local population left its mark in the Azerbaijani culture and language and the ethnic border between the Turkish people and Azerbaijanis was established in the 16th century. Scholars note cultural similarities between modern Persians and Azerbaijanis.

=== Genetics ===
A 2007 study of human leukocyte antigen (HLA) class II variation found no significant genetic differences between Iranian Azerbaijanis and other major ethnic groups in Iran, nor any close genetic relationship with populations from Turkey or Central Asia. A comparative study conducted in 2013 of complete mitochondrial DNA diversity among Iranians indicated that Iranian Azerbaijanis occupied an intermediate genetic position between Azerbaijanis from Azerbaijan and other populations in the Caucasus, including Georgians and Armenians.

A 2017 study of HLA alleles placed Iranian Azerbaijanis within a Mediterranean genetic cluster alongside Kurds, Georgians, Chuvash, and other Iranian and Caucasian populations. The study also places Iranian Azerbaijanis in an intermediate position between Mediterranean and Central Asian populations, suggesting that migrations of Oghuz Turkic tribes likely contributed to their genetic ancestry. Several genetic studies indicate that the gene pool of Azerbaijanis substantially overlaps with those of neighboring populations, supporting a theory of language replacement through elite dominance, while also demonstrating genetic contributions associated with East Eurasian populations.

== History ==
=== Background ===
Following the Russo-Persian Wars of 1804–13 and 1826–28, the Caucasian territories of Qajar Iran were ceded to the Russian Empire. The Treaty of Gulistan in 1813 and the Treaty of Turkmenchay in 1828 finalized the borders between the Russian Empire and Qajar Iran. The areas to the north of the river Aras, including the territory of the contemporary Republic of Azerbaijan, were Iranian territory until they were occupied by Russia over the course of the 19th century.

As a direct result of Qajar Iran's forced ceding to Russia, the Azerbaijanis are nowadays parted between two nations: Iran and Azerbaijan. Despite living on two sides of an international border, the Azerbaijanis form a single ethnic group.

=== Russo-Persian War (1826–28) ===
The burden of the Russo-Persian War (1826–28) was on the tribes of Qaradağ region, who being in front line, provided human resources and provision of the Iranian army. In the wake of the war, a significant fraction of the inhabitants of this area lived as nomadic tribes (ایلات). The major tribes included; Cilibyanlu 1,500 tents and houses, Karacurlu 2500, Haji Alilu 800, Begdillu 200, and various minor groups 500. At the time Ahar, with 3,500 inhabitants, was the only city of Qaradağ.

=== Persian Constitutional Revolution ===
During the Persian Constitutional Revolution, Tabriz was at the center of battles which followed the ascent to the throne of Mohammad Ali Shah Qajar on 8 January 1907. The revolutionary forces were headed by Sattar Khan who was originally from Arasbaran. Haydar Khan Amo-oghli had significant contribution in the inception and progression of the revolution, and introducing leftist ideas into Iranian mainstream politics. During the following tumultuous years, Amir Arshad, the headman of Haji-Alilu tribe, had a major impact on the subsequent political developments in Iran in relation to the status of Iranian Kurds. He is credited with fending off communism from Iran.

=== Persian nationalism ===
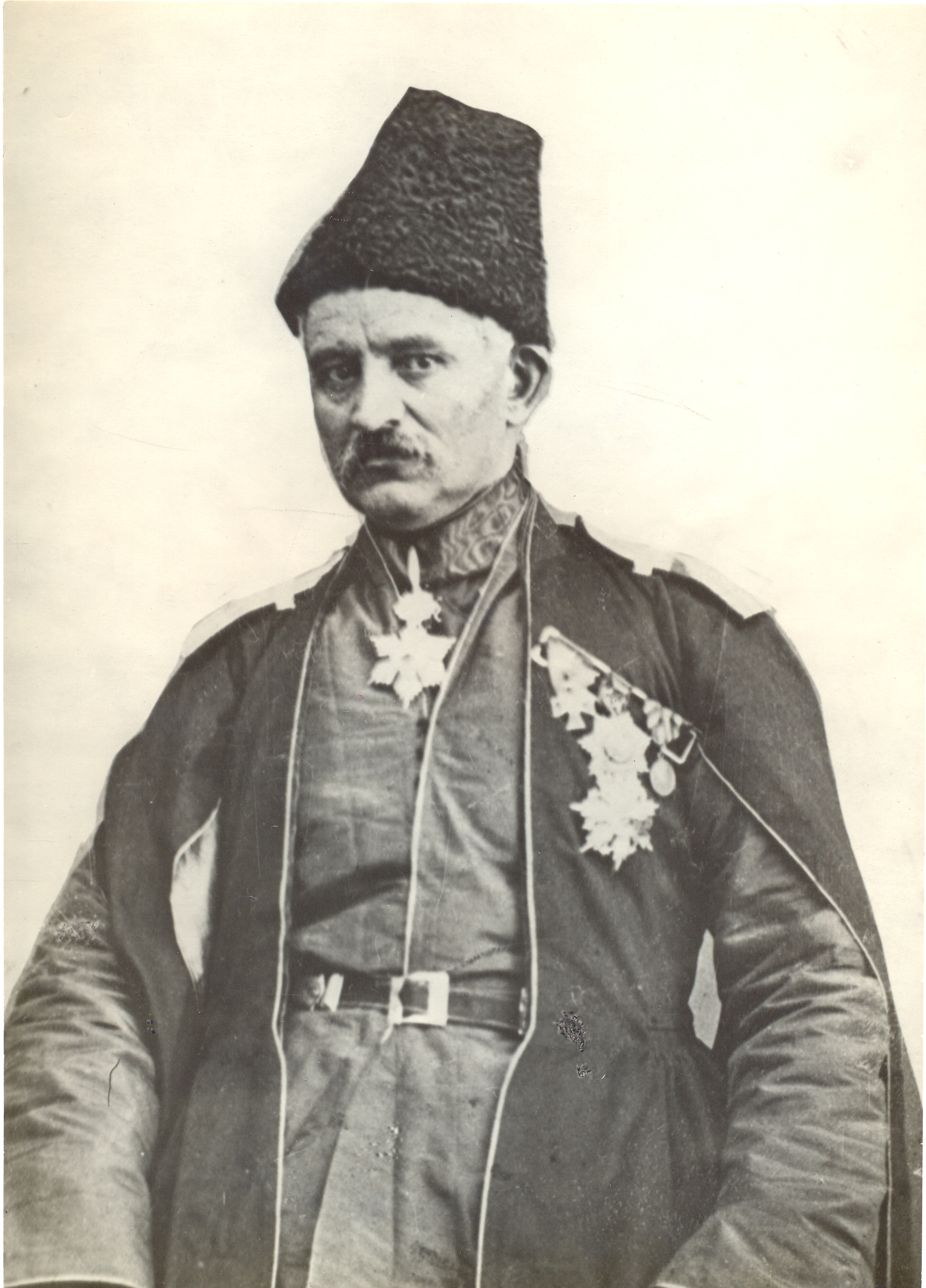
Mirza Fatali Akhundzade (also known as Akhundov), celebrated ethnic Azerbaijani author, playwright, philosopher, and founder of modern literary criticism. Born in Nukha to a family originally hailing from Iranian Azerbaijan.

The ill-fated Constitutional Revolution did not bring democracy to Iran. Instead, Rezā Shāh, then Brigadier-General of the Persian Cossack Brigade, deposed Ahmad Shah Qajar, the last Shah of the Qajar dynasty, and founded the Pahlavi dynasty in 1925 and established a despotic monarchy. His insistence on ethnic Persian nationalism and cultural unitarism along with forced detribalization and sedentarization resulted in suppression of several ethnic and social groups, including Azerbaijanis. Ironically, the main architect of this totalitarian policy, which was justified by reference to racial ultra-nationalism, was Mirza Fatali Akhundov, an intellectual from Azerbaijan. In accordance with the Orientalist views of the supremacy of the Aryan peoples, he idealized pre-Islamic Achaemenid and Sassanid empires, whilst negating the 'Islamization' of Persia by Muslim forces." This idealization of a distant past was put into practice by both the Pahlavi kings, particularly Mohammad Reza Pahlavi who honored himself with the title Āryāmehr, Light of the Aryans. Mohammad Reza Pahlavi in an interview concisely expressed his views by declaring, "we Iranians are Aryans, and the fact that we are not adjacent to other Aryan nations in Europe is just a geographical anomaly.".

Mirza Fatali Akhundov is not the only Azerbaijani intellectual in framing Iranian ultra-nationalism. Hassan Taqizadeh, the organizer of "Iran Society" in Berlin, has contributed to the development of Iranian nationalism. Since 1916 he published "Kaveh" periodical in Farsi language, which included articles emphasizing the racial unity of Germans and Iranians. Ahmad Kasravi, Taqi Arani, Hossein Kazemzadeh (Iranshahr) and Mahmoud Afshar advocated the suppression of the Azerbaijani language as they supposed that the multilingualism contradicted the racial purity of Iranians.

=== Pan-Turkism ===
The failure of the Democrats in the arena of Iranian politics after the Constitutional movement and the start of modern state-building paved the way for the emergence of the titular ethnic group's cultural nationalism. Whereas the adoption of integrationist policies preserved Iran's geographic integrity and provided the majority of Iranians with a secure and firm national identity, the blatant ignoring of other demands of the Constitutional movement, such as the call for the formation of a society based on law and order, left the country still searching for a political identity. The ultimate purpose was to persuade these populations to secede from the larger political entities to which they belonged and join the new pan-Turkic homeland. It was the latter appeal to Iranian Azerbaijanis, which, contrary to Pan-Turkist intentions, caused a small group of Azerbaijani intellectuals to become the strongest advocates of the territorial integrity of Iran.

After the constitutional revolution in Iran, a romantic nationalism was adopted by Azerbaijani Democrats as a reaction to the pan-Turkist irredentist policies threatening Iran's territorial integrity. It was during this period that Iranism and linguistic homogenization policies were proposed as a defensive nature against all others. Contrary to what one might expect, foremost among innovating this defensive nationalism were Iranian Azerbaijanis. They viewed that assuring the territorial integrity of the country was the first step in building a society based on law and a modern state. Through this framework, their political loyalty outweighed their ethnic and regional affiliations. The adoption of these integrationist policies paved the way for the emergence of the titular ethnic group's cultural nationalism.

=== World War II and Soviet intervention ===
In late 1941 Soviet forces invaded Iran in coordination with British Army under an operation known as Anglo-Soviet invasion of Iran. Their forces broke through the border and moved from the Azerbaijan SSR into Iranian Azerbaijan. Reza Shah was forced by the invading British to abdicate in favor of his son Mohammad Reza Pahlavi who replaced his father as Shah on the throne on 16 September 1941. At the aftermath of a four-year-long tumultuous period the Azerbaijan People's Government, a Soviet puppet state, was established in Tabriz, perhaps through direct involvement of the Soviet leadership. This government autonomously ruled the province from November 1945 to November 1946. However, the Soviet soon realized their idea was premature, the mass of the population did not support separatism; under largely Western pressure, the Soviet troops withdrew in 1946, which resulted in the quick collapse of the Azerbaijan People's Government.

=== Migration to Azerbaijan ===
Beginning in the 1850s, many Iranian Azerbaijanis opted to become work migrants and seek job opportunities in the Russian Empire, primarily in the economically booming Azerbaijani-populated part of the Caucasus. Due to them being Persian subjects, Russian offices often recorded them as "Persians". The migrants referred to one another as hamshahri ("compatriot") as an in-group identity. The word was adopted by the Azerbaijani-speaking locals as həmşəri and has since been applied by them to Iranian Azerbaijani migrants in general. Already in the nineteenth century, the word also spread to urban varieties of Russian of Baku and Tiflis in the form of gamshara (гамшара) or amshara (амшара), where it was, however, used with a negative connotation to mean "a raggamuffin". In the Soviet times, the word was borrowed into the Russian slang of Ashkhabad and was used to refer to forestallers.

Iranian Azerbaijanis often worked menial jobs, including on dyer's madder plantations in Guba where 9,000 out of 14,000 Iranian Azerbaijani contract workers were employed as of 1867. In the 1886 economic report on the life of the peasantry of the Guba district, Yagodynsky reported frequent cases of intermarriage between the Iranian work migrants and local women which prompted the former to settle in villages near Guba and quickly assimilate. Children from such families would be completely integrated in the community and not be regarded as foreigners or outsiders by its residents.

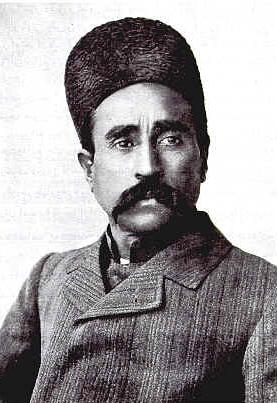
Sattar Khan, Iranian Azerbaijani, was a key figure in the Iranian Constitutional Revolution and is held in great esteem by many Iranians.

Starting from the late nineteenth century, Baku was another popular destination for Iranian Azerbaijanis, thanks to its highly developing oil industry. By the beginning of the twentieth century, they already constituted 50% of all the oil workers of Baku, and numbered 9,426 people in 1897, 11,132 people in 1903 and 25,096 people in 1913. Amo-oghli and Sattar Khan notably worked in the Baku oil fields before returning to Iran and engaging in politics.

In 1925, there were 45,028 Iranian-born Azerbaijanis in the Azerbaijan SSR. Of those, 15,000 (mostly oil workers, port and navy workers and railway workers) had retained Iranian citizenship by 1938 and were concentrated in Baku and Ganja. In accordance with the 1938 decision of the Central Committee of the Communist Party of the Soviet Union, residents of Azerbaijan with Iranian citizenship were given 10 days to apply for Soviet citizenship and were then relocated to Kazakhstan. Those who refused (numbering 2,878 people) became subject to deportation back to Iran immediately. Some naturalized Iranian Azerbaijanis were later accused of various anti-Soviet activities and arrested or even executed in the so-called "Iranian operation" of 1938.

After the fall of the Azerbaijan People's Government in 1946, as many as 10,000 Iranian Azerbaijani political émigrés relocated to Soviet Azerbaijan, fleeing the inevitable repressions of the Shah's government.

=== Islamic republic era and present-day ===
However, with the advent of the Iranian Revolution in 1979, the emphasis shifted away from nationalism as the new government highlighted religion as the main unifying factor. Within the Islamic Revolutionary government there emerged an Azerbaijani nationalist faction led by Ayatollah Kazem Shariatmadari, who advocated greater regional autonomy and wanted the constitution to be revised to include secularists and opposition parties; this was denied.

Azerbaijanis make up 25% of Tehran's population and 30.3% – 33% of the population of the Tehran Province. Azerbaijanis in Tehran live in all of the cities within Tehran Province. They are by far the largest ethnic group after Persians in Tehran and the wider Tehran Province.

In October 2020, several protests erupted in Iranian cities, including the capital Tehran and Tabriz, in support of Azerbaijan in its conflict with Armenia over the Nagorno-Karabakh region. Iranian Azerbaijani demonstrators chanted pro-Azerbaijan slogans and clashed with Iran's security forces.

== Politics and society ==
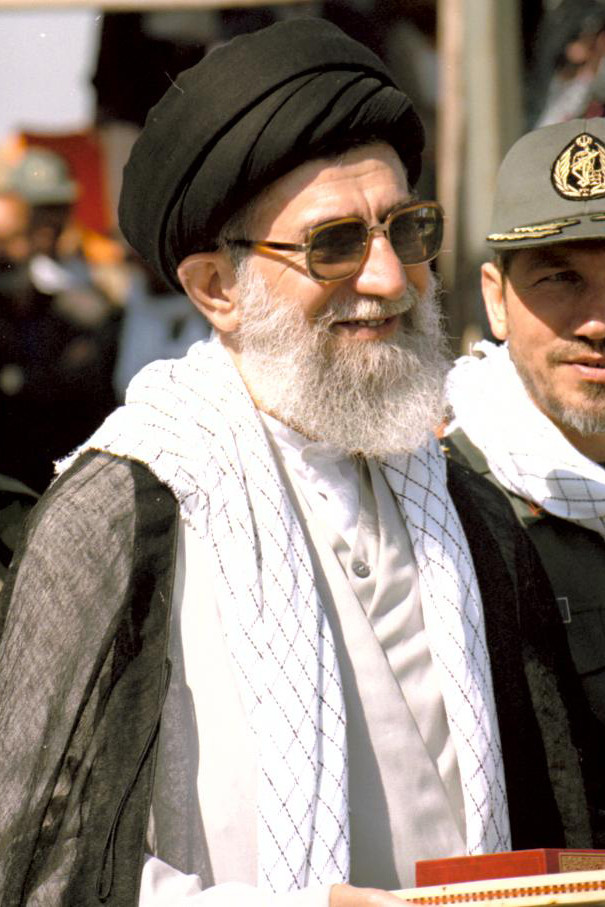
Iran's former supreme leader Ali Khamenei, as the highest-ranking official in Iran, was an Iranian Azerbaijani.

Generally, Iranian Azerbaijanis were regarded as "a well integrated linguistic minority" by academics prior to Iran's Islamic Revolution. Despite friction, they came to be well represented at all levels of, "political, military, and intellectual hierarchies, as well as the religious hierarchy.". In addition, the former Supreme Leader of Iran, Ali Khamenei, was half Azerbaijani. Many Iranians who opposed Azerbaijani secession from Iran very often cited how Khamenei was Azerbaijani, as to claim that ethnic discrimination did not exist in Iran and Azerbaijanis had no reason to secede. However, Azerbaijani activists claimed that Khamenei was one of the main oppressors of Azerbaijanis, and that he prioritized his position as the Supreme Leader of Iran over his Azerbaijani origins. Historically, Azerbaijanis did not vote based on ethnicity, and many Azerbaijani politicians in Iran were very disliked by Azerbaijanis. In contrast to the claims of de facto discrimination of some Iranian Azerbaijanis, the government claims that its policy in the past 30 years has been one of pan-Islamism, which is based on a common Islamic religion of which diverse ethnic groups may be part, and which does not favor or repress any particular ethnicity, including the Persian majority. Persian language is thus merely used as the lingua franca of the country, which helps maintain Iran's traditional centralized model of government. More recently, the Azerbaijani language and culture is being taught and studied at the university level in Iran, and there appears to exist publications of books, newspapers and apparently, regional radio broadcasts too in the language. Furthermore, Article 15 of Iran's constitution reads:

The use of regional and tribal languages in the press and mass media, as well as for teaching of their literature in schools, is allowed in addition to Persian.

According to Professor. Nikki R. Keddie of UCLA: "One can purchase newspapers, books, music tapes, and videos in Azerbaijani and Kurdish, and there are radio and television stations in ethnic areas that broadcast news and entertainment programs in even more languages".

Azerbaijani nationalism has oscillated since the Islamic revolution and recently escalated into riots over the publication in May 2006 of a cartoon that many Azerbaijanis found offensive. The cartoon was drawn by Mana Neyestani, an ethnic Azerbaijani, who was fired along with his editor as a result of the controversy.

Another series of protests took place in November 2015, in the cities of Iranian Azerbaijan including Tabriz, Urmia, Ardabil and Zanjan, in response to an episode of a popular children's program called Fitileh which had depicted what was seen as a racist image of Azerbaijanis. Mohammad Sarafraz director-general of the IRIB and Davud Nemati-Anarki, the head of the public relations department, officially apologised for the "unintentional offense" caused by the program. Protests were also held in July 2016 in Tehran, Tabriz, Urmia, Maragheh, Zanjan, Ahar, Khoy, and Ardabil in response to "denigration of Azerbaijanis by the state media". Plastic bullets were shot at protesters and several people were arrested.

Despite sporadic problems, Azerbaijanis are an intrinsic community within Iran. Currently, the living conditions of Iranian Azerbaijanis closely resemble that of Persians:

The life styles of urban Azeri do not differ from those of Persians, and there is considerable intermarriage among the upper classes in cities of mixed populations. Similarly, customs among Azeri villagers do not appear to differ markedly from those of Persian villagers.

Iranian Azerbaijanis are in high positions of authority, with the Azerbaijani Ayatollah Ali Khamenei formerly sitting as the Supreme Leader. Azerbaijanis in Iran remain quite conservative in comparison to most Azerbaijanis in the Republic of Azerbaijan. Nonetheless, since the Republic of Azerbaijan's independence in 1991, there has been renewed interest and contact between Azerbaijanis on both sides of the border. Andrew Burke writes:

Azeri are famously active in commerce and in bazaars all over Iran their voluble voices can be heard. Older Azeri men wear the traditional wool hat and their music and dances have become part of the mainstream culture. Azeris are well integrated and many Azeri Iranians are prominent in Persian literature, politics and clerical world.

According to Bulent Gokay:

The Northern part of Iran, that used to be called Azerbaijan, is inhabited by 17 million Azeris. This population has been traditionally well integrated with the multi-ethnic Iranian state.

Richard Thomas, Roger East, and Alan John Day state:

The 15–20 million Azeri Turks living in northern Iran, ethnically identical to Azeris, have embraced Shia Islam and are well integrated into Iranian society

According to Michael P. Croissant:

Although Iran's fifteen-million Azeri population is well integrated into Iranian society and has shown little desire to secede, Tehran has nonetheless shown extreme concern with prospects of the rise of sentiments calling for union between the two Azerbaijans.

While Iranian Azerbaijanis may seek greater linguistic rights, few of them display separatist tendencies. Extensive reporting by Afshin Molavi, an Iranian Azerbaijani scholar, in the three major Azerbaijani provinces of Iran, as well as among Iranian Azerbaijanis in Tehran, found that separatist sentiment was not widely held among Iranian Azerbaijanis. Few people framed their genuine political, social and economic frustration – feelings that are shared by the majority of Iranians – within an ethnic context.

According to another Iranian Azerbaijani scholar, Dr. Hassan Javadi – a Tabriz-born, Cambridge-educated scholar of Azerbaijani literature and professor of Persian, Azerbaijani and English literature at George Washington University – Iranian Azerbaijanis have more important matters on their mind than cultural rights. "Iran's Azerbaijani community, like the rest of the country, is engaged in the movement for reform and democracy," Javadi told the Central Asia Caucasus Institute crowd, adding that separatist groups represent "fringe thinking." He also told EurasiaNet: "I get no sense that these cultural issues outweigh national ones, nor do I have any sense that there is widespread talk of secession."

On 26 August 2016, 42 members of the Iranian parliament wrote a letter to President Hassan Rouhani requesting that Turkish Language and Literature be added to the curriculum of primary and secondary schools. Months after this request, on 30 October 2016, for the first time in Iranian history, Azerbaijani members of parliament came together regardless of party or political views and announced the establishment of the Fraction of Turkic regions. Masoud Pezeshkian was elected as the leader of the faction. In addition, a management group consisting of 25 members of parliament was formed. This parliamentary group, established by 100 members of parliament, announced that its goals were to obtain the right to education in Turkish and to increase investment in Azerbaijani regions. Following the intense reaction of the Iranian public and accusations of separatism, the faction dissolved itself on 10 August 2017. According to some analysts, with the support of Turkey, pan-Turkist ideas are spreading among Iranian Azerbaijanis, which is causing ethnic tensions in the Azerbaijan region of Iran.

Masoud Pezeshkian, a West Azerbaijani politician, was elected as the ninth president of Iran. During a speech, he said that he, his mother and father were Turks. He expressed his pride in this. However, in a speech he later gave, he recited a few lines from Mohammad-Hossein Shahriar's poem "Heydar Baba Salam" and was warned by an official who came from the side. Pezeshkian said to his assistant who came to him, "No problem. No problem reading two Turkic poems" and smiled. This situation later became a subject of controversy.

== Culture ==
Iranian Azerbaijanis were influenced by the Iranian culture. At the same time, they have influenced and been influenced by their non-Iranian neighbors, especially Caucasians and Russians. Azerbaijani music is distinct music that is tightly connected to the music of other Iranian peoples such as Persian music and Kurdish music, and also the music of the Caucasian peoples. Although the Azerbaijani language is not an official language of Iran it is widely used, mostly orally, among the Iranian Azerbaijanis. Most Iranian Azerbaijanis are bilingual in Azerbaijani and Persian, and exogamy and intermarriage with other populations, particularly Persian speakers, are common among Iranian Azeri families that originated in the historic Azerbaijan region. Azerbaijani-specific cultural aspects have somewhat diminished in prominence among the many Azeri families that have moved to large cities like Tehran during the past century. Iranian Azerbaijanis are traditionally sensitive to their ethnic identity, but are supportive of bilingualism in Azerbaijani and Persian as well.

=== Literature ===
Jahan Shah (r. 1438–67), the Qara Qoyunlu ("black sheep") ruler of Iran was a master poet. He compiled a diwan under the pen-name Haqiqi. Shah Ismail (1487–1524), who used the pen-name Khata'i, was a prominent ruler-poet and has, apart from his diwan compiled a mathnawi called Deh-name, consisting of some eulogies of Ali, the fourth Caliph of early Islam. After the Safavid era, Azerbaijani could not sustain its early development. The main theme of the seventeenth and eighteenth centuries was the development of verse-folk stories, mainly intended for performance by Ashughs in weddings. The most famous among these literary works are Koroghlu, Ashiq Qərib, and Kərəm ilə Əsli.

Following the establishing of Qajar dynasty in Iran Azerbaijani literature flourished and reached its peak by the end of the nineteenth century. By then, journalism had been launched in Azerbaijani language and social activism had become the main theme of literary works. The most influential writers of this era are Fathali Akhondzadeh and Mojez Shabestari.

Pahlavi era was the darkest period for Azerbaijani literature. The Azerbaijani language was banned in official spheres with the advent of Reza Shah's reign, including at schools. This prohibition was formally abolished after the Islamic revolution, though the Azerbaijanis haven't enjoyed much cultural freedom since then. Writers of Azerbaijan, such as Gholam-Hossein Saedi, Samad Behrangi and Reza Barahani, published their works in Persian. The only exception was Mohammad-Hossein Shahriar, who is famous for his verse book, Heydar Babaya Salam; simply he was too mighty to be censored. Shahriar's work was an innovative way of summarizing the Cultural identity in concise poetic form and was adapted by a generation of lesser-known poets, particularly from Qareh Dagh region, to record their oral traditions. One remarkable example is Abbas Eslami, known with his pen-name Barez, (1932–2011) who described the melancholic demise of his homeland in a book titled mourning Sabalan. Another example is Mohamad Golmohamadi's long poem, titled I am madly in love with Qareh Dagh (قاراداغ اؤلکه‌سینین گؤر نئجه دیوانه‌سی ام), is a concise description of the region's cultural landscape.

The long-lasting suppression finally led to a generation of revolutionary poets, composing verses by allegoric allusion to the imposing landscape of Azerbaijan:

Sahand, o mountain of pure snow,
Descended from Heaven with Zoroaster
Fire in your heart, snow on your shoulders,
with storm of centuries,
And white hair of history on your chest ...

Yadollah Maftun Amini (born in 1926)

After the Islamic revolution of 1979, however, great literary works have not yet appeared and glory days of fifteenth century ruler-poets is not on the horizon. The contemporary literature is restricted to oral traditions, such as bayaties.

==== Carpet weaving ====
Tabriz is one of the main centers of carpet weaving in Iran. At present 40% of Iranian carpet exports are originated from Tabriz. These carpets are generally known as Tabriz rugs. Another carpet weaving center is Ardebil, which, despite being overshadowed by Tabriz in recent years, has produced the finest carpets in past. The two most famous Iranian rugs in the world had been woven in Ardebil in 1540. One is hung in the Victoria and Albert Museum in London, and the other is in the Los Angeles County Museum of Art. These carpets have silk warps and contain over thirty million knots.

The acme of carpet weaving art is manifested in Verni, which was originated in Nagorno-Karabakh. Verni is a carpet-like kilim with a delicate and fine warp and woof, which is woven without a previous sketch, thanks to the creative talents of nomadic women and girls. Verni weavers employ the image of birds and animals (deer, rooster, cat, snake, birds, gazelle, sheep, camel, wolf and eagle) in simple geometrical shapes, imitating the earthenware patterns that were popular in prehistoric times. A key décor feature, which is intrinsic to many Vernis, is the S-element. Its shape varies, it may resemble both figure 5 and letter S. This element means "dragon" among the nomads. At present, Verni is woven by the girls of Arasbaran Tribes, often in the same room where the nomadic tribes reside, and is a significant income source for about 20,000 families in Qaradagh region.

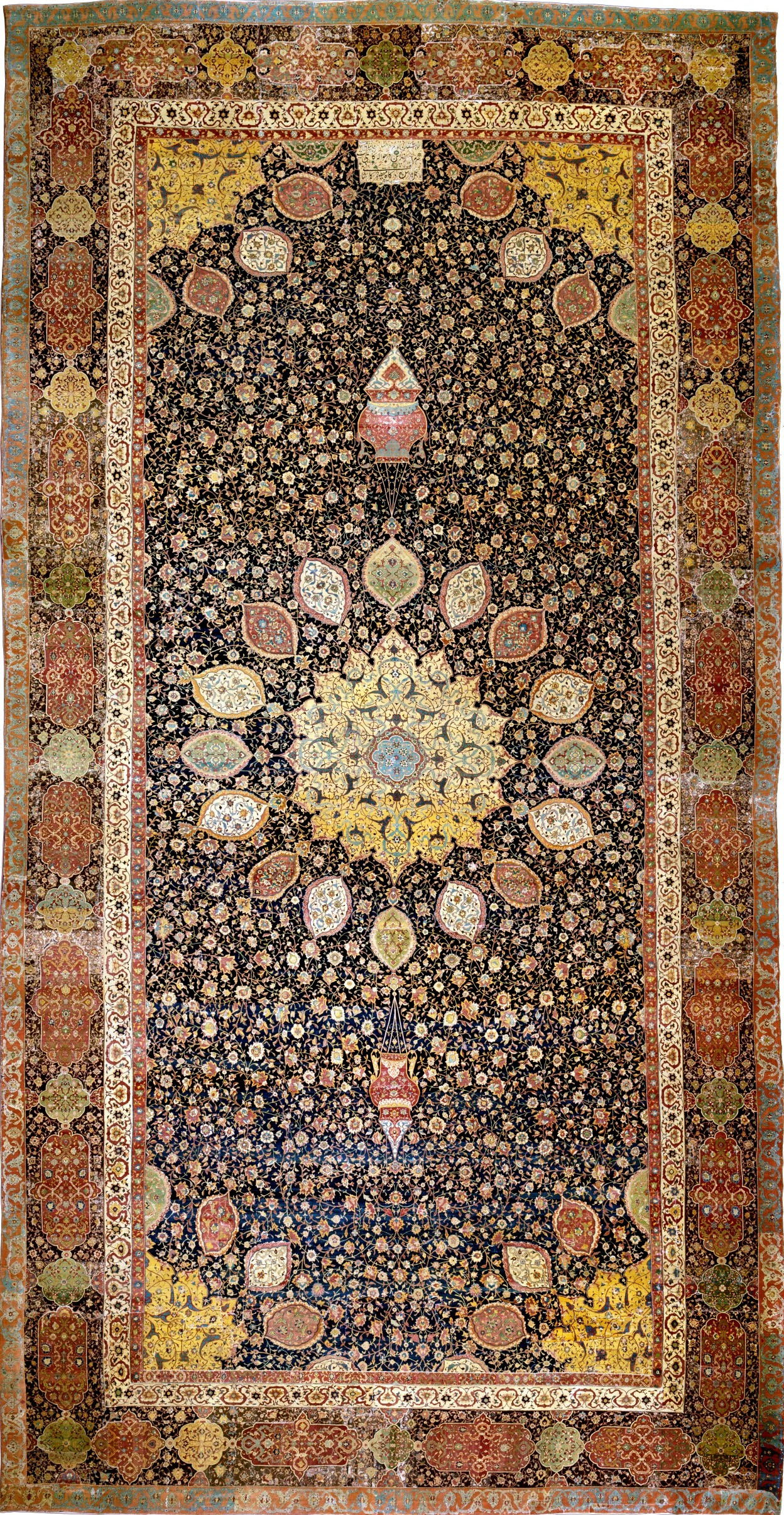
Ardebil carpet

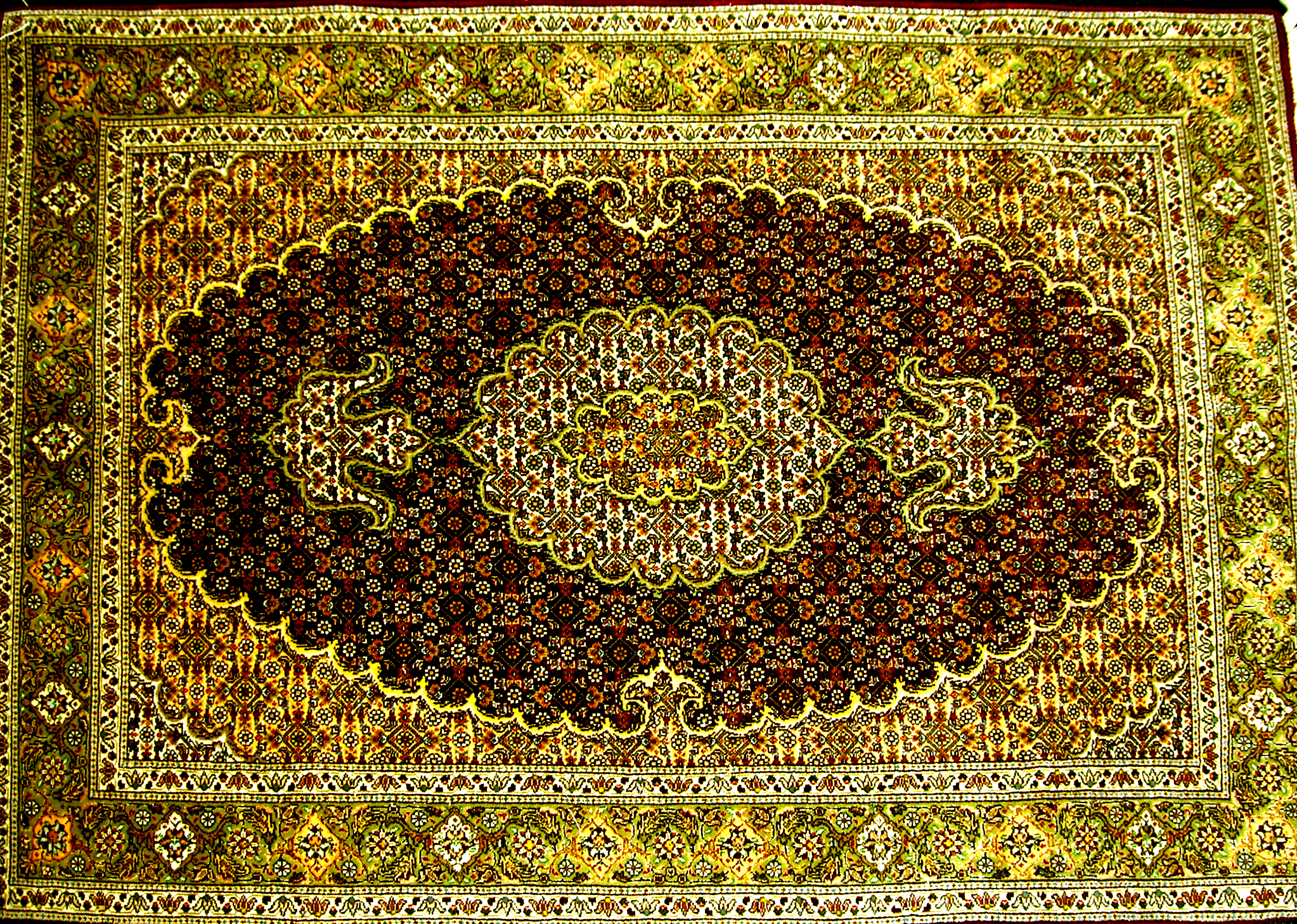
Tabriz carpet

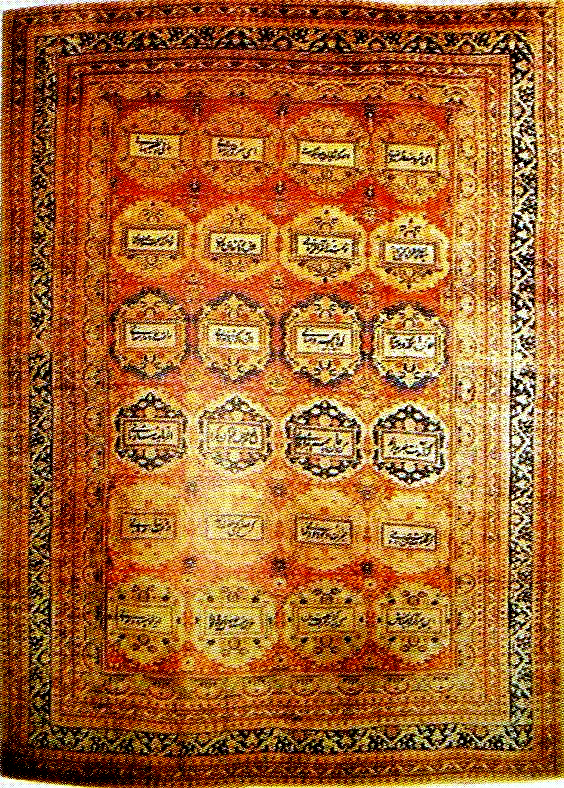
Haris carpet

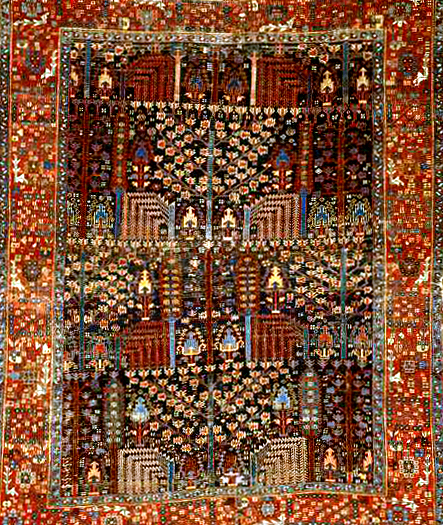
Qaradagh carpet

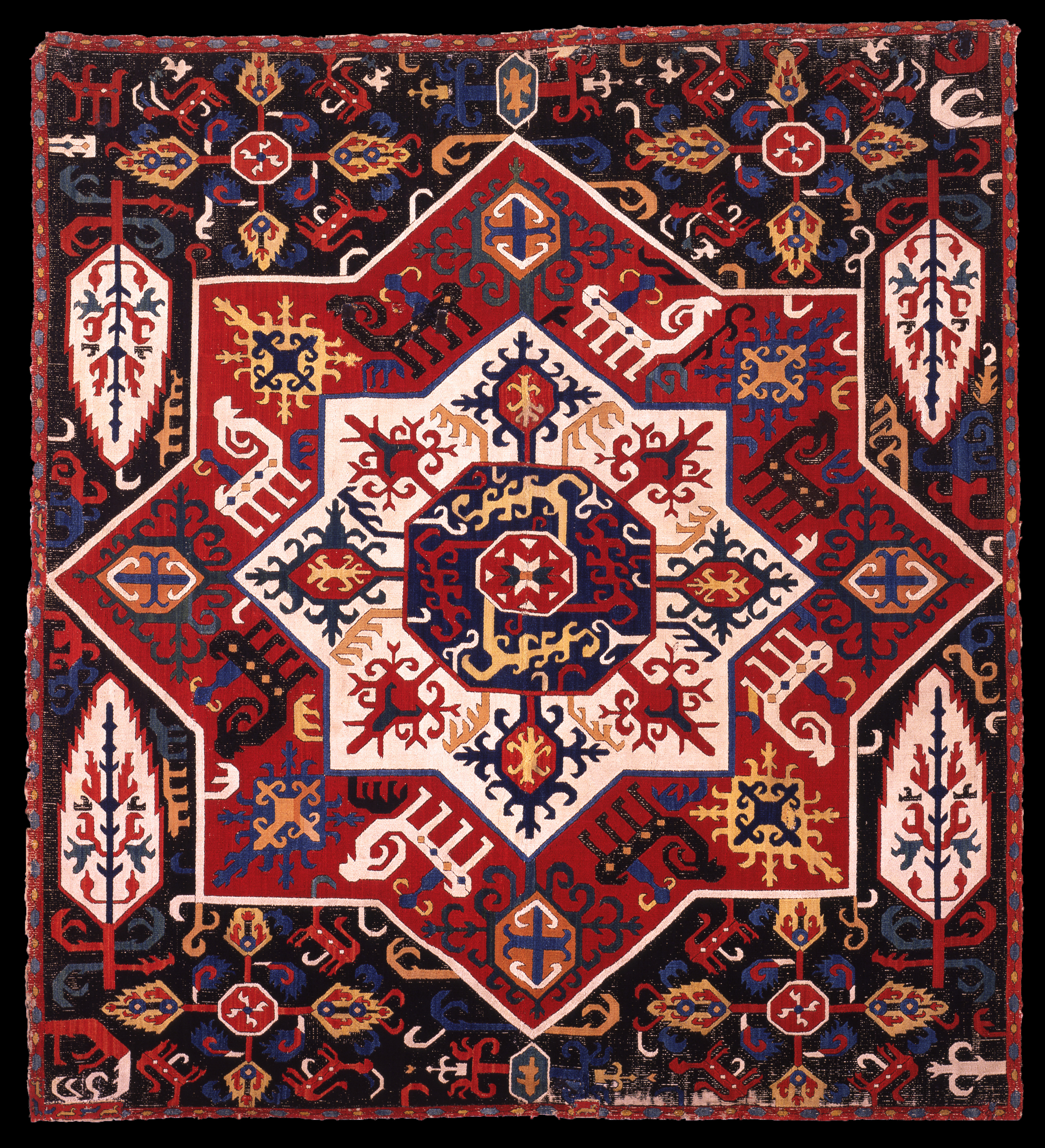
Vern.

=== Religion ===
The majority of Azerbaijanis are followers of Shia Islam. Azerbaijanis commemorate Shia holy days (ten first days of the holy month of Muharram) at least with the same intensity as other Iranians. In metropolitan cities with mixed ethnic composition, such as Tehran, Azerbaijanis are thought to be more intense in their expression of religious ritual than their Persian counterparts. There is also a small minority of Azerbaijanis who practice the Baháʼí Faith. Also in recent years, some Azerbaijanis in Iran have begun converting to Christianity, which is strictly prohibited and can result in imprisonment.

== See also ==
- Peoples of the Caucasus
