= Ali Mojuz =

Iranian poet

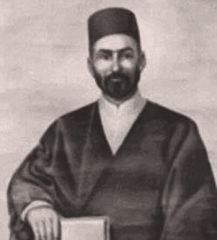
- Born: 29 March 1873; Shabestar, Iran
- Died: 25 September 1934 (aged 61); Shahrud, Iran
- Occupation: Poet

Ali Mojuz or Mirza Ali Mojuz Shabestarti (Persian: معجز شبستری, Azerbaijani: Mirzə Əli Möcüz, میرزا علی معجز) was an Iranian Azerbaijani poet. He chose to write in Azeri Turkish instead of Persian, Iran's dominant language.

He was born on March 29, 1873, in Shabestar, to a merchant family. Mojuz left his birthplace at age 16 after his father's death. He joined his brothers in Istanbul who ran a stationery business. He later studied at a school of theology. In 1889, he moved to Turkey, where he published his first poems. Mojuz returned to his homeland in 1905.

Under the influence of Azeri democratic literature, especially Mirza Alakbar Sabir, he wrote satirical poetry. His main themes were the "disempowerment of the people" ("Motherland", "Every Day", etc.), his "struggle against the oppressors" and the "position of enslaved women" ("Unhappy Girl", etc.) Mojuz also praised Vladimir Lenin ("Lenin"), and was interested in the October Revolution of 1917 ("Revolution breaks out", "Finally", etc.).

After the collapse of the government of Azerbaijan, Mohammad Reza Shah's reign over Iran (1941–79) included a very strict ban on the publication of Azeri works. Mojuz turned to writing for recitation to illiterate, rural Azeris.

His poetry was first published in 1945. A selection of his works entitled Mirzə Əli Möcüz: Seçilmiş Əsərləri (Mirza Ali Mo’juz Selected Works) in Tabriz. Two thousand copies sold out in “ten to fifteen days."

== Works ==
- Poetry, Baku, 1955
- In Russian. per. - Poems. [Pre. G. Mammadali], B., 1956, Proc.: An Anthology of Azerbaijani poetry, v. 2, Moscow, 1960, p. 244-58

== Sources ==
- Akhundzadeh. Alifba-ye Jadid va Maktubat. pp. 249–251.

== Links ==
- Ali Mojuz in Great Soviet Encyclopedia
- Omarova LA, Ali Mojuz Shabestarti, "Math. Azerb. SSR ", 1955, № 5
- Omarova L., Ali Mojuz Shabestarti, Baku, 1958.
