= Karadaghis =

Qaradaghis
Total population
- 75,000 - 80,000

Regions with significant populations
- Iran, Azerbaijan

Languages
- Azerbaijani

Religion
- Shia Islam

Related ethnic groups
- Other Azerbaijanis, especially Iranian Azerbaijanis

Qaradaghis or Karadaghis, (Azerbaijani: Qaradağlılar) are a Turkic sub-ethnic group of Azerbaijanis, mainly living in Southern Aras river called Qaradagh in Eastern Azerbaijan, Iran. The Qaradaghis are predominantly Shi'a Muslim and speak the Qaradaghi dialect of the Azerbaijani language.

== See also ==
- Karadagh khanate
- Tribes of Karadagh
