= Azerbaijanis =

Turkic ethnic group

Azərbaycanlılar آذربایجانلیلار
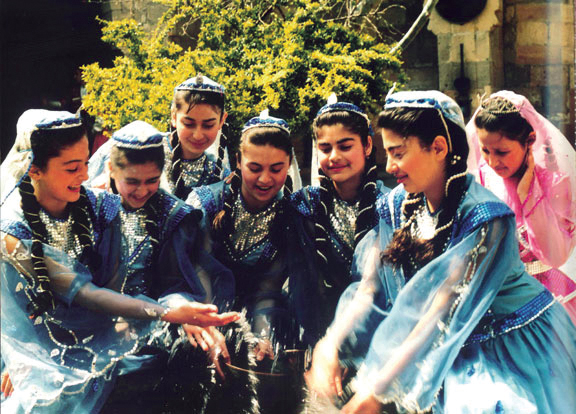
- Azerbaijani girls in traditional dresses, 1997

Total population
- 30–35 million (2002)

Regions with significant populations
- Iran: 12–23 million
- Azerbaijan: 8,172,800
- Russia: 603,070
- Turkey: 530,000–2 million
- Georgia: 233,178
- Kazakhstan: 155,364
- Ukraine: 45,176
- Uzbekistan: 44,400
- Turkmenistan: 33,365
- United States: 24,377
- Germany: 20,000–30,000
- Netherlands: 18,000
- Kyrgyzstan: 17,823
- France: 70,000
- Canada: 9,915
- Portugal: 8,000
- United Arab Emirates: 7,000
- United Kingdom: 6,220
- Belarus: 5,567
- Sweden: 2,935
- Latvia: 1,567–2,032
- Australia: 1,036
- Austria: 1,000
- Estonia: 940
- Norway: 806
- Lithuania: 648
- South Korea: 608
- Italy: 552

Languages
- Azerbaijani (native); Persian, Turkish

Religion
- Predominantly Shia Islam, minority Sunni Islam

Related ethnic groups
- Turkish people, Turkmen people, and Iranian peoples

Azerbaijanis (/ˌæzərbaɪˈdʒæni, -ɑːni/; Azerbaijani: Azərbaycanlılar, آذربایجانلیلار), Azeris, or Azerbaijani Turks (Azərbaycan türkləri, آذربایجان تۆرکلری) are a Turkic ethnic group living mainly in the Azerbaijan region of northwestern Iran and the Republic of Azerbaijan. They are the largest ethnic group in the Republic of Azerbaijan and the second-largest ethnic group in neighboring Iran and Georgia. They speak the Azerbaijani language, belonging to the Oghuz branch of the Turkic languages, and predominantly practice Shia Islam.

Following the Russo-Persian Wars of 1813 and 1828, the territories of Qajar Iran in the Caucasus were ceded to the Russian Empire and the treaties of Gulistan in 1813 and Turkmenchay in 1828 finalized the borders between Russia and Iran. After more than 80 years of being under the Russian Empire in the Caucasus, the Azerbaijan Democratic Republic was established in 1918 which defined the territory of the Republic of Azerbaijan.

== Etymology ==
Azerbaijan is believed to be named after Atropates, a Persian satrap (governor) who ruled in Atropatene (modern Iranian Azerbaijan) circa 321 BC. The name Atropates is the Hellenistic form of Old Persian Aturpat which means 'guardian of fire' itself a compound of ātūr 'fire' (later āður (آذر) in (early) New Persian, and is pronounced āzar today) + -pat suffix for -guardian, -lord, -master (-pat in early Middle Persian, -bod (بُد) in New Persian).

Present-day name Azerbaijan is the Arabicized form of Āzarpāyegān (Persian: آذرپایگان) meaning 'the guardians of fire' later becoming Azerbaijan (Persian: آذربایجان) due to the phonemic shift from /p/ to /b/ and /g/ to /dʒ/ which is a result of the medieval Arabic influences that followed the Arab invasion of Iran, and is due to the lack of the phoneme /p/ and /g/ in the Arabic language. The word Azarpāyegān itself is ultimately from Old Persian Āturpātakān (Persian: آتورپاتکان) meaning 'the land associated with (satrap) Aturpat' or 'the land of fire guardians' (-an, in its postvocalic form -kān, is a suffix for association or forming adverbs and plurals; e.g.: Gilan 'land associated with Gil people').

=== Ethnonym ===
The modern ethnonym "Azerbaijani" or "Azeri" refers to the Turkic peoples of Iran's northwestern historic region of Azerbaijan (also known as Iranian Azerbaijan) and the Republic of Azerbaijan. They historically called themselves or were referred to by others as Muslims and/or Turks. They were also referred to as Ajam (meaning from Iran), using the term incorrectly to denote their Shia belief rather than ethnic identity. When the Southern Caucasus became part of the Russian Empire in the nineteenth century, the Russian authorities, who traditionally referred to all Turkic people as Tatars, defined Tatars living in the Transcaucasus region as Caucasian Tatars or more rarely Aderbeijanskie (Адербейджанские) Tatars or even Persian Tatars in order to distinguish them from other Turkic groups and the Persian speakers of Iran. The Russian Brockhaus and Efron Encyclopedic Dictionary, written in the 1890s, also referred to Tatars in Azerbaijan as Aderbeijans (адербейджаны), but noted that the term had not been widely adopted. This ethnonym was also used by Joseph Deniker in 1900. In Azerbaijani language publications, the expression "Azerbaijani nation" referring to those who were known as Tatars of the Caucasus first appeared in the newspaper Kashkul in 1880.

During the early Soviet period, the term "Transcaucasian Tatars" was supplanted by "Azerbaijani Turks" and ultimately "Azerbaijanis." For some time afterwards, the term "Azerbaijanis" was then applied to all Turkic-speaking Muslims in Transcaucasia, from the Meskhetian Turks in southwestern Georgia, to the Terekemes of southern Dagestan, as well as assimilated Tats and Talysh. The temporary designation of Meskhetian Turks as "Azerbaijanis" was most likely related to the existing administrative framework of the Transcaucasian SFSR, as the Azerbaijan SSR was one of its founding members. After the establishment of the Azerbaijan SSR, on the order of Soviet leader Stalin, the "name of the formal language" of the Azerbaijan SSR was also "changed from Turkic to Azerbaijani".

Among post-Soviet Azerbaijanis, the term "Azeri" usually provokes a negative reaction.

=== Exonym ===
The Chechen and Ingush names for Azerbaijanis (Note: The ethnonyms are also used to designate Persians.) are Ghezloy/Ghoazloy (ГӀезлой/ГӀоазлой) and Ghazaroy/Ghazharey (ГӀажарой/ГӀажарей). The former goes back to the name of Qizilbash while the latter goes back to the name of Qajars, having presumably emerged in Chechen and Ingush languages during the reign of Qajars in Iran in the 18th–19th centuries.

== History ==
Ancient residents of the area, known as Azaris, spoke Old Azeri from the Iranian branch of the Indo-European languages. In the 11th century AD with Seljuq conquests, Oghuz Turkic tribes started moving across the Iranian Plateau into the Caucasus and Anatolia. The influx of the Oghuz and other Turkmen tribes was further accentuated by the Mongol invasion. These Turkmen tribes spread as smaller groups, a number of which settled down in the Caucasus and Iran, resulting in the Turkification of the local population. Over time they converted to Shia Islam and gradually absorbed Azerbaijan and Shirvan.

=== Ancient period ===
Caucasian-speaking Albanian tribes are believed to be the earliest inhabitants of the region in the north of Aras river, where the Republic of Azerbaijan is located. The region also saw Scythian settlement in the ninth century BC, following which the Medes came to dominate the area to the south of the Aras River.

Alexander the Great defeated the Achaemenids in 330 BC, but allowed the Median satrap Atropates to remain in power. Following the decline of the Seleucids in Persia in 247 BC, an Armenian Kingdom exercised control over parts of Caucasian Albania. Caucasian Albanians established a kingdom in the first century BC and largely remained independent until the Persian Sassanids made their kingdom a vassal state in 252 AD. Caucasian Albania's ruler, King Urnayr, went to Armenia and then officially adopted Christianity as the state religion in the fourth century AD, and Albania remained a Christian state until the 8th century.

=== Medieval period ===
Sassanid control ended with their defeat by the Rashidun Caliphate in 642 AD through the Muslim conquest of Persia. The Arabs made Caucasian Albania a vassal state after the Christian resistance, led by Prince Javanshir, surrendered in 667. Between the ninth and tenth centuries, Arab authors began to refer to the region between the Kura and Aras rivers as Arran. During this time, Arabs from Basra and Kufa came to Azerbaijan and seized lands that indigenous peoples had abandoned; the Arabs became a land-owning elite. Conversion to Islam was slow as local resistance persisted for centuries and resentment grew as small groups of Arabs began migrating to cities such as Tabriz and Maraghah. This influx sparked a major rebellion in Iranian Azerbaijan from 816 to 837, led by an Iranian Zoroastrian commoner named Babak Khorramdin. However, despite pockets of continued resistance, the majority of the inhabitants of Azerbaijan converted to Islam. Later, in the 10th and 11th centuries, parts of Azerbaijan were ruled by the Kurdish dynasty of Shaddadid and Arab Radawids.

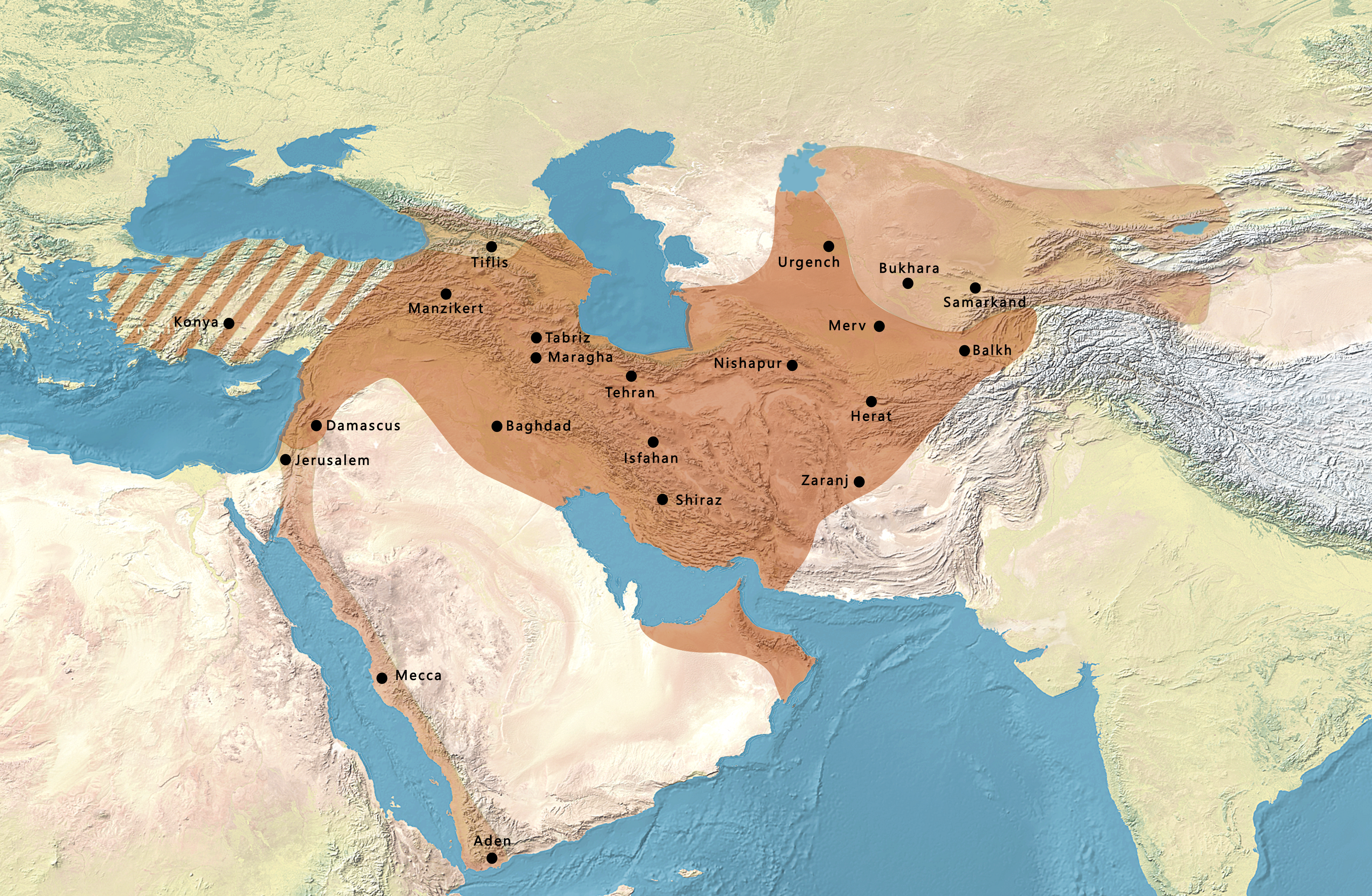
Territorial extent of the Seljuk Empire in 1090, stretching from Karakum Desert to modern-day Azerbaijan

In the middle of the eleventh century, the Seljuq dynasty overthrew Arab rule and established an empire that encompassed most of Southwest Asia. The Seljuk period marked the influx of Oghuz nomads into the region. The emerging dominance of the Turkic language was chronicled in epic poems or dastans, the oldest being the Book of Dede Korkut, which relate allegorical tales about the early Turks in the Caucasus and Asia Minor. Turkic dominion was interrupted by the Mongols in 1227, but it returned with the Timurids and then Sunni Qara Qoyunlū (Black Sheep Turkmen) and Aq Qoyunlū (White Sheep Turkmen), who dominated Azerbaijan, large parts of Iran, eastern Anatolia, and other minor parts of West Asia, until the Shi'a Safavids took power in 1501.

=== Early modern period ===
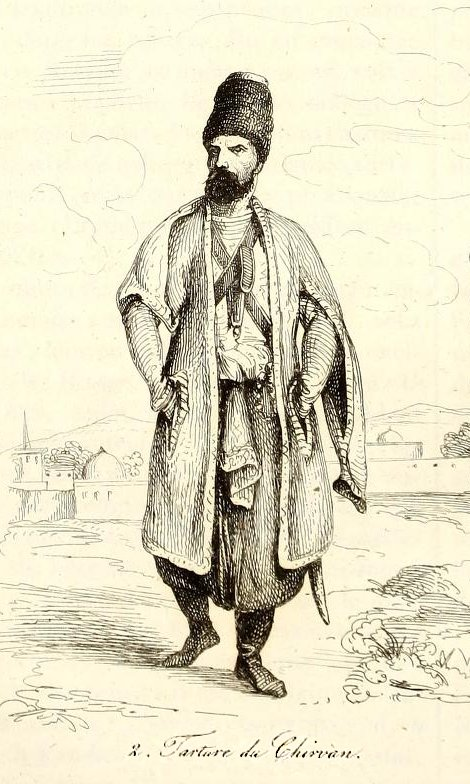
Shirvan Tatar (i.e. Azerbaijani). Engraving from book of Jean Baptiste Benoît Eyriès. Voyage pittoresque en Asie et en Afrique: résumé général des voyages anciens et modernes... T. I, 1839

The Safavids, who rose from around Ardabil in Iranian Azerbaijan and lasted until 1722, established the foundations of the modern Iranian state. The Safavids, alongside their Ottoman archrivals, dominated the entire West Asian region and beyond for centuries. At its peak under Shah Abbas the Great, it rivaled its political and ideological archrival the Ottoman Empire in military strength. Noted for achievements in state-building, architecture, and the sciences, the Safavid state crumbled due to internal decay (mostly royal intrigues), ethnic minority uprisings and external pressures from the Russians, and the eventually opportunistic Afghans, who would mark the end of the dynasty. The Safavids encouraged and spread Shi'a Islam, as well as the arts and culture, and Shah Abbas the Great created an intellectual atmosphere that according to some scholars was a new "golden age". He reformed the government and the military and responded to the needs of the common people.

After the Safavid state disintegrated, it was followed by the conquest by Nader Shah Afshar, a Shia chieftain from Khorasan who reduced the power of the ghulat Shi'a and empowered a moderate form of Shi'ism, and, exceptionally noted for his military genius, making Iran reach its greatest extent since the Sassanid Empire. The brief reign of Karim Khan came next, followed by the Qajars, who ruled what is the present-day Azerbaijan Republic and Iran from 1779. Russia loomed as a threat to Persian and Turkish holdings in the Caucasus in this period. The Russo-Persian Wars, despite already having had minor military conflicts in the 17th century, officially began in the eighteenth century and ended in the early nineteenth century with the Treaty of Gulistan of 1813 and the Treaty of Turkmenchay in 1828, which ceded the Caucasian portion of Qajar Iran to the Russian Empire. While Azerbaijanis in Iran integrated into Iranian society, Azerbaijanis who used to live in Aran, were incorporated into the Russian Empire.

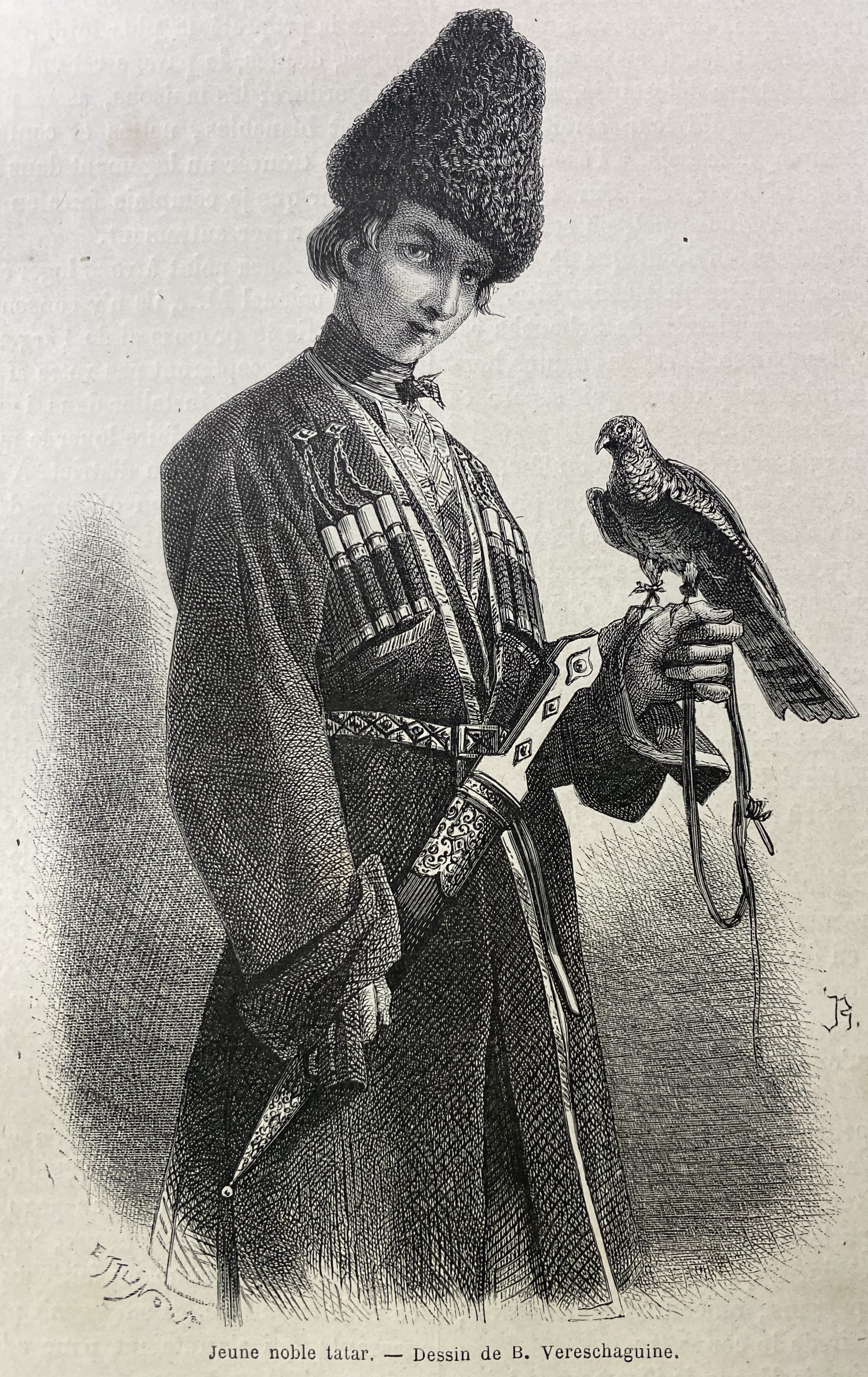
"Young noble Tatar," by Vasily Vereshchagin. Shusha, 1865

Despite the Russian conquest, throughout the entire 19th century, preoccupation with Iranian culture, literature, and language remained widespread amongst Shia and Sunni intellectuals in the Russian-held cities of Baku, Ganja and Tiflis (Tbilisi, now Georgia). Within the same century, in post-Iranian Russian-held East Caucasia, an Azerbaijani national identity emerged at the end of the 19th century. In 1891, the idea of recognizing oneself as an "Azerbaijani Turk" was first popularized amongst the Caucasus Tatars in the periodical Kashkül. The articles printed in Kaspiy and Kashkül in 1891 are typically credited as being the earliest expressions of a cultural Azerbaijani identity.

Modernisation—compared to the neighboring Armenians and Georgians—was slow to develop amongst the Tatars of the Russian Caucasus. According to the 1897 Russian Empire census, less than five percent of the Tatars were able to read or write. The intellectual and newspaper editor Ali bey Huseynzade (1864–1940) led a campaign to 'Turkify, Islamise, modernise' the Caucasian Tatars, whereas Mammed Said Ordubadi (1872–1950), another journalist and activist, criticized superstition amongst Muslims.

=== Modern period in Republic of Azerbaijan ===
Map of Azerbaijan Democratic Republic presented by the Azerbaijani delegation Paris Peace Conference in 1919.

First flag of the Azerbaijan Democratic Republic (until 9 November 1918)

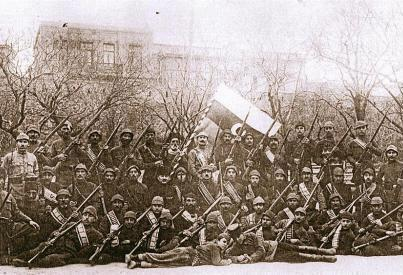
Soldiers and officers of the army of Azerbaijan Democratic Republic in 1918

After the collapse of the Russian Empire during World War I, the short-lived Transcaucasian Democratic Federative Republic was declared, constituting what are the present-day republics of Azerbaijan, Georgia, and Armenia. This was followed by March Days massacres that took place between 30 March and 2 April 1918 in the city of Baku and adjacent areas of the Baku Governorate of the Russian Empire. When the republic dissolved in May 1918, the leading Musavat party adopted the name "Azerbaijan" for the newly established Azerbaijan Democratic Republic, which was proclaimed on 27 May 1918, for political reasons, even though the name of "Azerbaijan" had been used to refer to the adjacent region of contemporary northwestern Iran. The ADR was the first modern parliamentary republic in the Turkic world and Muslim world. Among the important accomplishments of the Parliament was the extension of suffrage to women, making Azerbaijan the first Muslim nation to grant women equal political rights with men. Another important accomplishment of ADR was the establishment of Baku State University, which was the first modern-type university founded in Muslim East.

By March 1920, it was obvious that Soviet Russia would attack the much-needed Baku. Vladimir Lenin said that the invasion was justified as Soviet Russia could not survive without Baku's oil. Independent Azerbaijan lasted only 23 months until the Bolshevik 11th Soviet Red Army invaded it, establishing the Azerbaijan SSR on 28 April 1920. Although the bulk of the newly formed Azerbaijani army was engaged in putting down an Armenian revolt that had just broken out in Karabakh, Azeris did not surrender their brief independence of 1918–20 quickly or easily. As many as 20,000 Azerbaijani soldiers died resisting what was effectively a Russian reconquest.

The brief independence gained by the short-lived Azerbaijan Democratic Republic in 1918–1920 was followed by over 70 years of Soviet rule. Nevertheless, it was in the early Soviet period that the Azerbaijani national identity was forged. After the restoration of independence in October 1991, the Republic of Azerbaijan became embroiled in a war with neighboring Armenia over the Nagorno-Karabakh region.

The First Nagorno-Karabakh War resulted in the displacement of approximately 725,000 Azerbaijanis and 300,000–500,000 Armenians from both Azerbaijan and Armenia. As a result of the 2020 Nagorno-Karabakh war, Azerbaijan took control of 5 cities, 4 towns, 286 villages in the region. According to the 2020 Nagorno-Karabakh ceasefire agreement, internally displaced persons and refugees shall return to the territory of Nagorno-Karabakh and adjacent areas under the supervision of the United Nations High Commissioner for Refugees.

=== Modern period in Iran ===
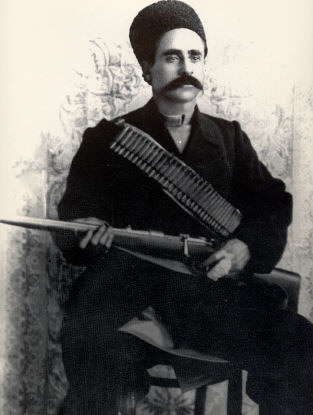
Sattar Khan (1868–1914) was a major revolutionary figure in the late Qajar period in Iran.

In Iran, Azerbaijanis such as Sattar Khan sought constitutional reform. The Persian Constitutional Revolution of 1906–11 shook the Qajar dynasty. A parliament (Majlis) was founded on the efforts of the constitutionalists, and pro-democracy newspapers appeared. The last Shah of the Qajar dynasty was soon removed in a military coup led by Reza Khan. In the quest to impose national homogeneity on a country where half of the population were ethnic minorities, Reza Shah banned in quick succession the use of the Azerbaijani language in schools, theatrical performances, religious ceremonies, and books.

Upon the dethronement of Reza Shah in September 1941, Soviet forces took control of Iranian Azerbaijan and helped to set up the Azerbaijan People's Government, a client state under the leadership of Sayyid Jafar Pishevari backed by Soviet Azerbaijan. The Soviet military presence in Iranian Azerbaijan was mainly aimed at securing the Allied supply route during World War II. Concerned with the continued Soviet presence after World War II, the United States and Britain pressured the Soviets to withdraw by late 1946. Immediately thereafter, the Iranian government regained control of Iranian Azerbaijan. According to Professor Gary R. Hess, local Azerbaijanis favored the Iranian rule, while the Soviets forewent the Iranian Azerbaijan due to the exaggerated sentiment for autonomy and oil being their top priority.

== Origins ==
In many references, Azerbaijanis are designated as a Turkic people, while some sources describe the origin of Azerbaijanis as "unclear", mainly Caucasian, mainly Iranian, mixed Caucasian Albanian and Turkish, and mixed with Caucasian, Iranian, and Turkic elements. Russian historian and orientalist Vladimir Minorsky writes that largely Iranian and Caucasian populations became Turkic-speaking following the Oghuz occupation of the region, though the characteristic features of the local Turkic language, such as Persian intonations and disregard of the vocalic harmony, were a remnant of the non-Turkic population.

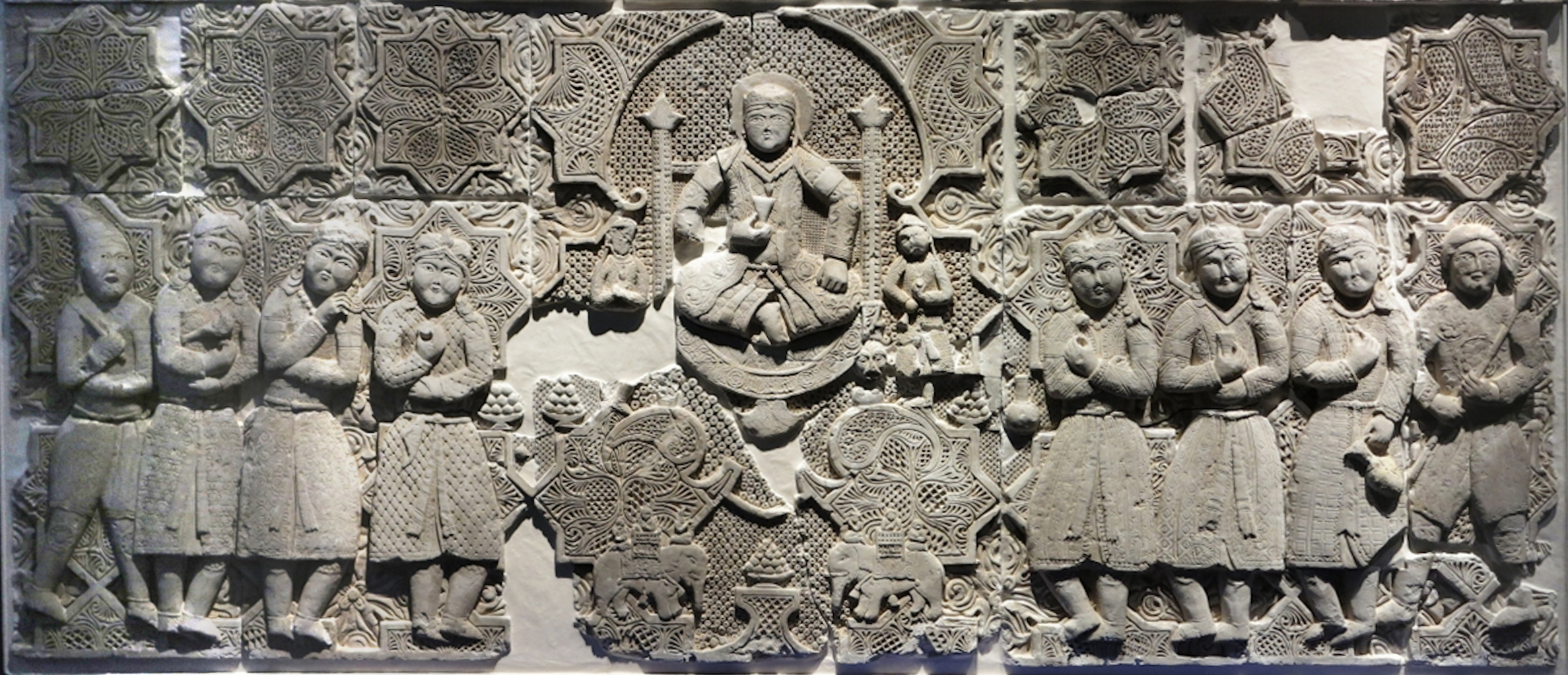
Toghrul III (center), last ruler of the Seljuks, an empire founded by Oghuz Turks of the Seljuk Oghuz clan

Historical research suggests that the Old Azeri language, belonging to the Northwestern branch of the Iranian languages and believed to have descended from the language of the Medes, gradually gained currency and was widely spoken in said region for many centuries.

Some Azerbaijanis of the Republic of Azerbaijan are believed to be descended from the inhabitants of Caucasian Albania, an ancient country located in the eastern Caucasus region, and various Iranian peoples which settled the region. They claim there is evidence that, due to repeated invasions and migrations, the aboriginal Caucasian population may have gradually been culturally and linguistically assimilated, first by Iranian peoples, such as the Persians, and later by the Oghuz Turks. Considerable information has been learned about the Caucasian Albanians, including their language, history, early conversion to Christianity, and relations with the Armenians and Georgians, under whose strong religious and cultural influence the Caucasian Albanians came in the coming centuries.

=== Turkic origin and Turkification ===
Turkification of the non-Turkic population derives from the Turkic settlements in the area now known as Azerbaijan, which began and accelerated during the Seljuk period. The migration of Oghuz Turks from present-day Turkmenistan, which is attested by linguistic similarity, remained high through the Mongol period, as many troops under the Ilkhanids were Turkic. By the Safavid period, the Turkic nature of Azerbaijan increased with the influence of the Qizilbash, an association of the Turkoman nomadic tribes that was the backbone of the Safavid Empire.

According to Soviet scholars, the Turkicization of Azerbaijan was largely completed during the Ilkhanid period. Faruk Sümer posits three periods in which Turkicization took place: Seljuk, Mongol and Post-Mongol (Qara Qoyunlu, Aq Qoyunlu and Safavid). In the first two, Oghuz Turkic tribes advanced or were driven to Anatolia and Arran. In the last period, the Turkic elements in Iran (Oghuz, with lesser admixtures of Uyghur, Qipchaq, Qarluq as well as Turkicized Mongols) were joined now by Anatolian Turks migrating back to Iran. This marked the final stage of Turkicization.

=== Iranian origin ===
10th-century Arab historian Al-Masudi attested the Old Azeri language and described that the region of Azerbaijan was inhabited by Persians. Archaeological evidence indicates that the Iranian religion of Zoroastrianism was prominent throughout the Caucasus before Christianity and Islam. According to Encyclopaedia Iranica, Azerbaijanis mainly originate from the earlier Iranian speakers, who still exist to this day in smaller numbers, and a massive migration of Oghuz Turks in the 11th and 12th centuries gradually Turkified Azerbaijan as well as Anatolia.

=== Caucasian origin ===
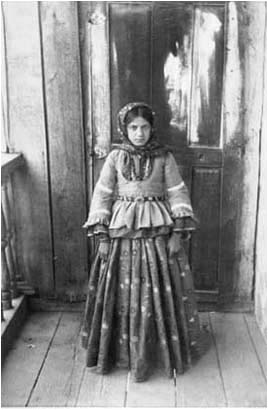
Azerbaijani girl from Shusha in silk national garments

According to Encyclopædia Britannica, the Azerbaijanis are of mixed descent, originating in the indigenous population of eastern Transcaucasia and possibly the Medians from northern Iran. There is evidence that, due to repeated invasions and migrations, aboriginal Caucasians may have been culturally assimilated, first by Ancient Iranian peoples and later by the Oghuz. Considerable information has been learned about the Caucasian Albanians including their language, history, early conversion to Christianity. The Udi language, still spoken in Azerbaijan, may be a remnant of the Albanians' language.

=== Genetics ===
Contemporary Western Asian genomes, a region that includes Azerbaijan, have been greatly influenced by early agricultural populations in the area; later population movements, such as those of Turkic speakers, also contributed. However, as of 2017, there is no whole genome sequencing study for Azerbaijan; sampling limitations such as these prevent forming a "finer-scale picture of the genetic history of the region".

A 2014 study comparing the genetics of the populations from Armenia, Georgia, Azerbaijan, (which were grouped as "Western Silk Road") Kazakhstan, Uzbekistan, and Tajikistan (grouped as "Eastern Silk Road") found that the samples from Azerbaijan were the only group from the Western Silk Road to show significant contribution from the Eastern Silk Road, despite the overall clustering with the other samples from the Western Silk Road. The eastern input into the Azerbaijani genetics was estimated to be roughly 25 generations ago, corresponding to the time of the Mongolian expansion.

A 2002 study focusing on eleven Y-chromosome markers suggested that Azerbaijanis are genetically more related to their Caucasian geographic neighbors than to their linguistic neighbors. Iranian Azerbaijanis are genetically more similar to northern Azerbaijanis and the neighboring Turkic population than they are to geographically distant Turkmen populations. Iranian-speaking populations from Azerbaijan (the Talysh and Tats) are genetically closer to Azerbaijanis of the Republic than to other Iranian-speaking populations (Persian people and Kurds from Iran, Ossetians, and Tajiks). Several genetic studies suggested that the Azerbaijanis originate from a native population long resident in the area who adopted a Turkic language through language replacement, including possibility of elite dominance scenario. However, the language replacement in Azerbaijan (and in Turkey) might not have been in accordance with the elite dominance model, with estimated Central Asian contribution to Azerbaijan being 18% for females and 32% for males. A subsequent study also suggested 33% Central Asian contribution to Azerbaijan.

A 2001 study which looked into the first hypervariable segment of the MtDNA suggested that "genetic relationships among Caucasus populations reflect geographical rather than linguistic relationships", with Armenians and Azerbaijanis being "most closely related to their nearest geographical neighbours". Another 2004 study that looked into 910 MtDNAs from 23 populations in the Iranian plateau, the Indus Valley, and Central Asia suggested that populations "west of the Indus basin, including those from Iran, Anatolia [Turkey] and the Caucasus, exhibit a common mtDNA lineage composition, consisting mainly of western Eurasian lineages, with a very limited contribution from South Asia and eastern Eurasia". While genetic analysis of mtDNA indicates that Caucasian populations are genetically closer to Europeans than to Near Easterners, Y-chromosome results indicate closer affinity to Near Eastern groups.

The range of haplogroups across the region may reflect historical genetic admixture, perhaps as a result of invasive male migrations.

In a comparative study (2013) on the complete mitochondrial DNA diversity in Iranians has indicated that Iranian Azeris are more related to the people of Georgia, than they are to other Iranians, as well as to Armenians. However the same multidimensional scaling plot shows that Azeris from the Caucasus, despite their supposed common origin with Iranian Azeris, "occupy an intermediate position between the Azeris/Georgians and Turks/Iranians grouping".

A 2007 study which looked into class two Human leukocyte antigen suggested that there were "no close genetic relationship was observed between Azeris of Iran and the people of Turkey or Central Asians". A 2017 study which looked into HLA alleles put the samples from Azeris in Northwest Iran "in the Mediterranean cluster close to Kurds, Gorgan, Chuvash (South Russia, towards North Caucasus), Iranians and Caucasus populations (Svan and Georgians)". This Mediterranean stock includes "Turkish and Caucasian populations". Azeri samples were also in a "position between Mediterranean and Central Asian" samples, suggesting Turkification "process caused by Oghuz Turkic tribes could also contribute to the genetic background of Azeri people". In a 2019 study examining genome-wide data from selected populations in North Africa and West Eurasia, Azeris were grouped with Balkars, Circassians, Georgians, Lezgins, and Turkish people.

== Demographics and society ==
Azerbaijani-speaking regions

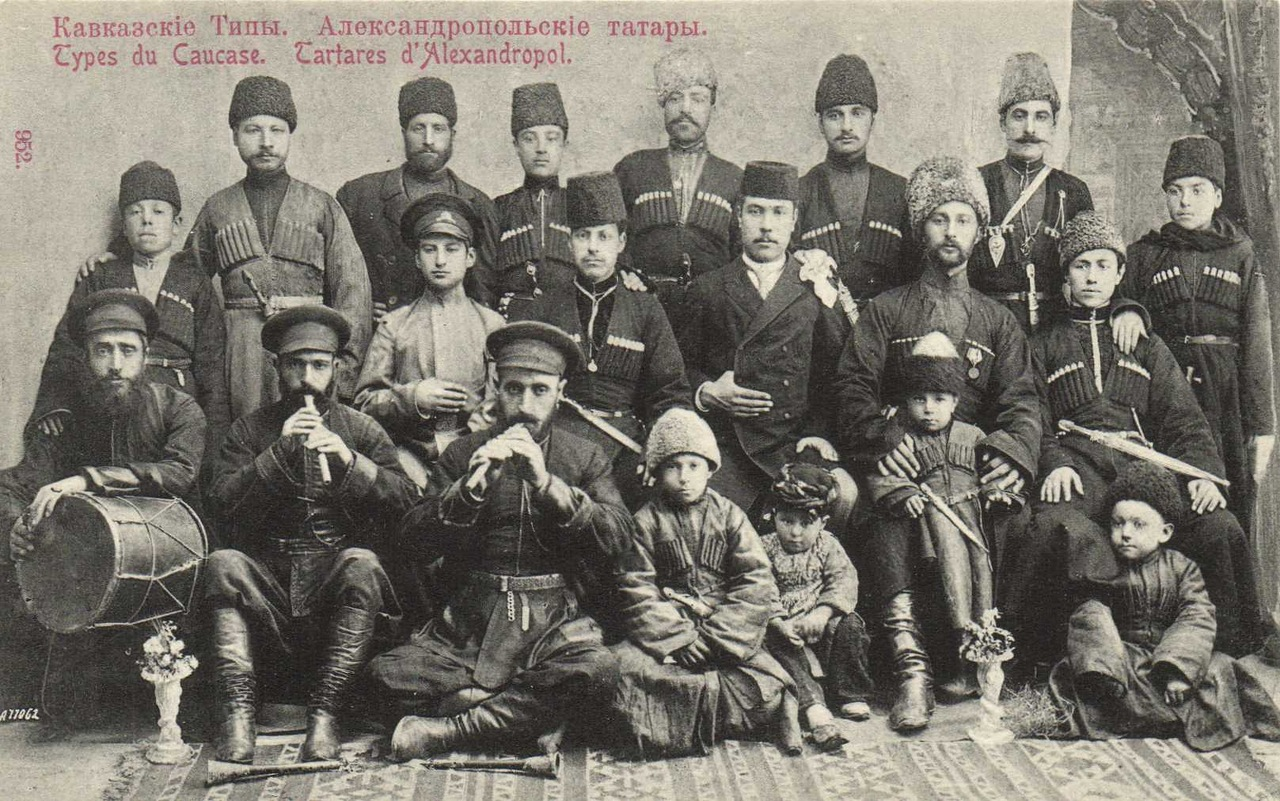
Russian Empire postcard depicting Tatars (i.e. Azerbaijanis) from Alexandropol (Gyumri)

The vast majority of Azerbaijanis live in the Republic of Azerbaijan and Iranian Azerbaijan. Between 12 and 23 million Azerbaijanis live in Iran, mainly in the northwestern provinces. Approximately 9.1 million Azerbaijanis are found in the Republic of Azerbaijan. A diaspora of over a million is spread throughout the rest of the world. According to Ethnologue, there are over 1 million speakers of the northern Azerbaijani dialect in southern Dagestan, Estonia, Georgia, Kazakhstan, Kyrgyzstan, Russian proper, Turkmenistan, and Uzbekistan. No Azerbaijanis were recorded in the 2001 census in Armenia, where the Nagorno-Karabakh conflict resulted in population shifts. Other sources, such as national censuses, confirm the presence of Azerbaijanis throughout the other states of the former Soviet Union.

=== In the Republic of Azerbaijan ===
Azerbaijanis are by far the largest ethnic group in The Republic of Azerbaijan (over 90%), holding the second-largest community of ethnic Azerbaijanis after neighboring Iran. The literacy rate is very high, and is estimated at 99.5%. Azerbaijan began the twentieth century with institutions based upon those of Russia and the Soviet Union, with an official policy of atheism and strict state control over most aspects of society. Since independence, there is a secular system.

Azerbaijan has benefited from the oil industry, but high levels of corruption have prevented greater prosperity for the population. Despite these problems, there is a financial rebirth in Azerbaijan as positive economic predictions and an active political opposition appear determined to improve the lives of average Azerbaijanis.

=== In Iran ===
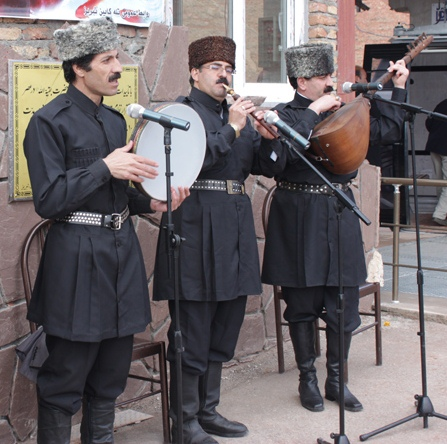
Ashiks performance in Tabriz

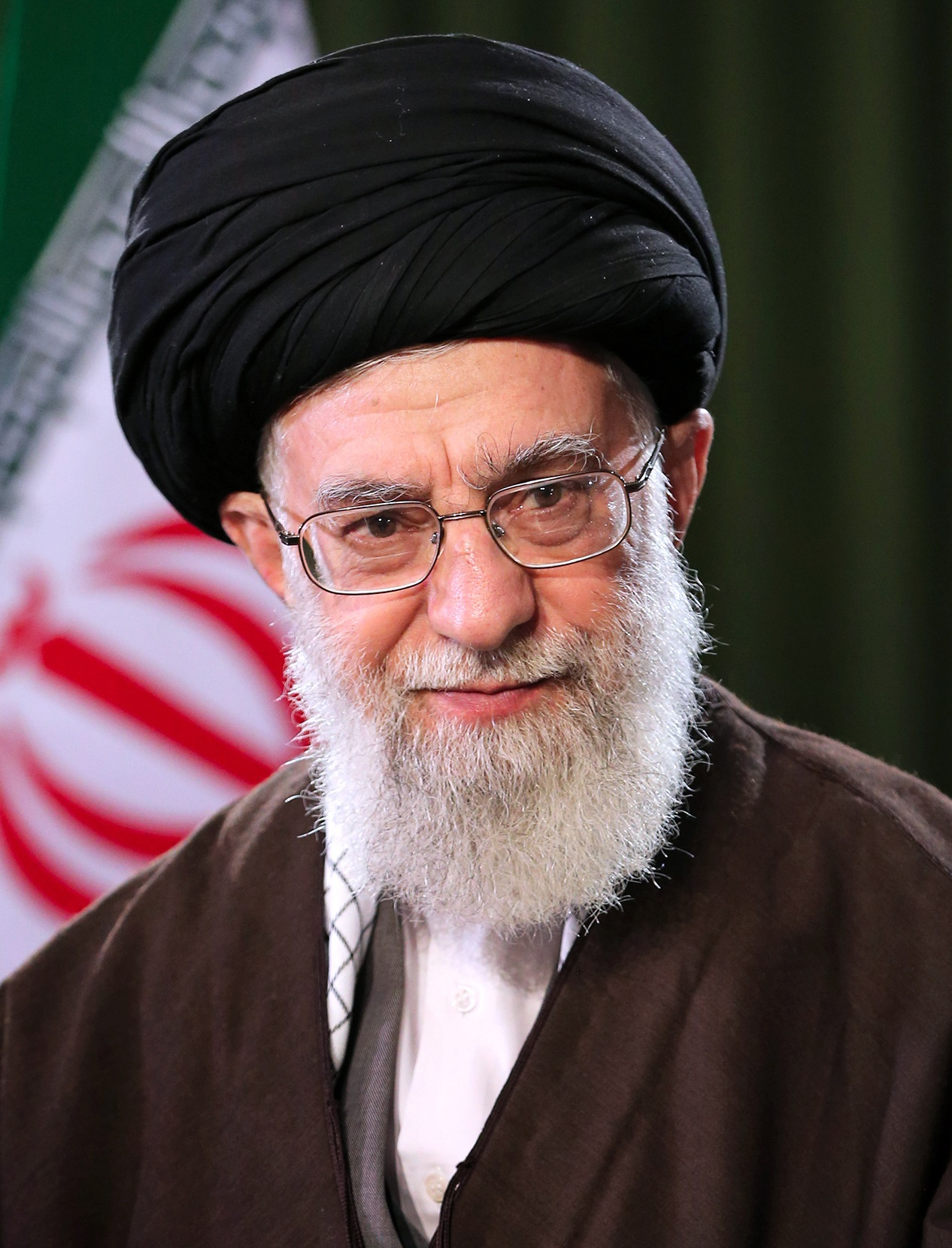
Iran's former highest-ranking official, the supreme leader Ali Khamenei, was Iranian Azeri on his father's side.

The exact number of Azerbaijanis in Iran is heavily disputed. Since the early twentieth century, successive Iranian governments have avoided publishing statistics on ethnic groups. Unofficial population estimates of Azerbaijanis in Iran are around the 16% area put forth by the CIA and Library of Congress. An independent poll in 2009 placed the figure at around 20–22%. According to the Iranologist Victoria Arakelova in peer-reviewed journal Iran and the Caucasus, estimating the number of Azeris in Iran has been hampered for years since the dissolution of the Soviet Union, when the "once invented theory of the so called separated nation (i.e. the citizens of the Azerbaijan Republic, the so-called Azerbaijanis, and the Azaris in Iran), was actualised again (see in detail Reza 1993)". Arakelova adds that the number of Azeris in Iran, featuring in the politically biased publications as "Azerbaijani minority of Iran", is considered to be the "highly speculative part of this theory". Even though all Iranian censuses of population distinguish exclusively religious minorities, numerous sources have presented different figures regarding Iran's Turkic-speaking communities, without "any justification or concrete references".

In the early 1990s, right after the collapse of the Soviet Union, the most popular figure depicting the number of "Azerbaijanis" in Iran was thirty-three million, at a time when the entire population of Iran was barely sixty million. Therefore, at the time, half of Iran's citizens were considered "Azerbaijanis". Shortly after, this figure was replaced by thirty million, which became "almost a normative account on the demographic situation in Iran, widely circulating not only among academics and political analysts, but also in the official circles of Russia and the West". Then, in the 2000s, the figure decreased to 20 million; this time, at least within the Russian political establishment, the figure became "firmly fixed". This figure, Arakelova adds, has been widely used and kept up to date, only with a few minor adjustments. A cursory look at Iran's demographic situation however, shows that all these figures have been manipulated and were "definitely invented on political purpose". Arakelova estimates the number of Azeris i.e. "Azerbaijanis" in Iran based on Iran's population demographics at 6 to 6.5 million.

Azerbaijanis in Iran are mainly found in the northwest provinces: West Azerbaijan, East Azerbaijan, Ardabil, Zanjan, parts of Hamadan, Qazvin, and Markazi. Azerbaijani minorities live in the Qorveh and Bijar counties of Kurdistan, in Gilan, as ethnic enclaves in Galugah in Mazandaran, around Lotfabad and Dargaz in Razavi Khorasan, and in the town of Gonbad-e Qabus in Golestan. Large Azerbaijani populations can also be found in central Iran (Tehran and Alborz) due to internal migration. Azerbaijanis make up 25% of Tehran's population and 30.3% – 33% of the population of the Tehran Province, where Azerbaijanis are found in every city. They are the largest ethnic groups after Persians in Tehran and the Tehran Province. Arakelova notes that the widespread "cliché" among residents of Tehran on the number of Azerbaijanis in the city ("half of Tehran consists of Azerbaijanis"), cannot be taken "seriously into consideration". Arakelova adds that the number of Tehran's inhabitants who have migrated from northwestern areas of Iran, who are currently Persian-speakers "for the most part", is not more than "several hundred thousands", with the maximum being one million. Azerbaijanis have also emigrated and resettled in large numbers in Khorasan, especially in Mashhad.

Generally, Azerbaijanis in Iran were regarded as "a well integrated linguistic minority" by academics prior to Iran's Islamic Revolution. Despite friction, Azerbaijanis in Iran came to be well represented at all levels of "political, military, and intellectual hierarchies, as well as the religious hierarchy".

Resentment came with Pahlavi policies that suppressed the use of the Azerbaijani language in local government, schools, and the press. However, with the advent of the Iranian Revolution in 1979, emphasis shifted away from nationalism as the new government highlighted religion as the main unifying factor. Islamic theocratic institutions dominate nearly all aspects of society. The Azerbaijani language and its literature are banned in Iranian schools. There are signs of civil unrest due to the policies of the Iranian government in Iranian Azerbaijan and increased interaction with fellow Azerbaijanis in Azerbaijan and satellite broadcasts from Turkey and other Turkic countries have revived Azerbaijani nationalism. In May 2006, Iranian Azerbaijan witnessed riots over publication of a cartoon depicting a cockroach speaking Azerbaijani that many Azerbaijanis found offensive. The cartoon was drawn by Mana Neyestani, an Azeri, who was fired along with his editor as a result of the controversy. One of the major incidents that happened recently was Azeris protests in Iran (2015) started in November 2015, after children's television programme Fitileha aired on 6 November on state TV that ridiculed and mocked the accent and language of Azeris and included offensive jokes. As a result, ethnic Azeris protested a program on state TV that contained what they consider an ethnic slur. The head of the country's state broadcaster Islamic Republic of Iran Broadcasting (IRIB) Mohammad Sarafraz has apologized for airing the program, whose broadcast was later discontinued.

Azerbaijanis are an intrinsic community of Iran, and their style of living closely resemble those of Persians:

The lifestyles of urban Azerbaijanis do not differ from those of Persians, and there is considerable intermarriage among the upper classes in cities of mixed populations. Similarly, customs among Azerbaijani villagers do not appear to differ markedly from those of Persian villagers.

Azeris are famously active in commerce and in bazaars all over Iran their voluble voices can be heard. Older Azeri men wear the traditional wool hat, and their music & dances have become part of the mainstream culture. Azeris are well integrated, and many Azeri-Iranians are prominent in Persian literature, politics, and clerical world.

There is significant cross-border trade between Azerbaijan and Iran, and Azerbaijanis from Azerbaijan go into Iran to buy goods that are cheaper, but the relationship was tense until recently. However, relations have significantly improved since the Rouhani administration took office.

=== Subgroups ===
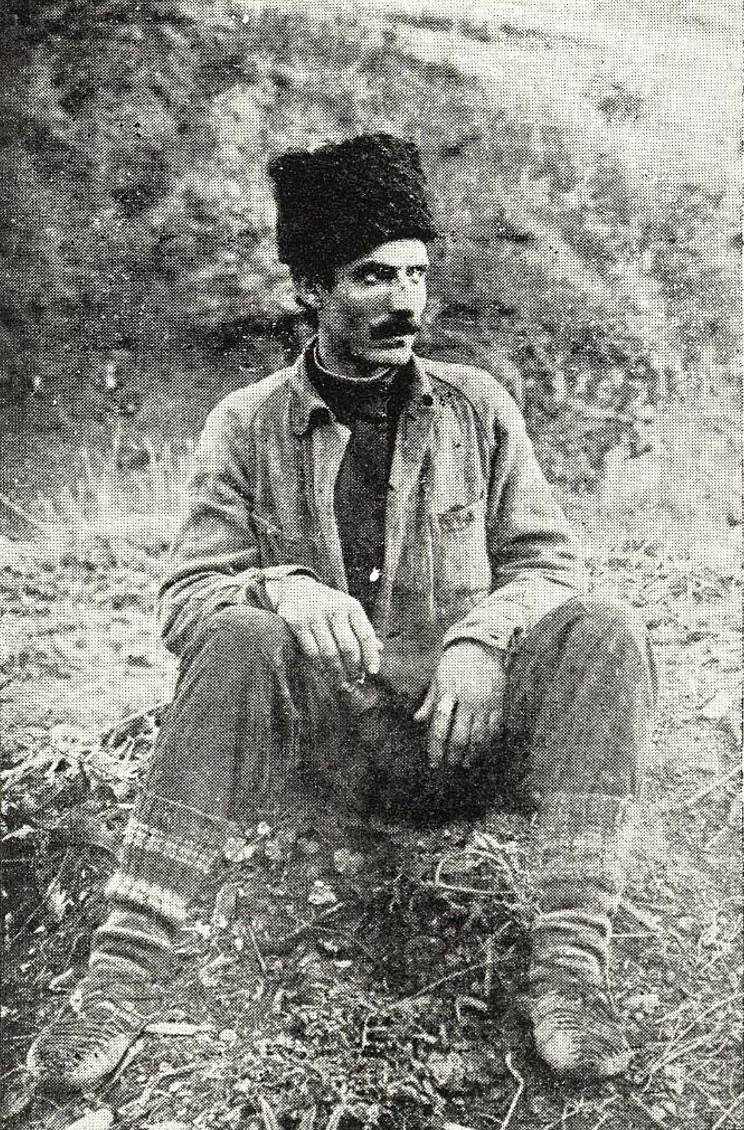
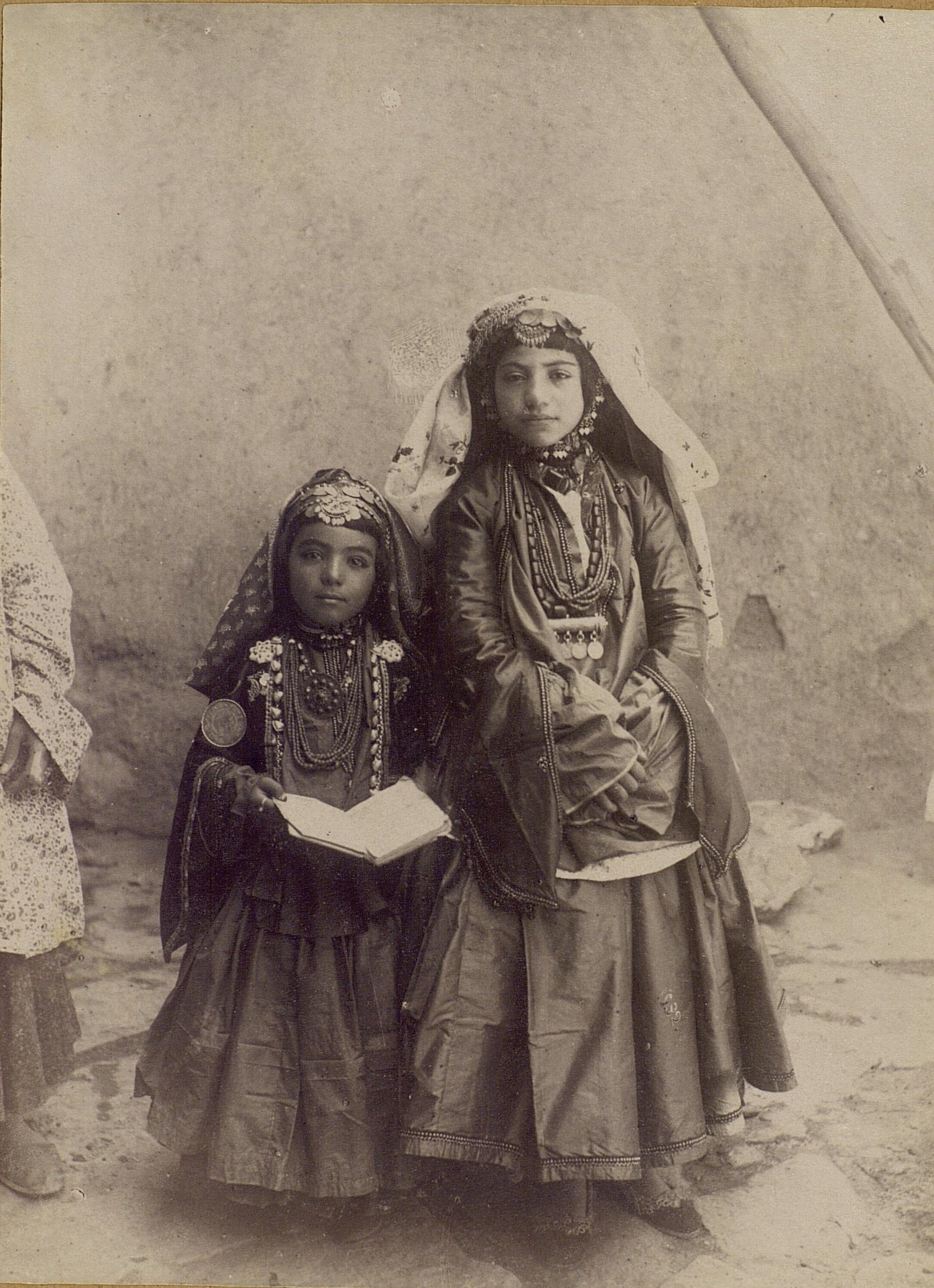
Ayrum from Azerbaijan (left); Shahsevan girls from a rich family. End of the 19th century, Iran (right).

There are at least ten Azerbaijani ethnic groups, each of which has particularities in the economy, culture, and everyday life. Some Azerbaijani ethnic groups continued in the last quarter of the 19th century.

Major Azerbaijani ethnic groups:

- Ayrums
- Afshars
- Bayat
- Qaradaghis
- Qizilbash
- Karapapak
- Padar tribe
- Terekeme
- Shahsevan
- Qajars

=== Women ===
In Azerbaijan, women were granted the right to vote in 1917. Women have attained Western-style equality in major cities such as Baku, although in rural areas more reactionary views remain. Violence against women, including rape, is rarely reported, especially in rural areas, not unlike other parts of the former Soviet Union. In Azerbaijan, the veil was abandoned during the Soviet period. Women are under-represented in elective office but have attained high positions in parliament. An Azerbaijani woman is the Chief Justice of the Supreme Court in Azerbaijan, and two others are Justices of the Constitutional Court. In the 2010 election, women constituted 16% of all MPs (twenty seats in total) in the National Assembly of Azerbaijan. Abortion is available on demand in the Republic of Azerbaijan. Elmira Süleymanova, who served as human rights ombudsman from 2002 to 2019, was a woman.

In Iran, a groundswell of grassroots movements have sought gender equality since the 1980s. Protests in defiance of government bans are dispersed through violence, as on 12 June 2006 when female demonstrators in Haft Tir Square in Tehran were beaten. Past Iranian leaders, such as the reformer ex-president Mohammad Khatami promised women greater rights, but the Guardian Council of Iran opposes changes that they interpret as contrary to Islamic doctrine. In the 2004 legislative elections, nine women were elected to parliament (Majlis), eight of whom were conservatives. The social fate of Azerbaijani women largely mirrors that of other women in Iran.

== Culture ==
=== Language and literature ===
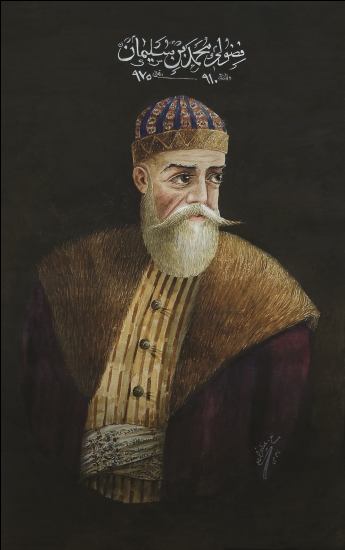
Portrait of Muhammad Fuzûlî by Azim Azimzade (1914). Fuzûlî is considered one of the greatest Azerbaijani poets

The Azerbaijanis speak the Azerbaijani language, a Turkic language descended from the branches of Oghuz Turkic language that became established in Azerbaijan in the 11th and 12th centuries CE. The Azerbaijani language is closely related to Qashqai, Gagauz, Turkish, Turkmen and Crimean Tatar, sharing varying degrees of mutual intelligibility with each of those languages. Certain lexical and grammatical differences formed within the Azerbaijani language as spoken in the Republic of Azerbaijan and Iran, after nearly two centuries of separation between the communities speaking the language; mutual intelligibility, however, has been preserved. Additionally, the Turkish and Azerbaijani languages are mutually intelligible to a high enough degree that their speakers can have simple conversations without prior knowledge of the other.

Early literature was mainly based on oral tradition, and the later compiled epics and heroic stories of Dede Korkut probably derive from it. The first written, classical Azerbaijani literature arose after the Mongol invasion, while the first accepted Oghuz Turkic text goes back to the 15th century. Some of the earliest Azerbaijani writings trace back to the poet Nasimi (died 1417) and then decades later Fuzûlî (1483–1556). Ismail I, Shah of Safavid Iran wrote Azerbaijani poetry under the pen name Khatâ'i.

Modern Azerbaijani literature continued with a traditional emphasis upon humanism, as conveyed in the writings of Samad Vurgun, Shahriar, and many others.

Azerbaijanis are generally bilingual, often fluent in either Russian (in Azerbaijan) or Persian (in Iran) in addition to their native Azerbaijani. As of 1996, around 38% of Azerbaijan's roughly 8,000,000 population spoke Russian fluently. An independent telephone survey in Iran in 2009 reported that 20% of respondents could understand Azerbaijani, the most spoken minority language in Iran, and all respondents could understand Persian.

=== Religion ===
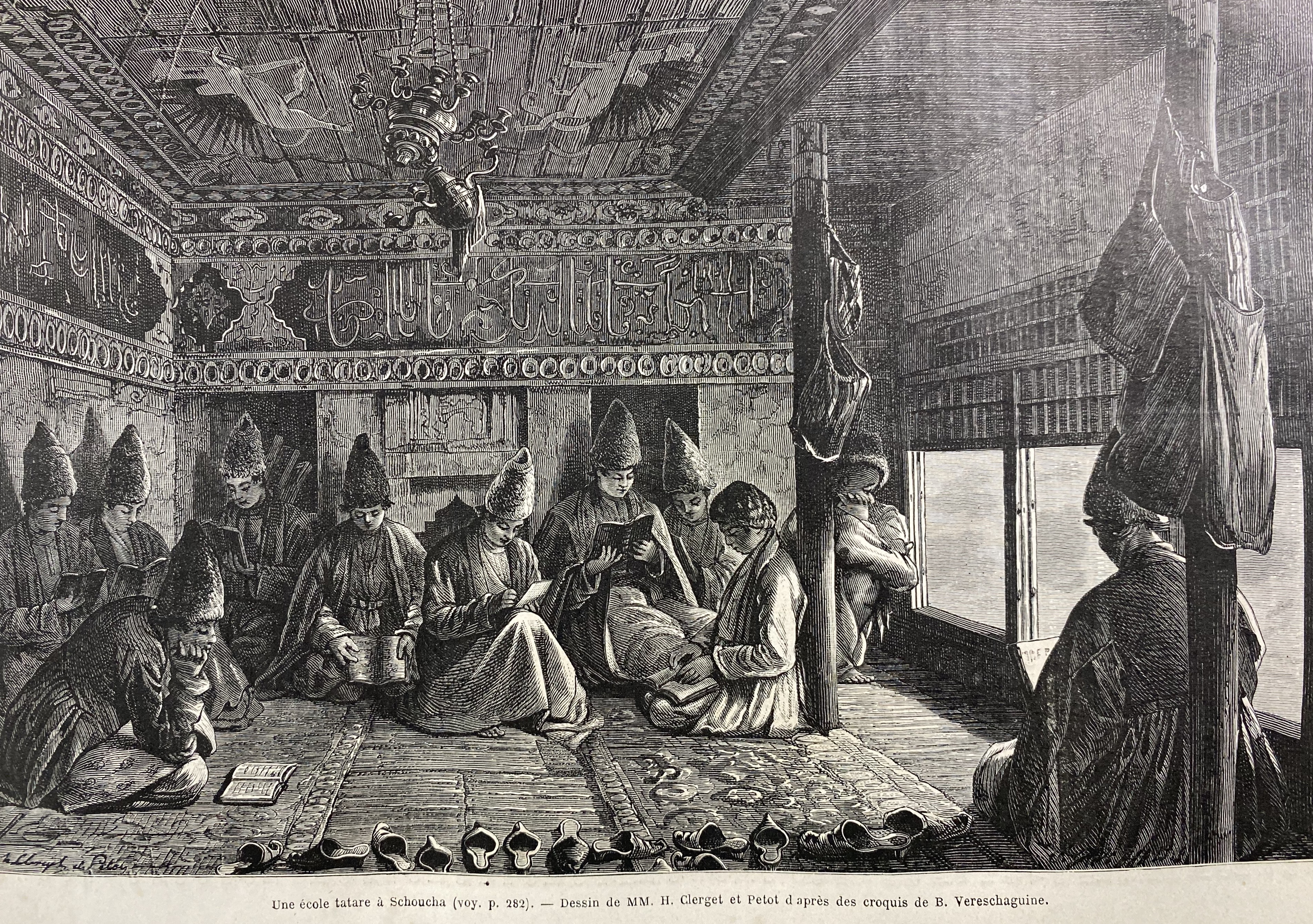
Azerbaijani madrasa in Karabakh, 1865

The majority of Azerbaijanis are Twelver Shi'a Muslims. Religious minorities include Sunni Muslims (mainly Shafi'i just like other Muslims in the surrounding North Caucasus), and Baháʼís. An unknown number of Azerbaijanis in the Republic of Azerbaijan have no religious affiliation. Many describe themselves as Shia Muslims. There is a small number of Naqshbandi Sufis among Muslim Azerbaijanis. Christian Azerbaijanis number around 5,000 people in the Republic of Azerbaijan and consist mostly of recent converts. Some Azerbaijanis from rural regions retain pre-Islamic animist or Zoroastrian-influenced beliefs, such as the sanctity of certain sites and the veneration of fire, certain trees and rocks. In Azerbaijan, traditions from other religions are often celebrated in addition to Islamic holidays, including Nowruz and Christmas.

=== Performing arts ===
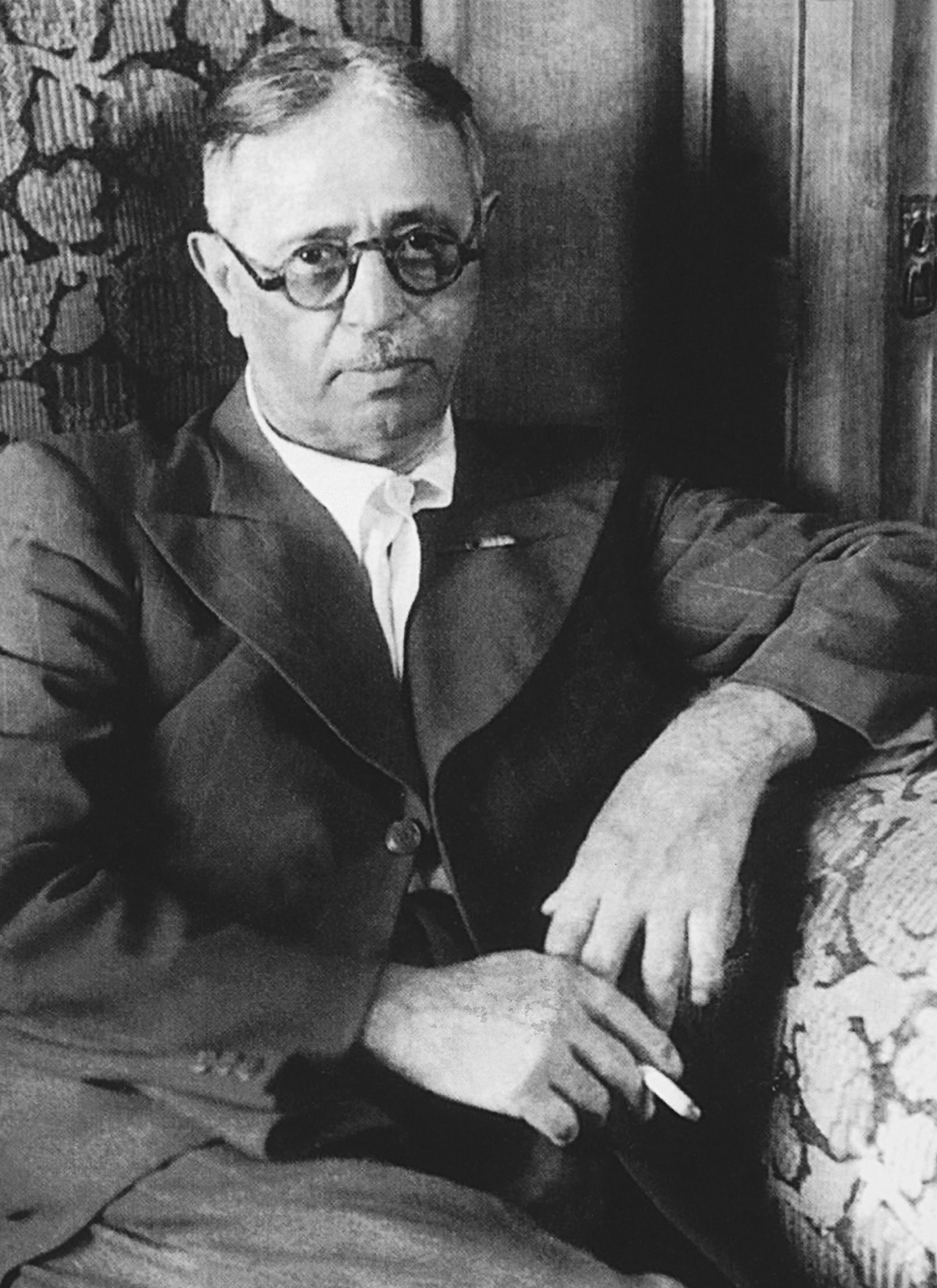
Uzeyir Hajibeyov, Azerbaijani composer, musicologist, and teacher. He composed the National Anthem of Azerbaijan, and is often referred to as the father of Azerbaijani classical music

In the group dance the performers come together in a semi-circular or circular formation as, "The leader of these dances often executes special figures as well as signaling and changes in the foot patterns, movements, or direction in which the group is moving, often by gesturing with his or her hand, in which a kerchief is held."

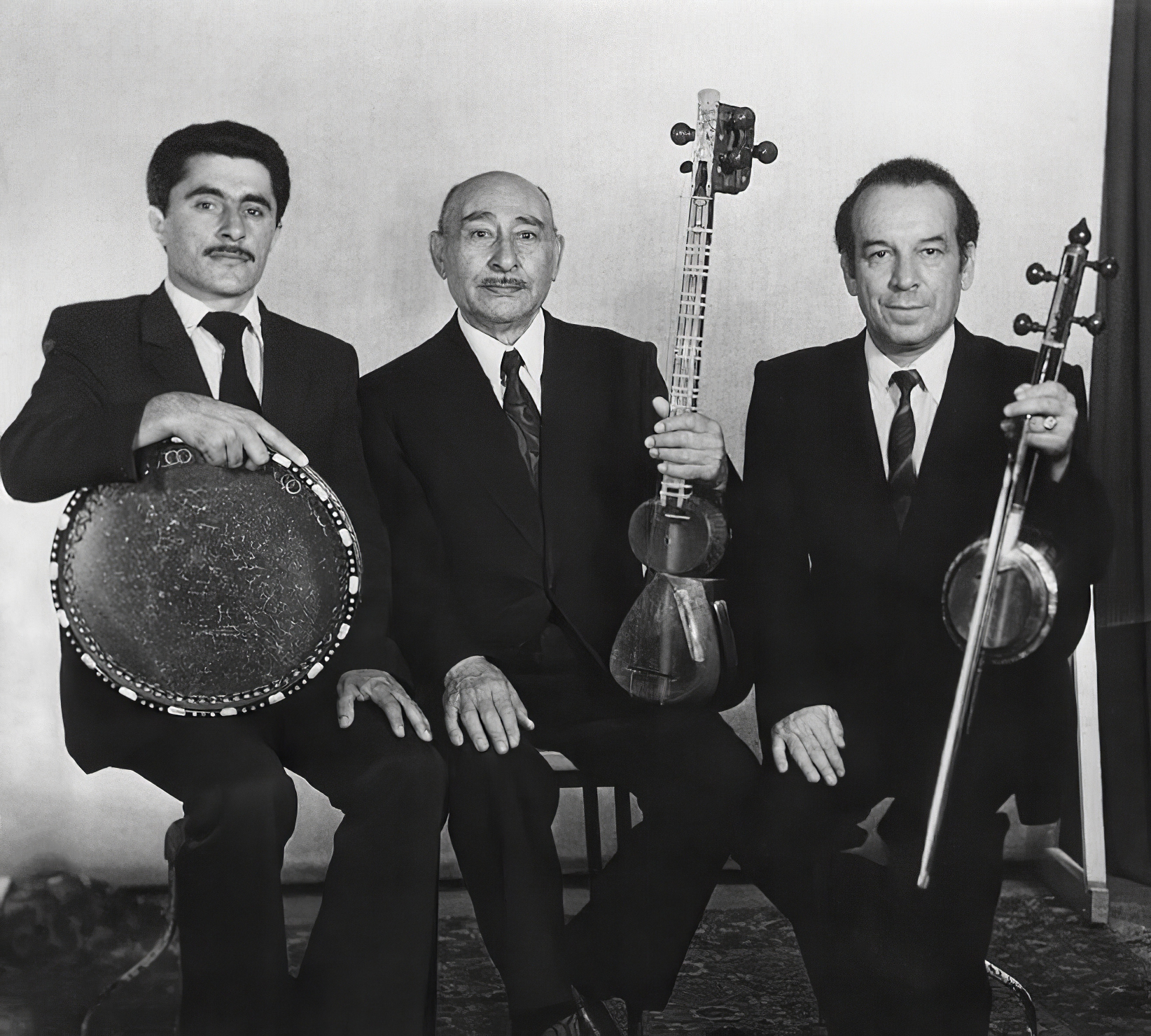
Mugham triads

Azerbaijani musical tradition can be traced back to singing bards called Ashiqs, a vocation that survives. Modern Ashiqs play the saz (lute) and sing dastans (historical ballads). Other musical instruments include the tar (another type of lute), balaban (a wind instrument), kamancha (fiddle), and the dhol (drums). Azerbaijani classical music, called mugham, is often an emotional singing performance. Composers Uzeyir Hajibeyov, Gara Garayev and Fikret Amirov created a hybrid style that combines Western classical music with mugham. Other Azerbaijanis, notably Vagif and Aziza Mustafa Zadeh, mixed jazz with mugham. Some Azerbaijani musicians have received international acclaim, including Rashid Behbudov (who could sing in over eight languages), Muslim Magomayev (a pop star from the Soviet era), Googoosh, and more recently Sami Yusuf.

After the 1979 revolution in Iran due to the clerical opposition to music in general, Azerbaijani music took a different course. According to Iranian singer Hossein Alizadeh, "Historically in Iran, music faced strong opposition from the religious establishment, forcing it to go underground."

Some Azerbaijanis have been film-makers, such as Rustam Ibragimbekov, who wrote Burnt by the Sun, winner of the Grand Prize at the Cannes Film Festival and an Academy Award for Best Foreign Language Film in 1994.

=== Sports ===
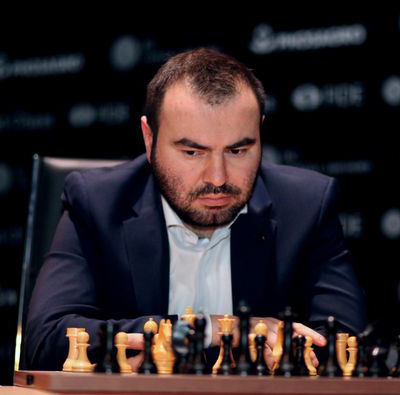
Chess player Shakhriyar Mamedyarov

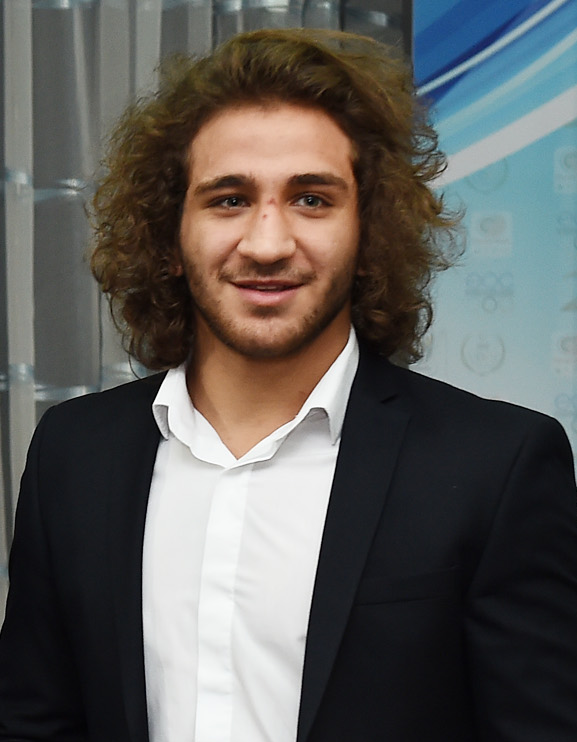
Hidayat Heydarov, Azerbaijani judoka, Olympic Champion, World Champion and a four-time European Champion

Other ancient sports include wrestling, javelin throwing, and fencing. The Soviet legacy has in modern times propelled some Azerbaijanis to become accomplished athletes at the Olympic level. The Azerbaijani government supports the country's athletic legacy and encourages youth participation. Iranian athletes of Azerbaijani origin have particularly excelled in weight lifting, gymnastics, shooting, javelin throwing, karate, boxing, and wrestling. Weight lifters, such as Iran's Hossein Reza Zadeh, world super heavyweight-lifting record holder and two-time Olympic champion in 2000 and 2004, or Hadi Saei, a former Iranian. Ramil Guliyev, an ethnic Azerbaijani who plays for Turkey, became the first world champion in athletics in the history of Turkey. Athletes such as Nizami Pashayev, who won the European heavyweight title in 2006, have excelled at the international level. Chess is another popular pastime in the Republic of Azerbaijan. The strongest players of Azerbaijani origin Vugar Gashimov, Shahriyar Mammadyarov and Teimour Radjabov, all three highly ranked internationally. Karate is also popular, where Rafael Aghayev achieved particular success, becoming a five-time world champion and eleven-time European champion.

== See also ==
- List of Azerbaijanis
- Turkic peoples
- Peoples of the Caucasus
- Iranian Azerbaijanis
- Azerbaijan (Iran)
