= Dahnama =

Azerbaijani poem

Dahnama ده‌نامه
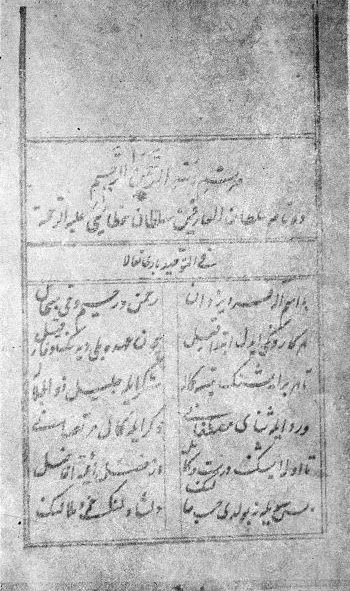
- The title page of the manuscript (1610), Institute of Manuscripts of the National Academy of Sciences of Azerbaijan
- Author: Shah Ismail I
- Language: Ajami Turkic
- Genre: Mathnawi
- Publication date: 1506
- Publication place: Safavid Iran

Dahnama (Azerbaijani/Persian: ده‌نامه, romanized: Dəhnamə) is a poem written in the mathnawi genre by Shah Ismail I (also known as Khata'i) in 1506 in Ajami Turkic, the precursor of the Azerbaijani language. It is a written monument of and one of the first poems in Azerbaijani literature.

Dahnama means "ten letters", as mathnawi contains ten love letters between a young man (that is the poet) and his beloved. In total, the poem contains more than 1400 couplets and includes 1532 bayts.

== Study and publication ==
In 1923, the Azerbaijani researcher Salman Mumtaz published an incomplete list of Dahname from the 17th-century manuscript, which is kept at the Institute of Manuscripts of the National Academy of Sciences of Azerbaijan, in Baku. In the preface to this edition, Mumtaz wrote:

Dahnama is a precious treasure that continues its original strength.

In 1961, Azerbaijani artistic director Azizagha Mammadov prepared a two-volume edition of the poet's works entitled Shah Ismail Khatai, in which he considered the main principles of creating scientific-critical texts for Dahnama.

In 1967, Azerbaijani researcher Gasim Hasanov published his work "Syntax of Dahnama", in which he analysed the definitional phrases in the poem. Back in 1962, Hasanov wrote that the definitional phrases found in the poem are largely identical to those in the modern Azerbaijani language.

In 1977, the Azerbaijani historian Minaye Javadova, in her work "The Lexicon of Shah Ismail Khatai" (Based on the poem "Dahnama") expressed the history of studying the poem Dahnama and the role of the Azerbaijani language during the reign of the Safavids. In this work, Javadova notes that Dahnama occupies a special place in the literary heritage of Khatai, being one of the most popular written literary monuments created in the Azerbaijani language.

== Manuscripts ==
The Bakhter Museum, located in the city of Mazar-i-Sharif in Afghanistan, contains a manuscript rewritten by the calligrapher Mir Iman Gazvin (1552-1613), which begins with the mesnevi "Dahnama". The manuscript of the poem, compiled in the 17th century, is kept in the Institute of Manuscripts of the National Academy of Sciences of Azerbaijan, in Baku.

One of the lists of Dahnama is kept in St. Petersburg, whose first annotated description was provided by the orientalist Nikolai Marr at the request of Vladimir Minorsky in 1923. A detailed annotated description of this list was also made by the Turkish literary critic Ismayil Hikmet in his book The History of Azerbaijani Literature (Baku, 1928).

It is also known that one of the Dahnama manuscripts was handed over to the library of the Azerbaijan State Publishing House in 1923. Its further fate is unknown.

== Literary analysis ==
Dahnama was created in the sphere of the so-called "palace literature". According to the philologist Hasan Guliyev, the poem contains many lyrical digressions written in forms close to folk poetry. Here, the experiences of a couple in love are reflected in a romantic form. Each chapter is a separate, complete, independent "letter-appeal" that brings together the image of the hero-poet and his beloved. The action in the work is slowed down, and the images of the heroes are static. The whole poem is a love monologue, which can also be described as "answers-verses" of the poet’s beloved. These letters, according to Guliyev, contain "the movement of the plot". There is no dynamic and tense intrigue in the poem. The whole story consists of love experiences, which are based on life facts. Despite the presence of the romantic features, the poem retains realistic elements.

In the poem, according to the researcher Gasim Jahani, the traditions of Nizami Ganjavi are noticeable, especially the development of the directions in accordance with the spirit of his love philosophy. Thus, in Khatai's Dahnama an excerpt called "Bahariya" was added, in the creation of which the poet was inspired by the "Praise of Spring" of Nizami's poem Leyli and Majnun.

== See also ==
- Leyli and Majnun

== Literature ==
- Javadova, Minaya (1977). Şah İsmayıl Xətainin leksikası / The Lexicon of Shah Ismail Khatai. Baku: Elm. p. 141.
- Javadi, H.; Burrill, K. (1998). Azerbaijan. Azeri Literature. Baku: Encyclopædia Iranica. p. 251-255.
- Javadova, Minaya (1984). Об истории изучения и языке произведений Хатаи. Baku: Советская тюркология.
- Guliyev, Hasan (2005). Азербайджанская литература. Исторический очерк. Baku: Нурлан. p. 530.
- Jahani, Gasim (1979). Azərbaycan Ədəbiyyatında Nizami ənənələri. Baku: Elm. p. 204.
