= Fitilieh programme protests in Iran =

2015 Azerbaijanis protests in Iran
- Date: 9 November 2015 – 11 November 2015
- Location: Iran
- Caused by: The children's program Fitilehha aired an episode on November 6 depicting an Azeri speaking Iranian brushing his teeth with a toilet brush.
- Methods: Demonstrations
- Result: Fitilehha has been cancelled, the head of the country’s state broadcaster apologized for the episode

The Fitilieh programme protests (Persian: جنجال برنامه فیتیله, lit. 'Controversy of Fitilieh programme') started on 9 November 2015 after a segment of the children's television programme Fitileh, aired on 6 November on local state TV, depicted an Azeri speaking Iranian brushing his teeth with a toilet brush.

As a result, hundreds of people participated in demonstrations in Tabriz, Urmia, Ardabil, Zanjan and Tehran. Police in Iran clashed with protesting people and fired tear gas to disperse crowds, with protesters being arrested. There were also protests held in front of Iranian embassies in Istanbul and Baku.

The head of the country’s state broadcaster Islamic Republic of Iran Broadcasting (IRIB) Mohammad Sarafraz apologized for airing the program. The broadcast of Fitilehha was cancelled, after 12 years of airing.

== See also ==
- Iran newspaper cockroach cartoon controversy

== Sources ==
- Frud Bezhan. Azeris Hold Protests In Iran Over Racial Slur // Radio Free Europe. — 2015. — 9 November.
- Iran’s ethnic Azeris protest slur on TV program // The Washington Post. — 2015. — 9 November.
- Iran's Azeris protest over offensive TV show // BBC. — 2015. — 9 November.
