= Wäisi movement =

Muslim Tartar movement, from late 19th C

The Wäisi movement was a religious, social and political movement in Tatarstan and other Tatar-populated parts of Russia which took place in the late 19th and early 20th centuries. It also incorporated elements of class struggle and nationalism. The primary founder of the movement was Bahawetdin Wäisev. It was related to other movements among Muslims in the Russian Empire and the Soviet Union, such as the Jadid movements.

This movement enjoyed widespread popularity and united Tatar farmers, craftsmen and petty bourgeoisie. After the arrest of Bahawetdin Wäisev in 1884, the number of members remained high. In 1908, there were nearly 15,000 followers in the Kazan Governorate (especially Kazan, Sviyajsk, Arsk uyezds), Orenburg, and other guberniyas, in Central Asia.

The main doctrines of Wäisi were disobedience to civil laws and administration, adherence to the Sharia and Qur'an rather than government regulations, evasion of service in the "kafir" army and of paying imposition, and refusal to obtain the Russian passport featuring a double-headed eagle. After the arrest of Bahawetdin Wäisev and some other leaders, the remaining membership switched to underground work. In 1897, 100 followers of Wäisi were arrested and exiled after they encouraged people not to participate in the population census. Bahawetdin Wäisev died in 1893 during his incarceration. At the beginning of the 20th century his son Gainan assumed the leadership of the movement.

After the First Russian revolution in 1905-1907 the Wäisi movement increased in size and was renovated and reconstituted as Islamic Socialism. After the October Revolution of 1917, Waisi followers supported the Soviet government. Mirsaid Sultan-Galiev and Mullanur Waxitov were among its most influential followers, organising the Muslim Socialist Committee of Kazan. During the Civil War in Russia, Wäisi followers organized a regiment in the Red Army. On February 28th, 1918, Ğaynan Wäisev was assassinated by unknown assailants. In the 1920s, Wäisi movement followers founded the Yaña Bolğar (New Bolghar) commune in Chistopol canton in order to foster the growth of an autonomous Wäisi community. But in the 1930s during the Great Purge, the Wäisis were repressed and the movement faded away.

== Sources ==
- "Вәисиләр хәрәкәте". Tatar Encyclopaedia (in Tatar). Kazan: The Republic of Tatarstan Academy of Sciences. Institution of the Tatar Encyclopaedia. 2002.
