= Kazan electoral district =

Constituency of the Russian Republic

Kazan
- Former Civilian constituency for the All-Russian Constituent Assembly
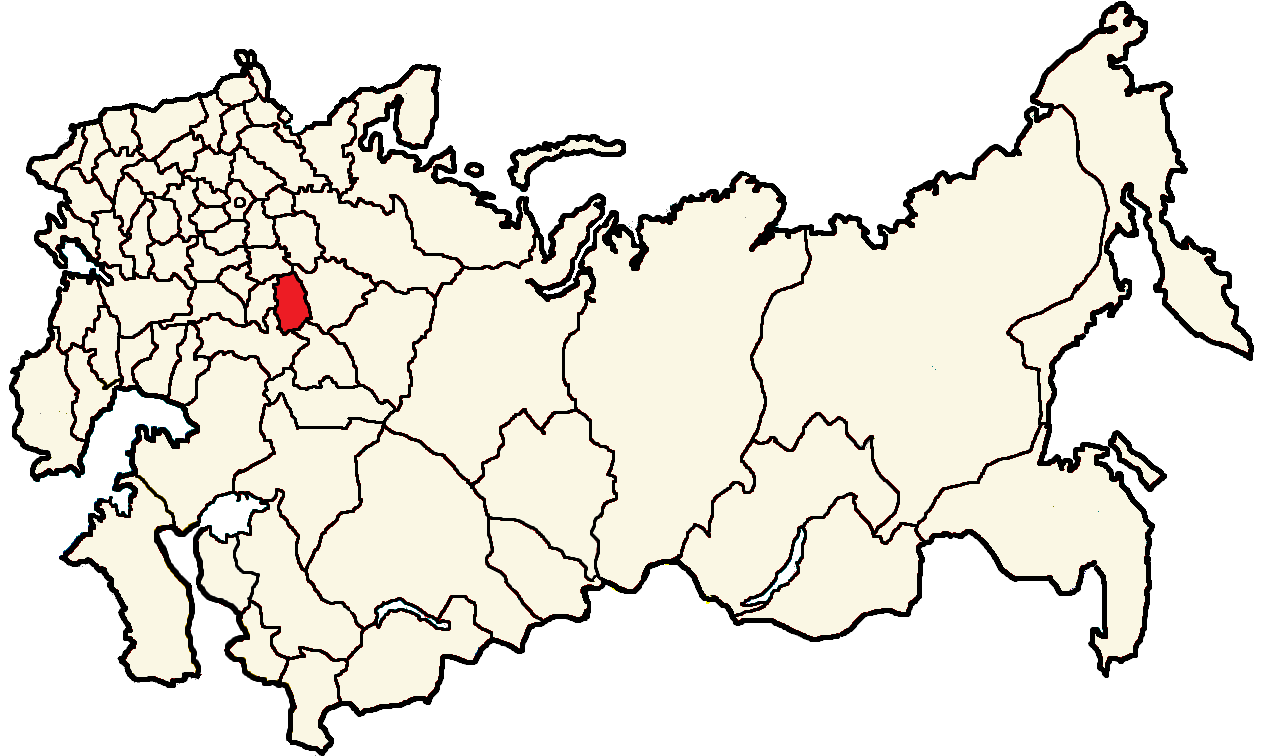

Former constituency
- Created: 1917
- Abolished: 1918
- Number of members: 12
- Number of Uyezd Electoral Commissions: 12
- Number of Urban Electoral Commissions: 1
- Number of Parishes: 182

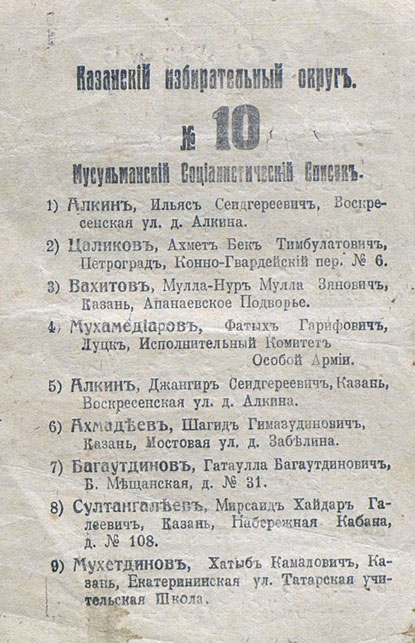
The ballot of the Muslim Socialist list in Kazan

The Kazan electoral district (Russian: Казанский избирательный округ) was a constituency created for the 1917 Russian Constituent Assembly election.

The electoral district covered the Kazan Governorate. The constituency was assigned 12 seats in the Constituent Assembly.

Notably, local SR party branch was dominated by leftist elements.

A 66% turnout was reported. The Chuvash people largely voted for the SRs. The Tatar voters were split between leftist and rightist lists. In Kazan city itself the Bolsheviks were the most voted party, with 21,118 votes (26.1%), followed by the Kadets with 20,044 votes (24.8%), the SRs with 15,356 votes (18.9%), Muslim Socialists 12,730 votes (15.7%), Orthodox list 3,215 votes (4%), Mensheviks 2,605 votes (3.2%), Muslim Assembly 2,304 votes (2.8%), right-wing SRs 1,681 votes (2.1%), Cooperative-Independent Socialists 802 votes (1%), Chuvash 696 votes (0.8%) and the Agricultural-Artisan-Commercial-Industrial list 508 votes (0.6%). In the Kazan garrison the Bolsheviks got 10,706 votes (40.8%), SRs 9,177 votes (34.9%), Muslim Socialists 3,156 votes (12%), Kadets 1,686 votes (6.4%), Chuvash 577 votes (2.2%), Mensheviks 400 votes (1.5%), right-wing SRs 305 votes (1.2%), Cooperative-Independent Socialists 162 votes (0.6%), Agricultural-Artisan-Commercial Industrial list 51 votes (0.2%), Orthodox list 48 votes (0.1%) and the Muslim Assembly 40 votes (0.1%).

== Results ==
Kazan
Party	Vote	%
List 11 - The Kazan Governorate Organization of the Socialist-Revolutionaries and the Soviet of Peasants Deputies	264,158	30.77
List 1 - The All Chuvash National Congress, the Chuvash Military Committees and the Chuvash Organization of the Socialist Revolutionary Party	226,496	26.38
List 10 - Muslim Socialist Committee	153,151	17.84
List 4 - Kazan Governorate Muslim Assembly	99,080	11.54
List 7 - Bolsheviks	51,936	6.05
List 2 - Kadets	31,728	3.70
List 6 - Orthodox Clergy and Laymen of the Kazan Governorate	12,322	1.44
List 9 - Right-wing Socialist-Revolutionaries	9,820	1.14
List 5 - Mensheviks	4,906	0.57
List 3 - Cooperatives and Independent Socialists	2,993	0.35
List 8 - Agricultural-Artisan-Commercial-Industrial group	2,001	0.23
Total:	858,591	

Deputies Elected
Alyunov	Chuvash
Nikolaev	Chuvash
Vasiliev	Chuvash
Alkin	Muslim Socialist
Waxitov	Muslim Socialist
Kolegaev	SR
Martyushin	SR
Mayorov	SR
Mokhov	SR
Sukhanov	SR
Khalfin	Muslim Assembly
Salekhov	Muslim Assembly
