= İsmail Firdevs =

Crimean Tatar Bolshevik revolutionary (1888–1937)

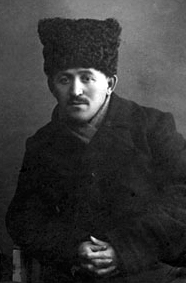
- Firdevs in 1919
- Born: İsmail Kerim oğlu Kerimcanov; 2 December 1888; Simferopol, Taurida Governorate, Russian Empire (now Crimea)
- Died: 27 October 1937; Sandarmokh, Karelian ASSR, Russian SFSR, Soviet Union (now Republic of Karelia, Russia)
- Other name: İsmail Firdevs
- Political party: All-Union Communist Party (Bolshevik) (1917–1929)

İsmail Kerim oğlu Kerimcanov (20 November 1888 [O.S. 2 December] 1888 – 27 October 1937), better known under the adopted pseudonym of Firdevs, was a Crimean Tatar Bolshevik revolutionary and compatriot of Mirsaid Sultan-Galiev.

== Early life and career ==
İsmail Kerim oğlu Kerimcanov was born in the city of Simferopol, in Crimea, into a family of merchants. At the age of 7, he became an orphan. He graduated with honours from the Simferopol Tatar Teaching Academy in 1906, and became an educator, working in Simferopol, Alushta, and Autka. In his status as an educator, he became a popular tutor for aristocrats' children. Firdevs was self-taught in German, French, and Turkish, and additionally understood some Italian and Latin. He adopted the pseudonym 'Firdevs' (Arabic: فردوس, romanized: firdaws) from the Arabic word for paradise, in reference to what was regarded by those he tutored as his peaceful, paradise-like demeanor.

In 1913, Firdevs was deprived of his right to teach after he was charged with criticising the Tsars. In 1917, he became a member of the Russian Social Democratic Labour Party, becoming the party's first Crimean Tatar member.

== Russian Civil War ==
Beginning in January 1918, Firdevs took an active part in the takeover of the Crimean peninsula by communist forces. In this endeavour, he was one of the foremost opponents of the Crimean People's Republic. Firdevs served as People's Commissar for Foreign and National Affairs within the Taurida Soviet Socialist Republic, and became Secretary of the Muskom in 1918. He held the latter position until 1920. As Secretary of the Muskom, he came into contact with Mirsaid Sultan-Galiev and Mullanur Waxitov. Both men had a significant impact on Firdevs, and he soon became an ardent supporter of Sultan-Galiev's ideology of national communism. In 1919, he became a member of the Kazan Regional Committee of the Russian Communist Party. From 1920 to 1921, he served as People's Commissar of Public Education in the Crimean Autonomous Soviet Socialist Republic, before next becoming People's Commissar of Justice. He served in that post until 1924.

== Downfall ==
In 1924, Firdevs was removed from his leading positions. His removal followed a heated debate over the arrest of Sultan-Galiev, when Firdevs came to his defence in contrast with other Bolsheviks, who supported Sultan-Galiev's arrest. Following the debate, Joseph Stalin condemned both, saying, "Ideologically, Firdevs is more likely to lead to Sultan-Galiev than vice versa."

From 1926 to 1929, Firdevs worked as an inspector to the North Caucasian Department of People's Education, based in Rostov-on-Don.

In 1929, Firdevs was arrested and charged with involvement in a nationalist, pan-Turkic, and pan-Islamic organisation. He was removed from the All-Union Communist Party and sent to Solovki prison camp, where he shared a cell with Sultan-Galiev and Osman Abdulğani Deren-Ayırlı, another disgraced Crimean Tatar Bolshevik and supporter of Crimean Tatar expression. Deren-Ayırlı condemned national communism and his two cellmates. In 1930, Firdevs was sentenced to death, but his sentence was changed to ten years of hard labour on 8 January 1931.

== Death ==
After prolonged time at Solovki, Firdevs, Sultan-Galiev, and Deren-Ayırlı all condemned their previous political activities. Sultan-Galiev was released in 1934, and Deren-Ayırlı in 1935. Firdevs, however, was refused release, as Stalin viewed him as a more serious threat to his rule than both of his cellmates. According to Soviet authorities, Firdevs was additionally involved in spreading propaganda amongst Solovki prisoners. As a result, on 9 October 1937, Firdevs was again sentenced to death by a NKVD troika. On 27 October 1937, he was executed.

On 14 March 1989, Firdevs' case was reviewed by the Presidium of the Supreme Soviet, and he was rehabilitated. On 12 May 1990, the Tatarstan Regional Committee of the Communist Party of the Soviet Union conducted its own review of the case, and rehabilitated him within the party.
