= Islamism (disambiguation) =

Islamism may refer to:

== Politics ==
- Islamic socialism, a political philosophy that incorporates elements of Islam into a system of socialism.
- Revolutionary Salafism
