= Zhizn' Natsional'nostei =

- Discipline: Interdisciplinary
- Language: Russian

Publication details
- History: 1918-1924; 1992–present
- Publisher: Narkomnats (USSR)
- Frequency: Weekly 1918–1923, then monthly

Zhizn' Natsional'nostei (Жизнь национальностей, Life of the Nationalities) was a journal published in Moscow from 1918 to 1924. Many senior figures in Narkomnats contributed to it.

The journal's publication was resumed in 1992, whereon it was circulated through the Commonwealth of Independent States.

== Notable articles ==
- 'The Social Revolution and the East' by Mirsäyet Soltanğäliev, 38(46) 1919
- by Sultan Majid Afandiyev, 25 (33), 6 July 1919
