= Islamic socialism =

Type of socialist philosophy

Islamic socialism is a political philosophy that incorporates elements of Islam into a system of socialism. As a term, it was coined by various left-wing Muslim leaders to describe a more spiritual form of socialism. Islamic socialists believe that the teachings of the Qur'an and hadith, citing aspects of the religion like zakat, are not only compatible with principles of socialism, but also very supportive of them.

Some early figures in Islam, such as Abu Dharr al-Ghifari, a companion of Muhammad, and the first Caliph, Abu Bakr, are sometimes regarded as forerunners of Islamic socialism for their advocacy of wealth redistribution. Interest in fusing Islam and socialism emerged in the nineteenth century, with Islamic Reformist thinker Jamal al-Din al-Afghani, whose writings on the topic were published in the 1930s and influenced many later thinkers. Social movements such as the Wäisi movement in Tatarstan, in the Russian empire, similarly drew on Islamic and socialist thought. In the twentieth century, the Indian Deobandi scholar Ubaidullah Sindhi, the Movement of God-Worshipping Socialists in Iran, the Muslim League in Pakistan, and the Iranian scholar Ali Shariati are among those to play a role in the history of the ideology.

== History ==
=== Early Islam ===
Abu Dharr al-Ghifari, a companion of Muhammad, is credited by some twentieth century scholars, such as Egyptian Muhammad Sharqawi and Sami Ayad Hanna, as well as by Ali Shariati (who translated his texts into Persian), as an early antecedent of Islamic socialism. He protested against the accumulation of wealth by the ruling class during Uthman's caliphate and urged the equitable redistribution of wealth.

The first Muslim Caliph Abu Bakr introduced a guaranteed minimum standard of income, granting each man, woman and child ten dirhams annually—this was later increased to twenty dirhams.

=== Islamic Reformism ===
In the 1890s, the Islamic Reformist thinker Jamal al-Din al-Afghani discussed topics of "Socialism and Social Justice" (Ar. al-ishtirākiyya wa al-ʿadāla al-ijtimāʿiyya) during his stay in Paris. However, his thought was only published in a collection edited by Muḥammad al-Makhzūmi in 1931 due to censorship issues in the late Ottoman Empire. Al-Makhzumi notes that al-Afghani conversed with divergent schools of thought, among them sympathisers with European Socialism whom he saw as "extravagant" and "wasteful". He juxtaposed this with Islamic Socialism, which, he argued, was professed by the early caliphs and saḥāba (companions of the prophet), among them Abu Dharr.

As a response to a question about European socialism by "a prominent Turkish man of letters" about the value of socialism in Europe, al-Afghani proclaimed that socialism had already been practiced by the Arabs even before the coming of Muhammad's revelation. He evokes the charitable Arab poet Hatim al-Ta'i as proof of the generosity during that time. This generosity, where the person retained their personal right to property, but saw it as their duty to provide for people in need, was retained and given divine ordinance in the Qur'an. Al-Afghani cites several Qur'anic verses to showcase the call for mutual responsibility, charity, and the opposition to improper profit or usury (riba; such as Q 8:41, 2:271, 2:275-276, 9:60).

In al-Afghani's account of the formative period of Islam, he understands Abu Bakr and Umar to have successfully lived by the standards of Islamic Socialism. During the reign of Uthman, however, extravagance would have taken over the Muslim leaders of Egypt, Syria, and Iraq. Abu Dharr, one of the first converts to Islam, confronted the governor of Syria, Mu'awiyya, with this fact, but, after an attempt to bribe Abu Dharr, Mu'awiyya sent him away to the Caliph. It was over this matter that Abu Dharr chose to resign to al-Rabadha away from the Muslim community. This historical narrative would be expanded and resuscitated by later advocates of Islamic Socialism.

=== Russia and the Soviet Union, 1890s-1920s ===
According to Sami A. Hanna and Hanif Ramay, one of the first expressions of Islamic socialism was the Wäisi movement in Tatarstan, Russia, in the late 19th and early 20th centuries. The movement opposed the rule of the Russian Empire and was supported by Muslim farmers, peasants and petite bourgeoisie. It suffered repression by the Russian authorities and went underground in the early 20th century, when it started cooperating with communists, socialists and social democrats in anti-government activity, and started identifying itself as an Islamic socialist movement in the wake of the 1905 Russian Revolution. The movement aligned with the Bolsheviks during the Russian Revolution of 1917, during which the movement also established the first experimental Islamic commune. The Muslim Socialist Committee of Kazan was also active at this time. After the death of Lenin in 1924, the Wäisi movement asserted its independence from the Communist Party; however, it was suppressed during the Great Purge in the 1930s.

Soviet decision makers recognized that revolutionary activity along the Soviet Union's southern border would draw the attention of capitalist powers and invite them to intervene. It was this understanding which prompted the Russian representation at the Baku Congress in September 1920 to reject the arguments of the national communists as impractical and counterproductive to the revolution in general, without elaborating their fear that the safety of Russia lay in the balance. It was this understanding, coupled with the Russian Bolsheviks' displeasure at seeing another revolutionary center proposed in their own domain, that galvanized them into action against the national communists.

=== Turkey, 1910s ===
According to Özgür Yılmaz, Hüseyin Hilmi, the founder of Turkish socialism, as well as his journal İştirak and party, the Ottoman Socialist Party, "attempted to reconcile socialism with Islam", although "their publications were also open to non-Muslim Ottoman citizens, reflecting a cosmopolitan outlook."

=== British India, 1910s-1940s ===
In South Asia, the Deobandi scholar and Indian independence activist Ubaidullah Sindhi travelled to Russia via Afghanistan in the 1910s. He remained in post-revolution Russia until 1923, where he studied socialism and engaged in discussions with communist revolutionaries. From Russia, he moved on to Turkey, where he developed his ideas on Islamic socialism, drawing parallels between Islam and communism in their emphasis on the fair distribution of wealth. Alongside Sindhi, during the 1920s and the 1930s, another lesser-known scholar, Hifzur Rahman Seoharwi, also found Islam and Marxism to be compatible, with multiple common ideas about social structure and economics.

=== Pakistan, 1940s-1960s ===
Islamic socialism was also essential to the ideology of Pakistan, as its founder, Muhammad Ali Jinnah, to a crowd in Chittagong on 26 March 1948 declared that "you are only voicing my sentiments and the sentiments of millions of Musalmans when you say that Pakistan should be based on sure foundations of social justice and Islamic socialism which emphasizes equality and brotherhood of man", while Pakistan's first Prime Minister, Liaquat Ali Khan, on 25 August 1949, said in the same vein that:

There are a number of 'isms' being talked about now-a-days, but we are convinced that for us there is only one 'ism', namely Islamic Socialism, which in a nutshell, means that every person in this land has equal rights to be provided with food, shelter, clothing, education and medical facilities. Countries which cannot ensure these for their people can never progress. The economic programme drawn up some 1,350 years back is still the best economic programme for us. In fact, whatever systems people may try out they all ultimately return to Islamic Socialism by whatever name they may choose to call it.

Jinnah's Muslim League, which was the first ruling party in Pakistan, contained a number of Islamic socialists, although they were relatively marginal in the party. Also influential in Pakistan was Ghulam Ahmed Perwez, an Islamic scholar who advocated Qur'anism and a focus on the study of modern sciences. Although he was criticised by more conservative scholars, he became aligned with Jinnah and Muhammad Iqbal, the former of whom appointed him as the editor of the magazine Talu-e-Islam, where he wrote and published articles espousing a socialistic interpretation of the Qur'an, arguing that "socialism best enforces Qur'anic dictums on property, justice and distribution of wealth", and advocating a progressive, non-theocratic government and the application of science and agrarian reform to further economic development. Perwez, as a part of his application of qur'anic thought to political ideology, stated that hell was a "... society in which men, dominated by its evil socio-economic system, struggle to accumulate wealth." During the presidency of Muhammad Ayub Khan in Pakistan in the 1960s, Hanif Ramay led a group of intellectuals in Lahore in developing Islamic socialist ideas, drawing on the thought of Perwez and Khalifa Abdul Hakim, along with Ba'athist thinkers such as Michel Aflaq. Ramay and his co-thinkers influenced Zulfikar Ali Bhutto when he founded the Pakistan Peoples Party with Jalaludin Abdur Rahim, and they were the primary ideological influence on the party's manifesto. Ramay outlined the priorities for the PPP's brand of Islamic socialism as including the elimination of feudalism and uncontrolled capitalism, greater state regulation of the economy, nationalisation of major banks, industries and schools, encouraging participatory management in factories and building democratic institutions. They contextualised these policies as a modern extension of principles of equality and justice contained in the Qur'an and practiced under the authority of Muhammad in Medina and Mecca. However, during Bhutto's time in power during the 1970s, he scaled back his reform programme and deepened Pakistan's ties with the conservative, oil-rich Gulf monarchies following the 1973 oil crisis, and purged the PPP's radical left and made concessions to Islamist parties in an effort to appease them. The party in 1967 adopted the slogan "Islam is our faith; democracy is our politics; socialism is our economy; all power to the people."

=== Iran, 1930s-1970s ===
The Iranian intellectual Muhammed Nakhshab is credited with the first synthesis between Shi'ism and European socialism. Nakhshab's movement was based on the tenet that Islam and socialism were not incompatible since both sought to accomplish social equality and justice. His theories had been expressed in his B.A. thesis on the laws of ethics. In 1943, Nakhshab founded the Movement of God-Worshipping Socialists, one of six original member organizations of the National Front. The organization was founded through the merger of two groupings, Nakhshab's circle of high school students at Dar al-Fanoun and Jalaleddin Ashtiyani's circle of about 25 students at the Faculty of Engineering at Tehran University. The organization was initially known as League of Patriotic Muslims. It combined religious sentiments, nationalism and socialist thoughts. After the 1953 coup against the National Front-led government of Mohammad Mosaddegh, Islamic socialism in Iran took a more radical turn, with the Organization of Struggle for the Emancipation of the Working Class, using Marxist ideas under the influence of Ali Shariati and engaging in armed struggle against the government of the Shah of Iran, culminating in its participation in the Iranian Revolution which overthrew the Shah in 1979. However, the movement was purged during the Cultural Revolution in Iran.

=== Indonesia, 1940s ===
In Indonesia, former Communist Tan Malaka was an influential Islamic socialist thinker during the country's independence struggle, arguing that communism and Islam were compatible and that they should form the foundation for Indonesia's national revolution, and believing that Islam could be used to unify the working classes across the Muslim world. Although Malaka died in 1949, the same year that Indonesia achieved independence, the nation's first president Sukarno drew upon his ideas: he espoused ideological concepts which incorporated both religious and socialist ideas, such as Pancasila and Nasakom.

=== Algeria, 1950s ===
See National Liberation Front (Algeria), Algerian nationalism

=== Afghanistan, 1960s-1990s ===
Although it was Marxist, the People's Democratic Party of Afghanistan (which took power after the country's Saur Revolution) started utilising rhetoric stressing similarities between socialism and Islam after its reforms provoked opposition from religious conservatives and landowners. Nur Muhammad Taraki's, the first president of the Democratic Republic of Afghanistan, most acute dilemma was establishing a party line on Islam, balancing respect for its principles with Marxist–Leninist ideals. Despite leading Ramadan prayers and making conciliatory speeches, Article I of a secret PDPA constitution affirmed the party's belief in Marxist–Leninist ideals. Taraki aimed to reconcile this with Islam by proposing a "progressive, modern, pure Islam," free from "bad traditions, superstition and erroneous belief." This indicated Taraki's effort to merge Islamic values with socialist principles, reflecting a form of Islamic socialism, although it faced backlash from the Islamic clergy and the rural population.

=== Somalia, 1970s ===
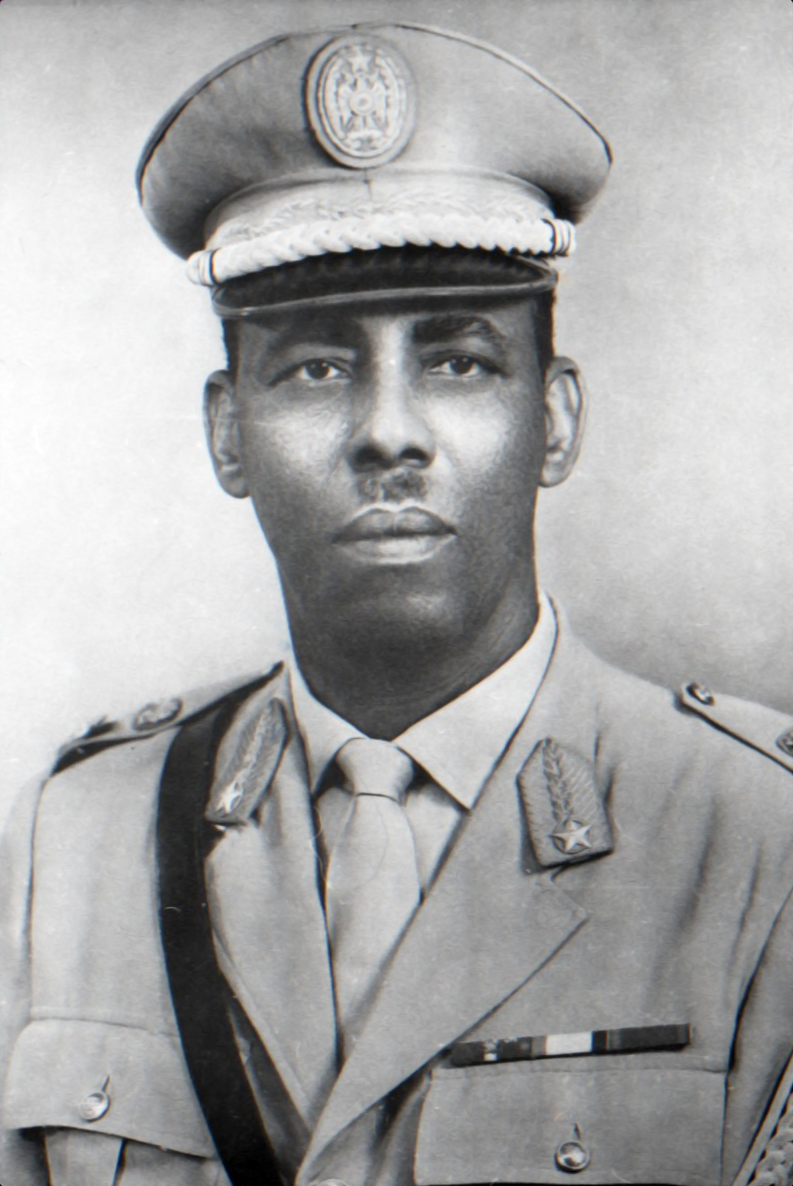
Siad Barre c. 1969, the longest serving head of state of the Somali Democratic Republic.

The Somali Revolutionary Socialist Party (SRSP) was created by the military regime of Siad Barre in the Somali Democratic Republic under Soviet guidance in 1976 as an attempt to reconcile the official state ideology with the official state religion by adapting Marxist–Leninist precepts to local circumstances. Emphasis was placed on the Muslim principles of social progress, equality and justice, which the government argued formed the core of scientific socialism and its own accent on self-sufficiency, public participation and popular control as well as direct ownership of the means of production. As part of Barre's socialist policies, major industries and farms were nationalized, including banks, insurance companies and oil distribution farms. While the SRSP encouraged private investment on a limited scale, the administration still considered itself to be essentially socialist.

== Ideas and concepts ==
As a syncretic ideology, "Islamic socialism" refers to the reconciliation of socialism with Islam. As such, it is a diverse ideology, with many internal tendencies. Some examples of influential Islamic socialist thinkers and leaders include Siad Barre, Haji Misbach, Ali Shariati, Yasser Arafat, Abdullah al-Alayli, Sukarno, Jalal Al-e Ahmad, Mohammed Iqbal, Agus Salim, Jamal ad-Din Asad-Abadi, Musa al-Sadr, Malcolm X, Mirsaid Sultan-Galiev, Muammar Gaddafi, Modibo Keïta, Malala Yousafzai, Ahmed Ben Bella, Messali Hadj, Maulana Bhashani, and Mahmud Shaltut. These authors all had different attitudes towards ideological issues—including (but not limited to) proletarian internationalism; the implementation of Islamic Sharia; decolonisation, postcolonialism, and nationalism; collective ownership of the means of production; world revolution and jihad; the role of the state; Islamic revival, the potential for pan-Islamic cooperation and the revival of the Caliphate; the role of the Ulema; and feminism (Islamic or otherwise). Many thinkers considered these and other ideological questions not just as matters of socio-political importance, but as explicitly spiritual matters as well, as might be expected for a religious ideology.

They draw inspiration from the first Islamic state, which was established by Muhammad in the city of Medina. This blend of Islam with socialist principles was popularized as a viable form of anti-imperialism that could be widely accepted in the Muslim world. This is especially seen in the works of Egyptian writer Salama Moussa, who wrote extensively about socialism and about Egyptian nationalism against British rule.

Muslim socialist leaders believe in the derivation of political legitimacy from the public, and wish to implement a government based on social welfare and the concept of zakat. In practice, this has been seen through guaranteed incomes, pensions, and welfare. These practical applications of the idea of Islamic socialism have a history going back to Muhammad and the first few caliphates, and have persisted through to modern Islamic political parties founded in the 1970s.

Islamic socialists often use the Qur'an to defend their positions. For instance, in Pakistan, the verses "Man is entitled only to what is due to his effort" and "the land belongs to God" have been used to argue in favor of Islamic socialism, and as an argument against the accretion of wealth through the manipulation of capital. Anti-Capitalist Muslims, a political organization in Turkey, openly advocates socialism and frequently challenges right-wing Muslims to read the Qur'an and "try to disprove the fact that it is leftist".

=== Zakat ===
One of the Five Pillars of Islam, zakāt is the practice of almsgiving based on accumulated wealth (approximately 2.5% of all financial assets owned over the course of one lunar year). Unlike ṣadaqah, charity, it is obligatory for all financially able Muslim adults and is considered to be an act of piety through which one expresses concern for the well-being of fellow Muslims as well as preserving social harmony between the wealthy and the poor. The zakat promotes a more equitable redistribution of wealth and fosters a sense of solidarity amongst members of the ummah (meaning "community").

Zakat is meant to discourage the hoarding of capital and stimulate investment. Because the individual must pay zakat on the net wealth, wealthy Muslims are compelled to invest in profitable ventures, or otherwise see their wealth slowly erode. Furthermore, means of production such as equipment, factories and tools are exempt from zakat, which further provides the incentive to invest wealth in productive businesses. Personal assets such as clothing, household furniture and one residence are not considered zakatable assets.

Historically, Abul A'la Maududi championed the concept of Zakat. According to Maududi, Zakat should be primarily in the form of taxation from a position called the exchequer, who would manage the Zakat collected and make sure that it was distributed correctly. Should someone die with no family to pass on their wealth, then this wealth would be given to the exchequer for management.

=== Welfare state ===
The concepts of welfare and pension were introduced in early Islamic law as forms of zakat, or charity. Zakat is one of the Five Pillars of Islam, and was implemented under the Rashidun Caliphate in the 7th century. This practice continued well into the Abbasid era of the caliphate. The taxes (including zakat and jizya) collected in the treasury of an Islamic government were used to provide income for the needy, including the poor, elderly, orphans, widows and the disabled. According to the Islamic jurist Al-Ghazali (1058–1111), the government was also expected to stockpile food supplies in every region in case a disaster or famine occurred.

During the Rashidun Caliphate, various welfare programs were introduced by Caliph Umar. Under his rule, equality was extended to all citizens, even to the caliph himself, as Umar believed that "no one, no matter how important, should live in a way that would distinguish him from the rest of the people." Umar himself lived "a simple life and detached himself from any of the worldly luxuries," like how he often wore "worn-out shoes and was usually clad in patched-up garments," or how he would sleep "on the bare floor of the mosque." Limitations on wealth were also set for governors and officials, who would often be "dismissed if they showed any outward signs of pride or wealth which might distinguish them from the people." This was an early attempt at erasing "class distinctions which might inevitably lead to conflict." Umar also made sure that the public treasury was not wasted on "unnecessary luxuries" as he believed that "the money would be better spent if it went towards the welfare of the people rather than towards lifeless bricks."

Umar's innovative welfare reforms during the Rashidun Caliphate included the introduction of social security. This included unemployment insurance, which did not appear in the Western world until the 19th century. In the Rashidun Caliphate, whenever citizens were injured or lost their ability to work, it became the state's responsibility to make sure that their minimum needs were met, with the unemployed and their families receiving an allowance from the public treasury. Retirement pensions were provided to elderly people, who had retired and could "count on receiving a stipend from the public treasury." Babies who were abandoned were also taken care of, with one hundred dirhams spent annually on each orphan's development. Umar also introduced the concept of public trusteeship and public ownership when he implemented the Waqf, or charitable trust, system, which transferred "wealth from the individual or the few to a social collective ownership," in order to provide "services to the community at large." For example, Umar bought land from the Banu Harithah and converted it into a charitable trust, which meant that "profit and produce from the land went towards benefiting the poor, slaves, and travelers."

During the great famine of 18 AH (638 CE), Umar introduced further reforms such as the introduction of food rationing using coupons, which were given to those in need and could be exchanged for wheat and flour. Another innovative concept that was introduced was that of a poverty threshold, with efforts made to ensure a minimum standard of living. This made sure that no citizen across the empire would suffer from hunger. In order to determine the poverty line, Umar ordered an experiment to test how many seers of flour would be required to feed a person for a month. He found that 25 seers of flour could feed 30 people and so he concluded that 50 seers of flour would be sufficient to feed a person for a month. As a result, he ordered that the poor each receive a food ration of 50 seers of flour per month. In addition, the poor and disabled were guaranteed cash stipends. However, in order to avoid some citizens taking advantage of government services "begging and laziness were not tolerated" and "those who received government benefits were expected to be contributing members in the community."

Further reforms later took place under the Umayyad Caliphate. Registered soldiers who were disabled in service received an invalidity pension, while similar provisions were made for disabled people and poor in general. Caliph Al-Walid I assigned payments and services to the needy, which included money for the poor, guides for the blind, servants for the crippled, and pensions for all disabled people so that they would never need to beg. The caliphs Al-Walid II and Umar ibn Abdul-Aziz supplied money and clothes to the blind and crippled, as well as servants for the latter. This continued with the Abbasid caliph Al-Mahdi. Tahir ibn Husayn, governor of the Khurasan province of the Abbasid Caliphate, stated in a letter to his son that pensions from the treasury should be provided to the blind, to look after the poor and destitute in general, to make sure not to overlook victims of oppression who are unable to complain and are ignorant of how to claim their rights and that pensions should be assigned to victims of calamities and the widows and orphans they leave behind. The "ideal city" described by the Islamic philosophers, Al-Farabi and Avicenna, also assigns funds to disabled people.

When communities were stricken by famine, rulers would often support them through measures such as the remission of taxes, importation of food and charitable payments, ensuring that everyone had enough to eat. However, private charity through the trust institution often played a greater role in the alleviation of famines than government measures did. From the 9th century, funds from the treasury were also used towards the charitable trusts for the purpose of building and supporting public institutions, often Madrassah educational institutions and Bimaristan hospitals.

=== Guaranteed minimum income ===
A guaranteed minimum income is a system of social welfare provision that guarantees that all citizens or families have an income sufficient to live on, provided they meet certain conditions. Eligibility is typically determined by citizenship, a means test and either availability for the labour market or a willingness to perform community services. The primary goal of a guaranteed minimum income is to combat poverty. If citizenship is the only requirement, the system turns into a universal basic income. The first Muslim Caliph Abu Bakr introduced a guaranteed minimum standard of income, granting each man, woman and child ten dirhams annually—this was later increased to twenty dirhams. Some, but not all Islamic socialists advocate the renewal and expansion of this policy.

== Islamic socialist ideologies ==
=== Gaddafism ===
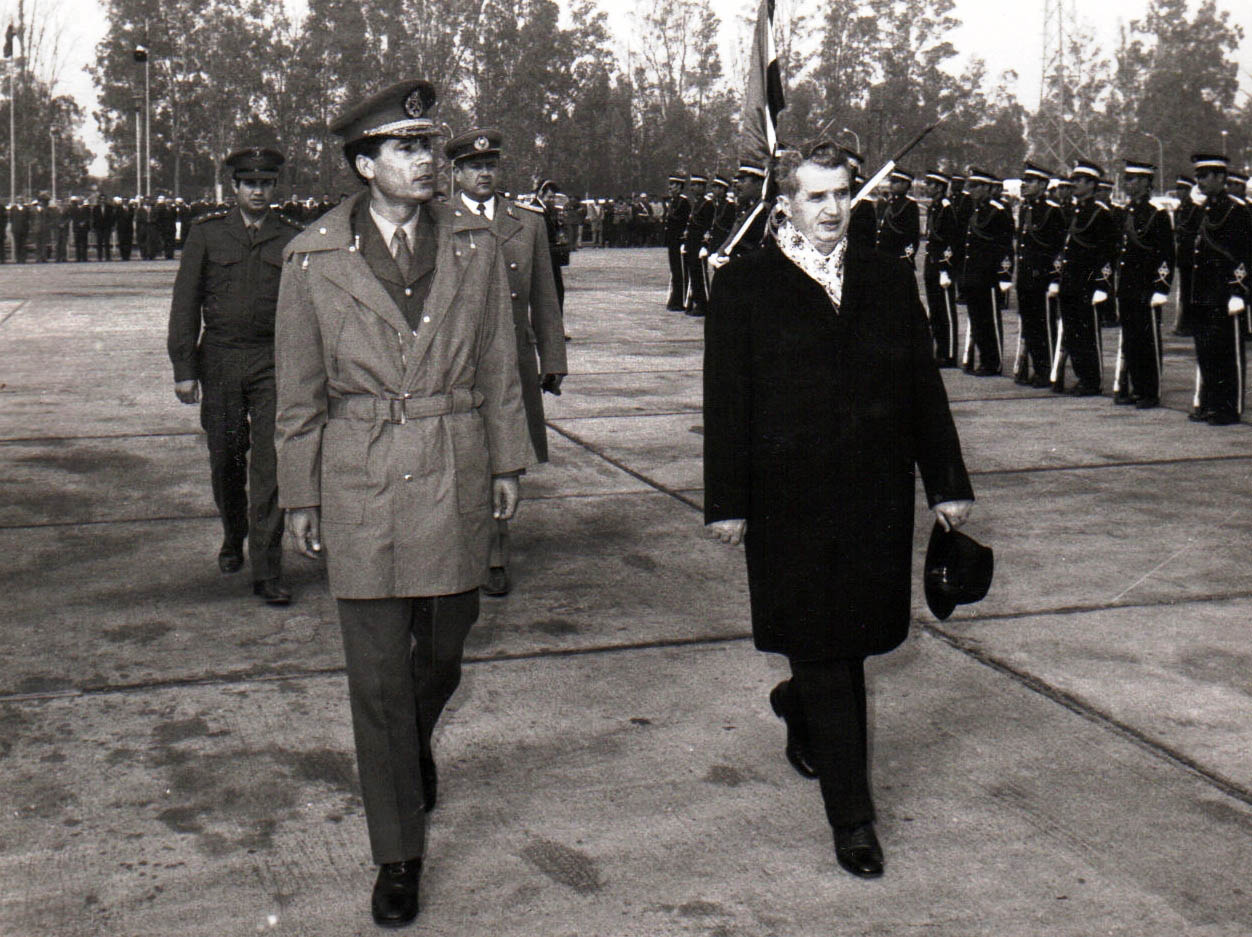
Gaddafi with Romanian communist leader Nicolae Ceaușescu in Bucharest, Romania, 1974.

Muammar Gaddafi outlined his version of Islamic socialism in The Green Book, which was published in three parts (1975, 1977, 1978). The Green Book was heavily influenced by the pan-Arab, Egyptian leader Gamal Abdel Nasser and served as the basis for the Islamic Legion.

The Green Book rejects modern liberal democracy based on electing representatives as well as capitalism and instead it proposes a type of direct democracy overseen by the General People's Committee which allows direct political participation for all adult citizens. The book states that "freedom of expression is the right of every natural person, even if a person chooses to behave irrationally, to express his or her insanity". The Green Book states that freedom of speech is based upon public ownership of book publishers, newspapers, television and radio stations on the grounds that private ownership would be undemocratic.

A paragraph in the book about abolishing money is similar to a paragraph in Frederick Engels' "Principles of Communism", Gaddafi wrote: "The final step is when the new socialist society reaches the stage where profit and money disappear. "It is through transforming society into a fully productive society, and through reaching in production a level where the material needs of the members of society are satisfied. On that final stage, profit will automatically disappear and there will be no need for money".

In practical terms, although Gaddafi opposed Islamist movements, he pursued socially conservative policies such as banning the sale and consumption of alcohol, closing nightclubs and suppressing Marxist activity in universities and colleges.

According to Raymond D. Gastil, the RUF was influenced by Gaddafi's Islamic Socialist philosophy.

=== Somali "Scientific Socialism" ===
In 1969, following the assassination of President Abdirashid Ali Shermarke, Siad Barre led a bloodless military coup that overthrew Somalia's civilian government. After assuming power, Barre introduced the state ideology of Scientific Socialism, which sought to combine Marxist–Leninist economic principles and dialectical materialism with Sunni Islamic values, empirical science, and Somali cultural traditions.

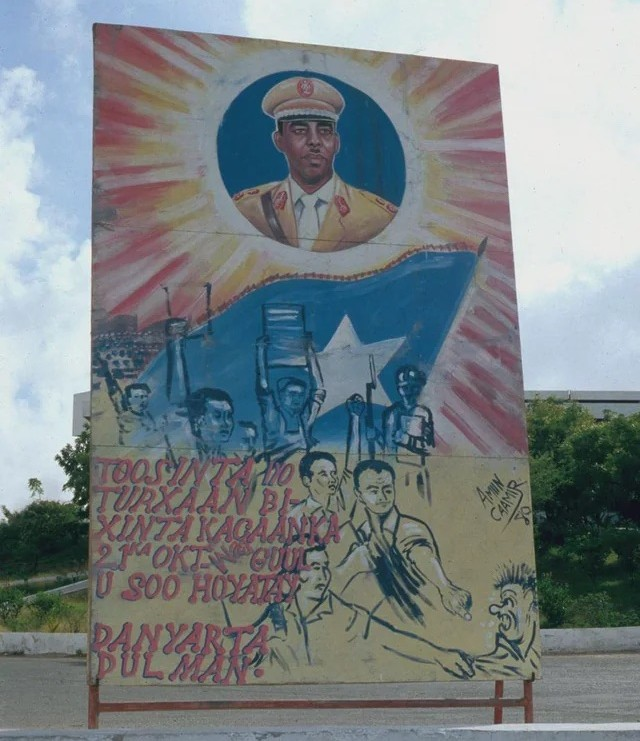
Mural in Somalia, depicting Siad Barres bloodless coup of the Government.

"As far as socialism is concerned, it is not a heavenly message like Islam but a mere system for regulating the relations between man and his utilization of the means of production in this world. If we decide to regulate our national wealth, it is not against the essence of Islam." - Siad Barre in the response to the question which asked if Socialism and Islam can work.

While Scientific Socialism helped boost Somali education, restricted/limited Tribalism, and brought stability to the country, Siad Barre eventually abandoned it once the Soviet Union switched priorities from Somalia to Ethiopia in the Ogaden war. Instead replacing Socialism with Capitalism, and aligning Somalia with the U.S.

=== Anatolian Socialism (Kuva-yi Seyyare) ===
Anatolian Islamic Socialism was initially supported by Çerkes Ethem who was an Ottoman militia leader of Circassian origin who initially gained fame for fighting and gaining victories against the Allied powers invading Anatolia in the aftermath of World War I and afterwards during the Turkish War of Independence.

The Kuvâ-yi Seyyâre was established as a force of Circassian and Abkhazian volunteers led by Çerkes Ethem. The group saw themselves as a police force to fight against those who cause disturbance to the greater good of Anatolia. In time, as Ethem's Islamic Socialist views grew more prevalent, it distanced itself from Kemal Atatürk's Turkish National movement and eventually opposed it.

=== Islamic Marxism ===
Islamic Marxism attempts to apply Marxist economic, political, and social teachings within an Islamic framework. Traditional forms of Marxism are anti-religious and support atheism, which has led many Muslims to reject Marxism. However, the affinity between Marxist and Islamic ideals of social justice has led some Muslims to embrace their own forms of Marxism since the 1940s. Islamic Marxists believe that Islam meets the needs of society and can accommodate or guide the social changes Marxism hopes to accomplish. Islamic Marxists are also dismissive of traditional Marxist views on materialism and religion.

As a term, it has been used to describe Ali Shariati (in Shariati and Marx: A Critique of an "Islamic" Critique of Marxism by Asef Bayat). It is also sometimes used in discussions of the 1979 Iranian Revolution.

=== Wäisi movement ===
Founded by Bahawetdin Wäisev, the Wäisi movement was a religious, social, and political movement that took place in late-nineteenth and early-twentieth-century Tatarstan and other Tatar-populated parts of Russia. Wäisi doctrines promoted disobedience to civil law and authority in favor of following the Qur'an and Sharia. Supporters of the movement evaded military service and refused to pay imposition or carry a Russian passport. The movement also incorporated elements of class struggle and nationalism. The Wäisi movement united Tatar farmers, craftsmen and petty bourgeoisie and enjoyed widespread popularity across the region.

Despite going underground in the aftermath of Bahawetdin Wäisev's arrest in 1884, the movement continued to maintain a strong following. Bahawetdin Wäisev's son Ğaynan Wäisev led the movement after his death in 1893. An estimated 100 members were arrested and exiled in 1897 after encouraging people not to participate in the population census. The Wäisi movement increased in size after the first Russian revolution in 1905–1907, and by 1908, there were nearly 15,000 followers in the Kazan Governorate, Orenburg and other guberniyas in Central Asia. Wäisi followers supported the Soviet government in the aftermath of the October Revolution of 1917 and organized a regiment in the Red Army during the Russian Civil War. Members of the movement distanced themselves from the Russian Bolsheviks and founded the autonomous commune of Yaña Bolğar in Christopol during the 1920s, but were persecuted and disbanded during the Great Purge of the 1930s.

== Islamic socialist or leftist organisations ==
=== Sunni socialist groups ===
==== Current ====
- (Algeria) National Liberation Front
- Popular Front for the Liberation of Libya
- (Egypt) Egyptian Arab Socialist Party
- (Egypt) Egyptian Islamic Labour Party
- (Egypt) Social Justice Party
- (Egypt) Umma Party
- Young Egypt Party
- (Malaysia) National Trust Party
- (Sudan) Islamic Socialist Party
- (Turkey) Anti-Capitalist Muslims
- (Yemen) Yemeni Socialist Party

==== Historical ====
- (Democratic Republic of Afghanistan) Democratic Homeland Party
- (Bangladesh) National Awami Party (Bhashani)
- (Indonesia) Sarekat Islam
- (Indonesia) Nasakom
- (Pakistan) All-India Muslim League
- (Pakistan) Muslim League (1947–1958)
- (Russia) Muslim Socialist Committee of Kazan
- National Liberation Front of Chad
- (Somalia) Somali Revolutionary Socialist Party
- (Syria) Socialist Cooperation Party
- (Turkey) Kuva-yi Seyyare
- (Turkey) Green Army Organisation
- (Uzbekistan) Young Bukharians
- (Uzbekistan) Young Khivans

=== Shia socialist groups ===
==== Current ====
- People's Mojahedin Organization of Iran
- Mojahedin of the Islamic Revolution of Iran Organization
- (Iran) Movement of Militant Muslims
- (Pakistan) Majlis Wahdat-e-Muslimeen
- Pakistan People's Party

==== Historical ====
- (Azerbaijan) Muslim Social Democratic Party
- (Iran) Islamic Nations Party
- Liberation Movement of People of Iran
- (Iran) Movement of God-Worshipping Socialists
- (Iran) Office for the Cooperation of the People with the President
- (Iran) Party of the Iranian People

== See also ==
- Arab socialism
- Capitalism and Islam
- Christian communism
- Christian socialism
- Islamic economics
- Islamic feminism
- Islamo-leftism
- Jewish left
- Progressive Muslim vote
- Qarmatians
- Religious socialism
- Zanj Rebellion
