= Prosecutor's office of the Autonomous Republic of Crimea =

Government body of the Autonomous Republic of Crimea, Ukraine

Prosecutor’s office of the Autonomous Republic of Crimea (Prosecutor’s Office of the AR Crimea)

Regional prosecutor’s office overview
- Formed: 1 December 1991
- Jurisdiction: Autonomous Republic of Crimea and Sevastopol
- Headquarters: Simferopol, Ukraine 13/15 Riznytska Str. Kyiv 01011 (temporary); 50°26′08″N 30°32′31″E
- Motto: "Закон. Честь. Гідність." ("Law. Honour. Dignity.")
- Regional prosecutor’s office executive: Ihor Panochovnyi (since 22 October 2019), Prosecutor of the Autonomous Republic of Crimea
- Website: ark.gp.gov.ua/ua/index.html

The Prosecutor's Office of the Autonomous Republic of Crimea and the City of Sevastopol (Ukrainian: Прокуратура Автономної Республіки Крим та міста Севастополя) is a Ukrainian state government body that is part of the Autonomous Republic of Crimea. From 2014 to 2021, it sent over 300 indictments to court and, as at December 2025, had sent 837 indictments over the previous 5 years. According to the Acting Prosecutor General's decree No33 dated 12 June 2014, the Prosecutor's office of the Autonomous Republic of Crimea was temporarily relocated to Kyiv.

== History ==
=== Russian Empire ===
During the rule of Catherine II, the government was reorganized with appointments for regional prosecutors and arbitrators. The first prosecutor in the Crimean peninsula was Court Counsellor Dmytro Lesli, dated to be in 1785. He remained in the position until 13 December 1788, when Oleksandr Taranov-Belozerov succeeded him. He remained in post for 15 years before being replaced by Mykhailo Tarnavskii on 30 June 1803 with the establishment of the Taurida Governorate.

At the time, the prosecutor supervised over the legality of court judgements in criminal cases and also the application of other coercive measures related to the restraint of individual liberty. Records from the Crimean Public Records Office included notes about several prosecutors, including Fabr, Semen Mayer, Stanislav Borovsky and Oleksandr Glukhov. In April 1869, the position of prosecutor in the governorate was abolished according to the 1864 judicial reforms, and its functions replaced by the prosecutor of the Simferopol District Court.

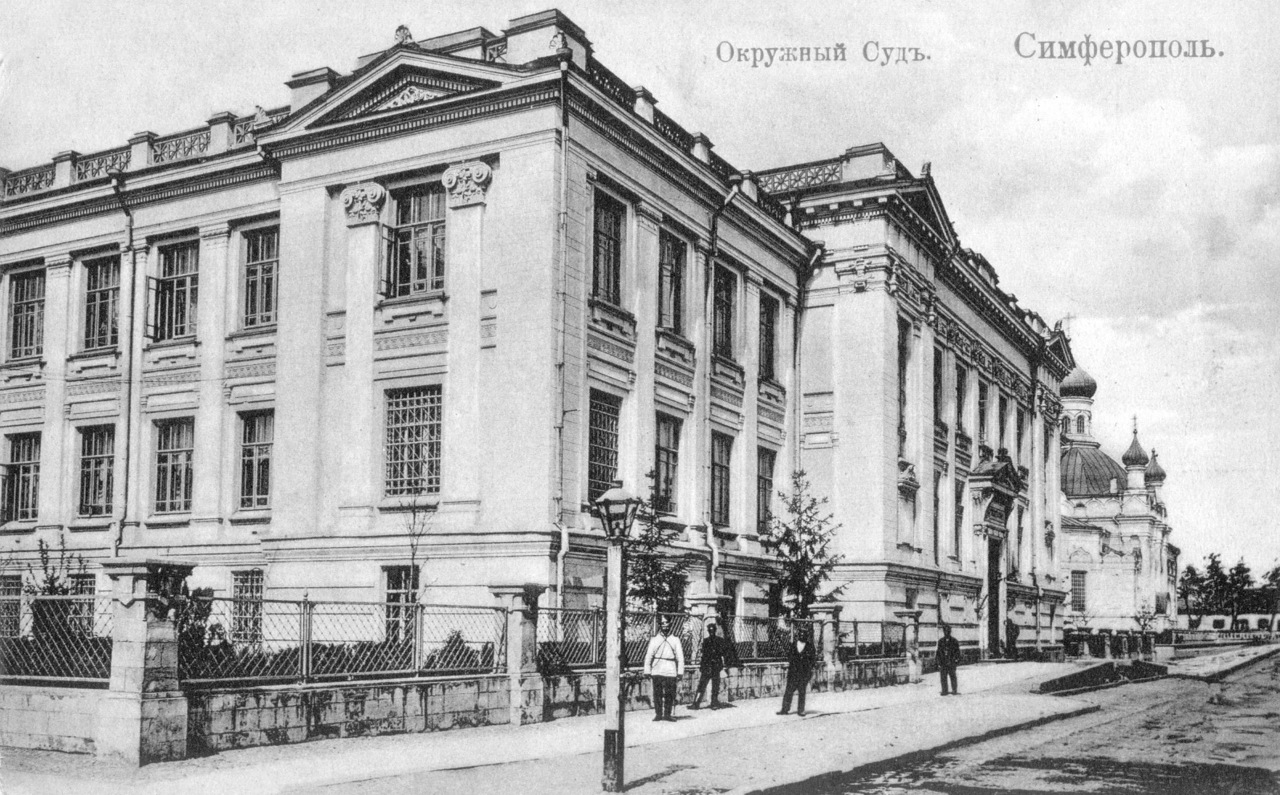
The District Court of Simferopol

The district court is made up of two houses, and was established on 22 April 1869 based on a decree from the Governing Senate on 5 July 1868. According to the decree, the district prosecutor was guided by the Ministry of Justice and the chief prosecutor from Odesa. The district court consisted of a Head, several Deputies and Members, and also the Prosecutor, the Detective, and the Notary. The Prosecutor should act as the accusatorial body of the State and also chiefly responsible for supervision.

The Public Record Office noted several names who acted in the position of prosecutor in the district court, including: Boris Vitte, Mykola Domchynskii, Novytskii, Felix Zivert, Umanskii. There are also evidences that under the supervision of the Prosecutor Felix Zivert there were nearly eleven prosecution attorneys.

=== Soviet Union ===
In 1922, Soviet Crimea established the new local justice departments, and the new prosecution supervision body began its work on 16 September 1922, which consisted of a Prosecutor, two deputies (one for criminal and one for civil), and the department for public prosecution.

In 1923, the Main Governing Body of Russia began implementation of the 1922 Soviet Russian Criminal Code, which implied integration of the prosecutor's office into the Ministry of Justice. The State Prosecution Service should perform the following functions: supervision over observance of laws by the authorities, public organizations and individuals; direct supervision over the bodies carrying out detective operations, inquiries and pre-trial investigation; supporting the prosecution in courts on behalf of the State.

During this period İsmail Firdevs was the Prosecutor of the Autonomous Soviet Socialist Republic of Crimea and under his control, there were State Prosecution Service, two deputies, the prosecutors of regional courts, the prosecutors of Sevastopol and Simferopol regional courts. Historical sourced named several other prosecutors during this time, such as Reshid Nagayev, Osman Berikov, Plinokos, Sofu, and Memeth Emir-Saliev.

In 1936, the prosecutor became under the jurisdiction of the Procurator General of the Soviet Union. In February 1941, Mykhailo Zolotov was the head of the Prosecution Service of Criman ASSR. When German troops occupied Crimea in November 1941, the prosecution service temporarily stopped until 4 October 1943, when it restarted in Krasnodar.

On 3 January 1942, Mykola Chekalov was the prosecutor of Crimea, and he returned to Simferopol in 1944 after its liberation. On 22 April 1944, twenty-one of former participants of war began their work at the prosecutor's office. Very soon the prosecution started to perform its main duty – to protect the Socialist law and public property. At that time the prosecution consisted of six divisions: investigation, сriminal-judicial, investigation of extremely grave crimes, general supervision, supervision under the police. Supervision under the places of detention was performed by the prosecutor's assistant. The secret division was detached into the special sector.

Under the direct management of the prosecutor of the ASSR of Crimea there were 5 city prosecutor's offices, 27 regional prosecutions, and 9 regional prosecutions of cities – Kerch, Sevastopol and Simferopol.

In June 1945, Crimea's status went from an ASSR to an Oblast, and the name of the prosecution office also renamed accordingly. In 1947, a new position was established to deal with crimes against minors.

In 1978, the Division of Investigation began its work. In 1980, the Regional Prosecution Board was established. The period between 1950s and 1980s was rather stable, and there were only three prosecutors during this time: Mykola Khlamov for 8 years (September 1949 – May 1957), Iliya Konoplev for 7 years (May 1957 – July 1964), and for Mykola Korneev for 20 years (July 1964 – July 1984).

During the 1990s, economic crimes increased as a result of the 1989–1991 Soviet economic crisis, leading to significant reforms in the prosecutor's office. The situation in Crimea was problematic: almost daily there were shots and people died, and a lot of powerful criminal groups appeared, the largest of which had 50-60 members.

=== Ukraine ===
This criminal situation greatly improved when Volodymyr Shuba became the prosecutor of Crimea in 1996. From early 1997, the number of felonies greatly decreased.

From 2011 to 2014, Vyacheslav Pavlov was the prosecutor of Crimea until March 2014 when Russian troops entered the peninsula, leading to Russian annexation a month later. Since then, the peninsula has been under Russian occupation and the prosecutor's office has relocated to Kyiv.

From 29 August 2014 to 19 August 2016, Vasyl Sinchuk was prosecutor of AR Crimea. Afterwards, the Prosecutor General of Ukraine appointed Gyunduz Mamedov to this position. In September 2016, the prosecutor's office was reformed, with its staff increased and some departments relocated to Kherson.

Since Russian occupation, the prosecutor's office has increased its efforts to renewal of justice and prosecution of those responsible for occupation and human rights violations of Ukrainian citizens living in Crimea. It also focuses on investigations of crimes against Ukrainian National Security and war crimes.

On 22 October 2019, the Prosecutor General of Ukraine appointed Ihor Panochovnyi to the position of prosecutor.

== Structure ==
- Prosecutor of the Autonomous Republic of Crimea;
- First Deputy Prosecutor of the Autonomous Republic of Crimea;
- Deputy Prosecutor of the Autonomous Republic of Crimea;
- Department of Personnel;
- Department of organizational and legal support, statistics and Single record of investigations support;
- Division for Supervision over Criminal proceedings:
- Department for Supervision over Compliance with Legislation in criminal proceedings and Anti-Corruption Legislation;
- Department of Supervision over Compliance with Legislation on Security Service, State Fiscal Service and State Border Guard Service of Ukraine;
- Department of Supervision over the Procedural Activities of Preliminary Investigation Bodies and Criminal Court Proceedings:
- Department of investigations;
- Department of Procedural Supervision over Criminal Proceedings and State Accusation Support;
- Department of Representation of the State and Individual interests in the Court;
- Prosecution Attorneys;
- Division for Documental Support (acting as a Department);
- Department of Finance and Accounting;
- Department of organizational and technical support;
- Senior Specialists of the State Secrets Defence;
- Senior Specialists of the Informational and Technical Support;
- Press-secretary (acting as a Senior Specialist).

== List of Prosecutors ==
=== Autonomous Soviet Socialist Republic of Crimea ===
- M. I. Poretskiy (1921–1922)
- İsmail Firdevs (1922–1923)
- Osman Saidovich Diveyev (1923–1924)
- Ilya Sergiyovych Bazhyn (1926–1927)
- Grigoriy Pavlovych Plinkonos (1930–1932)
- Memeth Emir-Saliev (1932–1934)
- Kostyantyn Mykolaiovych Monatov (1936–1938)
- Oleksiy Pavlovych Kartushenko (1939–1941)
- Mykhailo Fedorovych Zolotov (1941)
- Feodosii Grygorovych Donchenko (1941–1942)
- Mykola Illich Chekalov (1942 – 1945)

=== Crimean Oblast ===
- Mykola Illich Chekalov (1945–1947)
- Serhiy Ivanovych Neronov (1947–1949)
- Mykola Mykolaiovych Khlamov (1949–1957)
- Ilya Ivanovych Konoplev (1957–1964)
- Mykola Ivanovych Korneyev (1964–1984)
- Zinovii Tesak (1984–1991)

=== Autonomous Republic of Crimea ===
- Zinovii Tesak (1991–1992)
- Leonid Izosimov (1992–1993)
- Valentyn Kuptsov (1993–1996)
- Volodymyr Shuba (1996–2000)
- Oleksandr Dobrorez (2000–2003)
- Volodymyr Haltsov (2003–2005)
- Viktor Shemchuk (2005–2007)
- Volodymyr Galtsov (2007)
- Viktor Shemchuk (2007)
- Oleksii Ugriumov (2007–2008)
- Volodymyr Boyko (2008–2010)
- Stepan Molytskii (2010–2011)
- Vyacheslav Pavlov (2011–2014)
- Vasyl Synchuk (2014–2016)
- Gyunduz Mamedov (2016–2019)
- Ihor Panochovnyi (2019-)

== Gallery ==
=== Archival Documents ===
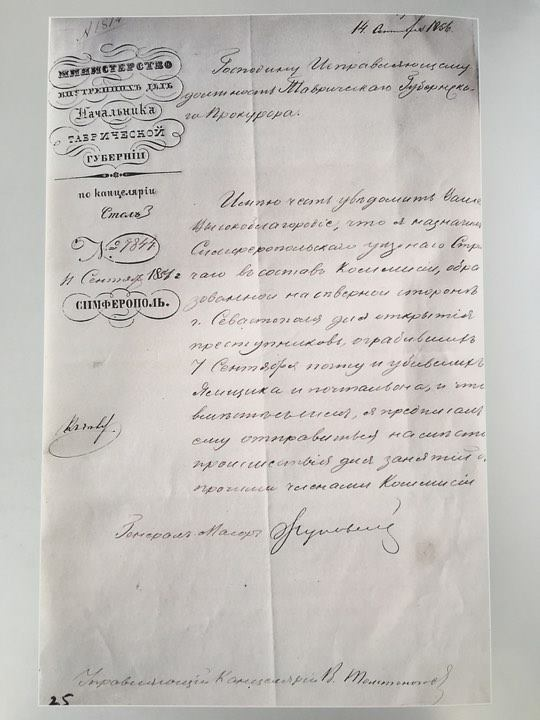

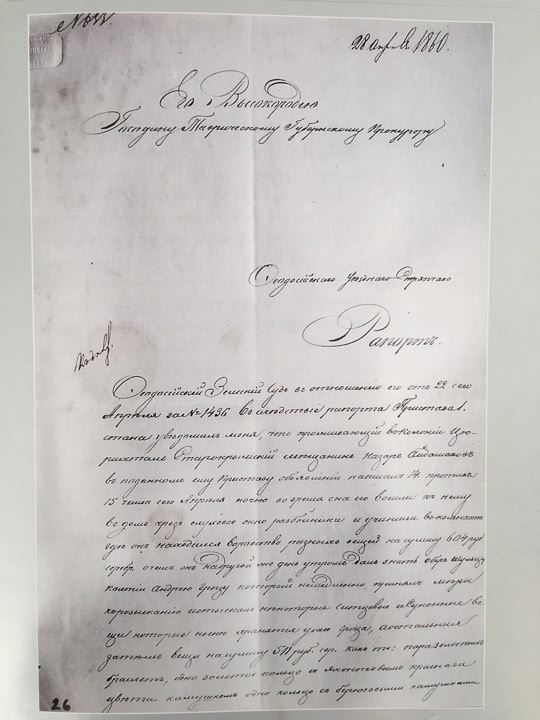

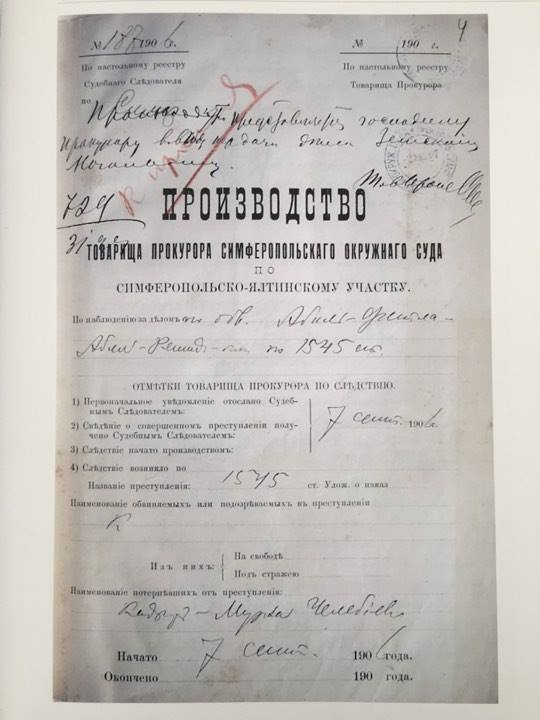

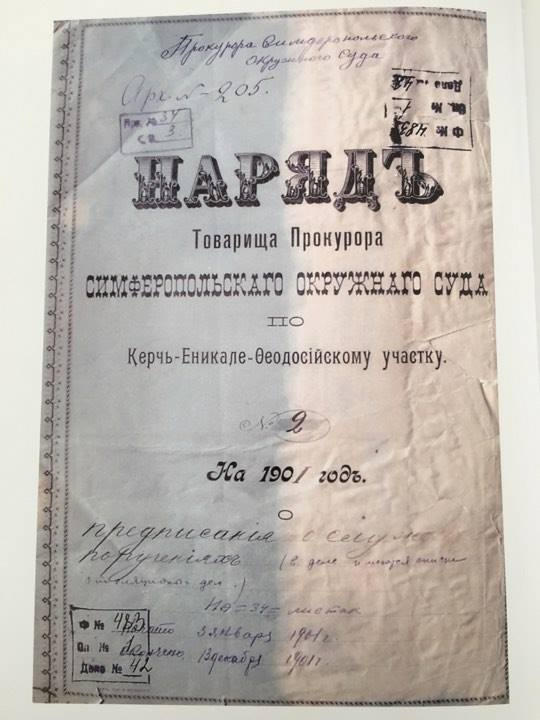

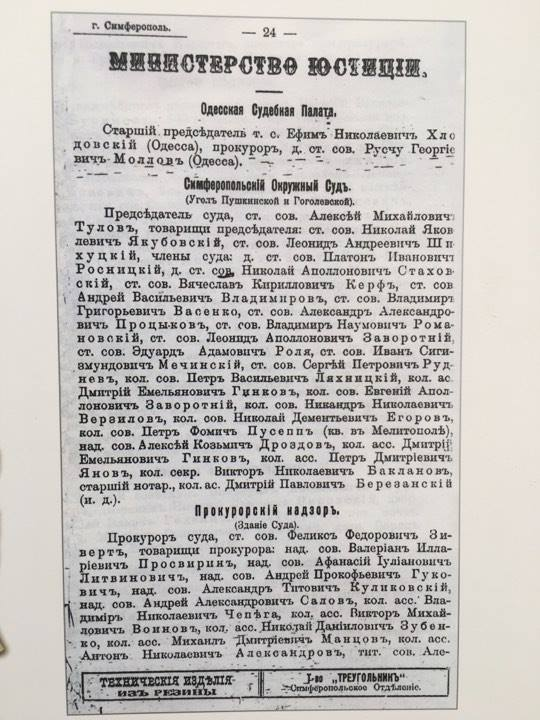

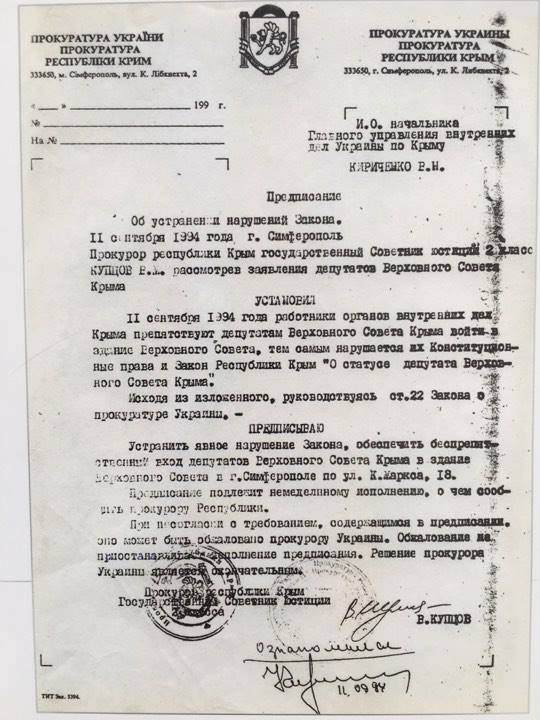

=== Simferopol office ===
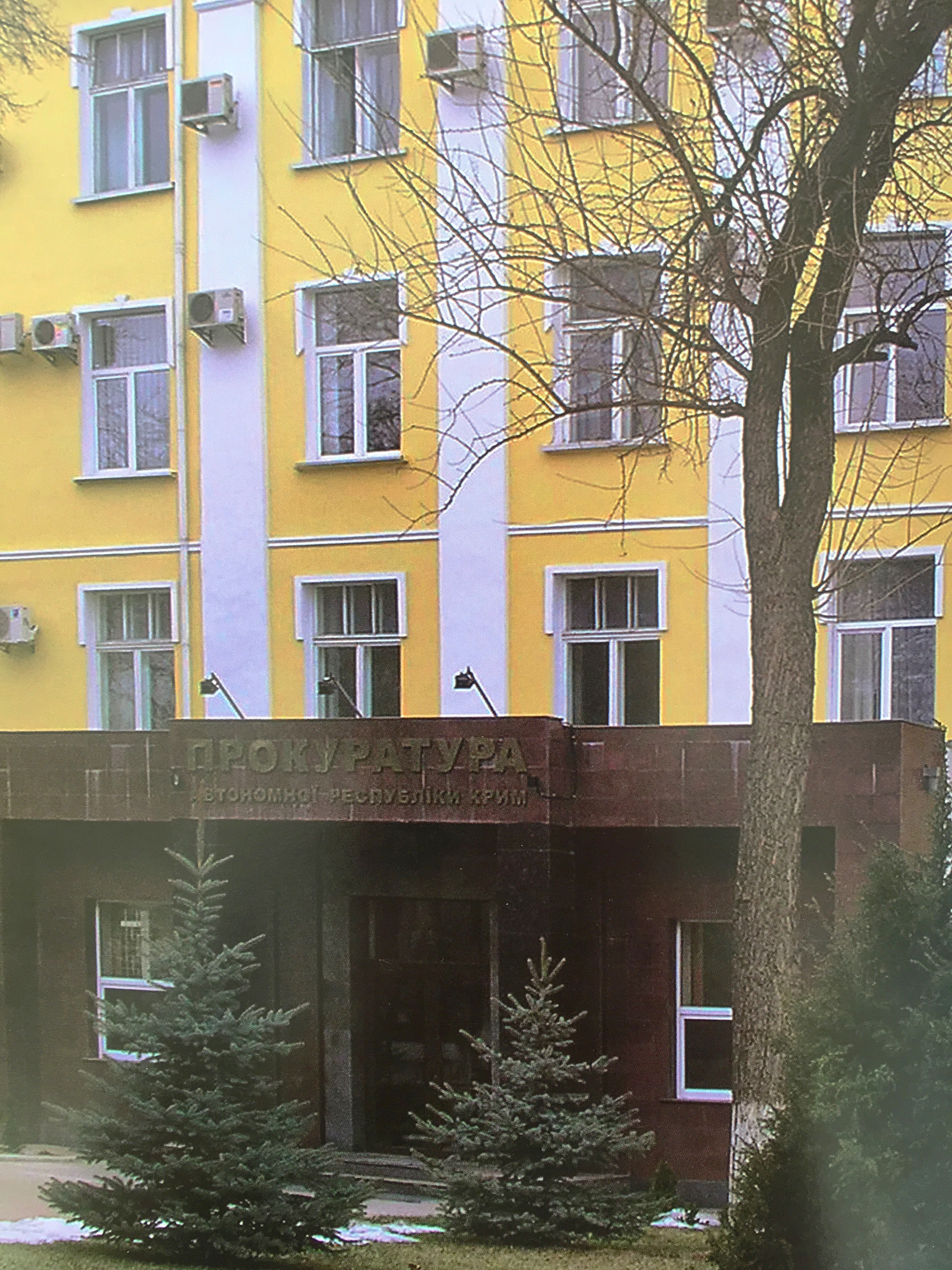
Prosecutor's office of the AR of Crimea (Simferopol)

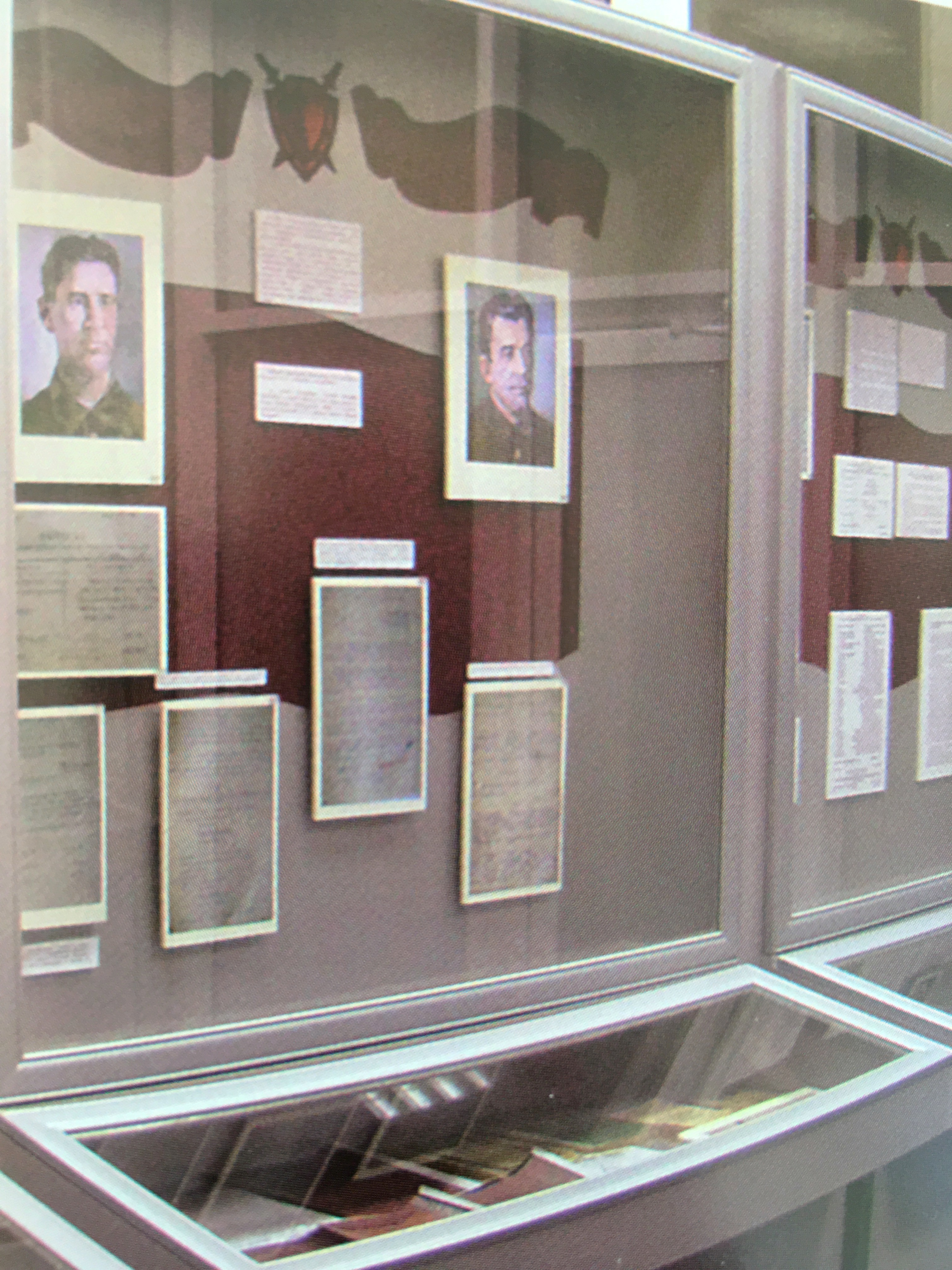
The exhibits of the Historical Museum of Crimean Prosecutor's office

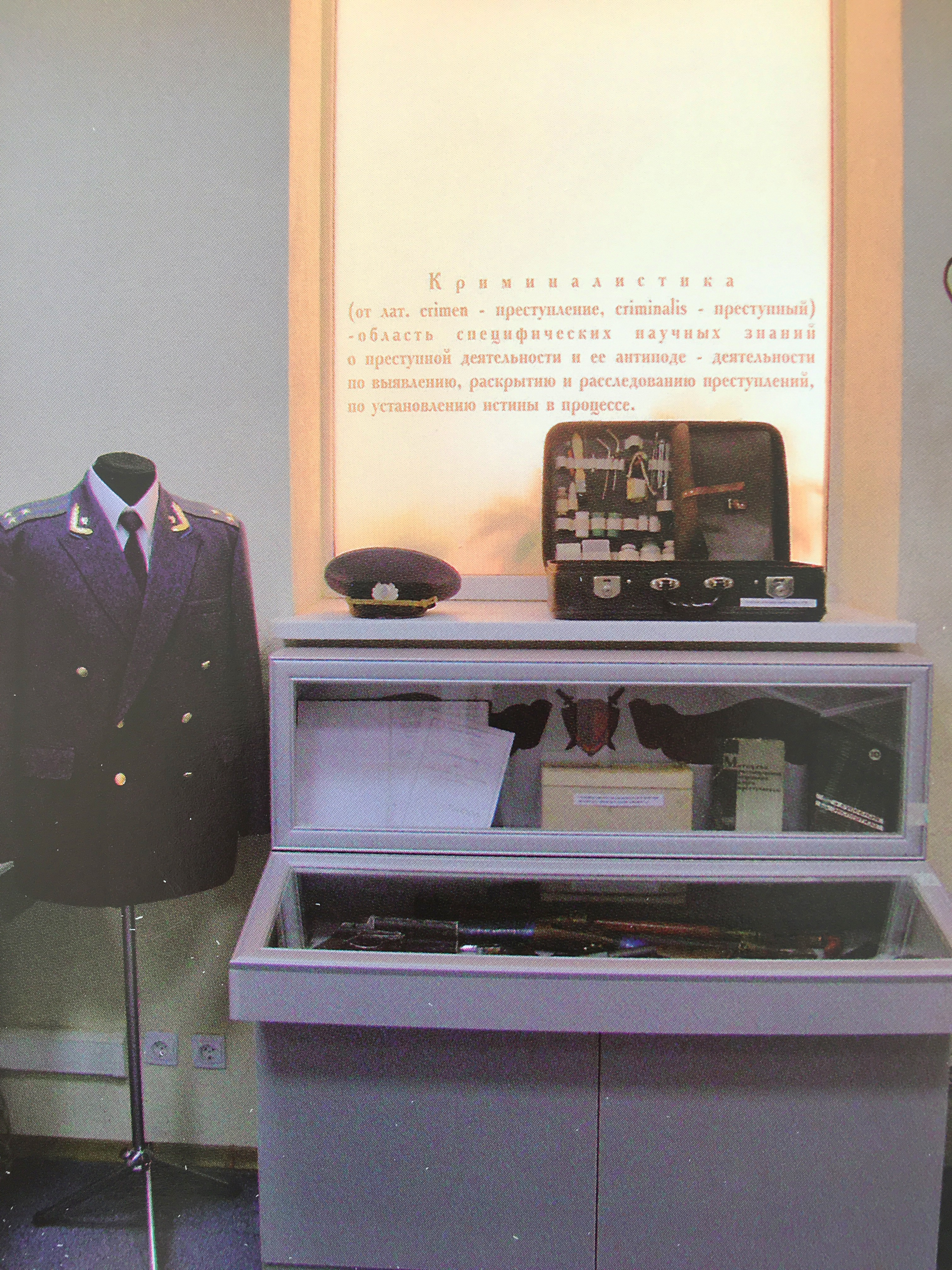
The exhibits of the Historical Museum of Crimean Prosecutor's office

=== Kyiv office ===
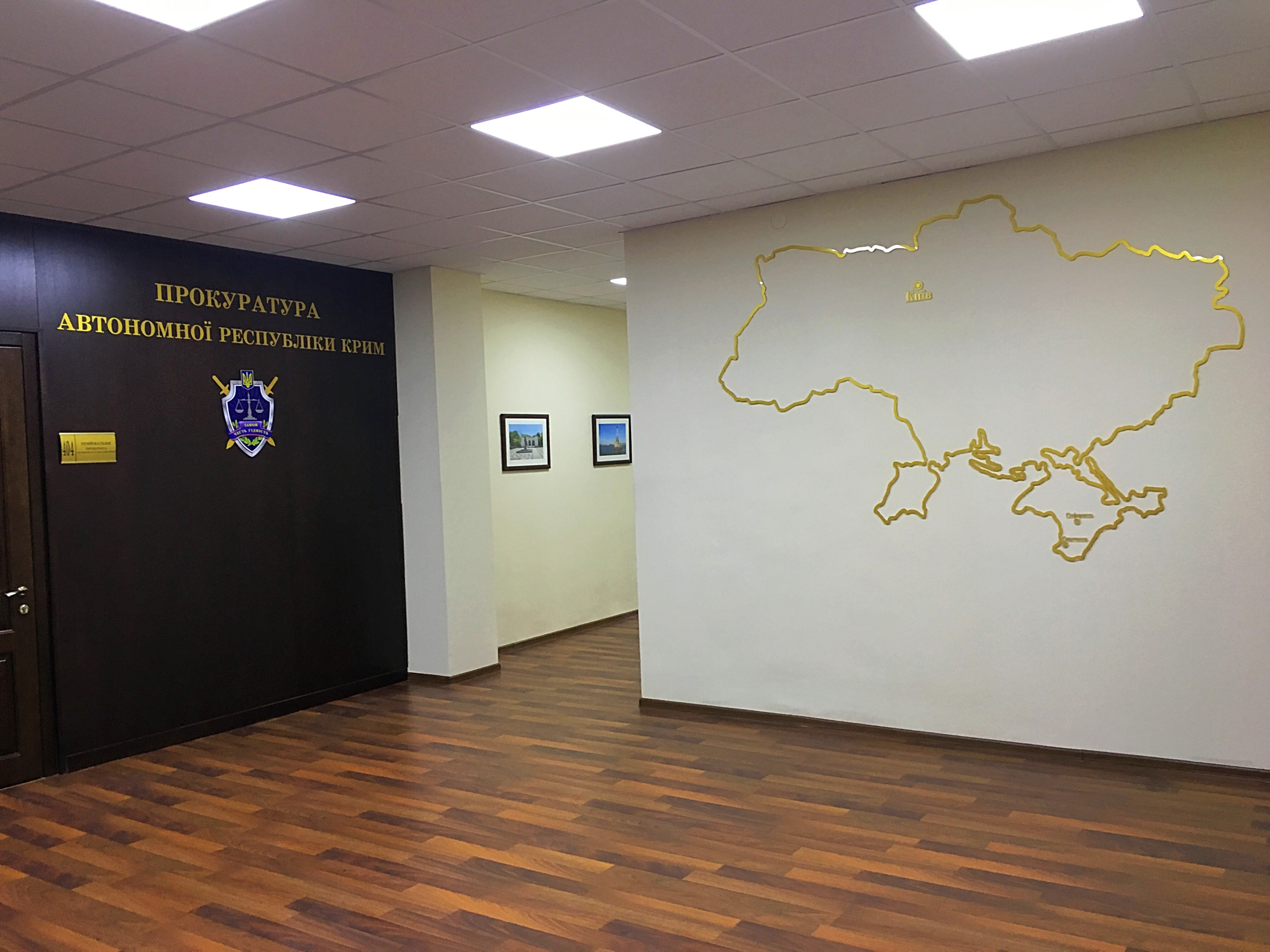

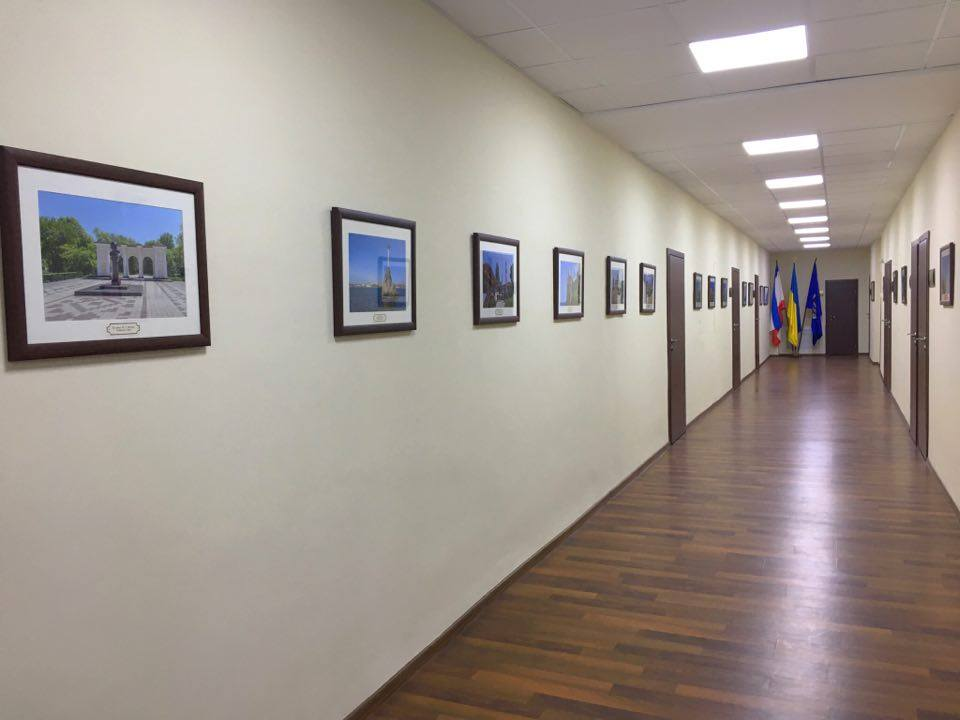

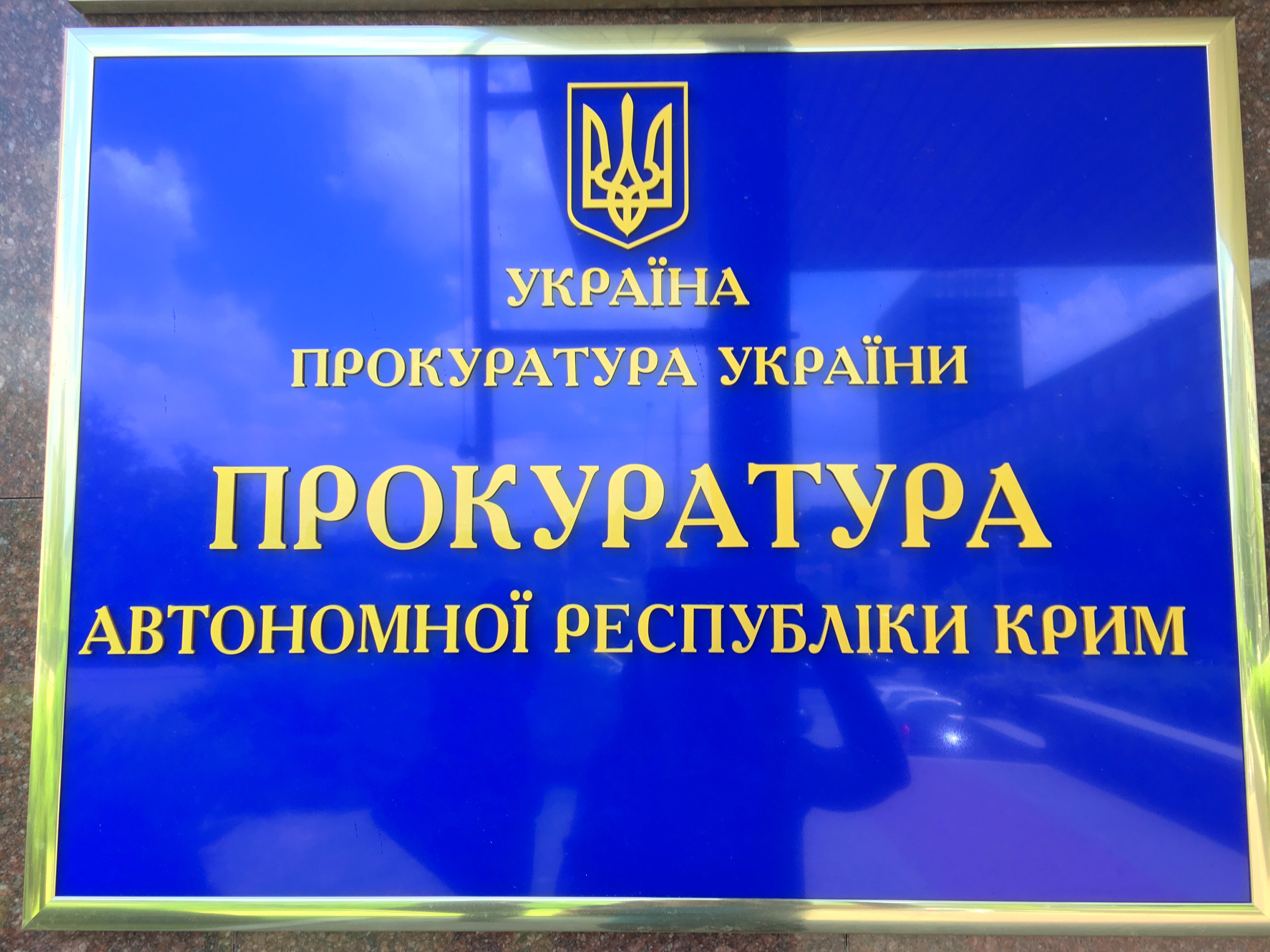
