= Mirsaid Sultan-Galiev =

Tatar Bolshevik (1892–1940)

- Мирсаид Султан-Галиев; Мирсәет Солтангалиев
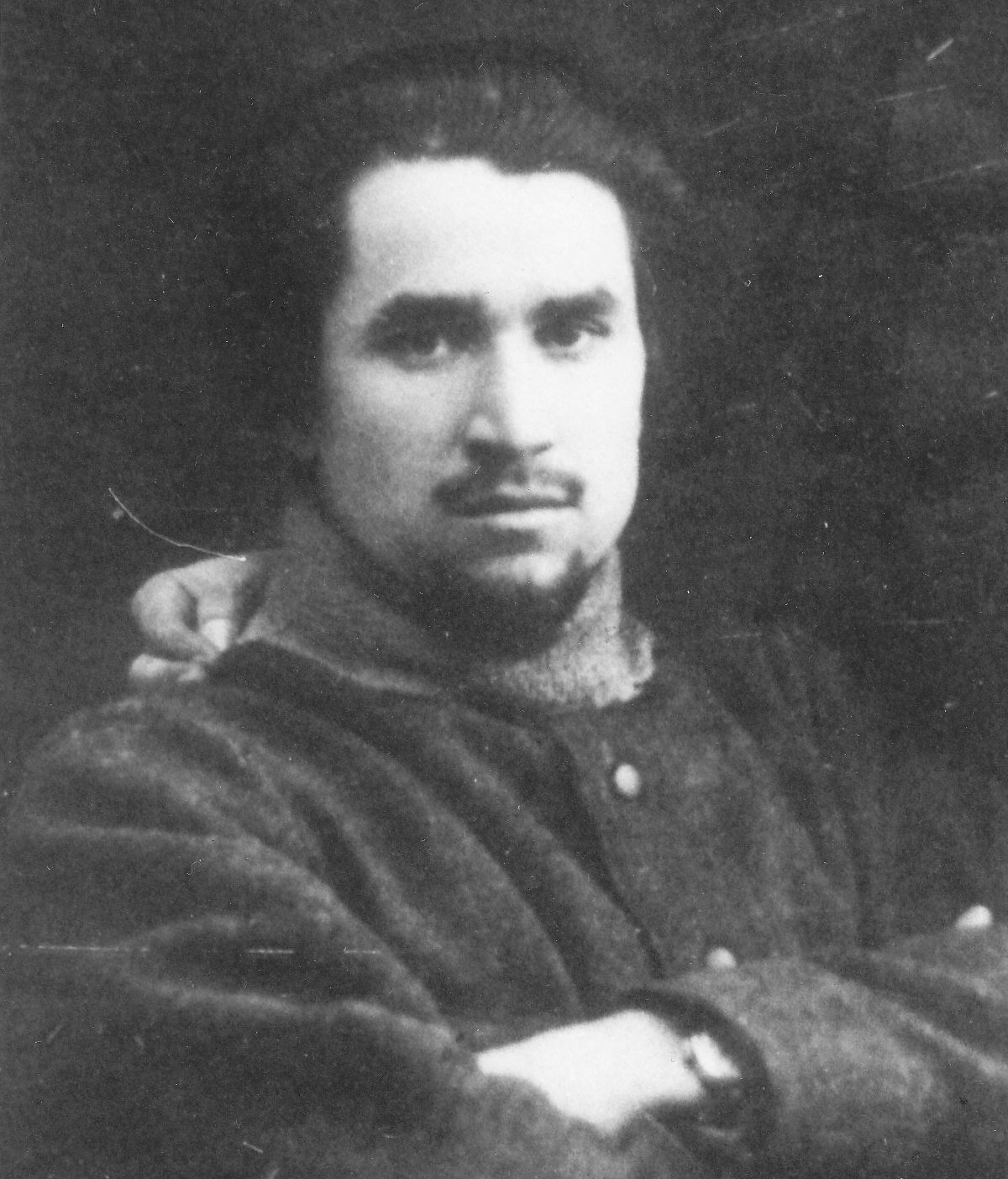
- Portrait of Sultan-Galiev
- Born: July 13, 1892; Elembetevo, Ufa Governorate, Bashkiria, Russian Empire
- Died: January 28, 1940 (aged 47); Moscow, Soviet Union
- Occupation: Politician
- Political party: Communist Party of the Soviet Union
- Movement: Anti-imperialism, Pan-Turkism, National Communism

Mirsaid Khaydargalievich Sultan-Galiev (Tatar: Мирсәет Хәйдәргали улы Солтангалиев, romanized: Mirsäyet Xäydärğäli ulı Soltanğäliev, pronounced [ˌmirsæˈjet xæɪˌdærɣæˈli ulɯ sɔlˌtɑnɣæˈliəf]; Russian: Мирсаид Хайдаргалиевич Султан-Галиев; 13 July 1892 – 28 January 1940), also known as Mirza Sultan-Galiev, was a Tatar Bolshevik revolutionary who rose to prominence in the Russian Communist Party in the early 1920s. He was the architect of Muslim "national communism". His views were seen as a direct threat to the policies of the Comintern; he was imprisoned briefly in 1923 and expelled from the Communist Party. He was rearrested in 1928 and imprisoned for six years. He was then arrested again in 1937 and executed in 1940 during the Stalin period.

== Early life and family ==
Sultan-Galiev, the son of a teacher, was born on July 13, 1892, in the village of Elembet'evo, Ufa Guberniya, Bashkiria, then part of the Russian Empire. He had a difficult and impoverished childhood. His father made very little money as a school teacher, not nearly enough to support his wife and 12 children, and was frequently transferred from place to place. In addition, there was considerable, lasting tension between his parents, because they came from very different layers of Tatar society. Sultan-Galiev later wrote, "My mother was the daughter of a prince – a noblewoman, while my father was a simple "Mishar," and this quite often stung the eyes of my father."

Though his parents could not afford to send him to a private school, Sultan-Galiev was able to learn a great deal from his father and at the latter's maktab, which followed the "New Method" of maktab teaching founded by Ismail Gasprinski (1851–1914). From a young age Sultan-Galiev studied the Russian language and read many of the Russian classics from his father's library. At his father's school, he studied from age 8 to 15, learning Tatar and Arabic, history, geography, and mathematics, while also receiving a basic understanding of the Quran and Sharia. All this, especially his knowledge of Russian, greatly helped his entrance into the Kazan Teachers College (see Tatar State University of Humanities and Education) in 1907.

An avid reader of Russian literature, he translated works by Tolstoy and Pushkin into the Tatar language. In 1913, he married Rauza Chanysheva, who became a leading figure in the women's movement. They separated after personal problems in 1918.

== Political activity ==
Sultan-Galiev was first drawn to revolutionary ideas during the abortive 1905 Revolution. Following the revolution's defeat he moved to Baku, where he came to the attention of Nariman Narimanov. He was further drawn to revolutionary ideas while studying to become a teacher at the Tatar Teachers College in Kazan. At this time, he also received his first lessons in socialism. The future Bolshevik A. Nasybullin and the future Basmachi (see Basmachi Revolt) A. Ishmurzin gave him books on the theory of socialism and conversed with him about the books.

Graduating from the Teacher's College in 1911, Sultan-Galiev began his career as a "half-starved village school teacher and librarian." In 1912 he also started to publish articles in various newspapers in Russian and Tatar, initially under various pseudonyms, such as "Sukhoi [Dry one]," Syn naroda [Son of the People]," "Uchitel'-tatarin [Teacher-Tatar]," "Karamas-kalinets," and then from 1914 under his own name. Over the same period, he also "secretly distributed anti-government proclamations in the Muslim villages of Ufa province and spoke out against the installation of Russian or Christianized Tatar teachers in Muslim schools.

=== World War I and the Bolsheviks ===
As with most people of his generation, World War I played a large role in his personal transformation. With the war's outbreak, Sultan-Galiev and his wife Rauza Chanysheva moved to Baku, where Sultan-Galiev began to write for a variety of newspapers. He seems to have absorbed amongst the city's diverse population of Azerbaijanis, Armenians, Georgians, Russians, Tatars, and Iranians, a deep and growing dissatisfaction with the tsarist autocracy, its resistance to reform, and handling of the war effort. Baku's political climate in combination with the 1916 anti-conscription uprising of Muslims in Central Asia led him to break with the reform-minded Jadidism of his youth and move towards revolutionary socialism.

In May 1917, Sultan-Galiev participated in the All-Russian Muslim Conference in Moscow and was elected to the All-Russia Muslim Council created by it. In July that year he went to Kazan, where he met Mullanur Waxitov, with whom he helped set up the Muslim Socialist Committee, with a program close to that of the Bolsheviks. In November 1917 he joined the Bolshevik faction of the Russian Social Democratic Labour Party. Following the establishment of Narkomnats in June 1917, Sultan-Galiev was asked to become head of the Muslim section. In January 1918 the Central Commissariat of Muslim affairs in Inner Russia and Siberia (Muskom), was set up under the chairmanship of Waxitov, with Sultan-Galiev as representative of the Russian Communist Party. He was appointed the chair of the Central Muslim Military Collegium when it was established in June 1918. He wrote for Zhizn' Natsional'nostei (Life of the Nationalities). Mustafa Suphi acted as his secretary. In the Muskom, Sultan-Galiev also met İsmail Firdevs, a Crimean Tatar revolutionary who became one of his closest ideological followers and public supporters.

In December 1917, in response to some Tatars' accusations that he was betraying his own people to the Bolsheviks, Sultan-Galiev wrote a revealing explanation for his decision to join the Bolsheviks:

I now move to my cooperation with the Bolsheviks. I will say the following: I associate with them not from sycophancy. The love for my people, which lies inherently inside me, draws me to them. I go to them not with a goal to betray our nation, not in order to drink its blood. No! No! I go there because with my whole spirit I believe in the rightness of the Bolsheviks’ cause. I know this; it is my conviction. Thus, nothing will remove it from my soul. I realize that only some of the bolsheviks were able to implement what was promised at the beginning of the revolution. [But] only they stopped the war. Only they are striving to pass the nationalities’ fates into their own hands. Only they revealed who started the world war. What does not lead me to them? They also declared war on English imperialism, which oppresses India, Egypt, Afghanistan, Persia and Arabia. They are also the ones who raised arms against French imperialism, which enslaves Morocco, Algiers, and other Arab states of Africa. How could I not go to them? You see, they proclaimed the words, which have never been voiced since creation of the world in the history of the Russian state. Appealing to all Muslims of Russia and the East, they announced that Istanbul must be in Muslims’ hands. They did this while English troops, seizing Jerusalem, appealed to Jews with the words: ‘Gather together quickly in Palestine, we will create for you a European state.’

=== Revolution ===
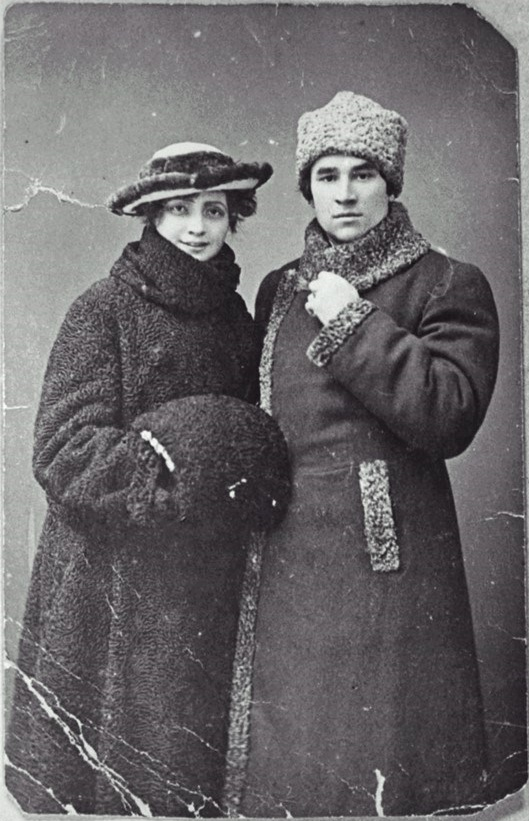
Photograph together with his second wife Fatima Erzina in 1919.

During the Civil War he was active in organising the defence of Kazan against the Whites in August 1918 and liquidating opposition after they had been driven out. He was also instrumental in ensuring that the Bashkir people, led by Zeki Velidi Togan, joined the Bolshevik side which weakened the military potential of Kolchak's army. His knowledge of national movements in the East won him the trust of Stalin and other highly placed Party and government figures. Sultan-Galiev carried out many tasks on the personal orders of Stalin. In April 1919 he again was rushed to the Eastern Front to help shore up the morale of the Tatar 21st division at Malmyzh after Kolchak's spring offensive had forced the Red Army to abandon Izhevsk to the Whites. In June 1919 he was sent to Kazan at request of the local Bolshevik administration to help resolve the national question among the Tatars, but he was soon recalled to Moscow by Lenin to work on the nationality issue in the Narkomnats until 1922.

=== Theory ===
Sultan-Galiev was a proponent of what is today seen as part of the economic and political school revolving around dependency theory. His view that the proletariat of the imperialist core, together with its bourgeoisie, would continue oppressing the "toilers of the East" after a socialist revolution in the core would have been carried out can be seen in a speech of his during the ninth conference of the Tatar Oblast party committee:

If a revolution succeeds in England, the proletariat will continue oppressing the colonies and pursuing the policy of the existing bourgeois government; for it is interested in the exploitation of these colonies. In order to prevent the oppression of the toiler of the East we must unite the Muslim masses in a communist movement that will be our own and autonomous.

— Mirsaid Sultan-Galiev, 1923

The above "quotation" is an excerpt of the speech attributed to Sultan-Galiev. This was voiced at a conference in which Sultan-Galiev himself (already expelled from the party) did not participate.

Sultan-Galiev further believed that within an empire, those regions which have been conquered or colonised ought to be prioritised or worked alongside during a revolution, instead of there merely being a revolution restricted to core countries. The reason for this was that if a revolution was to occur in an isolated manner, an imperialist country could easily exploit the resources of its colonies to defeat any revolutionary movement. However, if such a movement is co-ordinated with movements in colonies or conquered provinces, the chances of a revolution succeeding are increased, since the capabilities of the defending party to exploit and draw upon the resources of its colonial holdings are greatly weakened, if not vanquished entirely. Sultan-Galiev gave the examples of the failure of the Spartacist Uprising and the Hungarian Soviet Republic.

Galiev extended his criticisms of colonialism and states that utilised colonialism to the Americas, where he denounced American actions against Indigenous peoples of the Americas.

If it were possible to compute the degree of exploitation of the East by Western capital, and in this connection, its indirect participation in the emergence of the power of the European and American bourgeoisie which have exploited it and continue to exploit it, then we would see that a lion’s share of the material and spiritual wealth of the “whites” has been stolen from the East, and built at the expense of the blood and sweat of hundreds of millions of laboring masses of “natives” of all colors and races. It was necessary for tens of millions of aborigines of America and Africa to perish and for the rich culture of the Incas to be completely obliterated from the face of the earth in order that contemporary “freedom-loving” America, with her “cosmopolitan culture” of “progress and technology” might be formed. The proud skyscrapers of Chicago, New York, and other cities are built on the bones of the “redskins” and the Negroes tortured by inhuman plantation owners and on the smoking ruins of the destroyed cities of the Incas.

— Mirsaid Sultan-Galiev,

Sultan-Galiev further argued that by the start of the 20th Century, the world had been divided into two camps: the imperialist and exploiting half of the world and the exploited half. Sultan-Galiev often referred to the members of the imperialist world as “Metropolitans”. Galiev argued that the financial culture of Metropolitans had two main properties. Firstly, the methods of production and distribution of essential commodities sat in the hands of the Metropolitan. For instance, Sultan-Galiev highlighted how the majority of industry and its methods of circulation (such as banks) and methods of communication (like telegrams) had been monopolised by the Metropolitans so that these essential goods and services were exclusively enjoyed by mainly the population of Metropolitan countries. Significantly, Galiev did not blame this on the culture of Metropolitan countries, instead blaming the dynamic scene, the changing powers of the state. The second property was found in the efficiency of production and distribution and how it was maximised by parasitism and reactionary attitudes. Sultan-Galiev argued that the basis for this did not end with Monopoly Capitalism and imperialism, but its root was also not in the cultures or races of the Metropols. Sultan-Galiev explained that the process of having to resort to the aid of monopoly capital consisted of the following elements. Firstly, the primary element of the Metropolitan economy is the economy's access to cheap raw materials. Galiev cited the rate of exploitation and how it was retained by preventing the rise of nationalist and anti-colonialist sentiments in colonies by violently cracking down on any such movement. Secondly, Galiev argued that there was an unending competitive war between certain national groups for colonial holdings and estates. In other words, on the one hand, there is an ongoing increase in social conflicts between the metropolitans and their colonies, and on the other hand, the origins of national differences between the different strains of the leaders of metropolitans are also hidden here.

The second element was found in ensuring the cheap sale and production of industrial goods. Sultan-Galiev cited the development of production technology which took place through the exploitation of the industrial workers of the metropolitan countries and similar practices in the colonies. According to Galiev, the relationship between the metropolitan and the colonies is bi-directional. Firstly in the form of raw materials and work forces. Secondly, in terms of exploitation in the markets. Sultan-Galiev argued that this exploitation was not only carried out through slavery or military might. The intensification of colonialist policies to keep industrial products as permanent markets for sale is related to this issue. This last element of the development process of metropolitan material cultures, Sultan-Galiev believed, was particularly important for the relations between the colonies and the metropolitan, because this element constituted the main dynamics of the Metropolitans and the main reason for all social deviations that occur in the development process of modern humanity.

Sultan-Galiev ordered these deviations by examining firstly, the exploitation of resources, especially in colonies in terms of the general interests of humanity. And secondly, the circulation of global production and the irrational order of this general circulation, resulting in a significant amount of human energy being lost or destroyed. Galiev gave an example of the production and export of leather or cotton from Tibet or India to the British Empire, which was then used to make a shoe or a shirt and then sent back to the original country. However, the opposite method occurs in production of necessary consumer goods such as vehicles or machines. Sultan-Galiev thereby argued that it would be more moral to transform raw materials into necessary consumer goods in their country of origin.

Sultan-Galiev took special notice of an arms race between colonial powers and wrote that such a race was not just against colonies, but against other Metropolitan countries. Sultan-Galiev noted that human energy was spent in a massive and inefficient way in order to maintain the status quo and the existing structures of production (the deviances mentioned prior) in an orderly manner. The prevention of the natural development of the productive forces of colonial holdings (which made up a large portion of the world's population), on these grounds created inequality between the people of the Metropolitan countries and those who lived in colonies. Sultan-Galiev argued for the importance of the effects of imperialist war and its consequences through subsequent "revolutionary earthquakes" (Sultan-Galiev provides the wave of revolutions that occurred in the wake of the first world war) and their effects in the politics of Metropolitan nations. Sultan-Galiev believed that this disposition caused two important consequences. Firstly, the existing cultural material of the people of the Metropolitan, that being the division of the nation from private properties, collapses in on itself due to these contradictions. Secondly, linked to this is the development of conditions that provide the possibility of liberation for colonised nations. Conflict between Metropolitans thereby improves the standing of anti-colonial movements.

Sultan-Galiev also believed in what he called "Energetic Materialism" as a means of enabling Socialist revolution in colonised and exploited nations in the formation of a "Colonial International". The ideas of Energetic Materialism have been compared to the Vpered movement in the Bolshevik party.

=== Fallout with the Bolsheviks ===
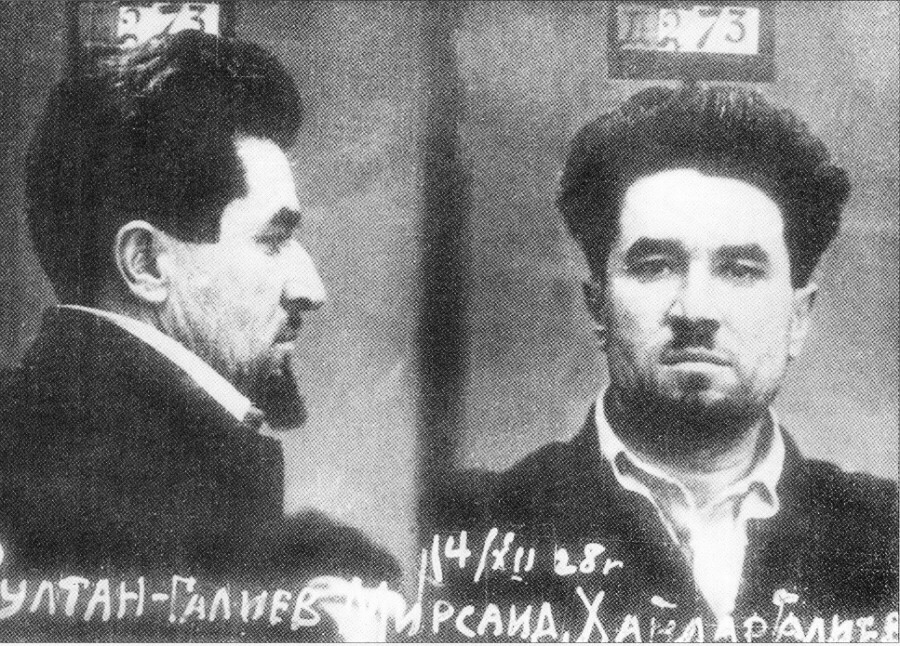
Sultan-Galiev mugshot from 14 December 1928

Sultan-Galiev argued that the Russian Empire had oppressed Muslim society apart from a few big landowners and bourgeoisie. He was, despite this attempt at synthesis, thought of by the Bolsheviks as being excessively tolerant of nationalism and religion and, in 1923, he was accused of nationalist, pan-Islamic, and pan-Turkic deviations and he was arrested and expelled from the party.

He was freed, but with Lenin's death in 1924, he lost his only protector, and remained a political outcast, constantly watched by state security. In these years he spent his time travelling for the Hunting Union and writing occasional reviews and translations. He was accompanied by his second wife Fatima Yerzina, whom he had married in 1918, and their two children.

In 1928, he was arrested a second time and sentenced to be shot in July 1930. However, in January 1931, his sentence was commuted to ten years of hard labour for nationalism and anti-Soviet activity. In 1934, he was released and given permission to live in the Saratov Oblast. At the beginning of 1937, he was again arrested, and was forced to make a confession; he was convicted of being the "organizer and factual leader of an anti-Soviet nationalistic group," who led an "active struggle against Soviet power" and the party "on the basis of pan-Turkism and pan-Islamism, with the goal of tearing away from Soviet Russia Turkic-Tatar regions and establishing in them a bourgeois-democratic Turan state." In December 1939, he received the death sentence which was carried out on 28 January 1940 in Moscow.

== Works ==
- Mirsaid Sultan-Galiev: Izbrannye trudy. Kazan: Gasir, 1998.
