= Volga Commissariat for German Affairs =

The Volga Commissariat for German Affairs started work in Saratov in March 1918. Its role was formalised through a charter which was approved on May 29, 1918, by the People's Commissariat of Internal Affairs and the People's Commissariat for Nationalities of the Russian Soviet Federative Socialist Republic. This was then ratified by the Decree of the Council of People's Commissars (Sovnarkom) of July 26, 1918.

The joint Narkomnat decree specified the role of the Commissariat as:

1. The Commissariat is the ideological centre of socialist work among the German working population.
2. The Commissariat monitors the implementation of the decrees and orders of the Soviet government.
3. The Commissariat promotes the unification of the laboring masses of the German colonists into district councils, taking into account the conditions of the language, customs and customs, and this association is carried out in agreement with the local provincial soviets and in the presence of expressed wishes for such an unification by the German soviets.
4. Decisions of the provincial and district councils affecting the interests of the working population of the German colonies are carried out only with the knowledge and agreement with the Volga Commissariat for German Affairs.

This last point was amplified by the ratifying degree of Sovnarkom that neither the Saratov and Samara governates, nor the more local Saratovsky Uyezd and Samarsky Uyezd were allowed to carry out "food [in essence, the seizure of food] and other work among the colonists" (i.e. the Volga Germans) without the consent of the commissariat.

This commissariet led to the formation of the Labour Commune of Volga Germans.
