= Gyunduz Mamedov =

Azerbaijani-born Ukrainian lawyer and human rights activist

- Гюндуз Мамедов
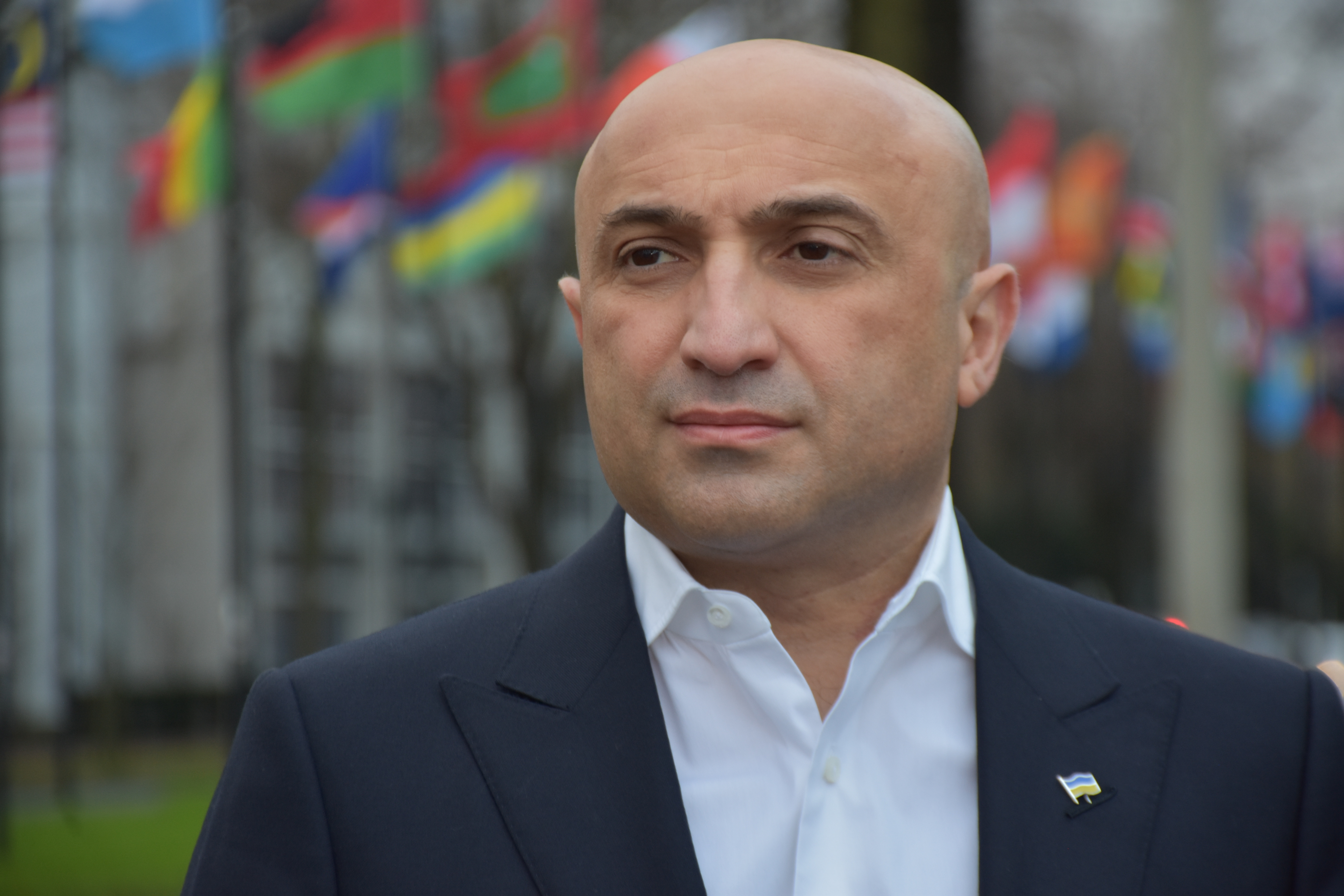

Prosecutor of the Autonomous Republic of Crimea
- Incumbent (contested)
- Assumed office 22 August 2016; Disputed with Natalia Poklonskaya and Oleg Kamshylov since 22 August 2016
- President: Petro Poroshenko; Volodymyr Zelenskyy
- Preceded by: Vasyl Synchuk

Deputy Prosecutor General of Ukraine
- In office 18 October 2019 – 26 July 2021
- President: Volodymyr Zelenskyy
- Prime Minister: Oleksiy Honcharuk; Denys Shmyhal

Personal details
- Born: Gunduz Aidyn oghlu Mammadov; 26 October 1974 (age 51) Ganja, Azerbaijan SSR, Soviet Union (now Azerbaijan)
- Party: Independent
- Education: Odesa Mechnikov National University; Odesa National Economics University

Military service
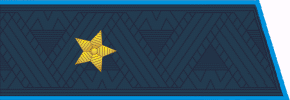
- Rank: State Counselor of Justice 3rd Class

Gyunduz Aidynovych Mamedov (Ukrainian: Гюндуз Айдинович Мамедов; Azerbaijani: Gündüz Aydın oğlu Məmmədov; born 26 October 1974) is an Azerbaijani-born Ukrainian lawyer and human rights activist who has served as Prosecutor of the Autonomous Republic of Crimea since 22 August 2016, and also served as Deputy Prosecutor General of Ukraine from 18 October 2019 to 21 July 2021. In his position as Prosecutor of the Autonomous Republic of Crimea, he is the counterpart to the office of Prosecutor General of the Republic of Crimea, the equivalent position in Russia's Republic of Crimea. Due to the Annexation of Crimea by the Russian Federation, Mamedov had no ability to exert power over Crimea. Mamedov has also investigated Russian forces in the Russo-Ukrainian War for war crimes.

== Early life and career ==
Gündüz Aydın oğlu Məmmədov was born on 26 October 1974 in the city of Ganja, in what was then the Azerbaijan Soviet Socialist Republic of the Soviet Union. In 1996, he graduated from Odesa University, with a degree in law. In 2013, he graduated from the Odesa National University of Economics.

Mamedov's career began in 1996. He worked as the Assistant Prosecutor in the Prosecutor's Office of the Prymorsky Raion of Odesa, later becoming the First Deputy Prosecutor of the Raion. From 2012 until 2013, he worked in the Prosecutor's Office of Kyiv Oblast. During 2013, he served as the Chief Scientific Officer of the Crime-Fighting Problems Research Department in the Scientific and Research Institute of the National Prosecution Academy of Ukraine. From December 2013 to July 2014, he also held the position of the Head of the Investigation Department of the Dnieper Environmental Prosecutor's Office.

In July 2014, Mamedov was again appointed a Prosecutor in Odesa. From December 2015, Mamedov worked as the Deputy Prosecutor of Odesa Oblast. While working in Odesa, he was engaged in high-profile affairs; in particular, he actively fought against the distribution of narcotic substances in law enforcement agencies, to expose corruption schemes and gambling, and arrested a criminal group that carried out robberies, extortion and other actions for two years.

== Prosecutor of the Autonomous Republic of Crimea ==
Гюндуз Мамедов/Gyunduz Mamedov
(@MamedovGyunduz)
tweeted:

Ukrainian:

Цікаво чому Поклонська зможе краще захищати інтереси росіян в Україні на посаді заступника голови @rsgov, а не посла в Кабо-Верде. Правоохоронні органи 🇺🇦мають вимагати екстрадиції всіх осіб, що звинувачені судом у сприянні анексії Криму.

Translation:

I wonder why Poklonskaya will be better able to defend the interests of Russians in Ukraine as deputy chairman @rsgov and not the ambassador to Cape Verde. Law enforcement agencies 🇺🇦must demand the extradition of all those accused by the court of facilitating the annexation of Crimea.

3 February 2022

On 22 August 2016, Mamedov was appointed the Prosecutor of the Autonomous Republic of Crimea. As Prosecutor, he worked to assemble evidence of Russian war crimes in Crimea, with the intention of bringing them to the International Criminal Court. He has called for people involved with the Annexation of Crimea by the Russian Federation, specifically Natalia Poklonskaya, to be extradited to Ukraine.

Mamedov has alleged that Russian authorities have committed war crimes and crimes against humanity. He has accused Russian authorities of stealing more than 4,000 objects, totalling ₴60.2 billion (approximately 2 trillion United States dollars in 2022).

During the work as a prosecutor, the directions of Crimean law enforcement activity in mainland Ukraine were determined, work with the International Criminal Court was organised, cooperation with non-governmental organisations were established, and investigation of criminal proceedings against national security and war crimes during the Russo-Ukrainian War were developed. These moves were reflected in the Strategy for the Development of Activities of the Prosecutor's Office of the Autonomous Republic of Crimea in the conditions of temporary occupation for 2019–2021.

== Deputy Prosecutor General of Ukraine ==
On 18 October 2019, Mamedov was selected by President Volodymyr Zelenskyy as Deputy Prosecutor General of Ukraine. Mamedov's work continued to focus on the persecution of Russian war crimes in Ukraine, including the war in Donbas and the 2014 shootdown of Malaysia Airlines Flight 17. Mamedov advocated for Ukraine to ratify the Rome Statute, as well as recognising war crimes under Ukrainian legislation. In an interview with Ukrinform, he also expressed his support for Zelenskyy's reforms of the Office of Prosecutor General of Ukraine, calling it a "request of society". On 9 April 2021, Mamedov announced that he had sent 19 pieces of evidence of Russian war crimes to the International Criminal Court.

He was the head of the Joint Investigative Team from Ukraine, which was investigating the downing of flight MH17 on July 17, 2014 in the sky over occupied Donbas. The investigative team also managed to establish cooperation with Bellingcat. The investigation into the attack on Malaysian flight MH17 helped the Office of the Prosecutor General to learn how to gather evidence without access to uncontrolled territories. On November 17, 2022, the court in the Netherlands handed down a verdict in the MH17 case: three defendants — two Russian citizens Igor Girkin, Serhii Dubynskyi, and Ukrainian citizen Leonid Kharchenko — were found guilty and sentenced to life imprisonment in absentia, while Russian citizen Oleg Pulatov was acquitted due to lack of evidence. On February 8, 2023, JIT representatives stated at a press conference in The Hague that the President of the Russian Federation was involved in the crash of the liner, as he personally approved the supply of anti-aircraft missiles to the territory of Ukraine. The investigation is currently suspended.

He also coordinated the investigation of the flight PS-752 Tehran-Kyiv. To date, the names of the participants in the attack have already been established. He emphasizes the importance of Ukraine, which is regularly under fire from Iranian Shahed drones, taking an active part in the process of bringing the perpetrators to justice.

In regards to Ukrainian domestic issues, Mamedov was also active; under him, a division of the Prosecutor General's office for protecting children of victims and witnesses started for the first time in Ukrainian history. However, on 26 July 2021, Mamedov resigned from his office as Deputy Prosecutor General, citing "deliberately-created difficult working conditions" by the office of Prosecutor General. Myller, the law firm representing Mamedov, also claimed the involvement of the Security Service of Ukraine against him.

In addition, he was engaged in juvenile justice. In 2020, he initiated the creation of the Department of Child Protection and Combating Violence at the Prosecutor General's Office as well as relevant units in the regions. Therefore, within the Office a mini-model of children's (juvenile) justice was created. Together with experts, UNICEF in Ukraine, the children's ombudsman, they launched the Barnahus project on the protection and socio-psychological support in the legal process for children who have suffered from crimes or witnessed a crime. Together they managed to launch the first pilot project in Vinnytsia. In essence it provides a child therapeutic help, psychological rehabilitation, and only then an interrogation and medical examination for judicial purposes. The task was, among other things, to reduce the number of interrogations of a child to a necessary minimum.

He also implemented the reform of the penitentiary system. At the time, on the initiative of the Prosecutor General's Office, an interdepartmental working group was created in the Ministry of Justice, which was supposed to prepare a draft law on the dual system of regular penitentiary inspections. The Office of the Prosecutor General suggested joint inspections and monitoring visits with the Office of the Ombudsman and civil society. Currently, an agreement has been reached on the creation and start of pilot joint monitoring groups in three Southern regions of the country.

Mamedov’s departure had prompted an outcry from civil society groups, who praised him for his effective coordination and organization of war-crime investigations, including the probe into the downing of flight MH17 — the Malaysia Airlines passenger jet that was shot down by Russia-backed separatists in 2014 while flying over Donetsk. An innovative investigator and lawyer, Mamedov’s team had established fruitful cooperation with the investigative journalism group Bellingcat to untangle the circumstances surrounding MH17.

He was included in the sanctions lists in the Russian Federation twice: as the head of the Prosecutor's Office of the Autonomous Republic of Crimea and the city of Sevastopol in 2018 and as the Deputy Prosecutor General of Ukraine in 2021.

After leaving office, Mamedov's investigation of Russian war crimes has continued. During the 2022 Russian invasion of Ukraine, he announced he was sending information to the Hague regarding war crimes, and provided contacts by which people can send information. He is currently one of the founders of Ukraine.5am coalition, an association of human rights organisations that collects and documents war crimes committed by Russia in Ukraine.

Gyunduz Mamedov mobilized on February 24, 2022, and participated in the defense of Kyiv. During these events, he came up with the idea of establishing a working group aimed at ensuring compliance with international humanitarian law and providing legal services within the Armed Forces of Ukraine. The group’s primary goal was not merely to disseminate knowledge about IHL among service members but also to develop a robust mechanism for its effective implementation.

The group operated in four key areas: ensuring compliance with IHL norms within the Armed Forces of Ukraine; introducing a mechanism for data collection and preservation of evidence of IHL and human rights violations on the battlefield; developing a mechanism to enable Ukrainian Armed Forces personnel to participate in providing free legal aid; designing and implementing a model for engaging the Armed Forces of Ukraine in measures to protect and preserve cultural heritage during armed conflict.

After the destruction of the Kakhovka Hydroelectric Dam, Guynduz Mamedov declared that this was a potential international crime. In his opinion, Ukraine should apply to the Secretary General of the UN about the violation of ENMOD to establish an advisory council, as well as to the International Court of the UN about compensation for the damage caused.

== Awards ==
- Honoured Worker of the Prosecutor's Office of Ukraine
- Merited Lawyer of Ukraine

== Bibliography ==
- Prosecution of international crimes in Crimea
- Prosecutor of the AR of Crimea Gyunduz Mamedov delivers a lecture in Stanford
- Observance of international standards for prisoners of war is not a right of Russia, but its duty
- Sooner or later, crimes committed in the Crimea will be investigated by the International Criminal Court
- Prosecutor of the AR of Crimea Gyunduz Mamedov: "The main task for this year is to make the peninsula unbearable for the aggressor country"
- Why is the Prosecutor's Office of the Autonomous Republic of Crimea persecuting the dead leaders of the Soviet regime?
- Why should the Verkhovna Rada of Ukraine make international "law of war" part of legislation?
- How to not let suspects in treason run abroad
- Functions of the Prosecutor's Office in Ukraine and Azerbaijan (a comparative legal analysis)
- Transformation of the Ukrainian Prosecutor's office functions in modern conditions
- Particularities of prosecution activity in the Austro-Hungarian Empire
- Legal regulation of the Prosecutor's Office of the Autonomous Republic of Crimea activity: positive and negative aspects
- Problematic issues of the protection of interests of citizens in the conditions of temporary occupation of the territory of the Crimean Peninsula
- Prosecuting international crimes in Crimea
