= Muskom =

Muskom was the Central Commissariat of Muslim affairs in Inner Russia and Siberia set up by the Bolsheviks in January 1918 as part of Narkomnats. Mullanur Waxitov was appointed as chair, although he was not a member of the Communist Party. Mirsäyet Soltanğäliev served as the representative of the Bolsheviks.

An initial congress was organised in November 1918. A second congress was organised in November 1919 and was addressed by Vladimir Lenin and Joseph Stalin.

== Central Muslim Military Collegium ==
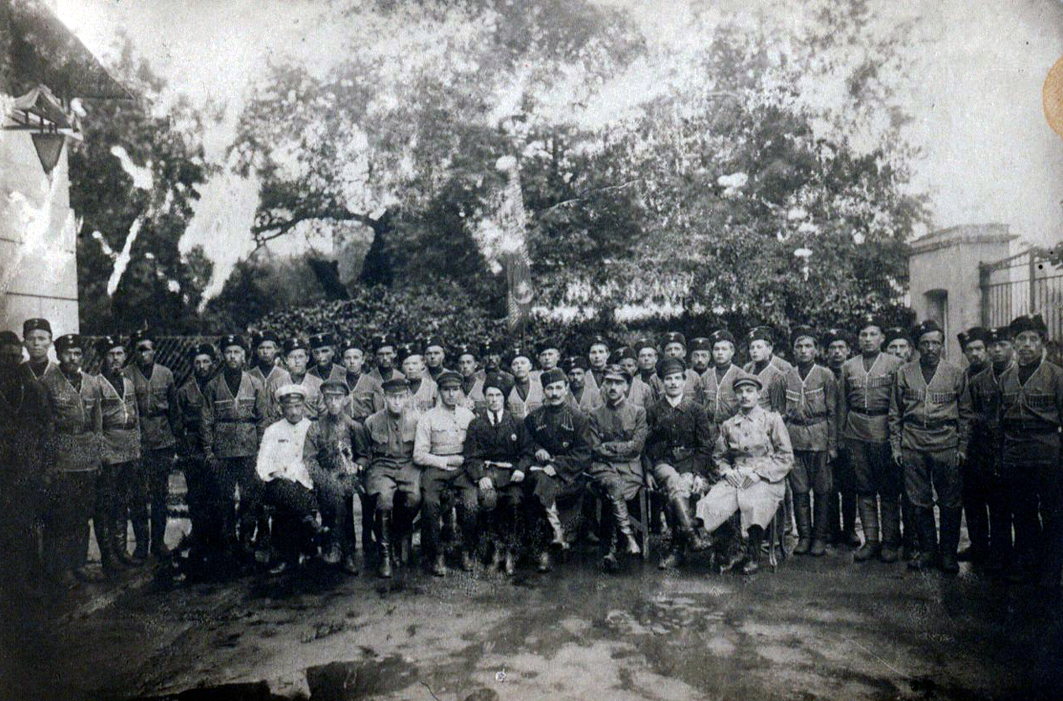
Mullanur Vakhitov with members of Central Muslim Military Collegium on 1 August 1918 (Vakhitov sitting on center)

Attached to Muskom was the Central Muslim Military Collegium (CMMC), which organised Muslim troops into a fighting force on the Red side. Soltanğäliev was appointed its chair in December 1918. Karim Tinchurin was the chief of the culture department.
