= People's Commissariat for Nationalities =

Soviet government organisation (1917–1924)

The People's Commissariat of Nationalities of the RSFSR (Russian: Народный комиссариат по делам национальностей РСФСР, Narodny komissariat po delam natsional'nostey RSFSR), abbreviated NKNats (Russian: НКНац) or Narkomnats (Russian: Наркомнац), an organization functioning from 1917 to 1924 in the early Soviet period of Russian and Soviet history, tasked with dealing with non-Russian nationalities. Its head, Joseph Stalin, as the chairman of the People's Commissariat of Nationalities (1917–23), served as a member of the Council of People's Commissars.

== Origins ==
It was established even before the October Revolution on 11 June 1917 by the Petrograd Soviet as part of three measures to create state forms that would guarantee federal and autonomous solutions to national questions in the Russian Revolution:

- complete civil equality for all citizens
- the right to use the mother tongue in official business, on par with Russian
- the formation of a Soviet of nationality affairs – Narkomnats.

This decision was made in response to the crisis triggered by the Central Council of Ukraine's demands for autonomy for national territories and a seat at any peace conference. These demands were rejected by Alexander Kerensky. Narkomnats was set up as an organ of the Soviets to prepare for the Constituent Assembly, particularly in regard to how Ukrainian autonomy could be handled. It provided for the organisation of a congress of representatives from all of Ukraine, which in turn would set up a Ukrainian Constituent Assembly. At this time the Bolsheviks opposed any national autonomy; however, on 13 August, Joseph Stalin published a tract that floated the idea of the Party might set up an agency for nationality affairs. This came at a time when Kerensky and Mensheviks like Nikolay Chkheidze were arguing for a unified state. Kerensky told Latvian representatives that they could only hope for the status of Zemstvo.

In 1918, Joseph Stalin as the chairman presided over five or six of the first seven meetings of the Narkomnats Collegium, but failed to attend the next twenty one.

== Specific commissariats related to Narkomnats ==
- Belnatskom was the Belarusian commissariat established 31 January 1918
- Evkom was the Jewish commissariat
- Muskom was the Muslim commissariat, chaired by Mullanur Waxitov
- Volga Commissariat for German Affairs, charter approved by Narkomnat on May 29, 1918
