= Muslim Socialist Committee of Kazan =

Religious organization in Kazan, Russia

- Мусульманский социалистический комитет
- Abbreviation: MSK
- Formation: 1917

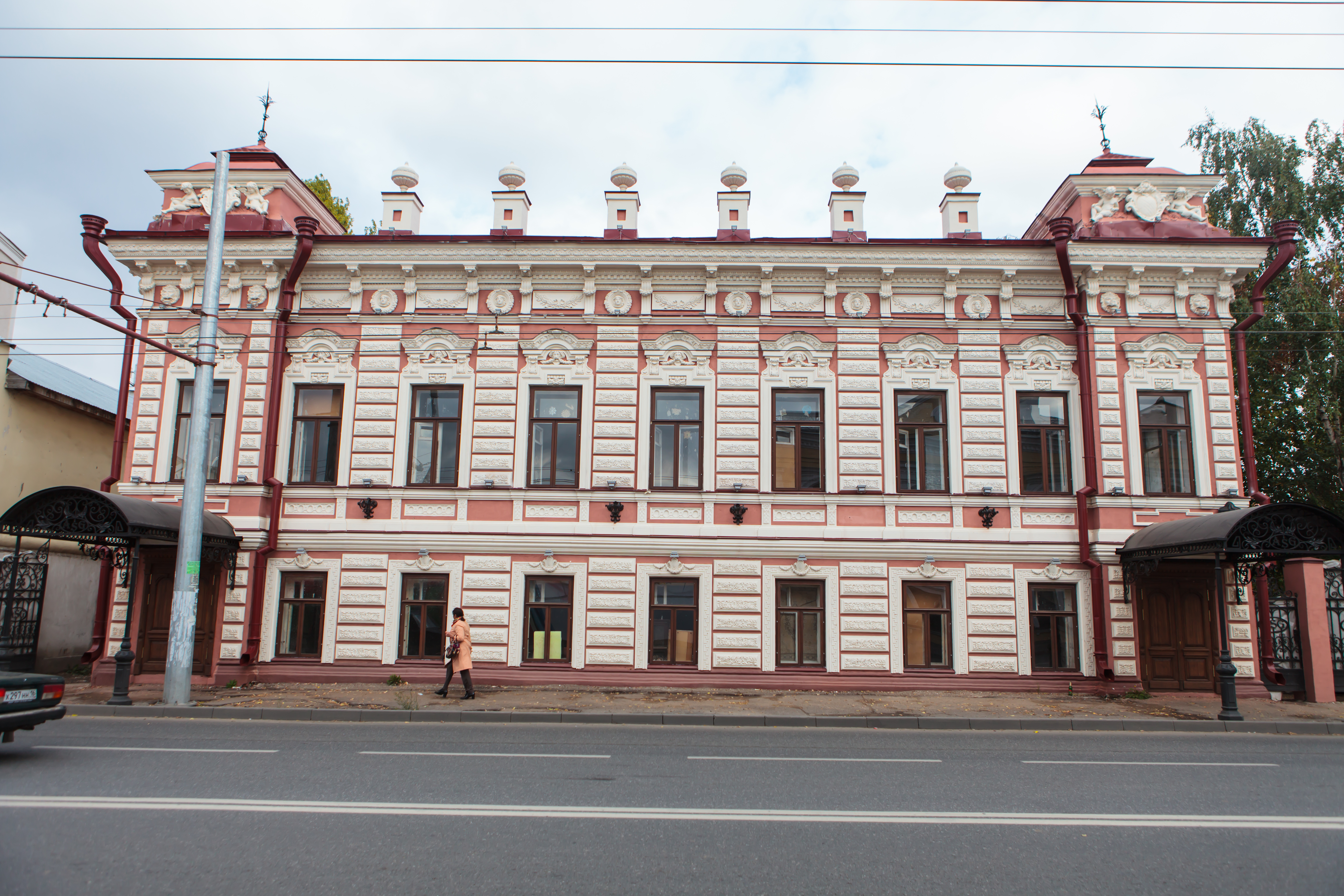
House of S.A. Zemlyanov, where plans for the MSCK were organized.

The Muslim Socialist Committee of Kazan (MSK; Russian: Мусульманский социалистический комитет) was an organization which existed briefly in Kazan during the Russian Revolution.

== Biography ==
It was the best known of a number of Muslim Socialist Committees set up between February and April 1917. It originally included in its ranks people of Menshevik, Bolshevik, Social Revolutionary and Anarchist views, who all, however, accepted a distinction between Russians and Muslims (which in this region meant the Muslim ethnic groups of Tatars and Bashkirs). They were largely former radical nationalists whose interest in Marxism was part of what is known as National Communism. They had a view of socialism tied to that of the Islamic ummah and included land reform in their programme. They were very anti-clerical and hostile to the landowners.

Following the Bolshevik seizure of power in October 1917, the MSK played a leading role in combating the Harbi Shura forming Red Guard detachments for this purpose. This conflict reached its height at the Second Pan-Russian Muslim (Tartar) Military Congress, held in Kazan, February and March 1918.

Soviet historians were critical of the Committee, considering them not a truly proletarian organisation, rather a petty bourgeois organization.

== MSK activists ==
- Mullanur Waxitov
- Mirsäyet Soltanğäliev

== See also ==
- List of Islamic political parties
