= Mullanur Waxitov =

Tatar revolutionary

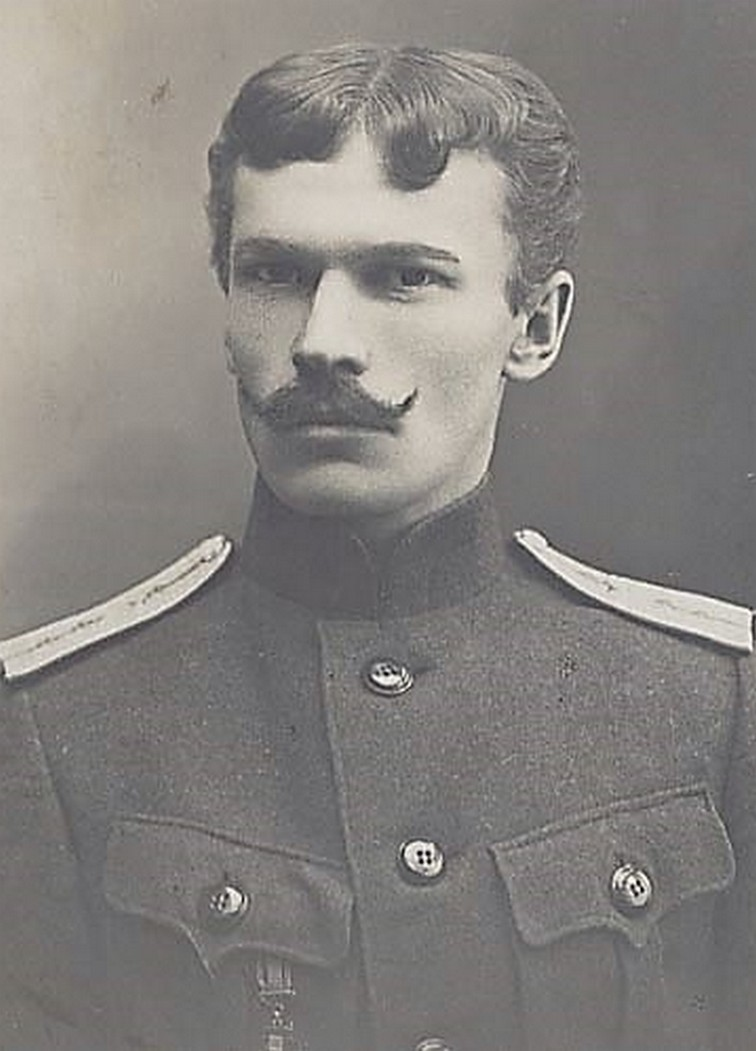

Mullanur Mullacan ulı Waxitov a.k.a. Mullanur Waxitov (Tatar Cyrillic and Russian: Мулланур Вахитов, Tatar pronunciation: [muˌlɑˈnur wʌˈçitəf]), also spelled Vakhitov (10 August 1885 – August 1918) was a Tatar revolutionary active in the Russian Revolution.

== Early life ==
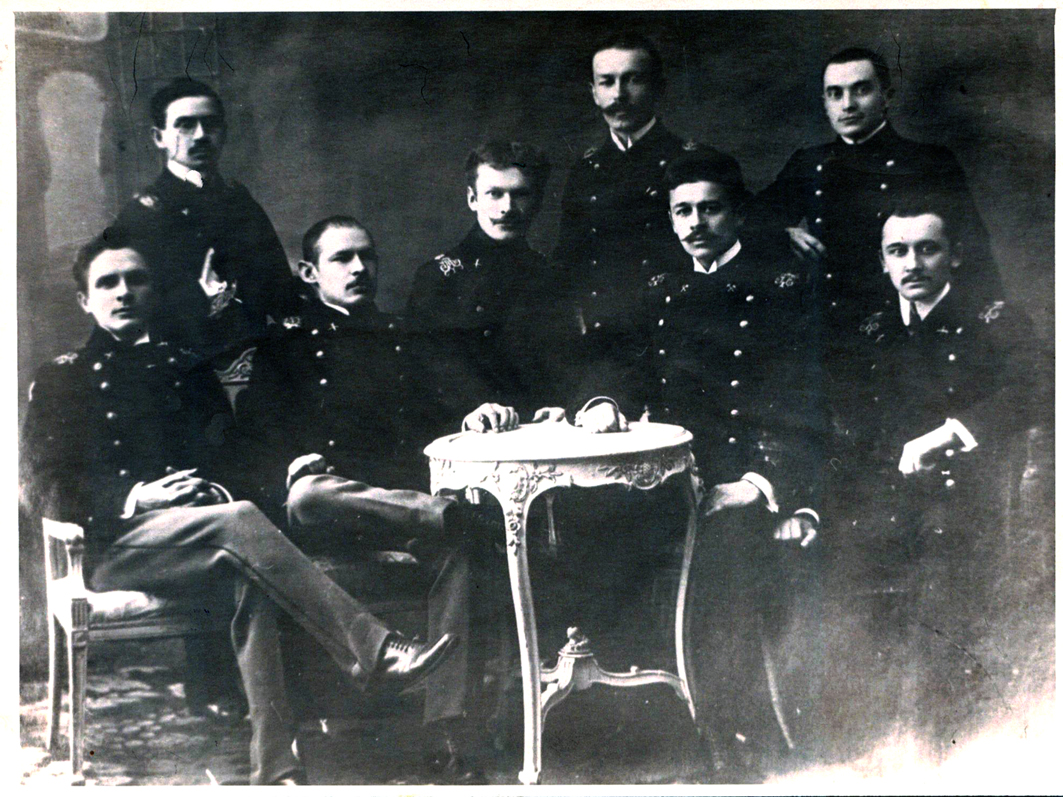
Mullanur Vakhitov in St. Petersburg Polytechnic Institute (Vakhitov seated in the middle)

Born in Kazan, he entered secondary school run by Social Democrats there in 1899. He participated in the 1905 revolutionary events and in 1906 he joined a Marxist study circle. In 1907, he entered economical department of St Petersburg Polytechnic Institute and moved to the law department of St Petersburg Psychoneurological Institute in 1912. There, he met Vladimir Bekhterev, Mikhail Frunze, Yakov Gamarnik, and Larisa Reisner. At this time, he organised a study circle for Muslim students. By April 1917, he was back in Kazan where got involved in the Muslim Socialist Committee (MSK), which was influenced by the Communist Party in Kazan. He was the editor of a journal entitled Qızıl Bayraq.

== After the October Revolution ==
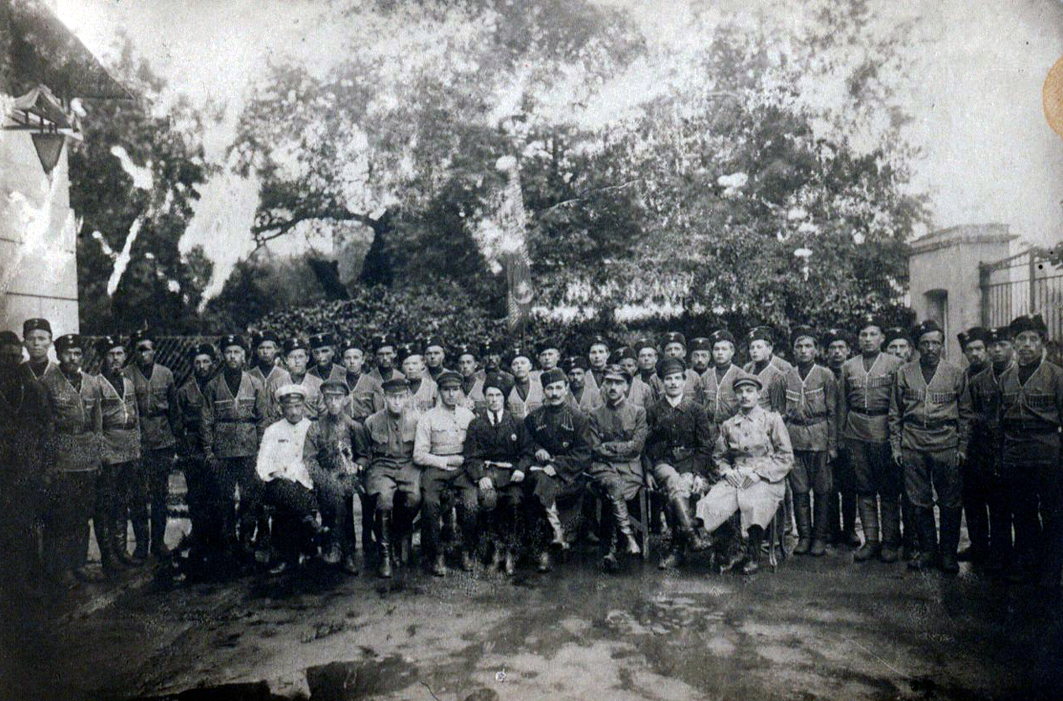
Vakhitov with members of Central Muslim Military Collegium on 1 August 1918 (Vakhitov sitting on center)

In October 1917, Waxitov became a member of Kazan VRK. In January 1918, he was appointed commissar of Central Muslim Commissariat of Narkomnats (People's Commissariat on Nationalities) and a chairman of Central Military collegium attached to People's Commissariat of Military and Navy affairs.

== Death ==
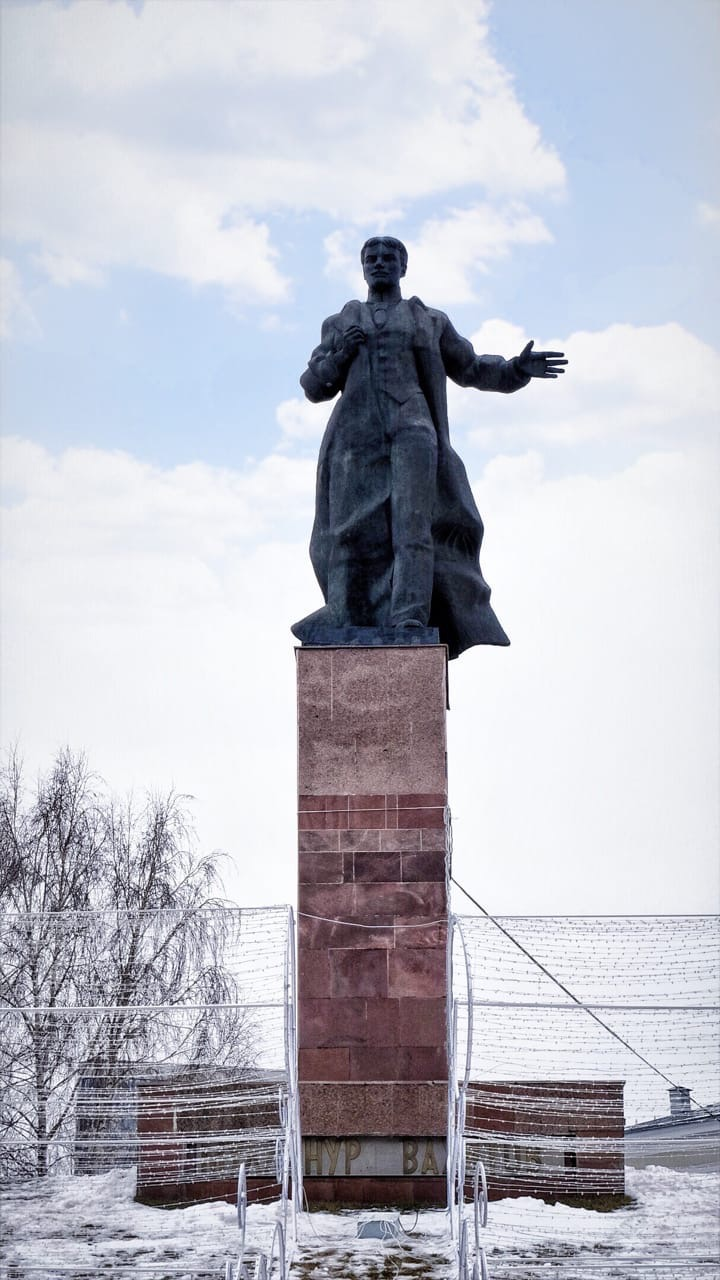
Monument to Mullanur Vakhitov in Kazan

In August 1918, he fought in the defence of Kazan from an attack by Czechoslovak Legion forces, but he was captured and hanged.

Waxitov was never a member of the Communist Party, as the Bolsheviks were known after their 7th Congress.
