= Michael Stever =

American filmmaker and actor

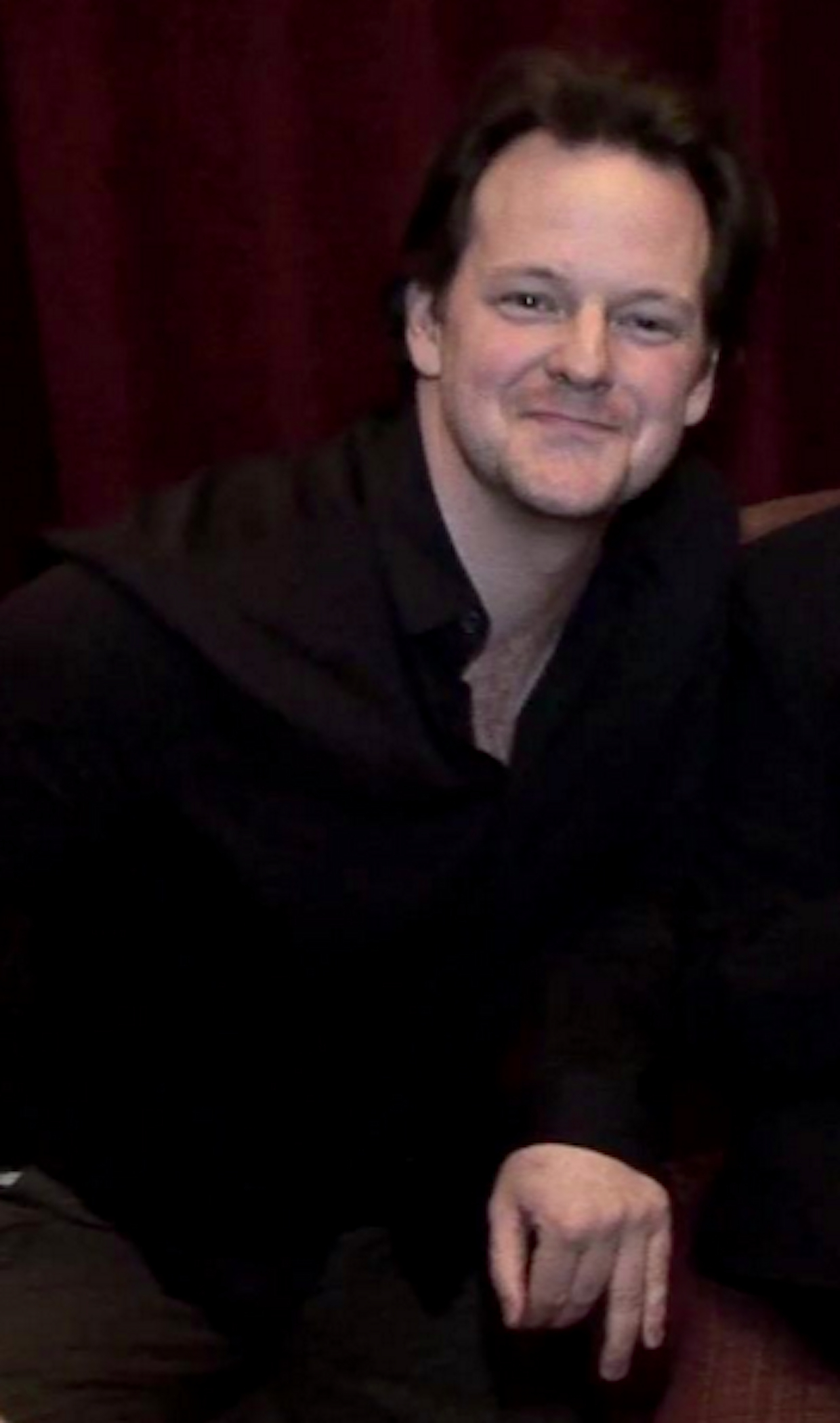
- Born: Medford, Oregon, United States
- Occupations: Film director, producer, cinematographer, screenwriter, actor, singer and dancer.
- Years active: 1991–present
- Known for: Super Force, Broadway: The Golden Age By The Legends Who Were There, Every Act of Life
- Website: michaelstever.net

Michael Stever is an American film director and editor, cinematographer, producer, writer and actor who's known for his work on Super Force, Broadway: The Golden Age By The Legends Who Were There, Every Act of Life and his debut documentary short films, Saturday Nightmares: The Ultimate Horror Expo! and Resurrecting Carrie.

== Early life ==
Michael Lee Stever was born in Medford, Oregon, the son of Robert Roy Stever who was in retail management with JCPenney, and a decorated World War II veteran, and Elizabeth Anne Stever, (née Gubler) a nursing assistant. Stever is the youngest of four siblings. He attended Rancho Cordova High School and Sacramento High School's Regional Occupational Program, where he produced his first film at age seventeen.

== Career ==
Stever's theater credits include The Best Little Whorehouse in Texas with Juliet Prowse, the 30th anniversary tour of Mame with Morgan Brittany, the role of Joe Hardy in NETworks national tour of Damn Yankees, Diesel in a Berlin Germany based production of West Side Story directed by longtime WSS vet Alan Johnson, Brisbane Australia's 1988 World Expo, and singing and dancing in Reno Nevada at the historic MGM Grand Hotel, in Donn Arden's Hello Hollywood, Hello. Stever also appeared in the first United States Regional production of The Will Rogers Follies at Gateway and Candlewood Playhouses in Long Island and at the Paper Mill Playhouse in New Jersey in several productions, including Oliver! with George S. Irving and South Pacific with Ron Raines.

He made his television debut in a 1991 episode of the science fiction series, Super Force, where he plays an alien abductee. In 1998 he portrayed Mortimer Brewster opposite Betty Garrett and Carole Cook in a University of Central Oklahoma production of Arsenic And Old Lace. He returned to UCO shortly thereafter performing with Shirley Jones.

In 2001 Stever began a stint behind the camera as unit production manager on the documentary, Broadway: The Golden Age, by the Legends Who Were There. His first play Erzsebet, a historical account of sixteenth-century Hungarian countess, the infamous Erzsebet Bathory received a reading in New York City in 2004.

Stever screened his first independently produced documentary, Saturday Nightmares; The Ultimate Horror Expo! in New York City in October 2010. In 2011, he filmed and co-produced his first indie comedy/drama Checking In, an independent feature based on the New York Fringe Festival play of the same name by Brian Hampton. He followed this with a 2012 music video Don't Come A Knockin for singer/songwriter Dwight Thomas Vaughn. Two following projects, the 2012 documentary short film Resurrecting Carrie, featuring Piper Laurie and Jan Broberg's Guide To Thespians, Sociopaths & Scream Queens, featuring Elijah Wood, were chosen as official selections at the third and fifth annual Macabre Faire Film Festivals, first and second annual Scares That Care film festivals, as well as the first annual ParaFest Festival in Bethlehem, Pennsylvania. and the inaugural FEARnyc film festival, in New York City.

He reunited with Shirley Jones and Marty Ingels in 2011 for his self-produced documentary short, Jon Finch: The Ultimate Impresario. He has produced mini-documentaries, including a collaboration with Stephen Schwartz in 2011 chronicling his first opera, Séance on a Wet Afternoon. He films and writes for Broadwayworld.com, TheaterPizzazz, and TheatreArtLife. Stever also served as the official camera man for The Drama Desk Awards in New York City. He has also worked as a filmmaker and videographer.

In 2014 Stever met and collaborated with A Nightmare on Elm Street star, Heather Langenkamp. Together they produced Heather's Freddy Cut Nightmare which chronicled her first charity haircut auction on behalf of 'Scares That Care.' Later that year Stever worked with actor/playwright Stu Richelle, and director/dramaturge Linda S. Nelson filming and creating numerous multi-media installments for the Off-Off Broadway production of Vietnam…Through My Lens.

May 2016, Stever joins forces with Broadway dancer, choreographer and historian Mercedes Ellington - Grand Daughter to Duke Ellington and founder of The Duke Ellington Center For The Arts. Also worked with Columbus State University Dance Department head Karyn Tomczak and Lester Schecter PR to produce a documentary honoring Mercedes which screened at the New York Friars Club on December 20, 2017. In late 2017 filmed and co-produced two TEDTalks episodes with performance coach Kelsey Crouch. Episodes included 'How BS cured the blind girl' with Vicky DeRosa, and 'Design experiences, not things' with Abraham Burickson.

In 2017, worked as co-cinematographer in director Jeff Kaufman and producer Marcia Ross's award-winning Terrence McNally documentary, Every Act Of Life as well as a Q&A filmed by Stever released shortly after McNally's passing in 2020 and features candid recollections from McNally himself, director Kaufman, Nathan Lane, Tyne Daly, F Murray Abraham, Joe Mantello and was moderated by New York Times columnist Frank Rich.

In May 2018, he collaborated with Richard Hillman PR, executive producer Harvey Butler and director/playwright Rajendra Ramoon Maharaj to film the play, Little Rock a historical drama about the Little Rock Nine. Filmed and edited by Stever and co-produced in conjunction with the Mabel Mercer Foundation, KT Sullivan and Ken Bloom's Harbinger Records, Sidney Myer: Live At The Laurie Beechman Theatre DVD.

In 2019, Stever filmed with Klea Blackhurst, Lorna Dallas, Lynn Henderson, and singer/songwriter Dawn Derow. He also did several collaborations with Broadway veteran Karen Mason.

On January 13, 2021, Stever was the recipient of the BroadwayWorld Best Filmed Show, Presented From Archival Video award along with Karen Mason, Paul Rolnick, director Barry Kleinbort and musical director Christopher Denny. The award celebrated Mason's October 15, 17 and 18 online screenings of Mason At Mamas In March, which was filmed at the historic Manhattan cabaret club Don't Tell Mama which she helped open. Hoboken Library produced a staged reading of ′Torch Song Trilogy: Widows And Children First′ on August 28, 2021. It featured NYC cabaret luminary Sidney Myer as Arnold, Florence Pape as Mrs. Beckoff, Stever as Ed, Logann Grayce as David and was directed by Ethan Galvin.

== Activism and personal life ==
In addition to 'Scares That Care,' Stever has donated his skills to numerous U.S. based charitable organizations including AIDS Walk New York, and the 2006 Tourette Syndrome Celebrity Fundraiser. On February 23, 2009 he documented the historic 'Defying Inequality Broadway Concert,' interviewing the likes of Lynda Carter, Billy Porter, Gavin Creel, Tamara Tunie, Jonathan Groff, Stephen Schwartz and many others as Stever stood in support of marriage equality after the Supreme Court of California upheld a ban on same-sex marriage approved by voters in November 2008 by ballot Proposition 8.

== Filmography ==
2003	The Brini Maxwell Show (TV series)	camera operator, production crew
2003	Third Watch (TV series)	production crew
2003	Broadway: The Golden Age, by the Legends Who Were There (Documentary feature)	unit production manager, camera operator
2004	Confessions of a Teenage Drama Queen (Feature film)	production crew
2004	Still Life Independent short	second assistant director
2006	The 2006 Tourette Syndrome Celebrity Fundraiser	camera operator
2006	The Barry Z Show (TV series)	camera operator
2008	How to Get and Keep an Agent (Instructional Video)	associate producer, segment director, camera operator – part one, lead editor
2010	Saturday Nightmares: The Ultimate Horror Expo of All Time! (Documentary short)	executive producer, creator, director of photography and camera operator, editor
2011	Stephen Schwartz: Séance Is a 'Wicked' Mistress (Documentary short)	producer, writer, director of photography and camera operator
2011	League Of Professional Theatre Women's 30th Anniv Kick Off (Video short/featurette)	executive producer, executive creative director, director of photography and camera operator, editor
2011	Jon Finch: The Ultimate Impresario (Documentary short)	executive producer, executive creative director, creator, director of photography and camera operator, editor
2011	Girls Who Smoke (Dramatic short)	additional photography
2011	Artists and Alchemists (Documentary feature)	grip
2012	Drama Desk Panel Discussion - It's a Hard Act to Follow (Documentary)	producer, director of photography
2012	Archaeology of a Woman (New York City screening featurette)	additional photography – documentary segments
2012	Resurrecting Carrie (Documentary short)	executive creative director, writer, director of photography and camera operator, editor
2012	Watch What Happens: Live (TV series)	camera operator – 1 episode
2012	Dwight Thomas Vaughn: Don't Come a Knockin (Music video)	director of photography and camera operator, editor
2013	Checking In (Independent feature)	director of photography and cinematography
2013	Jan Broberg's Guide to Thespians, Sociopaths & Scream Queens (Documentary short)	creator, executive producer, director of photography and camera operator, editor
2014	Tamara Tunie: Legends From 'The Burgh' (Featurette)	director of photography, cinematographer, lead editor
2014	Heather's Freddy-Cut Nightmare! (Featurette)	producer, director, cinematographer, lead editor
2014	Fay Wray: A Life (Documentary feature)	additional cinematography, research assistant
2015	Disorganized Zone (TV series)	additional cinematography
2016	Abducted in Plain Sight aka Forever 'B' (Documentary feature)	filmed and produced introductory fund raising video
2017	A Very Sordid Wedding (Independent Feature)	additional photography – documentary segments
2017	All In with Cam Newton (TV series)	additional cinematography
2017	Every Act of Life (Documentary feature)	cinematography
2018	Vicky DeRosa: How BS cured the blind girl (TEDTalks lecture)	co-producer, director of photography, editor
2018	Abraham Burickson: Design experiences, not things (TEDTalks lecture)	co-producer, director of photography, editor
2019	Klea Blackhurst: One Of The Girls (Filmed Concert, Birdland Jazz Club, NYC)	director of photography, editor
2019	Lynn Henderson: A Skitch in Time (Filmed Concert, Don't Tell Mama, NYC)	director of photography, editor
2020	Terrence McNally: Every Act of Life Q&A (post screening Q&A)	director of photography, editor
2020	Lorna Dallas: Home Again (Filmed Concert, Birdland Jazz Club, NYC)	director of photography, editor
2020	Karen Mason: Mason At Mamas In March, Online streamed concert from 2015	director of photography, editor
2021	Broadway: Beyond the Golden Age, premiered August 14, 2021 on PBS as part of Great Performances	camera operator, production crew
2023	On The Steps Of The Shubert, premiered March 14, 2023 at BroadwayWorld	director of photography, camera operator, editor

=== Film roles ===
Year	Title	Role	Notes
2002	Analyze That	SWAT Team Gunman	Directed by Harold Ramis

=== TV roles ===
Year	Title	Role	Director	Notes
1991	Super Force	Mike	Sidney Hayers	TV series Season 1 Episode 18
2001	Deadline	Bomb Squad Expert	Robert Berlinger	TV series Season 1 Episode 12
