= Reza Khandan =

Iranian human rights activist

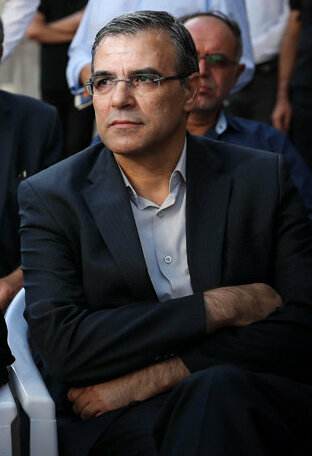
Khandan on August 31, 2017

Reza Khandan (Persian: رضا خندان) is an Iranian human rights activist and graphic designer. The husband of human rights lawyer Nasrin Sotoudeh, Khandan has campaigned against compulsory veiling and the death penalty in Iran and publicly advocated for his wife when she was imprisoned between 2018 and 2021. In 2019, Khandan was charged in absentia with breaching national security and distributing anti-state propaganda, and was recalled to prison to carry out his sentence in 2024.

== Personal life ==
Khandan married lawyer Nasrin Sotoudeh in 1995, with whom he has two children, Mehraveh and Nima; he lives with his family in Tehran. Sotoudeh described Khandan as "truly a modern man" who supported her with her work.

== Activism ==
Sotoudeh rose to prominence in Iran for representing imprisoned Iranian opposition activists following the 2009 presidential elections. She also represented adults sentenced to death for crimes committed as children, as well as women arrested for appearing in public without a hijab. Khandan publicly supported women's right to choose whether or not to veil, and stated he was against the forced imposition of any religion or belief by the Iranian government.

Sotoudeh was arrested in 2018 and charged with espionage, the dissemination of propaganda, and disparaging Ali Khamenei, the Supreme Leader of Iran. In March 2019, she was sentenced to 38 years imprisonment in addition to 148 lashes. Khandan became a more prominent figure nationally and internationally after he began publicly campaigning for Sotoudeh's release. Khandan and fellow activist Farhad Meysami created thousands of badges reading "I oppose the mandatory hijab" in Persian; Khandan also frequently posted updates about Sotoudeh on social media. Khandan also publicly supported other jailed human rights activists, including Kylie Moore-Gilbert, who was held at Qarchak Prison at the same time as Sotoudeh. Khandan was featured in Nasrin, a 2020 documentary by American filmmaker Jeff Kaufman.

In July 2021, Sotoudeh was released from prison on medical furlough.

== Arrest and imprisonment ==
In September 2018, Khandan was arrested and charged with "spreading propaganda against the system" and "colluding to commit crimes against national security" after posting updates about Sotoudeh's case on social media, in addition to speaking out against mandatory veiling for Iranian women and had also started a petition calling for the immediate commutation of the death sentence issued to Kurdish activist Pakhshan Azizi. Khandan was arrested alongside fellow activist Farhad Meysami with whom he had distributed anti-mandatory veiling badges. The Centre for Human Rights in Iran called Khandan's arrest "a blatant attempt by the Iranian authorities to pressure Sotoudeh, as well as [Khandan], into silence". Khandan was released on bail in December 2018.

On 22 January 2019, Khandan and Meysami were both tried (Khandan in absentia) by Branch 15 of the Tehran Revolutionary Court. Khandan received a five-year prison sentence for crimes against national security, and an addition one-year sentence for spreading anti-state propaganda. He was also banned from leaving Iran and engaging in online activities. Khandan's sentence was reduced to three years and six months by the Court of Appeal. Unlike Khandan, Meysami remained detained in prison, and Khandan publicly supported Meysami and his subsequent hunger strikes on social media.

In February 2023, Khandan received summons to complete his 2019 prison sentence. The decision was criticised by PEN America and the International Bar Association's Human Rights Institute. Khandan ultimately was not recalled to prison.

On 12 December 2024, Khandan was arrested at his home in Tehran and transported to a local police station. Sotoudeh attempted to visit him but was prevented from doing so after she refused to wear a chador. The following day, Khandan was taken to court before being sent to Evin Prison. Khandan's daughter Mehvareh confirmed Khandan's arrest on social media, and Khandan's legal team and wife subsequently reported that Khandan had been arrested in order to complete his 2019 prison sentence. Khandan's lawyers stated their intent to appeal to the Supreme Court to secure Khandan's release. By April 2025, he was being held in Evin prison. The family reported that their son was beaten by officials while attempting to visit him.

In June 2025, Evin Prison, where Khandan was held, was struck during the Israeli bombing campaign, killing at least 71 people. In October 2025, the Robert F. Kennedy Human Rights, PEN America and the Raoul Wallenberg Centre for Human Rights filed a petition and urgent action request on his behalf with the United Nations Working Group on Arbitrary Detention, citing risks to his life and health. In April 2026, following the re-arrest of Sotoudeh, a coalition of 30 international legal organizations wrote to several UN Special Procedures mandate holders requesting the immediate and unconditional release of both Khandan and Sotoudeh. In June 2026, the Working Group issued an opinion declaring Khandan's detention arbitrary and calling for his immediate release, and expressed concern that his case reflected a widespread practice of arbitrary detention in Iran. As of October 2026, no release has been reported.

== See also ==
- Mehraveh Khandan
- Nasrin Sotoudeh
