= Robert Calhoun =

Robert Calhoun may refer to:

- Bob Calhoun, member of the Virginia Senate
- Robert Calhoun (producer), American TV producer
