= Farhad Meysami =

Iranian doctor, teacher and civil activist

Farhad Meysami (born November 17, 1969) is an Iranian physician, teacher and civil activist. He believes in non violence and civil disobedience. He was sentenced to five-year sentence in August 2018 for crimes such as "spreading propaganda against the regime". He was released in February 2023 after a four-month hunger strike that drew international attention.

== Background ==
Farhad Meysami graduated from Tehran University of Medical Sciences, and opted for a career in high school education. He later established a publishing company, Andisheh-Sazan, which grew in the late 1990s. Andisheh-Sazan was particularly known to high schoolers for its test preparation books published for the Iranian university entrance exam (in Iran:Concours). At the peak of its growth, Meysami shut down the company and engaged in human rights activism in Iran. He was arrested on July 31, 2018, and went on a hunger strike on August 1, 2018.

== Detention and hunger strikes ==
Meysami was arrested at his personal library and transferred to ward 209 of Evin prison in Tehran. He went on a hunger strike on August 1, 2018, to protest against "unjustified accusations, the illegal procedure following his detention, and denial of his right to access an independent lawyer". He was not able to publicly announce his hunger strike before the 19th day of his strike, as he was being held in solitary confinement until that day. The allegation brought against Meysami is acting against the national security, a rather common accusation against political and civil rights activists in Iran. Apparently, Meysami's support for the “Girls of Enghelab Street”—a series of protests against compulsory hijab in Iran— is being used to corroborate the charges against him. To provide the material evidence for the accusation the security forces have confiscated pin-back buttons from his library in Tehran. The pin-back buttons have "I do not agree with compulsory hijab" marked on them in Persian.

Reza Khandan, a friend of Meysami's who had several phone conversations with him after his detention, published the following lines on his Facebook on behalf of Meysami, explaining the reasons behind his hunger strike:

My hunger strike is out of respect for my own dignity and the dignity of those who have been detained on baseless accusations; those who are being interrogated while they have no access to a proper and legitimate legal representation. I will not, under any conditions, succumb to the demands of this illegal procedure.

=== Denial of the right to access a lawyer ===
Meysami was denied access to an independent lawyer. Arash Keikhosravi, an Iranian lawyer, was barred from registering as his lawyer due to the section 48 of the recently amended the Criminal Procedure Code. Section 48 states that those accused of national-security crimes must choose their lawyer from a single list of 20 lawyers picked by the head of the judicial system of Iran. Human rights organizations have argued that it means there are only a few government picked lawyers who are allowed to represent political prisoners at court. This new policy gives further license to infringe on the rights of defendants.

=== Hunger strike of Nasrin Sotoudeh ===
On the 25th day Meysami's hunger strike, his imprisoned friend and human rights activist, Nasrin Sotoudeh, went on hunger strike to support Meysami. Reza Khandan, husband of Nasrin Sotoudeh, published her open letter about the reasons behind her strike on his Facebook page:

Dear fellow citizens,

After having arrested myself two months ago, the agents of the ministry of the national security have now arrested our fellow citizen Dr. Farhad Meysami. Furthermore, they have searched my house as well as my relatives' and friends' houses, seeking to "discover" and confiscate badges opposing the compulsory hijab. […] Until now, none of my correspondence with the authorities has led to any results. Therefore, I see no other option than entering on hunger strike from August 25th to protest against the arrest of and judicial pressure on my friends and family.

In hope of the establishment of law and justice in our dear country, Iran.

=== Second hunger strike ===
Meysami went on a second hunger strike from October 2022 until his release on Feb 10, 2023 to protest the oppression of Mahsa Amini protesters and forced hijab in Iran. Images of his weak body went viral on social media in early February 2023, some even compared him with survivors of the Auschwitz. While judicial officials denied him being on hunger strike, his lawyer, Mohammad Moghimi, said his client's life is in danger and he had lost 52 kg (115 lb). A few days layer, according to his lawyer, Meysami was asked for a bail to be released, which he denied; regardless, he was released on February 10, 2023.

== International call ==
On 24 October 2018, Amnesty International called on Iran to release Farhad Meysami immediately and unconditionally. Amnesty confirmed that he is being held in the medical clinic at Evin prison in Tehran against his will to pressure him into ending his hunger strike.

Late November 2018, a group of UN human rights experts including Javid Rehman U.N. Special rapporteur on the situation of human rights in Iran and four others experts concern about Meysami's situation who has been on hunger strike since August.

The US State Department also supported Farhad Meysami in a statement. Following US State Department support for Farhad Meysami, he wrote a sharp letter of criticism against US Secretary of State Mike Pompeo and the Donald Trump administration:

"I would rather spend my whole life in the imprisonment of a group of oppressive compatriots and spend my life trying to correct their mistakes, but I do not want the support of those who, by turning their backs on all principles of law and ethics, have come out of the wise and peaceful the JCPOA agreement and impoverished millions of my compatriots by imposing inhumane sanctions. Of course, I thank all the human rights activists. But I urge Mr. Pompeo and Mr. Trump to shed their crocodile tears elsewhere".

In December 2018, Meysami was given a five-year prison sentence, a one-year restriction on his civil and political rights and a two-year travel ban by Branch 15 of the Revolutionary Court, for charges of "spreading propaganda against the system" and "gathering and colluding to commit crimes against national security". His sentence that was upheld on appeal in August 2019.

On 14 October 2020 it was reported that he spent eight days in solitary confinement after contracting COVID-19.

== Release from Prison ==
On the evening of February 10, 2023, Iranian media outlets reported the release of Farhad Meysami from prison. Mohammad Moghimi, the lawyer for Farhad Meysami, confirmed his release in an interview with the Etemad newspaper. Moghmi stated that Meysami had been asked to post bail for his release, an offer which he declined. Ultimately, Meysami was set free without having to post bail.
