= Farley Granger =

American actor (1925–2011)

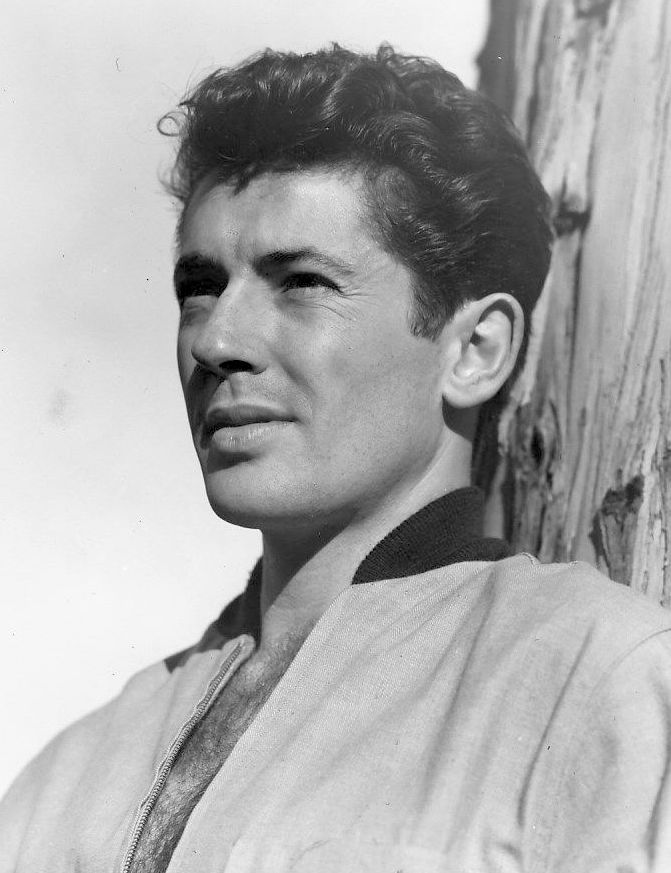
- Granger in 1951
- Born: Farley Earle Granger Jr. July 1, 1925; San Jose, California, U.S.
- Died: March 27, 2011 (aged 85); New York City, U.S.
- Occupations: Actor; singer; acting coach
- Years active: 1943–2004
- Partner: Robert Calhoun (co. 1963; d. 2008)

Farley Earle Granger Jr. (July 1, 1925 – March 27, 2011) was an American actor. Granger was first noticed in a small stage production in Hollywood by a Goldwyn casting director, and given a significant role in The North Star (1943), a controversial film praising the Soviet Union at the height of World War II, but later condemned for its political position. Another war film, The Purple Heart (1944), followed, before Granger's naval service in Honolulu, in a unit that arranged troop entertainment in the Pacific. Here he made useful contacts, including Bob Hope, Betty Grable and Rita Hayworth. It was also where he began exploring his bisexuality, which he said he never felt any need to conceal.

His role in Hitchcock's Rope, a fictionalized account of the Leopold and Loeb murder case of 1924, earned him much critical praise though the film got mixed reviews. Hitchcock cast him again in Strangers on a Train, as a tennis star drawn into a reciprocal murder plot by a wealthy psychopath; he described this as his happiest film-making experience.

Granger continued to appear on stage, film and television well into his 70s. His work ranged from classical drama on Broadway to several Italian-language films and major documentaries about Hollywood. For his contribution to television, Granger has a star located at 1551 Vine Street on the Hollywood Walk of Fame.

== Early life ==
Granger was born in San Jose, California, the son of Eva (née Hopkins) and Farley Earle Granger Sr. He lived at 1185 Hanchett Avenue in the Hanchett Residence Park neighborhood.

His wealthy father owned a Willys-Overland automobile dealership, and the family frequently spent time at their beach house in Capitola on Monterey Bay. Following the stock market crash in 1929, the Grangers were forced to sell both their homes and most of their personal belongings and move into an apartment above the family business, where they remained for the next two years. As a result of this financial setback and the loss of their social status, both of Granger's parents began to drink heavily. Eventually the remainder of their possessions were sold at auction to settle their debts, and the elder Granger used the last car on his lot to spirit away the family to Los Angeles in the middle of the night.

In the 1930s, the family lived in a small apartment in a seedy part of Hollywood, and Granger's parents worked at various temporary jobs. Their drinking increased, and the couple frequently fought. Hoping he might become a tap dancer, Granger's mother enrolled him at Ethel Meglin's, the dance and drama instruction studio where Judy Garland and Shirley Temple had started.

Granger's father found work as a clerk in the North Hollywood branch of the California Department of Unemployment, and his salary allowed him to put a small down payment on a house in Studio City, where their neighbor was actor/dancer Donald O'Connor. At his office, Granger's father became acquainted with comedian Harry Langdon in the early 1940s, who advised him to take his son to a small local theatre where open auditions for The Wookey, a British play about Londoners struggling to survive during World War II, were being held. The 17-year-old Granger's use of a Cockney accent impressed the director, and he was cast in multiple roles. The opening night audience included talent agent Phil Gersh and Samuel Goldwyn casting director Bob McIntyre, and the following morning Gersh contacted Granger's parents and asked them to bring him to his office that afternoon to discuss the role of Damian, a teenaged Russian boy in the film The North Star.

Granger auditioned for producer Goldwyn, screenwriter Lillian Hellman and director Lewis Milestone. Hellman was trying to convince Montgomery Clift to leave the Broadway play in which he was appearing, and when her efforts proved to be futile, the role was given to Granger. During the 1940s, Goldwyn signed him to a seven-year contract for $100 per week.

== Early career ==
The studio publicity department was concerned audiences would confuse Granger with British actor Stewart Granger, so they suggested he change his name and offered him a list from which to choose. "The names were all interchangeable, like Gordon Gregory and Gregory Gordon. I didn't want to change my name", Granger later recalled. "I liked Farley Granger. It was my father's name, and his grandfather's name. They kept bringing me new combinations, and finally I offered to change it to Kent Clark. I was the only one who thought it was funny." Eventually the studio issued a press release announcing Farley Granger, a senior at North Hollywood High School, had been cast in The North Star after he responded to an ad in the local paper. "I thought that was a really dumb story", said Granger. "The truth was much more interesting."

Making the film proved to be a fortunate start to Granger's career. He enjoyed working with director Milestone and fellow cast members Dana Andrews, Anne Baxter, Walter Brennan and Jane Withers, and during filming he met composer Aaron Copland, who remained a friend in later years. When released in 1943, when the Soviet Union was still an American ally in World War II, the film was savaged by critics working for newspapers owned by William Randolph Hearst, a staunch anti-Communist who felt the movie was Soviet propaganda.

For Granger's next film, he was loaned out to 20th Century Fox, where Darryl F. Zanuck cast him in The Purple Heart (1944), in which he was directed by Milestone and again co-starred with Dana Andrews. Still a teenager, Granger became a close friend of supporting cast member Sam Levene, a character actor from New York City who took him under his wing. He also became a friend of Roddy McDowall and found himself linked with June Haver in gossip columns and fan magazines.

Upon completion of The Purple Heart, Granger enlisted in the United States Navy. Following U.S. Navy Recruit Training in Farragut, Idaho, he sailed from Treasure Island in San Francisco to Honolulu. During the 17-day crossing, he suffered from chronic seasickness and lost 23 pounds, and upon arrival in Hawaii he was admitted to the hospital for several days of rehydration. As a result, the remainder of his military career was spent onshore, where he first was assigned to the cleanup crew at an enlisted men's club situated at the end of Waikiki Beach and then to a unit in Honolulu that worked with Army Special Services that was commanded by classical actor Maurice Evans, who put together and arranged entertainment for all the troops in the Pacific. It was here that he had the opportunity to meet and mingle with visiting entertainers such as Bob Hope, Bing Crosby, Betty Grable, Rita Hayworth, Hedy Lamarr, Gertrude Lawrence, and many others.

It was during his naval stint in Honolulu that Granger had his first sexual experiences, one with a hostess at a private club and the other with a Navy officer visiting the same venue, both on the same night. He was startled to discover he was attracted to both men and women equally, and in his memoir he observed,

I finally came to the conclusion that for me, everything I had done that night was as natural and as good as it felt ... I never have felt the need to belong to any exclusive, self-defining, or special group ... I was never ashamed, and I never felt the need to explain or apologize for my relationships to anyone .... I have loved men. I have loved women.

Granger returned to civilian life and was pleased to discover his parents had curbed their drinking and were treating each other more civilly. Goldwyn increased his weekly salary to $200 and presented him with a 1940 Ford Coupe. The actor was introduced to Saul Chaplin and his wife Ethel, who became his lifelong mentor, confidante and best friend. Through the couple, Granger met Betty Comden, Adolph Green, Jerome Robbins, Leonard Bernstein and Gene Kelly, who invited him to join his open house gatherings that included Judy Garland, Lena Horne, Frank Sinatra, Betty Garrett, Johnny Mercer, Harold Arlen and Stanley Donen. Most influential among his new acquaintances was director Nicholas Ray, who cast Granger in his film noir, The Twisted Road (working title). The film was nearing completion in October 1947 when Howard Hughes acquired RKO Radio Pictures, and the new studio head shelved it for nearly a year before releasing it in 1948 under the title They Live by Night in a single theater in London. Enthusiastic reviews led RKO to finally release the film in the States in late 1949. During the two years it had remained in limbo, it had been screened numerous times in private screening rooms, and one of the people who saw it during this period was Alfred Hitchcock, who was preparing Rope.

Granger was in New York City when he was summoned to return to Hollywood and discuss Rope with Hitchcock. The night before their initial meeting, Granger coincidentally met Arthur Laurents, who had written the film's screenplay, which was based on the 1929 play Rope's End by Patrick Hamilton, a fictionalized account of the Leopold and Loeb murder case of 1924. It was not until he began reading the script that he connected its author with the man he had met the previous night. Granger and Laurents met again, and Laurents invited the actor to spend the night. He declined, but when the offer was extended again several days later, he accepted. It proved to be the start of a romantic relationship that lasted about a year and a frequently tempestuous friendship that extended for decades beyond their breakup.

In Rope, Granger and John Dall portrayed two intellectuals who commit a murder simply to prove they can get away with it. The two characters and their former professor, played by James Stewart, were supposed to be homosexual, and Granger and Dall discussed the subtext of their scenes. Because The Hays Office was keeping close tabs on the project, however, the final script was so discreet that Laurents remained uncertain of whether Stewart ever realized that his own character was homosexual. Hitchcock shot the film in continuous, uninterrupted 10-minute takes, the amount of time a reel of Technicolor film lasted, and, as a result, technical problems frequently brought the action to a frustrating halt throughout the 21-day shoot. The film ultimately received mixed reviews in 1948, although most critics were impressed by Granger, who in later years said he was happy to be part of the experience, but wondered "what the film would have been like had [Hitchcock] shot it normally" and "had he not had to worry about censorship".

Upon the completion of Rope, Goldwyn cast Granger, Teresa Wright, David Niven, and Evelyn Keyes in Enchantment (1948), which was panned for a weak script and indifferent direction by Irving Reis. It failed at the box office, as did his next project, Roseanna McCoy (1949), during which he and Laurents parted ways. While filming Side Street (1950) on location in 1949 Manhattan for Anthony Mann, Granger briefly became involved with Leonard Bernstein, who invited him to join him on his South American tour. By the time Granger completed the film, the composer/conductor had married Costa Rican pianist and actress Felicia Montealegre. The two men remained friends until Bernstein's death.

== Leading roles ==
In November 1949, Granger, who had two years to go on his contract with Goldwyn, signed a new five-year contract with the producer.

Granger's next two films for Goldwyn in 1950, Edge of Doom and Our Very Own, were unpleasant working experiences, and the actor refused to allow the producer to loan him to Universal Pictures for an inferior magic carpet saga. When he was placed on suspension, he decided to accompany Ethel Chaplin (who had separated from her husband) and her daughter on a trip to Paris. At the last moment, they were joined by Arthur Laurents, who remained behind when the group departed for London to see the opening of the New York City Ballet, which had been choreographed by Jerome Robbins. He and Granger engaged in a casual affair until the actor was summoned to return to New York to help publicize Edge of Doom and Our Very Own, both of which received dreadful reviews. Goldwyn cancelled the nationwide openings of the latter, hoping to salvage it by adding wraparound scenes that would change the focus of the film, and Granger refused to promote it any further. Once again placed on suspension, he departed for Europe, where he spent time in Italy, Austria, and Germany with Laurents before being contacted about an upcoming film by Alfred Hitchcock.

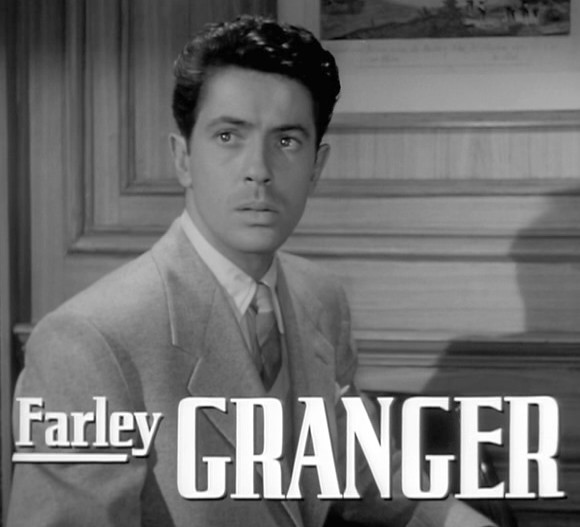
In the trailer for Strangers on a Train (1951)

The project was Strangers on a Train (1951), in which Granger was cast as tennis player and aspiring politician Guy Haines. He is introduced to psychopathic Bruno Anthony, portrayed by Robert Walker, who suggests they swap murders, with Bruno killing Guy's unfaithful wife and Guy disposing of Bruno's overbearing father. As with Rope, there was a homosexual subtext to the two men's relationship, although it was toned down from Patricia Highsmith's 1950 original novel. Granger and Walker, whose wife Jennifer Jones had recently left him for David O. Selznick, became close friends and confidantes during filming, and Granger was devastated when Walker died from an accidental combination of alcohol and barbiturates prior to the film's release. It proved to be a box office hit, the first major success of Granger's career, and his "happiest filmmaking experience".

On December 31, 1950, Granger picked up close friend Shelley Winters to escort her to Sam Spiegel's traditional New Year's Eve gala. The actress kept him waiting for nearly two hours, and they argued while en route to the party. Once there, they went their separate ways, and Granger met Ava Gardner. The two left to hear Nat King Cole perform at a nearby nightclub and then went to Granger's home, where they began an intense affair that lasted until Gardner began filming Show Boat a month later.

Having reconciled, Granger and Winters went to New York City, where they audited classes at the Actors Studio and the Neighborhood Playhouse School of the Theatre. Winters subscribed to the concept of method acting, but Granger felt an actor "had to be faithful to the text, not adapt it to some personal sense memory", and their disagreement triggered more arguments. Their plan to pursue individual training programs was disrupted when both were called back to Hollywood. Goldwyn cast Granger in I Want You, a 1951 drama about the effect the Korean War has on an American family still trying to recover from World War II. Granger thought the screenplay by Irwin Shaw was "not only dull, but felt dated", but welcomed the opportunity to work with Dana Andrews and Dorothy McGuire. Goldwyn expected the film to be as successful as The Best Years of Our Lives (1946), but it proved to be as "tepid and old-fashioned" as Granger feared and, opening after cease-fire negotiations with Korea had begun, no longer topical, and it died at the box office. His subsequent projects – a screwball comedy with Winters called Behave Yourself! (1951), and the Gift of the Magi segment of the anthology film O. Henry's Full House (1952) – were no more successful. During the filming of the latter, he appeared on set in a Camel commercial. The following musical film, Hans Christian Andersen (1952), with Danny Kaye, on the other hand, did well internationally at the box office.

Eager to work with Vincente Minnelli, Granger accepted a role opposite Leslie Caron and Ethel Barrymore in Mademoiselle, one of three segments in the 1953 MGM film The Story of Three Loves. The film's producer, Gottfried Reinhardt, also directed the other two segments, and he mercilessly edited Mademoiselle to give his stories more screen time. Unhappy with the direction his career was taking, Granger sought solace with Shelley Winters, who was separated from Vittorio Gassman, and the two friends resumed their love affair, which at one point nearly had culminated in marriage. Their relationship was complicated, but Granger felt "it works for us."

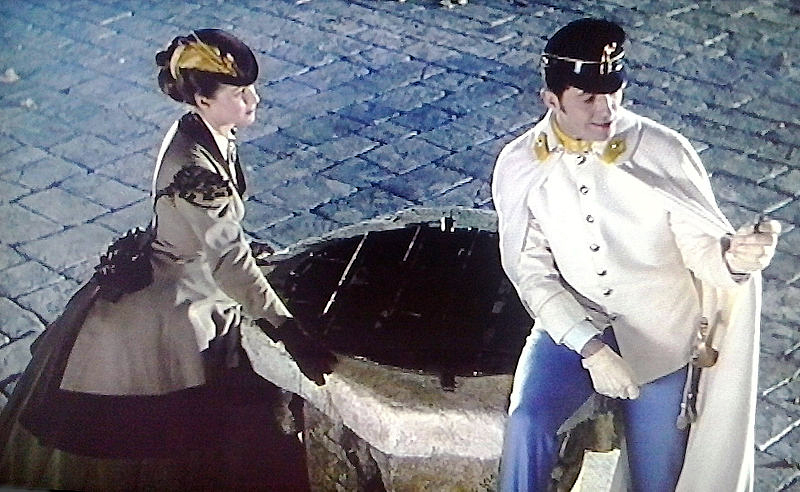
Scene with Alida Valli in the film Senso, 1954

Granger's next project was Small Town Girl (1953), a musical with Jane Powell, Ann Miller, and Bobby Van. Upon its completion, he bought his release from Goldwyn, a costly decision that left him with serious financial difficulties. Granger was determined to move to Manhattan to study acting and perform on stage, but his agent convinced him to accept a role in Senso (1954), directed by Luchino Visconti and co-starring Alida Valli. Filming in Italy lasted nine months, although Granger frequently was idle during this period, allowing him free time to explore Italy and even spend a long weekend in Paris, where he had a brief affair with Jean Marais. During his time in Venice, Granger renewed his friendship with Peggy Guggenheim, whom he had met during his earlier trip to Italy with Arthur Laurents, and he met Mike Todd, who cajoled him into making a cameo appearance as a gondolier in his 1956 epic Around the World in 80 Days. He finally returned to Hollywood exhausted, but happy about the experience.

Upon his return to the States, Darryl F. Zanuck offered Granger a two-picture deal, and in quick succession he made The Girl in the Red Velvet Swing co-starring Ray Milland and Joan Collins, in which he portrayed tycoon Harry Kendall Thaw, and The Naked Street, a melodrama the actor thought was "preachy, trite and pedestrian", although he welcomed the opportunity to work with Anthony Quinn and Anne Bancroft. Both films were released in 1955.

The same year, Granger moved to New York and began studying with Bob Fosse, Gloria Vanderbilt, James Kirkwood, and Tom Tryon in a class taught by Sandy Meisner at the Neighborhood Playhouse. During this period, he made his Broadway debut in The Carefree Tree, a play with music based on an old Chinese legend. The cast included Janice Rule as Granger's love interest, and Alvin Ailey, Frances Sternhagen, Jerry Stiller, and Sada Thompson in supporting roles. The play closed after only 24 performances, but shortly after its demise, Rule moved in with Granger, and before long they were making wedding plans. They gradually realized the love their characters had felt on stage actually had not carried over into real life, and the two went their separate ways, although they remained friends until her death in 2003.

With both his film and theatrical career floundering, Granger turned to television. His dramatic TV debut came when he appeared in "Splendid With Swords", an episode of Schlitz Playhouse of Stars in 1955. He starred in Beyond This Place (1957), an adaptation of the A.J. Cronin 1950 novel of the same title, with Shelley Winters and Peggy Ann Garner, and joined Julie Harris for a 1961 remake of The Heiress (1949). He also was featured in episodes of Climax Mystery Theater, Ford Television Theatre, The 20th Century Fox Hour, Robert Montgomery Presents, Playhouse 90, Wagon Train, Kraft Television Theatre, The United States Steel Hour, and The Bell Telephone Hour, and in later years Get Smart, Run for Your Life, Ironside, The Name of the Game, and Hawaii Five-O, among others.

In 1959, Granger returned to Broadway as Fitzwilliam Darcy opposite Polly Bergen as Elizabeth Bennet in First Impressions, a musical adaptation of Pride and Prejudice with a book and direction by Abe Burrows. The tryout in New Haven was a disaster, and reviews were mixed. Things improved slightly during the Philadelphia run, but by the time the production reached New York, Bergen – who was fighting bitterly with co-star Hermione Gingold – was experiencing serious vocal problems, and some of her songs would be cut during each performance, creating confusion for the rest of the cast. Only two of seven critics wrote favorable reviews, Bergen was replaced by understudy Ellen Hanley, and the musical closed in less than three months. Later that year, he was cast in The Warm Peninsula, a play by Joe Masteroff. Co-starring Julie Harris, June Havoc, and Larry Hagman, it received fair reviews but closed after only 86 performances.

== Later career ==
Despite his three unsuccessful Broadway experiences, Granger continued to focus on theater in the early 1960s. He accepted an invitation from Eva Le Gallienne to join her National Repertory Theatre. During their first season, while the company was in Philadelphia, John F. Kennedy was assassinated. The President had attended NRT's opening night and post-performance gala in the nation's capital, so the news hit everyone in the company especially hard. Granger had become a close friend of production supervisor Robert Calhoun, and although both had felt a mutual attraction, they never had discussed it. That night they became lovers.

Granger finally achieved some success on Broadway in The Seagull, The Crucible, The Glass Menagerie, and Deathtrap. He starred opposite Barbara Cook in a revival of The King and I at the off-Broadway New York City Center, and in 1979 he was cast in the Roundabout Theatre Company production of A Month in the Country. In 1986 he won the Obie Award for his performance in the Lanford Wilson play Talley & Son.

In the early 1970s, Granger and Calhoun moved to Rome, where the actor made a series of Italian language films, most notably the Spaghetti Western They Call Me Trinity (1970) and the giallo film What Have They Done to Your Daughters? (1974), alongside Mario Adorf, which was directed by Massimo Dallamano. He appeared in an episode of the ABC police drama Nakia in 1974 and also appeared on several soap operas, including One Life to Live in 1976, on which his portrayal of Will Vernon garnered him a nomination for the Daytime Emmy Award for Outstanding Lead Actor in a Drama Series, The Edge of Night in 1979, and As the World Turns in 1987–1988, produced by Calhoun.

Later he appeared in several documentaries discussing Hollywood in general and Alfred Hitchcock in particular. In 1995, he was interviewed on camera for The Celluloid Closet, discussing the depiction of homosexuality in film and the use of subtext in various films, including his own.

In 2003, Granger made his last film appearance in the documentary Broadway: The Golden Age, by the Legends Who Were There. In it, he tells the story of leaving Hollywood at the peak of his fame, buying out his contract from Samuel Goldwyn, and moving to Manhattan to work on the Broadway stage.

In 2007, Granger published the memoir Include Me Out, co-written with domestic partner Robert Calhoun (November 24, 1930 – May 24, 2008). In the book, named after one of Goldwyn's famous malapropisms, he freely discusses his career and personal life.

== Death ==
Granger died of natural causes in his Manhattan apartment on March 27, 2011, at age 85. His body was cremated and his ashes given to family after a service at The Riverside restaurant.

== Legacy ==
For his contribution to television, Granger has a star located at 1551 Vine Street on the Hollywood Walk of Fame.

== Filmography ==
Year	Film	Role	Director(s)	Notes
1943	The North Star	Damian Simonov	Lewis Milestone	
1944	The Purple Heart	Sgt. Howard Clinton	Lewis Milestone	
1948	They Live by Night	Arthur "Bowie" Bowers	Nicholas Ray	
1948	Rope	Phillip Morgan	Alfred Hitchcock	
1948	Enchantment	Pilot Officer Pax Masterson	Irving Reis	
1949	Roseanna McCoy	Johnse Hatfield	Irving Reis	
1950	Side Street	Joe Norson	Anthony Mann	
1950	Our Very Own	Chuck	David Miller	
1950	Edge of Doom	Martin Lynn	Mark Robson	
1951	Strangers on a Train	Guy Haines	Alfred Hitchcock	
1951	Behave Yourself!	William Calhoun 'Bill' Denny	George Beck	
1951	I Want You	Jack Greer	Mark Robson	
1952	O. Henry's Full House	Jim Young	Henry King	Segment: "The Gift of the Magi"
1952	Hans Christian Andersen	Niels	Charles Vidor	
1953	The Story of Three Loves	Thomas Clayton Campbell Jr.	Gottfried Reinhardt	Segment: "Mademoiselle"
1953	Small Town Girl	Rick Belrow Livingston	László Kardos	
1954	Senso	Lieutenant Franz Mahler	Luchino Visconti	
1955	The Naked Street	Nicholas 'Nicky' Bradna	Maxwell Shane	
1955	The Girl in the Red Velvet Swing	Harry Kendall Thaw	Richard Fleischer	
1968	Laura	Shelby Carpenter	John Llewellyn Moxey	Television film
1968	Rogue's Gallery	Edmund Van Dermot	Leonard Horn	
1970	They Call Me Trinity	Major Harriman	Enzo Barboni	
1970	The Challengers	Nealy (Casino Manager)	Leslie H. Martinson	Television film
1971	Something Creeping in The Dark	Spike	Mario Colucci	
1972	Amuck!	Richard Stuart	Silvio Amadio	
1972	The Red Headed Corpse	John Ward	Renzo Russo	
1972	So Sweet, So Dead	Inspector Capuana	Roberto Bianchi Montero	
1972	Planet Venus	The Soldier		
1973	Night Flight from Moscow	Computer Programming Director	Henri Verneuil	
1973	The Man Called Noon	Judge Niland	Peter Collinson	
1973	Kill Me, My Love!	Manny Baxter		
1973	Arnold	Evan Lyons	Georg Fenady	
1974	What Have They Done to Your Daughters?	Mr. Polvesi	Massimo Dallamano	
1974	Death Will Have Your Eyes	Armando		
1975	The Lives of Jenny Dolan	David Ames	Jerry Jameson	Television film
1976	Widow	Martin Caine	J. Lee Thompson	Television film
1981	The Prowler	Sheriff George Fraser	Joseph Zito	
1984	Death Mask	Douglas Andrews		
1986	The Imagemaker	Ambassador Hoyle	Hal Weiner	
1986	The Whoopee Boys	Extra (uncredited)	John Byrum	
1986	Very Close Quarters	Pavel		
1987	Guerilla Strike Force	Santos	Jerry Hopper	
1995	The Celluloid Closet	Himself	Rob Epstein and Jeffrey Friedman	Documentary film
2001	The Next Big Thing	Arthur Pomposello	P.J. Posner	Final film role
2003	Broadway: The Golden Age	Himself	Rick McKay	Documentary film
