= Heshmat Tabarzadi =

Iranian activist (born 1959)

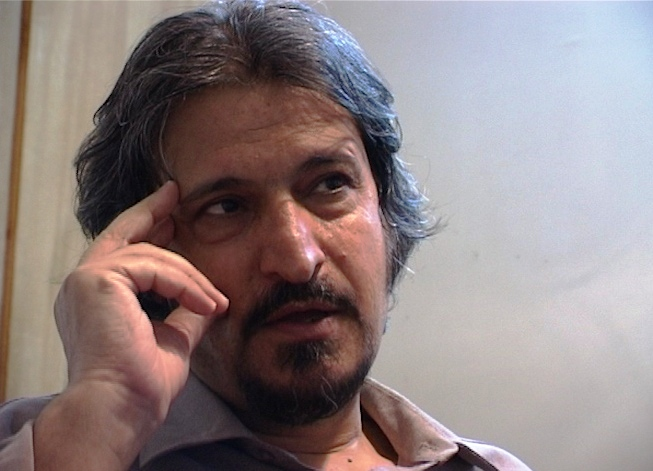
- Born: Heshmat Tabarzadi; March 21, 1959 (age 67); Golpayegan, Imperial State of Iran
- Occupations: Journalist; Political activist
- Title: Secretary General of the Democratic Front of Iran

Heshmatollah Tabarzadi (Persian: حشمت‌الله طبرزدی; born March 21, 1959) is an Iranian democratic activist. Tabarzadi has been arrested several times on charges related to his political activities, most recently in December 2009. In October 2010, a court sentenced him to nine additional years in jail and 74 lashes, a sentence that was reduced to eight years on appeal.

== Political activities ==
Tabarzadi served as the leader of the banned opposition group, the Democratic Front of Iran. Tabarzadi was viewed by the government as one of the leaders of the student protests of July 9, 1999. He was arrested and spent nine years in Evin Prison, including two in solitary confinement, for his activities as a student leader.

Following the December 7, 2009 Student Day protests in Iran, Tabarzadi published an opinion piece in the Wall Street Journal, writing, "One thing is certain: Dec. 7 proved that the movement for a free, democratic Iran is robust and only growing in strength. If the government continues to opt for violence, there very well may be another revolution in Iran. One side has to step down. And that side is the government—-not the people."

On the evening of December 27, the day of the 2009 Ashura protests, Tabarzadi was interviewed on Voice of America Persian, stating that the protests were the largest he had ever seen. He also called on protesters to keep the protests nonviolent.

== 2009 Arrest ==
Iranian law enforcement arrested Tabarzadi at his home on December 28, 2009, the day after the Ashura protests. Government agents also seized his books, papers and computer. Initially, Tabarzadi was held in the political ward 209 of Tehran's Evin Prison. After protesting the execution of five Kurdish activists, he was transferred to Rajaeeshahr prison.

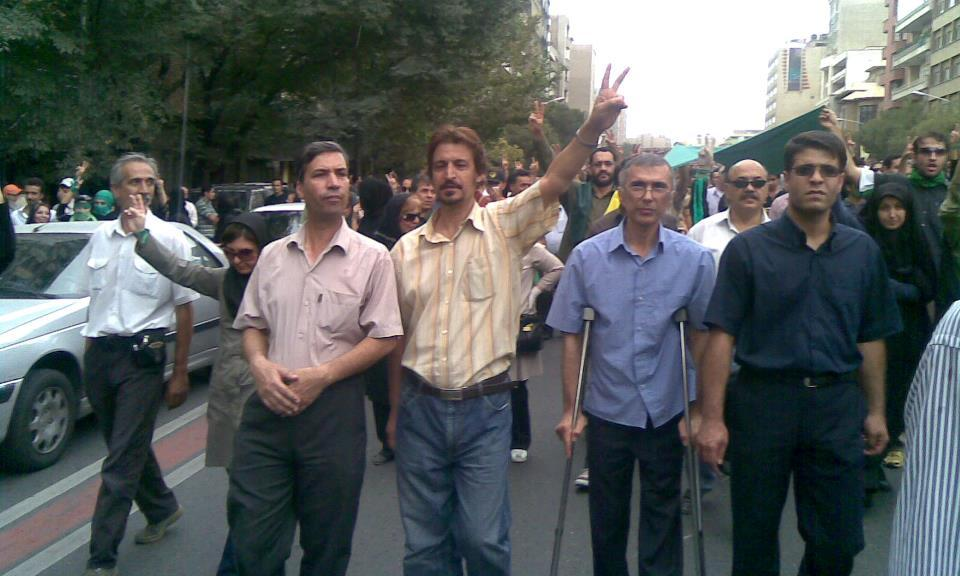
"Heshmatollah Tabarzadi at a rally to protect elections result in Iran. Tabarzadi raised his finger to signal victory in this photo, Tehran, September 2009.

=== Sentencing ===
In October 2010, Tabarzadi was convicted of five charges: “insulting the Leader”, “insulting the President”, “propaganda against the system”, “gathering and colluding with intent to harm state security”, and “disturbing public order”. A Tehran revolutionary court sentenced Tabardazi to nine years in jail and 74 lashes; he was also banned from participating in "social activities" for ten years. On appeal, this sentence was reduced to eight years of imprisonment, and the flogging was removed from the sentence. Following the trial, three of Tabarzadi's lawyers were themselves sentenced to prison terms for opposition to the government: Nasrin Sotoudeh, Mohammad Oliyaeifard, and Khalil Bahramian.

Amnesty International considers Tabarzadi a prisoner of conscience, and has repeatedly called for his immediate release.

While on temporary leave from prison with the condition of remaining silent, he called for a campaign against executions and to free political prisoners in Iran. Shortly after on January 6, 2014 he was called to report back to prison, which he refused calling it "oppression and bullying" and instead chose "civil disobedience". Mr. Tabarzadi was arrested at noon on January 15, 2014 by three security officials of the Islamic Republic of Iran.
