= Mehraveh Khandan =

Iranian student and activist

Mehraveh Khandan (Persian: مهراوه خندان; born c. 2000) is an Iranian fine arts student and human rights advocate. She is known for her public support of her parents, who are civil rights activists Nasrin Sotoudeh and Reza Khandan, during a time of strict government control in Iran.

== Early life ==
Mehraveh Khandan was born around 2000, the daughter of two human rights defenders, Nasrin Sotoudeh and Reza Khandan. She has a younger brother, Nima. At the age of 12 and again at 17, she was banned from leaving the country.

== Activism ==
Mehraveh was arrested at her home in Tehran on 17 August 2020 aged 20, charged with "insult and assault". A team of five Intelligence Ministry and judiciary agents arrived in three cars at the family home, raided the house when she was home with her father Reza Khandan, and arrested Mehraveh. According to Reza, the charges relate to a verbal argument with a female prison guard a year earlier, when visiting her mother, Nasrin Sotoudeh, in Evin Prison. The guard had apparently felt insulted and lodged a complaint against Mehraveh. Reza said that her arrest was meant as a means of pressure on her family; it took place a few days after her mother had announced her hunger strike in demand for release of political prisoners.

The Twelve-Day War between Iran and Israel broke out in June 2025, while her father was serving a 4-year and 1-month sentence in Evin Prison, located in District 3 in Tehran. This area became known worldwide after Israel and president Trump called for evacuation of the area, as it was to be targeted by bombing. Mehraveh, in an attempt to help her imprisoned father, posted an Instagram video that went viral, asking for international help to release him. She felt this was the only way to reach out for help and was quoted as saying: "The Islamic Republic regime has shown in times of crisis, it only resorts to increasing internal repression, but I hope this time they react to international pressure differently".

== Personal life ==
As of June 2025, Khandan was a fine arts student in Amsterdam.
