= Broadway: The Golden Age, by the Legends Who Were There =

Broadway: The Golden Age
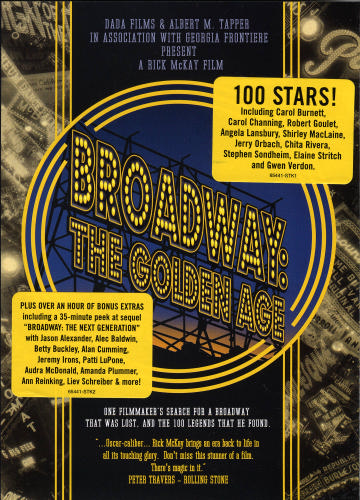
- Directed by: Rick McKay
- Written by: Rick McKay
- Produced by: Rick McKay; Albert M. Tapper; Jamie deRoy; Anne L. Bernstein
- Cinematography: Rick McKay
- Edited by: Rick McKay
- Music by: Various
- Distributed by: PBS; RCA; BMG
- Release dates: April 2003 (Palm Beach International Film Festival); June 11, 2004 (United States)
- Running time: 111 minutes
- Language: English

Broadway: The Golden Age is a 2003 documentary film by Rick McKay, telling the story of the "golden age" of Broadway by the oral history of the legendary actors of the 1940s and 1950s, incorporating rare lost footage of actual performances and never-before-seen personal home movies and photos. This was the final film Sally Ann Howes starred in before her death in 2021.

== Subjects ==
The film includes interviews (filmed over a span of six years) with the following people:

- Edie Adams
- Beatrice Arthur
- Elizabeth Ashley
- Alec Baldwin
- Kaye Ballard
- Bryan Batt
- Betsy Blair
- Tom Bosley
- Carol Burnett
- Kitty Carlisle
- Carol Channing
- Betty Comden
- Barbara Cook
- Carole Cook
- Hume Cronyn
- Arlene Dahl
- Charles Durning
- Daisy Eagan
- Fred Ebb
- Nanette Fabray
- Cy Feuer
- Bonnie Franklin
- Betty Garrett
- Ben Gazzara
- Robert Goulet
- Farley Granger
- Tammy Grimes
- Uta Hagen
- Sheldon Harnick
- Julie Harris
- Rosemary Harris
- June Havoc
- Ruthie Henshall
- Jerry Herman
- Al Hirschfeld
- Celeste Holm
- Sally Ann Howes
- Kim Hunter
- Jeremy Irons
- Anne Jackson
- Derek Jacobi
- Simon Jones
- Lainie Kazan
- John Kenley
- Michael John LaChiusa
- Martin Landau
- Frank Langella
- Angela Lansbury
- Arthur Laurents
- Carol Lawrence
- Michele Lee
- Hal Linden
- Cameron Mackintosh
- Shirley MacLaine
- Karl Malden
- Donna McKechnie
- Ann Miller
- Liliane Montevecchi
- Patricia Morison
- Robert Morse
- James Naughton
- Patricia Neal
- Phyllis Newman
- The Nicholas Brothers
- Jerry Orbach
- Janis Paige
- Amanda Plummer
- Jane Powell
- Hal Prince
- John Raitt
- Lee Roy Reams
- Rex Reed
- Charles Nelson Reilly
- Diana Rigg
- Chita Rivera
- Joan Roberts
- Tony Roberts
- Mary Rodgers
- Gena Rowlands
- Eva Marie Saint
- Marian Seldes
- Vincent Sherman
- Douglas Sills
- Stephen Sondheim
- Maureen Stapleton
- Elaine Stritch
- Mary Testa
- Tommy Tune
- Leslie Uggams
- Gwen Verdon
- Eli Wallach
- Thommie Walsh
- Wendy Wasserstein
- Fay Wray
- Gretchen Wyler
- Karen Ziemba

The intrinsic value of the documentary as a historical record is underscored by the fact that seven of the interviewees (Hume Cronyn, Uta Hagen, Al Hirschfeld, Kim Hunter, Ann Miller, Harold Nicholas and Gwen Verdon) died before the film was released in June 2004, and another 63 interviewees have died since then (as of September 2026).

Following McKay's own death in 2018, filmmaker Michael Stever shared some noteworthy recollections of his time as McKay's UPM for more than three years.

== Reception ==
Broadway: The Golden Age won the Audience Award for Best Documentary at the Palm Beach International Film Festival, the Audience Choice Award for Best documentary at the Santa Barbara International Film Festival, and the Audience Award and Festival Award at the San Diego Film Festival, both for Best Documentary.

In 2006, McKay was honored with a Special Award for his work on the film by the New England Theatre Conference with the New England Theatre Conference Special Contribution to Theatre Award.

On review aggregator website Rotten Tomatoes, the film holds an approval rating of 83% based on 46 reviews, with an average rating of 7.1/10.

== Sequel ==
A sequel by the name of Broadway: Beyond the Golden Age had been in development since the release of the original documentary. McKay successfully funded a Kickstarter campaign in 2017 to help get the film completed, but his death in 2018 made its future uncertain. It premiered August 14, 2021 on PBS as part of Great Performances.
