= The State of Marriage =

- Directed by: Jeff Kaufman
- Written by: Jeff Kaufman
- Produced by: Jeff Kaufman; Marcia Ross
- Starring: Mary Bonauto; Susan Murray; Beth Robinson
- Cinematography: Daniel Kaufman
- Edited by: Asher Bingham
- Music by: Laura Karpman; Nora Kroll-Rosenbaum
- Production company: Floating World Pictures
- Release date: June 18, 2015 (PIFF)
- Running time: 82 minutes
- Country: United States
- Language: English

The State of Marriage is a 2015 documentary film about the origins of the marriage equality movement, focusing on the decades of grassroots advocacy by lawyers Mary Bonauto, Susan Murray, and Beth Robinson and the 1999 Vermont Supreme Court case Baker v. Vermont. The film had its world premiere at the 2015 Provincetown International Film Festival on 18 June 2015. It is written and directed by Jeff Kaufman, and produced by Kaufman and Marcia Ross. Funding for the film's post-production and editing work was partially raised through a successful Indiegogo crowdfunding campaign.

== Background ==
The film depicts the decades-long battle for marriage equality, beginning in Vermont in the 1990s. In 1997, Bonauto, a lawyer at Gay & Lesbian Advocates & Defenders (GLAD), joined forces with two local attorneys, Murray and Robinson, to file a lawsuit against the State of Vermont on behalf of three same-sex couples, Stan Baker and Peter Harrigan, Lois Farnham and Holly Puterbaugh, and Nina Beck and Stacy Jolles. The suit, Baker v. Vermont, ignited state- and nationwide controversy, but eventually resulted in a 1999 State Supreme Court victory and the passage of Civil Unions in 2000, which gave gay and lesbian couples the rights of marriage but not the name. Still, the bill was a national first, and paved the way for gay marriage initiatives in other states, as well as the passage of full same-sex marriage rights in Vermont in 2009.

Kaufman was a radio host in Vermont during the initial legal battle, and witnessing the events unfold inspired the creation of the documentary. The film was shot in Vermont between July 2013 and February 2014.

== Cast ==
- Jeffrey Amestoy
- Stan Baker
- Nina Beck
- Rev. Craig Bensen
- Mary Bonauto
- Mark Candon
- Steve Cable
- Sherry Corbin
- Howard Dean
- Diane Derby
- Ruth Dwyer
- John Edwards
- Kevin Ellis
- Pat Fagan
- Lois Farnham
- Peter Harrigan
- Eve Jacobs-Carnahan
- Stacy Jolles
- Rep. John Lewis
- Bill Lippert
- Tom Little
- Marion Milne
- David Moats
- Susan Murray
- Holly Puterbaugh
- Beth Robinson
- Marty Rouse
- Peter Shumlin
- Shap Smith
- Ross Sneyd
- Evan Wolfson

== Reception ==
The Hollywood Reporter gave The State of Marriage a favorable review, calling it an "indispensable addition to the filmed history of the marriage equality movement".
