= Super Force =

American action-adventure TV series

- Genre: Action; Adventure; Science fiction
- Created by: James J. McNamara
- Starring: Ken Olandt; Larry B. Scott; Patrick Macnee; Lisa Niemi; Musetta Vander; Antoni Corone; R. Emmett Fitzsimmons; Marc Macaulay; Tom Kouchalakos; G. Gordon Liddy
- Music by: Kevin Kiner; Joel Goldsmith; Greg Adams; Jim McGrath
- Country of origin: United States
- No. of episodes: 48

Production
- Executive producers: James J. McNamara (Season 1); Roderick Taylor (Season 2)
- Producer: Michael Attanasio
- Production location: Orlando, Florida
- Cinematography: Tom Jewett; Michael McGowan
- Editors: Gaston Santiso; Gary Blair; John Elias
- Running time: ~30 minutes
- Production companies: Premiere Limited Productions; Viacom Enterprises

Original release
- Network: First-run syndication
- Release: October 5, 1990 – May 26, 1992

Super Force is an American action-adventure TV series which aired from October 1990 to May 1992.

The series is about a former astronaut turned cop who uses a highly advanced powered exoskeleton and motorcycle to fight crime in the city of Metroplex during the then future year of 2020. Among the features of the black battle suit were enhanced strength and armament and a force field that protected the wearer from virtually all known weapons, whereas the motorcycle had an array of James Bond-type gadgets and weapons.

Syndicated by Viacom, Super Force was designed to be a companion series to Superboy, and the second series in a proposed two-hour block of action programming that also included Lightning Force. Unusual for a series that only ran 30 minutes per episode, Super Force debuted with a two-hour TV pilot film, which was later split into four episodes for syndication purposes.

== Plot summary ==
Ken Olandt as Zach Stone / Super Force

Astronaut Zachary Stone (Ken Olandt) returns from his acclaimed deep-space mission to Mars to find that his father is dead and that his police detective brother Frank (Marshall R. Teague) is missing, presumed murdered and falsely accused of being a crooked cop due to fabricated computer evidence. Frustrated at the seeming lack of concern or progress by the authorities, Zach takes it upon himself to find those responsible and bring them to justice, joining the Metroplex Police Department as a detective under precinct captain Carla Frost (Lisa Niemi).

After his first failed attempt almost leads to his death in Metroplex's aptly named "Crime Zone", Zach meets F.X. Spinner (Larry B. Scott), a research scientist at Hungerford Industries who has developed a prototype suit of space armor that was never put into production due to lack of government funding. After the murder of Hungerford Industries founder E.B. Hungerford (Patrick Macnee), a close friend of the Stone family, Zach convinces F.X. to modify the suit for urban warfare purposes.

Combining the armor with an experimental heavily armed, jet-propelled motorcycle, the two form the backbone of the vigilantism crime-fighting team called "Super Force", ably assisted by the Hungerford Computer (voiced by Macnee), an artificial intelligence supercomputer created from a blend of Hungerford's personal records, psychological profile and company files to convince the world that the brilliant and charming but somewhat reclusive British billionaire scientist is still alive so that his company would not fall into the wrong hands.

During Season Two, Zach added enhanced strength, intelligence, and senses, as well as a limited form of extrasensory perception to his crime-fighting repertoire, the result of a neural link with the computerized Hungerford and his near-death experience in the final episode of Season One. Also joining the Super Force team that season was Esper Division police officer Zander Tyler (Musetta Vander).

The RoboCop-inspired Super Force suit, motorcycle, and nightstick were designed and built by Robert Short, the special effects expert who also created the red superhero suit worn by John Wesley Shipp in the 1990 live-action TV series The Flash.

Satori, a recurring villain in Season One, was played by G. Gordon Liddy, the man famous for planning the Watergate scandal break-in. Other guest stars included LSD guru Timothy Leary and former adult film stars Traci Lords and Ginger Lynn.

== Characters ==
=== Heroes ===
- Zach Stone – the main protagonist, Zach is a former astronaut, the tough-talking, wisecracking Zach has taken his (supposedly) deceased brother's place on the police force. Due to the increasingly violent crimes and the slow progress of police work however, Zach secretly takes on the role of the armored vigilante Super Force. As Super Force, Zach's armor increases his physical strength, surrounds him with a force field generated by a built-in graviton-powered electrokinetic deflector system, allows him to see at telescopic ranges, and fires a laser from the visual enhancement device on the samurai-style helmet. Among other weapons, the suit comes with a special high-tech baton that, in addition to its regular club-like function, shoots energy blasts, grappling hook, tracking devices, and even a fire retardant spray. In the second season, in addition to becoming four times stronger than he was before, Zach gains greatly increased powers of perception that include not only minor psychic abilities, but also a limited form of X-ray vision, which allows him to see into the infrared and ultraviolet ends of the spectrum and detect energy sources through solid barriers. With the addition of these new talents, he now only becomes Super Force when absolutely necessary, and in many Season Two episodes, he does not don his signature armor at all.
- F.X. Spinner – a former gang member given a second chance thanks to Frank Stone and E.B. Hungerford, the black, stylish, glasses-wearing Franklin Xavier Spinner is the techno-genius of the team, using his electronics knowledge to repair and upgrade the suit and create new gadgets as necessary. On occasion, F.X. even ventures into the field himself, including once dressing up in the Super Force armor to free Zach from brainwashing, or going undercover in an amusement park with a dark secret. In the episode "Yo! Super Force!", it is revealed that he has three cousins who also work as undercover agents.
- E.B. Hungerford – the head of Hungerford Industries who had served as both Zach and F.X.'s mentor, E.B. is killed in the first quarter of the pilot film, but he lives on as a pixelated Max Headroom-style computer simulation which has all the knowledge, intelligence, and personality of the original and can instantly access all files in his company's database and just as quickly interface with other computer systems worldwide in search of information. In the episodes "There's a Light"/"At the End of the Tunnel" he sets up a neural link with Zach's brain that helps save his life and allows E.B. to monitor Zach's bio-readings and come to his electronic aid when needed.
- Captain Carla Frost – Zach's beautiful blonde boss during Season One, Captain Frost dresses like a glamorous New Wave model but is a tough, dedicated, no-nonsense cop down to her very core. Frost does not know who Super Force is, but is grateful for any help she can get bringing law and order back to the Crime Zone; she defends his actions both to her superiors and the media. Divorced, Frost used to date Zach's brother Frank before her promotion to captain, and she still believes in his innocence, at one point revealing to Zach that she suspects that Frank might in fact secretly be Super Force.
- Zander Tyler – a skilled psychic in Metroplex Police Department's secret Esper Division, Zander risked her life and sanity to save Zach at the opening of Season Two by mentally drawing him back from the threshold between life and death; they share a special bond throughout the rest of the series. The exotic, dark-haired Zander was called in to help because she had worked with Hungerford before on Project Lazarus, which attempted to transfer a living mind into a computer – research that proved invaluable to E.B.'s own computerized resurrection. With a lively sense of humor and a bit of a flirtatious side, Zander is more sensitive and emotional than the steely Captain Frost due to her ESP, but is just as tough when the chips are down. She finds that she has more in common with Zach and his friends than she does with her more annoyingly "New Age" colleagues in the Esper Division.
- Frank Stone – Zach's older brother and his role model as a police officer. In the eyes of the authorities, Frank Stone Jr. was a good cop gone bad and believed dead. In actuality, he had been investigating Tao Satori only to be kidnapped by the sinister head of Satori International, who set out to destroy the detective's reputation, first by creating an android assassin in his image in the pilot and then by brainwashing Stone himself into becoming one of his warriors. Zach was able to free his brother from Satori's brainwashing, and now Frank works deep undercover armed with his own suit of Super Force armor, letting the world believe that he is still dead as he tries to bring down his family's powerful archenemy. He is more often referred to than seen, and then usually in a flashback to happier days.

=== Villains ===
- Tao Satori – the main villain of the series, the soft-spoken Satori poses as a great international humanitarian, but is secretly a ruthless criminal mastermind. It is because of him that Super Force exists, and several of the show's first season episodes involve an evil plot of his. A mustached and balding white businessman sent to prison for a savings and loan association by Zach's father, Satori reinvented himself by living a quiet and contemplative traditional Japanese lifestyle steeped in Eastern philosophy, all the while secretly weaving the most diabolical schemes for world domination that range from android duplicates to black hole-creating gravity bombs. Respectfully addressed as "Satori-san" in public, Satori's men usually refer to him in private as "oyabun", the Japanese word for "godfather".
- Mink Navarro – a local crime boss who appears in the Season One episode "Water Mania" and is mentioned throughout Season Two.
- The Merkels – not so much villains as comic relief antagonists, the obnoxious, gung-ho Captain Avery Merkel (Antoni Corone) and his brother Francis (Tom Kachalakos) head the SWAT-style Special Police Logistics And Tactics squad and hate the armor-clad hero for interfering with police business and making SPLAT look bad. Dedicated, highly trained officers, and by no means stupid, the brothers are easily distracted by their need for publicity and lack of a love life. Avery is under the mistaken impression that Super Force is a robot.

== Episodes ==
=== Season One ===
"It is the year 2020, and the world has changed. In 2020, times are tough. This man's tougher."

Ep #	Title	Summary
1-4	A Hero's Welcome/ Too Late the Hero	After returning from a two-year mission to Mars, Zach Stone learns of his brother's death, and takes his place on the police force, but this is only the first in a series of events that leads to his becoming the armored vigilante Super Force.
5	Battle Cry	A former soldier (Richard Hatch) targets the witnesses to his wife's murder who failed to come to her aid.
6	As God is My Witness	It is fire and brimstone time when a charismatic religious madman escapes from confinement and starts recruiting teenagers to his criminal crusade.
7-8	U-Gene	A genetically engineered warrior (Lou Ferrigno) prowls the streets, and Zach is forced to work with a German agent to catch him, but there is more to the situation than it seems.
9	Prisoners of Love	Zach and Captain Frost go undercover to find beautiful women abducted by a scientist (Michael Preston) in search of genetic perfection.
10	The Crime Doctor	While on a case, Zach is brainwashed by Dr. Verona (Sarah Douglas) into trying to kill his alter ego, Super Force.
11	The Gauntlet	After a girl witnesses her brother being murdered, Zach tries to keep her safe from the killer.
12	Come Home to Die	F.X.'s old gang is behind several crimes involving a stolen super-weapon, and F.X. tries to handle it on his own.
13-14	Gravity's Rainbow	Zach learns his brother is still alive and is a pawn of Satori.
15	Water Mania	The owner of Zach's favorite childhood water park is threatened by an extortionist armed with a business-crushing monster truck.
16-17	Sins of the Father	Zach upholds a promise he made to protect a young fugitive from a ruthless bounty hunter (Richard Lynch).
18	Of Human Bondage	Super Force fights a pair of female aliens (Traci Lords and Grace Philips) to rescue students (Michael Stever) from becoming specimens in a space zoo.
19	A Hundred Share	It's journalism gone wrong when a TV reporter uses subliminal stimuli to get more viewers.
20-21	Come Under the Way	A love from the past shows her face when Zach investigates a powerful cult.
22	Tales of Future Past	A genetically engineered assassin from the world of tomorrow (Sting) targets Super Force for termination.
23	Yo! Super Force!	A carnival worker (Rex Benson) harbors a dark secret when young women begin vanishing at his park. Luckily, F.X.'s cousins (Doctor Dré, Brian D. Perry, and Tyrone J. Kelsie) have a secret of their own that may help Super Force.
24	Breakfast of Champions	American Gladiators has nothing on the show Zach's infiltrating, which cares more about ratings than its contestants' survival.
25	Carcinoma Angels	A former girlfriend of Zach's brother seeks his help when her biker ex-husband (Don Stroud) gets out of Prisonplex.
26	There's a Light	Zach is injured when his helmet malfunctions, and it is a race against time to save him when F.X. and Hungerford discover they can't take off the suit without killing him.

=== Season Two ===
"Out of the fire of Earth attraction. Beyond the limits of the world where man and machine and spirit unite. Born by the power of lightning into the twenty-first century. It is the end of the beginning. It is the time of Super Force."

Ep #	Title	Summary
1-2	At the End of the Tunnel	A psychic is called in to keep Zach from passing through death's door, while F.X. tries to figure out who sabotaged the suit.
3	Love Slaves from Outer Space	The aliens from "Of Human Bondage" return and must capture Super Force or become the property of a reptilian Business Lord.
4	Light Around the Body	Zander begins having visions of a woman in trouble that lead her into a deadly trap, and Zach must figure out how to use his new psychic abilities to save her.
5	Instant Karma	Crystal (Ginger Lynn) returns as part of another cult, this one exploiting her past-life regression into an ancient Etruscan sage.
6-7	Hank's Back	Super Force protects a country musician recently released from suspended animation by mobsters seeking payment for a fifty-year-old debt.
8	Ghost in the Machine	Zach and Zander investigate the suspicious suicide of a radio psychic and encounter a deadly computer virus that has learned how to infect human brains.
9-10	Made for Each Other	Zach goes back to school when a teacher uses brain implant to program female students into marrying rich men taking her "Wealth Without Guilt" course.
11	Illegal Aliens	Super Force must help the now-reformed aliens from "Of Human Bondage" and "Love Slaves from Outer Space" when an extraterrestrial law enforcer comes after them.
12-13	The Viral Staircase	Now a radical environmentalist, a woman who Zach went through astronaut training with is out to stop a Hungerford Industries researcher, who is secretly creating a deadly biological weapon.
14	The Big Spin	In this change-of-pace episode, after a blow to the head, Zach dreams of Super Force as a sitcom complete with laugh track.
15	The Luddite Crusade	An ambitious young district attorney uses computer-generated evidence, legal under the New Constitution and Amended Bill of Rights, to convince the police commissioner (Timothy Leary) to have Super Force put behind bars.
16	King of the Trees	A prehistoric bog body dug up by archaeologists turns out to not only still be alive, but is actually a hairy humanoid from another dimension named Iau (Kevin Nash).
17	A Rainbow at Midnight	The ghost of a murdered cop haunts his now-homeless partner, and Zach, F.X., and Zander must solve the twenty year old crime to bring them both peace.
18	The Monkey's Breath	The Esper Division's new commanding officer has a dark secret. She is actually an immortal monster who feeds on human cerebrospinal fluid, and she wants to put Zach and Zander on the menu.
19-20	The End of Everything	Artificial humans called Plasmoids must steal a potentially world-destroying molecular machine to survive their planned obsolescence.
21	The Long Journey Home	In a sequel to "King of the Trees", Iau returns still trying to find his way back to his native dimension, with Merkel (Antoni Corone) in pursuit. It only gets worse when the SPLAT squad accidentally injures a dying boy who has befriended the hairy giant.
22	A Hundred Yards a Second	When a bad reaction to a virtual reality device damages his memory, Zach's friends must prevent him from slipping into a death-like coma from which he will never awaken.

== Home media ==
Visual Entertainment Inc. released Super Force – The Complete Series" on DVD in Region 1 on October 12, 2017.

== Critical response ==
The series holds a rating of 6.9 out of 357 reviews on IMDb. On Realgood.com the show holds a score of 59%.
