= Richard C. Ross =

American politician

Member of the New York State Assembly from the 88th district
- In office January 1, 1973 – December 31, 1980
- Preceded by: George E. Van Cott
- Succeeded by: John R. Branca

Personal details
- Born: May 5, 1927 The Bronx, New York City, New York
- Died: March 11, 2012 (aged 84) Indio, California
- Party: Republican
- Spouse: Joan Flug
- Children: 3 including Marcia Ross
- Relatives: Jeff Kaufman (son-in-law)

Richard C. Ross (May 5, 1927 – March 11, 2012) was an American politician who served in the New York State Assembly from the 88th district from 1973 to 1980.

Ross had a wife, Joan (née Flug), and they had three children, casting director Marcia Ross, William Ross, and Andrew Ross. He died on March 11, 2012, in Indio, California at age 84. Services were held at the Riverside Memorial Chapel in Manhattan.
