= The Naked Street =

1955 film by Maxwell Shane

- Theatrical release poster
- Directed by: Maxwell Shane
- Screenplay by: Maxwell Shane; Leo Katcher
- Story by: Leo Katcher
- Produced by: Edward Small
- Starring: Farley Granger; Anthony Quinn; Anne Bancroft
- Cinematography: Floyd Crosby
- Edited by: Grant Whytock
- Music by: Ernest Gold; Emil Newman
- Production company: Edward Small Productions
- Distributed by: United Artists
- Release date: August 1955
- Running time: 84 minutes
- Country: United States
- Language: English

The Naked Street is a 1955 American film noir directed by Maxwell Shane. The drama features Farley Granger, Anthony Quinn and Anne Bancroft in a story about an enforcer who tries to control his sister's life by falsely clearing her boyfriend of murder.

== Plot ==
Phil Regal (Anthony Quinn), a tough racketeer, pulls strings to get his pregnant unmarried sister Rosalie's punk boyfriend, Nicky, out of a death penalty sentence for killing Barricks, so that they can get married. Later, after Rosalie loses the baby and Phil learns that Nicky is cheating on her, the gangster arranges for Nicky to be framed for a murder. Nicky threatens to expose how Phil got Nicky out of the first murder rap. Nicky is executed for the murder. Phil dies while trying to escape the police.

== Cast ==
- Farley Granger as Nicholas 'Nicky' Bradna
- Anthony Quinn as Phil Regal
- Anne Bancroft as Rosalie Regalzyk, Phil's sister
- Peter Graves as Joe McFarland, journalist at New York Chronicle
- Else Neft as Mrs. Regalzyk
- Sara Berner as Millie Swadke
- Jerry Paris as Latzi Franks
- Mario Siletti as Antonio Cardini
- James Flavin as Attorney Michael X. Flanders
- Whit Bissell as District Attorney Blaker
- Joe Turkel as Shimmy
- Joyce Terry as Margie
- Harry Tyler as I. Barricks
- Jerry Hausner as Louie
- Lee van Cleef as Harry Goldisch (uncredited)
- Jeanne Cooper as Evelyn (uncredited)

== Reception ==
When the film was released, The New York Times film critic, Bosley Crowther, panned the film, writing, "The whole spectacle is dismal and uninspiring. The only cheerful thing that occurs is that the sister and wife, played by Anne Bancroft, falls in love with and marries a newspaper man." The Buffalo Evening News praised Quinn, Bancroft, and Granger for their acting, but was critical overall: "If there were not a ribbon of ludicrousness running through its violence and brutality-laden scenes, one could call it vicious." TV Guide rated it 3/5 stars and called it a "solid, fast-paced crime tale".

Farley Granger wrote in his autobiography that he thought the movie was "preachy, trite, and pedestrian," although he welcomed the opportunity to work with Anthony Quinn and Anne Bancroft.

It was shown on the Turner Classic Movies show 'Noir Alley' with Eddie Muller on September 17, 2022.

== See also ==
- List of American films of 1955
