= Nasrin (film) =

- Film release poster
- Directed by: Jeff Kaufman
- Produced by: Jeff Kaufman; Marcia Ross
- Narrated by: Olivia Colman
- Music by: Lynn Ahrens, Stephen Flaherty
- Distributed by: Virgil Films, US; Java Films, International
- Release date: October 1, 2020
- Running time: 92 minutes
- Country: United States
- Languages: English, Persian

Nasrin is a 2020 documentary film written, produced and directed by Jeff Kaufman and produced by Marcia Ross. The film includes the musical score by Tyler Strickland, an original song by Lynn Ahrens and Stephen Flaherty, and musical performance by Angélique Kidjo.

It focuses on Nasrin Sotoudeh, a human rights activist and lawyer in Iran. The world première was at the 2020 GlobeDocs Film Festival.

== Reception ==
Ms. (magazine) launched the trailer for the film, with an article that stated "'Nasrin' is an engaging and immersive portrait of a highly misunderstood country, a rare profile of Iran’s women’s rights movement, and a surprisingly personal connection to a woman who has the potential to make history." The Hollywood Reporter review for the film said "Stirring ... Eye-opening ... Vivid ... Extraordinary. This eye-opening chronicle offers a chance to bring (Nasrin's) story beyond the human rights community to an even larger audience." The New York Times included mention of the film in its editorial, "Because of her inspiring struggle to preserve the rule of law in Iran, ordinary people around the world are following the news to hear her fate. A new movie, "Nasrin", about her fight for women's rights in Iran will ensure that she will not be forgotten."

=== Accolades ===
Nasrin won The Cinema for Peace Award for Women's Empowerment for 2021.
