= Nasrin Sotoudeh =

Human rights female lawyer in Iran

- نسرین ستوده
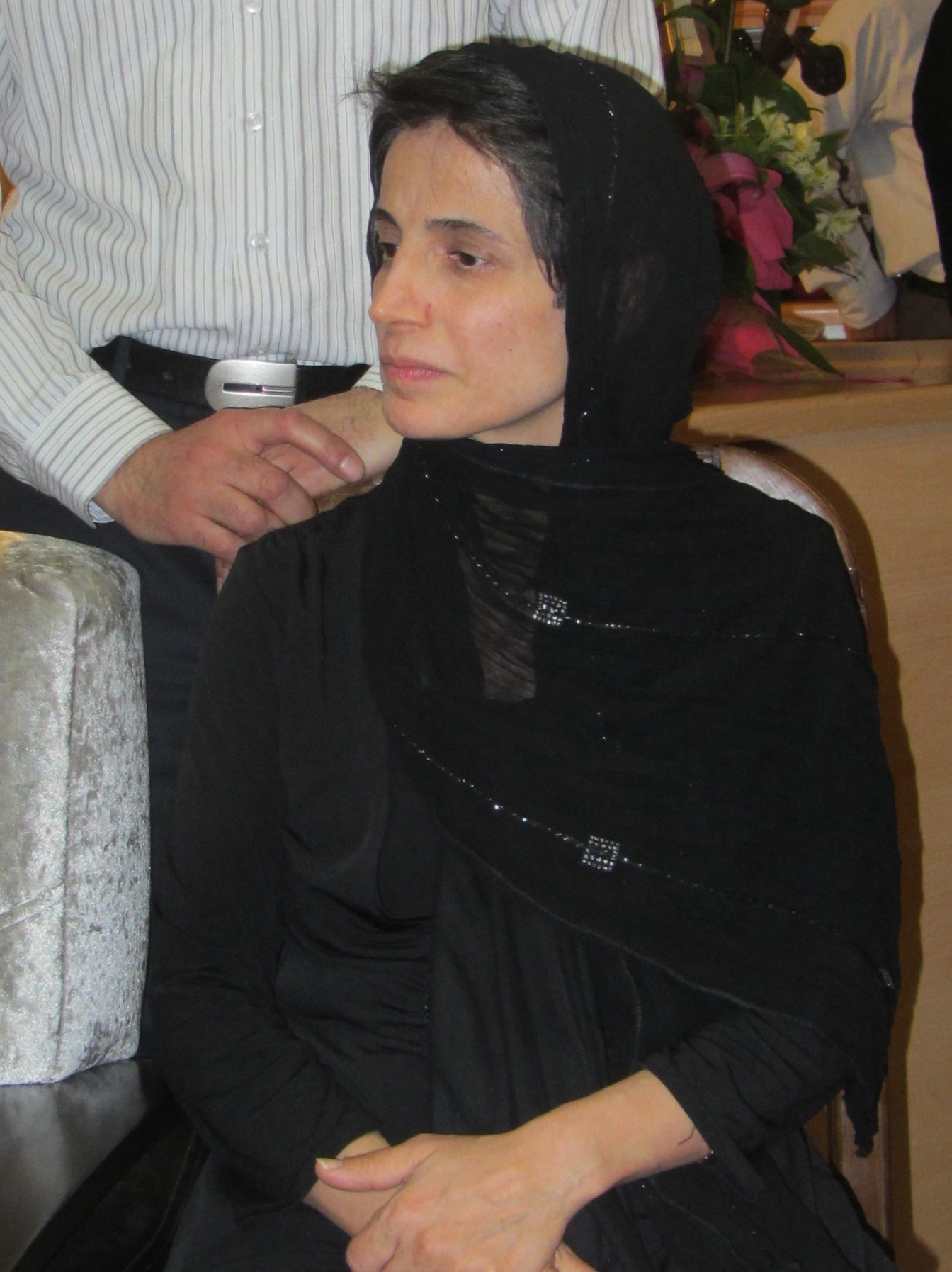
- Born: 1963 (age 62–63); Tehran, Pahlavi Iran
- Education: Master's degree in International Law
- Alma mater: Shahid Beheshti University
- Occupations: Lawyer, human rights activist
- Spouse: Reza Khandan (m. 1995)
- Children: 2, including Mehraveh Khandan
- Awards: Freedom to Write Award (2011); Sakharov Prize (2012); Right Livelihood Award (2020)

Nasrin Sotoudeh Langarudi (Persian: نسرین ستوده لنگرودی; born 1963) is an Iranian human rights lawyer known for her defense of activists, opposition politicians, and individuals facing human rights violations. She has represented Iranian opposition activists and politicians detained after the disputed June 2009 presidential elections and prisoners sentenced to death for crimes committed when they were minors. Her clients have included journalist Isa Saharkhiz, Nobel Peace Prize laureate Shirin Ebadi, and Heshmat Tabarzadi. She has also represented women arrested for appearing in public without a hijab, which is a punishable offense in Iran. Her work has led to several arrests and periods of prison in Iran, and punishment by lashing, the latest being in April 2026, during the 2026 Iran war.

Sotoudeh was the subject of Nasrin, a 2020 documentary filmed in secret in Iran about her life and work.

== Early life and education ==
Nasrin Sotoudeh was born in 1963 in Tehran, Iran, into a "religious, middle-class" Iranian family. Her father is Aghajan Sotoudeh and her mother Safoura Fakhrian.

She had hoped to study philosophy in college and ranked 53rd in the Iranian national university entrance exam, but lacked high enough marks to get a place and ended up studying law at Shahid Beheshti University in Tehran. After completing her master's degree in international law from the university in 1989,

Sotoudeh took and passed the bar exam (Kanoon Vokala) successfully in 1995 but had to wait another eight years to be given her permit to practice law.

== Work and activism ==
In 1991, Sotoudeh, along with some friends, began publishing the monthly magazine Daricheh Goftegoo (Conversation Hatch). She was the only woman on the editorial board. Those involved included religious nationalists as well as secular leftists, with opposition to the hardliners in common, and Sotoudeh oversaw the pages on social developments. However, the editor would not publish the articles she had assembled for International Women's Day in March 1991. She met her future husband, Reza Khandan, while working on the magazine.

In the 1990s she wrote about the rights of political detainees and prisoners, as well as the "chain murders", with dissidents being killed throughout the decade. The more liberal Khatami presidency (1997–2005) allowed a freer press, and Soutoudeh published many articles about women's and children's rights, and other rights under the law in general. In 2000, Supreme Leader Ayatollah Ali Khamenei accused reformist newspapers of being under foreign influence, and two of them were closed down.

Sotoudeh worked closely with Shirin Ebadi and her Defenders of Human Rights Center, after receiving her licence to practice law in 2003. She started her legal career at the Iranian Ministry of Housing legal office and, after two years, joined the legal section of the state-owned Bank Tejarat. During her tenure at the bank, she was "heavily involved with preparing the legal case and the legal arguments for many of the cases that Iran presented at The Hague" in its dispute with the United States during "the Algeria court summons there".

She was an early joiner of the Campaign for One Million Signatures in 2006, dedicated to the abolition of laws that discriminate against Iranian women, and later represented some of its members, such as Nahid Keshavarz and Nasim Khosravi. Her work has also included defending abused children and mothers and working to protect abused children from returning to their abusive fathers. She believes many abusers are ill or past victims of mistreatment and need professional care and medication. She wanted the courts to use child specialists and psychologists in verifying abuse cases to protect innocent children better. In she defended Arash Rahmanipour, who was 17 when he was arrested on charges of moharebeh (warring against God) and plotting to overthrow the regime, and executed in January 2010 at the age of 19. Sotoudeh revealed his poor treatment in prison.

In the period just before the June 2009 presidential elections, Sotoudeh co-founded the Coalition of Women's Rights movement, bringing women's demands to the attention of the candidates. She represented Iranian opposition activists and politicians detained after the disputed presidential elections, as well as prisoners sentenced to death for crimes committed when they were minors. She represented the families of Ahmad Nejati Kargar and Meysam Ebadi, killed by security forces after the 2009 election. Her clients have included journalist Isa Saharkhiz, Nobel Peace Prize laureate Shirin Ebadi, and Heshmat Tabarzadi. She has also represented women arrested for appearing in public without a hijab, which is a punishable offense in Iran. She represented activists and journalists such as Kourosh Zaim, Isa Saharkhiz, Heshmat Tabarzadi, Nahid Keshavarz, Parvin Ardalan, Omid Memarian, and Roya Tolouie, as well as child abuse and criminal cases.

== Arrests and imprisonment ==
=== First arrest ===
In June 2008, along with other female activists preparing to commemorate a national day of solidarity for Iranian women, Sotoudeh was briefly detained. She was tried in February 2009 for disturbing the public and disobeying the police, but was not sentenced.

=== Second arrest and trial ===
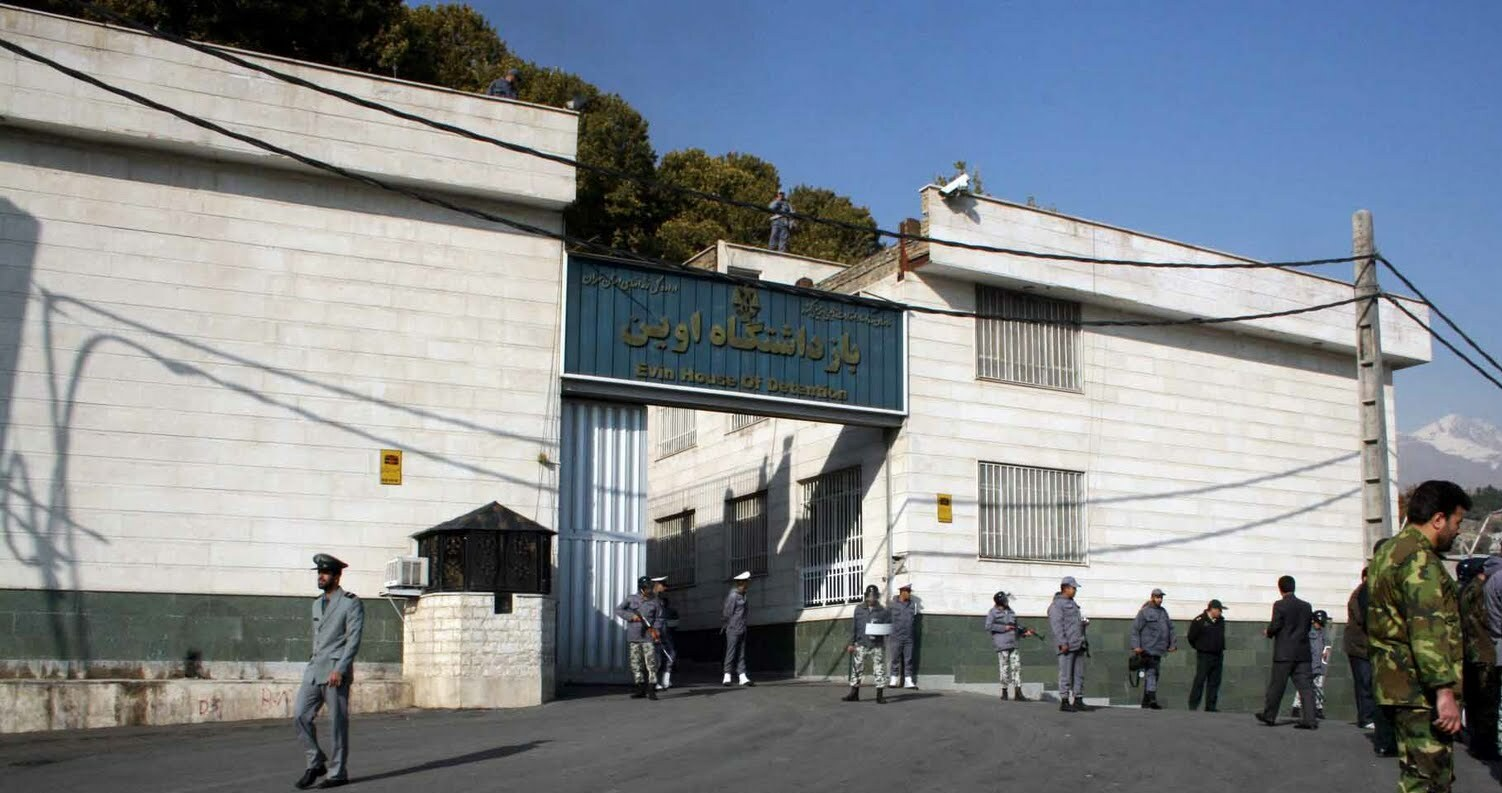
Evin Prison

On 28 August 2010, Iranian authorities raided Sotoudeh's office. At the time, Sotoudeh was representing Zahra Bahrami, a Dutch-Iranian dual citizen charged with security offenses; it was unclear whether the raid was related to Bahrami. The authorities had also been warning her that she would be imprisoned if she continued to represent Shirin Ebadi.

On 4 or 5 September 2010, Iranian authorities arrested Sotoudeh on charges of spreading propaganda and conspiring to harm state security, and she was imprisoned in solitary confinement in Evin Prison. The Washington Post described the arrest as "highlighting an intensifying crackdown on lawyers who defend influential opposition politicians, activists and journalists."

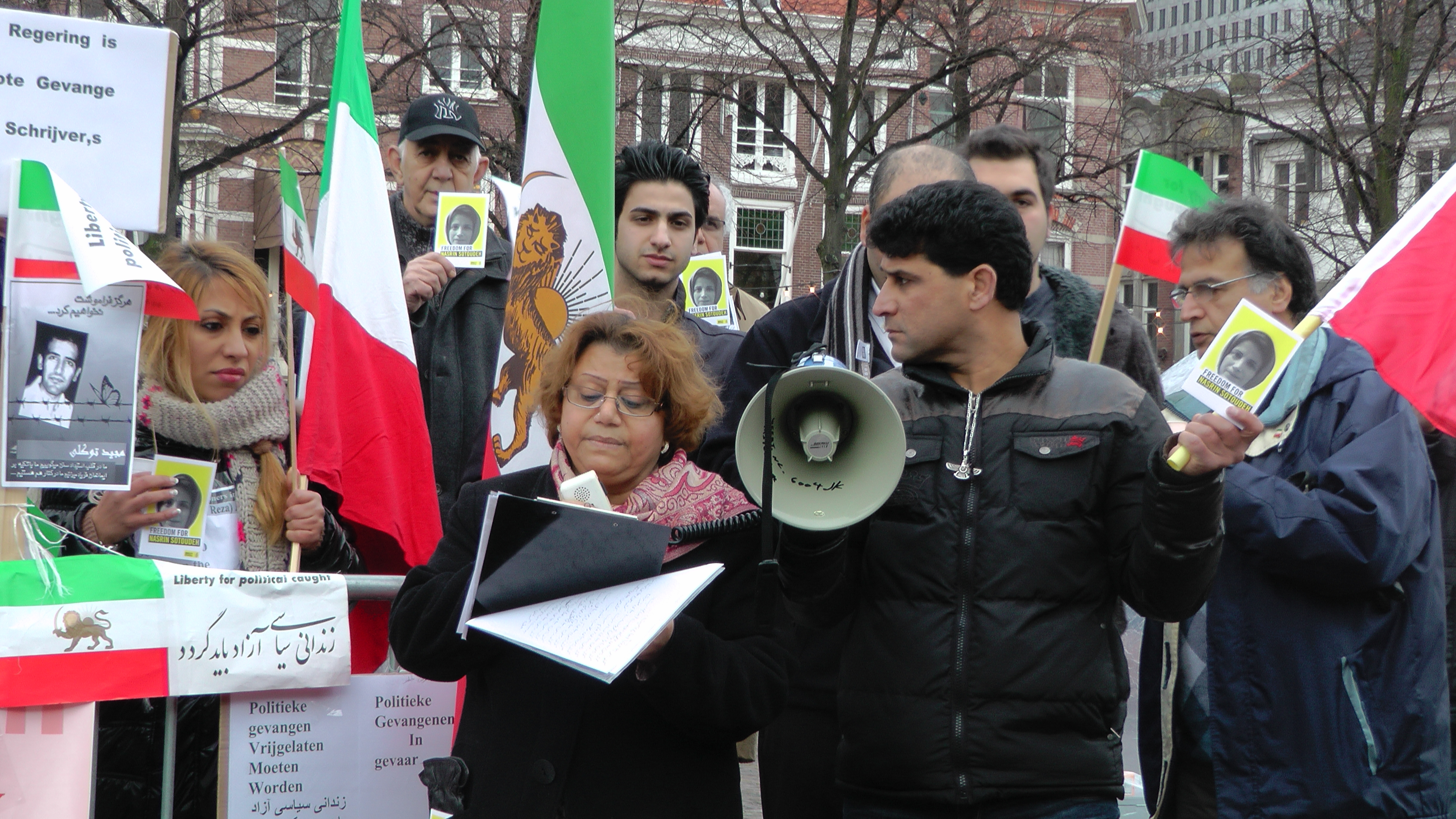
Supporters of Nasrin Sotoudeh demonstrate in The Hague, Netherlands (2012)

Following Sotoudeh's arrest, Shirin Ebadi called for her release and expressed concern regarding her health. In the statement, Ebadi said, "Ms. Sotoudeh is one of the last remaining courageous human rights lawyers who has accepted all risks for defending the victims of human rights violations in Iran". Former Czech President Václav Havel and Zahra Rahnavard, the wife of opposition leader Mir-Hossein Mousavi, also called for Sotoudeh's release.

Amnesty International launched an urgent call for her release, designating her a prisoner of conscience and noting that she was "at risk of torture or other ill-treatment." Sotoudeh, who was imprisoned in Evin Prison, was reportedly held in solitary confinement.

On 9 January 2011, Iranian authorities sentenced Sotoudeh to 11 years in jail for "activities against national security" and "propaganda against the regime." Additionally, she was barred from practicing law and leaving the country for 20 years. In mid-September 2011, an appeals court reduced Sotoudeh's prison sentence to six years; her ban from working as a lawyer was reduced to ten years.

During her period of detention, Sotoudeh went on three hunger strikes.

- On 25 September 2010, she began a hunger strike to protest being denied visits and phone calls from her family. According to her husband, Sotoudeh ended her hunger strike four weeks later, on 23 October.
- On 17 October 2012, Sotoudeh began an indefinite hunger strike to protest new restrictions on her family visits. On the 47th day of strike, her husband stated:
  Now her health condition is so drastic that I don't expect her steady until our next meeting. Dizziness, impaired vision, unsteadiness in walking and low pressure are alarming signs of deterioration, besides the extreme thinness.
  On 4 December 2012 Sotoudeh stopped her hunger strike after 49 days following a short visit of some parliament members at Evin prison where they acknowledged and implemented her requests on lifting her daughter's travel ban.
- On 29 August 2018, Sotoudeh began a hunger strike to protest her detention and government harassment of her family and friends.

==== International response ====
The international community widely condemned Sotoudeh's imprisonment. In October 2010, the International Campaign for Human Rights in Iran, Human Rights Watch, the International Commission of Jurists, the International Federation for Human Rights, the Iranian League for the Defence of Human Rights, the Union Internationale des Avocats and the World Organisation Against Torture joined Amnesty International in a joint statement denouncing Sotoudeh's arrest and calling for her immediate release. The US condemned what it called the "unjust and harsh verdict" against Sotoudeh, and called her "a strong voice for rule of law and justice in Iran". On 20 December 2010, Amnesty International held a day-long protest at the Iranian embassy in London to protest her imprisonment. In January 2011, the Law Society of England and Wales also issued a call for her release.

On 26 October 2012, Sotoudeh was announced as a co-winner of the Sakharov Prize of the European Parliament. She shared the award with Iranian film director Jafar Panahi. European Parliament President Martin Schulz called the pair "a woman and a man who have not been bowed by fear and intimidation and who have decided to put the fate of their country before their own". European Union High Representative of the Union for Foreign Affairs and Security Policy Catherine Ashton stated of the prize, "I am following the case of Nasrin Sotoudeh and other human rights defenders with great concern ... We will continue to campaign for the charges against them to be dropped. We look to Iran to respect the human rights obligations it has signed up to". Human rights defender and freelance journalist William Nicholas Gomes demanded Immediate and unconditional release of Sotoudeh in August 2018.

==== Release ====
Sotoudeh was released on 18 September 2013 along with ten other political prisoners, including opposition leader Mohsen Aminzadeh, days before an address by Iranian President Hassan Rouhani to the United Nations. No explanation was given for her early release.

=== Third arrest and sentencing ===
Sotoudeh was arrested again in June 2018. According to her lawyer, she was charged with espionage, dissemination of propaganda and disparaging the Supreme Leader of Iran, Ali Khamenei.

On 22 August 2018, 60 members of the European Parliament called on Iranian President Hassan Rouhani to forcefully work for Sotoudeh's "unconditional release."

On 6 March 2019, she was convicted in absentia, after refusing to attend the trial before Tehran's Islamic Revolutionary Court because she was unable to select her counsel. She was charged with several offenses, including being a member of a human rights organization and stoking "corruption and prostitution".

On 11 March, Judge Mohammad Moqiseh told the Islamic Republic News Agency she was sentenced to five years for endangering the country's security through assembly and two years for insulting Khamenei. Later, in January 2025, Moqiseh was assassinated by an assailant. On 12 March 2019 she was sentenced to jail in Tehran, after being charged with several national security-related offenses. While a Tehran judge told the Islamic Republic News Agency she was imprisoned for seven years, it was reported by other sources that the maximum sentence included 10 years in prison and 148 lashes, along with six other verdicts and sentences totaling 38 years bundled together. However, the sentence was reduced later to 10 years total. Sotoudeh's husband, Reza Khandan, said that only the longest sentence of these would be served, which is 10 years imprisonment (for "encouraging corruption and debauchery and providing the means"), out of a total 33 years for seven charges bundled together; this was in addition to five years for another case, bringing the total to 38 years, plus 148 lashes.

On 28 July 2020, Khandan reported that Sotoudeh's bank accounts had been frozen on the orders of the Prosecutor's Office despite none of the charges against her being finance related.

On 11 August 2020, Sotoudeh went on hunger strike, publishing a letter demanding the release of political prisoners, reading: "The appellate process, parole, suspending execution sentences and a new law intent on issuing minimum sentences were all promised, but the enforcement of all these legal rights are assigned to interrogators who apply them extrajudicially, closing the last door on political prisoners." Sotoudeh ended her hunger strike on September 26 due to deteriorating health.

On 17 August 2020, her daughter, Mehraveh Khandan, was arrested at her home by security forces and released on bail later in the day. Iran Human Rights Director Mahmood Amiry-Moghaddam said: "The harassment is aimed at silencing Nasrin Sotoudeh, who is defending basic human rights with her hunger strike. The international community must prevent further harassment of human rights defenders by standing with Nasrin Sotoudeh"

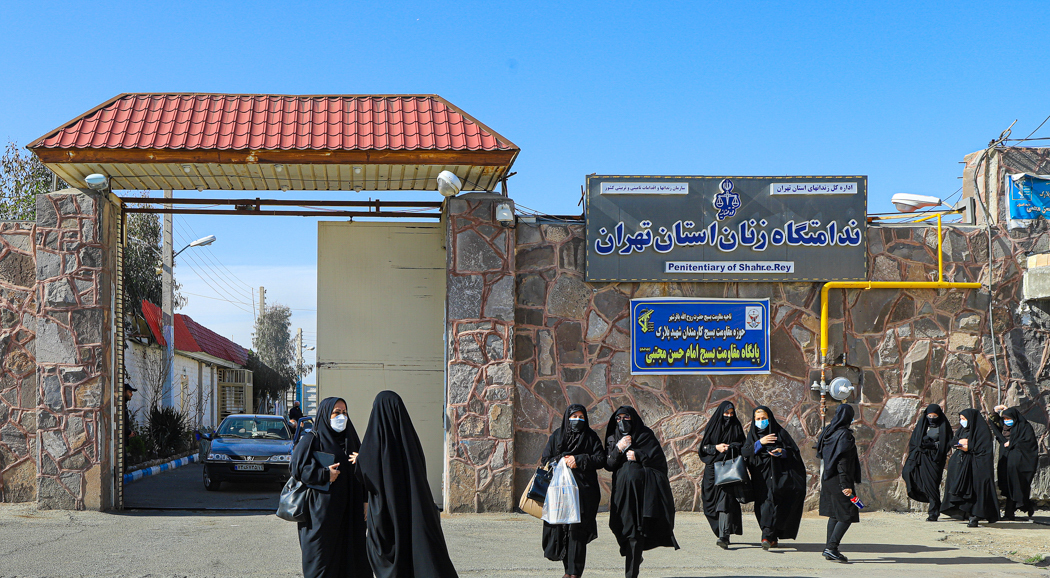
Qarchak women's prison

On 20 October 2020, Sotoudeh was transferred from Evin Prison to Qarchak Prison in Varamin.

On 7 November 2020, she was temporarily freed, having tested positive for COVID-19, then returned to Qarchak Prison on 2 December 2020.

On 9 February 2021, her husband Reza Khandan's bank accounts were also frozen. Speaking to Iran Human Rights he said: "Arresting my daughter and freezing my bank accounts are evidence that punishments have become familial, and when they want to punish an individual, they may violate their civil rights and privacy and even have them fired, freeze their bank accounts, ban them from leaving the country, in other words, use every opportunity to put pressure on that individual or their family members."

She was released on a five-day medical furlough on 21 July 2021 due to a heart problem, during which she underwent an angioplasty. Her medical leave was extended.

Sotoudeh was arrested again in October 2023, at the funeral of teenager Armita Geravand, who went into a coma and died after allegedly being assaulted by the Islamic religious police for not wearing a hijab. Her medical leave was suspended, but she was later released.

On 12 December 2024, her husband Reza Khandan was arrested at their home in Tehran to serve a 2019 sentence, and was later held in Evin Prison.

On the night of 1–2 April 2026, during the 2026 Iran war, Sotoudeh was arrested again at her home in Tehran by agents reportedly affiliated with the Ministry of Intelligence, who confiscated her electronic devices and took her to an undisclosed location. At the time she was on medical leave from prison. Her arrest followed a statement she co-signed on 28 January 2026 condemning the killing of protesters and holding Ali Khamenei responsible. On 10 April, 30 international legal organizations asked UN Special Procedures mandate holders to intervene for the release of Sotoudeh and Khandan. In June 2026, Front Line Defenders reported that she faced a new charge and had allegedly been subjected to torture and ill-treatment in detention.

On 13 May 2026, Sotoudeh was released on bail and placed on medical leave in a Tehran hospital. Khandan remained imprisoned; in June 2026 the UN Working Group on Arbitrary Detention declared his detention arbitrary and called for his release.

==== International response ====
Before the verdict had been announced, the UN deputy high commissioner for human rights, Kate Gilmore, had been allowed to visit Sotoudeh. The visit was the first in many years by UN human rights investigators. The UN investigator on human rights in Iran, Javaid Rehman, raised Sotoudeh's case at the UN human rights council in Geneva on 11 March, saying that she had been "reportedly convicted of charges relating to her work and could face a lengthy prison sentence".

The Center for Human Rights in Iran afterward criticized her conviction and said it proved that the Iranian government was sensitive to any peaceful criticism. Hadi Ghaemi, the executive director, said that the charges, ranging from membership in a human rights group to "encouraging corruption and prostitution", suggest that her detention relates partly to her defense of women who had protested the mandatory hijab.

Amnesty International has condemned her sentencing and stated motives for her conviction, including her backing of women who opposed the mandatory hijab laws.

Philip Luther, Middle East and North Africa Research and Advocacy Director at Amnesty said; "Jailing a human rights defender for her peaceful activities is abhorrent but the fact that the judge in Nasrin Sotoudeh's case used his discretion to ensure that she stays locked up for more than is required under Iranian law compounds the outrageous injustice of her sentence".

In April 2019, actor and activist Nazanin Boniadi was interviewed by CBC News Network anchor Natasha Fatah about female activists in Iran, including Sotoudeh. Boniadi said that Sotoudeh should be lauded and nominated for the Nobel Peace Prize, and also spoke of the bad reputation of the prison, where people were regularly tortured. She also spoke of the lack of support worldwide for the ordinary people of Iran.

In August 2021, a group of Democratic senators of the US Congress introduced a resolution condemning Iran for the unjust imprisonment of Sotoudeh. Sen. Bob Menendez of New Jersey, who heads the Senate Foreign Relations Committee, sponsored the resolution along with eight other Senate Democrats, including Ben Cardin and Chris Van Hollen of Maryland.

In an interview with Rouhollah Zamzameh, Nasrin Sotoudeh stated that patriarchal authoritarian systems lose their political legitimacy when women actively resist discriminatory laws and moral control. She emphasized that Iran’s Revolutionary Courts function as instruments of systematic repression rather than justice, and argued that the current judicial system is not reformable, calling instead for the establishment of a secular judiciary through a democratic referendum.

=== Fourth arrest ===
Sotoudeh was again arrested in 2023. She was later released.

=== Fifth arrest ===
On 2 April 2026, during the 2026 Iran war with the U.S. and Israel, Sotoudeh's daughter announced that her mother had been arrested again. It was not clear which branch of the security forces had taken her, but they had also removed all of her and her husband's electronic devices from their home. Iranian activists have reported that the government had been increasing their repression of civil society during this war.

== Personal life ==
Sotoudeh married Reza Khandan in 1994. They have two children together, including Mehraveh Khandan. Sotoudeh has emphasized that Reza is "truly a modern man," standing beside her and her work during her struggles.

On 13 December 2024, Khandan was arrested for his work for women's rights in Iran, and was held in Evin Prison. The family reported that their son was beaten by officials while attempting to visit her. He was still being held as of April 2026.

== January 2026 public statement and arrest ==
On 28 January 2026, Sotoudeh, along with several other Iranian intellectuals, including Amirsalar Davoudi, Hatam Ghaderi, Abolfazl Ghadyani, Mehdi Mahmoudian, Abdollah Momeni, Mohammad Najafi, Jafar Panahi, Mohammad Rasoulof, and Sedigheh Vasmaghi, and the Narges Mohammadi Human Rights Foundation, published a statement on Instagram asserting that the 2026 Iran massacres were a crime against humanity, accusing Supreme Leader of Iran Ali Khamenei of holding principal responsibility.

On 13 April 2026, HRANA reported that human rights lawyer Sotoudeh has been missing for 12 days following her arrest. On 13 May 2026, she was released on bail following a court appearance.

== Recognition and awards ==
- 2008: International Human Rights Organization of Italy's Human Rights Prize (but barred from leaving the country to accept the honor; received by her husband on her behalf)
- 2011: PEN/Barbara Goldsmith Freedom to Write Award
- 2011: Southern Illinois University School of Law Rule of Law Citation
- 2011: Giuseppe Motta Medal
- 2012: Sakharov Prize of the European Parliament
- 2018: Kurt Tucholsky Prize
- 2018: Ludovic-Trarieux International Human Rights Prize, an annual tribute for a lawyer (Nelson Mandela being the first recipient in 1986)
- 2019: Franco-German Prize for Human Rights and the Rule of Law, accepted on her behalf by fellow human rights lawyer Saeid Dehghan
- 2019: Franz Werfel Human Rights Award
- 2019: Council of Bars and Law Societies of Europe Human Rights Award
- 2020: Human Rights Prize of the German Judges Association
- 2020: Right Livelihood Award
- 2020: Keys to the City of Florence
- 2020: Listed on the BBC's 100 Women list
- 2021: Named as one of Time's 100 Most Influential People in the World
- 2023: Heroine Award from the Alice Schwarzer Foundation in Germany, received by Sotoudeh's friend Mansoureh Shojaee on her behalf
- 2023: Named Global Human Rights Defender by the U.S. State Department
- 2023: Civil Courage Prize from the Train Foundation (U.S.)
- 2023: Brown Democracy Medal from Pennsylvania State University
- 2026: Thulani Maseko Justice Prize from Human Rights Foundation and the Thulani Maseko Foundation
- 2026: Václav Havel Human Rights Prize from the Parliamentary Assembly of the Council of Europe.

== Film appearances ==
Sotoudeh makes an appearance in filmmaker Jafar Panahi's 2015 film Taxi, when she sits in Panahi's car on her way to visit an imprisoned client.

She was the subject of a 2020 documentary film, Nasrin, filmed in secret in Iran about her ongoing activism and her professional and personal life leading up to her second arrest in 2018. Advised by Sotoudeh's husband, Nasrin was made by American filmmakers Jeff Kaufman and his wife Marcia Ross, and narrated by Olivia Colman.

== See also ==
- Women's rights in Iran
- List of Iranian women activists
- List of Muslim feminists
