= Terrence McNally: Every Act of Life =

2018 documentary film

Every Act of Life
- Theatrical release poster
- Directed by: Jeff Kaufman
- Written by: Jeff Kaufman
- Produced by: Jeff Kaufman; Marcia Ross
- Starring: F. Murray Abraham; Christine Baranski; Nathan Lane; Angela Lansbury; Audra McDonald; Terrence McNally; Rita Moreno; Chita Rivera
- Cinematography: Jordan Black; Autumn Eakin; Anthony Lucido
- Edited by: Asher Bingham
- Music by: Laura Karpman; Nora Kroll-Rosenbaum
- Production company: Floating World Pictures
- Distributed by: The Orchard
- Release date: April 23, 2018 (Tribeca)
- Running time: 92 minutes
- Country: United States
- Language: English

Terrence McNally: Every Act of Life is a 2018 documentary film about playwright Terrence McNally. It was directed, produced and written by Jeff Kaufman, and produced by Marcia S. Ross. It premiered at the Tribeca Film Festival in April 2018. It will be distributed by The Orchard in November 2018. An expanded and illustrated version of the script will be published by Smith and Kraus in October 2018. Terrence McNally: Every Act of Life aired June 14, 2019 on PBS’ “American Masters.”

== Synopsis ==
Every Act Of Life is a documentary that profiles four-time Tony-winning playwright Terrence McNally's six ground-breaking decades in the theatre, the fight for LGBTQ rights, triumph over addiction, the pursuit of love, and inspiration at every age, and the power of the arts to transform society.

The son of an alcoholic beer distributor in southern Texas, Terrence McNally graduated from Columbia in 1960, traveled the world as tutor to John Steinbeck's children (Steinbeck's only advice was, "Don't write for the theater. It will break your heart”); suffered an infamous Broadway flop in 1965 at age 24; and went on to write dozens of groundbreaking plays and musicals about sexuality, homophobia, faith, the power of art, the need to connect, and finding meaning in every moment of life. Six-time Tony-winning actress Audra McDonald said, “Terrence gets to the truth in a way that makes you laugh and cry in all different areas – musical theatre and plays. I defy you to name another playwright who can do that. You cannot tell the history of American theatre without celebrating his life and work.” Attorney and LGBTQ activist Roberta Kaplan said, “Terrence started so early to show Americans who gay people are. He did it before anyone else. He did it better than anyone else.” McNally had long relationships with playwrights Edward Albee and Wendy Wasserstein; lost a lover and many friends to AIDS; stopped drinking through the intervention of Angela Lansbury; helped launch the careers of Nathan Lane, F. Murray Abraham, Audra McDonald, Doris Roberts, Patrick Wilson, and Joe Mantello; was an early champion of marriage equality and faced violent protests for his play Corpus Christi; survived Stage 3 lung cancer; and married theatre producer Tom Kirdahy.

Terrence's plays, musicals, operas, and screenplays include: And Things That Go Bump in the Night (1964), Next (1969), Bad Habits (1974), The Ritz (1975), Frankie and Johnny in the Clair de Lune (1982), It's Only a Play (1986/2014), Andre's Mother (1990), The Lisbon Traviata (1989), Lips Together, Teeth Apart (1991), Kiss of the Spider Woman (1992), A Perfect Ganesh (1993), Love! Valour! Compassion! (1994), Master Class (1995), Ragtime (1996), Corpus Christi (1998), Dead Man Walking (2000), The Full Monty (2000), Mothers and Sons (2014), and Anastasia (2017).

== Cast ==
Cast:

- F. Murray Abraham
- Lynn Ahrens
- Jon Robin Baitz
- Christine Baranski
- Dan Bucatinsky (an excerpt from “Bad Habits”)
- Zoe Caldwell
- Bryan Cranston (voice of John Steinbeck)
- Dominic Cuskern
- Tyne Daly
- Jason Danieley
- Edie Falco
- Stephen Flaherty
- John Glover
- Anthony Heald
- Sheryl Kaller
- John Kander
- Roberta Kaplan
- Tom Kirdahy
- Larry Kramer
- Nathan Lane
- Angela Lansbury
- Paul Libin
- Joe Mantello
- Marin Mazzie
- Audra McDonald
- Peter McNally
- Terrence McNally
- Lynne Meadow
- Rita Moreno
- Jack O'Brien
- Billy Porter
- Chita Rivera
- Doris Roberts
- Don Roos
- John Slattery
- Micah Stock
- Meryl Streep (as Terrence’s high school English teacher)
- Richard Thomas
- John Tillinger
- Patrick Wilson

== Press ==
Every Act Of Life won the Freedom Award and Best Documentary at FilmOut San Diego, and Best Documentary and the Audience Award at the Connecticut LGBT Film Festival. It has also screened at dozens of other film festivals. The Village Voice review of the film said, “I wasn’t prepared for the emotional release of Every Act of Life (written and directed by Jeff Kaufman), a wonderful documentary on the prolific playwright Terrence McNally. McNally’s life has the sweep of an epic novel, except that the novel’s inevitable movie version could never have as much star power as his life did.” The Hollywood Reporter review said, “Terrence McNally receives a warm salute as a vital voice in the American theater and an LGBT activist who made the personal political. Jeff Kaufman's briskly entertaining film will be met with heartfelt applause from theater-lovers and LGBT audiences.” Every Act of Life had its premiere at the Tribeca Film Festival (NYC) on April 23, 2018. The premiere included a post-screening discussion moderated by Frank Rich. The panelists included Terrence McNally, Jeff Kaufman, F. Murray Abraham, Tyne Daly, Nathan Lane, and Joe Mantello.

=== Festivals ===
- aGLIFF 2018 (Austin, TX) - September 6, 2018
- Denver Film Society - July 22, 2018
- FilmOut San Diego - June 10, 2018
- Frameline San Francisco International LGBTQ Film Festival - June 16, 2018
- GAZE International LGBT Film Festival (Dublin) - August 6, 2018
- Inside Out (Toronto) - May 26, 2018
- Nashville Film Festival (Nashville, TN) - May 16 & 17, 2018
- North Carolina Gay & Lesbian Film Festival - August 16, August 18, & August 20, 2018
- Outfest: Los Angeles LGBT Film Festival - July 15 & 22, 2018
- Out Film Connecticut (Hartford, CT) - June 9, 2018
- OUT HERE NOW: The Kansas City LGBT Film Festival - June 24, 2018
- Out on Screen: Vancouver Queer Film Festival - August 10, 2018
- OUTshine Film Festival (Miami) - April 29, 2018
- Provincetown International Film Festival - June 14 & 15, 2018
- QDoc Film Festival (Portland, OR) - May 20, 2018
- Seattle International Film Festival (Seattle, WA) - May 31 & June 2, 2018
- TLVFest (Tel Aviv, Israel) - May 31 & June 9, 2018
- Tribeca Film Festival (NYC) - April 23 to April 26, 2018
