= Robert Calhoun (producer) =

American producer

Robert Calhoun (November 24, 1930 – May 24, 2008) was an Emmy Award-winning producer.

== Personal life ==
Calhoun was born in Brooklyn, New York in 1930. He attended University of Maryland and later served in the United States Navy. Calhoun died of lung cancer on May 24, 2008.

Calhoun was the domestic partner of actor Farley Granger.
