= Marcia Ross =

American casting director and film producer

Marcia S. Ross
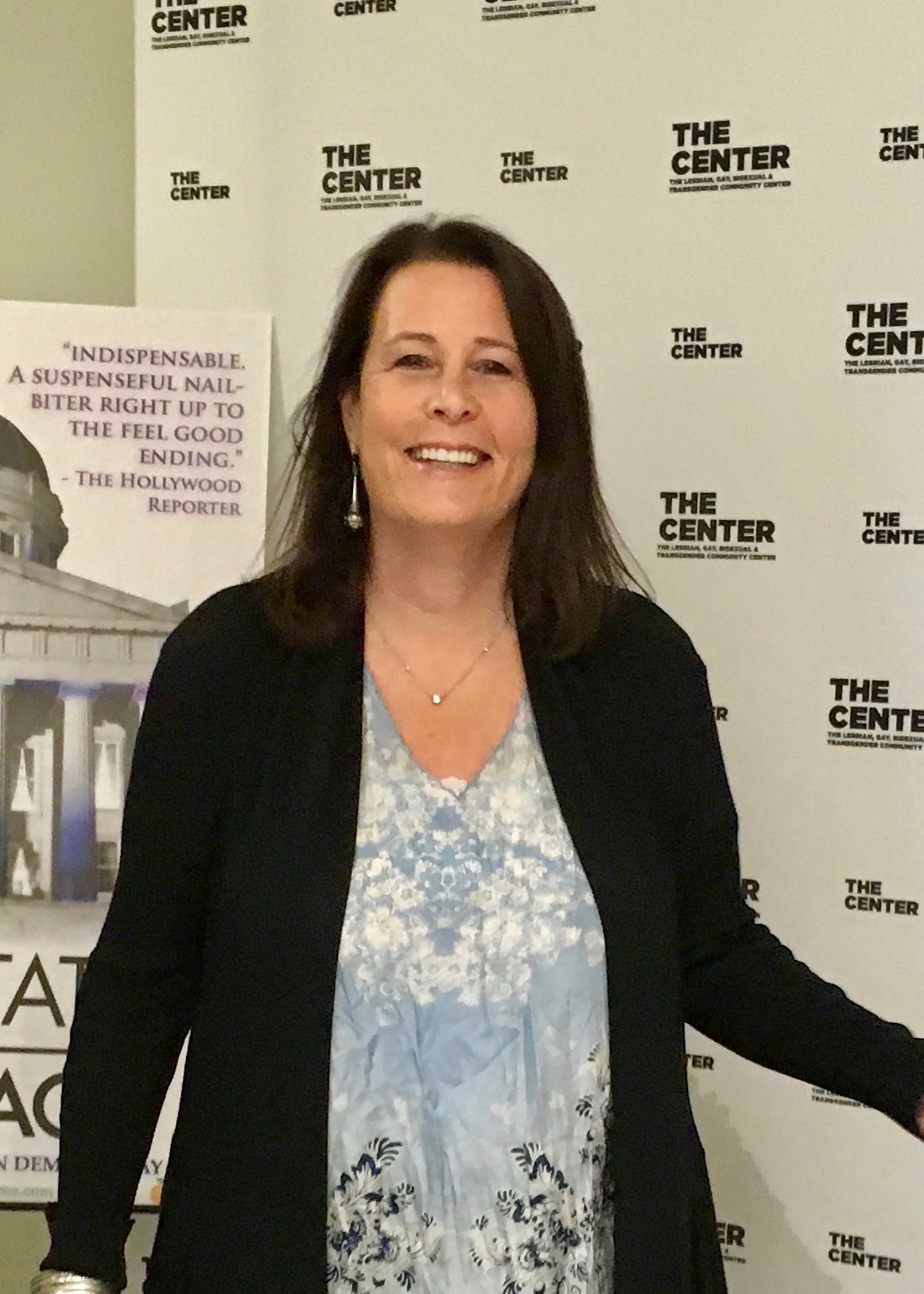
- Born: July 27, 1955 (age 71)
- Occupations: Casting director; Film producer
- Years active: 1975–present
- Spouse: Jeff Kaufman
- Children: 1
- Parent(s): Joan Flug Ross; Richard C. Ross

Marcia S. Ross (born July 27, 1955) is an American casting director and film producer. She is best known for casting such films as Clueless, 10 Things I Hate About You, and The Princess Diaries. Her production credits include the documentaries Terrence McNally: Every Act of Life and Nasrin.

== Early life and education ==
Marcia Ross was born in Mount Vernon, New York, the daughter of Joan (née Flug) and Richard Ross (1927–2012); her father was a New York State Assemblyman for the 88th District. She attended Northwestern University (1973–1975) as a theatre major and has a B.A. from Antioch University Los Angeles (class of 2016).

== Career ==
=== Early career ===
Ross' first professional job was as an apprentice in summer stock theatre at the Westchester Playhouse in Yonkers, New York, followed by touring with a children's theatre company working as an assistant stage manager for producers Barry and Fran Weissler in 1976. She worked at Circle in the Square Theatre in New York City in 1976 and the Monty Silver Talent Agency in 1977. Her first casting job was at CBS Television in New York City in 1979. She then relocated to Los Angeles to work with casting director, Judith Holstra - starting as her assistant, then associate, and partner in Holstra / Ross Casting between 1980 and 1988.

=== As casting director ===
Ross worked as an independent casting director (Marcia Ross Casting) and casting executive for motion pictures and television, working on feature films, network series, pilots, movies for television, and mini-series. She worked for 16 years as EVP for Casting for the Walt Disney Motion Pictures Group, and for five years as SVP for Casting and Talent Development at Warner Brothers Television between 1988 and 1993.

As a casting director, Ross has been credited with introducing several new acting talents, such as Heath Ledger in 10 Things I Hate About You, Anne Hathaway in The Princess Diaries, Rachel McAdams in The Hot Chick, Paul Rudd and Brittany Murphy in Clueless, Chris Pine in The Princess Diaries 2, Megan Fox in Confessions of a Teenage Drama Queen, and Jennifer Garner in Mr. Magoo.

Some of her other notable credits for casting include thirtysomething, Romy and Michele's High School Reunion, The Lookout, The Hitchhiker's Guide to the Galaxy, Parental Guidance, Small Time, and Oblivion.

=== As producer ===
Between 2012 and 2015, Ross co-produced the feature-length documentaries The State of Marriage, Father Joseph, and The Savoy King: Chick Webb and The Music That Changed America, with Jeff Kaufman.

In 2018, Ross co-produced Every Act of Life, a documentary on the playwright and LGBT activist Terrence McNally. It was broadcast as part of the American Masters series on PBS and received an Emmy Award nomination for Outstanding Documentary or Nonfiction Series.

In 2020, Ross and Kaufman co-produced Nasrin, which follows the life and work of the Iranian human rights lawyer Nasrin Sotoudeh, up until the time of her second arrest and imprisonment in 2018. The film was nominated for Best Political Documentary at the 6th Critics' Choice Documentary Awards.

== Personal life ==
She is married to documentary filmmaker and business partner, Jeff Kaufman. She has one daughter, Alice, and two step-children, Anna and Daniel.

== Awards and nominations ==
For casting

Award	Year	Category	Work	Result	Ref
Artios Awards	1988	Dramatic Episodic Casting	thirtysomething	Won	
Artios Awards	1988	Movie of the Week Casting	LBJ: The Early Years	Won	
Artios Awards	1990	Movie of the Week Casting	Murder in Mississippi	Won	
Artios Awards	1992	Movie of the Week Casting	Taking Back My Life: The Nancy Ziegenmeyer Story	Nominated	
Artios Awards	1993	Mini-Series Casting	Sinatra	Nominated	
Artios Awards	1999	Feature Film Casting – Comedy	10 Things I Hate About You	Nominated	
Artios Awards	2002	Feature Film Casting – Comedy	The Princess Diaries	Nominated	
Artios Awards	2005	Feature Film Casting – Comedy	The Hitchhiker’s Guide to the Galaxy	Nominated	
Artios Awards	2007	Feature Film Casting – Drama	The Lookout	Nominated	
Artios Awards	2008	Feature Film Casting – Comedy	Enchanted	Nominated	
Artios Awards	2012	Feature Film Casting – Comedy	The Muppets	Nominated	

For producing

Award	Year	Category	Work	Result	Ref
Emmy Awards	2020	Outstanding Documentary or Nonfiction Series	American Masters	Nominated	
Critics' Choice Documentary Awards	2021	Best Political Documentary	Nasrin	Nominated	

=== Honorary accolades ===
Year	Accolade	Ref
2002	Outstanding Achievement in Casting award from the Hollywood Film Festival	
2005	Hoyt Bowers Award for Career Achievement in Casting by the Casting Society of America	
