= Rick McKay =

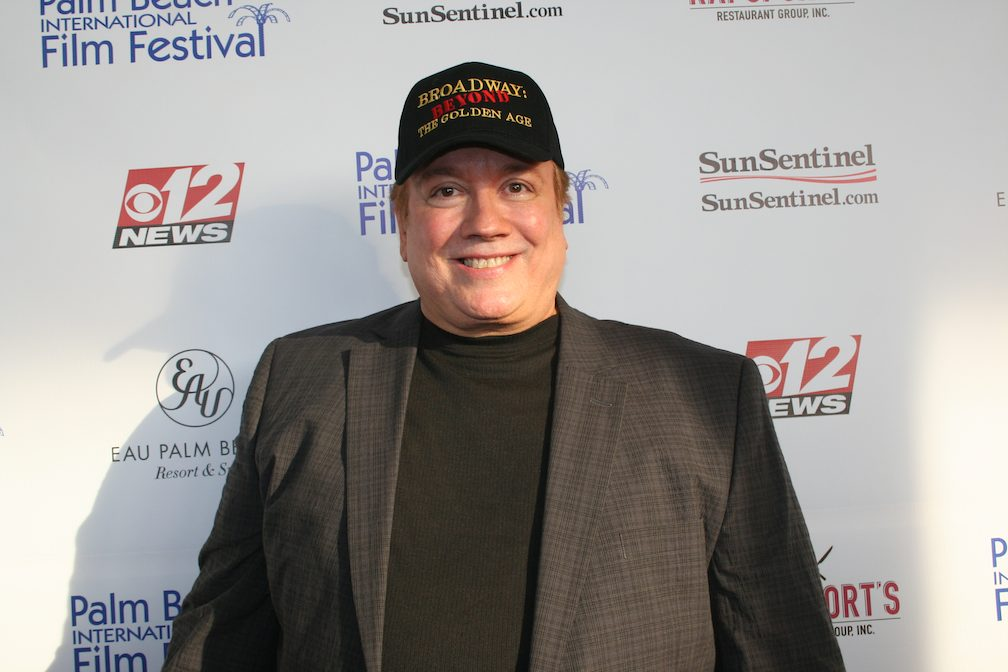
McKay in 2014

Rick McKay (August 30, 1955 - January 29, 2018) was an American filmmaker, best known for his 2003 documentary Broadway: The Golden Age, by the Legends Who Were There followed by 2021 Broadway: Beyond The Golden Age, and their soon-to-be-released threequel. Originally from Indiana, McKay moved to New York City in the early 1980s, working steadily as a cabaret singer.

His first foray into documentary filmmaking was Birds of a Feather, which served as inspiration for Mike Nichols during production on The Birdcage. McKay later turned his sights to television, producing several critically acclaimed shows including WNET13's City Arts, PBS's EGG, the Arts Show, and the Biography series on A&E.

McKay began production on Broadway: The Golden Age, by the Legends Who Were There in 1998, interviewing hundreds of theatrical legends and documenting their stories for posterity. A six-year process, the film was finally released in 2004 and has since gone on to win awards at over 15 film festivals around the country.

There are two sequels of "Broadway", Broadway: Beyond the Golden Age, chronicling Broadway from 1959 to 1981 and Broadway: The Next Generation, which brings the story up to the present. Beyond the Golden Age debuted on PBS in 2021. Following the second film in the Broadway series, McKay's production company, Second Act Productions, also worked on a documentary about the life of actress Fay Wray, with whom McKay was personally acquainted. It is was scheduled for release in 2018.

McKay died at the age of 62 in January 2018.
