= Jeff Kaufman =

American film producer, director, writer and artist

- Born: July 6, 1955 (age 70)
- Occupations: Film producer, director and writer / artist
- Years active: 1993–present
- Known for: Nasrin (2020); Every Act of Life (2018); The State of Marriage (2015)
- Spouse: Marcia Ross
- Family: Richard C. Ross (father-in-law)
- Website: www.jeffkaufman.me

Jeff Kaufman (born July 6, 1955) is an American film producer, director, writer, and artist. Kaufman has produced, written, and directed documentaries focusing on human rights activism and cultural icons including The State of Marriage, Every Act of Life, and Nasrin.

== Early life ==
Kaufman was born in Minnesota and raised in Bellevue, Washington. He dropped out of college and moved to New York City where he worked as a messenger for The New Yorker. Kaufman contributed cartoons to The New Yorker, as well as illustrations to The Los Angeles Times and The New York Times. He also wrote for magazines and newspapers, and exhibited his paintings at art galleries. Kaufman hosted the radio talk show "The Talk of Vermont" in Vermont for five years before moving to Los Angeles in 2000.

== Film career ==
=== 2003–2012: Early works ===
Kaufman directed and produced the Discovery Channel special WTC 9/11: Stories from the Ruins, and episodes for Unsolved History, a Discovery Channel documentary television series. In 2007, he produced Brush With Life: The Art of Being Edward Biberman, a documentary film which portrayed the life of modernist painter Edward Biberman.

In 2011, he produced Education Under Fire, a documentary centered around the persecution of Baháʼís in Iran, in collaboration with Amnesty International. Kaufman's work on his next film, The Savoy King: Chick Webb and the Music That Changed America, drew praise from critics. The film included interviews with Frankie Manning, Van Alexander, Louie Bellson, Roy Haynes, and Norma Miller. It featured the voices of Billy Crystal, John Legend, Janet Jackson, Jeff Goldblum, Ron Perlman, Tyne Daly, Andy Garcia, Danny Glover, Keith David, Eugene Robinson, and Charlie Watts.

=== 2015–2018: The State of Marriage and Every Act of Life ===
In 2015, Kaufman directed, co-produced and wrote the critically acclaimed documentary film The State of Marriage, about the same-sex marriage movement in Vermont. Kaufman credited "countless examples of personal and political courage" that he witnessed during his stint as a radio host in Vermont as his inspiration to make the film. His next film Father Joseph depicted the contributions of Haitian Catholic priest Joseph Philippe in the empowerment of Haitians living in poverty.

In 2018, Kaufman wrote and directed Every Act of Life, a documentary on the playwright and LGBT activist Terrence McNally, featuring F. Murray Abraham, Christine Baranski, Nathan Lane, Angela Lansbury, Audra McDonald, Rita Moreno, Billy Porter, Chita Rivera, and Patrick Wilson, with the voices of Bryan Cranston and Meryl Streep. The film premiered at the Tribeca Film Festival and was screened at dozens of other film festivals. It was broadcast as part of the American Masters series on PBS and received an Emmy Award nomination for Outstanding Documentary or Nonfiction Series.

=== 2020–present: Nasrin and beyond ===
In 2020, Kaufman produced a short documentary focusing on women's rights in Iran called 40 Million: The Struggle for Women's Rights in Iran. Later that year, he produced and directed Nasrin, a documentary feature on Nasrin Sotoudeh and her fight for the rights of women, children and minorities in Iran. Narrated by Olivia Colman, the documentary was filmed secretly in Iran between late 2017 and mid 2018. It premiered at The Boston Globe's GlobeDocs Film Festival and was screened at dozens of film festivals, receiving positive reviews from critics. Kaufman said about Sotoudeh, "There’s a good reason Nasrin has been called 'The Nelson Mandela of Iran'. She has the same kind of determination, resilience and vision." Nasrin was released on Hulu in June 2021 and nominated for Best Political Documentary at the 6th Critics' Choice Documentary Awards.

In 2023, Kaufman launched a button campaign called "I oppose the mandatory hijab" in solidarity with the Woman, Life, Freedom movement in Iran. The project's partners included PEN America, Robert F. Kennedy Human Rights, Parliamentarians for Global Action, and the United Nations Special Rapporteur on Human Rights in Iran.

== Other work ==
=== Art ===
Kaufman exhibited paintings in Los Angeles before becoming a filmmaker, and has continued to paint and exhibit. His artwork typically makes use of acrylic paint on wood, and involves the scraping down and reapplying of multiple thin layers of paint. His recent work comprises a series of paintings linked to one theme, such as the Nahua deity Tláloc, the Russian invasion of Ukraine, and the Babi Yar massacres.

=== Theatre ===
Kaufman has written several full-length and short plays. In March 2024, his play First Aid was a winner at the Long Beach Playhouse New Works Festival.

== Personal life ==
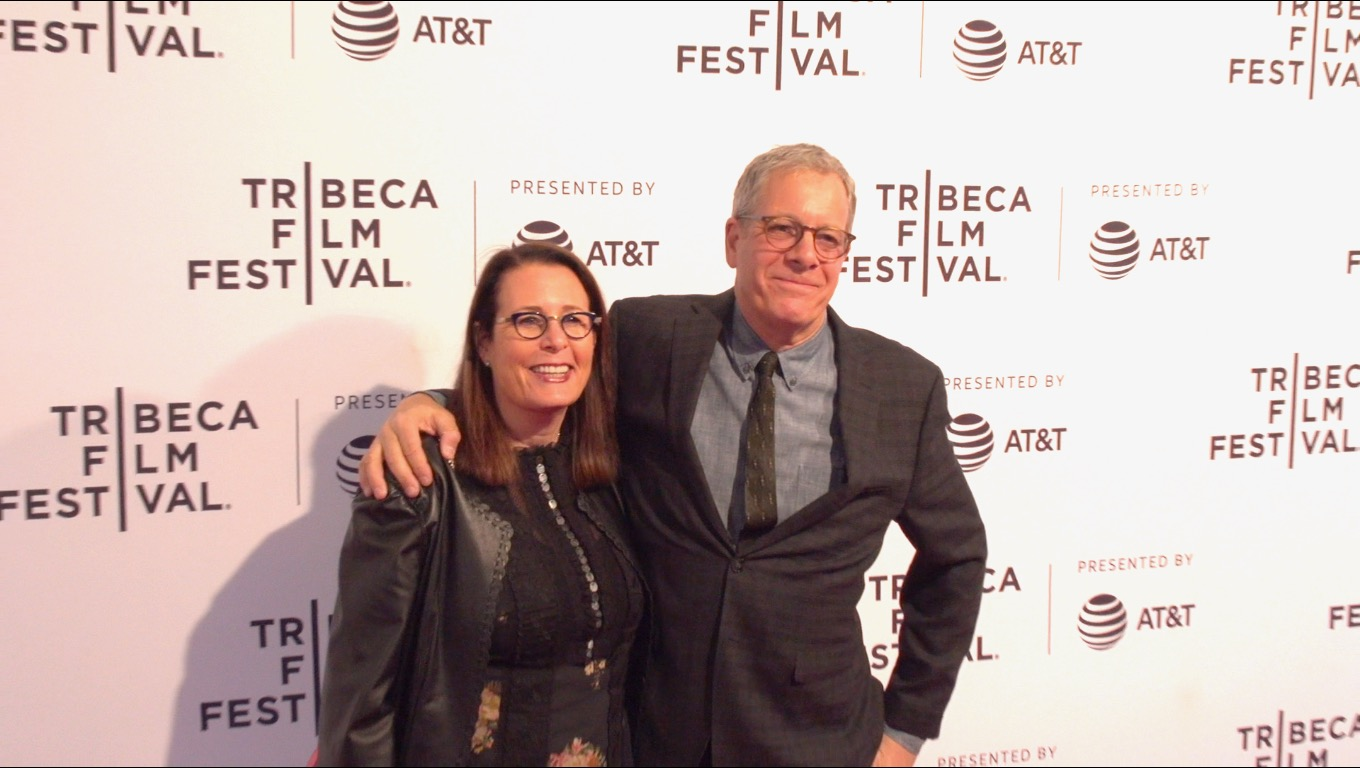
Jeff Kaufman and Marcia Ross at the premiere of their film Every Act of Life at the Tribeca Film Festival.

Kaufman is married to Marcia Ross, a casting director and documentary producer, with whom he has produced six documentary films. He has two children–Anna Kaufman and Daniel Kaufman.

== Filmography ==
| Year | Film | Credits |
|---|---|---|
| 2020 | Nasrin | writer, director, producer |
| 2020 | 40 Million: The Struggle for Women's Rights in Iran | writer, director, producer |
| 2018 | Every Act of Life | writer, director, producer |
| 2015 | Father Joseph | writer, director, producer |
| 2015 | The State of Marriage | writer, director, producer |
| 2012 | The Savoy King: Chick Webb & the Music That Changed America | writer, director, producer |
| 2011 | Education Under Fire | writer, director, producer |
| 2010 | Free Shane and Josh | writer, director, producer |
| 2007 | Brush with Life: The Art of Being Edward Biberman | writer, director, producer |
| 2005 | Unsolved History: The Hope Diamond | director, producer |
| 2004 | Unsolved History: Hunting Nazis | director, producer |
| 2003 | WTC 9/11: Stories from the Ruins | writer, director, producer |
| 2003 | The Last Mission | associate producer |

== Awards and nominations ==
| Year | Award | Category | Work | Result | Ref(s) |
|---|---|---|---|---|---|
| 2015 | GlobeDocs Film Festival | Audience Award | The State of Marriage | Won | |
| 2018 | Tampa International Gay and Lesbian Film Festival | Audience Award for Best Documentary Feature | Every Act of Life | Won | |
| 2020 | Emmy Awards | Outstanding Documentary or Nonfiction Series | American Masters | Nominated | |
| 2021 | Critics' Choice Documentary Awards | Best Political Documentary | Nasrin | Nominated | |
| 2021 | Cinema for Peace Awards | Award for Women’s Empowerment | Nasrin | Won | |
| 2021 | Terra di Tutti Film Festival | The Voices of Invisible Women Award | Nasrin | Won | |
