= Mohammad Najafi =

Iranian lawyer (born 1975)

- Born: 22 March 1975 (age 51); Shazand, Iran
- Occupations: Lawyer; Human rights activist
- Years active: 2009–present
- Known for: Advocacy for political prisoners, including the case of Vahid Heydari
- Opponent: Government of Iran
- Criminal charges: Insulting the Supreme Leader; Spreading lies; Propaganda against the regime
- Criminal penalty: 14 years in prison and 74 lashes

Mohammad Najafi (Persian: محمد نجفی; born 22 March 1975) is an Iranian lawyer, human rights activist, and political prisoner. He has been repeatedly detained and sentenced to long prison terms by the Iranian security forces due to his involvement in human rights cases, such as the case of Vahid Heydari, a protester who died under suspicious circumstances in a detention center in Arak during the 2017–2018 Iranian protests. A vocal critic of the Iranian government, Najafi has been sentenced to over 14 years in prison on charges including "insulting the Supreme Leader", "spreading lies", and "propaganda against the regime".

During his imprisonment, Najafi has gone on hunger strikes several times, and due to his deteriorating health, human rights organizations and Iranian lawyers have repeatedly raised concerns about his condition.

== Early life and career ==
Mohammad Najafi was an attorney in Shazand, Iran. He became well known for his voluntary defense of political detainees, his investigation into cases related to the deaths of protesters, and his interviews with international media. His outspoken criticism of the suppression of protesters in Iran led to multiple arrests and threats. Since 2017, he has faced nine judicial orders.

== Arrests and sentences ==
=== Initial arrests ===
Najafi's first arrest took place on 9 February 2017, while he was filming a protest by workers at the HEPCO factory in Arak.

On 16 January 2018, after pursuing the case of Vahid Haydari, a protester who died in detention during the December 2017 protests, Najafi was arrested again.

=== Legal sentences ===
- On 30 August 2018, Mohammad Najafi was sentenced to 3 years in prison and 74 lashes.
- On 11 December 2018, the Revolutionary Court sentenced him to an additional 10 years in prison, bringing his total sentence to 14 years.
- On 12 April 2023, he was sentenced to another 3 years in prison in a new case, along with a 150 million rial fine.

=== Hunger strikes and protests in prison ===
Najafi has gone on several hunger strikes during his imprisonment:

- 19 August 2019: After protesting against Ali Khamenei and publishing a critical letter, he was transferred to solitary confinement and began a hunger strike, which continued until he was returned to the general prison ward. He cited one of the reasons for his hunger strike as the false case fabrication against his wife and child by the Intelligence Directorate of Arak.
- 12 April 2023: After being denied medical care, Najafi started another hunger strike that lasted 55 days, severely deteriorating his health.

== Health issues and denial of treatment ==
During his imprisonment, Mohammad Najafi has faced serious health issues, yet authorities have repeatedly prevented his transfer to hospitals:

- 26 August 2021: Despite suffering a heart attack and promises from prison authorities, Najafi was denied medical leave or transfer to an outside hospital.
- 25 April 2023: Despite his illness, Najafi was returned to prison before completing his treatment.

== Efforts to revoke his law license ==
On 3 September 2023, the Iranian judiciary attempted to revoke Mohammad Najafi’s law license. This move was met with widespread protests from Iranian lawyers.

== Reactions and support ==
Human rights activists and international organizations have repeatedly protested the situation of Mohammad Najafi:

- Amnesty International has called for his immediate release.
- Iran Human Rights Organization has stated that Najafi has been imprisoned due to legal activities defending the rights of citizens, facing fabricated charges and unfair sentences.
- Iranian lawyers, both inside and outside the country, such as Shirin Ebadi and Nasrin Sotoudeh, have protested his continued detention and urged the international community to put pressure on Iran for his release.

== January 2026 public statement ==
On 28 January 2026, Najafi, along with several other Iranian intellectuals, including Amirsalar Davoudi, Hatam Ghaderi, Abolfazl Ghadyani, Mehdi Mahmoudian, Abdollah Momeni, Jafar Panahi, Mohammad Rasoulof, Nasrin Sotoudeh, and Sedigheh Vasmaghi, and the Narges Mohammadi Human Rights Foundation, published a statement on Instagram asserting that the 2026 Iran massacres were a crime against humanity, accusing Supreme Leader of Iran Ali Khamenei of holding principal responsibility.

== Awards ==
=== European Bar Associations Award for Human Rights ===
On 28 November 2019 (7 Azar 1398), the Council of Bars and Law Societies of Europe awarded their Human Rights Prize to four Iranian lawyers, including Mohammad Najafi and Nasrin Sotoudeh. Three of these four lawyers, including Mohammad Najafi, were in prison at the time of receiving the award for defending political prisoners.

=== Iranian Defenders of Human Rights Award ===
Defenders of Human Rights Center awarded the "Human Rights Advocate" prize in 2019 to Mohammad Najafi, the imprisoned lawyer and human rights activist. Mohammad Seifzadeh, Abdolfattah Soltani, and Masoumeh Dehghan, representatives of the association, attended his home in Arak and presented the award statue to Najafi’s family.

== See also ==
- Human rights in the Islamic Republic of Iran
- 2017–2018 Iranian protests
