= Amirsalar Davoudi =

Iranian human rights lawyer

- امیرسالار داوودی
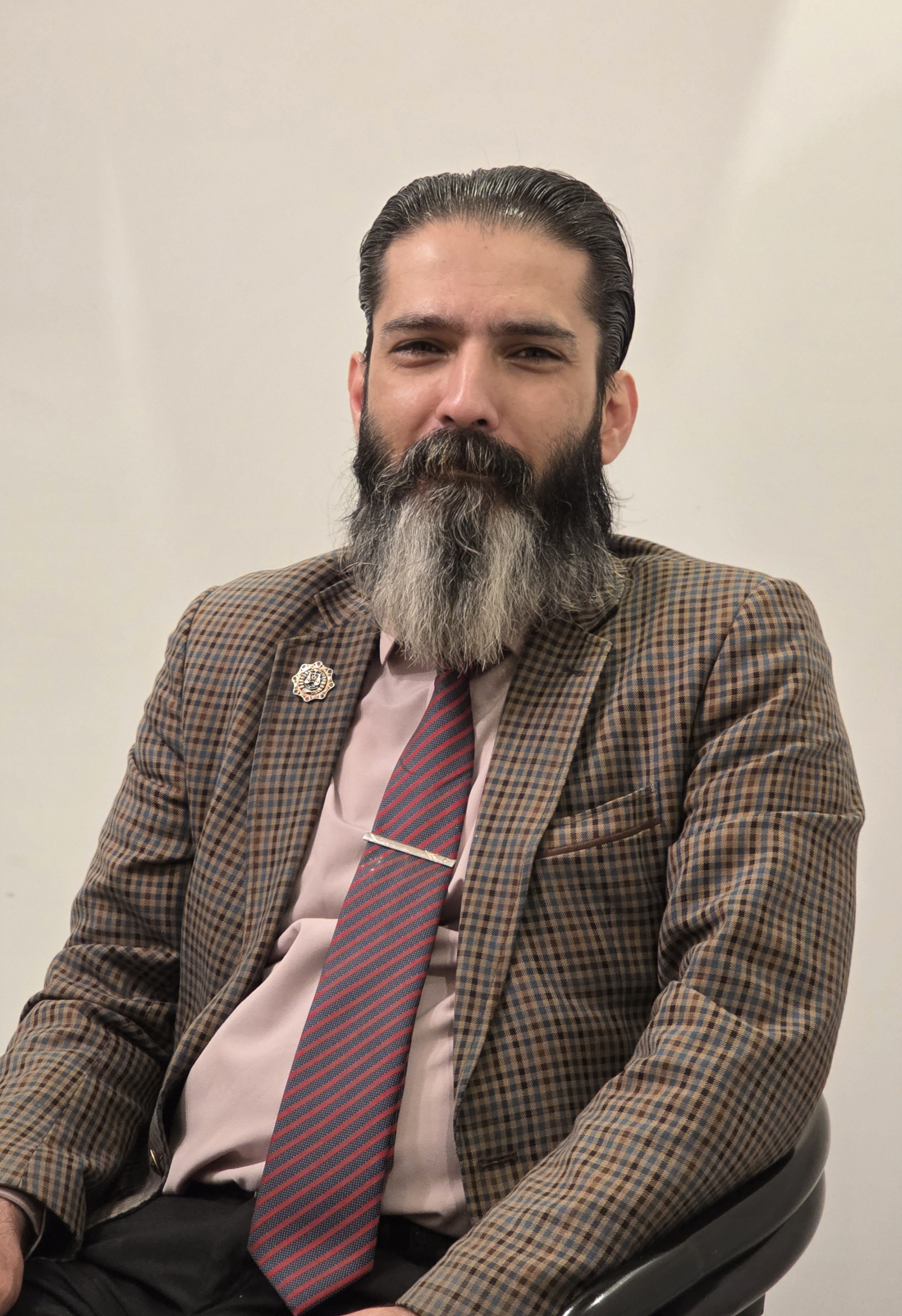
- Born: June 21, 1981 (age 45); Iran
- Occupation: Human Rights Lawyer

Amirsalar Davoudi (born 21 June 1981, Persian: امیرسالار داوودی) is an Iranian human rights lawyer. He was sentenced to 30 years in prison and 111 lashes for his human rights work.

The charges on which he has been convicted include "insulting officials", "insulting the Supreme Leader", and "spreading propaganda against the system". He was arrested on 20 November 2018 and has been detained in Tehran's Evin prison with extremely limited access to his family and lawyer.

Amnesty International calls for his immediate and unconditional release.

Davoudi, in the past years, has been defending some of Iranian political prisoners and religious and ethnic minorities. He was also active on social media criticizing the violation of human rights in his country.

== Arrest ==
On 20 November 2018 security forces arrested Davoudi in his office in Tehran and transferred him to Evin Prison. Many other political prisoners are kept in this prison.

His arrest was part of a crackdown against active lawyers. Davoudi was among four lawyers arrested for their human rights activities.

== 2019 arrest and sentence ==
On 1 June 2019, Davoudi was sentenced to 30 years in jail plus 111 lashes. The ruling was handed out by Branch 15 of the Tehran Revolutionary Court, presided over by Abolqasem Salavati. His sentence is composed partly of 15 years for allegedly "forming a group to overthrow the political system", through the means of his Telegram channel "No Retouch", where he discussed breaches in judicial processes and harassment of lawyers by the judiciary and other human rights abuses. Additionally, he was sentenced for alleged "propaganda against the system" due to his interviews with Voice of America, "publishing lies" and "insulting officials and the Supreme Leader" amongst other charges. He did not appeal his sentence and so, on 30 July 2019, his sentence was automatically upheld.

Davoudi’s lawyer, Vahid Moshkani Farahani, told Iran Human Rights in an interview that, "besides the 30 years of imprisonment in which 15 years will be implemented, Mr Davoudi has been sentenced to (...) a court fine of Rls 60 million (around US$4,000) and deprivation of his social rights for two years.”

In its annual report in February 2020, Amnesty International reported that he had been on a hunger strike since 9 February 2020. As of this report, he was still imprisoned in Evin Prison.

== International reaction ==
Philip Luther, Research and Advocacy Director for the Middle East and North Africa to the Amnesty International, called Davoudi's detainment a shocking injustice and that he was being punished for his advocating human rights. Philip Luther called for Davoudi's immediate release.

== January 2026 public statement ==
On 28 January 2026, Davoudi, along with several other Iranian intellectuals, including Hatam Ghaderi, Abolfazl Ghadyani, Mehdi Mahmoudian, Abdollah Momeni, Mohammad Najafi, Jafar Panahi, Mohammad Rasoulof, Nasrin Sotoudeh, and Sedigheh Vasmaghi, and the Narges Mohammadi Human Rights Foundation, published a statement on Instagram asserting that the 2026 Iran massacres were a crime against humanity, accusing Supreme Leader of Iran Ali Khamenei of holding principal responsibility.

== 2026 arrest ==
On 11 October 2026, Davoudi was arrested while working a case at the Revolutionary Court in Isfahan. His family and lawyer were not informed of his location until 13 October, when the head of the judiciary for Isfahan province confirmed he had been charged with "“spreading false information online with the intention of disturbing public opinion”, “inciting people to kill one another with the intention of disrupting national security” and “propaganda against the state". After being held in solitary confinement, Davoudi was transferred to a hospital on 2 November after having a heart attack. On 9 November, he was presented at a court hearing, where he was formally charged.

== Awards ==
- 2019: Council of Bars and Law Societies of Europe (CCBE) Human Rights Award
- 2022: Ludovic-Trarieux International Human Rights Prize

== See also ==
- Nasrin Sotoudeh
- Abdolfattah Soltani
- Mohammad Seifzadeh
- Kasra Nouri
- Human rights in the Islamic Republic of Iran
