= Iran-e-Farda =

- Cover of No. 131, June 2020
- Editor: Keyvan Samimi
- Categories: Social, Political, Economical, Cultural
- Frequency: Biweekly (formerly); Monthly
- Format: A4
- Publisher: Hamed Sahabi
- Total circulation (2000): 50,000
- Founder: Ezatollah Sahabi
- Founded: 1992; 33 years ago
- First issue: June 1992
- Final issue: December 2020
- Country: Iran
- Based in: Tehran
- Language: Persian
- OCLC: 1011738022

Iran-e Farda (Persian: ایران فردا, romanized: Īrān-i fardā, lit. 'Tomorrow's Iran') is an Iranian nationalist-religious periodical publication printed in magazine-format and published digitally that focuses on current sociopolitical affairs of Iran.

== History ==
Iran-e-Farda began publication in 1992. As of December 1995, one survey found that the magazine was Iran's leading political monthly. In 1996, the state-run IRIB TV1 aired a programme named Hoviyat which frequently attacked Iran-e-Farda and accused it of being one of the "bases for the West's cultural invasion of Iran". In response, the magazine's managing director Ezatollah Sahabi wrote an open letter to President Akbar Hashemi Rafsanjani, which was published by Salam, asking for an opportunity to defend itself. During presidency of Mohammad Khatami, it became increasingly outspoken in advocating civil society and asked Khatami to fulfill his promises and called for more freedom and tolerance. It also frequently criticized the conservative establishment.

The magazine was banned in April 2000 during crackdown of more than a dozen reformist newspapers. At the time, it had been published on a biweekly basis and had an estimated circulation of 50,000 which was several times more than most other periodicals in Iran.

Iran-e-Farda was relaunched in May 2014 but ceased publication in December 2020, after it was banned again.

== Political alignment ==
The magazine was known as the mouthpiece of the Council of Nationalist-Religious Activists of Iran and has been described as "an intellectual monthly which became a forum for their liberal notion of Islam", as well as "associated with the Freedom Movement of Iran". According to Wilfried Buchta, the magazine was where "Islamic-left" and "nationalist-religious" were gathered around Ezatollah Sahabi. Yadullah Shahibzadeh argues that post-Islamist and neo-Shariatist movements have been associated with Iran-e-Farda and used it as a platform to enter the public space in the 1990s.

== Staff ==
Ezatollah Sahabi was the founder and managing director of Iran-e-Farda and Reza Alijani was its editor-in-chief. After relaunch in 2014, Kayvan Samimi served as its editor-in-chief and Hamed Sahabi was the magazine's publisher.

Contributing editors and other columnists who at some time have wrote for Iran-e-Farda include:

- Hasan Yousefi Eshkevari
- Hoda Saber
- Ahmad Zeidabadi
- Taghi Rahmani
- Lotfollah Meisami
- Habibollah Peyman
- Alireza Rajaei
