= Narges Mohammadi =

Iranian human rights activist (born 1972)

- نرگس محمدی
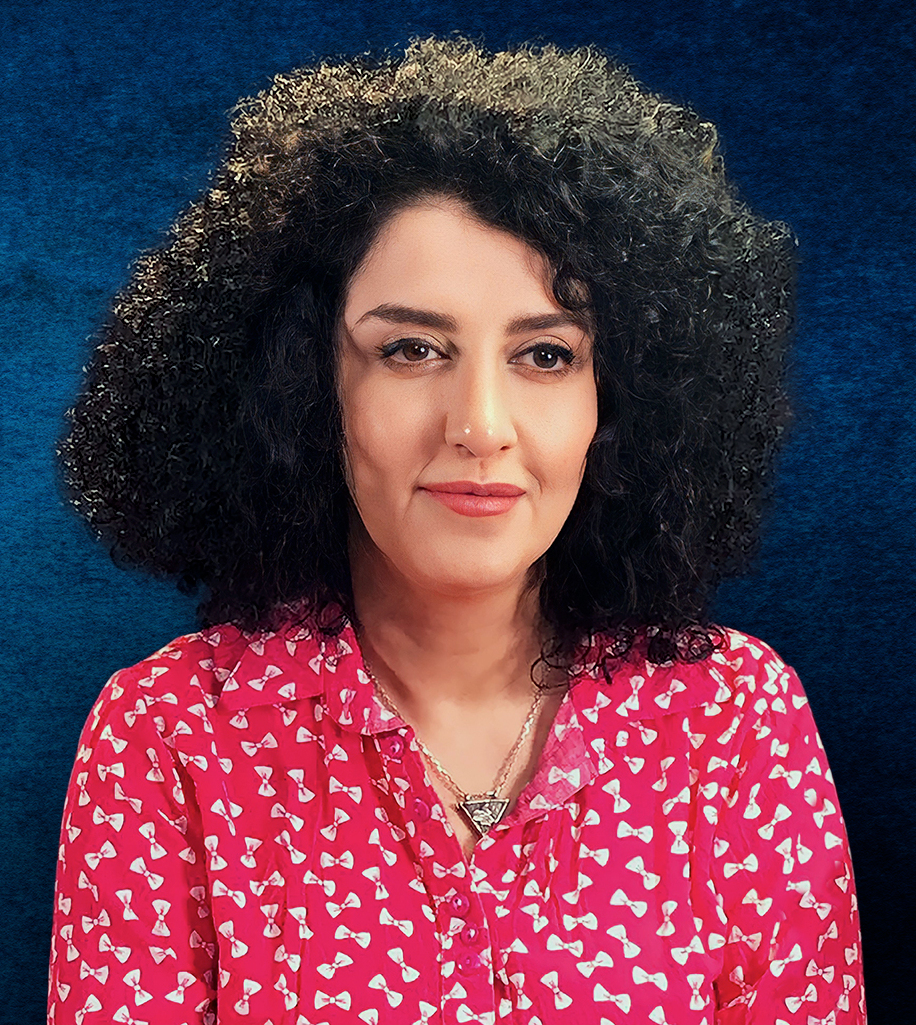
- Born: 21 April 1972 (age 54); Zanjan, Iran
- Education: Imam Khomeini International University (BS)
- Organizations: Defenders of Human Rights Center; National Council for Peace
- Movement: Neo-Shariatism
- Spouse: Taghi Rahmani (m. 2001)
- Children: 2
- Awards: Alexander Langer Award (2009); Andrei Sakharov Prize (2018); Nobel Peace Prize (2023)

Narges Mohammadi (Persian: نرگس محمدی; born 21 April 1972) is an Iranian human rights activist and Nobel Peace Prize laureate. Between 1998 and October 2023, Mohammadi was arrested 13 times and sentenced to 31 years in prison and 154 lashes. She has been the recipient of many human rights awards. In October 2023, while in prison, she was awarded the 2023 Nobel Peace Prize "for her fight against the oppression of women in Iran and her fight to promote human rights and freedom for all".

== Biography ==
Narges Mohammadi was born on 21 April 1972 in Zanjan, Iran, to an Iranian Azerbaijani family. After graduating from high school, she attended Qazvin International University, receiving a degree in applied physics. While at university, she co-founded the group "Tashakkol Daaneshjooei Roshangaraan" (The Illuminating Student Group, or a group that sheds light on complex issues), also known as "Enlighteners". They explored the concept of Neo-Shariatism, and advocated for a secular democracy. The group's activism met with threats from the university and the pro-regime groups and Narges was twice arrested. Also while in university, Narges started a mountain-climbing group for women and men, something which was not allowed.

Mohammadi began her journalism career in 1996, writing about women's rights, human rights and the student movement in the progressive magazine Payam Hajar, where she became a member of the editorial board. She was arrested in 1998 for criticism of the Iranian regime. When the Iranian judiciary conducted a wide-spread repression campaign against journalists in 1999, she lost her job and went to work as an inspector for the Iran Engineering Inspection Company. In 2009, she was fired from this post, under orders from authorities, due to her involvement with the Committee for the Defense of Prisoners' Rights, and the Defenders of Human Rights Center (DHRC), where she was on the supervisory council, head of the Center's committee on women's rights, and deputy to its co-founder Shirin Ebadi. While at the center, Mohammadi worked to establish independent human rights institutions, including the Committee for the Defense of Free and Fair Elections, the Committee for Abolishing the Death Penalty for Children, and the National Peace Council, a group of 82 political, social, civil, cultural, trade union and human rights leaders. She also advocated for the release of political prisoners and against solitary confinement. This resulted in her 2001 arrest, where she was held in solitary confinement at the barracks of the Islamic Revolutionary Guard Corps (IRGC) before being sentenced to one year in prison.

In 2010, Mohammadi was arrested and held in solitary confinement for a month before being released. She developed an epilepsy-like disease, causing her to periodically lose muscle control; she was released and allowed to seek medical treatment. In 2011, she was sentenced to 11 years in prison for "acting against national security, membership of the DHRC and propaganda against the regime". Mohammadi stated that she was "given an unprecedented 23-page judgement issued by the court in which they repeatedly likened my human rights activities to attempts to topple the regime." Under appeal, this sentence was reduced to six years.

The sentence was protested by the British Foreign Office, which called it "another sad example of the Iranian authorities' attempts to silence brave human rights defenders." Amnesty International designated her a prisoner of conscience and called for her immediate release. Reporters Without Borders issued an appeal on Mohammadi's behalf, stating that Mohammadi was a prisoner whose life was "in particular danger." In July 2012, an international group of lawmakers called for her release, including US Senator Mark Kirk, former Canadian Attorney General Irwin Cotler, UK MP Denis MacShane, Australian MP Michael Danby, Italian MP Fiamma Nirenstein, and Lithuanian MP Emanuelis Zingeris. On 31 July 2012, Mohammadi was released from prison on bail.

While free on bail, Mohammadi founded the Women’s Citizenship Center, and worked with an organization called The Campaign for Step by Step Abolition of the Death Penalty, also known as 'Legam'. On 31 October 2014, Mohammadi made a speech at the gravesite of Sattar Beheshti, stating, "How is it that the Parliament Members are suggesting a Plan for the Promotion of Virtue and Prevention of Vice, but nobody spoke up two years ago when an innocent human being by the name of Sattar Beheshti died under torture in the hands of his interrogator?" The video of her speech quickly went viral on social media networks, resulting in her arrest.

On 5 May 2015, Mohammadi was once again arrested. Branch 15 of the Revolutionary Court sentenced her to ten years' imprisonment on the charge of "founding an illegal group", in reference to Legam, five years for "assembly and collusion against national security", and one year for "propaganda against the system" for her interviews with international media and her March 2014 meeting with the European Union's then-High Representative for Foreign Affairs and Security Policy Catherine Ashton. This sentence was upheld by the appeal court. While the appeal was being considered, she was released on bail and launched a campaign against solitary confinement and its effects, publishing the essay collection The Reforms, the Strategy, and the Tactics and producing the documentary White Torture.

In January 2019, Mohammadi began a hunger strike with the detained British-Iranian citizen Nazanin Zaghari-Ratcliffe in Evin Prison to protest being denied access to medical care. In July 2020, she showed symptoms of a COVID-19 infection, from which she appeared to have recovered by August. On 8 October 2020, Mohammadi was released from prison.

In March 2021, Mohammadi wrote the foreword to the Iran Human Rights Annual Report on the Death Penalty in Iran:

"The execution of people like Navid Afkari and Ruhollah Zam in the past year, have been the most ambiguous executions in Iran. Issuing the death penalty for Ahmad Reza Djalali is one of the most erroneous sentences and the reasons for the issuance of these death sentences need to be carefully examined. These people have been sentenced to death after being held in solitary confinement and subjected to horrific psychological and mental torture, that is why I do not consider the judicial process to be fair or just; I see keeping defendants in solitary confinement, forcing them to make untrue and false confessions that are used as the key evidence in issuing these sentences. That's why I am particularly worried about the recent arrests in Sistan and Balochistan and Kurdistan, and I hope that anti-death penalty organisations will pay special attention to the detainees because I fear that we will be facing another wave of executions over the coming year."

In May 2021, Branch 1188 of Criminal Court Two in Tehran sentenced Mohammadi to two and a half years in prison, 80 lashes, and two separate fines for charges including "spreading propaganda against the system". Four months later, she received a summons to begin serving this sentence, which she did not respond to as she considered the conviction unjust. On 16 November 2021, Mohammadi was arrested in Karaj, Alborz, while attending a memorial for Ebrahim Ketabdar, who was killed by Iranian security forces during nationwide protests in November 2019. Her arrest was condemned as arbitrary by Amnesty International and the International Federation for Human Rights.

In December 2022, during the Mahsa Amini protests, the BBC published a report by Mohammadi detailing the sexual and physical abuse of detained women. In January 2023, she gave a report from prison detailing the condition of women in Evin Prison, including a list of 58 prisoners and the interrogation process and tortures they had gone through; 57 of the women had spent a total of 8350 days in solitary confinement, and 56 of them were sentenced to 3300 months in total. She has been a vocal proponent of mass feminist civil disobedience against the mandatory hijab in Iran and a vocal critic of hijab and chastity program of 2023.

Mohammadi has been an outspoken critic of solitary confinement, calling it "White Torture" in her 2022 book White Torture: Interviews with Iranian Women Prisoners. In September 2023, she supported Mehdi Yarrahi after his arrest for the protest song "Roosarito". She was being held in Evin Prison when she was awarded the Nobel Peace Prize in October 2023.

In May 2024, Mohammadi announced that she was facing fresh charges of offences against the state of Iran. It was reported on 19 November 2024 that she had undergone complex surgery in Iran that saw part of a bone in her right leg removed over cancer fears, but she was returned to prison. She was granted a temporary leave from prison in December 2024 for three weeks to have medical treatment, following her earlier surgery for a potentially cancerous bone lesion.

In January 2025, she announced that she had finished writing her autobiography, and was writing a book on abuses and sexual harassment against women detained in Iran. In July 2025 the Norwegian Nobel Committee reported that Mohammadi had been threatened with "physical elimination" by Iran.

On 12 December 2025, Mohammadi was rearrested while attending a memorial ceremony for a deceased human rights lawyer Khosrow Alikordi in Mashhad, alongside Pouran Nazemi and Sepideh Qolian. The Nobel Committee urged Iran to disclose her whereabouts. On 15 December it was reported that, following her arrest, which involved blows to the head and neck, she was hospitalized twice.

On 28 January 2026, the Narges Mohammadi Human Rights Foundation, along with several other Iranian intellectuals, including Amirsalar Davoudi, Hatam Ghaderi, Abolfazl Ghadyani, Mehdi Mahmoudian, Abdollah Momeni, Mohammad Najafi, Jafar Panahi, Mohammad Rasoulof, Nasrin Sotoudeh, and Sedigheh Vasmaghi, published a statement on Instagram asserting that the 2026 Iran massacres were a crime against humanity, and accusing Supreme Leader of Iran Ali Khamenei of holding principal responsibility.

On 8 February 2026, an Iranian court in the north-eastern city of Mashhad sentenced Mohammadi to seven years and six months (six years for "gathering and collusion", and 18 months for "propaganda activities") in prison and two years of internal exile in South Khorasan, with the sentences running concurrently for a total of six years. She did not defend herself, as she believes that the Iranian judiciary is illegitimate, but went on a hunger strike for a week to protest her detention conditions.

AP News reported on 1 April 2026 that she had most likely had a heart attack. According to her lawyers who visited her in Zanjan Prison, she was in bad condition, had lost weight, and was found unconscious on 24 March. The prison doctor who examined her said she had had a heart attack. She remained unconscious for over an hour, and despite her serious condition, she was only treated in the prison infirmary, and not taken to hospital. On 15 April, it was reported that she was in critical condition. On May 1, 2026, it was reported that Mohammadi's health had deteriorated and that she had been transferred to a nearby hospital. On 10 May, she was transferred to hospital in Tehran. On May 18, 2026, she was released from hospital and sent home.

== Personal life ==
In 1998, Mohammadi married pro-reform journalist Taghi Rahmani. She gave birth to twins in 2006. The couple was ordered not to live in Tehran and, for their safety, lived at other people's homes in various cities. In 2012, after serving 14 years in prison, Rahmani moved to France with the children, while Mohammadi remained to continue her human rights work.

== Honors and awards ==
In October 2023, while in prison, Mohammadi was awarded the 2023 Nobel Peace Prize "for her fight against the oppression of women in Iran and her fight to promote human rights and freedom for all". The text of her Nobel acceptance speech, which was smuggled out of prison, was read at the awards ceremony in Oslo by her teenage children, Ali and Kiana Rahmani. While the President of the United States, Joe Biden, congratulated her, the Iranian High Council for Human Rights and the Ministry of Foreign Affairs of Iran condemned the decision to award Mohammadi the prize.

Other awards received by Mohammadi include:

- 2009: Alexander Langer Award, named for peace activist Alexander Langer. The award carried a 10,000-euro honorarium.
- 2011: Per Anger Prize, the Swedish government's international award for human rights
- 2016: Human Rights Award of the City of Weimar
- 2018: Andrei Sakharov Prize from the American Physical Society
- 2022: Prize for Press Freedom from Reporters Without Borders
- 2022: Recognition as one of BBC's 100 inspiring and influential women
- 2023: Olof Palme Prize from the Swedish Olof Palme Foundation, jointly with Marta Chumalo and Eren Keskin
- 2023: PEN/Barbey Freedom to Write Award from PEN America
- 2023: UNESCO/Guillermo Cano World Press Freedom Prize, Shared with Elaheh Mohammadi and Niloofar Hamedi.
- 2024: Cinema for Peace Honorary Award.
- On May 21, 2026, the City of Paris, as part of its "human rights diplomacy and support for freedom-seeking activists", awarded Mohammadi honorary citizenship.

== Works ==
- White Torture: Interviews with Iranian Women Prisoners. OneWorld Publications, 2022. ISBN 978-0-861-54550-6
- Eine Frau hört niemals auf zu kämpfen. btb, September 2026, ISBN 978-3-442-76366-5
- Une femme ne renonce jamais - Notre combat pour la liberté, la démocratie et les droits humains en Iran. ISBN 978-2-221-28864-1
- Una donna non si arrende mai: La nostra battaglia per la libertà, la democrazia e i diritti umani in Iran. ISBN 978-8-829-79447-8

== See also ==
- List of Iranian women activists
