= National Council for Peace =

- Formation: 19 November 2007
- Founded at: Tehran, Iran
- President: Narges Mohammadi
- Deputy President: Isa Saharkhiz
- Spokesperson: Abdolfattah Soltani
- Treasurer: Hossein Shah-Hosseini

The National Council for Peace (Persian: شورای ملی صلح) is an Iranian anti-war and pro-human rights organization founded in 2007, with an aim to oppose military action against Iran amidst threats by U.S. administration under George W. Bush.

It was a broad coalition of Iranian activists, political leaders, lawyers, artists, students and others who protested against a potential war between Iran and the United States. According to Iranian lawyer and human rights advocate Leila Alikarimi, the group straightened the voice of Iranian civil society by calling for an open dialogue with the Iranian government to enhance the situation of human rights in Iran.

== See also ==
- List of anti-war organizations
