= Abolfazl Ghadyani =

Iranian academic and political reformist

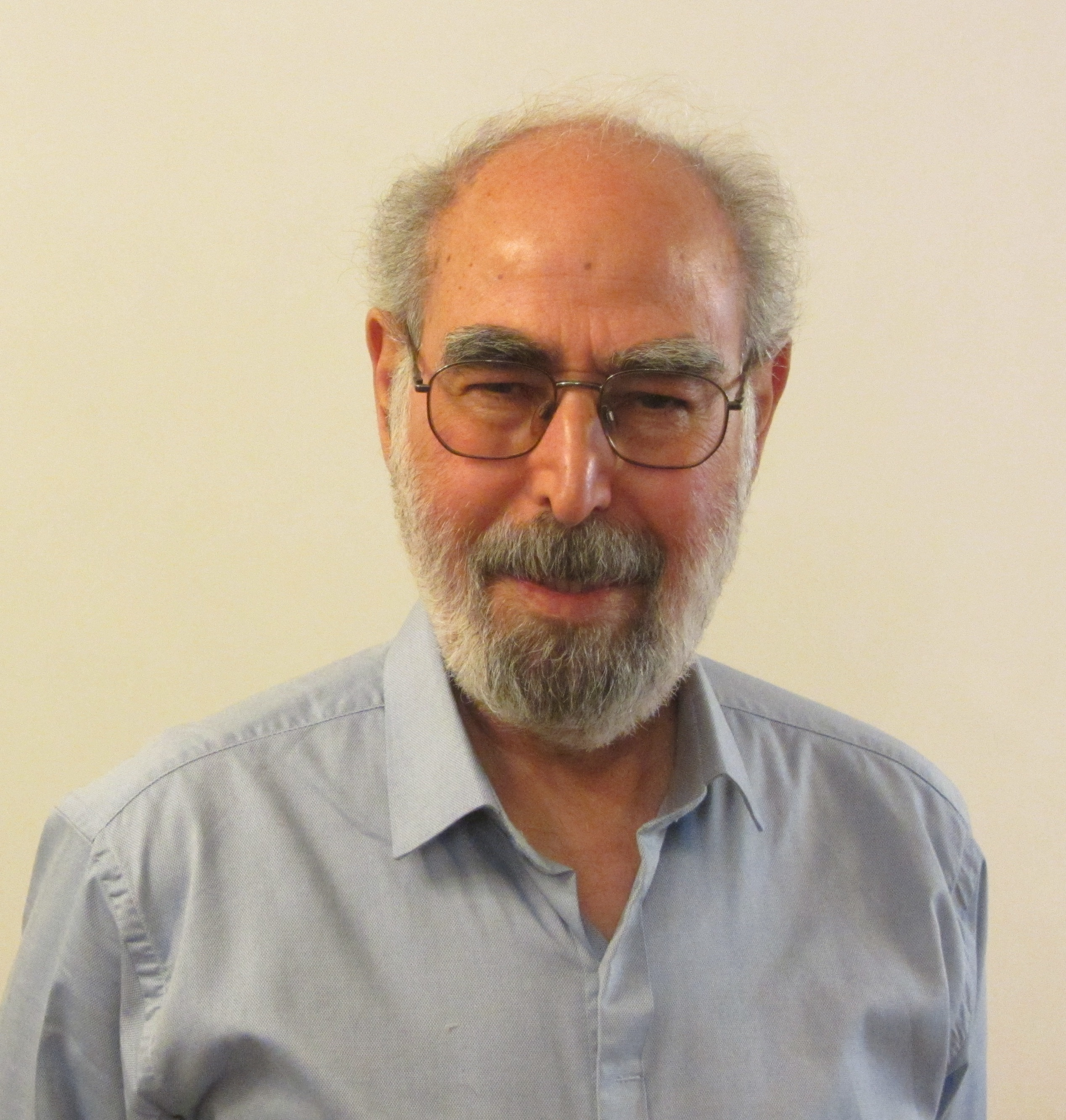

Abolfazl Ghadyani (Persian: ابوالفضل قدیانی; born 1945) is a senior member of the Mojahedin of the Islamic Revolution of Iran Organization.

== Politician ==
According to Hamid Dabashi, professor of Iranian Studies at Columbia University, Ghadyani is an anti-authoritarian "Muslim Revolutionary."

== Repression ==
Ghadyani was jailed and tortured during the Mohammad Reza Pahlavi monarchy, and, as of 2012, is imprisoned by the authorities of the Islamic Republic of Iran for publicly challenging the veracity of the 2009 Iranian presidential election. On January 14, 2013 Ghadyani was transferred to the Ghezel Hesar prison from Evin prison in Tehran. He has been a strong critic of Supreme Leader Ali Khamenei and, as part of his jail sentence, was ordered to hand-copy three books in favor of Khamenei and the Islamic Republic.

== January 2026 public statement ==
On 28 January 2026, Ghadyani, along with several other Iranian intellectuals, including Amirsalar Davoudi, Hatam Ghaderi, Mehdi Mahmoudian, Abdollah Momeni, Mohammad Najafi, Jafar Panahi, Mohammad Rasoulof, Nasrin Sotoudeh, and Sedigheh Vasmaghi, and the Narges Mohammadi Human Rights Foundation, published a statement on Instagram asserting that the 2026 Iran massacres were a crime against humanity, accusing Supreme Leader of Iran Ali Khamenei of holding principal responsibility.
