= Seifzadeh =

Seifzadeh is a surname. Notable people with the surname include:

- Hossein Seifzadeh (born 1950), Iranian political scientist
- Mohammad Seifzadeh (born 1948), Iranian lawyer and human rights activist
