= Sedigheh Vasmaghi =

Iranian Islamic scholar and writer

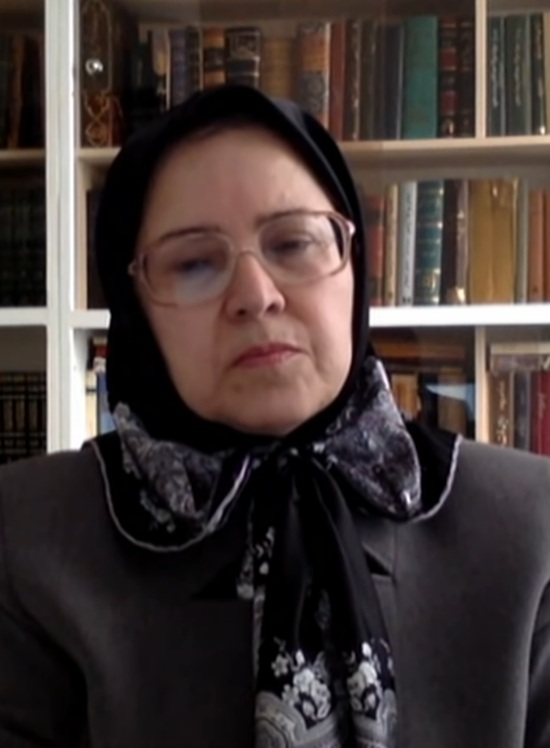
- Vasmaghi in November 2019

Member of City Council of Tehran
- In office 29 April 1999 – 15 January 2003
- Majority: 210,303 (14.98%)

Personal details
- Born: صدیقه وسمقی; 1961 (age 64–65) Tehran, Iran
- Party: Islamic Iran Participation Front
- Education: University of Tehran

Sedigheh Vasmaghi (Persian: صدیقه وسمقی, born 1961) is an Iranian lawyer, poet, and reformist politician. From 1999 to 2003, she was a member of the City Council of Tehran and served as the first spokesperson of the council. She is described as a "post-Islamist activist and intellectual".

== Public statements ==
In April 2023, Vasmaghi addressed an open letter to Iranian Supreme Leader Ali Khamenei where she affirmed that the Quran does not justify the obligation to wear the hijab.

In a statement signed by 15 religious intellectuals on 1 July 2023, Vasmaghi supported Abdolhamid Ismaeelzahi, a Sunni cleric at risk of repression because of his criticism against the Iranian government during the Mahsa Amini protests.

On 28 January 2026, Vasmaghi, along with several other Iranian intellectuals, including Amirsalar Davoudi, Hatam Ghaderi, Abolfazl Ghadyani, Mehdi Mahmoudian, Abdollah Momeni, Mohammad Najafi, Jafar Panahi, Mohammad Rasoulof, and Nasrin Sotoudeh, and the Narges Mohammadi Human Rights Foundation, published a statement on Instagram asserting that the 2026 Iran massacres were a crime against humanity, accusing Supreme Leader of Iran Ali Khamenei of holding principal responsibility.

Civic offices
New title Council founded	Spokesperson of the City Council of Tehran; 1999–2003	Succeeded by Mehdi Chamran
