= Abdollah Momeni =

Iranian student leader and activist

Abdollah Momeni (Persian: عبدالله مؤمنی; born 31 June 1977 in Kuhdasht) is an Iranian student leader and activist. He became involved in the movement in the July 1999 protests, when large numbers of students across the country protested the abolition of pro-reform newspaper Salam. Abdollah Momeni worked as a longtime spokesman of the Alumni Association of Iran (Advar-e Tahkim Vahdat) organization, which focuses on enforcement of democracy and human rights protection.

== August 2009 arrest ==
He was arrested during protests after the election in June 2009, and later sentenced to eight years in prison for his presence at post-election gatherings and activities against national security. According to witness statements, Momeni was subjected to abusive treatment in prison.

After five years of imprisonment he was released on March 13, 2014.

== International attention ==
For his efforts in the field of human rights advocacy, Momeni was awarded the 2009 Homo Homini Award by People in Need. He shared the prize with Majid Tavakoli, another student activist leader. Amnesty International named him a prisoner of conscience and called for his release.

== Accusation by the Justice Department in the United States ==
Momeni was accused to be part of a conspiracy that "deceived U.S. companies, illegally obtained sensitive U.S. items, and transshipped those items through the UAE to Iran in violation of U.S. law." In response, he published an announcement stating that:

"During my cooperation with the company, several orders for the supply of goods was referred to Mr. Arash Yousefi Jam, who was independently doing business in Canada, and he bought some of these goods and then sold them to the company I cooperated with. It should be mentioned that I know Mr. Yousefi Jam since his several months of imprisonment in the Political ward of Evin prison. He immigrated to Canada after his release. Moreover, the purchase of all those goods and spare parts, which are mostly being purchased on famous online shops like Amazon and eBay, were not subject to any special terms or conditions (including IEEPA or ITSR). None of those goods are among Dual-use products. In summary, the introduction of Mr. Yousefi Jam as an Iranian citizen living in Canada, who has been engaged in business, to an Iranian company is all I have done in the company.

I, Abdollah Momeni, consider myself a pro-democracy activist committed to the national sovereignty and independence of my own country, and I have always opposed the imposing of unilateral economic sanctions by the US government or any other government on Iran, which inevitably makes life difficult for the people of my country. I consider the sanctions an example of oppression against the Iranian nation and violation of the rights of Iranian citizens. Moreover, I have repeatedly stated these beliefs in my personal or collective stances and statements."

== January 2026 public statement and arrest ==
On 28 January 2026, Momeni, along with several other Iranian intellectuals, including Amirsalar Davoudi, Hatam Ghaderi, Abolfazl Ghadyani, Mehdi Mahmoudian, Mohammad Najafi, Jafar Panahi, Mohammad Rasoulof, Nasrin Sotoudeh, and Sedigheh Vasmaghi, and the Narges Mohammadi Human Rights Foundation, published a statement on Instagram asserting that the 2026 Iran massacres were a crime against humanity, accusing Supreme Leader of Iran Ali Khamenei of holding principal responsibility. On 31 January, Momani, along with two other signatories, Mehdi Mahmoudian and Vida Rabbani, were arrested by the Iranian authories. They were released on bail on 17 February.
