= White Torture (book) =

2022 book about women in Evin Prison

- Author: Narges Mohammadi
- Subject: Imprisonment and torture of women in Evin Prison, Tehran
- Genre: Non-fiction, memoir
- Publisher: Oneworld Publications
- Publication date: 13 December 2022
- Pages: 272
- ISBN: 978-0861545506

White Torture is a 2022 non-fiction book by Iran human rights activist Narges Mohammadi, featuring interviews with 14 Iranian women prisoners who were subjected to human rights violations during their imprisonment in Evin Prison. The book documents both the psychological and physical abuse these women endured during their imprisonment. Mohammadi is a Nobel Peace Prize winner who had been imprisoned in Evin herself. She brings to light how the Islamic Republic's prisons systematically violate human rights

A documentary film based on the book was released in 2021.

== Summary ==
The term "white torture" refers to a form of psychological abuse where detainees are held in completely white, soundproof cells, deprived of human contact, natural light, and sensory stimuli. This method aims to erode the individual's sense of self and reality. In her book, Mohammadi shares her own experiences alongside the 14 women interviewed and other prisoners, including prominent figures like Nazanin Zaghari-Ratcliffe. The book focuses on Ward 209, a section within Evin prison in Tehran, where the Ministry of Intelligence conducts interrogations of women. The accounts from these women expose the reality of repression under the Islamic Republic, where individuals are frequently incarcerated due to their political and religious beliefs, activism, or associations and are subjected to conditions designed to crush their will and spirit.

The women imprisoned in Evin have no access to natural light. Their cells are brightly lit 24/7, and they are unable to differ night from day. The conditions are deplorable, with some cells plagued by unsanitary conditions, including toilets that double as wash basins and blocked drains. The foul stench of the environment causes respiratory issues for the detainees, and in one instance, a Baháʼí leader described her cell as infested with beetles, both dead and alive.

Physical and sexual violence was common during imprisonment. The interrogators repeatedly probe into the women's personal lives, often focusing on sexual matters. One woman described how her interrogator would stick dollar bills on her breasts, or rather use humiliation as a weapon, while another professes his affection, caressing her head covered by her chador. Many women live in fear that their captors will use hidden camera footage from the bathroom.

But the most insidious form of abuse is what Iran's Ministry of Intelligence refers to as "white torture". By isolating the prisoners in solitary confinement, their sensory experiences are cut off, leaving them mentally and emotionally vulnerable. After enduring this psychological strain for weeks, months, or even longer, even the presence of an interrogator can be soothing. The interrogations themselves can be grueling, sometimes lasting 17 hours a day for an entire month.

The interrogators wield complete control over their subjects’ fates, manipulating every aspect of their lives, from visitation rights to access to basic necessities. They withhold or provide things such as family visits, books, and soap at their discretion.

Despite the overwhelming pressure, these women refuse to break, with one woman walking 7 kilometers within the cramped confines of her cell each day. For many, the experience of incarceration became an unexpected spiritual journey. One woman likened it to a monastic retreat, and another found strength in a Nietzschean idea: "What doesn't kill you makes you stronger."

One interviewee, Hengameh Shahidi, explains that despite her release, she remains under medical treatment and has been unable to return to normal life due to the damage caused by prolonged isolation. Another, journalist Marzieh Amiri, describes how solitary confinement made her feel she was losing her sanity.

These stories of resilience provide insight into the current rebellion against Iran’s authoritarian regime. This book holds valuable evidence for any future legal efforts. If the regime falls, it could serve as critical testimony against those responsible. And just as Khamenei's ordeal helped shape his rise to power, the suffering endured by these women may eventually propel them to positions of influence in a future Iran.

== Reception ==
White Torture has been widely acclaimed for its unflinching portrayal of state-sanctioned cruelty. The Economist expresses how much of the testimony evokes the cruelty of the Spanish Inquisition. The interrogators manipulate Islam as a weapon, accusing the women of immoral beliefs or sexual behavior. Some are charged with moharebeh, the capital offense of waging war against God, while others face accusations of "insulting the sacred."

The Guardian described it as a "disturbing" account that sheds light on the "solitary savagery" faced by political prisoners in Iran. The Irish Times noted that the book captures the profound isolation experienced by detainees, noting that the imprisoned women compared their existence to being "a human being in a can."

According to The Economist, the testimonies in White Torture could serve as key evidence in potential legal proceedings. The book includes the names of interrogators and officials involved in the abuse, which could play a crucial role in efforts to achieve justice.

White Torture was translated into German as Frauen! Leben! Freiheit! ("Women! Life! Freedom!") in 2023.

== About the author ==
Mohammadi is a prominent human rights advocate in Iran. Since 1998, she has been repeatedly imprisoned without justification by the regime of the Islamic Republic of Iran. Mohammadi continued her advocacy, even at the risk of further punishment. Her work not only brings attention to the plight of Iranian women, but also serves as a call to action for the international community to address human rights violations in Iran. In 2023, Mohammadi was awarded the Nobel Peace Prize for her advocacy.

Mohammadi writes that ironically she is about to go back to prison "This time I was found guilty because of the book you are holding in your hands - White Torture."

== Documentary film ==
In 2021, Gelareh Kakavand and Vahid Zarezadeh created a film documentary based on the book. The documentary delves into the experiences of individuals who served time in Evin Prison and endured isolation in stark, soundproof cells devoid of natural light and human contact. Through interviews with former detainees, the film sheds light on the profound psychological impact of such confinement, aiming to break the spirit without leaving visible scars.

Filmed during a brief period when Mohammadi was released from prison, the documentary faced significant challenges. Filmmakers operated covertly to avoid detection by Iranian authorities. Zarezadeh, was forced to flee Iran after being interrogated and beaten following the film release.

=== Global screenings ===
- Nobel Peace Center (Oslo, Norway)
- Human Rights Film Festival Berlin
- Roxie Theater (San Francisco, USA)

== See also ==
- Evin Prison
- Capital punishment in Iran
- Political repression in the Islamic Republic of Iran
- Human rights in Iran
