= Shariatism =

Iranian Islamic socialist ideology

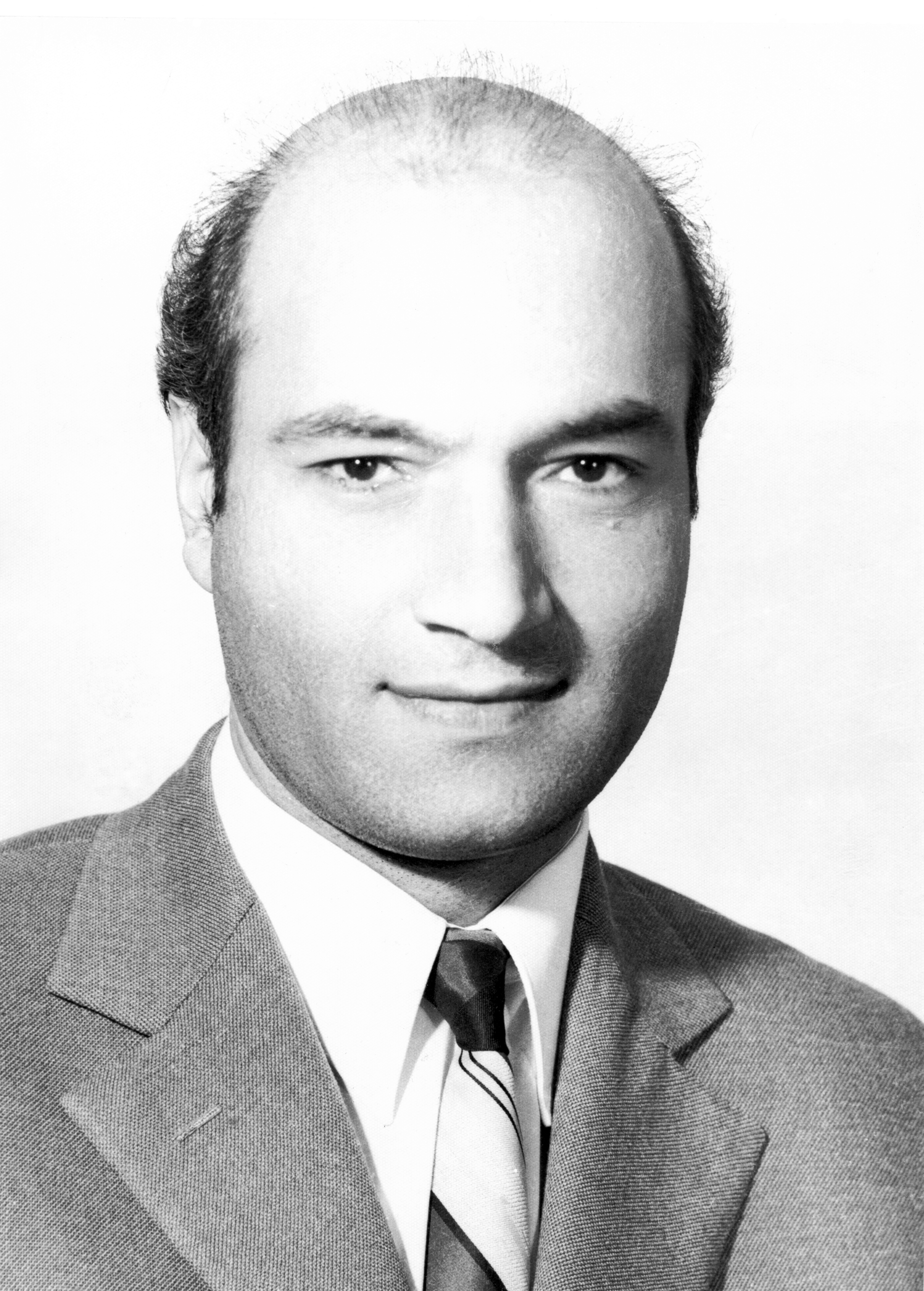
Ali Shariati, after whom Shariatism is named

Shariatism (Note: Persian: شریعتیسم, romanized: Šariatism) refers to the body of religious, social, and political ideas associated with the Iranian intellectual Ali Shariati (1933–1977). Shariati sought to reinterpret Shi'a Islam in response to modern social and political conditions, drawing on Islamic traditions alongside Western social and political thought. His thought emphasized social justice, human freedom, political and social responsibility, and opposition to imperialism and established forms of religious and political authority.

== Ideas ==
Shariati sought to reinterpret Shi'a Islam in response to modern social and political conditions. His thought combined Islamic concepts with ideas drawn from Western sociology, philosophy, socialism, and anti-colonial thought.

A central concern of Shariati's thought was social justice. He presented Islam as a religion committed to opposing oppression and social inequality and emphasized the responsibility of individuals to participate actively in transforming society. His interpretation of Islam placed particular importance on human freedom, social responsibility, and resistance to political and economic domination.

Shariati also sought to reinterpret Shi'a concepts in revolutionary terms. He distinguished between what he regarded as an authentic, liberating form of Islam and institutionalized or conservative interpretations. His conception of Shi'a Islam emphasized resistance to oppression and the moral responsibility to challenge injustice. He also regarded the intellectual as having a responsibility to interpret social conditions critically and to help awaken society to its political and moral responsibilities. His conception of the socially engaged intellectual was influenced by both Islamic traditions and modern European social thought.

== Neo-Shariatism ==
Neo-Shariatism is made up of a particular group of Shariati supporters who emerged in the 1990s, as a result of debates with post-Islamist intellectuals in Iran. According to neo-Shariatist views, the intellectual life of Shariati is divided into young and mature periods, separating his intrinsic and contingent ideas. Shariati is also considered an "unfinished project", meaning that "there is much unthought in Shariati's thought", and the burden to complete his project lies with the neo-Shariatist movement. There are two distinct trends in neo-Shariatism: one reads Shariati's works "phenomenologically within the intellectual context and horizon of his time and its impacts on the contemporary intellectual context and perspective", while the other tries to read Shariati within his "conceptual structure".

This current has been described as "by far the most courteous opposition" to the Islamic Republic government, which in turn "has never treated them with the respect they deserved".

== Criticism ==
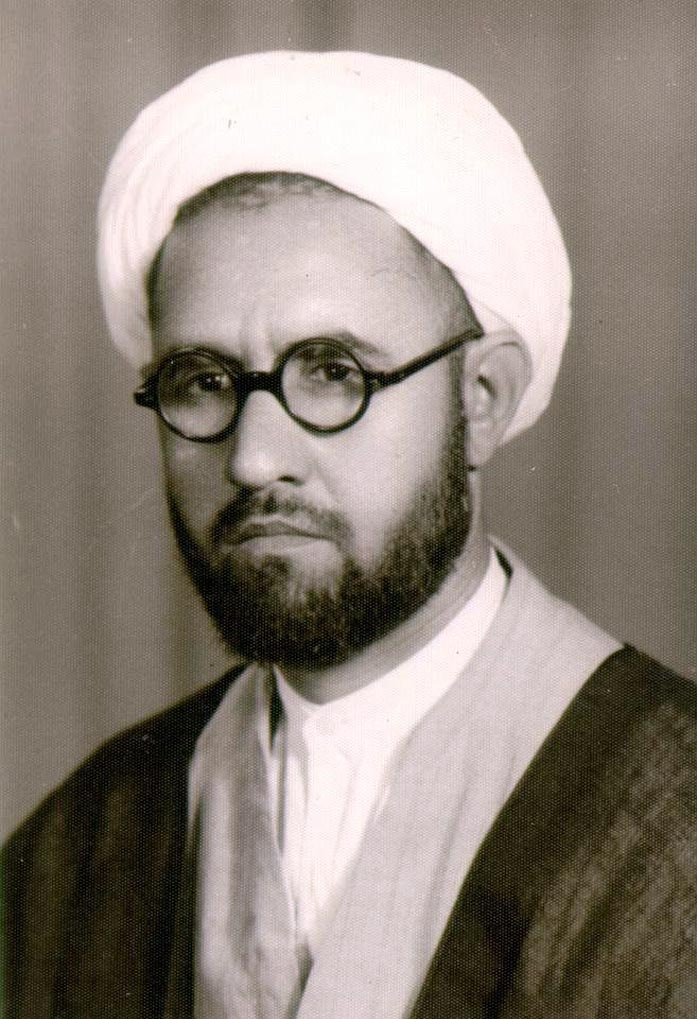
Morteza Motahari

Shariati's ideas faced strong opposition from conservative Shi'a clergy, who were among his earliest critics. Prominent contemporary preachers and orators (vo'az) such as Ahmad Kafi, Mohammad Taghi Falsafi, Javad Managhebi, Seyyed Ali-Naghi Tehrani, Haj Ashraf Kashani, Seyyed Ebrahim Milani, Qassem Eslami and Mohammad-Ali Ansari Qomi, accused Shariati of heresy, being a Sunni and even a Wahhabi and anti-Shia. By the early 1970s, a number of high-ranking clerics including Abu al-Qasim al-Khoei, Mohammad Hadi al-Milani, Mohammad Sadeq Rouhani and Muhammad Husayn Tabatabai had issued rulings against Shariati. Morteza Motahari who defended Shariati against Wahabbism and anti-Shia accusations, himself became a staunch critic of Shariati. He maintained that Shariati was inspired more by the theory of historical materialism than by Islam and found his view on Islam facile, divergent and sacrilegious and went further to refer to him as "damned person" (mal'un) quit Hosseiniyeh Ershad in protest to Shariati's lectures held there.

Seyyed Hossein Nasr, a traditionalist thinker associated with the Pahlavi dynasty, opposed Shariati not only because of his anti-establishment views, but also due to his modernist outlook. Nasr accused Shariati of being a "subversive Islamic-Marxist attempting to infiltrate the ranks of religious forces" and in 1970 resigned from his position in Hosseiniyeh Ershad in response to Shariati comparing the third Shi'ite Imam Husayn ibn Ali with Che Guevara.

Abdolkarim Soroush maintains that the ideas of Shariati could be interpreted as "reducing Islam to a totalitarian ideology".

== Influences ==
The first person to influence Shariati was his father Mohammad-Taghi, as he describes:

My father, the first builder of the first dimensions of my soul! The person who, for the first time, taught me both the art of thinking, and the art of being a human being (ensan budan), [He] poured into my mouth the taste of freedom, honor (sharaf), continence (pakdamani), dignity (menaat), purity of spirit (effat-e-rouh), and the steadfastness, faith and independence of heart, immediately after my mother weened me.

Another person was Abolhassan Foroughi, who Shariati studied under his guidance for a short period of time, but with a deep impact. During his youth, he was also strongly inspired by Mohammad Mosaddegh, his neutralist foreign policy doctrine and the Movement of God-Worshipping Socialists which supported Mosaddegh.

In an article entitled My Idols, Shariati eulogized his self-described teachers. He names sixteen contemporary individuals and thirteen historical figures who have influenced him. Among the latter are prophets of Abrahamic religions: Abraham, Moses, Jesus and Muhammad. Shariati also praised the house of the latter: Ali and his wife Fatimah, and their son Husayn and daughter Zaynab. Others in the list are Socrates and Buddha, as well as Ayn al-Quzat Hamadani, Hallaj and Suhrawardi.

During his time in France, Shariati was exposed to new ideas which influenced his world outlook. Among his contemporary influences, Shariati names Louis Massignon (with whom he had worked), Georges Gurvitch (who he hailed as "world's genius of sociology"), Frantz Fanon (a friend of his), Alexis Carrel, Jean-Paul Sartre, Jacques Berque, Albert Schweitzer, Claude Bernard, Henri Lefebvre, René Guénon, Jean Cocteau and Kateb Yacine. Shariati mentions a "fanatic Catholic" he had met, Solange Bodin, from whom he had learnt "the art of seeing". He says Bodin unknowingly made a spiritual impact on him with her premature death, which was quite traumatic to him. He also lists individuals such as Carola Grabert and Jacquline Chezel who had toured him in arts and that part of his intellectual formation came from artistic appreciation, citing paintings of Picasso, Chagall, van Gogh, Tintoretto and Lacroix as his favorites.

According to Ervand Abrahamian, Shariati was interested in studying Western orientalism, French sociology and radical Catholic theology (in particular liberation theology). He read Esprit magazine, which he had been familiarized to by Louis Massignon, and attended lectures of Raymond Aron, Roger Garaudy, Georges Politzer and Georges Gurvitch, among others.

Kürşad Atalar compares Shariati with Algazelus with regard to their shared view on the duty of being a "responsible intellectual" and a "truth seeker". He also maintains that Shariati's positions was in line with Muhammad Iqbal (who Shariati regarded a "responsible intellectual").

Shariati was influenced by Mahmoud Taleghani's ideas.

Some scholars have connected views of Shariati to others like Friedrich Nietzsche, Michel Foucault and Edward Said.

== Legacy ==
Shariati became one of the most influential Iranian intellectuals of the 20th century. His writings and lectures contributed to the development of revolutionary Islamic thought in Iran and influenced a generation of activists and intellectuals before and after the Iranian Revolution. His ideas were particularly influential among students and intellectuals, and his works continued to circulate after his death.

His writings also influenced intellectual and political movements in Afghanistan, Pakistan, Turkey, Indonesia, Malaysia, and South Africa.

=== Organizations influenced by Shariati ===
- People's Mojahedin Organization of Iran
- Anti-Capitalist Muslims

=== People influenced by Shariati ===
Figures who are regarded to have been influenced by thoughts of Shariati, include:

- Abolhassan Banisadr
- Mir-Hossein Mousavi
- Mohammad Hanifnejad
- Gholam-Abbas Tavassoli
- Hashem Aghajari
- Zahra Rahnavard
- Tahereh Saffarzadeh
- Majid Sharif
- Maghsoud Farasatkhah
- Mohammad-Amin Ghaneirad
- Mahathir Mohamad
- Ezzatollah Sahabi
- Habibollah Peyman
- Jean-Paul Sartre
- Abdulaziz Sachedina
- Amien Rais
- Suroosh Irfani
- Chandra Muzaffar
- Latif Pedram
- İhsan Eliaçık
- Ehsan Shariati (neo-Shariatist)
- Sara Shariati (neo-Shariatist)
- Susan Shariati (neo-Shariatist)
- Hasan Yousefi Eshkevari (neo-Shariatist)
- Taghi Rahmani (neo-Shariatist)
- Bijan Abdolkarimi (neo-Shariatist)
- Ahmad Zeidabadi (neo-Shariatist)
- Narges Mohammadi (neo-Shariatist)
- Reza Alijani (neo-Shariatist)

=== Outside Iran ===
==== Arab world ====
Many of Shariati's works has been translated into Arabic in Lebanon, where he is a widely-known and controversial figure with mixed reception. In Tunisia, Shariati's works are among those read and circulated by Ennahda Movement. Members of Morocco's banned organization, Islamic Choice, were interested in works of Shia thinkers such as like Shariati.

==== Afghanistan ====
In Afghanistan, Shariati is well-known, particularly among Hazara people. Many leaders of Nasr group were influenced by Shariati's thoughts.

==== South-East Asia ====
Since 1989, IQRA Press has published translations of Shariati's works both in Bahasa Melayu and English in Malaysia, where figures such as Chandra Muzaffar and Jomo Kwame Sundaram have hailed Shariati as a "martyr". In Indonesia, Shariati is among foreign Muslim thinkers whose ideas have made a strong intellectual impact, appealing to students and young intellectuals.

==== Pakistan ====
Shariat's most important books have been translated to Urdu and published in Pakistan. In 2020, Pakistan's Prime Minister Imran Khan quoted Shariati to pay tribute to Iqbal and shared the article in his Twitter account.

==== Turkey ====
Some books of Shariati have been translated into Turkish. Shariati serves as the "chief influence" on the organization Anti-Capitalist Muslims. According to Georg Leube, Shariati's post-modern literary style which "blurred the lines between transmission, critique and original thought", can be seen in The Black Book of Orhan Pamuk, although it is unknown whether Pamuk have read the works of Shariati or is actually influenced by them.

==== South Africa ====
The Muslim community in South Africa was not familiar with Shariati until 1979, when Iranian revolutionary books and magazines were flowing into the country. It has been suggested that youth organizations such as the Muslim Youth Movement of South Africa (MYMSA), the Arabic Study Circle (based in Durban) and the Muslim Teachers' Association (in Cape Town), as well as Qibla which borrowed some of the concepts in his works.

== See also ==
- Intellectual movements in Iran
- Religious intellectualism in Iran
