= Emadeddin Baghi =

Iranian journalist (b. 1962)

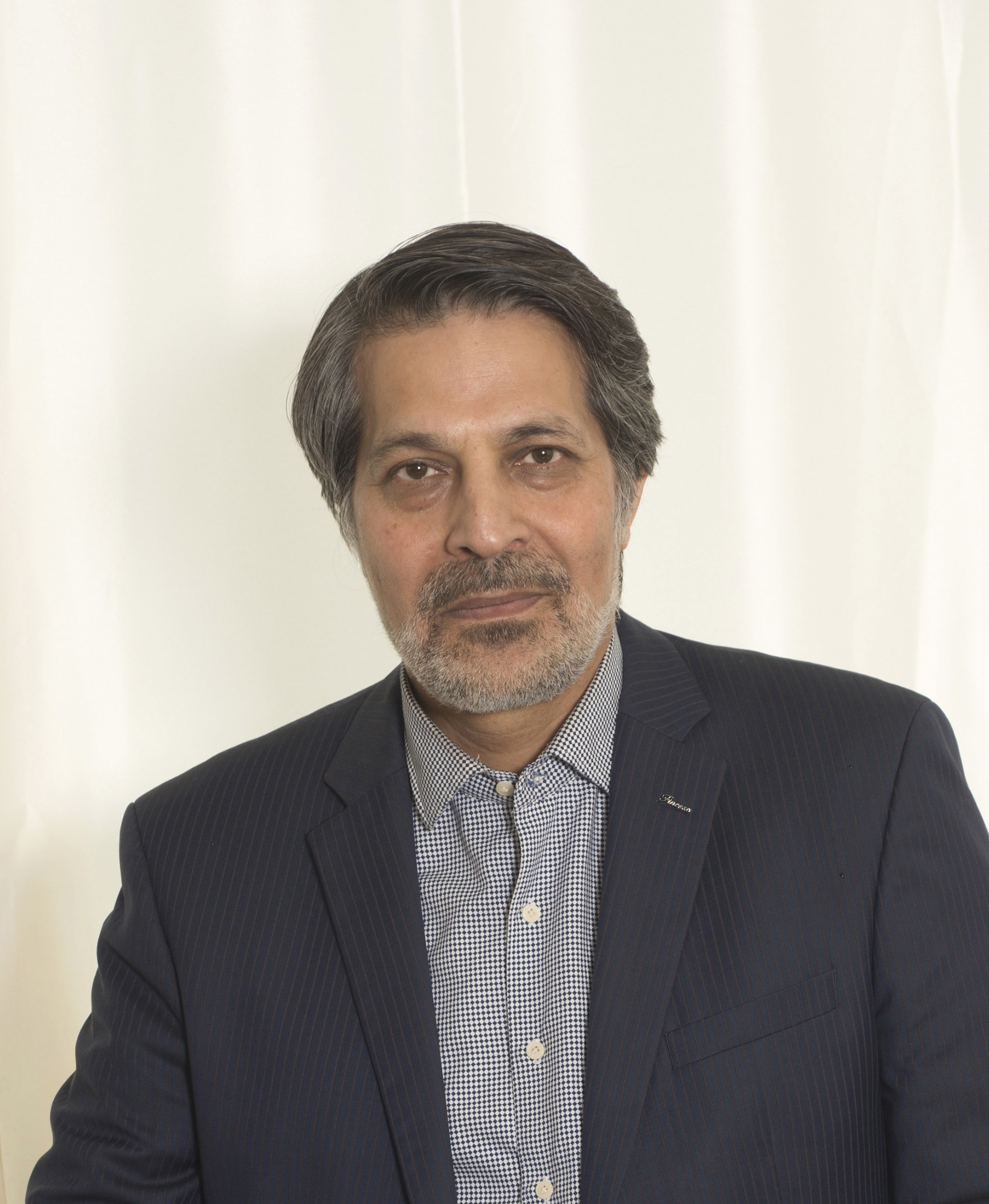
- Baghi in 2018
- Born: 25 April 1962 (age 64); Shahreza, Isfahan province, Imperial State of Iran
- Occupations: Journalist, human rights activist
- Known for: Dissident journalism, imprisonment
- Spouse: Fatemeh Kamali Ahmadsarai
- Children: 3 daughters
- Relatives: Mohammad Ghouchani (son-in-law)
- Awards: Civil Courage Prize (2004); Martin Ennals Award (2009)
- Website: Official website

Emadeddin Baghi (Persian: عمادالدین باقی; born 25 April 1962) is an Iranian journalist, human rights activist, prisoners' rights advocate, investigative journalist, theologian and writer. He is the founder and head of the Committee for the Defense of Prisoners' Rights and the Society of Right to Life Guardians in Iran, and the author of twenty books, six of which have been banned in Iran. Baghi was imprisoned in connection with his writings on the Chain Murders of Iran, which occurred in Autumn 1998, and imprisoned again in late 2007 for another year on charges of "acting against national security." According to his family and lawyers, Baghi has been summoned to court 23 times since his release in 2003. He has also had his passport confiscated, his newspaper closed, and suspended prison sentences passed against his wife and daughter. Baghi was rearrested on 28 December 2009 on charges related to an interview with Grand Ayatollah Hussein-Ali Montazeri. Baghi was released and then again rearrested on 5 December 2010.

== Early life ==
Baghi was born in 1962. In the years leading up to the 1979 Iranian Revolution, he began to participate as a political activist as an Islamic Reformist, under the mentorship of Ayatollah Hussein-Ali Montazeri. After the revolution, he studied theology and sociology in Qom and Tehran, respectively. His journalism career started in 1983, and by the 1990s, Baghi was working as the chief editor of the reformist newspaper Faith.

== Journalism ==
Baghi and Akbar Ganji are credited with uncovering the responsibility of Iranian security personnel for the Chain Murders, in which a number of dissident intellectuals were found murdered, apparently by a serial killer. Baghi and Ganji both argued that orders for the murders came from high in the Iranian government.

Two newspapers at which Baghi worked were banned by the Iranian government: Faith in 2000, and Joumhouriat in 2003. His books on the Chain Murders were also banned.

Baghi has also written extensively about the death penalty, of which he is an active opponent. The United Nations and other international human rights groups have relied heavily his work, particularly on juveniles sentenced to death, for their own reports. Baghi estimates that more than 10,000 people have been executed in Iran since the Islamic Revolution.

== Arrests ==
Emadeddin Baghi has been arrested several times by the government of Iran on charges described by international human rights organizations as politically motivated.

In 2000, he was charged with "endangering national security" for his writings about the Chain Murders in the late 1990s. He was sentenced to three years' imprisonment by Revolutionary Court on charges brought by the intelligence ministry and state television. His newspaper Faith was also banned and two of its editors also imprisoned. He served two years of that sentence, and one year was suspended.

In 2003, Judge Babayee of Branch 6 of the Revolutionary Court gave Baghi a one-year suspended term for "endangering national security" and "printing lies" in his book, The Tragedy of Democracy in Iran. Baghi received another one-year prison sentence for "acting against national security" on 15 October 2007, when he was summoned by Tehran's revolutionary court on the charges of "propaganda against the Islamic Republic" and "divulging state secret information". The Islamic Republic News Agency quoted an official who stated, "Baghi was doing his activities against national security under the cover of defending prisoners' rights".

Baghi's imprisonment was condemned by Iranian Nobel Peace Prize laureate Shirin Ebadi and by the Paris-based Reporters Without Borders. Amnesty International designated him a prisoner of conscience and campaigned for his release.

Baghi was among the numerous journalists and reformists detained by the government of Iran on 28 December 2009 in the wake of clashes between demonstrators and police at the Ashura protests. In August 2010, Baghi was sentenced to a year's imprisonment and a five-year ban on political activity. On 22 September, opposition websites reported that Baghi had been sentenced to an additional six years' imprisonment for "propaganda against the state" and other charges for having broadcast an interview with dissident cleric Hossein Ali Montazeri on BBC Persian. Amnesty International again named him a prisoner of conscience.

Five years of the sentence was later overturned by an appeals court, and Baghi was released on in June 2011. In the months prior to his release, he and other prisoners went on a hunger strike to protest the deaths of dissidents Haleh Sahabi and Hoda Saber

== Homophobic views ==
On 27 January 2021, Emadeddin Baghi called a Conchita Wurst's photo "disgusting" on Twitter. Later in the same thread, he compared homosexual people with murderers and argued while homosexuals are disgusting, one can still defend their rights. Many Iranian scholars and activists reacted to his tweets, and argued that Emadeddin Baghi is a homophobic person who is not credible to be called a human rights activist. On 28 January 2021, Emadeddin Baghi's Twitter account was suspended due to his homophobic tweets.

== Organizations ==
Emadeddin Baghi founded two Iranian nongovernmental organizations — the Society for the Defense of Prisoners' Rights in 2003, and the Society of Right to Life Guardians in 2005. The two organizations produce reports on the situation of Iranian prisoners and gather data about death penalty cases in Iran.

== Awards and recognition ==
Baghi was awarded the Civil Courage Prize in 2004, sharing it with Zimbabwean opposition politician Lovemore Madhuku. However, he was prohibited from leaving Iran to accept it. The following year he won a human rights award from the French government.

In 2009, Baghi won the Martin Ennals Award for Human Rights Defenders. This award is given annually in Geneva by a coalition of 10 international human rights organizations, including Amnesty International, Human Rights Watch and Front Line, to a leading defender of human rights who is currently in danger. The Iranian government again denied Baghi permission to attend the award ceremony.

== See also ==
- Censorship in Iran
- Human rights in the Islamic Republic of Iran

== Family ==
Baghi is married to Fatemeh Kamali Ahmad Sarahi, with whom he has three daughters, including Maryam Baghi. In 2007, the two were given three-year suspended sentences and five years' probation for attending human rights training in Dubai three years before.
