= Reza Alijani =

Iranian journalist

- Born: 1961 or 1962 (age 64–65); Qazvin, Iran
- Political party: Council of Nationalist-Religious Activists of Iran
- Spouse: Parvin Bakhtiarinejad
- Children: 2
- Awards: Reporters Without Borders Prize (2001)
- Website: rezaalijani.com

Reza Alijani (Persian: رضا علیجانی) is an Iranian journalist, writer and nationalist-religious activist.

Alijani has been described as "Neo-Shariatist" and a leading post-Islamist intellectual figure.

Alijani has spent years in jail since 1980s. Amnesty International has designated him a prisoner of conscience.

He has been the editor of Iran-e-Farda before it was banned in 2000.
