= Mohammad Ali Dadkhah =

Iranian human rights lawyer

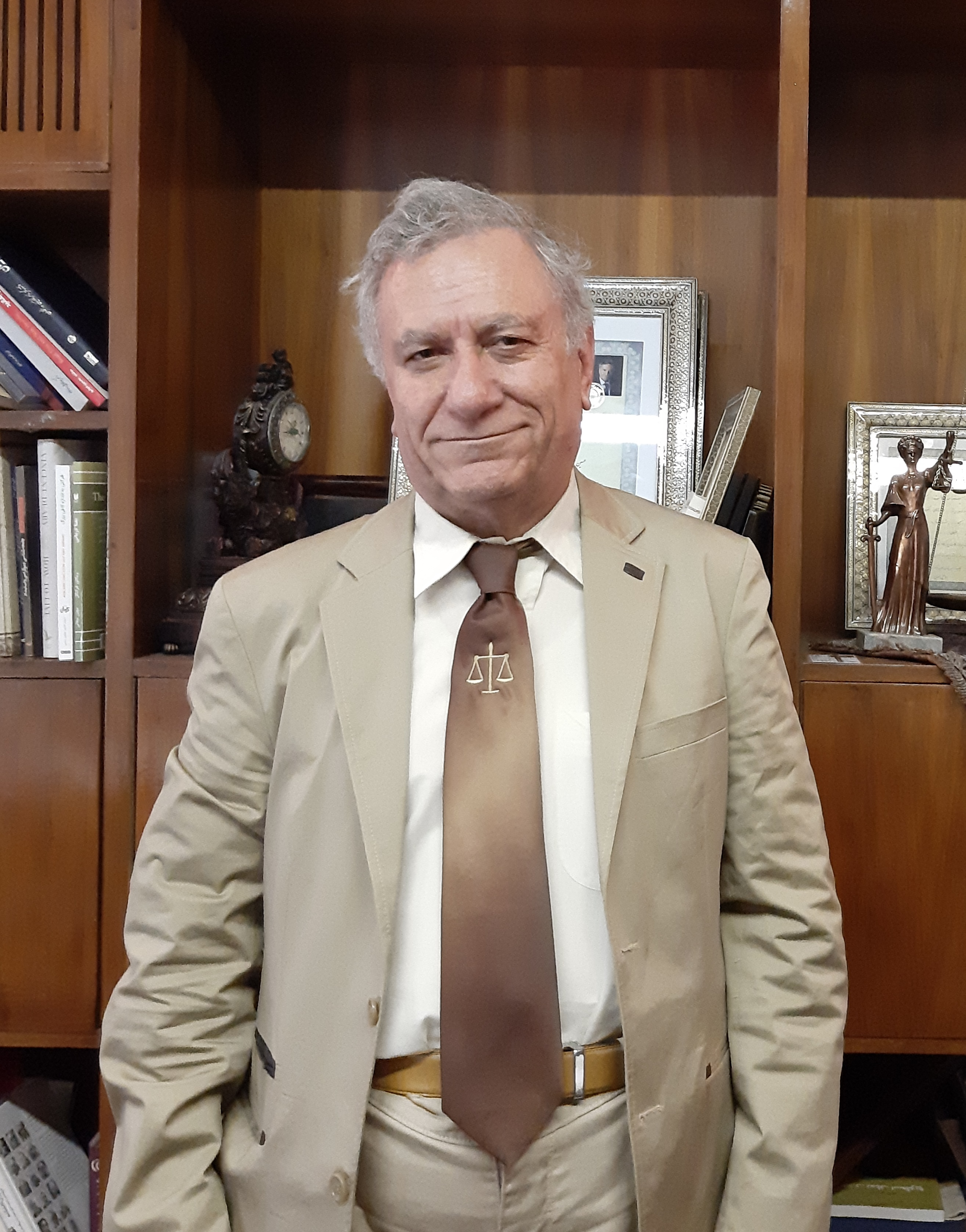
- 2019
- Occupation: Human rights lawyer

Seyed Mohammad Ali Dadkhah is an Iranian human rights lawyer. He is a co-founder of the Defenders of Human Rights Center (DHRC), which has been repressed by the Iranian government. In the aftermath of Iran's disputed June 2009 elections, Dadkhah represented several jailed political and human rights activists. In July 2011, he was sentenced by the Iranian judiciary to nine years in prison for attempting to overthrow the ruling system, among other charges. His sentence was upheld in April 2012, and on 29 September, he was called to prison to begin his sentence.

== Legal and human rights activities ==
=== Pre-June 2009 elections ===
Alongside Shirin Ebadi, Dadkhah was one of the original co-founders of the Defenders of Human Rights Center, which was forcibly closed by Iranian authorities in December 2008. In 2008, due to his activities as a human rights activist, Dadkhah was disqualified from standing for Iran's Central Board of the Bar Association.

Dadkhah represented Iranian-American student Esha Momeni, who was detained in Iran in October 2008 while doing research in the country. Dadkhah was denied access to his client, who was jailed in infamous Section 209 of Evin Prison. She was eventually released and allowed to return to the U.S. in August 2009.

=== Post-June 2009 elections ===
Following the disputed June 2009 presidential elections and the ensuing crackdown on protesters, Dadkhah provided legal representations to hundreds of detainees. His clients would come to include Youcef Nadarkhani, the Iranian Christian pastor facing death for apostasy against Islam, as well as Ebrahim Yazdi, the former leader of the banned Freedom Movement of Iran.

On 8 July 2009, Iranian authorities arrested Dadkhah at his offices. In September 2009 he was released after posting bail of $500,000.

In July 2011, Dadkhah was sentenced to nine years in jail and a ten-year ban on practicing law and teaching. His charges included being a member of an organization (the DHRC) seeking the "soft overthrow of the government" and "spreading propaganda against the system through interviews with foreign media." Dadkhah said he would appeal the conviction.

On 28 April 2012, while in court defending one of his clients, Dadkhah was informed by the judge Abolghasem Salavat, also known as the "Judge of Death" for his harsh sentencing of those convicted of political and religious offenses, that Dadkhah's sentence had been upheld and that he would shortly be summoned to jail. He was summoned to Evin Prison on 28 September 2012 to begin his sentence.

== See also ==
- Nasrin Sotoudeh
