= Anti-Capitalist Muslims =

Political organisation in Turkey

Association for Struggle Against Capitalism Kapitalizmle Mücadele Derneği Antikapitalist Müslümanlar
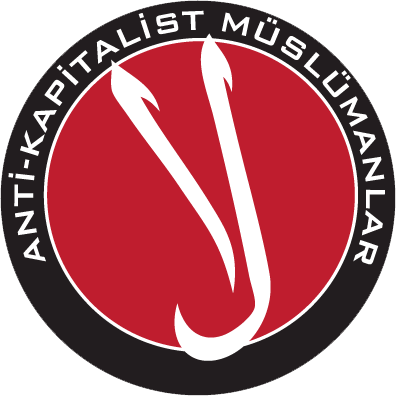
- Logo of the organization with stylized ا (alif) and ل (lâm) letters in the middle, meaning "No" in Arabic as in "No to Capitalism" as well as being the first word of the tawhid.
- Leader: İhsan Eliaçık
- Founded: 2012
- Headquarters: Istanbul
- Ideology: Anti-capitalism; Islamic socialism Shariatism
- Religion: Islam
- Slogan: All property belongs to God alone

The Anti-Capitalist Muslims (Turkish: Antikapitalist Müslümanlar), also known by their official name Association for Struggle Against Capitalism (Turkish: Kapitalizmle Mücadele Derneği), is a Turkish Islamic left-wing political organisation. They advocate a spiritual form of socialism, believing that the teachings of the Qur'an and Muhammad are not only compatible with but actively promote the leftist principles of equality and distributism, drawing inspiration from the early Medina welfare state. They challenged right-wing Muslims to read the Quran and "try to disprove the fact that it is leftist". They have on several occasions actively clashed with the Turkish police. The association initially gained fame for their involvement in the Gezi Park protests.

== Ideology ==
İhsan Eliaçık, the group's leader, believes that it is mandatory per Quranic verse 4:136 for all Muslims to donate everything they do not use. He stated in an interview that he believes the Islamic duty is not just caring for the poor but overthrowing the "capitalist devilish system" that he thinks makes them poor, "just like the Islamic prophets overthrew the devilish systems of their times". He continued by saying that they want a world without exploitation and privileges.

Eliaçık stated that many use Islam to advance their interests, and countries such as Saudi Arabia, Pakistan, and Afghanistan all interpret Islam with an "extreme understanding". When asked about secularism, he stated that classical secularism excludes the holy book and an alternative way can be found. He advocates for a "borderless world of peace". On evolution, he commented that it is a matter for science to discuss, not religion, and that Islam will never be proven wrong. On polygamy, he stated that the verses about polygamy are widely misunderstood and that Islam is strictly against the practice.

Eliaçık has been accused of being a communist; he responded to these claims by saying that they criticise capitalism on its essence while they criticise socialism by method. He says that while they agree with the fundamental teachings of socialism, they criticise the practical implementations, such as the political experiences of the Soviet Union.

== Manifesto ==
The organisation's manifesto, published in 2012, starts from the observation that "humanity is in need", that Mammon, the ancient deity of gold, has metaphorically returned as the god of capitalists in the modern times, and a Muslim should not take gods other than Allah. It follows, "Capitalism is the enemy of God. It is the enemy of humanity, of nature, of the poor, of the hungry, of the oppressed." The word "Muslim" is presented as being anti-capitalist by definition.

"Muslim" is our eternal universal name in all times and places. Muslim means those who accept the fact that all the property in the earth and in the heavens belongs to Allah, those who accept this, therefore those who do not disturb the peace in the natural order, and who want to maintain and sustain natural peace.

Our opposition to capitalism is a historical emphasis. Because Capitalism is the name of the cruel system that dominates our age. The message of each prophet stood against the prevailing tyrannical system of his time. For this, we emphasize "Anti-capitalism".

We consider every group established with the goal of anti-capitalism as our natural ally, regardless of their religious belief or disbelief, race, language, skin color, or ideology.

— Anticapitalist Muslims, The Manifesto

The manifesto cites the Quran as the only source. Ali Shariati serves as the "chief influence" on the organisation's ideology.

== Actions and positions ==
The organisation took part in the demonstrations of May 1 where, like other peaceful protesters, its members were the object of police repression and were taken into police custody. In 2012, a spokesperson for the organisation said in an interview that Turkey "must apologise" about the Ottoman massacres and the fate that was reserved for the Armenians, the Kurds, and the Alevis.

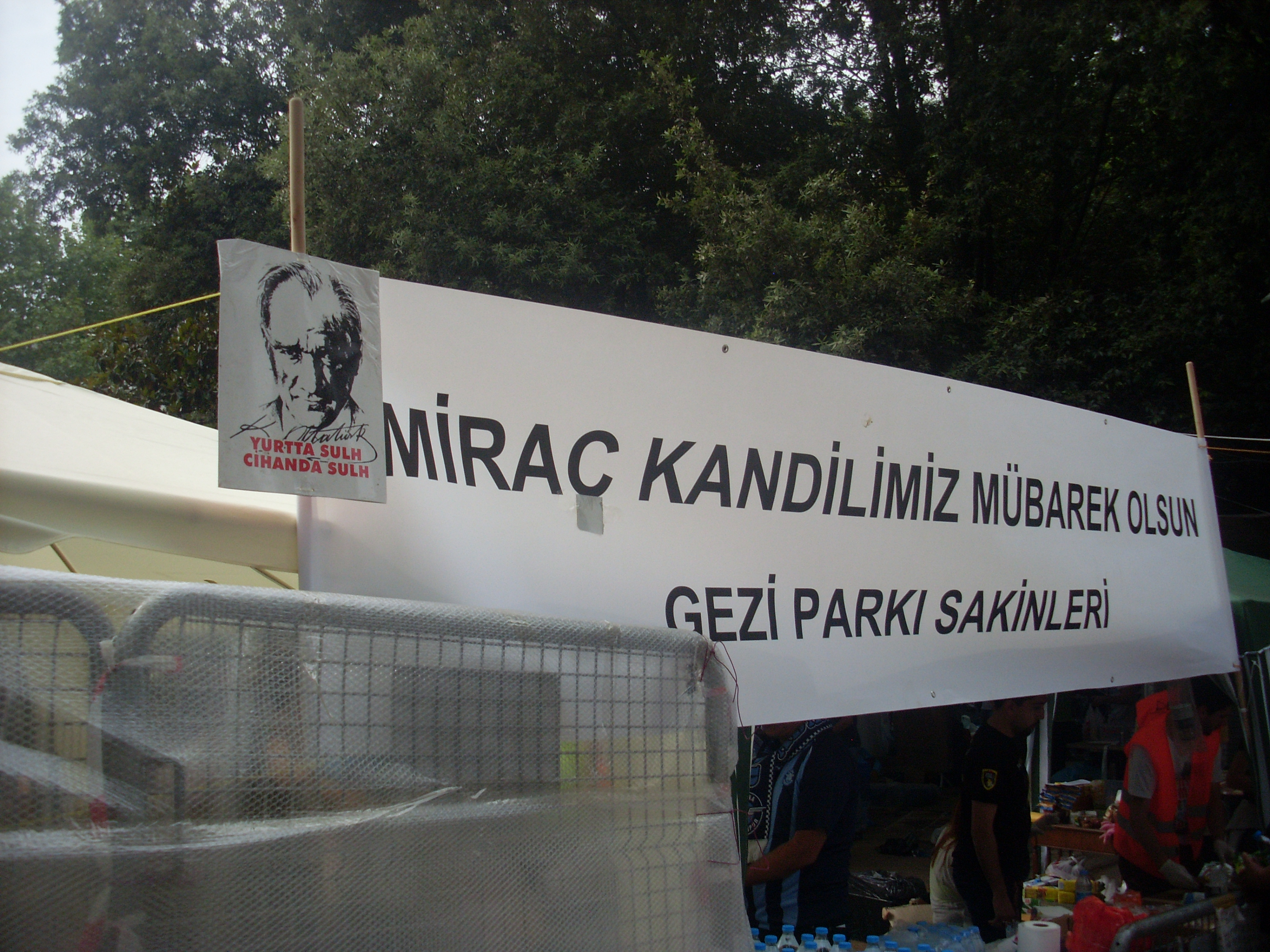
Banner celebrating Mi'raj set up by Anticapitalist Muslims

The association initially gained fame in July 2013 for their involvement in the Gezi Park protests. During the protests, the organisation set up public picnics in green spaces to celebrate iftar. Members of several opposition political parties participated and showed their support for the action. Muslims from various parts of Turkey and the Turkish diaspora supported the movement, and collective prayers (salah) were held in the area, while they prayed, allied groups stood guard protecting them against the police and took turns in prayer.

Following the January 2015 Île-de-France attacks, the organisation issued a condemnation on Twitter, stating: "Obviously, insulting a belief or a value can not justify a massacre... We do not accept these murders, as much as we do not accept the insults done to our prophet..." In 2016, they held a prayer event for workers who have lost their lives.

== Slogans ==
The organisation has various slogans, some of which are:

- Allah, ekmek, özgürlük ("God, bread, freedom")
- Tüm mülk Allah’ındır ("All property belongs to God alone")
- Onlar bir zorbalıkla karşılaştıklarında, yek vucûd olup yardımlaşırlar. ("Those who enforce justice by defending themselves when wronged") (Quran 42:39)
- Biz ezilenleri yeryüzünde iktidar kılmak istiyoruz. ("We wanted to help those who were oppressed on earth, and to turn them into leaders, and make them the inheritors") (Quran 28:5)

== See also ==
- Islamic socialism
