= Committee for the Defense of Prisoners' Rights =

Committee for the Defense of Prisoners' Rights, also translated as Defending the Rights of Prisoners, is an Iranian NGO dedicated to defending the rights of prisoners in the Islamic Republic of Iran. It was founded by human rights activist Emadeddin Baghi after he was sentenced to prison in 1999 when the Iranian judiciary closed the Khordad newspaper where he worked. According to the Financial Times, the committee has two waged staff, and "survives on membership fees from 65 people, donations and a decision by Grand Ayatollah Hossein Ali Montazeri, (a cleric once designated as successor to Grand Ayatollah Ruhollah Khomeini as supreme leader), that it could accept religious dues."

== Sources ==
- Smyth, Gareth (2007-04-27). "Lone challenger to Iran's orthodoxy on the death penalty – FT.com". FT. Archived from the original on 2015-05-07.

== See also ==
- Defenders of Human Rights Center
- Human rights in Islamic Republic of Iran
