= Hossein Shah-Hosseini =

Iranian politician (1928–2017)

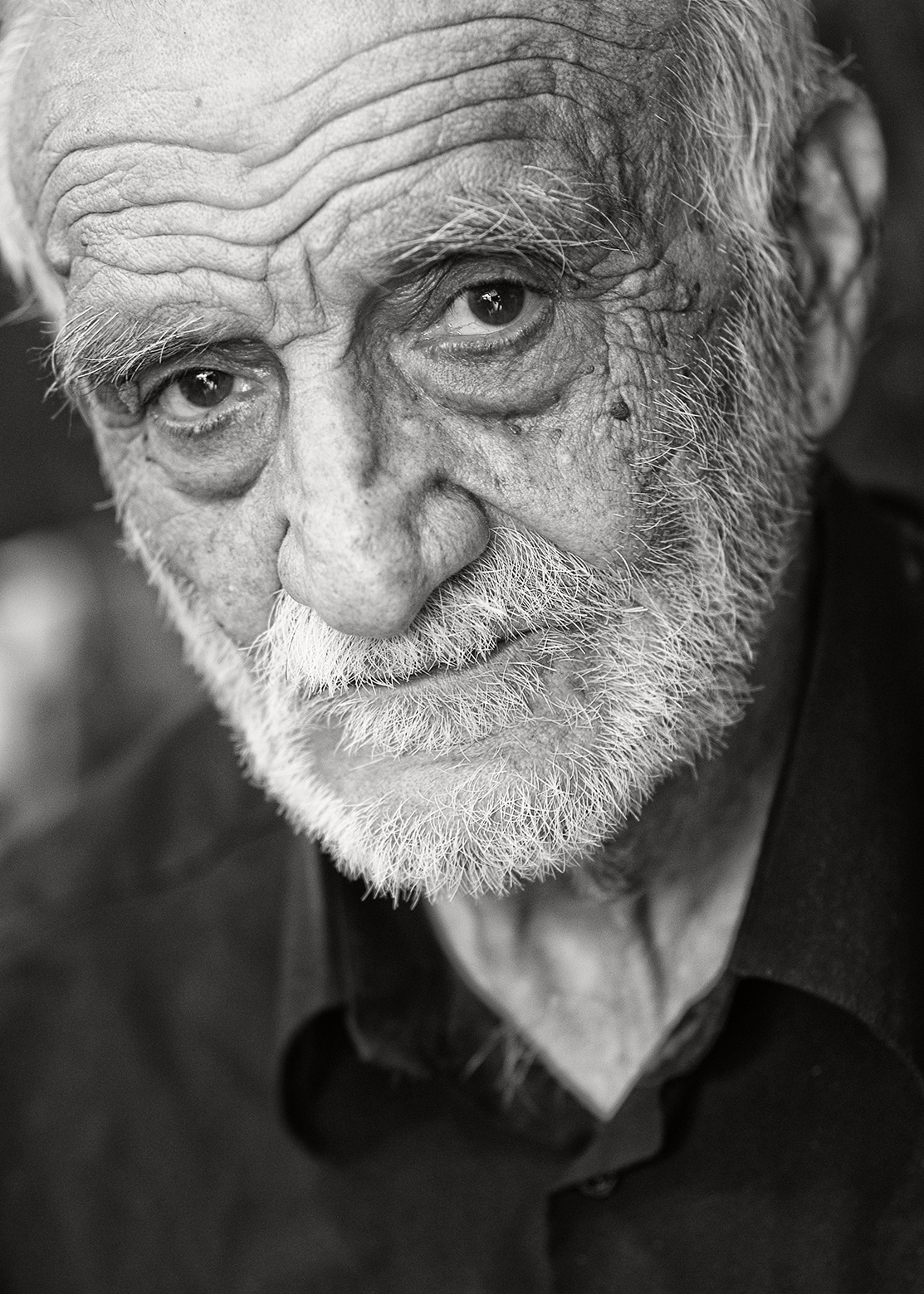
- Shah-Hosseini in 2009

Deputy Prime Minister of Iran Head of Physical Education Organization
- In office February 1979 – August 1980
- Prime Minister: Mehdi Bazargan
- Preceded by: Hossein Fekri
- Succeeded by: Mostafa Davoudi

Personal details
- Born: 21 February 1928 Tehran, Imperial State of Iran
- Died: 24 December 2017 (aged 89) Tehran, Iran
- Party: National Front
- Other political affiliations: Council of Nationalist-Religious Activists of Iran

Hossein Shah-Hosseini (Persian: حسین شاه‌حسینی; 21 February 1928 – 24 December 2017) was an Iranian politician who served as the head of the Physical Education Organization, as well as the National Olympic Committee during the interim cabinet of Mehdi Bazargan.

A leading member of the National Front, he belonged to its Islamic-oriented faction and was closely associated with the Council of Nationalist-Religious Activists of Iran. Shah-Hosseini also served as the treasurer of National Council for Peace.

Government offices
Preceded by Hossein Fekri	Head of Physical Education Organization; 1979–1980	Succeeded by Mostafa Davoudi
Sporting positions
Preceded by Gholamreza Pahlavi	President of National Olympic Committee of Iran; 1979–1980	Succeeded by Mostafa Davoudi
