= Ahmad Zeidabadi =

Iranian journalist

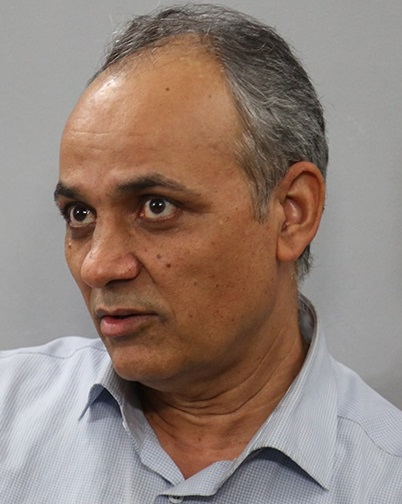
- Born: 31 August 1965 (age 60); Zeidabad, Sirjan, Iran
- Notable credit: Editor-in-chief of Azad News
- Movement: Neo-Shariatism
- Spouse: Mahdieh Mohammadi
- Children: 3
- Awards: UNESCO/Guillermo Cano World Press Freedom Prize (2011)

Ahmad Zeidabadi (Persian: احمد زیدابادی; born 21 July 1965) is an Iranian journalist, academic, writer and political analyst and the secretary general of Office for Strengthening Unity. He is one of the notable figures of the Iranian reform movement.

Zeidabadi has been arrested multiple times for his journalistic work. In June 2009, shortly after the Iranian presidential election, Zeidabadi was arrested and held in conditions which the World Association of Newspapers called "horrific." In December 2009, Zeidabadi was sentenced to six years in prison.

Zeidabadi is the winner of the World Association of Newspapers' Golden Pen of Freedom Award for 2010.

== Background ==
Zeidabadi holds a doctorate degree in international relations from Tehran University. His PhD thesis topic was "Religion and Government in Israel". His articles appeared in many newspapers and other media such as Rooz and BBC Persian.

Zeidabadi's professional work as a journalist started when he joined Ettela'at newspaper in 1989. He also worked with Hamshahri newspaper as well as other reformist newspapers which started being published after Iran's election in 1997. He is the secretary general of Office for Strengthening Unity and is one of the notable figures in Iranian reform movement. He is a member of the board of Iran's Journalists' Union.

He has always defended ethnic and religious minority rights in his articles and speeches. He also is an expert on Arab-Israeli conflict and has published articles supporting the peace process. His courage and integrity has been admired over the years even by his colleagues who did not share the same political views.

In addition to his journalism, Zeidabadi serves on the board of directors of the Society [LA1] of Iranian Journalists and was a member of Advar-e Tahkim Vahdat's policy committee (ATV). He went on to become president of ATV, which is the alumni association of Daftar-e Tahkim Vahdat, the Office for Strengthening Unity, one of Iran's most prominent student organizations and a major pro-democracy force.

== Imprisonment ==
Zeidabadi, ideologically affiliated with Iran's Melli-Mazhabi (Nationalist-Religious) movement, first became a target of the judiciary when the government cracked down on that and other political movements affiliated with reformist ex-President Mohammad Khatami in 2000. He was subjected to the first of many violations of his right to free expression in the year 2000. He was arrested for 'failure to respond to a court summons' and sentenced to seven months in Evin prison in Tehran, including two months in solitary confinement. He was detained again less than two weeks after his release, this time on allegations of 'conspiring against the government.' Soon after, Speaker of Parliament Mehdi Karroubi intervened on his behalf, and he was released.

He was tried again in early 2002 and sentenced to 23 months in prison, which was eventually reduced to 13 months. For the next five years, he was barred from "any public and social activity, including journalism". Zeidabadi, on the other hand, was unfazed, and he went on to provide political commentary on Iran and the region to a number of reformist sources, both online and offline.

In June 2009, right after the Iranian presidential election, security forces arrested Zeidabadi and took him to prison. The living conditions Zeidabadi endured while in prison prompted him to partake in a hunger strike that was broken by force by security forces. Amnesty International described the conditions of his imprisonment as follows:

Ahmad Zeidabadi, a journalist for Roozonline, an online publication based in Belgium and spokesperson for the Graduates’ Association, was arrested on 21 June. He was held incommunicado until his appearance on 8 August at the second session of the “show trial” (see Chapter 7). His wife was only allowed to visit him in Evin Prison for the first time on 17 August and said that he was in an extremely bad physical and emotional state. She said that Ahmad Zeidabadi told her that he had been held in solitary confinement for 35 days after his arrest in a coffin-like cell only 1.5m long. He had apparently gone on hunger strike for 17 days until doctors convinced him to stop. His wife met him again in mid-September, when he told her that he had been severely beaten during interrogation. In an interview with Radio Farda on 23 September, she said his interrogator told him: “We are ordered to crush you, and if you do not cooperate we can do anything we want with you and if you do not write the interrogation papers, we will force you to eat them.”

In December 2009, the Iranian Judiciary sentenced Zeidabadi to 6 years in prison, 5 years in exile in Gonabad, and lifetime ban on social and political activities in an in camera court. He is charged with sedition and propaganda against Iran's regime.

== Honors and awards ==
- On 17 December 2009, Zeidabadi won World Association of Newspapers' Golden Pen of Freedom Award for 2010.

In the award citation, the World Association of Newspapers said:

"All journalists are aware of the dangers of challenging the autocratic regime of President Mahmoud Ahmadinejad and the actions of Iran's Supreme Leader, Ali Khamenei. Mr Zeid-Abadi has chosen to repeatedly brave them and publicly support reform and the rule of law in Iran. He was sentenced to six years in prison, five years in internal exile in the town of Gonabad and a lifetime writing ban in the wake of the disputed presidential election in June. Mr Zeid-Abadi has refused to give in, despite the horrific conditions in which he is being held, and his courage makes us feel very humble. We hope Mr Zeid-Abadi's sentence will be overturned."

- He also won the UNESCO/Guillermo Cano World Press Freedom Prize in 2011.

"The final choice of Ahmad Zeidabadi pays a tribute to his exceptional courage, resistance, and commitment to freedom of expression, democracy, human rights, tolerance, and humanity," according to UNESCO. An independent international jury of 12 media professionals selected Zeidabadi, according to UNESCO. In addition to him, the Prize will be given to the numerous Iranian journalists who are now imprisoned."

- The International Press Institute honored Iranian journalist Ahmad Zeidabadi and the independent Turkish news outlet Medyascope.tv as its 68th World Press Freedom Hero and 2016 Free Media Pioneer, respectively, on the opening day of the IPI World Congress in Doha, Qatar.

== Personal ==
He takes an anti-government position. He supported reformist candidate Mehdi Karroubi in the disputed 2009 presidential election.

== Other Works/Publications ==
- Zeidabadi, Ahmad (2018). Bahare Zendegi Dar Zemestane Tehran. p. 272. ISBN 978-9-641-85570-5.
- Zeidabadi, Ahmad. Elzamate Siasat Dar Asre Mellat-Dolat. ISBN 978-9-641-85580-4.

== See also ==
- Human rights in Iran
