= Taghi Rahmani =

Iranian journalist (born 1959)

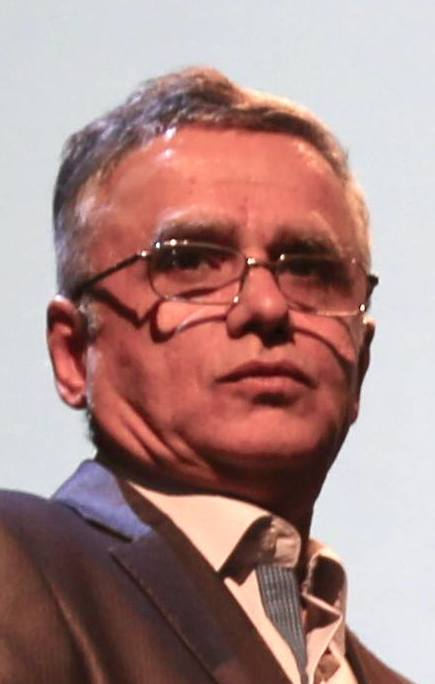
- Rahmani in 2016
- Born: 1959 (age 66–67); Takestan, Iran
- Occupations: Journalist, writer, activist
- Political party: Council of Nationalist-Religious Activists of Iran
- Movement: Neo-Shariatism
- Spouse: Narges Mohammadi (m. 2001)
- Children: 2
- Awards: HRW Hellman/Hammett Grant (2005)

Taghi Rahmani (Persian: تقی رحمانی; born 1959) is an Iranian journalist, writer and nationalist-religious activist.

Shireen Hunter describes Rahmani as "a contemporary Iranian intellectual and author of books on religious intellectualism and reason".

Between 1981 and 2005, he reportedly was sentenced to a total of 5,000 days in prison. According to Reporters Without Borders, he is "Iran’s most frequently jailed journalist" and Amnesty International has designated him a prisoner of conscience.

Rahmani was a senior campaign official for Mehdi Karroubi during 2009 Iranian presidential election.

Rahmani is married to political activist Narges Mohammadi, the 2023 Nobel Peace Prize recipient.
