= İhsan Eliaçık =

Turkish author (born 1961)

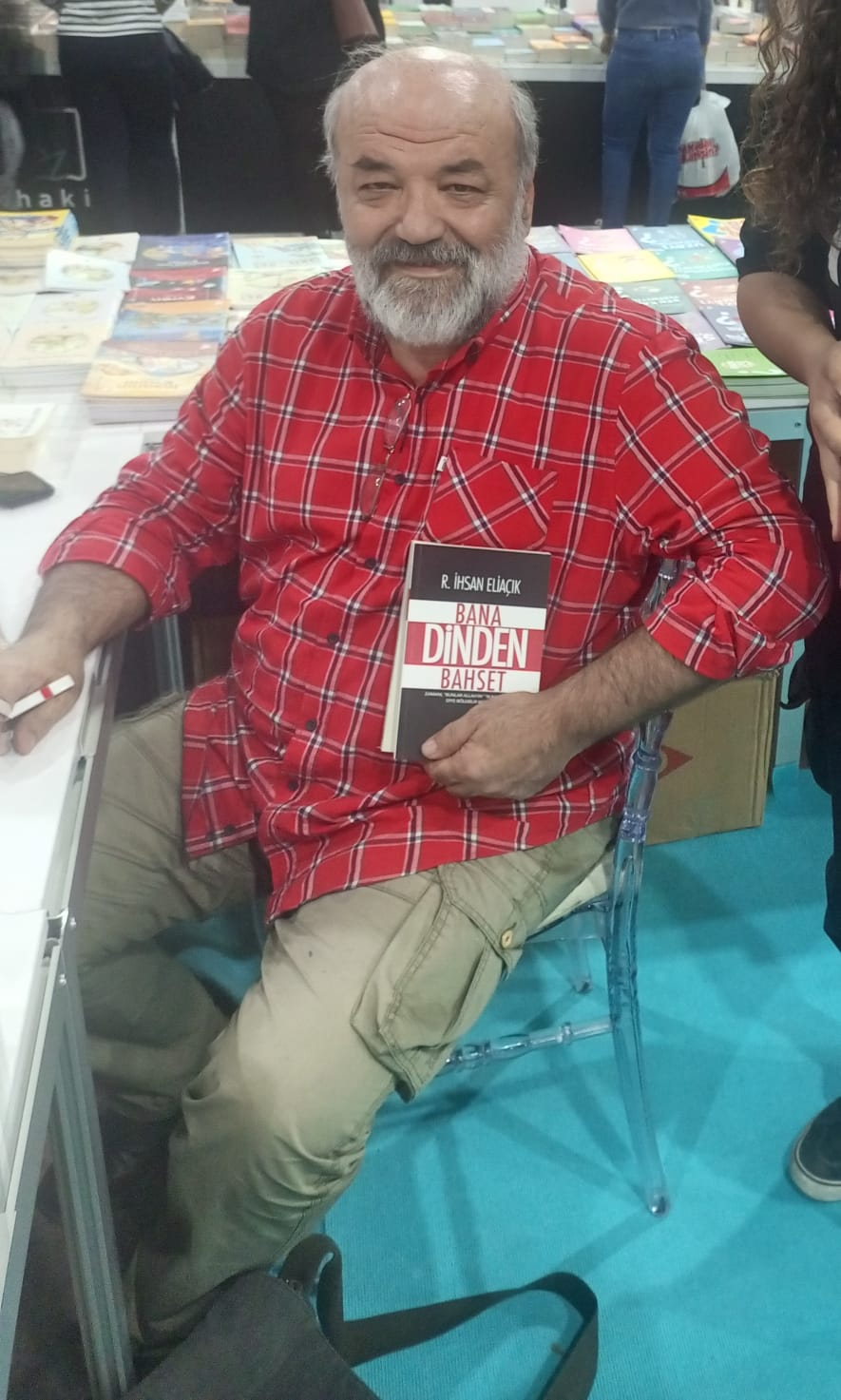

Personal life
- Born: Recep İhsan Eliaçık; 23 December 1961 (age 64) Yeşilhisar, Kayseri, Turkey
- Main interest(s): Tafsir, Islamic economics, Political aspects of Islam
- Notable work: Anti-Capitalist Muslims
- Education: Erciyes University

Religious life
- Religion: Islam
- Denomination: Quranism

Recep İhsan Eliaçık (born December 23, 1961) is a Turkish Islamic theologian and writer. He is the founder of the Turkish Islamic socialist organisation Anti-Capitalist Muslims. He has written over 20 books, including a Turkish translation of the Quran.

== Biography ==
Eliaçık completed his primary, secondary and high school education in different schools in Kayseri and Kırşehir. He studied at Erciyes University Faculty of Theology between 1985 and 1990. He is married and has five children. He speaks Arabic and lives in Istanbul. He is known as the "taboo breaker".

During the Gezi Park protests, he used expressions such as "dictator, harasser, provocateur, insolent, liar" for Recep Tayyip Erdoğan on Twitter, and Recep Tayyip Erdoğan filed a lawsuit for compensation of 50,000 TL against him.

== Views ==
Eliaçık believes that it is mandatory per Quranic verse 4:136 for all Muslims to donate everything they do not use. He stated in an interview that he believes the Islamic duty is not just caring for the poor, but overthrowing the "capitalist devilish system" that makes them poor, "just like the Islamic prophets overthrew the devilish systems of their times".

He claimed that many use Islam to advance their interests, and countries such as Saudi Arabia, Pakistan and Afghanistan all interpret Islam with an "extreme understanding". When asked about secularism, he stated that "classical secularism" excludes the holy book, and an alternative way can be found.

He advocates for a "borderless world of peace". On evolution, he commented that it is a matter for science to discuss, not religion, and that Islam will never be proven wrong anyways. On polygamy, he stated that the verses about polygamy are widely misunderstood and that Islam is strictly against the practice.
