= Defenders of Human Rights Center =

Iranian human rights organization

The Defenders of Human Rights Center (Persian: کانون مدافعان حقوق بشر) is an Iranian human rights organization.

== Organization ==
Based in Tehran, the organization was founded in 2001 and has been active in defending rights of women, political prisoners and minorities in Iran. Several of the most prominent Iranian lawyers founded the organization and are members. Shirin Ebadi, 2003 Nobel Peace Prize laureate, is the president of DHRC as of 2012. Ebadi along with four other notable Iranian lawyers, Abdolfattah Soltani, Mohammad Seifzadeh, Mohammad Ali Dadkhah and Mohammad Sharif, Mehdi Afsharzadeh were the founding members of the organization. Narges Mohammadi joined the organization in 2003 and went on to become its vice president as of 2012.

The center is a member of the International Federation for Human Rights and received the 2003 Human Rights Award of the French National Commission of Human Rights.

No permit is required for organizations like DHRC to operate in Iran, but it may be advantageous to have one. During neither the presidency of Mohammad Khatami, nor that of Mahmoud Ahmadinejad, has the DHRC succeeded in obtaining official registration. DHRC requested a permit in February 2004. According to Ebadi, in September 2006, the Political Deputy of the Ministry of the Interior announced that the commission had approved the request, but the Ministry of the Interior never issued a permit.

== Accomplishments ==
DHRC helped defend many legal cases such as "the chain murders of Iranian intellectuals" and those of Iranian bloggers, as well as defending Akbar Ganji and family of Zahra Kazemi among many others.

== Relationships with government ==
=== Closure of office ===
The DHRC had planned to hold on 21 December 2008 a ceremony in honor of the sixtieth anniversary of the Universal Declaration of Human Rights. On that day, security officials shut down the DHRC offices, without presenting a court order allowing them to do so.

According to Shirin Ebadi, on 22 and 29 December 2008 the DHRC offices were searched and much property was illegally seized, some of which has not been returned. On 1 January 2009, a mob of basiji attacked and vandalized the building while police looked on.

There was widespread condemnation of these actions. U.N. Secretary-General Ban Ki-moon issued a statement of concern. The European Union called on Iran "to respect their international human rights commitments and the right to peaceful assembly."

=== Threats ===
Office staff have been threatened and forced to resign. Several members of DHRC, the committee to Defend Free, Healthy and Fair Elections and the National Council of Peace have been summoned for interrogation and 'encouraged' to end their cooperation with those organizations and efforts. Some have also been illegally barred from travel outside Iran.

Security officials have threatened people scheduled to attend DHRC meetings, which were obstructed and prevented from taking place. Police came to disperse those present.

=== Baháʼí Faith ===
The official governmental news agency, the Islamic Republic of Iran News Agency (IRNA), accused Shirin Ebadi and her daughter of being followers of the Baháʼí Faith, which is not a recognized religion in Iran. Ebadi has denied this claim, although the secretary of the DHRC, Zhinous Sobhani, is a Baháʼí. Sobhani was arrested on 14 January 2009 and held in Tehran's Evin Prison for 55 days before being released on 70 million toman [about $70,000 US] bail. Abdolfattah Soltani, a DHRC lawyer, told the BBC: "In all probability, the reason for her arrest was her work with the DHRC, and also because she is a Baháʼí, although neither of these is a crime, and no other charge [against her] has yet been announced." Jinous Sobhani was also secretary for the Mine-Clearing Collaboration (MCCC) Campaign and worked for the Organization for Defending Mine Victims. She was arrested again following the 2009 Ashura protests and in September 2010 was sentenced to two years in prison.

IRNA accused the Deputy Chair of DHRC of "spreading propaganda against the state", although no official such charge has ever been made.

=== Other arrests ===
Abdolfattah Soltani was himself detained in June 2009.

Mohammad Ali Dadkhah of DHRC was reportedly arrested, along with a number of others, in Tehran on 8 July 2009. He is said to have provided legal representation for some of the hundreds of people arrested following the June election.

== Honours and awards ==
- 2003 Human Rights Award from the French National Commission of Human Rights.
- 2003 Nobel Peace Prize, for Shirin Ebadi, the president of DHRC as of 2012.
- 2023 Nobel Peace Prize, for Narges Mohammadi, the vice president of DHRC as of 2012.

== See also ==
- Human rights activists
- Human rights in the Islamic Republic of Iran
- Islamic Human Rights Commission
