= Abdolfattah Soltani =

Iranian human rights defender

- عبدالفتاح سلطانی
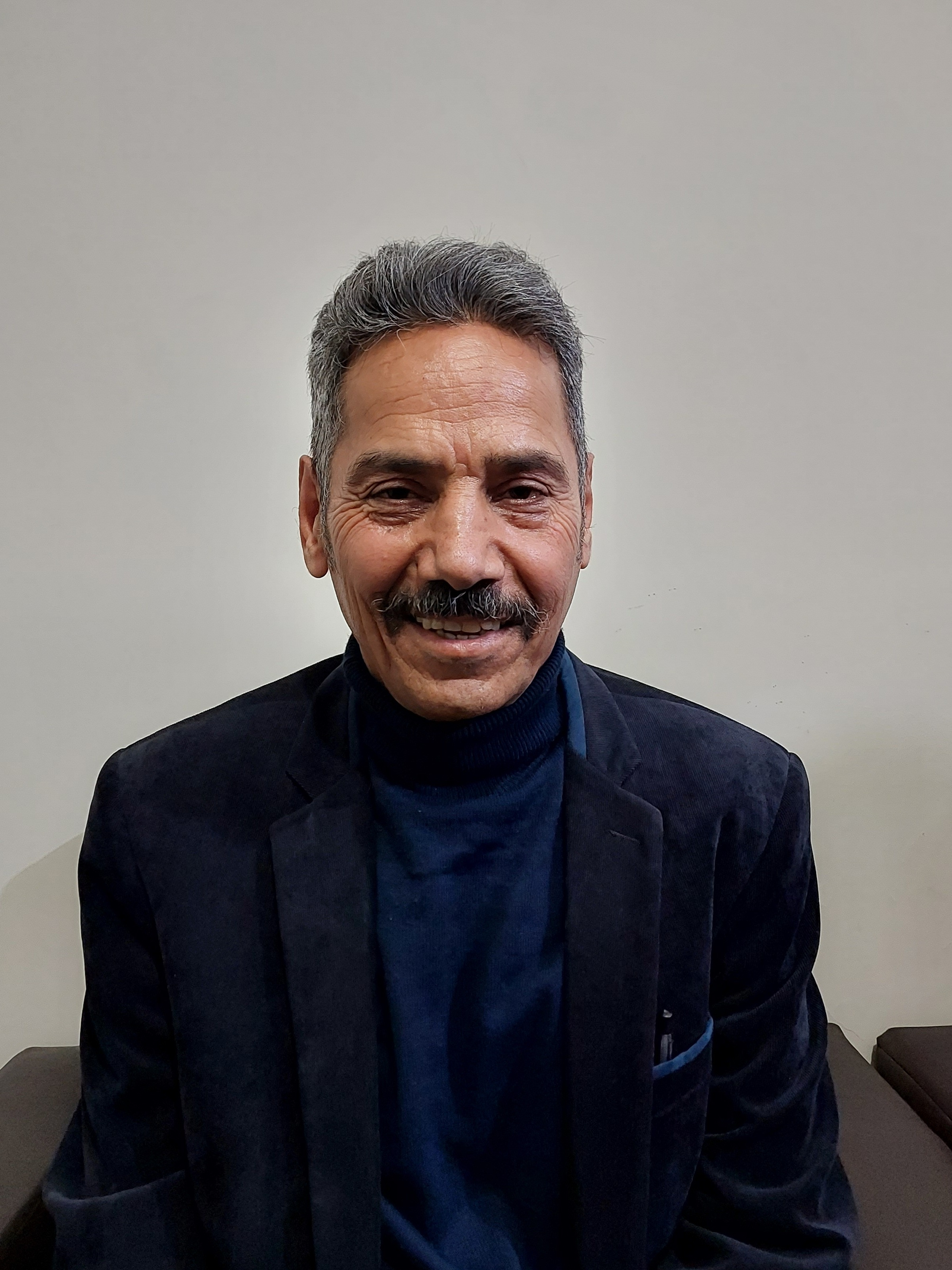
- Born: 2 November 1953 (age 72)
- Occupation: lawyer
- Organization: Defenders of Human Rights Center
- Known for: Human rights cases; 2005, 2009, and 2012 arrests
- Spouse: Masoumeh Dehghan
- Children: 4
- Awards: Nuremberg International Human Rights Award (2009); International Bar Association Human Rights Award (2012)

Abdolfattah Soltani (Persian: عبدالفتاح سلطانی; born 2 November 1953) is an Iranian human rights lawyer and spokesman for the Defenders of Human Rights Center. He co-founded the group with Mohammad Seifzadeh and Nobel Peace Prize-winner Shirin Ebadi. Along with Ebadi, Soltani served as a lawyer for the family of slain Iranian-Canadian photojournalist Zahra Kazemi, who was allegedly tortured and murdered in Evin Prison in July 2003. Ebadi and Soltani, along with others, also represented jailed journalist Akbar Ganji during his imprisonment and long hunger strike. Soltani, who won the Nuremberg International Human Rights Award, in 2009, served time in prison in 2005 and 2009, and was sentenced to 18-year prison sentence in 2012.

== Life ==
Soltani was incarcerated for political offences in 2005 and 2009. He received an 18-year prison sentence in 2012 and was banned for an additional 20 years from practicing law. Amnesty International designated him a prisoner of conscience and called him "one of the bravest human rights defenders in Iran".

== Legal work ==
Soltani is a co-founder of the Defenders of Human Rights Center, an Iranian human rights organization, along with Mohammad Seifzadeh and future Nobel Peace Prize-winner Shirin Ebadi. Along with Ebadi and Seifzadeh, Soltani served as a lawyer for the family of slain Iranian-Canadian photojournalist Zahra Kazemi, who was allegedly tortured and murdered in Evin Prison in July 2003. Soltani, along with Seifzadeh, Ebadi and others, also represented jailed journalist Akbar Ganji during his imprisonment and long hunger strike and imprisoned Iranian-American academic Haleh Esfandiari.

== 2005 imprisonment ==
On 25 July 2005, Soltani criticized the fairness of the trial brought by Kazemi's family. Two days later, a Tehran prosecutor issued a warrant to search Soltani's home and office. The prosecutor then charged him with espionage. On 30 July, while participating in a sit-in to protest the charge, Soltani was arrested. He was detained incommunicado at Evin prison, including two months in Section 209, which is reserved for political prisoners. On 6 March 2006, he was released on bail of 100,000 euros.

On 16 July 2006, he was informed that the Revolutionary Court had sentenced him to five years' imprisonment and the loss of his civic rights for "non-respect of the confidentiality of the preliminary enquiry" in the Kazemi case. He appealed the decision and was acquitted on 28 May 2007 of all charges pending against him since July 2005. However, his identity papers were confiscated, preventing him from traveling.

== 2009 imprisonment ==
On 16 June, four days after the 2009 June election, Abdolfattah Soltani was arrested, his computers seized, and he was again taken to Evin prison. There was no arrest warrant, and no reasons for the arrest were stated. He was held there for 72 days, 17 of which were in solitary confinement and was not allowed to shower for the first 15 days. He lost 15 pounds while in prison.

According to Soltani, he was approached by a judge named Majid Matin Rasekh about a day after he was locked up and accused of "being skeptical about the results of the election.“ The judge then issued an order to detain him on "a temporary basis". While in prison he listened to young recently arrested inmates being interrogated and pleading innocent and was himself "explicitly" told, "'If you recant, disconnect yourself from Shirin Ebadi's human rights center ... then you will be freed right now.'" Soltani refused, and also later refused a one-week humanitarian leave to attend the mourning ceremony of his sister who died in a car crash while he was in prison because it required him to not speak out to the media about his incarceration. When his brother-in-law died two weeks later as a result of injuries from the same crash, he again refused a one-week leave that required him to keep quiet. He later stated: "Accepting their condition was a rubber stamp on my non-committed crime."

Soltani stated that he suspected the motivation for arresting him was anger of the authorities "for continuing to meet with other human-rights lawyers even after" his "small office of the human-rights center" was shut down "for operating without a permit."

That year, he won the Nuremberg International Human Rights Award.

== 2011 imprisonment ==
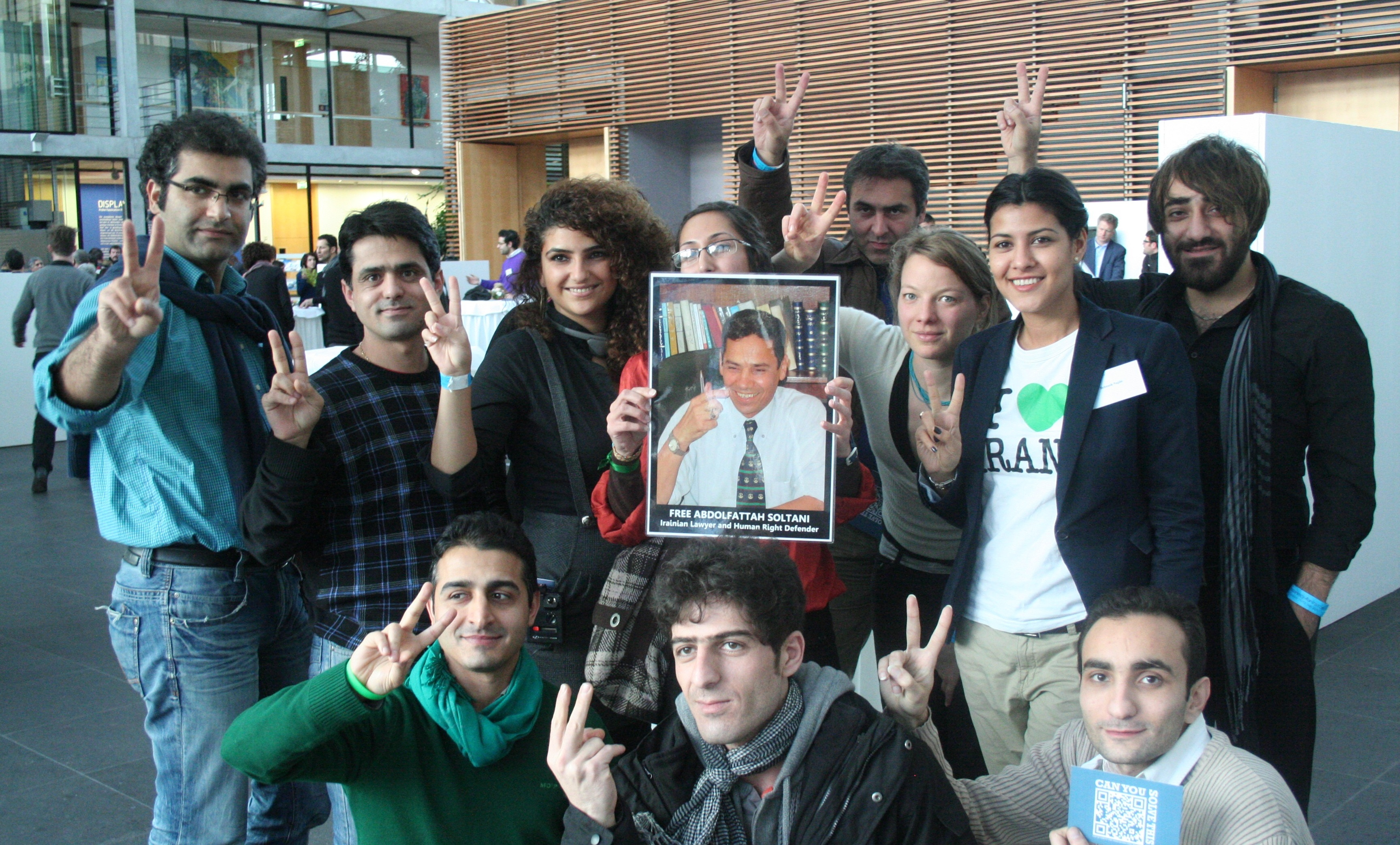
Maede Soltani asks for the freedom of her father, Abdolfattah Soltani, November 2011

Soltani was arrested again 10 September 2011 while preparing to defend a group of Baháʼí defendants. He received an 18-year prison sentence in 2012 and was banned for an additional 20 years from practicing law. His daughter stated the sentence was for "co-founding the Center for Human Rights Defenders, spreading anti-government propaganda, endangering national security and accepting an illegal prize [the Nuremberg International Human Rights Award]". Amnesty International designated him a prisoner of conscience, "held solely for the peaceful exercise of his right to freedom of expression and association, including his work as a defence lawyer and in the Centre".

In October 2012, Soltani was awarded the International Bar Association's Human Rights Award. Because Soltani was imprisoned, his daughter Maede Soltani received it on his behalf.

== Awards ==
- 2019, Council of Bars and Law Societies of Europe (CCBE) Human Rights Award
