= Mohammad Seifzadeh =

Iranian lawyer and human rights activist (born 1948)

سید محمد سیف زاده Mohammad Seifzadeh
- Born: 1948 (age 77–78); Qom, Iran
- Occupations: lawyer, Founder of Defenders of Human Rights Center

Mohammad Seifzadeh (Persian: سید محمد سیف زاده - born 1948) is an Iranian lawyer, a former judge, human rights activist and a cofounder of Centre for the Defence of Human Rights in Iran. He is the older brother of Hossein Seifzadeh, an Iranian political scientist.

== Life ==
Seifzadeh was a member of Nobel Peace Prize laureate Shirin Ebadi's legal team in 2004 when she represented the mother of Canadian photojournalist Zahra Kazemi, who had been murdered in an Iranian prison, allegedly by an Iranian security officer.

In October 2010, Seifzadeh was charged with "collusion and assembly with intent to disrupt internal security," "propagation activities against the regime," and "establishing the Center for Human Rights Defenders." He was sentenced to 9 years of prison and 10 years of ban from the practice of law. He called the ruling the result of "an unlawful court proceeding".

While appealing the ruling, Seifzahed remained at liberty. In April 2011, he visited Urumiyeh on the Turkish border and was arrested by Iranian officials on charges of attempting to leave the country illegally. Seifzahed's lawyer argued that he had only been in the city for a research project.

Since then, various organizations such as the International Federation for Human Rights (FIDH) and Reporters Without Borders (RSF) have called for his release. Amnesty International designated him a prisoner of conscience.

== See also ==
- Human rights in the Islamic Republic of Iran
- Intellectual movements in Iran
