= Hatam Ghaderi =

Iranian sociologist (born 1956)

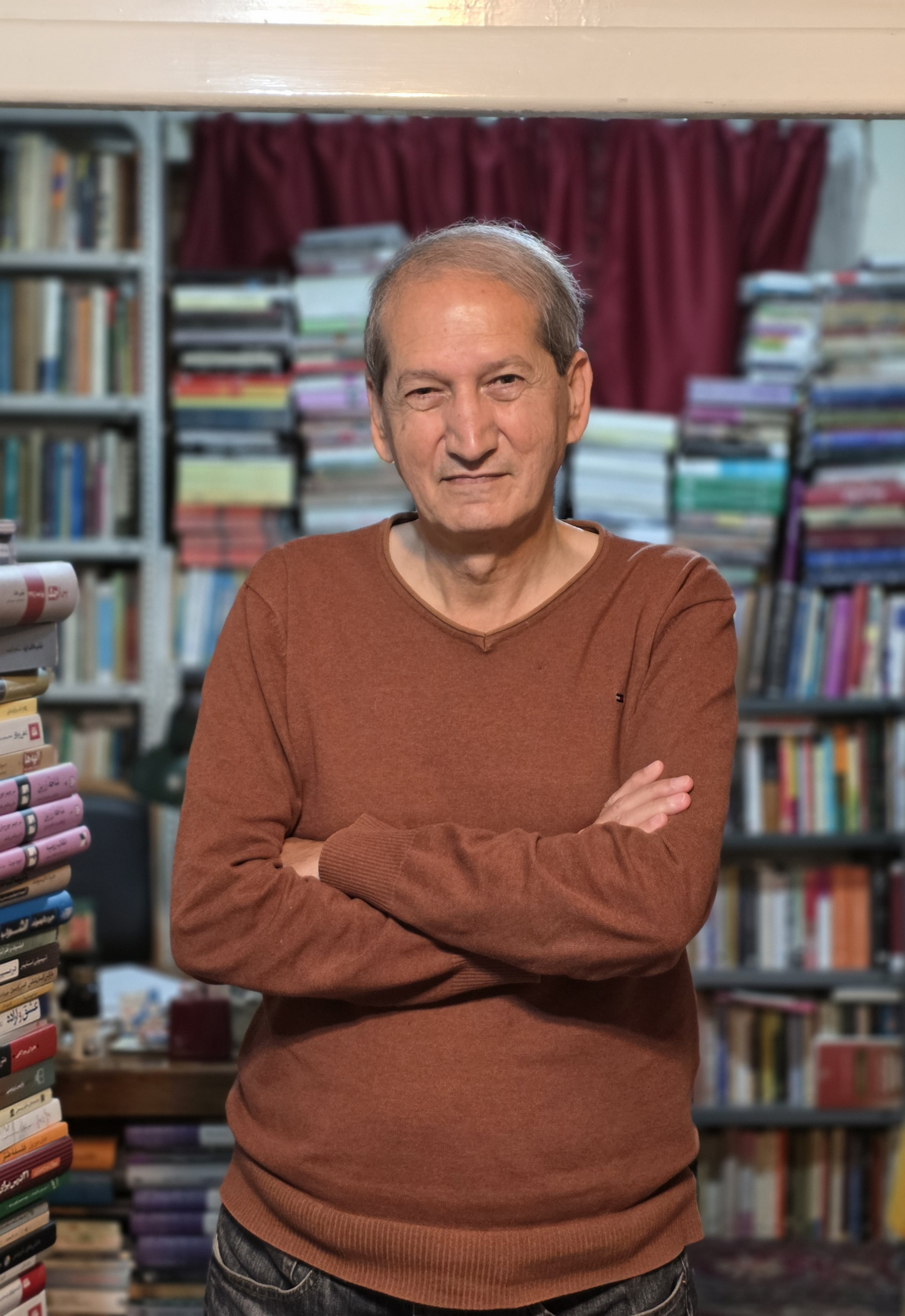
- Born: 1956 (age 69–70); Tehran, Iran
- Known for: Criticism against the Islamic Republic

Hatem Ghaderi (born 1956; Persian: حاتم قادری) is an Iranian researcher and professor of political science. He is a retired member of the faculty at Tarbiat Modares University and also teaches at the Rokhdad Tazeh Institute. Ghaderi is often recognized for his works in the field of political thought and his interviews on contemporary political topics. Many of his works are considered important resources in the fields of political thought and the history of thought in the Persian language.

== Youth and education ==
Hatem Ghaderi was born in 1956 in Tehran. He pursued his education in the field of political science and continued his work as a researcher and university professor.

== Political activity ==
Ghaderi has contributed to the establishment and development of political thought in Iran and has played a significant role in education and research in this area.

Ghaderi is recognized as a political analyst known for his political interviews and as a consistent opponent of participating in elections in Iran since the 1980s. He is famous for his presence in electoral debates. In some instances, he has delivered speeches and taught political thought for reformist political parties. He has also been a critic of reformists.

Critics consider Ghaderi to be part of the radical forces with a background in socialist leftist ideology from the 1980s, who would stand at university entrances and punish young students for not conforming to their thoughts and appearance.

In response to various protests after the revolution, including the 2022 Iran protests, Ghaderi has criticized the policies of the Islamic Republic in various interviews. One of these was an audio interview with the BBC during the 2022 Iran protests, which received widespread public attention.

On 28 January 2026, Ghaderi, along with several other Iranian intellectuals and the Narges Mohammadi Human Rights Foundation, published a statement on Instagram asserting that the 2026 Iran massacres were a crime against humanity, accusing Supreme Leader of Iran Ali Khamenei of holding principal responsibility.

== Views ==
=== Iran and the Transition to Democracy through Modernity ===
He considers modernity, understood as the configuration of European civilization that has led to various political-social systems, to be the ultimate goal of social transformation, allowing diverse groups to draw from its different emerging models. According to Ghaderi, the mistake and deviation in the process that has taken place in Iran since the Constitutional Revolution has been to embrace the superficial aspects of work and modernization without fully drawing inspiration from modernity itself and defining it as a roadmap.

Therefore, he does not find desirable the actions, changes, and mechanisms within Iranian society that lead to the reproduction of the Iranian subject and the modern realm with its own cultural and religious characteristics, especially if they obstruct the ultimate transition to modernity. He believes that since political radicalism since the 1960s has caused inadequacies and errors in the approach, a barrier should be drawn in various matters so that anything related to these issues does not produce Iranian thought and is limited, entrusting the definition of the modern Iranian subject to the philosophical framework of non-ideological systems emerging from modernity.

On the other hand, he argues that since the Iranian tradition has failed to reproduce itself and represent new elements, he proposes a theory for social transition, asserting that the path to democracy in Iran, which is unfolding, involves the transformation of the traditional subject for a transition to modernity. This transformation is not abrupt but occurs gradually, manifested as a spectrum of individuals transitioning as a result of the revolution in communications and the internet, as well as the connection of Iranians with the Western world. He posits that the gradual transformation of traditionalists and the emergence from the intertwining of two paradigms toward modernity in the social sphere will take at least two generations (since 2014).

He believes that the current regime in Iran is the last ideological system that can exist in the country, and that the political-social systems of modernity and the subjects within them are not constructed from a single ideology or behaviors derived from it.

=== Democracy and Its Relationship with Islam and Shia Religion ===
Hatem Ghaderi, in various articles and interviews, points out the inconsistency between Shia political thought and the type of democracy he envisions, highlighting two main issues. The first relates to the Shia belief in divine light and illumination, based on a narration from Ali ibn Abi Talib, the first Imam of Shia Islam. According to Ghaderi, this belief conflicts with the principles of democracy and the rights of Shia Muslims and other Muslims in relation to non-believers or adherents of other religions and sects, which may undermine the concept of equality of rights (civil rights) in a democratic context.

The second issue concerns leadership. Ghaderi argues that the principle of Imamate, as a cornerstone of Shia political thought, may inherently introduce a form of authoritarianism that does not align with democratic principles. Similarly, he views Islam as possessing characteristics that are incompatible with democracy. To address this inadequacy, he proposes the development of a model of religious thought he calls political and social theology, which should be based on a philosophical perspective rather than solely relying on the texts of verses and narrations. For instance, in this political theology, revelation is viewed as a matter of interpretation rather than merely a report.

==== Arbaeen Pilgrimage ====
He believes that the Iranian Islamic regime is fraught with numerous conflicts and even contradictions. One example he cites is when the government calls for an increase in production while simultaneously encouraging people to participate in the Arbaeen pilgrimage. As a result of this pilgrimage, millions of Iranians are taken out of the production cycle and travel to Iraq.

==== Gaza War and the Plight of Palestinians ====
According to Ghaderi, the events that have occurred in Gaza and Palestine are primarily the fault of Iran, Hamas, and Israel, rather than just Israel. He states that despite the solidarity that some factions on the Iranian left still feel for Palestine, after 40 years, Iran has only built missiles and tunnels in Gaza. As a result, he argues, Iran's management of Gaza has not led to a transformation akin to that of Singapore, Hong Kong, or Silicon Valley.
