= Omid Kokabee =

Iranian experimental laser physicist

- Born: 1982 (age 43–44); Gonbad-e Qabus, Iran
- Education: University of Texas at Austin; ICFO – The Institute of Photonic Sciences; Polytechnic University of Catalonia; University of Barcelona; Autonomous University of Barcelona; Sharif University of Technology
- Occupations: Laser Scientist; Postdoctoral researcher; Prisoner of Conscience in Iran
- Awards: Andrei Sakharov Prize (APS) in 2014, American Physical Society; Scientific Freedom and Responsibility Award (AAAS) in 2014 American Association for the Advancement of Science

Omid Kokabee (Persian: امید کوکبی; born 1982) is an Iranian experimental laser physicist at the University of Texas at Austin who was arrested in Iran after returning from the United States to visit his family on January 30, 2011. He was initially charged with "gathering and colluding against national security." Still, later, after being acquitted of the primary charges, he was put on trial for “communicating with a hostile government (USA)” and “illegitimate/illegal earnings”. Even though he repeatedly denied all charges against himself, he was finally sentenced to ten years in prison.

In September 2013, the American Physical Society announced Kokabee as a co-recipient of its 2014 Andrei Sakharov Prize for "his courage in refusing to use his physics knowledge to work on projects that he deemed harmful to humanity in the face of extreme physical and psychological pressure".

In November 2013, Amnesty International released a public statement declaring Kokabee a "prisoner of conscience, held solely for his refusal to work on military projects in Iran and as a result of spurious charges related to his legitimate scholarly ties with academic institutions outside of Iran." In that statement Amnesty asked for "his immediate and unconditional release".

In October 2014, the American Association for the Advancement of Science (AAAS) awarded Kokabee its 2014 Scientific Freedom and Responsibility Award "for his courageous stand and willingness to endure imprisonment rather than violate his moral stance that his scientific expertise not be used for destructive purposes and for his efforts to provide hope and education to fellow prisoners".

While in prison, he translated "Human Rights Atlas" by Andrew Fagan to Persian. The Persian translation was published as a book with the same title by Iranian publisher Armanshahr in April 2015 before Omid's release. It was distributed and made available to the public in Iran. In August 2016 after five years of prison he was released on parole.

== Life and education ==
Kokabee is from Iran's mostly Sunni Muslim Turkmen ethnic group. He was ranked 29th in the Iranian university entrance exam, with more than one million participants annually. He entered Sharif University of Technology in 2000, and completed a double major undergraduate program in Applied Physics and Mechanical Engineering. In 2007, he went to Spain to obtain his master's degree in Photonics at Polytechnic University of Catalonia at the Institute of Photonic Sciences, ICFO, in Barcelona. Omid started his Ph.D. at the University of Texas at Austin in 2010. He has published more than twenty collaborative papers, including seven journal publications, including his publications in Optics Letters.

== Arrest and imprisonment ==
During winter break in 2011, Kokabee traveled to Iran to visit with his family. He was arrested at Imam Khomeini International Airport on his return trip to the United States in February 2011, and was subjected to solitary confinement for 36 days after his arrest. In an open letter, Kokabee claimed that the authorities were trying to obtain his collaboration for the Iranian nuclear program by threatening him and his family.

After 15 months of detention without trial and postponement of two trials in July and October 2011, Kokabee went on trial in Tehran on May 13, 2012. According to his lawyer, Saeed Khalili, Kokabee was charged with having relations with a hostile country and receiving illegitimate funds. Kokabee attended trial before a judge Abolqasem Salavati with a group of 10 to 15 people in the same session, under the collective charge of collaborating with Israeli authorities. While other prisoners declared themselves guilty in a TV broadcast, Kokabee consistently denied all charges and did not speak in court. He was sentenced to 10 years of imprisonment. The sentence was confirmed in an appeal trial on August 19, 2012.

Several physics associations, including the American Physical Society, the International Optics Society SPIE, the Optical Society of America, and the European Optical Society, have lodged protests against his imprisonment. The open letters to Iran's supreme leader, Ayatollah Ali Khamenei, note that Kokabee was not politically active and was not associated with any political movement in Iran. However, he is an expert in laser technology, and as indicated in a Nature news article, this expertise may have led to an attempt to intimidate him to work for the Iranian nuclear program, in the area of laser isotope separation.

Since 2007, several U.S.-Iranian dual nationals or Americans of Iranian ancestry have faced arrest, imprisonment or criminal charges when visiting Iran (examples being Radio Farda correspondent Parnaz Azima, Roxana Saberi, Ali Shakeri, Esha Momeni, Haleh Esfandiari, and Kian Tajbakhsh).

Omid said:

Is it a sin that I don’t want, under any circumstances, to get involved in security and military activities? ... I have just turned 30 years old after spending two years in prison when I am eager to pursue scientific research.

Nature received copies of the letters from Kokabee’s contacts, who asked to remain anonymous because of fear of retribution.

Omid and another inmate, Mehdi Khodaei, translated the book, The Atlas of Human Rights by Andrew Fagan in Persian and made it available to the public on the internet for download in 2015.

On November 24, 2015, Omid was transferred to Taleghani Hospital in Tehran, suffering from kidney stones. He was released on parole on 29 August 2016. This does not amount to a full release since he can still be brought back to prison for the remaining three years of his sentence should the judiciary decide to revoke his parole. However, he is free to leave Iran while on parole.

Kokabee was charged with “communicating with a hostile government” and receiving “illegitimate funds.” In an open letter from Evin prison, Kokabee wrote that his imprisonment was because of "his refusal to heed pressure by Iranian intelligence agents to collaborate on a military research project."

== Activism and recognition ==
In July 2013, a meeting took place in Barcelona (where Kokabee obtained his master's degree) entitled "Knowledge in jail: Why are there hundreds of scientists in the prisons of the world?" The Science and Technology section of the Ateneu Barcelonès organized the discussion. Kokabee's case received special attention. SPIE Past President María Yzuel of the Universitat Autònoma de Barcelona decried situations wherein scientists and researchers are controlled in their academic years, recalling memories of colleagues monitored or controlled by the Franco government.

On September 23, 2013, the American Physical Society, the principal professional society of United States physicists, announced that Kokabee has been selected as a co-recipient of its 2014 Andrei Sakharov Prize, which recognizes outstanding leadership of scientists upholding human rights. He was cited for "his courage in refusing to use his physics knowledge to work on projects that he deemed harmful to humanity in the face of extreme physical and psychological pressure".

On November 16, 2013, Amnesty International sponsored an event in Washington, DC, entitled "Iran: Silencing Scientists and Squelching Scholarship." The panel discussion was billed as a dialogue on how to address the repression of academic freedom in Iran; featuring the case of Omid Kokabee. On November 19, 2013, Amnesty International released a public statement declaring Kokabee a "prisoner of conscience, held solely for his refusal to work on military projects in Iran and as a result of spurious charges related to his legitimate scholarly ties with academic institutions outside of Iran." With that statement, Amnesty launched a campaign calling for his immediate and unconditional release.

On October 27, 2014, the American Association for the Advancement of Science (AAAS), the largest general science association in the world, selected Kokabee as the recipient of the 2014 Scientific Freedom and Responsibility Award "for his courageous stand and willingness to endure imprisonment rather than violate his moral stance that his scientific expertise not be used for destructive purposes and for his efforts to provide hope and education to fellow prisoners".

== See also ==
- Joseph Rotblat
- Andrei Sakharov
- Eugene Chudnovsky
