= Sharafi =

Sharafi (Persian: شرفی) may refer to:

- Sharafi, Iran, a village in Khuzestan Province, Iran
- Amir Sharafi (b. 1991), Iranian footballer
- Asghar Sharafi (b. 1942), Iranian football coach
- Jalal Sharafi, Iranian diplomat; see Kidnapping of Jalal Sharafi
- Kalim Sharafi (1924–2010), Bangladeshi singer
