= Hasbeh =

Hasbeh may refer to:

- Ghadir Habseh
- Hasbeh-i-Kochek
