= United States raid on the Iranian Liaison Office in Erbil =

2007 military operation in Iraqi Kurdistan

On January 11, 2007, the United States military raided the Iranian Liaison Office (which was in the process of becoming accredited as an officially recognized consulate) in Erbil, Kurdistan Region, Iraq, ostensibly to detain two senior Iranian officials, but captured five mid-level diplomats instead. The U.S. government's position is that the office was used by the Iranian Islamic Revolutionary Guard Corps (IRGC) as a local headquarters. However, both Iranian and Kurdish officials state that it was a diplomatic mission in the city of Erbil.

Iraqi Kurdistan condemned the raid. Iran argued that the raid was illegal. The U.S. said this action was required under the U.S.–Iraq Status of Forces Agreement. Iran retaliated with similar raids.

On July 9, 2009, U.S. authorities released the five diplomats (Mohsen Bagheri, Mahmoud Farhadi, Majid Ghaemi, Majid Daghari and Abbas Jami), after more than two and a half years imprisonment.

== The raid ==
According to Iranian officials, five U.S. helicopters landed on the roof of the Liaison Office in Erbil. U.S. soldiers entered the building, detained five people and took away materials. The raid occurred between 3 and 5 a.m., when the U.S. troops entered the Liaison Office after disarming the guards. Two senior local Kurdish officials said the forces confiscated computers and documents.

In a report which was later confirmed by Masoud Barzani, the President of the Kurdistan Regional Government, The Independent noted that instead of the current captives, the U.S. had hoped to capture the deputy head of the Iranian Supreme National Security Council, Mohammed Jafari, and chief of intelligence of the IRGC, General Manuchehr Frouzandeh, who were on an official visit to Iraq ostensibly to improve co-operation in the area of bilateral security, during which they met the Iraqi President Jalal Talabani. Barzani stated: "They (the commanders) came here and they came openly. Their meetings with the president and myself were reported on television. The Americans came to detain this delegation, not the people in the office. They came to the wrong place at the wrong time." It was also reported that U.S. troops attempted to detain people at the Erbil International Airport that same day, but Kurdish forces intervened. Iraqi Foreign Minister Hoshyar Zebari said that there was almost a confrontation between U.S. and Kurdish troops at the airport but that "a massacre was avoided at the last minute".

The raid took place within hours of U.S. President George W. Bush claiming "Iran is providing material support for attacks on American troops" in an address to the nation.

This was not the first time the United States had arrested alleged IRGC members in Iraq. A few weeks before, on December 29, U.S. forces in Iraq released alleged Iranian IRGC members who were detained for alleged weapons smuggling after a raid conducted December 21 in Baghdad.

== US raid on Iranian Liaison Office in Erbil (1992) ==
The Iranian Liaison Office in Erbil has been active and operating since 1992. The various governments dispute the exact status of the office.

According to Iraqi Foreign Minister Hoshyar Zebari, the detained Iranians had been working in Erbil with official sanction, and the Liaison Office was in the process of becoming a full consulate; however, the office was yet to be classified as a consulate with diplomatic protection.

Iran states that based on an agreement between the governments of Iran and Iraq its status was officially changed to a Consulate General, and official note verbale (diplomatic notes) were exchanged between the two countries accordingly. According to the Vienna Convention on Consular Relations consulates enjoy immunity and all member states of the United Nations have to respect such immunity.

Officials of the Kurdistan Regional Government said that consular activities, such as the issuance of visas, had been carried out by the office staff since 1992, and they were treated as if they were accredited diplomats.

The U.S. State Department spokesman Sean McCormack said the detainees were not diplomats.

== Reactions ==
Masoud Barzani condemned the capture and demanded the quick release of Iranians. Kurdistani government was reportedly unaware of the U.S. plans to raid the Iranian Liaison Office and did not know the purpose of the operation. After raiding the office, the U.S. forces headed for Eikawa district, which hosts foreign companies and countries' representatives. Security forces of the Democratic Party of Kurdistan (KDP) reportedly surrounded three U.S. military vehicles to prevent them from further action.

Iran's Foreign Ministry spokesman Mohammad Ali Hosseini told state-run radio the raid was against a diplomatic mission since the presence of Iranian staffers in Erbil was legal. Hosseini said the action by coalition forces reflected a continuation of pressure on Iran, aiming to "create tension" between Iraq and its neighbors.

In Tehran, Iran summoned the ambassadors of Iraq and Switzerland (which represents U.S. interests in Iran) over the consulate raid.

The UN Secretary General's described the incident as "disputes between individual states". A UN spokesman said "We've left it to the respective countries to work it out among themselves [...] Ultimately it's up to Security Council members themselves to determine how its resolutions get implemented."

On March 10 at a meeting of envoys in Baghdad, the Iranian delegation raised the issue of the five detained Iranians. A U.S. spokesman said that Iraq had asked the U.S. side to investigate the circumstances involving the detention. Iran says it was assured by Iraq that the five would be released by March 21, Nowruz (Iranian New Year).

Some claim that the increased diplomatic tension created by this incident lead to the Iranian arrest of 15 Royal Navy personnel in a border dispute two months later.

=== Alleged retaliation ===
According to American journalist Robin Wright, the 2007 arrest of fifteen British sailors in the Persian Gulf was likely connected to the holding of the five Iranian officials. The arrest of the British came three days after Nowruz, a date that the Iranian government had announced that it expected the five officials to be freed by, and which passed without their release. "The common denominator was the Revolutionary Guards." Iranians being held by the U.S. were "Quds Force operatives" (the foreign operation branch of the Revolutionary Guards), while the Iranian naval unit that had taken the British hostage were also Revolutionary Guards. When the sailors were released twelve days later and the five Iranians remained in detained, "Tehran shifted its focus", according to Wright. One month later, four Iranian Americans with dual nationalities—Ali Shakeri, Haleh Esfandiari, Kian Tajbakhsh, Parnaz Azima—were detained for unspecified "crimes against national security".

== In custody ==
The Iranian consular officers were: Naser Bagheri, Mousa Chegini, Abbas Hatami Kakavand, Hamid Askari Shokouh and Majid Ghaemi.

Under Iraqi law, detainees identified as insurgents should be charged in civilian courts. They may be held up to 14 days before being brought before a magistrate. These requirements appear to be systematically ignored in practice. In this incident, the Iraqi government denies that the detainees were helping insurgents.

In 2008, three of the five Iranian detainees were being held at a U.S. prison camp in Iraq. According to the United States Department of Defense, they were under interrogation and the U.S. had "no plans to free them while they are seen as a security risk in Iraq". An International Committee of the Red Cross representative met the five Iranian employees in March 2008 and reported "they were in good health". After its first consular meeting with the captives, Iran announced that the "[detainees] have complained about their kidnapping, the US attitude and non-observance of international regulations".

=== Release of some Iranians ===
On November 9, 2007, the United States released two of the detainees (after 305 days) as well as 7 other Iranian citizens. The other seven Iranians being freed had been picked up in different parts of the country and held for periods ranging between three months and three years. The list of those who were released is as follows:

- Mousa Chegini
- Hamid Reza Askari
- Adel Moradi
- Mohammad Ali Ahmadi
- Ebrahim Mowlaei
- Raed Saeedi
- Azam Karami
- Habib Ghorbani
- Mohammad Jafar Makki Mohammad

"The release followed a careful review of individual records to determine if they posed a security threat to Iraq, and if their detention was of continued intelligence value", the American officials said in a statement.

== See also ==
- 1982 kidnapping of Iranian diplomats
- Deportation of Iranian students at US airports
- Iran hostage crisis
- Iranian involvement in the Iraq War
- Kidnapping of Jalal Sharafi
- United States kill or capture strategy in Iraq
- Attack on the Iranian Embassy in London (2018)
- Iran–United States relations during the G.W. Bush administration
