= Esha Momeni =

Iranian-American activist (c.1980)

Esha Momeni (born c. 1980, Los Angeles) is an Iranian-American scholar and women's rights activist. She was a member of One Million Signatures campaign.

While working on her master thesis in Iran, she was arrested in October and November 2008, and subsequently prevented from leaving Iran. She is a citizen of both Iran and the USA.

== Background ==
The Momeni family went back to live in Iran after the 1979 Islamic revolution, but, as an adult, Esha returned to the United States to study. As a graduate student of the School of Communications, Media and Arts at California State University, Northridge campus, Momeni traveled to Iran in August 2008 to work on a master's degree. This involved making a documentary film about the women's rights movement in Iran, and she conducted interviews (in accordance with Iranian laws) with members of the One Million Signatures Campaign in Tehran as part of her California-based studies.

== Arrest and detention ==
Esha Momeni was arrested on 15 October 2008 while going to conduct her last interview in Tehran. She was then held at Evin Prison. Iranian human rights lawyer Mohammad Ali Dadkhah represented her, although prison authorities illegally prevented him from visiting her there. He quoted officials of the Islamic Revolutionary Court as saying her detention related to involvement in the One Million Signatures (or "Change for Equality") campaign launched by women in Iran in September 2006.

Momeni was released in November 2008 on a $200,000 bail after three weeks in prison, but was not allowed to leave Iran. She was released and returned to Los Angeles on 11 August 2009.

== Charges ==
The law of Iran does not require a permit to make video recordings in private homes. The "One Million Signatures Campaign" is considered a non-political organization. It is legal in Iran to advocate against discriminatory laws through peaceful means. According to Iranian lawyer, Nasrin Sotoodeh, "Criticizing the law is not illegal in any part of the world, including Iran".

Iranian President Mahmoud Ahmadinejad told the United Nations that Iranian citizens have the right to express themselves freely. However, many members of the One Million Signatures Campaign have been arrested for "propaganda against the state". US-Iranians Kian Tajbakhsh, Haleh Esfandiari, and Ali Shakeri were imprisoned on these grounds. Amnesty International, and the Observatory for the Protection of Human Rights Defenders (run by OMCT and FIDH) believe Esha's arrest is part of a systematic plan to discourage women activists from exercising their rights for equality. The Presidency of the European Union described her detention as a "violation of human rights".

An official Iranian spokesperson, Alireza Jamshidi, said that Momeni was charged with "acting against national security".

== Career ==
After her release, Momeni became a lecturer at the Department of Gender Studies at University of California, Los Angeles. She received her Ph.D. in Gender Studies from UCLA in 2019. Her dissertation was entitled "The Politics of Collective Mourning: Negotiating Power at the Intersection of Shi’ism, Gender, and Popular Culture in Iran."

== Honors ==
On 1 May 2009, Momeni was honored in her absence with the Kappa Tau Alpha Outstanding Service Award at CSU Northridge. She returned to Los Angeles in summer 2009 and graduated from CSUN in 2010.

== See also ==
- List of foreign nationals detained in Iran
