= Iranian involvement in the Iraq War =

Location of the Republic of Iraq (orange) and the Islamic Republic of Iran (green)

The 2003 invasion of Iraq led by the U.S., which toppled Iraqi president Saddam Hussein and his Arab Socialist Ba'ath Party, was the decisive event that allowed Iran to begin exerting an unprecedented level of influence on Iraqi politics. Leveraging the fact that the regime change targeted a rival power and Shia Muslims accounting for the majority of the population in both countries, the Iranian government used Shia militias to serve its interests during the Iraq War. This culminated in a complex series of events from Iran's aiding U.S. coalition efforts to later involvement in the Iraqi insurgency, in which there were instances of Shia militias fighting both alongside and against the Multi-National Force in Iraq. Organizations that enjoyed large-scale Iranian support included the Badr Corps, as well as Kata'ib Hezbollah, Asa'ib Ahl al-Haq, and the Promised Day Brigade. Since 2007, the United States has employed a "kill or capture" strategy with regard to confronting Iranian operatives in the Iraqi conflict.

== Background ==
=== Iran–United States relations ===
After condemning the September 11 attacks, and expressing sympathy with bereaved Americans, Iran briefly cooperated with the United States in late 2001, providing limited military support against the Taliban in Afghanistan, including operations in Herat. However, in early 2002, president George W. Bush labeled Iran part of an "axis of evil" along with Iraq and North Korea, sharply worsening relations. Iranian leaders across the political spectrum condemned the remark, viewing it as a strategic error that strengthened hardliners who favored a more confrontational stance toward the United States.

=== Iran–Iraq relations ===
In September 1980, Iraq under Saddam Hussein launched an invasion of Iran in an unsuccessful attempt to annex oil-rich Iranian territory, marking the beginning of a war that would last until 1988. The Iran–Iraq War is regarded as being a major trigger for rising sectarianism in the region, as it was viewed by many as a clash between Sunni Muslims (Ba'athist Iraq and other Arab States) and the Shia revolutionaries that had taken power in Iran.

In a declassified 1991 report, the CIA estimated that Iran had suffered more than 50,000 casualties from Iraq's use of several chemical weapons, though modern estimates have reached more than 100,000, as the long-term effects continued to cause casualties; they also show that the United States was providing reconnaissance intelligence to Iraq around 1987–88, which was then used to launch chemical weapon attacks on Iranian troops, and that the CIA fully knew that chemical weapons would be deployed and sarin and cyclosarin attacks followed. According to Iraqi documents, assistance in developing chemical weapons was obtained from firms in many countries, including the United States.

In January 2002, one year before the U.S.-led invasion of Iraq, bilateral relations between Iran and Iraq improved significantly when an Iranian delegation, led by Amir Hussein Zamani, visited Iraq for final negotiations to resolve the conflict through talks on issues of prisoners of war and those who went missing in action during the Iran–Iraq War.

== Alleged Iranian support for the invasion ==
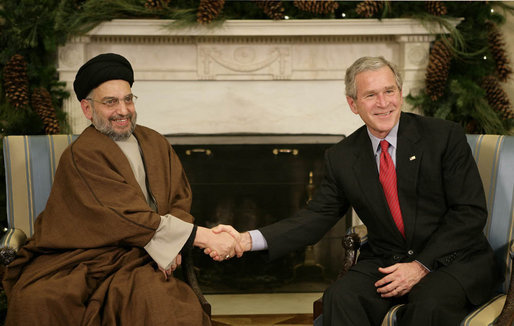
SCIRI's leader Abdal Aziz al-Hakim, one of the prominent Iranian-backed former opposition figures in Iraq, his political career was posthumously praised by Ali Khamenei and Hassan Nasrallah

Following the Gulf War the United States adopted a policy of sponsoring Iraqi dissidents to rely on in creating a post-Saddam order, many of whom were Shia Islamists who had lived in Iran and had direct ties with Tehran, which incentivized the Iranian government to aid the regime change efforts contrary to its public rhetoric.

Prior to the invasion, the U.S. assured Iran through backchannels that it would not be targeted next. Iranian-trained militias such as the Badr Corps and members of the Islamic Revolutionary Guard Corps crossed the Iranian border in 2003 and took active part in the invasion, establishing communication with the coalition and pacifying the resistance in Basra and later aiding the counter-insurgency in Fallujah, Badr's Persian-speaking leader Hadi Al-Amiri served as an intermediary between the US occupiers and Tehran. Iran-backed former opposition groups such as Supreme Council for the Islamic Revolution in Iraq and Islamic Dawa Party publicly supported the invasion and later took up senior roles in the newly established government. The Wolf Brigade, an offshot of Badr notorious for its war crimes, led by a SCIRI official 'Abu Walid', fought alongside U.S.-led forces in Mosul. The growth of Iranian-backed Shia militias at this time and their increasing influence over local security services was ignored by the U.S. due to their effectiveness at fighting the Sunni-led insurgency despite fueling sectarian tensions.

Some Iranian officials including Mahmoud Ahmadinejad, Muhammad Khatami and Mohsen Rezaee have mentioned Iran's cooperation with the U.S. in Iraq, lamenting its inclusion in the "axis of evil".

== Iran and the Iraqi insurgency ==
=== Iranian aid for Iraqi Shia militias ===
In the aftermath of the 2003 invasion of Iraq, Iran supported Shi'ite insurgent groups dubbed the Special Groups in Iraq, which were made up by the Mahdi army, Kata'ib Hezbollah, Asa'ib Ahl al-Haq, and the Promised Day Brigade. The U.S. used the Iraqi government to fight these insurgents as a result. A 2008 report by the Combating Terrorism Center at West Point based on reports from the interrogations of dozens of captured Shia fighters described an Iranian-run network smuggling Shia fighters into Iran where they received training and weapons before returning to Iraq.

According to two unnamed US officials, the Pentagon is examining the possibility that the Karbala provincial headquarters raid was supported by Iranians. In a speech on 31 January 2007, Iraqi Prime Minister Nouri al-Maliki stated that Iran was supporting attacks against Coalition forces in Iraq, and some Iraqis suspect that the raid may have been perpetrated by the Quds Force in retaliation for the detention of five Iranian officials by US forces in the northern Iraqi city of Irbil on 11 January.

In 2007, tensions increased greatly between Iran and Iraqi Kurdistan due to the latter's giving sanctuary to the militant Kurdish secessionist group Party for a Free Life in Kurdistan (PEJAK). According to reports, Iran had been shelling PEJAK positions in Iraqi Kurdistan since 16 August. These tensions further increased with an alleged border incursion on 23 August by Iranian troops who attacked several Kurdish villages killing an unknown number of civilians and militants.

=== Covert Iranian military involvement ===
An estimated 150 Iranian intelligence officers, plus members of Iran's Islamic Revolutionary Guard Corps, are believed to be active inside Iraq at any given time. For more than a year, U.S. troops have detained and recorded fingerprints, photographs, and DNA samples from dozens of suspected Iranian agents in a catch and release program designed to intimidate the Iranian leadership.

Coalition forces also began to target alleged Iranian Quds Force operatives in Iraq, either arresting or killing suspected members. The Bush administration and coalition leaders began to publicly state that Iran was supplying weapons, particularly EFP devices, to Iraqi insurgents and militias although to date have failed to provide any proof for these allegations. Further sanctions on Iranian organizations were also announced by the Bush administration in the autumn of 2007. On 21 November 2007, Lieutenant General James Dubik, who is in charge of training Iraqi security forces, praised Iran for its "contribution to the reduction of violence" in Iraq by upholding its pledge to stop the flow of weapons, explosives, and training of extremists in Iraq.

Hezbollah as Iran's proxy, formed Unit 3800 and sent elite Hezbollah operatives to Iraq to train local fighters. The unit's primary mission was to train and equip Iraqi Shiite militias, such as the Mahdi Army, Asaib Ahl al-Haq, and Kataib Hezbollah, enhancing their capabilities in guerrilla warfare, kidnappings, and the use of sophisticated improvised explosive devices (IEDs). Some Iraqi militants also received advanced training in Lebanon. The unit then oversaw operations executed against U.S. and coalition forces and provided funds, weapons, and logistical assistance to groups like the Badr Organization, Saraya al-Khorasani, and the al-Mahdi Army.

== See also ==
- Mosaic defence strategy, developed by Iran in response to the Iraq War
- Iran–PJAK conflict
- Iranian intervention in Iraq (2014–present)
- Iranian intervention in the Syrian civil war
  - Hezbollah involvement in the Syrian civil war
- Iran–Saudi Arabia proxy conflict
