= 2007 Iranian arrest of Royal Navy personnel =

2007 incident between Iran and the UK

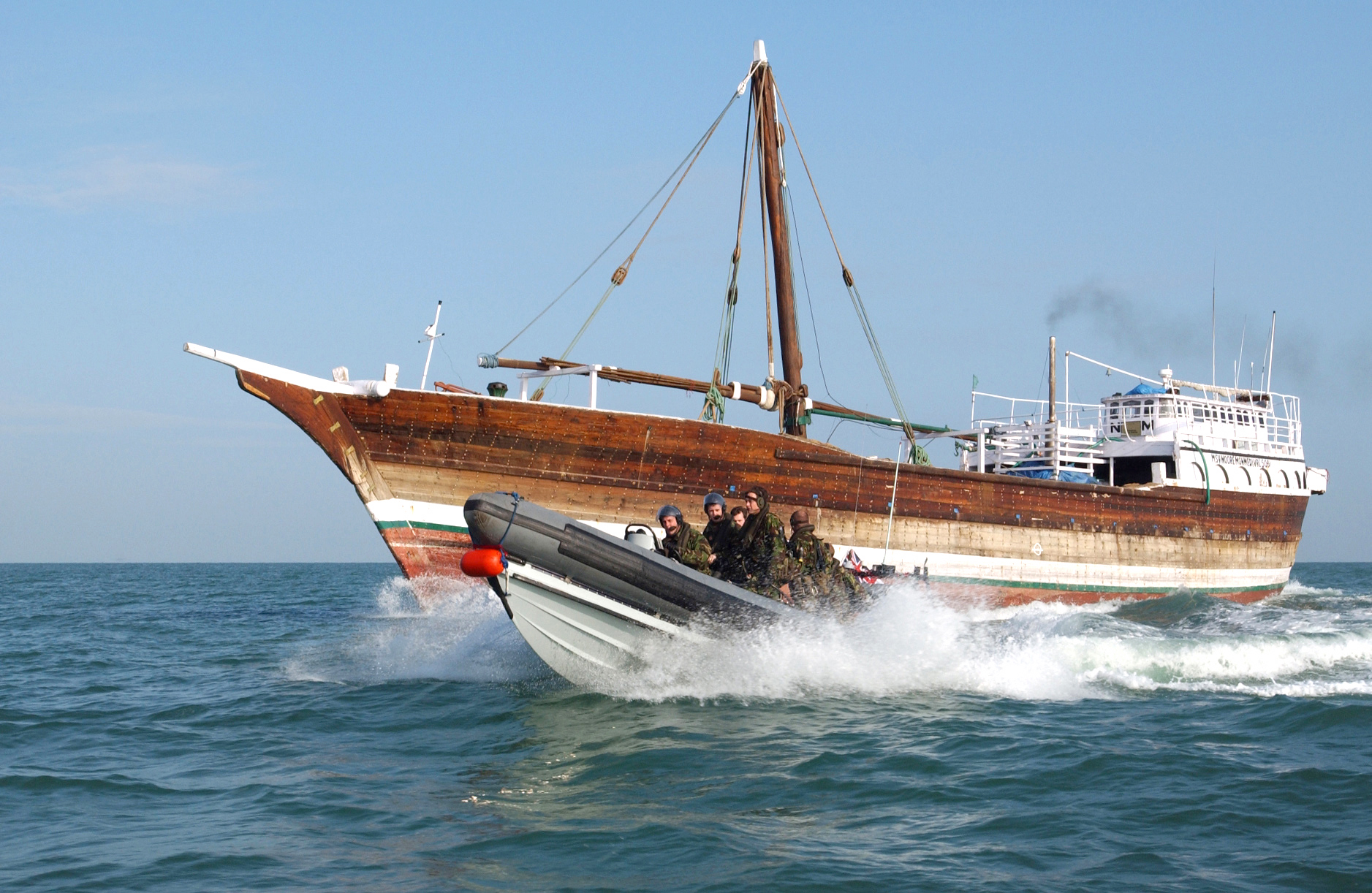
- RHIB from HMS Cardiff, intercepting a cargo vessel off Iraq in 2002. Similar to those embarked on Cornwall.
Date	23 March 2007
Location	Persian Gulf
Result	Iranian victory: Two British boats confiscated, 15 Royal Navy personnel captured

Belligerents
Royal Navy	Navy of the Islamic Revolutionary Guard Corps; Border Guard Command

Casualties and losses
15 captured	none

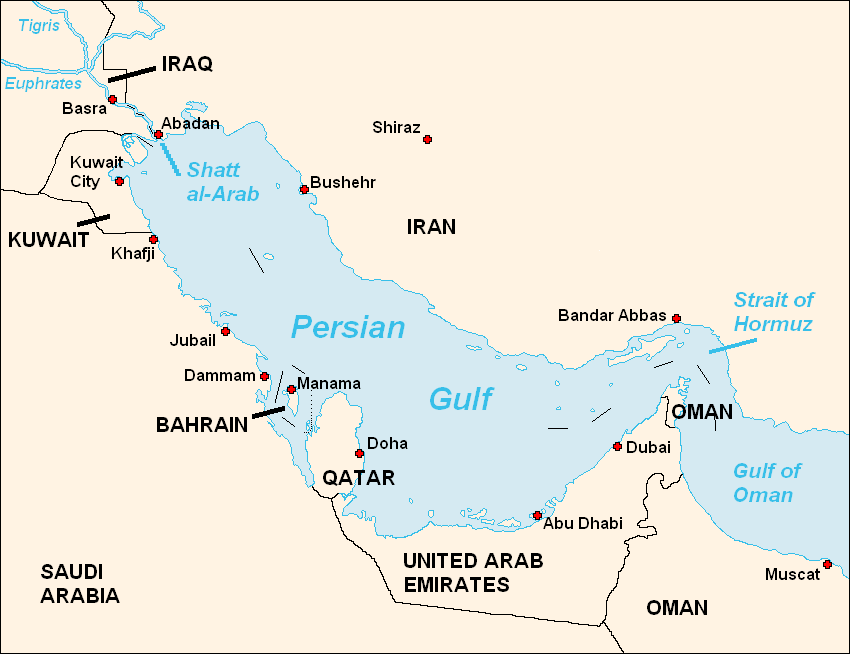
Map of the Persian Gulf

On 23 March 2007, fifteen Royal Navy personnel from HMS Cornwall were searching a merchant vessel when they were surrounded by the Navy of the Iranian Revolutionary Guards and detained off the Iran–Iraq coast. In the course of events, British forces claimed that the vessel was in Iraqi waters, but the Iranians insisted that they were in Iran's territorial waters. The fifteen personnel were released thirteen days later on 4 April 2007.

A year later, a British investigation report was released which stated that the area in which the incident took place was not covered by any formal agreement between Iran and Iraq.

== Background ==
On 23 March 2007, a team of eight sailors and seven Royal Marines in two rigid-hulled inflatable boats from the Type 22 frigate HMS Cornwall had been searching a merchant dhow for smuggled automobiles when they were detained at approximately 10:30 Arabia Standard Time (UTC+3:00) or 11:00 Iran Standard Time (UTC+3:30) by the crews of two Iranian boats; a further six Iranian boats then assisted in the seizure. The British personnel were taken to an Iranian Revolutionary Guards base in Tehran for questioning. Iranian officials claimed that the British sailors were in Iranian waters. A University of Durham analysis of the initial Iranian identification of the location of the boats showed that the position given was in Iraqi waters. According to the British Ministry of Defence (MoD), the Iranians issued a "corrected" location, which placed the boats in Iranian waters.

Information provided by Britain initially consistently placed the boats in Iraqi waters. However, the subsequent report by the House of Commons' Foreign Affairs Select Committee confirmed that the Ministry of Defence map presented to the worldwide media was "inaccurate" as it presented a boundary line when no maritime boundary between the two countries had been agreed upon, and so "The Government was fortunate that it was not in Iran's interests to contest the accuracy of the map." The Foreign Affairs Committee also criticised the government for failing to contact a key Iranian negotiator in a timely manner. Reports in April 2008, citing documents from the MoD inquiry into the incident, stated that the British sailors captured by Iran were in disputed waters, that the US-led coalition had drawn a boundary line between Iran and Iraq without informing the Iranians, and that Iranian coastal protection vessels regularly crossed this coalition-defined boundary.

The British government stated that the team had been conducting a compliance inspection of a merchant ship under the mandate of United Nations Security Council Resolution 1723. While moving along the Shatt al-Arab waterway, the merchantman had aroused the suspicion of a Royal Navy helicopter. Cornwall was part of the British contribution to multinational forces engaged in the Iraq War.

Intense diplomatic efforts were made to secure the release of the detainees. On 28 March 2007 television channels around the world showed footage released by the Iranian government of some of the fifteen British sailors. This included a statement by captured Royal Navy sailor Faye Turney, along with a letter she wrote under compulsion, which apologised for British intrusions into Iranian waters. Over the next two days a further video was shown on Iranian television displaying three of the detained Britons; and two further letters attributed to Faye Turney were released, again claiming the British boats were in Iranian waters. Iran stated that an apology from British officials would "facilitate" the release of the personnel.

== British personnel involved ==
The fifteen Royal Navy and Royal Marines personnel detained were:

- Lieutenant Felix Carman RN, the most senior British officer captured
- Captain Christopher Air RM
- Chief Petty Officer Declan McGee
- Acting Sergeant Dean Harris
- Leading Seaman Christopher Coe
- Acting Leading Seaman Faye Turney
- Lance Corporal Mark Banks
- Able Seaman Arthur Batchelor
- Able Seaman Andrew Henderson
- Able Seaman Simon Massey
- Able Seaman Nathan Thomas Summers
- Marine Paul Barton
- Marine Daniel Masterton
- Marine Adam Sperry
- Marine Joe Tindell

== Release ==
On 4 April, Iranian President Mahmoud Ahmadinejad held a news conference to announce the release of the personnel as "a gift" to Britain. When returned to the UK the group claimed to have been put under "constant psychological pressure" from the Iranian authorities. In addition, British equipment, including secure voice communication kit and navigational hardware, has not been reported as being returned.

The Ministry of Defence announced on 7 April 2007 the beginning of a "detailed inquiry" into the circumstances leading to the capture of fifteen personnel by Iran. The confidential inquiry was headed by Lieutenant General Sir Robert Fulton, the Governor of Gibraltar (and former Commandant General Royal Marines). On 22 July 2007, the House of Commons Foreign Affairs Select Committee released a report into the incident, although Fulton's report had not been released to the parliamentary committee.

== Legal treaties in force at site ==
The Algiers Agreement, ratified by both nations in 1976, remains in force. It defined the Iran-Iraq international boundary in the Shatt al-Arab by a series of precisely defined turning points closely approximating the 1975 thalweg or deepest channel, ending at point "R". Point "R", at 29°51′16″N 48°44′45″E (WGS84) is about 8.6 nautical miles (15.9 km; 9.9 mi) southeast of the tip of Iraq's Al-Faw peninsula at high tide. Point "R" is where the thalweg in 1975 was adjacent to the furthest point of exposed mud flats at "astronomical lowest low tide". Point "R" thus constitutes the end of the land boundary of the two nations, despite being under water at all but the lowest tides.

According to analysis by the International Boundary Research Unit (IBRU) at the UK's Durham University, the location provided by the Ministry of Defence for the location of the seizure is 1.7 nautical miles (3.1 km; 2.0 mi) southwest of this Point "R" boundary terminus and 1.6 nautical miles (3.0 km; 1.8 mi) south of this international boundary line. The university stated: "The point lies on the Iraqi side of...the agreed land boundary." This was challenged by Iran, whose second set of released co-ordinates were inside its waters. The location provided by the British government was not in disputed territory according to IBRU, which said the boundary was disputed only beyond Point "R" (to the east and southeast). Confirming this, Richard Schofield, an expert in international boundaries at King's College London, stated "Iran and Iraq have never agreed to a boundary of their territorial waters. There is no legal definition of the boundary beyond the Shatt al-Arab."

The Algiers Agreement came into effect after being signed by both states in 1975 and ratified by both states in 1976. Under international law, one state cannot unilaterally reject a previously ratified treaty, and the treaty had no clause providing for abrogation by one state only. A joint commission should conduct a survey of the Shatt al Arab at least every ten years. No such survey appears to have taken place, so there could be a dispute as to whether the boundary followed the line defined in 1975 or the current thalweg of the river. The IBRU contended that "it would need a dramatic reconfiguration of the coastline marked on current charts for the median line to run to the west of the point" at which MoD had stated the incident occurred, and so be in Iranian waters.

A year after the incident a British MoD investigation report was released which stated that the area in which the incident took place was not covered by any internationally agreed delineation. US forces had defined an operational boundary, but that had not been communicated to Iran, and Iranian forces crossed this operational boundary an average of 12 times per month. Since the 1975 Algiers Agreement the Shatt al-Arab channel had shifted in favour of Iran, and any Iranian notional boundary was not known to the US coalition. While innocent passage is permitted in each other's waters, boarding and compliance inspections in another state's waters would not be lawful.

== Operational environment ==
Cornwall was a Batch 3 Type 22 frigate, lead ship of the Cornwall class. It constituted part of the British contribution to Combined Task Force 158 (CTF158) which controlled maritime security operations in the Northern Persian Gulf and included Royal Navy, United States Navy, United States Coast Guard, Royal Australian Navy and Iraqi Navy forces. The task force was under the command of Commodore Nick Lambert, embarked in Cornwall with a staff from Commander United Kingdom Maritime Forces.

In a joint Five News and Sky News interview, recorded on 13 March but not broadcast until after the captured service personnel had been released, Captain Chris Air acknowledged that he was operating close to the buffer zone between Iranian and Iraqi waters, saying: "It's good to gather intelligence on the Iranians" and that one purpose of patrols in the area was to gather intelligence on "any sort of Iranian activity".

On 23 March 2007 two boats from Cornwall with the boarding team, fourteen men and one woman, conducted an unopposed boarding and compliance inspection of a merchant vessel suspected of smuggling automobiles. Following the inspection and after disembarking from the merchantman the team was detained by Iranian forces in six boats at around 10:30 Arabia Standard Time (UTC+3:00) or 11:00 Iran Standard Time (UTC+3:30), and escorted to an Iranian naval facility in the Shatt-al-Arab waterway.

Journalists on Cornwall reported that the British forces had chased and boarded a barge (or dhow) that had offloaded vehicles from the merchant ship. The merchant ship and barges, which had been observed the previous day when a barge was boarded, were suspected of smuggling.

According to Britain, Cornwall could not get closer to the merchant vessel because of shallow water. A Lynx helicopter monitoring the boarding had resumed its reconnaissance of the area, and by the time Cornwall realised what was happening the British team was already being escorted to shore by the Iranian border patrol.

Media reporting indicates that warnings of an increased risk of action by Iran, in response to the detention of Iranian officials in Iraq, had been communicated to the UK by the US Central Intelligence Agency but had not resulted in an increase in the area threat levels.

=== Rules of engagement ===
British armed forces are subject to rules of engagement which define acceptable limits on freedom of action for commanders. Extant rules were described by former First Sea Lord Admiral Sir Alan West as de-escalatory to avoid provoking an intensification of action.

It was reported that CTF158's Commander Lambert requested advice from the Ministry of Defence but was told to hold fire. British Prime Minister Tony Blair later said the attitude of the British forces had been "entirely sensible"; if they had fired there would "undoubtedly have been severe loss of life".

== Claims and reactions ==
=== British claims and reactions ===
==== Official briefings ====
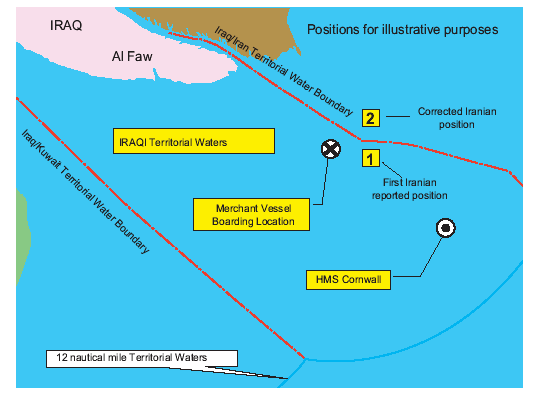
Map issued by the Ministry of Defence at a media briefing on the position of Royal Navy personnel when arrested by Iran. The Foreign Affairs Select Committee inquiry later found that this map was "less clear than it ought to have been" after hearing evidence that the water boundary shown had merged the land boundary that follows the Shatt al-Arab waterway and about 8 nautical miles (15 km) of land exposed at low tide with the median line between the two unshown low water lines, and that the 1975 Algiers Agreement "southern terminal point ... lies just under 1.7 nautical miles northeast of the position" shown on this map.

The United Kingdom government stated the sailors were on a routine patrol of the area which was in accordance with United Nations Security Council Resolution 1723. The Ministry of Defence indicated that the sailors had boarded the vessel 1.7 nautical miles (3.1 km; 2.0 mi) inside Iraqi territorial waters at 29°50.36′N 48°43.08′E. The Ministry of Defence stated that one of the boats remained data-linked to Cornwall throughout the operation and the GPS system showed them to be located well within the Iraqi area, although no direct evidence for this was given. According to British authorities, this position was later confirmed by an Indian-flagged merchant vessel which, the Ministry of Defence indicated, had dragged east on its anchor to 29°50.174′N 48°43.544′E (as shown in a photograph released by the Ministry).

Senior British military officers stated at a press conference on 29 March that there was no doubt where the dividing line between Iraqi and Iranian waters was, despite historic disputes between Iran and Iraq over those waters. However, this was disputed later by the Foreign Affairs Select Committee report into the incident which concluded that "there is evidence to suggest that the map of the Shatt al-Arab waterway provided by the Government was less clear than it ought to have been. The Government was fortunate that it was not in Iran's interests to contest the accuracy of the map."

Communication with the boarding team was lost at 09:10 and Cornwall's Lynx helicopter returned to the scene immediately, having covered the initial stages of the operation. The pilot and the master of the merchant vessel stated that Iranian vessels surrounded the boarding team and escorted them away. The British boats were seen being taken up the Shatt-al-Arab waterway by Iranian Islamic Republican Guard Navy vessels.

According to the Ministry of Defence, the Iranian government provided two sets of co-ordinates for the incident, the first of which was inside Iraqi waters. The Ministry says that upon challenging the set, a second set of co-ordinates was provided indicating a position within Iranian waters less than one nautical mile (1.9 km; 1.2 mi) away from the first set.

British special forces based in Baghdad began planning a contingency rescue effort. In support, Joint Special Operations Command scrambled a Predator drone to assist them but the window of opportunity for a rescue mission to take place closed when the captives were moved north to Tehran.

The British government demanded the return of the personnel. Foreign Secretary Margaret Beckett said, "We sought a full explanation of what happened and left the Iranian authorities in no doubt that we expect immediate and safe return of our service personnel and boats." Prime Minister Tony Blair denied the British boats were in Iranian waters and called the detainment "unjustified and wrong".

==== Press and other coverage ====
The Times raised concerns about what it termed a hostage crisis with the headline "Hostage fears over troops seized by Iran" on its front page on 24 March. The detainees were also routinely described as "hostages" by other newspapers.

The BBC apologised to the anti-war group Campaign Against Sanctions and Military Intervention in Iran (CASMII) for having used the words "abducted" and "hostages" in relation to the events. CASMII member Abbas Edalat was not satisfied with the apology, stating "We do not accept that because a story is at an 'early stage' misleading reports are therefore acceptable."

Former Head of the Maritime Section at the Foreign & Commonwealth Office, Craig Murray, a vocal critic of the current British government, wrote that an agreed Iran/Iraq maritime boundary, as shown on the British government provided map, did not exist: "There is no agreed maritime boundary between Iraq and Iran in the Persian Gulf. Until the current mad propaganda exercise of the last week, nobody would have found that in the least a controversial statement." Murray noted that the Algiers Agreement required reviews every ten years of the position of the border within the Shatt al-Arab as the thalweg of the river shifts, but these had not been carried out, making even the internal waters border open to dispute. Murray was concerned that the map, notably unfavourable to Iran, could only harden the Iranian position delaying the return of the captives. He stressed that, equally, Iran could not say definitively that the UK crew had been in its waters.

However, Murray's views appeared to conflict with the official position of the Iranian Government: in an interview for the Financial Times on 6 April the Iranian Ambassador in London Rasoul Movahedian made it clear that there was no disputed border line in the area where the incident took place and that it was the coordinates of the Royal Navy boats when detained that were the subject of the dispute between the UK and Iranian Governments.

Some sections of the British press reacted angrily to the Iranian television footage of the detainees, particularly the prominence of servicewoman Faye Turney, and that she was seen wearing a head scarf. According to Iranian laws, all females above the age of 13 are required to observe the Islamic dress code of Iran.

=== Iranian claims and reactions ===
==== Official briefings ====
Iran's director general for Western European affairs, Ibrahim Rahimpour, said that the British boats had made "illegal entry" into Iranian territorial waters and that the personnel "were arrested by border guards for investigation and questioning". Mohammad Ali Hosseini, an Iranian Foreign Ministry spokesman, voiced his country's discontent at what he called "blatant aggression", accusing the United Kingdom of "violating the sovereign boundaries of other states". He further stated that Britain was trying to cover up the incursion. On 24 March, the Iranian Fars News Agency said the navigational equipment seized on the British boats shows the sailors were aware that they were operating in Iranian waters. On the same day, General Alireza Afshar, a top military official, said the sailors had confessed to illegal entry into Iran's waters.

Foreign minister Manouchehr Mottaki said on 25 March that they were considering charging the British personnel with illegal entry into Iranian waters. On 29 March, the Iranian navy displayed captured GPS devices, saying that they indicated the boats were 450 metres (1,480 ft) inside Iranian territorial waters at the time they were seized. It further stated: "After reading the information on their navigation equipment – the GPS seized from them – it was revealed that they had already intruded water borders of the Islamic Republic of Iran [5 times]". The chart that was used in the demonstration is marked at 29°51′9″N 48°45′11″E.

According to the Iranian consul-general in Basra, Ridha Nasir Baghban, on 29 March a group of British soldiers surrounded his consulate at about 10 a.m. and fired their weapons in the air. Baghban, who called the alleged incident a "provocative act", stated in a telephone interview with the Associated Press that "British forces should rely on wisdom and not react because of the British forces' detention. This reflects negatively on bilateral relations". The British denied Baghban's allegations, with British Army spokesman Major David Gell stating that the incident was "geographic coincidence" after a British military convoy was fired on by insurgents and returned fire near the consulate.

On 30 March Iran's ambassador to Russia said, "The legal phase concerning these British soldiers has started and if charges against them are proven, they will be punished". The ambassador did not specify what the legal moves were. The ambassador suggested a diplomatic settlement was still possible "if Britain's government admits its mistake and apologises to Iran for its naval personnel's trespassing of Iranian territorial waters, the issue can be easily settled." He expressed regret that the British government had raised the issue to an international level instead of trying to resolve the problem through diplomatic channels.

On 31 March, Baghban further claimed that British forces were carrying out "provocative acts", stating that there has been intensive flying of fighter aircraft over the consulate building. Al-Hayat newspaper reported that the actions might be a scare tactic to pressure Iran into releasing the detainees. Iran's President Mahmoud Ahmadinejad commented on the seizure for the first time on 31 March by calling Britain "arrogant" for failing to apologise for entering Iranian waters. In a press conference on 4 April 2007, President Ahmadinejad gave a history of Iran leading to an analysis of the Iranian view of world political asymmetry. He continued to comment on the bravery and courage of the Iranian coastguard and presented them all with the Medal of Honour. President Ahmadinejad then attacked British forces for sending out a woman with a child at home as part of a military force. He then announced that the sailors would be released as a "gift" to Britain.

==== Press and other coverage ====
The Persian Journal reported that the 1975 Algiers agreement that defined the current Iran-Iraq boundary did not delimit the border beyond the shoreline into the territorial seas in the Persian Gulf, where Iran and Iraq had different approaches to the method that should be used. Iran wished to divide its maritime boundaries on the basis of the equidistance principle, whereas Iraq believed the entrance of the Persian Gulf required special criteria. The incident may have happened in an area that both sides considered as their own territory. Military units may have had the right of innocent passage in each other's waters, but the incident involved boarding and compliance inspection and was not simple innocent passage under the 1982 United Nations Convention on the Law of the Sea.

Students from the Basij group, a paramilitary wing of the Iranian Revolutionary Guard, called for the Britons to be put on trial, while the editor of Iran News, Dr Ali Pahlavan, stated that the Revolutionary Guard felt that the United Kingdom and the United States had to be challenged.

On 1 April students from Tehran University protested outside the British embassy in the capital, making speeches and throwing firecrackers and rocks into the embassy compound. A BBC correspondent reported they were chanting "death to England" and calling for a trial and apology. The crowd was dispersed by pepper spray fired by riot police.

On 2 April, the two captured officers were shown on Iran's Alam-TV, in front of a map of the Persian Gulf area which showed a position for the capture inside Iran's waters. Carman said, "[...] I would like to say to the Iranian people, 'I can understand why you are so angry about our intrusion into your waters'".

On 3 April, Patrick Cockburn in The Independent gave new details about a US raid which captured five Iranians in Arbil ten weeks before this incident, suggesting that it was a serious escalation in the confrontation between the US and Iran, and was the reason behind Iran seizing the British sailors.

=== Iraqi statements ===
On 24 March, Brigadier General Hakim Jassim, Iraqi military commander of the country's territorial waters, gave an interview with Associated Press. He doubted the British claims, saying: "We were informed by Iraqi fishermen after they had returned from sea that there were British gunboats in an area that is out of Iraqi control. We do not know why they were there."

On 25 March, the Iraqi foreign minister, Hoshiyar Zebari, urged Iran to release the detained personnel, in a telephone call to his Iranian counterpart. In a statement released, he said that "according to the information available to the Iraqi authorities those soldiers were detained inside Iraqi waters. They were working with the multi-national forces with the approval of the Iraqi government and according to U.N. Security Council resolutions."

=== International reactions ===
==== Multinational organisations ====
- European Union – German Chancellor Angela Merkel, who then held the rotating presidency of the Council of the European Union, expressed its full support of the United Kingdom, saying in a speech to the European Parliament that "I would also like to use this opportunity of being in this house to tell you that the EU finds it fully unacceptable that 15 British troops have been captured and detained by Iran".
- United Nations – The Security Council made a statement expressing its members' [the term "members of the Security Council" rather than "the Security Council" was used] "grave concern" at Iran's actions, urged Tehran to allow the UK consular access to its personnel, and encouraged an early resolution including the release of all fifteen crew members. Attempts by the British to obtain a stronger statement were defeated by opposition on the council, led by Russia.

==== Asia ====
- Japan – Foreign Minister Taro Aso made repeated calls to Iranian officials to free the detained Royal Navy sailors after he had personally spoken to Iranian Foreign Minister Manouchehr Mottaki about releasing them unconditionally.

==== Europe ====
- Norway – expressed its full support of the demands made by the European Union for the immediate release of the fifteen Royal Navy soldiers, but also hoped that the situation would not escalate. On 30 March, the State Secretary of the Ministry of Foreign Affairs Raymond Johansen said in a statement to NRK that: "It is very important that the conflict between Iran and the European nations does not escalate. We have to find an immediate solution to this problem."
- Sweden – Foreign Minister Carl Bildt said in a statement that: "It is quite obvious that the Iranians are conducting a kidnapping, and that cannot be accepted."
- Belgium – Foreign Minister Karel De Gucht expressed his deep concern on the situation, and stressed the fact that a dialogue needed to be opened not only for this particular issue but for the Iranian nuclear programme as well.

==== North America ====
- Canada – The government called for the immediate release of the British personnel and also gave support for the UK's version of events and location of the abduction. Minister of Foreign Affairs Peter MacKay went on to say, "This is an unacceptable incident. Iran has no authority to conduct military operations within Iraqi territorial waters. British forces are operating in Iraq under UN authority and at the invitation of the Government of Iraq." and "The British personnel were engaged in legitimate and routine boarding operations of merchant shipping in Iraqi territorial waters in support of the Government of Iraq. Canadian naval ships have conducted the same type of operations in this area under the same mandate."
- United States – The White House said that US President George W. Bush pledged his support to the British government over the crisis and agreed to help them in any way that he could. Furthermore, on 1 April President Bush at a press conference at Camp David said that "The British hostages issue is a serious issue because the Iranians took these people out of Iraqi water".

The Senate passed a resolution condemning Iran's conduct "in the strongest possible terms" and calling for the "immediate, safe and unconditional release" of the sailors; the House of Representatives did not. The House Foreign Affairs Committee issued a statement demanding the release of the Marines, stating that "The government of Iran has once again ignored international law by seizing sailors in waters outside their jurisdiction"
The Navy dispatched two Nimitz-class supercarriers (USS John C. Stennis and USS Dwight D. Eisenhower, with approximately 50 F/A-18 Super Hornet fighter jets each) as well as 15 other warships to the Persian Gulf. The Navy maintained that the battle group was dispatched to the Persian Gulf before Iran detained the British sailors, and that this was not a show of force in response to Iran.

==== Oceania ====
- Australia – called for the immediate release of the British sailors. Foreign Minister Alexander Downer made a statement saying Australia was seriously concerned for the British personnel and urged Iran to release them immediately.

==== Other ====
- The UK-based pan-Arabic newspaper Asharq Al-Awsat quoted an unnamed source whom they identified as "a source close to the command of Quds Force" that said the detention of coalition military personnel had been planned as early as 18 March. The newspaper stated that the Iranians would release the personnel if the US military released the five liaison office employees they had detained earlier in the year in Iraq, and that this operation had been planned in advance as a tactic to bargain for the release of the detainees.
- Pope Benedict XVI sent a written appeal to Iran's top authority, Ayatollah Ali Khamenei, seeking the release of fifteen British military personnel who were captured in the Persian Gulf. The Pope, just hours before the group's release, had asked Khamenei to "do what he could to ensure that the British sailors and marines were reunited with their families in time for Easter". "It would, (the Pope) said, be a significant religious gesture of goodwill from the Iranian people", The Guardian reported.
- On 25 March, The Sunday Times quoted a website, which it said was run by supporters of Iranian President Mahmoud Ahmadinejad, that the sailors and marines could be indicted for espionage in an Iranian court. Espionage is punishable by death in Iran. The Sunday Times confirmed the Asharq Alawsat statement on the detainees, quoting an unidentified person that the situation could be resolved through a prisoner swap.

== Diplomatic actions ==
The Iranian ambassador to the UK was summoned to the Foreign and Commonwealth Office on 23 March to see Peter Ricketts, the Permanent Under-Secretary at the Foreign Office, was asked to explain the incident and told that Britain required the servicemen to be returned. He was summoned again on 24 March to see Lord Triesman, a junior foreign office minister, to reiterate Britain's demand that the personnel be released with their equipment.

On 25 March the British ambassador to Iran went to the Iranian foreign ministry. The Iranians said he had been summoned so they could protest against "the illegal entry of British sailors into Iranian territorial waters". However the British said the meeting was at their request and that they had asked both for the immediate release of the personnel and for consular access to them. Prime Minister Tony Blair said if diplomacy fails he will take other measures to release the British sailors and marines. When asked what other measures he refused to answer directly if military action was a possibility.

On 28 March, Iranian Foreign Minister Manouchehr Mottaki stated that British servicewoman Faye Turney would be released by 29 March, at the latest. He maintained that the British personnel were illegally operating in Iranian waters, but stated that their presence may have been an honest mistake.

On 29 March the head of Iran's supreme national security council, Ali Larijani, announced a suspension of the release of Faye Turney, stating that the announcement of the release had been met with an "incorrect attitude". Meanwhile, Ban Ki-moon, Secretary-General of the United Nations, had been meeting with Iranian officials during a summit in Riyadh. A letter supposedly written by Faye Turney calling for British troops to be withdrawn from Iraq was also published by Iran.

On 4 April reports emerged, later confirmed by US Defense Secretary Robert Gates, that an Iranian representative would meet the five Iranian government employees captured in January in a US raid on an Iranian liaison office in Arbil, although this would not be an official consular visit. The US rejected any suggestion that the British naval personnel would be swapped for the five Iranian officials.

== Release ==
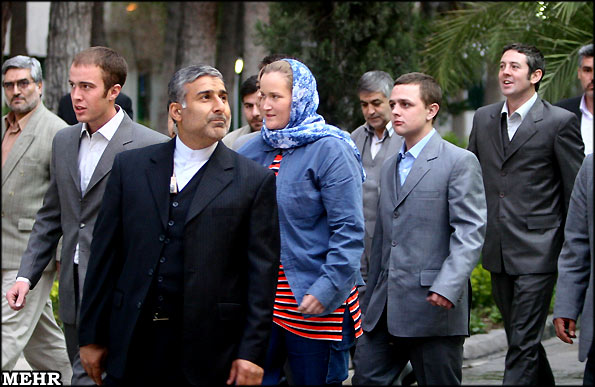
British sailors before being released

Iranian President Mahmoud Ahmadinejad unexpectedly announced the release of the captives halfway through a long press conference on the afternoon of 4 April 2007. Ahmadinejad reiterated the statement that Iranian waters had been breached, and he praised the border guards who detained the British personnel. Abolqassem Amangah, commander of Iran's southwestern Maritime Border Patrol Guard was awarded the third degree medal of bravery for stopping the sailors. Ahmadinejad also criticised the British government for sending the mother of a child to the battlefield, and asked the government "not to prosecute them for their confessions". The release was announced after the British government supposedly sent a letter of apology to the Iranian government. However, the British government denies that such a letter exists, and says that the release was performed without any agreement from both sides. Despite British denial of such a letter, on 3 June 2009, during a televised presidential debate between the sitting president Mahmoud Ahmadinejad and his rival Mir-Hossein Mousavi, Ahmadinejad reiterated that his country's decision to release the fifteen British sailors was made after having received a letter of apology from the former British prime minister. The following day, Fars News Agency published a copy of a letter claimed to be a British apology.

After the conference, the Britons met Ahmadinejad outside the presidential palace, where they reportedly showed their appreciation for their release. Later Tony Blair said he was glad and stated that he "bears Iranian peoples no ill will." They were released on 5 April 2007. Whilst in Iran one of the sailors stated that when interviewed by British media at home, he would say nothing different than comments he has made in Iran about being well treated by the authorities. "I would not say anything different to here and I will be completely truthful. I will definitely promote Iran actually; there is a lot of ignorance in the UK about Iran and the people".

The release was presented to suggest that it was an Easter "gift" to the British people. Ahmadinejad is thought to have acted in response to a letter from Pope Benedict XVI who appealed to Iran's Supreme Leader to free the personnel as a "goodwill gesture before Easter". The letter was drawn up in consultation with the British Embassy to the Holy See. However, the captives were not released to British consular officials but placed directly aboard British Airways flight BA6634 (flown by franchisee British Mediterranean Airways using Airbus A321 G-MEDL), a direct flight to the UK, on the morning of 5 April 2007, landing at about noon local time. They were given gifts of CDs, Persian candies, pistachio nuts, books, vases and handicrafts by the Iranians. After a briefing on board at London Heathrow, the press were allowed a short photographic opportunity, before the personnel were flown directly to Royal Marines Base Chivenor in north Devon by two Royal Navy Westland Sea King helicopters for medical checkups, a full debriefing and meeting with their families.

=== Debriefing ===
At a news conference on the afternoon of Friday 6 April 2007 some of the British personnel said of their capture that some of the Iranian sailors had become "deliberately aggressive and unstable", rammed their boats and pointed their machine guns at them. The British said they did not resist because they believed they could not win in a fight and that it would have caused "major strategic" consequences. Upon their arrival at an Iranian naval base, the British said they were "blindfolded, stripped of all our kit" and then moved to another room where they were "...subjected to random interrogation. The questions were aggressive and the handling rough, but it was no worse than that". The next morning they were flown to Tehran and taken to a prison. Here, the British sailors said "the atmosphere changed completely".

According to the captives they were "blindfolded, their hands bound, and they were forced up against the wall". they said they faced "constant psychological pressure". Later, the British said they had been stripped and dressed in pyjamas. Over the next few nights they said they slept in "stone cells approximately 8 ft (2.4 m) by 6 ft (1.8 m), sleeping on piles of blankets" and kept in "isolation" and "interrogated" most nights. They said they were given two options: to admit they were in Iranian waters and be returned to the UK or face up to "seven years in prison". They claimed to have been "inside internationally-recognised Iraqi territorial waters" some "1.7 nautical miles" from Iranian waters.

They further stated that Faye Turney was at first kept separate from the men and for four days was deceived into believing that the men had been released.

Admiral Jonathon Band said, "I would not agree at all that it was not our finest hour. I think our people have reacted extremely well in some very difficult circumstances." It was also stated during the conference that although all British armed forces personnel receive training in what to do in the event of being captured, only that for pilots and special forces personnel specifically included training in hostage scenarios, and that there was no equivalent of the US "Code of the U.S. Fighting Force".

=== Iranian response ===
The Iranian reaction to 6 April press conference was to dismiss the entire thing as propaganda and to claim that the former captives had been dictated to by the British authorities into defaming Iran to hide the embarrassment of having violated Iranian waters. The handling of the captives return from captivity, i.e. the helicopter trip away from the media at Heathrow, the overnight delay in holding the press conference and the fact that not all the captives were available at the press conference, has been used by the Iranians to sow doubt as to the veracity of the captives' account of the affair.

Theatrical propaganda cannot conceal the mistake made by British military on violation of Iran's territorial waters and their repeated illegal entry into the country. Immediate transfer of the marines to a military base, dictated instructions and coordination between the British and US media on simultaneous release of a purposeful press conference cannot damage the existing evidence and documents on violation of Iran's territories by the British military.

— Mohammad Ali Hosseini, spokesman, Iranian Ministry of Foreign Affairs,

=== Publishing their stories ===
On 8 April, the Ministry of Defence announced that the detainees would, exceptionally, be permitted to sell their stories. It was subsequently revealed that the Second Sea Lord, Vice Admiral Adrian Johns made the decision to grant the marines and sailors permission to tell their stories. This decision has sparked anger and unease within the United Kingdom, with opposition MPs, such as Sir Menzies Campbell, expressing their concern. It was believed that Faye Turney sold her story for over £100,000.

On 9 April, the Ministry of Defence decided to ban personnel from selling their stories to the media until a review of the rules governing the issue is completed. Defence Secretary Des Browne said the review was aimed at making rules consistent across the armed forces. His announcement will not affect any of the fifteen service members who already have talked to media, a Defence Ministry spokesman said.

Tony Blair commented on 11 April that he was not made aware of the decision to allow the personnel to sell their stories until after the decision had been taken, and that "with hindsight" it was not a good idea, although he believed the move was made "completely in good faith". Following further pressure on the Government, Prime Minister Tony Blair insisted there would be no "witch hunt" for culprits.

== Release of kidnapped Iranian diplomat ==
It remains unclear whether the release of the fifteen British naval personnel had any coincidence with the release of a senior Iranian diplomat, Jalal Sharafi, who was taken hostage during a kidnapping in 2007. He was released on Tuesday, 3 April 2007, and walked back into the Iranian embassy in Baghdad, although it is not clear who had abducted him. He was taken captive by a group of men dressed in uniforms of the Iraqi 36th Commando Battalion – a special Iraqi unit under US direction. After his release, Sharafi claimed he had been kidnapped and tortured by American troops and agents of an Iraqi organisation acting under the supervision of the US Central Intelligence Agency. Signs of torture were reportedly found on Sharafi's body for which he received medical treatment. Iran also allegedly now had access to five Iranian nationals arrested in the US raid on Iranian liaison office in Arbil. An International Committee of the Red Cross team also visited the Iranian detainees. The British government however repeatedly stated that it made no deals with the United States or with Iran to secure the release of the detainees, and the timing of these events may be purely coincidental.

== Historical context ==
On 21 June 2004, eight British servicemen were detained for three days, after Iran said they had entered Iranian territorial waters in somewhat similar circumstances. They were released unharmed after the British and Iranian governments agreed there had been a misunderstanding. Their equipment was not returned and a rigid inflatable boat (RIB) was put on display in a museum in Tehran. During their detention, according to former detainee Marine Scott Fallon, he believed that they had endured a mock execution in which they were marched into the desert and made to stand blindfolded in front of a ditch while he heard their captors cock their weapons. They also appeared blindfolded on Iranian TV, where they were forced to apologise for their "mistake". There were, however, some differences between these two events. In 2004 the Royal Navy boats were operating much closer to the northern coast of the Persian Gulf in the mouth of the Shatt al Arab waterway which divides southern Iran and Iraq. The weather was bad causing negligible visibility which may have contributed to a potential crossing of the Iranian border by the Royal Navy. After the crew were returned and events analysed the British government affirmed its belief that the personnel were actually still in Iraqi waters, however they consigned the incident to a misunderstanding and requested the return of the equipment. In the 2007 incident the boats were by contrast operating some distance from the Iraqi-Iranian mainland in open water and were (according to the British) 1.7 nautical miles inside Iraqi territory. Visibility conditions were good and the crew had GPS navigational equipment (installed in part due to the 2004 incident).

An Iranian government-run media source, the IRNA, alleges violations of Iranian territory by British armed forces to have occurred several times in recent years.

- On 27 January 2007 a British helicopter flew over the mouth of the Shatt al-Arab and violated Iran's airspace. It allegedly left the area after a warning from Iranian coast guard forces. No information about this is available from either the British government or independent media to confirm or deny the accuracy of this account.
- On 28 February 2007, three Royal Navy boats allegedly entered the mouth of the Khor Mousa in Iranian territorial waters. No British government or independent media sources have confirmed or denied the accuracy of this account.

A MoD inquiry report later stated that tactical commanders on HMS Cornwall and in the area were not well aware of this historical context and "did not know how much they did not know", in part because of a lack of continuity in staffing.

=== Official inquiries ===
19 June 2007 saw the release of information about two official reports, the confidential Fulton report into the military aspects of the April incident, and the published report by Tony Hall into the media aftermath. The reports concluded that although there were "failings" and a "collective failure of judgment" that these "were not the result of a single gross failing or individual human error".

On 22 July 2007 the House of Commons Foreign Affairs Select Committee released a report into the incident, however Fulton's Navy report had not been released to the parliamentary committee.

In April 2008 redacted documents from the initial MoD inquiry for Chief of the Defence Staff Air Chief Marshal Sir Jock Stirrup were released to The Times under Freedom of Information laws. The Times stated that the British sailors captured by Iran were "in internationally disputed waters and not in Iraq's maritime territory as Parliament was told", that the US-led coalition had drawn a boundary line between Iran and Iraq without informing the Iranians, that Iranian coastal protection vessels regularly crossed this coalition defined boundary, and that the British were first to raise their weapons in the incident before the Iranian gunboats came alongside.

=== Incident with Royal Australian Navy ===
Following the incident, the BBC reported that a similar incident had occurred in December 2004, this time with a boarding party of Royal Australian Navy (RAN) personnel from the frigate HMAS Adelaide. The sailors had boarded the freighter MV Sham from two RHIBs, which had grounded near the maritime border between Iraq and Iran. As they were leaving, the vessels were approached by an Iranian gunboat. The boarding party climbed back aboard Sham, took up defensive positions, and, according to BBC reporter Frank Gardner, "warned [the Iranians] to back off, using what was said to be 'highly colourful language'." During the next 45 minutes four more gunboats arrived, and the stand-off lasted for four hours before the Australians were evacuated by Adelaide's Seahawk helicopter. No shots were fired during the incident, and two of the Australians were later awarded the Distinguished Service Medal for their conduct during the stand-off. The Australian Defence Force did not report the incident to the media at the time, stating that at the time, there was no need to highlight it.

== See also ==
- 2004 Iranian seizure of Royal Navy personnel
- 2016 U.S.–Iran naval incident
- Iran hostage crisis (1979)
- Iran–Iraq border
- Iran–United Kingdom relations
- Iran's 2018 prisoner swap proposal to the United States
