= The Decline of Civilization =

Understanding the major shift of historical Indian civilization

The Decline of Civilization: Why We Need To Return To Gandhi And Tagore
- First edition
- Author: Ramin Jahanbegloo
- Language: English
- Subject: Philosophy
- Publisher: Aleph Book Company
- Publication date: 2017
- Media type: Print (hardcover)
- Pages: 174
- ISBN: 9789386021519

The Decline of Civilization: Why We Need To Return To Gandhi And Tagore is a 2017 book by Ramin Jahanbegloo with a foreword by Romila Thapar in which the author provides a political and philosophical investigation of the idea of civilization and asks whether our age is lacking a civilizational resource.

== Reception ==
The book was reviewed in The Financial Express, Lacuna and Mainstream Weekly.

== See also ==
- The Decline of the West
