= Kidnapping of Jalal Sharafi =

2007 kidnapping of Iranian diplomat

Jalal Sharafi
- Born: Iran
- Known for: Kidnapping and later allegations of CIA torture

Gunmen kidnapped Jalal Sharafi (Persian: جلال شرفی), the second secretary of the Iranian embassy, as he drove through Karrada district in central Baghdad, Iraq on 6 February 2007. The gunmen wore uniforms of the Iraqi 36th Commando Battalion, a special Iraqi unit under United States direction. The U.S. military denied any involvement in the kidnapping. After his release on 3 April 2007, the diplomat claimed he was tortured by Central Intelligence Agency (CIA) operatives. The U.S. government denies that they had involvement in the kidnapping and alleged torture of Sharafi.

== Background ==
The event happened amid U.S.–Iranian tension over alleged Iranian activities in Iraq. In December 2006, U.S. forces detained several Iranians in Iraq who were suspected by the Americans of planning attacks. Iran said two were diplomats, and they were later freed. On 10 January 2007, U.S. President George W. Bush stated in a major speech that he will take a tough stance on Iran, whom he accuses of destabilising Iraq. On 11 January 2007, U.S. troops raided the Iranian Liaison Office in Erbil, arresting five men. On 18 January 2007, Iran demanded the release of the five Iranians claimed as diplomats. The U.S. government says they are Revolutionary Guardsmen arming Shia Iraqi fighters.

== Response ==
=== Iran ===
Foreign Ministry Spokesman Mohammad Ali Hosseini said, "elements related to the Iraqi defence ministry who are known to be under U.S. control" were responsible for the kidnapping and the U.S. government has "violated all international and diplomatic norms by launching such operations which will in general have negative impacts on diplomatic norms around the world".

Iran said it held the United States responsible for the diplomats "safety and life". Iran harshly condemned the kidnapping of an Iranian diplomat as a "terrorist act".

=== France ===
The French Ministry of Foreign Affairs said in a statement, "We learned with concern about the kidnapping of a member of the Iranian embassy in Baghdad. We condemn this unacceptable act."

== Release ==
On 3 April 2007, almost two months after Sharafi was taken, Iranian news agencies reported his release. This has been linked with the simultaneous release by Iran of the 15 British sailors who had been arrested for allegedly entering Iranian territorial waters.

After his release, Sharafi reported severe torture, stating he was "subjected to different forms of torture day and night" while being kept in a CIA base, in order for him to confess to "Iran's presence and influence in Iraq". He stated: "I explained I was unable to do anything outside my legal responsibilities [...] Later, they released me under pressure from Iraqi government officials. They dropped me near the back of the airport." The U.S. government responded by claiming that "the CIA does not conduct or condone torture". One day after Sharafi was released, the 15 sailors captured by Iran during the 2007 Iranian arrest of Royal Navy personnel were released, leading to speculation that there was a connection in the events, though all governments officially deny this.

=== Press conference ===
On 11 April 2007, a clearly thin Sharafi, while in a wheelchair and receiving intravenous fluids, attended a press conference with the help of doctors. Sharafi stated that the representative of the Embassy of the United States, who was in charge "[f]irst had a peaceful message but then when I did not answer his baseless accusations he and the Iraqi translator started beating me. [...] Then they brought on a machine to drill holes into my feet. They tied my feet and hands and lashed my soles hundreds of times with cables and kicked and punched me [...] They performed mock executions while my eyes were blindfolded and my hands and feet were bound." The U.S. government insisted they did not have any involvement in this incident and does not condone torture. The International Committee of the Red Cross, who examined Sharafi, confirmed the wounds were caused in the recent past, but refused to conclude that it was as a result of torture during his detainment.

== See also ==
- United States kill or capture strategy in Iraq
