= Association Reset-Dialogues on Civilizations =

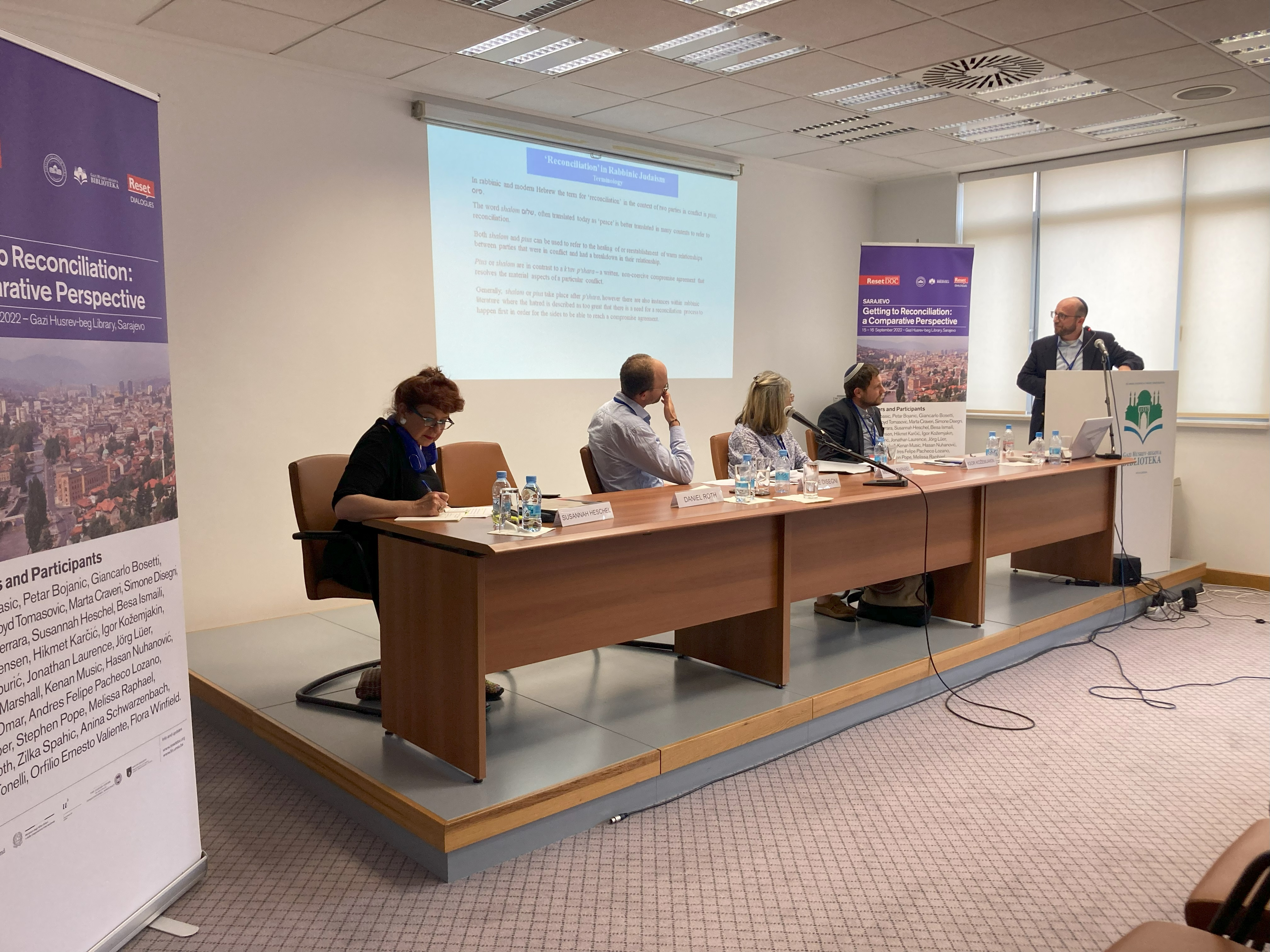

Reset Dialogues on Civilizations (often referred to as ResetDOC) is an independent, non-profit, and non-partisan international association founded in 2004 by Italian journalist Giancarlo Bosetti and Nina zu Fürstenberg. It is committed to fostering research and publications on cross-cultural and international relations, cultural and religious pluralism, advancements of human rights, and the evolution of democracy in different civilizational environments.

== History and background ==
ResetDOC was founded in 2004, during the global debate over the ‘clash of civilizations,’ by a group of scholars with different cultural and religious backgrounds. The association's primary mission is to promote knowledge and understanding among different cultures through research, seminars, and publications in social science and humanities. It was originally founded in cooperation with the Italian bi-monthly political-cultural magazine Reset, of which Giancarlo Bosetti serves as the editor-in-chief. Although Reset magazine is no longer in print, it still operates as a free Italian language webzine. The association has since grown into an international platform for intercultural dialogue, with publications in English, Italian, and other languages. In 2009, ResetDOC founded a separate US-based non-profit, Reset Dialogues (US). Each entity is governed by its own board, overseeing distinct program areas, but they share a single advisory council and global mission. Working together, ResetDOC and Reset Dialogues engage in programmatic cooperation to promote multi-year projects of varying geographical and cultural scope. The European office, ResetDOC, based in Milan, oversees the web magazine and other publications, the annual Venice Seminars, all other European events, and partnerships, as well as religious pluralism programs. The American office, Reset Dialogues (US), under the leadership of Jonathan Laurence (Executive Director) and Craig Calhoun (President), manages US-based and Transatlantic partnerships and the North African Seminars on Pluralism.

== Activities and initiatives ==
Reset Dialogues on Civilizations pursues its mission by engaging in various activities and initiatives:

- International Conferences: In March 2006, ResetDOC opened its first year of activities with an international conference titled "Beyond Orientalism and Occidentalism" held in Cairo. In subsequent years, the association founded the Istanbul Seminars, which brought together globally renowned academics from both East and West. In 2017 the Istanbul Seminars moved to Venice and were held in cooperation with Ca’ Foscari University, due to the worsening political climate in Turkey. Over the years ResetDOC has held conferences in India, the United States, Italy, Ireland, Morocco, and Tunisia.

- Online Magazine: ResetDOC publishes an online magazine, resetdoc.org, specializing in issues related to cross-cultural relations and dialogue. The journal features essays, analyses, conference proceedings, video interviews, and contributions from top international thinkers. Some of resetdoc.org's contents are also translated into Italian and published on the website reset.it.

- The Intercultural Lexicon: is an ongoing multi-year program seeking to examine key concepts that cause political and cultural rifts in a comparative, cross-cultural perspective. This initiative builds on Reset's existing and expanding network of scholars, bringing deep contextual knowledge to contemporary political analysis. Through the exploration of fundamental concepts, the program aims to shed light on how different cultures interpret and understand these terms, thereby promoting a more nuanced and comprehensive understanding of global challenges.

- Theologies and Practices of Religious Pluralism: The project investigates current debates and issues on pluralism within and across religious traditions and how some of these debates are reshaping the status of religion in different public spaces. These adaptations have a profound impact on international relations and daily life in every society, across cultural, ethnic, racial divides.

== Publications ==
The fruits of Reset's international conferences and seminars have been transformed into high-level scientific publications. These publications include its own series of monographs, collaborations with the journal Philosophy & Social Criticism, and other publishers:

- Volumes of selected essays (Springer Publishing)

- Special editions of Philosophy & Social Criticism dedicated to the Istanbul, Venice, and Dublin Seminars (2009-)

- ResetDOC Monographs (available in both hard copies and e-book formats)

=== Latest volumes ===
- J. Laurence (ed.), "Secularism in Comparative Perspective: Religions across Political Contexts" (Springer)

- F. Zoja (ed.), "Challenging Power in the Arab World" (ResetDOC Monographs)

- F. Zoja (ed.), "After the Revolution. A Decade of Tunisian and North African Politics" (ResetDOC Monographs)

- M. Hashas (ed.) "Pluralism in Islamic Contexts - Ethics, Politics and Modern Challenges" (Springer)

- M. Haddad, "Muslim Reformism-A Critical History: Is Islamic Religious Reform Possible?" (Springer)

- R. Cucciolla (ed.), "Dimensions and Challenges of Russian Liberalism" (Springer)

== Founding committee ==
- José Casanova (President)
- Seyla Benhabib (Former President until 2019)
- Giuliano Amato (Former President until 2013)
- Nasr Hamid Abu Zayd (1943-2010)
- Katajun Amirpur
- Abdullahi Ahmed An-Na’im
- Abdou Filali Ansari
- Giancarlo Bosetti
- Massimo Campanini (1954-2019)
- Fred Dallmayr
- Silvio Fagiolo (1938-2011)
- Maria Teresa Fumagalli Beonio Brocchieri
- Nina zu Fürstenberg
- Timothy Garton Ash
- Anthony Giddens
- Vartan Gregorian (1934-2021)
- Renzo Guolo
- Hassan Hanafi (1935-2021)
- Nader Hashemi
- Roman Herzog (1934-2017)
- Ramin Jahanbegloo
- Jörg Lau
- Amos Luzzatto (1928-2020)
- Avishai Margalit
- Krzysztof Michalski (1948-2013)
- Andrea Riccardi
- Olivier Roy
- Otto Georg Schily
- Karel Schwarzenberg
- Roberto Toscano
- Nadia Urbinati
- Umberto Veronesi (1925-2016)
- Michael Walzer
