= Ramin Jahanbegloo =

Iranian philosopher and academic

Ramin Jahanbegloo (Persian: رامین جهانبگلو, born 28 December 1956 in Tehran) is an Iranian philosopher and academic based in Toronto, Canada.

== Biography ==
Ramin Jahanbegloo was born in Tehran, Iran. He has a doctorate in philosophy from Sorbonne University in Paris, France, where he lived for twenty years. He was a post-doctorate fellow in Middle Eastern Studies at Harvard University. He is married to Azin Moalej and has a daughter named Afarin Jahanbegloo.

== Academic and intellectual career ==
Jahanbegloo's intellectual activity focuses on fostering constructive dialogue between divergent cultures. He has written numerous books and articles in Persian, English, and French on the subject of Western philosophy and modernity. In 1991 he published his book Conversations with Isaiah Berlin in French, which was translated into English and published the following year. The book records a series of interviews with the famous philosopher Isaiah Berlin, which cover intellectual questions ranging from the moral philosophy of Tolstoy to the meaning of liberalism. Between 1997 and 2001, he was an adjunct professor of Political Science at the University of Toronto in Canada.

In 2001, he served at the National Endowment for Democracy as a fellow at the federally funded program known as the Reagan-Fascell Democracy Fellows Program

Upon returning to Tehran, he was appointed head of the Contemporary Philosophy Department of the Cultural Research Center. In his efforts to promote dialogue, he has interviewed scholars and intellectuals from all over the world, among them George Steiner, Noam Chomsky, Ashis Nandy and the Dalai Lama. In recent years, he invited Richard Rorty, Timothy Garton Ash, Antonio Negri, and Michael Ignatieff and other Western intellectuals to Iran.

== Political detention ==
In late April 2006, on his way to an international conference in Brussels, Jahanbegloo was arrested by the Iranian authorities.

On May 3, Iran judiciary branch officials confirmed that he was arrested and sent to Evin Prison. Some sources say he was accused of spying. The following day, a friend told CBC News that Jahanbegloo had been moved to a hospital.Human Rights Watch expressed concern over Jahanbegloo being detained without charges and called for his immediate release.

According to Canadian newspaper reports on May 6, Jahanbegloo's friends suspected he was being tortured. Their fears increased in the wake of reports that Jahanbegloo had been examined twice at the medical clinic of Evin Prison, a detention facility for political prisoners.

An Iranian newspaper, Jomhuri Eslami, accused Jahanbegloo of links to the U.S. Central Intelligence Agency and the Mossad. "He is considered as one of the key elements in the American plan for the smooth toppling" of the Islamic regime", the newspaper stated, further charging that the United States was paying him to conduct "cultural activities against Iran."

On May 13, the Defenders of Human Rights Center (DHRC), an Iranian human rights group headed by Iran's Nobel Peace Prize laureate Shirin Ebadi, voiced concern over the arrest and jailing of the prominent intellectual.

On May 15, the Council of the European Union, following a meeting in Brussels, issued a press release expressing concerns about the detention of Jahanbegloo, including its underlying message that Iranians ought not to communicate or associate with Europeans:

"The Council is seriously concerned about the detention of the Iranian philosopher Dr. Ramin Jahanbegloo. The Council calls upon Iranian authorities not to penalize Iranian citizens for their contacts with Europeans, including embassies, universities and cultural institutes".

On May 19, more than 400 prominent international figures, including Nobel laureates, scholars, and human rights activists, demanded Jahanbegloo's immediate release in an open letter. Among the undersigned are Noam Chomsky, J. M. Coetzee, Shirin Ebadi, Umberto Eco, Jürgen Habermas, Timothy Garton Ash, Leszek Kołakowski, Antonio Negri, Richard Rorty, Krzysztof Zanussi, and Howard Zinn.

On June 13, Reuters reported from Tehran that Jahanbegloo was barred from seeing a lawyer during his interrogations.

On July 10, the Council of the European Union issued another press release reiterating its concerns about the detention of Jahanbegloo:

"The EU is particularly alarmed about the continuing detention of the respected Iranian academic Dr. Ramin Jahanbegloo, who is well known for his commitment to philosophical and moral principles, non-violence and dialogue."

On August 30, 2006, Jahanbegloo was released after four months of confinement. His 2014 book Time Will Say Nothing: A Philosopher Survives an Iranian Prison included a narrative of his imprisonment and interrogation.

On June 29, 2009, commenting on post-election chaos, Iranian minister of intelligence said, "there is no practical possibility of a velvet revolution in Iran" though he accused United States and Britain of trying to orchestrate one. He disclosed that people such as Ramin Jahanbaglou and Haleh Esfandiari had been arrested in connection with such foreign assisted plots to instigate the Iranian intelligentia but due to legal complications, no prosecution could take place.

== Career after imprisonment ==
In 2006 and 2007 he was Professor of Democracy at the Centre for the Study of Developing Societies in New Delhi, India. In January 2008 he returned to the University of Toronto as a professor of Political Science, Massey College Scholar-at-Risk, and Research Fellow at the Centre for Ethics at Trinity College. In 2009, he wrote a book, Talking Architecture: Raj Rewal In Conversation With Ramin Jahanbegloo. The book was inaugurated on 19 December 2009 in New Delhi, India. He also taught a series of nine online Persian-language lectures on nonviolence and nonviolent resistance for Tavaana: E-Learning Institute for Iranian Civil Society. He currently works in O.P Jindal Global University, India as a Vice Dean and the head of the Center for Mahatma Gandhi Studies.

Inspired by Czechoslovakia's renowned Charter 77, Ramin Jahanbegloo along with a group of Iranian intellectuals (Mehrdad Loghmani, Ali Ehsasi, Mehrdad Ariannejad, Mehrdad Hariri) penned Charter91, منشور ۹۱, a document that aimed to unite the Iranian people around a common human rights and civic agenda.

== Awards ==
In October 2009, Jahanbegloo became the winner of the Peace Prize from the United Nations Association in Spain for his extensive academic works in promoting dialogue between cultures and his advocacy for non-violence.

== Works ==
- Conversations with Isaiah Berlin (Peter Halban, 1992)
- Gandhi: Aux Sources de la Nonviolence ( Felin, 1999)
- Penser la Nonviolence (UNESCO, 2000)
- Iran: Between Tradition and Modernity (Lexington Books, 2004)
- India Revisited (Oxford University Press, 2007)
- The Clash of Intolerances (Har-Anand 2007)
- The Spirit of India (Penguin 2008)
- Beyond Violence (Har-Anand 2008), Leggere Gandhi a Teheran (Marsilio 2008)
- Talking Politics (Oxford University Press 2010)
- Civil Society and Democracy in Iran (Lexington Press, 2011)
- Democracy in Iran (Palgrave 2013)
- The Gandhian Moment (Harvard University Press 2013)
- Introduction to Nonviolence (Palgrave 2013)
- Time Will Say Nothing (University of Regina Press 2014)
- Talking Philosophy (Oxford University Press 2015)
- The Decline of Civilization (Aleph Books 2017)
- On Forgiveness and Revenge (University of Regina Press 2017)
- Harmony and Exchange Toward a Legoic Society (Peter Lang 2017)
- The Disobedient Indian: Gandhi's Philosophy of Resistance ( Speaking Tiger 2018)
- The Global Gandhi (Routledge 2018)
- The Revolution of Values: The Moral and Political Philosophy of Martin Luther King, Jr. (Lexington Press 2018)
- Albert Camus: The Unheroic Hero of Our Time (Routledge 2020)
- The Courage to Exist: A Philosophy of Life and Death in the Age of Coronavirus (Orient Black Swan 2020)
- Pedagogy of Dissent (Orient Black Swan 2020)
- In Pursuit of Unhappiness (Orient Black Swan 2020)
- Conversations with Ko Un (Orient Black Swan 2021)
- Nonviolent Resistance as a Philosophy of Life (Bloomsbury 2021)
- Gandhi and Nonviolent Peace (Routledge 2021)
- Nonviolent Resistance as a Philosophy of Life (Bloomsbury, 2021)
- Comparative Approaches to Compassion, Introduction to Nonviolence (Bloomsbury, 2022)

== See also ==
- Iranian philosophy
- Intellectual Movements in Iran
- History of fundamentalist Islam in Iran
- List of foreign nationals detained in Iran
- Daryoush Ashouri
- Zahra Kazemi
- Haleh Esfandiari
- Hossein Nasr
- Isaiah Berlin
- Association Reset-Dialogues on Civilizations
