= Andrei Sakharov Prize (APS) =

Biennial human rights award

The Andrei Sakharov Prize is a prize that is to be awarded every two years by the American Physical Society since 2006. The recipients are chosen for "outstanding leadership and/or achievements of scientists in upholding human rights." It is named after Andrei Sakharov (1921-1989), a Soviet nuclear physicist, dissident, and human rights activist. Since 2007, it has been valued at $10,000. The first Sakharov Prize was awarded to physicist and former Soviet gulag prisoner Yuri Orlov.

== Recipients ==
- 2006 Yuri Orlov (Cornell University)
- 2008 Liangying Xu (Chinese Academy of Sciences)
- 2010 Herman Winick (Stanford Linear Accelerator Center), Joseph Birman (City University of New York), and Morris (Moishe) Pripstein (National Science Foundation)
- 2012 Mulugeta Bekele (University of Addis Ababa) and Richard Wilson (Harvard University)
- 2014 Boris Altshuler (P.N. Lebedev Physical Institute) and Omid Kokabee (University of Texas at Austin)
- 2016 Zafra M. Lerman (Malta Conferences Foundation)
- 2018 Narges Mohammadi (Iran Engineering Inspection Corporation) and Ravi Kuchimanchi (Association for India's Development)
- 2020 Ayşe Erzan (Istanbul Technical University) and Xiaoxing Xi (Temple University)
- 2022 John C. Polanyi (University of Toronto)
- 2024 Eugene Chudnovsky (City University of New York)

== See also ==
- List of American Physical Society prizes and awards
- List of physics awards
