= Mousa Chegini =

Iranian diplomat and politician

Mousa Chegini (Persian: موسی چگینی) is an Iranian diplomat and politician.

Chegini was among the Iranian officials captured by American militants in the US raid on the Iranian consular office in Arbil. He was released after 305 days on November 9, 2007.

"The release followed a careful review of individual records to determine if they posed a security threat to Iraq" the American officials said in a statement. The United States formerly accused Mousa Chegini and several other Iranian diplomats of being behind terrorist activity in Iraq.
