= Mulugeta Bekele =

Ethiopian scientist and academic

- ሙሉጌታ በቀለ
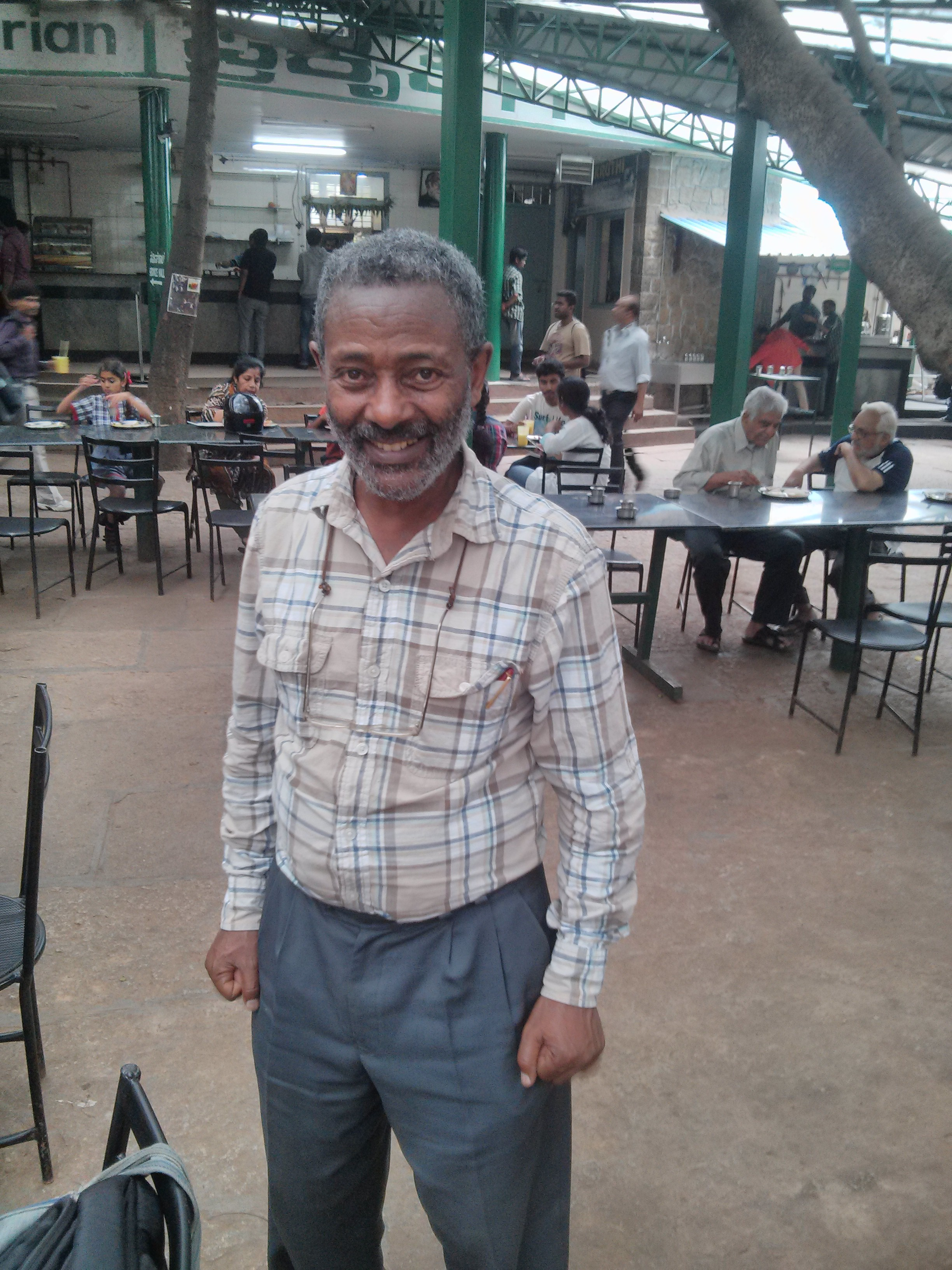
- Prof. Mulugeta Bekele at Prakriti Canteen at Indian Institute of Science, Bangalore, India on 30 August 2014
- Born: Mulugeta Bekele; 2 January 1947 (age 79); Arsi, Ethiopia
- Occupation: Physicist

Mulugeta Bekele (Amharic: ሙሉጌታ በቀለ; born 2 January 1947) is an Ethiopian scientist and academic. He is an associate Professor of Physics at Addis Ababa University (AAU), Ethiopia. He completed his PhD in Physics at the Indian Institute of Science, Bangalore, India in 1997. He has been awarded the Andrei Sakharov Prize by the American Physical Society (APS) "For tireless efforts in defense of human rights and freedom of expression and education anywhere in the world, and for inspiring students, colleagues and others to do the same." He is the president of Ethiopian Physical Society since October 1998 and an Associate Member of the Abdus Salam International Centre for Theoretical Physics, Trieste, Italy since May 1999.

== Life and career ==
Mulugeta was born in Arsi, Ethiopia in 1947. In 1970, he graduated with a B.Sc. in physics from Haile Selassie I University (now Addis Ababa University). As the only physics student in his senior year, he was given the opportunity to attend Union College in Schenectady to complete his final year of class work. In 1972, he joined the physics department at Addis Ababa University as a graduate student. He then went on to pursue a M.Sc. in physics at the University of Maryland, College Park in 1973. He then returned home to Ethiopia as a lecturer in the Department of Physics at Addis Ababa University.

Mulugeta participated in democracy-seeking rebel movements during the time of the Ethiopian monarchy's ouster by the Derg military junta. For his part in organizing demonstrations, he was imprisoned by the Mengistu regime; at first for nine months in 1978, and then for the six years from 1979 to 1985.

After Mulugeta's release from prison in 1987 at the age of 39, he returned to AAU to teach. In 1991, he joined the Indian Institute of Science at Bangalore, India and completed his Ph.D. degree in Physics. In 1998, he earned the position of a Senior Associate Membership of ICTP for six years.

A prominent figure on the AAU campus, Mulugeta is also one of the founding members of the Ethiopian Physical Society. He served for four years as the organization's president.

== Achievements and contributions ==
Mulugeta's research is internationally supported by the International Science Programme (ISP) at Uppsala University, Sweden, and the International Center for Theoretical Physics (ICTP) at Trieste, Italy. For his tireless efforts in defense of human rights and freedom of expression and education anywhere in the world, and for inspiring students, colleagues and others to do the same, he was awarded the Andrei Sakharov Prize, which was presented at the APS March 2012 meeting in Boston, MA, 27 February – 2 March 2012, at a special Ceremonial session.
