= United States kill or capture strategy in Iraq =

The "kill or capture" strategy is a policy adopted in 2007 by the United States in Iraq to confront suspected Iranian operatives in Iraq. These Iranian operatives were accused of supplying various militias in Iraq with technical, financial, and material support so that they can carry out terrorist attacks against U.S.-led Coalition forces.

== Announcement ==
In January 2007 the Bush administration authorized the U.S. military to kill or capture any member of Iran's Islamic Revolutionary Guard Corps (IRGC), as well as its intelligence operatives inside Iraq as part of a strategy to diminish Iran's influence in Iraq and compel the government to end its nuclear program. Task Force 17 was created with the mission to defeat IRGC-QF, their proxies and surrogate networks in Iraq in order to disrupt malign Iranian influence.

== Background ==
This new policy replaced the previous "catch and release" policy which had been in place for more than a year. Under that policy, U.S. forces would secretly detain suspected Iranian agents, holding them for a few days. The policy was intended to intimidate Iranian emissaries without excessively escalating tensions with Iran. U.S. forces took DNA samples or retina scans of the detainees, along with fingerprints and photographs, before letting them go.

Senior administration officials said the new policy was based on the theory that Iran would back down from its nuclear ambitions if the United States hit it hard in Iraq and elsewhere, creating a sense of vulnerability among Iranian leaders. Officials also clarified that the policy does not extend to Iranian civilians or diplomats.

== Reactions ==
The head of the Iranian parliament's Foreign Policy and Security Commission said he hoped the report was "wrong, as such an order is a clear terrorist act and against all internationally acknowledged norms." The Iranian Foreign Minister Manouchehr Mottaki blamed U.S. President Bush for the order, saying in a press conference, that "as far as Iraq is concerned, Iran is not a problem but part of solving it. The U.S. should not blame others for the failure of its policies and always look for scapegoats."

Syria's Foreign Minister Walid Muallem stated that Iran and Syria's shared borders with Iraq meant they benefitted most from a secure and stable Iraq, and stressed their constructive role. He described Coalition forces as intruders in Iraq's domestic affairs, and viewed the U.S.' new strategy as wrong.

Iranian President Mahmoud Ahmadinejad defended the U.S.-backed Iraqi government and warned against attempts to undermine it, declaring during a call with Iraqi President Jalal Talabani in January 2007 that any attempt to weaken the Iraqi government would be "treason against the Iraqi people and Islamic nation".

On January 20, 2007, Mohammad Ali Jafari, then-commander-in-chief of the Iranian Revolutionary Guard Corps, declared that "The United States seeks to justify its failure in Iraq and blame the situation on Iran."

In June 2007 the NSA's Director Mike McConnell stated there was "overwhelming evidence" that Iran supported terrorists in Iraq and "compelling evidence" that it did much the same in Afghanistan.

Iraqi President Jalal Talabani said that Iranian-born Ayatollah Ali Sistani had played an important role in helping to establish security in Iraq. President Talabani also mentioned that Iran and Syria had begun to help the Iraqi government in a good manner. "We do not want the Iranian-U.S. relations to develop into a conflict in Iraq. On the contrary, we have exerted efforts to bring about a U.S.-Iranian agreement or understanding for a joint action for the security and stability in Iraq." he said in an interview with Al-Hayat in January 2007.

Following two U.S. raids in December 2006 and January 2007 in which Iranian nationals were detained, one of Iraq's most powerful Shia politicians, Abdel Aziz al-Hakim, condemned the arrest as an attack on Iraq's sovereignty.

During an interview in January 2007, Germany's Deputy Foreign Minister Gernot Erler said there will be no solution to the Iraqi conflict unless Iran and Syria are also involved in the efforts to restore peace.

Officials counseled the U.S. President and his direct advisers to consider all potential consequences, including the possibility that the Iranian government may retaliate by increasing its efforts to hinder, detain, or kill U.S. forces in Iraq.

== See also ==
- Iraqi insurgency (2003–2011)
- Iraq War troop surge of 2007
- U.S. raid on Iranian consular office in Erbil
- 2007 Iranian seizure of Royal Navy personnel
- Task Force 6-26
- Assassination of Qasem Soleimani
- U.S. list of most-wanted Iraqis
- Joint Special Operations Command Task Force in the Iraq War
- Karbala provincial headquarters raid
- List of assassinations by the United States
- Assassination and targeted killing by the CIA
- CIA activities in Iraq
