= Shaul Bakhash =

Iranian-American academic

Shaul Bakhash (Persian: شائول بخاش) is an Iranian-American historian and emeritus from George Mason University.

He received his BA and MA from Harvard University and his DPhil from the University of Oxford. Before beginning his academic career, Bakhash was a journalist in Iran, where he wrote for the newspaper Kayhan.

In 2003, Bakhash was a visiting fellow at the think tank Brookings Institution with a focus on "the prospects for internal reform in Iran".
