= Ghadir Habseh =

Ghadir Habseh غديرحبسه
- Village
- Location within Iran
- Coordinates: 31°04′12″N 48°59′01″E
- Country: Iran
- Province: Khuzestan
- County: Ahvaz
- Bakhsh: Central
- Rural District: Mosharrahat

Population (2006)
  - Total: 146
- Time zone: UTC+3:30 (IRST)
  - Summer (DST): UTC+4:30 (IRDT)

Ghadir Habseh (Persian: غديرحبسه, also Romanized as Ghadīr Ḩabseh and Ghadīr-e Ḩabseh; also known as Ghadīr Ḩabeh, Ḩasbeh, and Qadīr-e Ḩabseh) is a village in Mosharrahat Rural District, in the Central District of Ahvaz County, Khuzestan Province, Iran. At the 2006 census, its population was 146, in 30 families.
