= Eugene Chudnovsky =

Eugene M. Chudnovsky
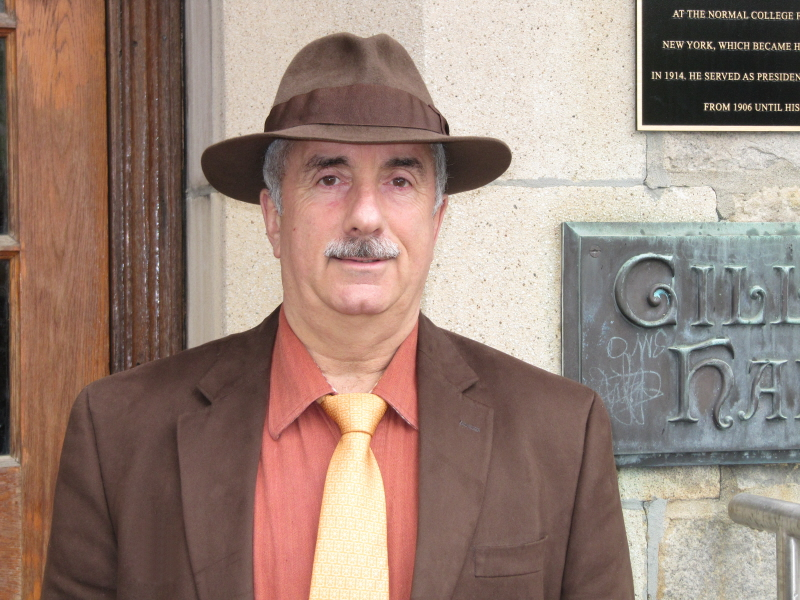
- Eugene Chudnovsky at the Gillet Hall of Lehman College
- Born: December 12, 1948 (age 77); Leningrad
- Education: Kharkiv University
- Occupation: Professor of Physics
- Organization: Lehman College
- Title: Distinguished Professor of Physics
- Spouse: Marina Chudnovsky
- Website: lehman.edu/academics/natural-social-sciences/physics-astronomy/Eugene-M-Chudnovsky/

Eugene Michael Chudnovsky (born 12 December 1948) is a Distinguished Professor of Physics at Lehman College and a member of the doctoral faculty at the Graduate Center of the City University of New York. Chudnovsky is a Fellow of the American Physical Society (APS), elected 1993 for "seminal contributions to random ferromagnetism, macroscopic quantum tunneling, and hexatic order in high Tc materials". He is mostly known for his work on quantum tunneling of magnetization. Chudnovsky explained magnetic avalanches experimentally observed in molecular magnets as deflagration.

Chudnovsky received his undergraduate, graduate, and postdoctoral education at Kharkiv University in Ukraine, in the school of theoretical physics founded by Lev Landau and his students. The denial by the USSR of an exit visa to Chudnovsky in 1979 led to his unemployment for eight years, during which he continued independent research in theoretical physics and participated in the unofficial Refusenik Science Seminar in Moscow. He was frequently harassed and interrogated by the KGB.

In 1987 Chudnovsky was allowed to emigrate and joined the faculty of the physics department of Tufts University in Boston. The following year he moved to the City University of New York (CUNY). He has held visiting positions at research centers in the US, Asia, and Europe—most notably at the University of Barcelona - Spain, where he co-organizes Annual International Workshop on Magnetism and Superconductivity.

Chudnovsky has been active in the field of human rights. He has served as chair of the APS Committee on International Freedom of Scientists, Member-at-Large of the Forum on International Physics, Chair of the Committee on Human Rights of Scientists of the New York Academy of Sciences, and co-chair of the Committee of Concerned Scientists. In 1990s he directed Program for Refugee Scientists that resettled over one hundred refugee scientists in the United States.

Chudnovsky is a recipient of the 2024 Andrei Sakharov Prize (APS) of the American Physical Society, awarded to him “for decades of leadership of prominent campaigns on behalf of oppressed scientists, including chairmanship of the APS and New York Academy of Sciences human rights committees and co-chairing of the Committee of Concerned Scientists.”

== Works ==
Selected papers

E. M. Chudnovsky, W. M. Saslow, and R. A. Serota, "Ordering in ferromagnets with random anisotropy", Physical Review B 33, 251 (1986).

E. M. Chudnovsky and L. Gunther, "Quantum tunneling of magnetization in small ferromagnetic particles", Physical Review Letters 60, 661 (1988)].

E. M. Chudnovsky, "Hexatic vortex glass in disordered superconductors", Physical Review B 40, 11355 (1989)].

E. M. Chudnovsky, "Phase transitions in the problem of the decay of a metastable state", Physical Review A 46, 8011 (1992)].

E. M. Chudnovsky, "Universal decoherence in solids", Physical Review Letters 92, 120405 (2004)].

Books

E. M. Chudnovsky and J. Tejada, "Macroscopic Quantum Tunneling of the Magnetic Moment", Cambridge University Press, 1998].

E. M. Chudnovsky and J. Tejada, "Lectures on Magnetism" (Rinton Press, Princeton, NJ – 2006)].

E. M. Chudnovsky, J. Tejada, and E. Punset (in Spanish): "El Templo de la Ciencia", Destino – Spain, 2008].

E. M. Chudnovsky and J. Tejada (in Spanish), "El Viaje de Cloe" (Destino – 2011)].
