= Haleh Esfandiari =

Iranian-American academic

- Born: March 3, 1940 (age 86)
- Citizenship: Iranian, American
- Spouse: Shaul Bakhash

Academic background
- Education: University of Vienna

Haleh Esfandiari (Persian: هاله اسفندیاری) (born March 3, 1940) is an Iranian-American academic and former Director of the Middle East Program at the Woodrow Wilson International Center for Scholars in Washington, D.C. Her areas of expertise include Middle Eastern women's issues, contemporary Iranian intellectual currents and politics, and democratic developments in the Middle East. She was detained in solitary confinement at Evin Prison in Tehran, Iran for more than 110 days from May 8 to August 21, 2007.

== Biography ==
Esfandiari was born and grew up in Iran. She has lived in the United States since 1980, having left Iran with her husband and daughter because of the 1979 Iranian Revolution. She holds dual U.S.-Iranian citizenship.

Esfandiari is married to Shaul Bakhash, a Jewish Iranian-American professor of history and Persian studies at George Mason University. She met Bakhash in the early 1960s, when both were reporters at the Iranian newspaper Kayhan. They have a daughter and two granddaughters.

== Career ==
Before Esfandiari left Iran, she had a career as a journalist and taught at the College of Mass Communication in Tehran. She was also Deputy Secretary General of the Women's Organization of Iran and she was responsible for several museums and art and cultural centers. She earned her Ph.D. at the University of Vienna.

In the United States, Esfandiari taught courses on Persian language, contemporary Persian literature and the women's movement in Iran at Princeton University from 1980 to 1994. She was a fellow at the Wilson Center from 1995 to 1996. She has served as director of the Middle East Program at the Wilson Center since 1997. She was also involved with the Wilson Center's collaboration with the RAND Corporation's Initiative for Middle Eastern Youth.

Esfandiari was a fellow at the National Endowment for Democracy in its first year of fellowship program in 1995. Esfandiari is a recipient of the MacArthur Foundation Grant. She is known to have been close to Faiza (Faezeh) Hashemi Rafsanjani, an Iranian politician and a daughter of Akbar Hashemi Rafsanjani, a former President of Iran. Since 2011, Esfandiari has been a member of the board of the Peace Research Endowment.

== Works ==
Esfandiari is the author of the book Reconstructed Lives: Women and Iran's Islamic Revolution (1997). In 2004, she co-wrote a paper for the Washington Institute for Near East Policy's Policy Watch Special Forum marking the twenty-fifth anniversary of the Islamic Revolution in Iran. In April 2005, she contributed a piece for Foreign Policy, titled "Iranian Woman Please Stand Up".

Esfandiari's book My Prison, My Home: One Woman's Story of Captivity in Iran was published in September 2009.

== Detention in Iran ==
On December 30, 2006, Esfandiari was robbed at knifepoint by three men while on the way to the airport after visiting her ailing 93-year-old mother in Tehran, Iran, whom she had visited approximately twice per year over the past decade. During this incident, the men threatened to kill her; then they stole her baggage and both her U.S. and Iranian passports. Consequently, she was not permitted to leave the country. When she applied for new travel documents, she was instead barred from leaving Iran and interrogated over a period of six weeks by authorities from the Iranian Ministry of Intelligence. These interrogations, which totaled approximately fifty hours, focused primarily on her work at the Wilson Center. During this time, she was allowed to return home each day, but "was pressured to make a false confession or to falsely implicate the Wilson Center in activities in which it had no part". On January 18, 2007, an interrogator and three other men (one holding a video camera) broke into her mother's apartment and entered Esfandiari's bedroom while she was taking an afternoon nap; they then took her laptop computer and other items.

In early May, she was asked again to confess to having taken part in anti-government activities, which she refused to do. On May 7, 2007, she was told to report to the Ministry of Intelligence. Upon her arrival there the next morning, she was taken into custody and driven to Tehran's Evin Prison. She was one of four dual U.S.-Iranian citizens to be detained by the Iranian government under similar circumstances in 2007, the others being Radio Farda correspondent Parnaz Azima, Ali Shakeri of the Center for Citizen Peacebuilding at the University of California, Irvine, and Kian Tajbakhsh, an Iranian American consultant for the Open Society Institute. A former FBI agent, Robert Levinson, has been missing in Iran since he disappeared in March 2007.

During her detention at Evin Prison, Esfandiari was allowed to make one- or two-minute telephone calls to her mother most evenings, but was not permitted to have contact with her other family members. On May 15, 2007, Iranian Judiciary spokesman Ali Reza Jamshidi confirmed that Esfandiari was being investigated for crimes against national security and that her case was being handled by the Intelligence Ministry. On May 21, 2007, Iran's state TV announced that the government of Iran had charged Esfandiari of seeking to topple that nation's ruling Islamic establishment. The Ministry of Intelligence said that Esfandiari had admitted during interrogation that her institute was funded by the Soros Foundation. On May 29, 2007, one day after a rare high-level meeting between Iranian and U.S. officials, Iran announced that its judiciary had brought charges of "endangering national security through propaganda against the system and espionage for foreigners" against Esfandiari.

=== Calls for release ===
Until the announcement of Esfandiari's detention, both Bakhash and the Wilson Center chose not to publicize her case, hoping that by keeping quiet, her travel documents would eventually be returned and she would be allowed to return to the U.S. In February 2007, the Center's president, the former U.S. Representative Lee H. Hamilton, sent letters to Iranian President Mahmoud Ahmadinejad and Iran's ambassador to the United Nations, Javad Zarif, in which he asked for assistance in obtaining Esfandiari's release. Ahmadinejad did not reply, but Zarif "indicated that he wanted to be helpful".

Following reports of her detention on May 9, 2007, both Bakhash and the Wilson Center gave statements to the press regarding the situation. Iran did not immediately confirm that Esfandiari is being detained. The U.S. State Department called for her release. On May 11, 2007, U.S. presidential candidates Hillary Clinton and Barack Obama and three congresspeople, (Senators) Barbara Mikulski, Benjamin L. Cardin, and Rep. Chris Van Hollen called for Esfandiari's release. At that time two campaigns demanding the release of Esfandiari with petitions were initiated by the American Islamic Congress and the Scholars for Peace in the Middle East.

On May 15, 2007, U.S. Senators Gordon H. Smith and Hillary Clinton introduced a resolution (S. RES. 199) calling for Esfandiari's immediate and unconditional release. U.S. Secretary of State Condoleezza Rice also called for Esfandiari's immediate release. On May 17, 2007, Iranian human rights activist and Nobel laureate Shirin Ebadi, who has known Esfandiari for many years, called for Esfandiari's immediate release and announced that she would be acting as one of Esfandiari's attorneys, along with Abdolfattah Soltani. The prosecutor of the Islamic Revolutionary Court, however, prevented Esfandiari from access to counsel, refused to provide detailed information regarding the charges against her, and refused on two occasions to allow her mother to visit her in prison. Two days later, it was announced that the Middle East Studies Association of North America had written to Ahmadinejad expressing concern over Iran's detention of Esfandiari and other scholars. Massachusetts Institute of Technology professor Noam Chomsky issued a statement deploring Esfandiari's detention and calling it "a gift" to U.S. officials considering a future attack on Iran. Juan Cole, a professor at the University of Michigan and past president of the Middle East Studies Association of North America, stated that he would boycott a conference in Iran which he had planned on attending in summer 2007, and called on other scholars to do the same.

On May 22, 2007, U.S. Representatives Chris Van Hollen, Tom Lantos, Elijah E. Cummings, Wayne T. Gilchrest, and Gary Ackerman introduced a resolution, H. RES. 430, which called for the Esfandiari's release. On July 16, 2007, footage of Esfandiari appeared for the first time on a program entitled In the Name of Democracy, aired on the Iranian state television channel IRIB. Esfandiari was shown wearing a scarf and speaking in Persian.

In approximately August 2007, Lee Hamilton sent an appeal on Esfandiari's behalf to Supreme Leader of Iran Ali Khamenei, mentioning her extensive efforts to explain Iran's history and culture. Hamilton received a rare, unsigned response from the ayatollah's office stating that he would deal with the issue and that "necessary measures will be taken as soon as possible".

=== Released on bail ===
On August 21, 2007, Esfandiari was released on a US$333,000 bail, after her mother handed over the deed to her Tehran apartment. Her passport was returned and she left Iran and flew to Austria on September 2.

== See also ==
- Ramin Jahanbegloo
- Ali Shakeri
- Kian Tajbakhsh
- US raid on Iranian liaison office in Arbil
- List of foreign nationals detained in Iran
