= International Boundaries Research Unit =

Research centre at Durham University

- Established: 1989
- Parent institution: Durham University
- Director: Philip E. Steinberg
- Location: Durham, United Kingdom
- Website: dur.ac.uk/ibru

The International Boundaries Research Unit (IBRU) is a research centre at Durham University in the United Kingdom. It provides practical expertise in boundary-making, border management and territorial dispute resolution.

== History ==
IBRU was established in 1989. Its function involves the study of boundaries and their impact on international relations and borderland development.

== Conferences ==
IBRU has organised international conferences to explore intellectual and practical questions relating to international boundaries and territorial dispute resolution. These international gatherings have included:

- The State of Sovereignty (Durham, 2009)
- Land and River Boundary Demarcation and Maintenance in Support of Borderland Development (Bangkok, 2006)
- Border Management in an Insecure World (Durham, 2006)
- Borders, Orders and Identities in the Muslim World (Durham, 2000)
- Permeable Boundaries and Borders in a Globalising World (Vancouver, 1999)
- Borderlands Under Stress (Durham, 1998)
- Boundaries and Energy: Problems and Prospects (Durham, 1996)
- International Boundaries and Environmental Security (Singapore, 1995)
- The Peaceful Management of Transboundary Resources (Durham, 1994)
- Boundary and Territorial Issues in the Mediterranean Basin (Malta, 1992)
- International Boundaries: Fresh Perspectives (Durham, 1991)
- International Boundaries and Boundary Conflict Resolution (Durham, 1989)

== Selected works ==
IBRU's published works encompass 51 works in 86 works in 114 publications in 2 languages and 1,325 library holdings.

- The Middle East and North Africa (1994)
- Territorial proposals for the settlement of the war in Bosnia-Hercegovina (1994) by Mladen Klemenčić
- The encyclopedia of international boundaries (1995)
- The territorial dispute between Indonesia and Malaysia over Pulau Sipadan and Pulau Ligitan in the Celebes Sea: a study in international law (1995) by R Haller-Trost
- Positioning and mapping international land boundaries (1995) by Ron K Adler
- How to prove title to territory : a brief, practical introduction to the law and evidence (1998) by John McHugo
- The international boundaries of East Timor (2001) by Neil Deeley
