= Sharifiyeh, Khuzestan =

Sharifiyeh شريفيه
- Village
- Location within Iran
- Coordinates: 31°02′23″N 48°58′34″E
- Country: Iran
- Province: Khuzestan
- County: Ahvaz
- Bakhsh: Central
- Rural District: Mosharrahat

Population (2006)
  - Total: 106
- Time zone: UTC+3:30 (IRST)
  - Summer (DST): UTC+4:30 (IRDT)

Sharifiyeh (Persian: شريفيه, also Romanized as Sharīfīyeh; also known as Hasbeh-i-Kochek, Sharafī, and Sharfiyeh) is a village in Mosharrahat Rural District, in the Central District of Ahvaz County, Khuzestan Province, Iran. At the 2006 census, its population was 106, in 15 families.
