= Kian Tajbakhsh =

Iranian-American academic

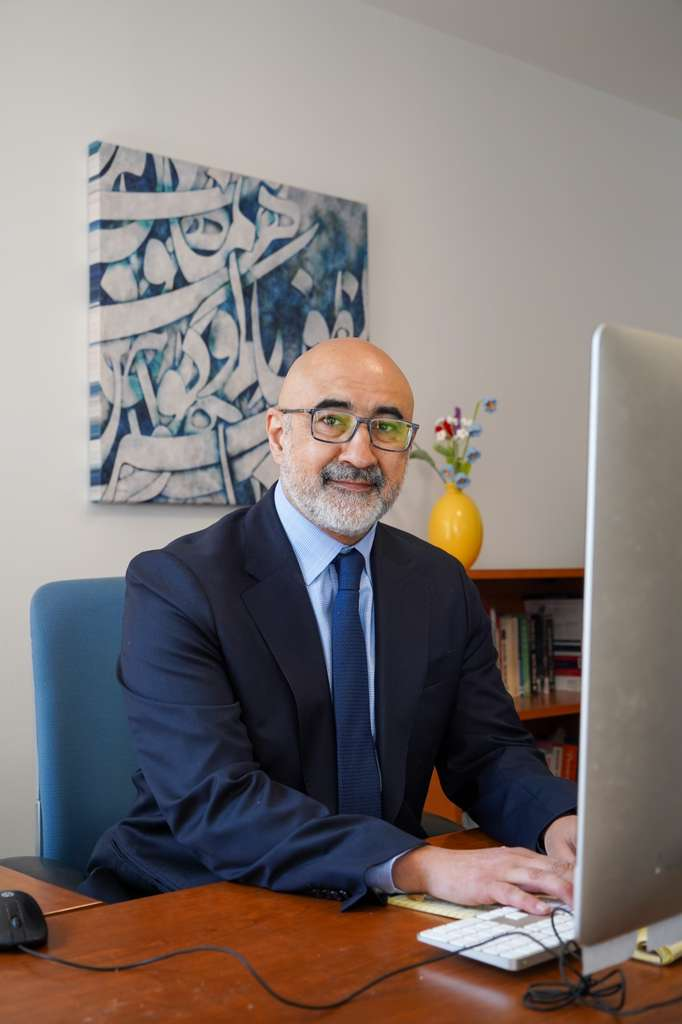
- Education: Columbia University; University College London
- Scientific career
- Fields: Social science Urban planning

Kian Tajbakhsh is an Iranian-American scholar, social scientist, and urban planner. He has taught at both American and Iranian universities. Tajbakhsh is an international expert in the areas of local government reform, urban planning, civil society capacity building, and international public policy research collaboration. He has also directed international projects in the areas of public health and social policy.

Tajbakhsh was one of the Iranian-American dual citizens who were arrested and detained for years in Iran for allegedly engaging in activities against national security. He was one of five Iranian-Americans, including Jason Rezaian, whose release was negotiated by the Obama administration as part of the Iran Nuclear Deal. He was finally permitted to leave on Implementation Day January 16, 2016.

== Academic career ==
Tajbakhsh's academic research spans on both theoretical and policy projects related to urbanism and city life. He has conducted empirical research on decentralization, the role of social capital in local government performance, and local economic development in a number of countries.

Tajbakhsh was set to begin a full-time academic teaching position at the Columbia Graduate School of Architecture, Planning and Preservation in New York City on September 8, 2009, but was unable to do so as a result of his incarceration. He took up his position at Columbia University as Visiting Professor of Urban Planning on February 1, 2016, which ended in 2018. Since 2016, as a Fellow of the Committee on Global Thought at Columbia, he has taught the class "Globalization and the Problems of World Order" in the Global Thought MA Program. In 2019, he became Senior Advisor to the Executive Vice President for Global Centers and Global Development at Columbia University working on university-wide initiatives focused on forced migration.

== Publications ==
Tajbakhsh is the author of two books, The Promise of the City: Space, Identity and Politics in Contemporary Social Thought (Berkeley and Los Angeles: University of California Press 2001), and Social Capital: Trust, Democracy and Development (Tehran: Shiraze Publishers 2005, in Persian). He co-edited the book City Diplomacy: The role of local governments in conflict prevention, peace-building, post-conflict reconstruction. Tajbakhsh has also published numerous scholarly articles, as well as essays on cinema and culture in Iran and India.

== International consulting ==
In 2006, he completed a three-year study of the local government sector in Iran with a focus on the reform of the inter-governmental system and its impact on urban policymaking. Between 2004 and 2007, Tajbakhsh coordinated the international project "A dialogue between local government in Iran and the Netherlands" which involved projects and dialogue between Iranian and Dutch Mayors and municipalities both in Iran and the Netherlands.

Tajbakhsh was an advisor to the Open Society Institute and the International Policy Fellowships program at OSI and the Central European University. He discontinued his work with OSI following his 2007 arrest.

== Arrests ==
Tajbakhsh was arrested at his home in Tehran on May 11, 2007, as the fourth Iranian-American, after Ali Shakeri, Haleh Esfandiari, and Nazi Azima, to be incarcerated, detained, or put under house arrest in 2007. He was accused of crimes against national security for working with American organizations such as the Open Society Institute and Gulf 2000 project, and held in solitary confinement in Evin Prison for more than four months.

In September 2007, Columbia University President Lee Bollinger demanded that Iranian President Mahmoud Ahmadinejad release Tajbakhsh in a widely publicized debate. Following a global campaign for his release involving high-level diplomatic efforts, he was allowed to leave Evin Prison on parole and be reunited with his wife in Tehran on September 19, 2007.

Tajbakhsh was arrested again in Tehran on July 9, 2009. He was among the thousands of people detained in the protests that followed the widely disputed presidential election of the incumbent, Mahmoud Ahmadinejad. The protest movement sparked Iran's greatest political and popular upheaval since the 1979 Iranian Revolution, compared in some reports to civil disobedience in colonial India before independence or in the American Deep South in the 1960s.

Tajbakhsh was one of many politicians, academics, journalists, and others forced to participate in a widely condemned mass trial. During much of this time he was held in an undisclosed location without access to a lawyer, family, or friends. The charges against him included his work for OSI, which the Iranian government had approved earlier.

On October 18, 2009, Tajbakhsh was convicted on two counts of espionage—"contacting foreign elements" and acting against national security—and sentenced to 15 years in prison. Public statements of support and demands for the charges to be dropped and for Tajbakhsh to be released were issued by universities, nongovernmental organizations, celebrities, politicians—from rock singer Sting to the European Union and U.S. Secretary of State Hillary Clinton. The White House called the charges baseless, stating that Tajbakhsh "has dedicated his life to fostering greater understanding between Iran and the international community. He embodies what is possible between our two countries."

In late November 2009, Tajbakhsh was threatened with new espionage charges carrying the death penalty, sparking further international concern and outrage. He had spent much of 2009 in solitary confinement until being transferred to a villa on the Evin Prison grounds, where he was detained together with prominent reformists who had also been tried in the mass show trial.

Tajbakhsh appealed his sentence and on February 7, 2010 the appellate court of the Islamic Revolutionary Court threw out the charges of espionage and convicted him instead to five years' imprisonment for acting against national security. After approximately eight months' incarceration (five months in solitary confinement), Tajbakhsh was provided "compassionate release" in March 2010 and permitted to serve out the remainder of his sentence on parole (furlough) with his family in Tehran.

Throughout this time (2010–2016), Tajbakhsh was not permitted to leave the country, work, publish, or teach.

Tajbakhsh's detention has been characterized, at least in part, as a hostage-taking by the Revolutionary Guards. He and his family finally received their passports and permission to leave Iran on January 16, 2016—Implementation Day for the US–Iran deal. On January 28, they left Iran for the United States.

On January 29, Tajbakhsh posted a message of thanks.

== Selected statements of support ==
- Sting
- The White House
- The European Union
- U.S. Secretary of State Hillary Clinton
- Columbia University President Lee Bollinger Columbia University Professor Ira Katznelson
- Columbia University GSAPP Dean Mark Wigley U.S. Department of State
- Amnesty International International Campaign for Human Rights in Iran American Sociological Association
- PEN American Center
- Middle East Studies Association of North America
- The New School for Social Research
- Human Rights Watch
- VNG-International Association of Netherlands Municipalities

== See also ==
- List of foreign nationals detained in Iran
