= Ali Shakeri =

Iranian-American businessman

Ali Shakeri (Persian: علی شاکری) is an Iranian-American businessman and activist. He graduated from the University of Texas with a business administration degree. He serves on the Community Advisory Board of the Center for Citizen Peacebuilding at the University of California, Irvine. Shakeri was one of four dual-nationality Iranian-Americans detained by the Iranian government in May 2007.

== Activism ==
Shakeri has also been a founding and active member of Ettehade Jomhourikhahan-e Iran (EJI), which advocates a democratic and secular republic in Iran.

== Imprisonment ==
In 2007 Shakeri went to Iran to visit his mother, who was ill and died during his visit. On May 8, 2007, while in Iran, he was detained by the Iranian government, one of four Americans detained in a short period. The others were Kian Tajbakhsh, Haleh Esfandiari and Parnaz Azima. On June 8, 2007, the Iranian Student News Agency confirmed the detention. He was released on September 25, 2007, and the other three were also released "in phases, from prison or allowed to leave the country ... in the run-up to President Ahmadinejad's" September 2007 speech before the United Nations. Shakeri called the American Iranian Council on October 2 to thank the AIC and its members for diplomatic actions taken to gain his release from prison in Iran.

== See also ==
- List of foreign nationals detained in Iran
